= NFL records =

National Football League records are the superlative statistics of the National Football League.

NFL records include:

- List of NFL individual records, a list of all-time records for individual NFL players
- List of NFL team records, a list of all-time records for teams and franchises
- List of NFL team playoff records, a list of records in the NFL playoffs
- List of Super Bowl records, a list of records set by teams and players in Super Bowl games
- List of NFL Pro Bowl records, a list of records set in the Pro Bowl

Records may also refer to longest NFL streaks:

- List of most consecutive games with touchdown passes in the NFL
- List of most consecutive starts and games played by NFL players
- List of most consecutive starts by an NFL quarterback
- List of NFL franchise post-season droughts
- List of NFL franchise post-season streaks

Records may also refer to lists of career-high statistics by individual players:

- List of NFL players by games played
- List of dual-threat quarterback records
- List of NFL career quarterback wins leaders
- List of NFL career passing yards leaders
- List of NFL career passing completions leaders
- List of NFL career passing touchdowns leaders
- List of NFL career interceptions thrown leaders
- List of NFL career passer rating leaders
- List of most sacked NFL quarterbacks
- List of NFL career rushing yards leaders
- List of NFL career rushing attempts leaders
- List of NFL career rushing touchdowns leaders
- List of NFL career receiving yards leaders
- List of NFL career receptions leaders
- List of NFL career receiving touchdowns leaders
- List of NFL career all-purpose yards leaders
- List of NFL career tackles leaders
- List of NFL career sacks leaders
- List of NFL career interceptions leaders
- List of NFL career punts leaders
- List of NFL career punting yards leaders
- List of most career field goals in NFL history
- List of longest NFL field goals
- List of most accurate kickers in NFL history
- List of NFL career kickoff return yards leaders
- List of NFL career scoring leaders
