= Hastings (disambiguation) =

Hastings is a town in the United Kingdom, most famous for the Battle of Hastings in 1066.

Hastings may also refer to:

== Places ==
=== Australia ===
- Hastings, Tasmania, a locality
- Hastings, Victoria, Australia
  - Electoral district of Hastings, Victoria, Australia
  - Hastings railway station, Melbourne
  - Shire of Hastings, a former local government area before the Victoria's 1994 amalgamations
- Hastings River
- Hastings (Neutral Bay), a heritage listed building

=== Canada ===
- Hastings (federal electoral district), in Ontario
- Hastings (Province of Canada electoral district)
- Hastings, Annapolis County, Nova Scotia
- Hastings, Cumberland County, Nova Scotia
- Hastings, Ontario, a village
- Hastings County, Ontario
- Hastings Park, a municipal park in Vancouver, British Columbia

=== New Zealand ===
- Hastings, New Zealand
- Hastings District, New Zealand
- Hastings (New Zealand electorate), a former parliamentary electorate, 1946–1996

=== United States ===
- Hastings, Florida, a town
- Hastings, Indiana, an unincorporated place
- Hastings, Iowa, a city
- Hastings, Michigan, a city
- Hastings Charter Township, Michigan
- Hastings, Minnesota, a city, county seat of Dakota County
- Hastings, Nebraska, a city, county seat of Adams County
- Hastings, New York, a town
- Hastings-on-Hudson, New York, a village
- Hastings, North Dakota a town
- Hastings, Oklahoma, a town
- Hastings, Pennsylvania, a borough
- Hastings, West Virginia, an unincorporated community

=== Elsewhere ===
- Hastings, Barbados, a village and beach resort
- Hastings Island, Mergui Archipelago, Burma
- Hastings, Loughborough, Leicestershire, England
- Hastings, Somerset, a location in England
- Borough of Hastings, a district of East Sussex, containing the town of Hastings, England
- Hastingues, in the Gascony region of France, spelled Hastings in the local Occitan language
- Hastings, Kolkata, a neighbourhood in Kolkata, India
- Hastings, Sierra Leone, a town

== People ==
- Hastings (name), a surname and given name (and list of people with the name)
- Baron Hastings
- Marquess of Hastings

== Schools ==
- University of California, Hastings College of the Law, San Francisco, California
- Hastings College, a private, Presbyterian college in Hastings, Nebraska
- Hastings College of Arts and Technology, now Sussex Coast College, Hastings, England
- Hastings School of Art, a former art school in Hastings, England
- Hastings Secondary College, Port Macquarie, New South Wales, Australia
- Hastings High School (disambiguation)
- Hastings Academy, a secondary school in Hastings, England
- Hastings Grammar School, a former name of Ark Alexandra Academy, Hastings, England

== Military ==
- Battle of Hastings, a 1066 battle won by William the Conqueror
- Operation Hastings, an American military operation in the Vietnam War
- Handley Page Hastings, a British troop-carrier and freight transport aircraft
- HMS Hastings (1819), an East Indiaman, later a Royal Navy ship of the line
- Hastings Naval Ammunition Depot, Nebraska, a World War II US Navy munitions plant

== Transport ==
- Hastings (East Indiaman), four ships that served the East India Company
- Hastings Street (disambiguation)
- Hastings (MBTA station), Weston, Massachusetts, US
- Hastings line, a secondary railway line in Kent and East Sussex, UK
- Hastings Bridge, spanning the Mississippi River in Hastings, Minnesota, US
- Hastings High Bridge, predecessor of Hastings Bridge

== Other uses ==
- Hastings (UK Parliament constituency)
- Hastings and Rye (UK Parliament constituency)
- Hastings (horse)
- Hastings Entertainment, a defunct retailer
- Hastings International Chess Congress, an annual chess tournament
- The Hastings Center for Bioethics, Garrison, New York, United States, a research institute and think tank

== See also ==
- Port Hastings, Nova Scotia, Canada
- Haustein, surname
