= Hastings station =

Hastings station or Hastings railway station may refer to:

- Hastings railway station, UK
- Hastings railway station, Melbourne, Hastings, Victoria, Australia
- Hastings railway station, New Zealand
- Hastings station (MBTA), Hastings, Massachusetts, United States
- Hastings station (Nebraska), Hastings, Nebraska, United States
- Hastings-on-Hudson station, Hastings-on-Hudson, New York, United States
- Hastings Bulverhythe, or Bulverhythe railway station, Hastings, England

== See also ==
- Hastings (disambiguation)
