= Hastings (East Indiaman) =

Four vessels with the name Hastings have served the East India Company (EIC), one on contract as an East Indiaman, one brig of the Bombay Pilot Service, one ship of the line, and one frigate of the Company's Bombay Marine.

- Hastings was the Indiaman Northington, that Simon Fraser purchased in 1780 when the EIC was done with it, and renamed. She was of 676 or 69356/94 tons (bm), 99 men, and 26 guns, when as Hastings she made one voyage for the EIC to St Helena and China between 1781 and 1783; she was present at the Battle of Porto Praya. In 1783 she was sold for breaking up.
- Hastings (1785 ship) was a brig of 170 tons (bm) that the Bombay Dockyard launched in 1787 for the Bengal Pilot Service. In 1818 the EIC sold her to local buyers. A fire in April 1823 destroyed her at Pulau Pasang, off Padang.
- HMS Hastings (1819) was a 74-gun third rate that the EIC launched in 1818, sailed to England, and sold to the Admiralty in 1819. The Royal Navy sold her in 1886.
- The frigate Hastings, of 566 tons (bm) was launched on 2 May 1821 by the Bombay Dockyard, but not commissioned until the eve of the first Anglo-Burmese war, in which she served. She was pierced for 32 guns but mounted 24. By 1838 she was at Bombay, serving as a receiving ship.

== See also ==
- Warren Hastings (East Indiaman)
