= Quarterback sack =

Action in gridiron football

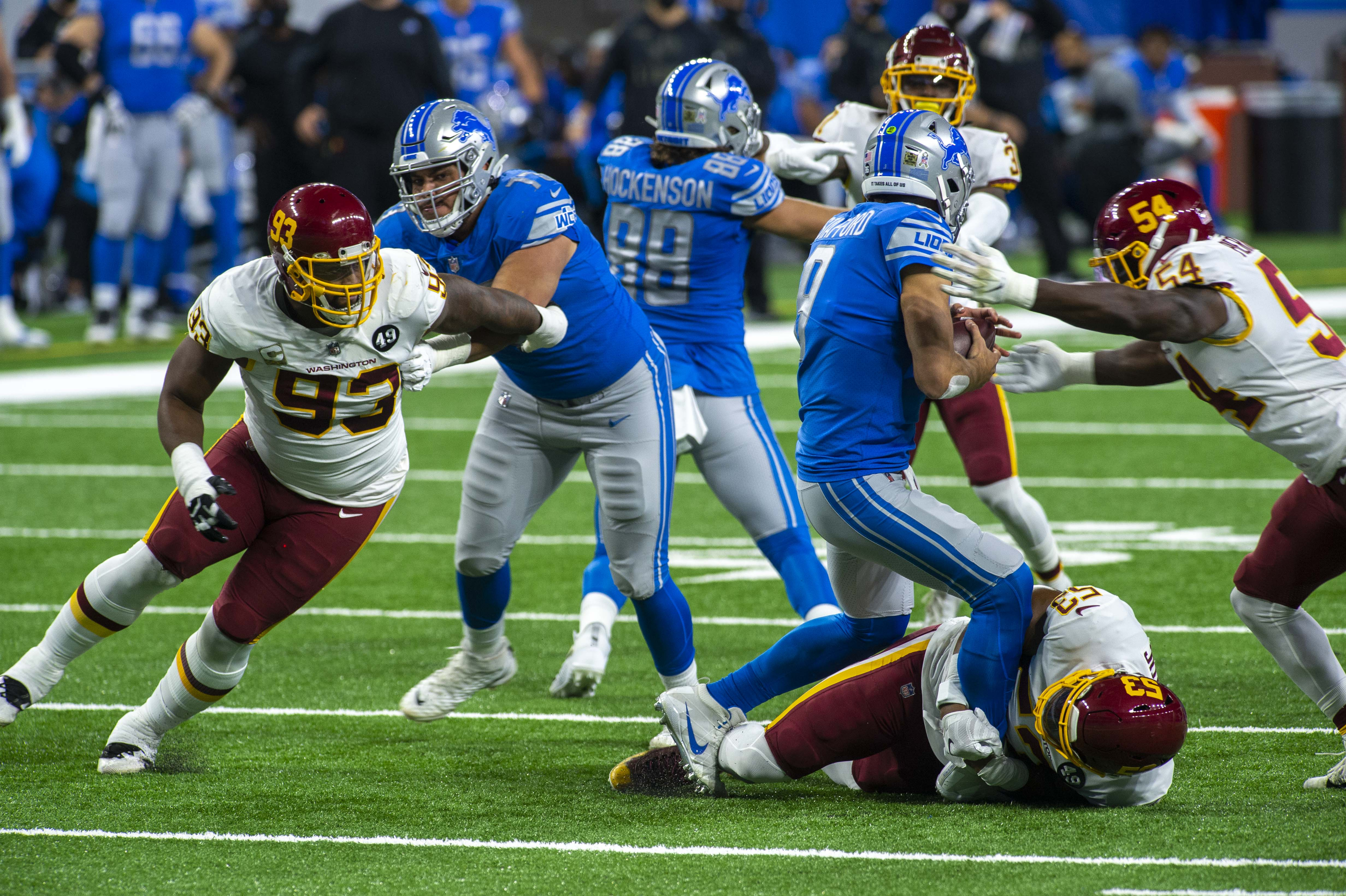
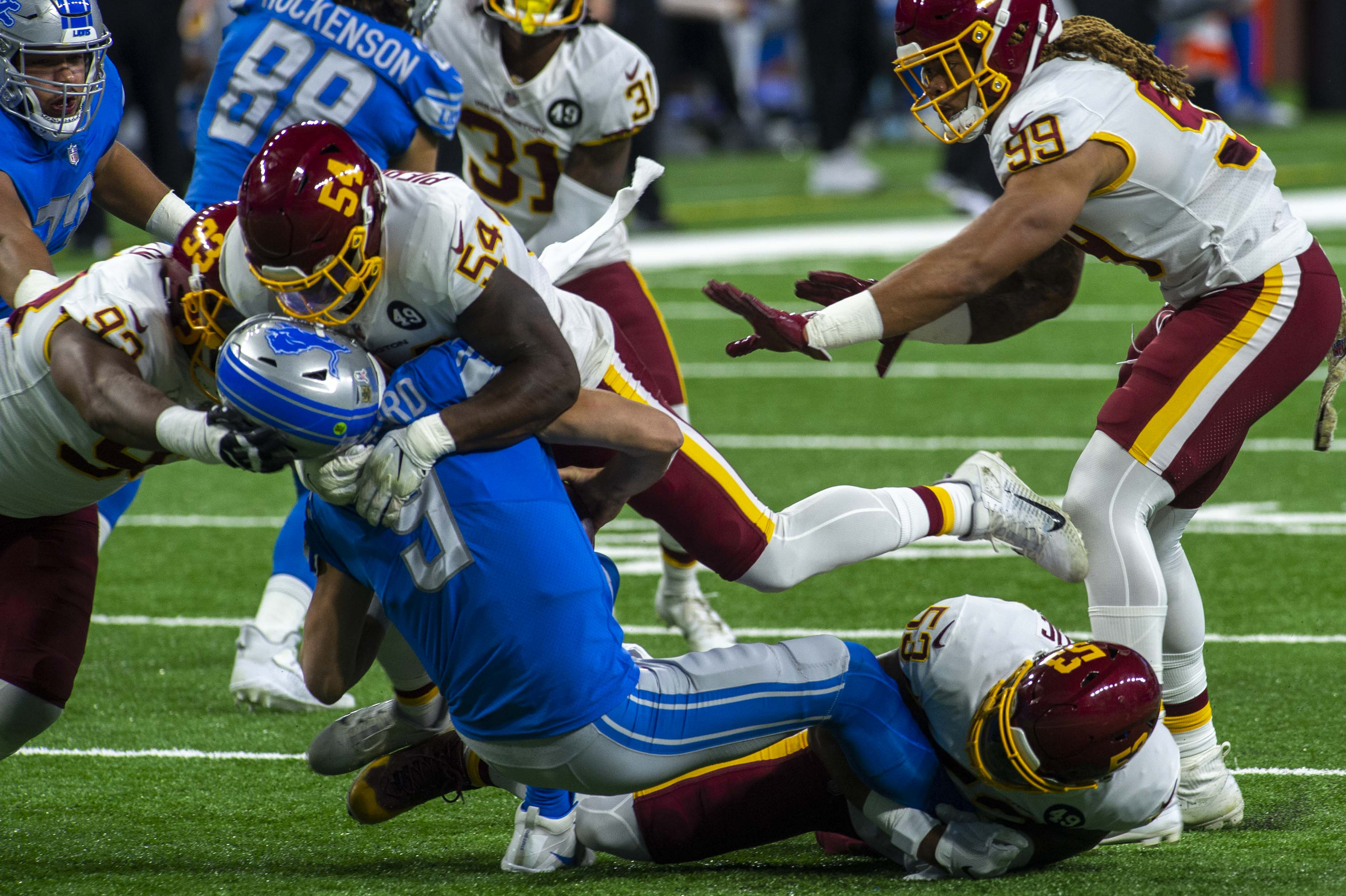
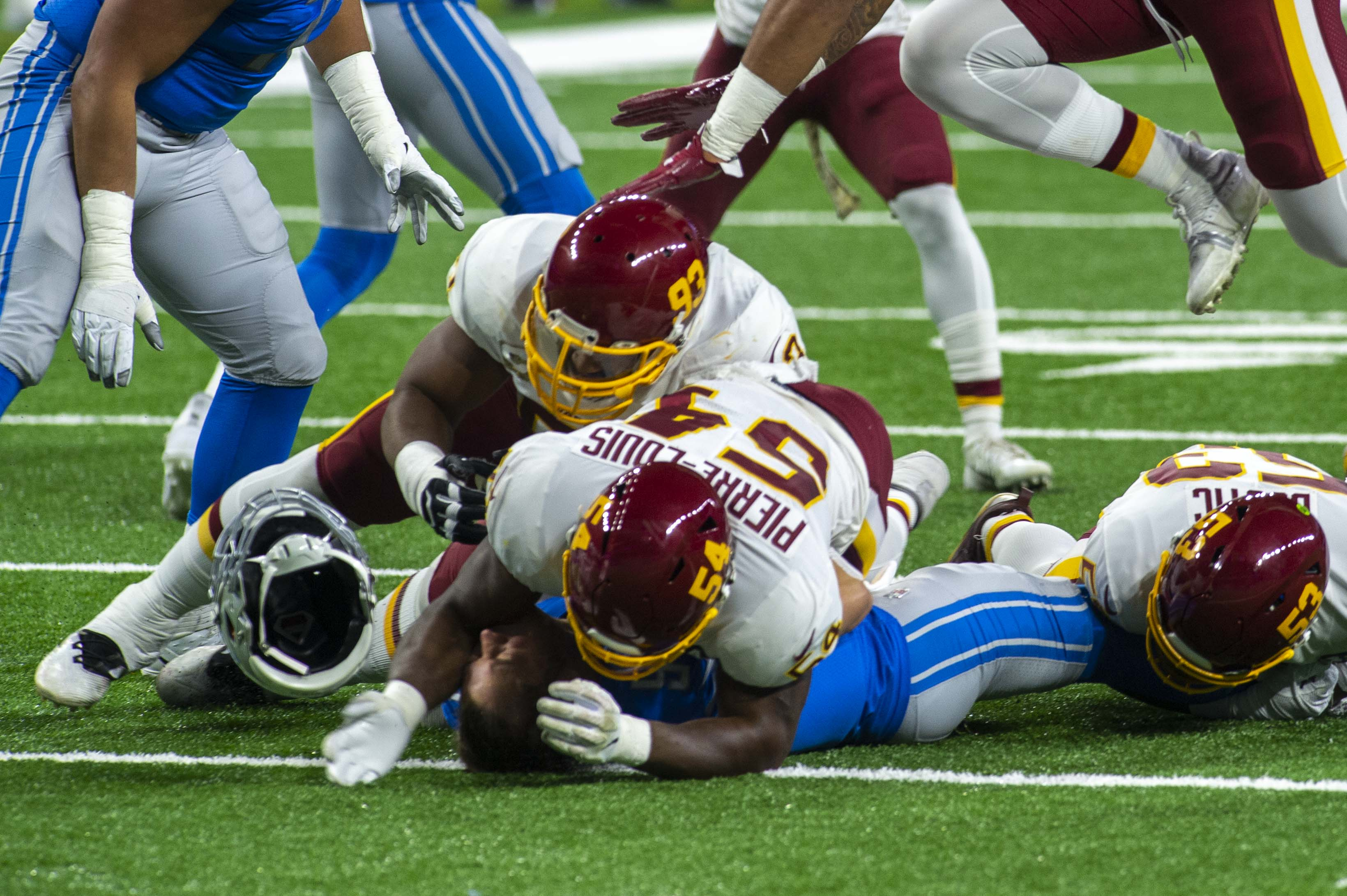
Quarterback Matthew Stafford being sacked by multiple Washington Football Team players.

In gridiron football, a sack occurs when the quarterback (or another offensive player acting as a passer) is tackled behind the line of scrimmage before throwing a forward pass, when the quarterback is tackled behind the line of scrimmage in the "pocket" and without clear intent, or when a passer runs out of bounds behind the line of scrimmage due to defensive pressure. This often occurs if the opposing team's defensive line, linebackers or defensive backs are able to apply pass pressure (also called a pass rush) to quickly get past blocking players of the offensive team (the quarterback's protection), or if the quarterback is unable to find an available eligible receiver (including wide receivers, running backs and tight ends) to catch the ball, allowing the defense a longer opportunity to tackle the quarterback.

A sack is advantageous for the defending team as the offense loses a down, and the line of scrimmage retreats several yards. Even better for the defense is a sack causing the quarterback to fumble the ball at or behind the line of scrimmage; this is also known as a strip sack and can result in a turnover if the defense manages to obtain the ball. A quarterback who is pressured but avoids a sack can still be adversely affected by being forced to hurry.

The quarterback must pass the statistical line of scrimmage to avoid the sack. If a passer is sacked in his own end zone, the result is a safety and the defending team is awarded two points. If the football is fumbled and recovered either inside the end zone by the defense, or outside the end zone and is returned to the end zone this results in a touchdown for the defense.

== Statistical record rules ==
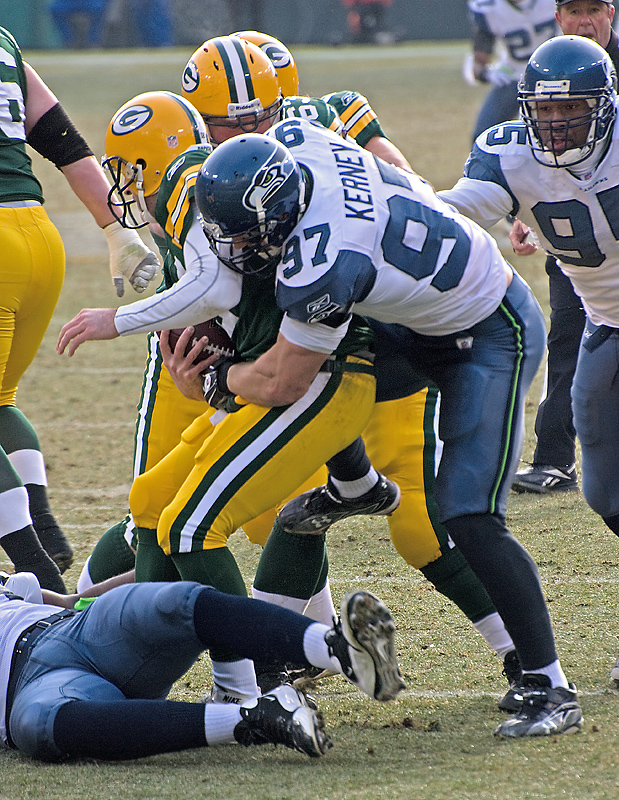
Green Bay quarterback Aaron Rodgers being sacked by Seattle defensive end Patrick Kerney in 2009.

To be considered a sack, the quarterback must intend to throw a forward pass. If the play is designed for the quarterback to rush (run) the ball, any loss is subtracted from the quarterback's rushing total (and the play is ruled a tackle for loss as opposed to a sack). If the quarterback's intent is not obvious, statisticians use certain criteria, such as the offensive line blocking scheme, to decide. Unique situations where a loss reduces a quarterback's rushing total (not a sack) are "kneel downs" (used to run time off the game clock).

A player will receive credit for half of a sack when multiple players contribute to the sacking of a quarterback, even if more than two players contributed.

In the National Football League (NFL), it is possible to record a sack for zero yards. The NFL subtracts yards lost due to sacks from teams' passing totals (though the quarterback's individual passing total stats remain unchanged), while the NCAA subtracts sack yardage from individual rushing totals.

== History ==
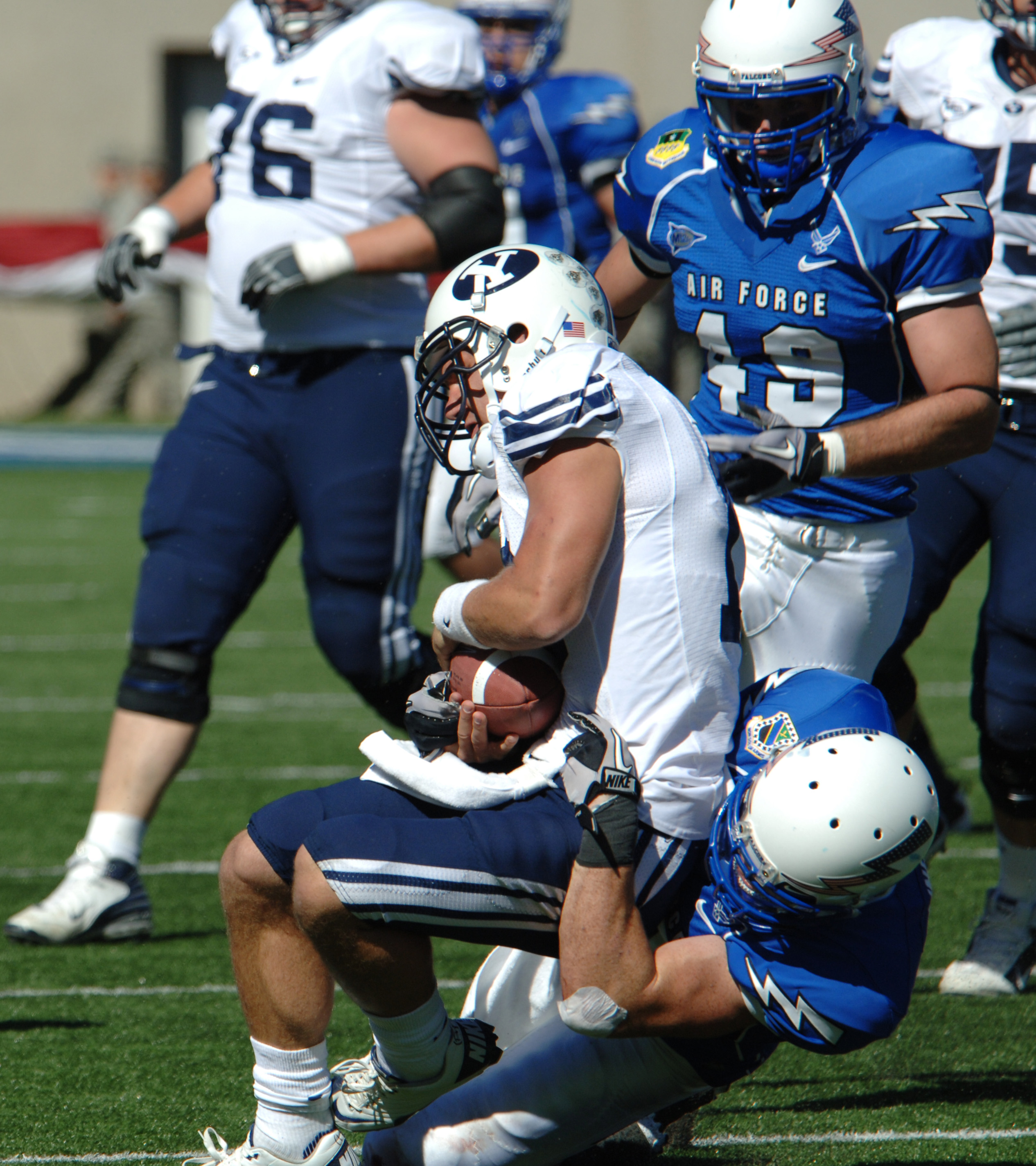
BYU quarterback Riley Nelson being sacked by Air Force.

The term sack was first popularized in the 1960s by Hall of Fame defensive end Deacon Jones, who felt that a quarterback being sacked devastated the offense in the same way that a city was devastated when it was sacked. In 1999, Jones provided a Los Angeles Times reporter with some other detailed imagery about his forte: "You take all the offensive linemen and put them in a burlap bag, and then you take a baseball bat and beat on the bag. You're sacking them, you're bagging them. And that's what you're doing with a quarterback."

According to former NFL coach Marv Levy, Washington Redskins coach George Allen may have coined the term when referring to Dallas Cowboys quarterback Craig Morton when he purportedly stated before a game, "Before we play those Dallas Cowboys, we're going to take that Morton salt and pour him into a sack."

Prior to sack, the term dump was often used, as the NFL's statistical office recorded all sacks under "dumping the passer".

The NFL only began to keep track of times passers lost yardage in 1961 and no credit was given to the defensive player responsible until 1982. Researcher John Turney of the Pro Football Researchers Association estimated that Jones recorded 173½ sacks in his career.

Controversial NFL rule changes made for the 2018 season prohibit tacklers from landing on the quarterback after making a sack, with the punishment being a roughing the passer penalty.

== Pass pressure ==
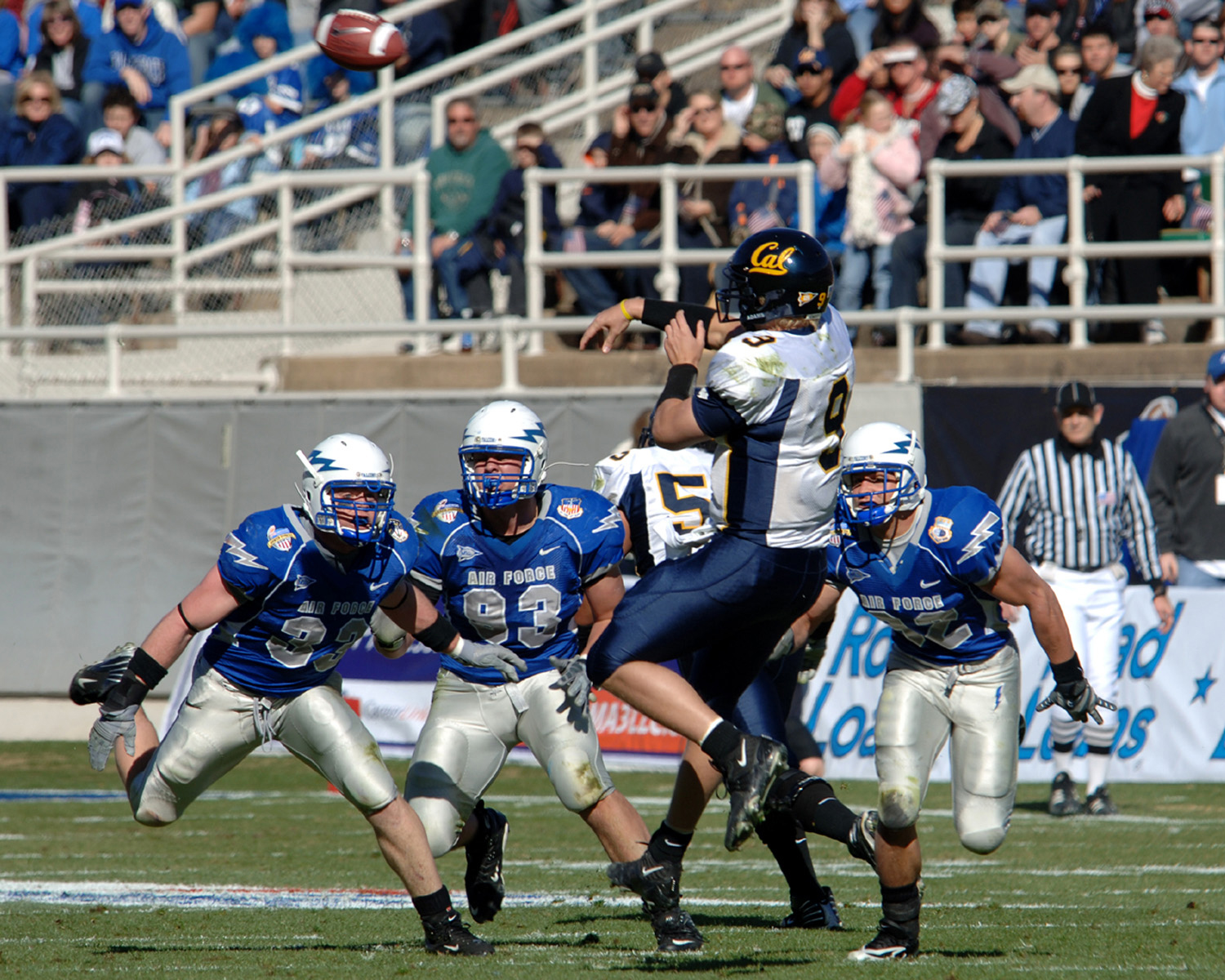
A quarterback under pressure.

Of all forms of defensive pressure against the opposition's passer, sacks provide the most immediate impact by ending the offensive play. However, quarterbacks sometimes avoid a sack by throwing an incomplete pass or risking an interception. According to Football Outsiders, a quarterback hurry is the most common form of pass pressure. In the 2009 NFL season, there were 1,106 sacks and 3,268 hurries, and a hurried quarterback generally averaged fewer yards per pass play compared to the average pass play.

== NFL records ==
These records are from 1982 onwards, the year the NFL started officially recording sacks.

- NFL single-season sacks: 23, Myles Garrett, 2025
- NFL career sacks: 200, Bruce Smith, 1985–2003
- NFL single-game sacks: 7, Derrick Thomas, November 11, 1990 vs. Seattle Seahawks (Note: Norm Willey made 17 sacks during one game according to 1952 newspaper accounts. However, sacks weren't an official statistic at the time.)
- NFL sacks, rookie season: 14.5, Jevon Kearse, 1999
- NFL seasons leading league in sacks: 3, T. J. Watt, 2020, 2021, 2023
- NFL seasons with 20.0 or more sacks: 2, J. J. Watt, 2012 & 2014
- NFL most consecutive games recording a sack: 11, Chris Jones, 2018
- NFL most consecutive games recording a sack (team): 75, Pittsburgh Steelers, 2016–2021
- NFL career sacks taken: 623, Aaron Rodgers, 2005–present
- NFL single-season sacks taken: 76, David Carr, 2002
- NFL game sacks taken: 12, Warren Moon, September 29, 1985, and Donovan McNabb, September 30, 2007
- NFL Super Bowl most sacks in a single game: 12, Carolina vs. Denver, 50 (7 by Denver, 5 by Carolina)
- NFL Super Bowl most sacks by a player in a single game: 3 (Note: L. C. Greenwood had 4 sacks in Super Bowl X. However, sacks were not officially recorded by the NFL at that point.)

- Reggie White – Green Bay vs. New England, XXXI
- Darnell Dockett – Arizona vs. Pittsburgh, XLIII
- Kony Ealy – Carolina vs. Denver, 50
- Grady Jarrett – Atlanta vs. New England, LI

- NFL Super Bowl most sacks, career (sacks compiled since XVII)

- 4.5, Charles Haley – 5 games San Francisco XXIII, XXIV, Dallas XXVII, XXVIII, XXX
- 4.5, Von Miller – 2 games Denver 50 and Los Angeles Rams LVI

== See also ==
- The Blind Side: Evolution of a Game – non-fiction book by Michael Lewis
