= List of most consecutive games with touchdown passes in the NFL =

Following is the list of players to achieve the longest consecutive streaks of throwing touchdown passes in consecutive games in the National Football League.

Updated through 2021 season

== Regular season ==
=== Official ===
An official streak is defined as a player passing for touchdown passes in consecutive games in which the player participated in a game. By this definition, a player's streak extends if the QB does not participate in any aspect of a given game due to injury or other reason. This definition is officially used by the NFL to track consecutive games with touchdown passes.

==== All-time consecutive games with at least one touchdown pass ====
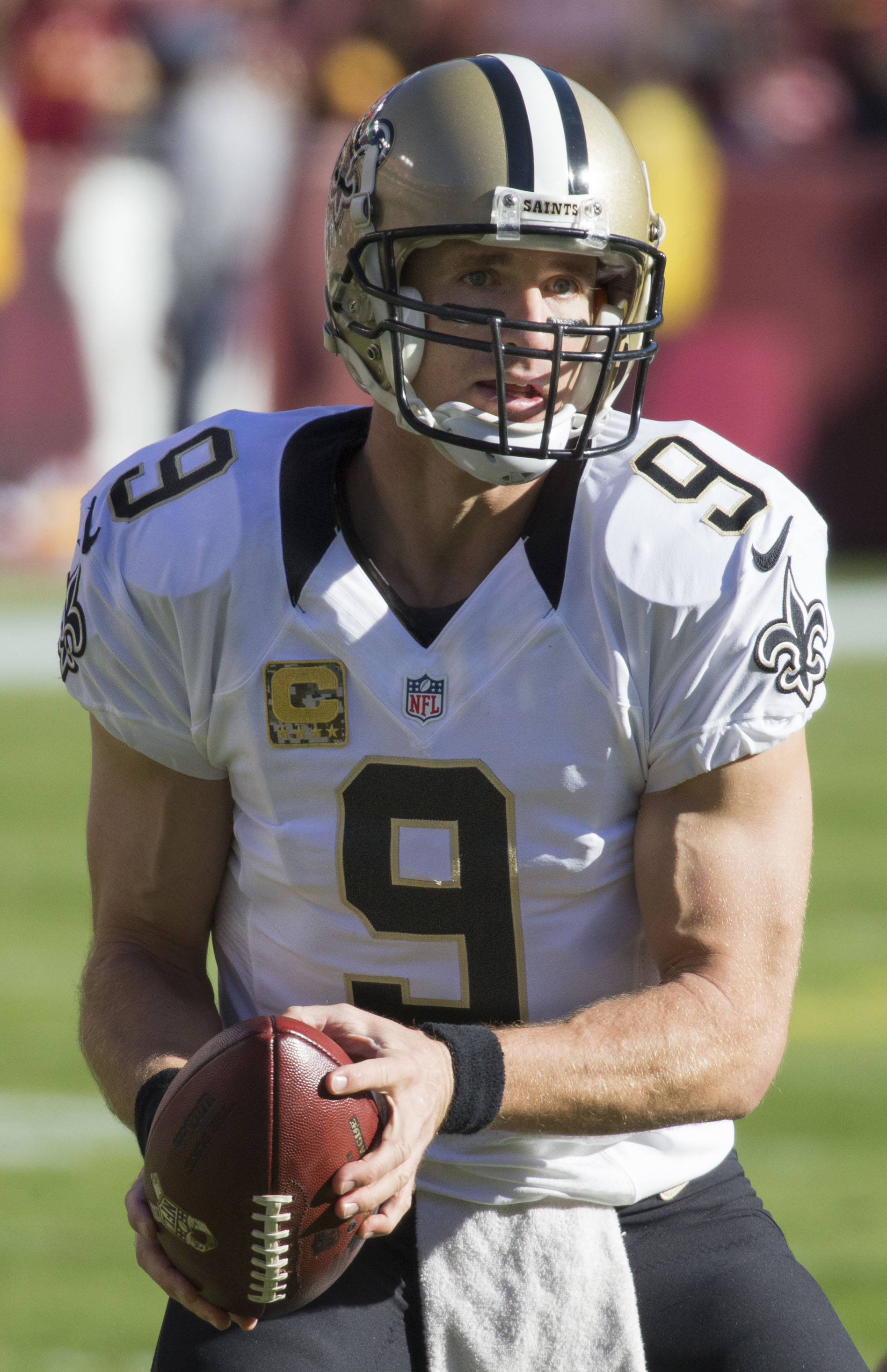
Drew Brees holds the record for consecutive regular season games with a touchdown pass with 54.

Drew Brees holds the NFL record, 54 games, for consecutive games with at least one touchdown pass. He set the record on October 7, 2012, when he surpassed the streak of 47 consecutive games by Johnny Unitas which had stood since December 11, 1960. Unitas had held the record for nearly 52 years after surpassing Cecil Isbell's streak of 23, which had been established as the record in 1942. Brees's record streak ended on November 29, 2012, against the Atlanta Falcons.

Bold denotes an active streak; minimum 23 consecutive regular season games.

Rank	Quarterback	Period	Team	Consecutive games	Reference
1	Drew Brees	October 18, 2009 – November 29, 2012	New Orleans Saints	54	
2	Tom Brady	September 12, 2010 – September 29, 2013	New England Patriots	52	
3	Peyton Manning	November 21, 2010 – November 30, 2014	Indianapolis Colts/ Denver Broncos	51	
4	Johnny Unitas	December 9, 1956 – December 4, 1960	Baltimore Colts	47	
5	Drew Brees	December 9, 2012 – November 15, 2015	New Orleans Saints	45	
6	Kirk Cousins	September 27, 2020 – November 20, 2022	Minnesota Vikings	39	
7	Tony Romo	October 1, 2012 – November 23, 2014	Dallas Cowboys	38	
8	Brett Favre	November 4, 2002 – November 29, 2004	Green Bay Packers	36	
9	Andrew Luck	December 28, 2014 – November 25, 2018	Indianapolis Colts	34	
10	Patrick Mahomes	October 6, 2019 – October 17, 2021	Kansas City Chiefs	31	
11T	Dan Marino	October 11, 1985 – November 22, 1987	Miami Dolphins	30	
11T	Ben Roethlisberger	September 9, 2012 – September 7, 2014	Pittsburgh Steelers	30	
11T	Matt Ryan	December 20, 2015 – November 26, 2017	Atlanta Falcons	30	
**14**	**Jared Goff**	**November 28, 2024 - November 8, 2026**	**Detroit Lions**	**30**	
15T	Dave Krieg	December 11, 1983 – November 10, 1985	Seattle Seahawks	28	
15T	Philip Rivers	December 9, 2012 – October 23, 2014	San Diego Chargers	28	
17T	Chris Chandler	September 14, 1997 – September 12, 1999	Atlanta Falcons	27	
17T	Peyton Manning	September 27, 1998 – December 19, 1999	Indianapolis Colts	27	
17T	Philip Rivers	October 1, 2017 – December 13, 2018	Los Angeles Chargers	27	
17T	Ben Roethlisberger	September 14, 2020 – December 9, 2021	Pittsburgh Steelers	27	
21	Ben Roethlisberger	October 15, 2017 – December 30, 2018	Pittsburgh Steelers	26	
22T	Daryle Lamonica	December 8, 1968 – November 15, 1970	Oakland Raiders	25	
22T	Justin Herbert	December 13, 2020 – October 17, 2022	Los Angeles Chargers	25	
24T	Frank Ryan	December 5, 1965 – November 5, 1967	Cleveland Browns	25	
24T	Daunte Culpepper	September 10, 2000 – November 19, 2001	Minnesota Vikings	25	
24T	Tom Brady	October 27, 2013 – December 28, 2014	New England Patriots	25	
27T	Cecil Isbell	November 24, 1940 – December 6, 1942	Green Bay Packers	23	
27T	Sonny Jurgensen	November 27, 1966 – October 20, 1968	Washington Redskins	23	
27T	Kurt Warner	September 12, 1999 – October 22, 2000	St. Louis Rams	23	
27T	Brian Griese	September 10, 2001 – October 27, 2002	Denver Broncos	23	
27T	Steve McNair	October 14, 2001 – November 17, 2002	Tennessee Titans	23	
27T	Philip Rivers	October 4, 2009 – November 22, 2010	San Diego Chargers	23	

==== All-time consecutive games with at least two touchdown passes ====
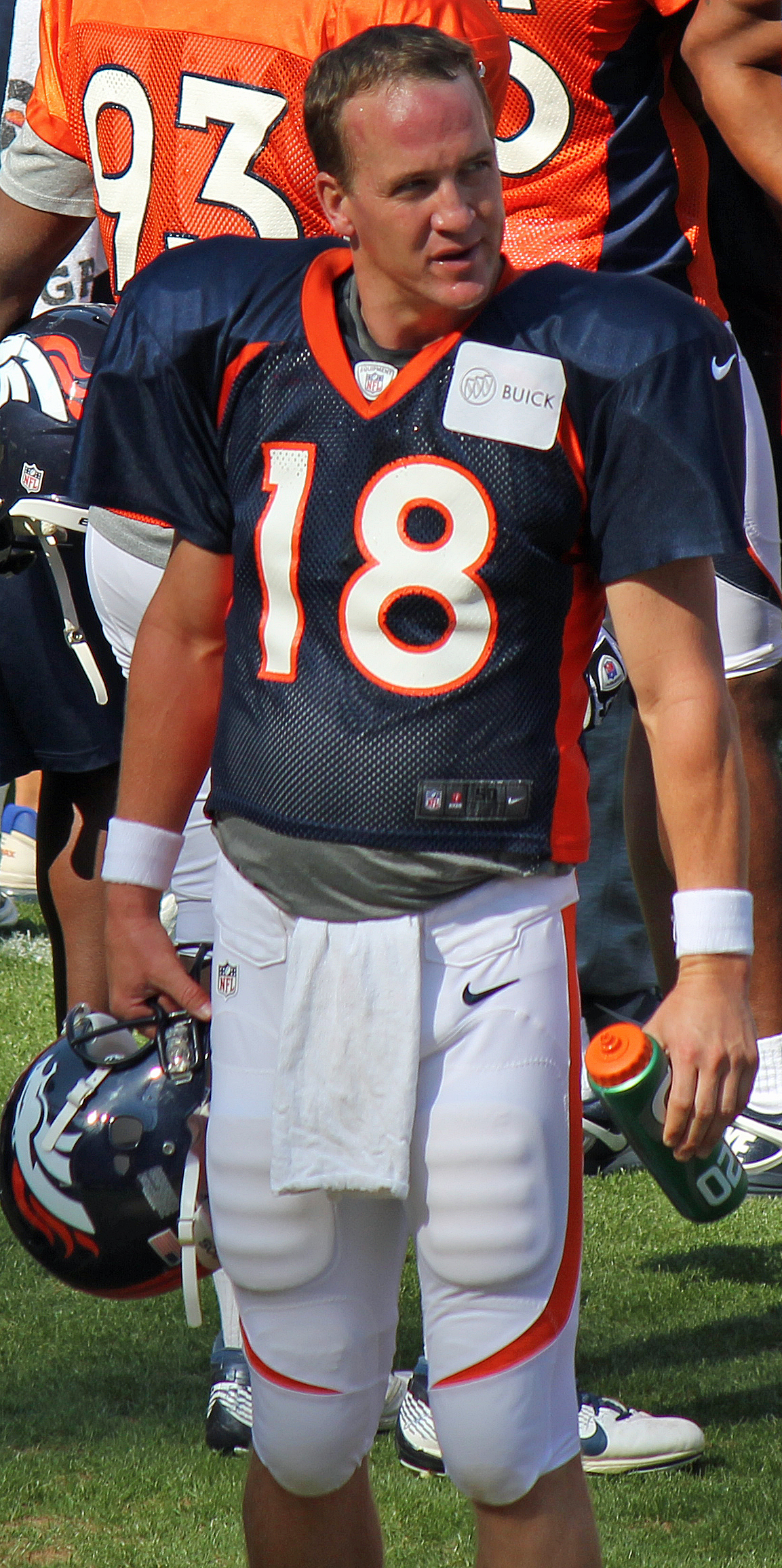
Peyton Manning completed 2+ touchdown passes over fifteen consecutive games, an NFL record.

Peyton Manning set the record for consecutive games with at least two touchdown passes with 15 in 2013, surpassing the record shared by several players including a streak of 13 he had in 2004. The previous record had since been tied by Tom Brady in 2007 and Aaron Rodgers in 2011. The record of 12 before that was set by Johnny Unitas in 1959 and tied by others before being surpassed by Manning. Don Meredith also had 13 consecutive games with at least two touchdown passes from 1965 through 1966. However, Meredith's streak was interrupted by not playing in the October 24, 1965, contest between the Dallas Cowboys and Green Bay Packers.

Bold denotes an active streak; minimum 10 consecutive regular season games.

Rank	Quarterback	Period	Team	Consecutive games	Reference
1	Peyton Manning	November 24, 2013 – September 11, 2014	Denver Broncos	15	
2	Patrick Mahomes	October 14, 2018 – September 22, 2019	Kansas City Chiefs	14	
3T	Don Meredith	October 17, 1965 – September 10, 1966	Dallas Cowboys	13	
3T	Peyton Manning	September 9, 2004 – December 12, 2004	Indianapolis Colts	13	
3T	Tom Brady	July 11, 2010 – February 10, 2011	New England Patriots	13	
3T	Aaron Rodgers	August 9, 2011 – November 12, 2011	Green Bay Packers	13	
3T	Philip Rivers	December 31, 2017 – February 12, 2018	Los Angeles Chargers	13	
7T	Johnny Unitas	September 27, 1959 – December 12, 1959	Baltimore Colts	12	
7T	Dan Marino	February 11, 1986 – January 11, 1987	Miami Dolphins	12	
7T	Brett Favre	June 11, 1994 – September 24, 1995	Green Bay Packers	12	
10T	Peyton Manning	December 23, 2012 – October 11, 2013	Denver Broncos	11	
10T	Cam Newton	September 16, 2018 – February 12, 2018	Carolina Panthers	11	
13T	Dan Marino	February 9, 1984 – April 11, 1984	Miami Dolphins	10	
13T	Tom Brady	September 9, 2007 – November 18, 2007	New England Patriots	10	
13T	Tom Brady	May 10, 2014 – December 14, 2014	New England Patriots	10	
13T	Philip Rivers	October 30, 2016 – November 9, 2017	San Diego/Los Angeles Chargers	10	

==== All-time consecutive games with at least three touchdown passes ====
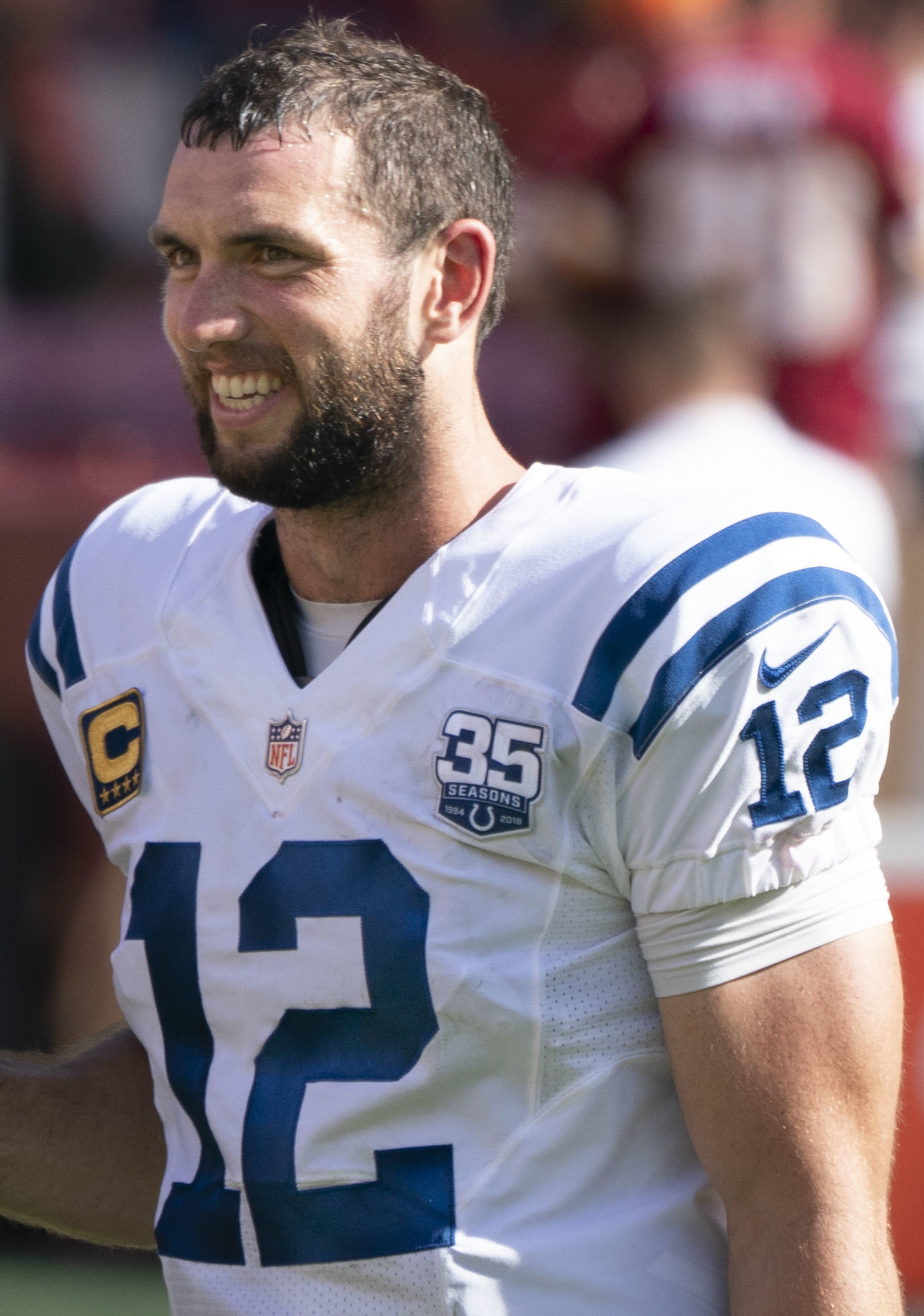
Andrew Luck is a quarterback to have had at least five consecutive games with 3+ touchdown passes.

Tom Brady set the record for consecutive games with at least three touchdown passes with 10 in 2007. The previous record of 8 was set by Peyton Manning in 2004 who had surpassed Marino's record of 7 established in 1987.

Bold denotes an active streak; minimum 5 consecutive regular season games.

Rank	Quarterback	Period	Team	Consecutive games	Reference
1	Tom Brady	September 9, 2007 – November 18, 2007	New England Patriots	10	
2T	Peyton Manning	October 10, 2004 – December 5, 2004	Indianapolis Colts	8	
2T	Andrew Luck	September 30, 2018 – November 25, 2018	Indianapolis Colts	8	
2T	Joe Burrow	November 3, 2024 – December 28, 2024	Cincinnati Bengals	8	
4	Dan Marino	December 7, 1986 – November 1, 1987	Miami Dolphins	7	

==== All-time consecutive games with at least four touchdown passes ====
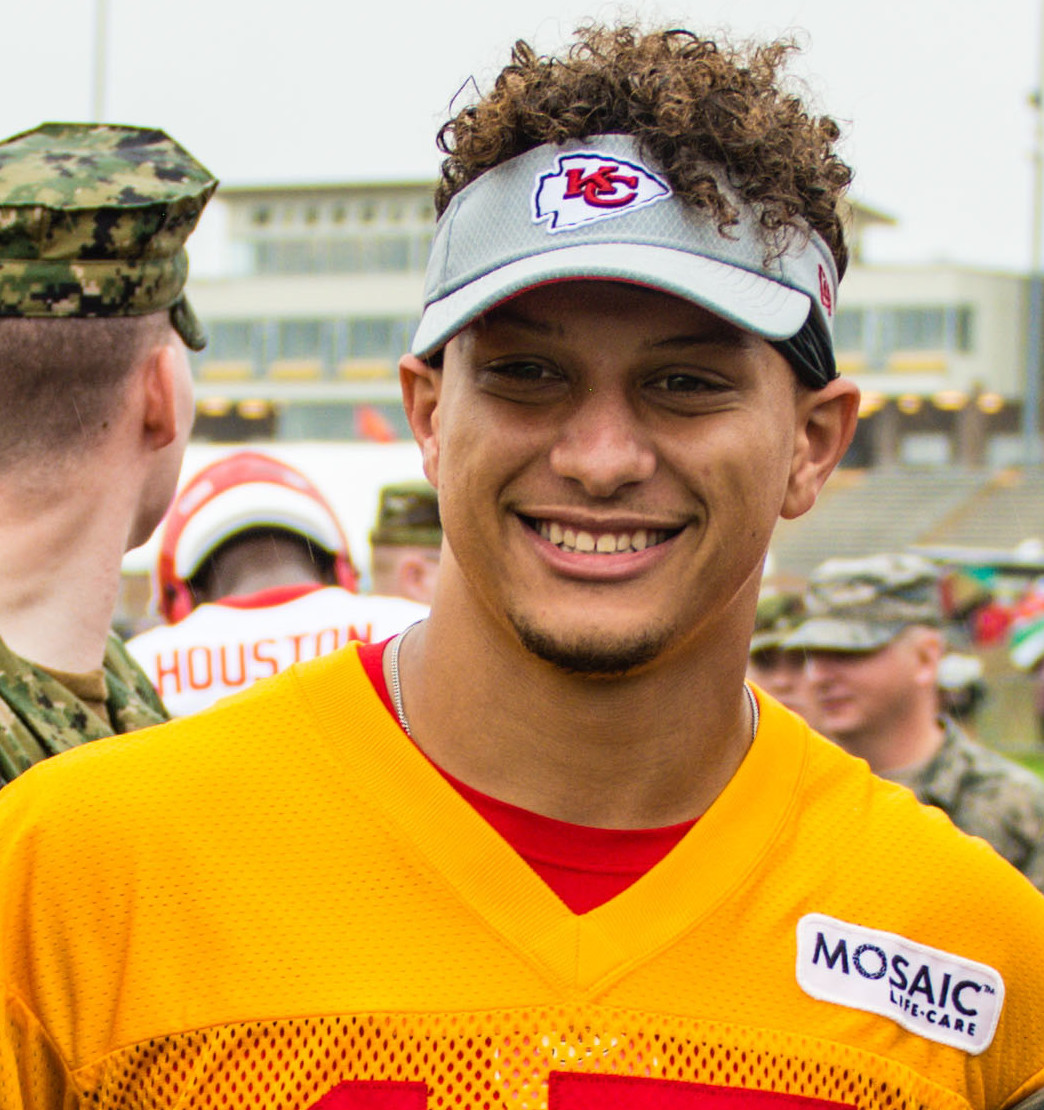
Patrick Mahomes is a recent player to throw 4+ touchdown passes in at least three consecutive games.

Peyton Manning set the record for consecutive games with at least four touchdown passes with 5 in 2004. The previous record of 4 was set by Dan Marino in 1984.

Bold denotes an active streak; minimum 3 consecutive regular season games.

Rank	Quarterback	Period	Team	Consecutive games	Reference
1	Peyton Manning	October 31, 2004 – November 25, 2004	Indianapolis Colts	5	
2T	Dan Marino	November 26, 1984 – December 17, 1984	Miami Dolphins	4	
2T	Tom Brady	December 26, 2020 – September 19, 2021	Tampa Bay Buccaneers	4	
3T	Drew Brees	December 18, 2011 – January 1, 2012	New Orleans Saints	3	
3T	Patrick Mahomes	October 14, 2018 – October 28, 2018	Kansas City Chiefs	3	
3T	Russell Wilson	September 13, 2020 – September 27, 2020	Seattle Seahawks	3	
3T	Joe Burrow	October 11, 2026 – November 1, 2026	Cincinnati Bengals	3	

==== All-time consecutive games with at least five touchdown passes ====
Daunte Culpepper was the first player in NFL history to have consecutive games with five touchdown passes. Tom Flores of the American Football League (which later merged with the NFL) also had consecutive games with at least five touchdown passes in 1963.

Bold denotes an active streak; minimum 2 consecutive regular season games.

Rank	Quarterback	Period	Team	Consecutive games	Reference
1T	Daunte Culpepper	October 10, 2004 – October 17, 2004	Minnesota Vikings	2	
1T	Tom Brady	October 14, 2007 – October 21, 2007	New England Patriots	2	
1T	Ben Roethlisberger	October 26, 2014 – November 2, 2014	Pittsburgh Steelers	2	
1T	Russell Wilson	September 20, 2020 – September 27, 2020	Seattle Seahawks	2	

==== All-time consecutive games with at least six touchdown passes ====
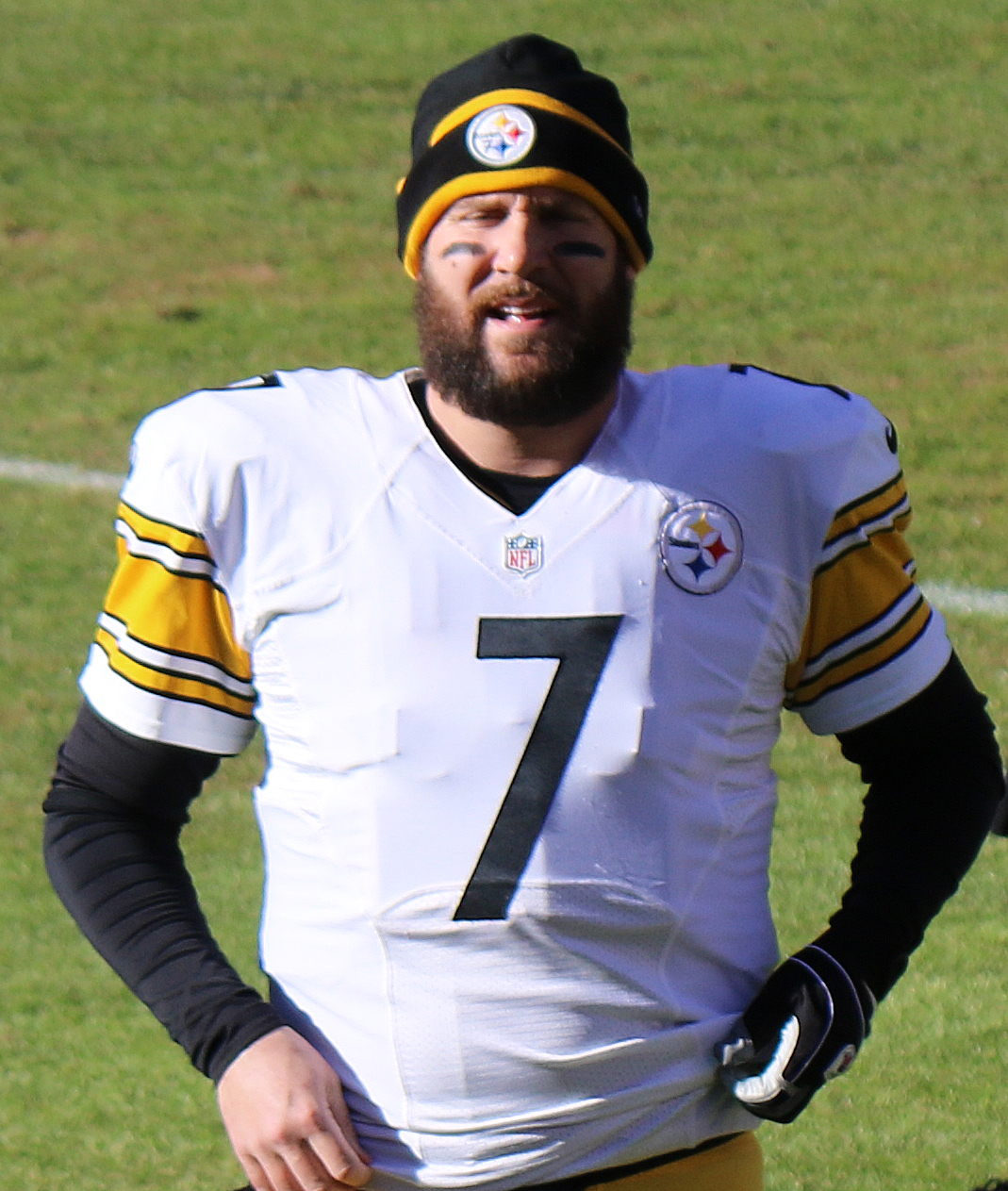
Ben Roethlisberger is the only quarterback in NFL history to record back to back 6 touchdown pass performances.

Ben Roethlisberger established the record with at least six touchdown passes in two consecutive games in 2014.

Bold denotes an active streak; minimum 2 consecutive regular season games.

Rank	Quarterback	Period	Team	Consecutive games	Reference
1	Ben Roethlisberger	October 26, 2014 – November 2, 2014	Pittsburgh Steelers	2	

=== Uninterrupted ===
An uninterrupted streak is defined as a player passing for touchdown passes in consecutive games uninterrupted for any reason including injury or other reason. By this definition, a player streak ends if the player does not participate in any aspect of a given game due to injury or other reason. This definition is not officially used by the NFL to track consecutive games with touchdown passes.

==== All-time consecutive uninterrupted games with at least one touchdown pass ====
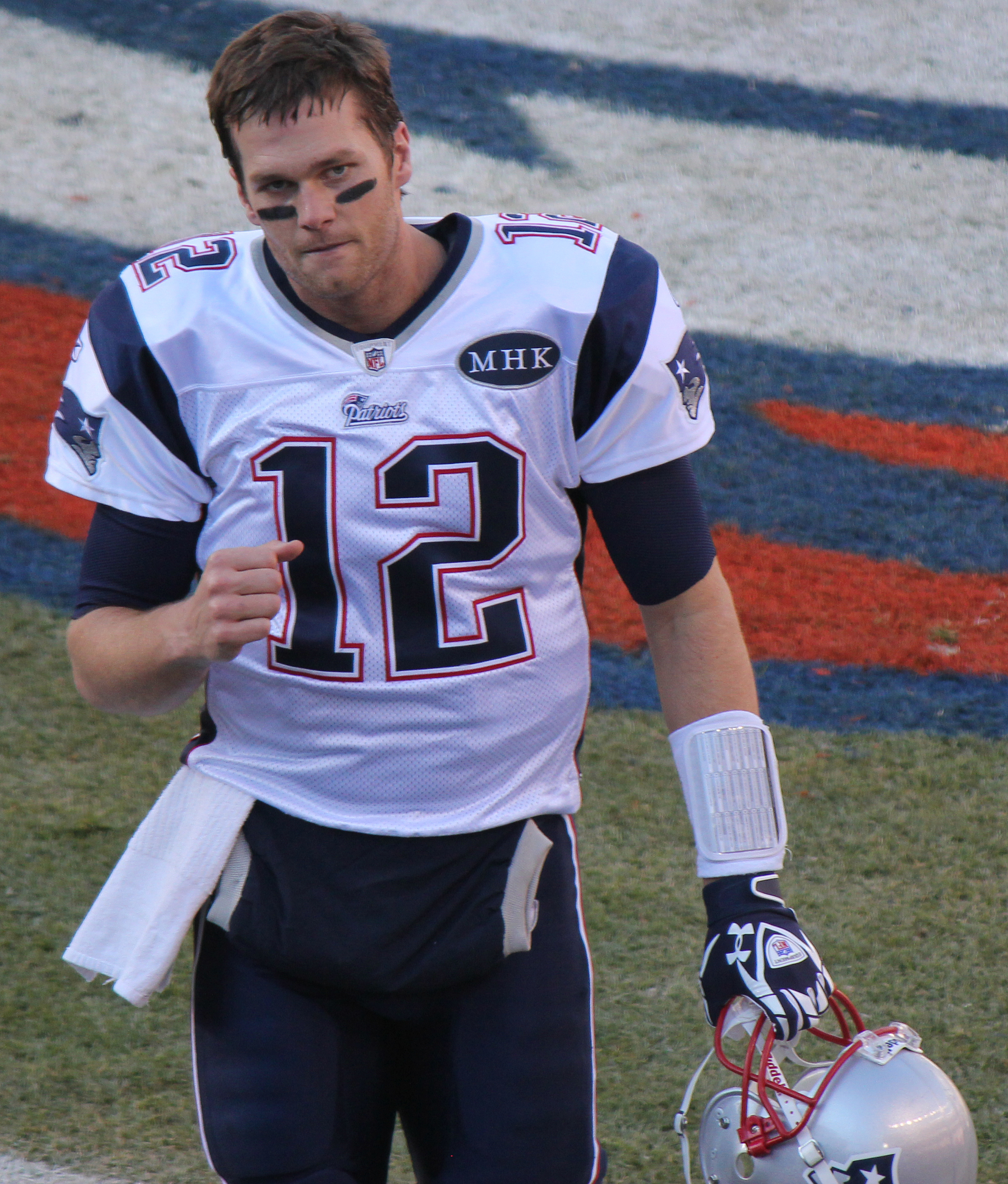
Tom Brady holds the record for consecutive uninterrupted regular season games with at least one touchdown pass.

Tom Brady holds the record for most consecutive uninterrupted regular season games with at least one touchdown pass with 52, setting the record on December 2, 2012, surpassing Brees's 43, and ending at Cincinnati on October 6, 2013. Both players had surpassed Favre's record of 36, set in 2004.

Bold denotes an active streak; minimum 22 consecutive regular season games.

Rank	Quarterback	Period	Team	Consecutive games	Reference
1	Tom Brady	December 9, 2010 – September 29, 2013	New England Patriots	52	
2	Peyton Manning	September 9, 2012 – November 30, 2014	Denver Broncos	44	
3	Drew Brees	September 9, 2010 – November 25, 2012	New Orleans Saints	43	
4	Drew Brees	September 12, 2012 – September 20, 2015	New Orleans Saints	38	
5	Brett Favre	October 20, 2002 – November 29, 2004	Green Bay Packers	36	
6	Kirk Cousins	September 27, 2020 - September 10, 2022	Minnesota Vikings	35	
7	Matt Ryan	December 20, 2015 – November 26, 2017	Atlanta Falcons	30	
8T	Dave Krieg	November 12, 1983 – October 11, 1985	Seattle Seahawks	28	
8T	Tony Romo	January 10, 2012 – December 22, 2013	Dallas Cowboys	28	
8T	Philip Rivers	September 12, 2012 – October 23, 2014	San Diego Chargers	28	
11T	Peyton Manning	September 27, 1998 – December 19, 1999	Indianapolis Colts	27	
11T	Philip Rivers	January 10, 2017 – December 13, 2018	Los Angeles Chargers	27	
13	Johnny Unitas	September 12, 1956 – February 11, 1958	Baltimore Colts	26	
14T	Daryle Lamonica	August 12, 1968 – November 15, 1970	Oakland Raiders	25	
14T	Dan Marino	October 11, 1985 – September 20, 1987	Miami Dolphins	25	
16T	Daunte Culpepper	October 9, 2000 – November 19, 2001	Minnesota Vikings	24	
16T	Tom Brady	October 27, 2013 – December 21, 2014	New England Patriots	24	
18T	Frank Ryan	December 19, 1965 – May 11, 1967	Cleveland Browns	23	
18T	Sonny Jurgensen	November 27, 1966 – October 20, 1968	Washington Redskins	23	
18T	Kurt Warner	December 9, 1999 – October 22, 2000	St. Louis Rams	23	
18T	Steve McNair	October 14, 2001 – November 17, 2002	Tennessee Titans	23	
18T	Philip Rivers	April 10, 2009 – November 22, 2010	San Diego Chargers	23	
23T	Cecil Isbell	September 14, 1941 – June 12, 1942	Green Bay Packers	22	
23T	Kurt Warner	November 11, 2007 – December 14, 2008	Arizona Cardinals	22	
23T	Matt Ryan	September 18, 2011 – October 28, 2012	Atlanta Falcons	22	
23T	Aaron Rodgers	August 11, 2015 – 12/11/16	Green Bay Packers	22	
23T	Patrick Mahomes	November 19, 2019 – 12/27/20	Kansas City Chiefs	22	

Note: Unitas' official streak was interrupted by an injury after 21 consecutive games with a touchdown pass. Brees' official streak of 54 games was interrupted by not playing week 17 of the 2009 regular season after 11 consecutive games with a touchdown pass. Brees other official streak of 20+ games with a touchdown pass was interrupted by an injury and did not play week 3 of the 2015 season after 38 consecutive games with a touchdown pass. Marino's official streak was interrupted by the 1987 NFL players' strike after 25 consecutive games with a touchdown pass. Manning's official streak was interrupted after sustaining a neck injury which caused him to miss the entire 2011 season after 7 consecutive games with a touchdown pass.

==== All-time consecutive uninterrupted games with at least two touchdown passes ====
Bold denotes an active streak; minimum 10 consecutive regular season games.

Rank	Quarterback	Period	Team	Consecutive games	Reference
1	Peyton Manning	November 24, 2013 – September 11, 2014	Denver Broncos	15	
2	Patrick Mahomes	October 14, 2018 – September 22, 2019	Kansas City Chiefs	14	
3T	Peyton Manning	September 9, 2004 – December 12, 2004	Indianapolis Colts	13	
3T	Tom Brady	July 11, 2010 – February 10, 2011	New England Patriots	13	
3T	Aaron Rodgers	August 9, 2011 – November 12, 2011	Green Bay Packers	13	
3T	Philip Rivers	December 31, 2017 – February 12, 2018	Los Angeles Chargers	13	
7T	Johnny Unitas	September 27, 1959 – December 12, 1959	Baltimore Colts	12	
7T	Don Meredith	October 31, 1965 – September 10, 1966	Dallas Cowboys	12	
7T	Brett Favre	June 11, 1994 – September 24, 1995	Green Bay Packers	12	
10T	Peyton Manning	December 23, 2012 – October 11, 2013	Denver Broncos	11	
10T	Cam Newton	September 16, 2018 – February 12, 2018	Carolina Panthers	11	
12T	Dan Marino	February 9, 1984 – April 11, 1984	Miami Dolphins	10	
12T	Dan Marino	February 11, 1986 – September 20, 1987	Miami Dolphins	10	
12T	Tom Brady	September 9, 2007 – November 18, 2007	New England Patriots	10	
12T	Tom Brady	May 10, 2014 – December 14, 2014	New England Patriots	10	
12T	Philip Rivers	October 30, 2016 – November 9, 2017	San Diego/Los Angeles Chargers	10	

==== All-time consecutive uninterrupted games with at least three touchdown passes ====
Bold denotes an active streak; minimum 5 consecutive regular season games.

Rank	Quarterback	Period	Team	Consecutive games	Reference
1	Tom Brady	September 9, 2007 – November 18, 2007	New England Patriots	10	
2T	Peyton Manning	October 10, 2004 – May 12, 2004	Indianapolis Colts	8	
2T	Andrew Luck	September 30, 2018 – November 25, 2018	Indianapolis Colts	8	
2T	Joe Burrow	November 3, 2024 – December 28, 2024	Cincinnati Bengals	8	
4T	Bobby Layne	October 28, 1951 – November 22, 1951	Detroit Lions	5	
4T	Dan Marino	July 12, 1986 – September 20, 1987	Miami Dolphins	5	
4T	Steve Young	June 9, 1998 – November 10, 1998	San Francisco 49ers	5	
4T	Aaron Rodgers	October 16, 2011 – November 20, 2011	Green Bay Packers	5	
4T	Peyton Manning	September 30, 2012 – April 11, 2012	Denver Broncos	5	
4T	Aaron Rodgers	December 16, 2012 – September 15, 2013	Green Bay Packers	5	
4T	Russell Wilson	November 22, 2015 – December 20, 2015	Seattle Seahawks	5	

==== All-time consecutive uninterrupted games with at least four touchdown passes ====
Bold denotes an active streak; minimum 3 consecutive regular season games.

Rank	Quarterback	Period	Team	Consecutive games	Reference
1	Peyton Manning	October 31, 2004 – November 25, 2004	Indianapolis Colts	5	
2	Dan Marino	November 26, 1984 – December 17, 1984	Miami Dolphins	4	
3T	Drew Brees	December 18, 2011 – January 1, 2012	New Orleans Saints	3	
3T	Patrick Mahomes	October 14, 2018 – October 28, 2018	Kansas City Chiefs	3	
3T	Russell Wilson	September 13, 2020 – September 27, 2020	Seattle Seahawks	3	

==== All-time consecutive uninterrupted games with at least five touchdown passes ====
Bold denotes an active streak; minimum 2 consecutive regular season games.

Rank	Quarterback	Period	Team	Consecutive games	Reference
1T	Daunte Culpepper	October 10, 2004 – October 17, 2004	Minnesota Vikings	2	
1T	Tom Brady	October 14, 2007 – October 21, 2007	New England Patriots	2	
1T	Ben Roethlisberger	October 26, 2014 – February 11, 2014	Pittsburgh Steelers	2	
1T	Russell Wilson	September 20, 2020 – September 27, 2020	Seattle Seahawks	2	

==== All-time consecutive uninterrupted games with at least six touchdown passes ====
Bold denotes an active streak; minimum 2 consecutive regular season games.

Rank	Quarterback	Period	Team	Consecutive games	Reference
1	Ben Roethlisberger	October 26, 2014 – February 11, 2014	Pittsburgh Steelers	2	

=== Home records ===
==== All-time consecutive regular season games with at least one touchdown pass at home ====
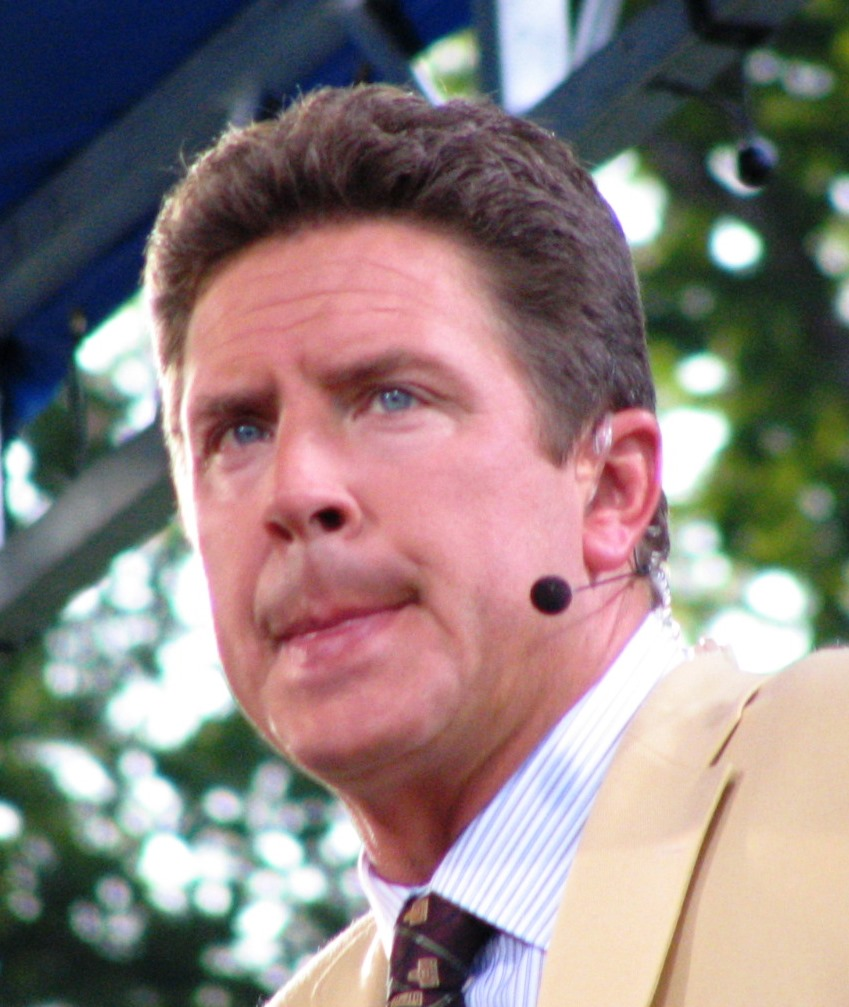
Dan Marino held the record for consecutive games with 1+ touchdown passes at home for twenty-five years before being surpassed in 2013.

Drew Brees holds the record for consecutive games with a touchdown pass at home. He has held the record since 2015 when he surpassed Tom Brady. Brady had surpassed the previous record in 2013 held by Dan Marino, which he set in 1988. Prior to that, Johnny Unitas held the record.

Bold denotes an active streak; minimum 20 consecutive regular season games.

Rank	Quarterback	Period	Team	Stadium	Consecutive games	Reference
1	Drew Brees	October 18, 2009 – November 27, 2016	New Orleans Saints	Mercedes-Benz Superdome	60	
2	Tom Brady	September 14, 2009 – December 14, 2014	New England Patriots	Gillette Stadium	47	
3	Ben Roethlisberger	December 19, 2010 – September 17, 2017	Pittsburgh Steelers	Heinz Field	45	
4	Dan Marino	September 10, 1983 – November 14, 1988	Miami Dolphins	Miami Orange Bowl/Joe Robbie Stadium	39	
5	Aaron Rodgers	May 10, 2008 – February 12, 2012	Green Bay Packers	Lambeau Field	35	
6T	Johnny Unitas	December 23, 1956 – September 30, 1962	Baltimore Colts	Memorial Stadium	34	
6T	Aaron Rodgers	September 14, 2014 – September 12, 2018	Green Bay Packers	Lambeau Field	34	
8	Andrew Luck	December 15, 2013 – November 25, 2018	Indianapolis Colts	Lucas Oil Stadium	27	
9T	Warren Moon	December 20, 1987 – October 27, 1991	Houston Oilers	Houston Astrodome	26	
9T	Peyton Manning	November 28, 2010 – November 23, 2014	Indianapolis Colts/Denver Broncos	Lucas Oil Stadium/Sports Authority Field at Mile High	26	
11	Ryan Tannehill	October 23, 2016 – September 26, 2021	Miami Dolphins/Tennessee Titans	Hard Rock Stadium/Nissan Stadium	25	
12T	Chris Chandler	September 14, 1997 – September 24, 2000	Atlanta Falcons	Georgia Dome	24	
12T	Peyton Manning	December 24, 2000 – December 14, 2003	Indianapolis Colts	RCA Dome	24	
12T	Brett Favre	April 11, 2002 – September 10, 2005	Green Bay Packers	Lambeau Field	24	
15T	Philip Rivers	December 16, 2012 – September 11, 2015	San Diego Chargers	Qualcomm Stadium	23	
15T	Joe Flacco	July 9, 2014 – January 10, 2017	Baltimore Ravens	M&T Bank Stadium	23	
15T	Carson Wentz	November 12, 2016 – December 22, 2019	Philadelphia Eagles	Lincoln Financial Field	23	
18T	Steve Bartkowski	October 26, 1980 – October 30, 1983	Atlanta Falcons	Atlanta–Fulton County Stadium	22	
18T	Brett Favre	November 28, 1993 – October 14, 1996	Green Bay Packers	Milwaukee County Stadium/Lambeau Field	22	
18T	Peyton Manning	June 9, 1998 – November 26, 2000	Indianapolis Colts	RCA Dome	22	
21T	John Brodie	November 16, 1969 – December 16, 1972	San Francisco 49ers	Kezar Stadium/Candlestick Park	20	
21T	Ken Stabler	December 14, 1975 – November 26, 1978	Oakland Raiders	Oakland–Alameda County Coliseum	20	
21T	Kurt Warner	November 11, 2007 – December 27, 2009	Arizona Cardinals	University of Phoenix Stadium	20	
21T	Matt Ryan	December 27, 2009 – October 14, 2012	Atlanta Falcons	Georgia Dome	20	
21T	Jay Cutler	November 25, 2012 – January 11, 2015	Chicago Bears	Soldier Field	20	
21T	Kirk Cousins	January 1, 2017 – October 13, 2019	Washington Redskins/Minnesota Vikings	FedEx Field/U.S. Bank Stadium	20	

==== All-time consecutive regular season games with at least two touchdown passes at home ====
Drew Brees' streak of 21 consecutive games with at least two touchdown passes at home is the longest of all time. Brett Favre held the previous record of 14, which he established in 1996. Favre had surpassed Jim Everett's home mark of 11, which he had set in 1990. Brees has held the record since 2012.

Bold denotes an active streak; minimum 10 consecutive regular season games.

Rank	Quarterback	Period	Team	Stadium	Consecutive games	Reference
1	Drew Brees	September 18, 2011 – October 11, 2013	New Orleans Saints	Mercedes-Benz Superdome	21	
2	Peyton Manning	November 28, 2010 – October 27, 2013	Indianapolis Colts/Denver Broncos	Lucas Oil Stadium/Sports Authority Field at Mile High	17	
3	Brett Favre	June 11, 1994 – September 15, 1996	Green Bay Packers	Milwaukee County Stadium/Lambeau Field	14	
4	Aaron Rodgers	September 14, 2014 – November 15, 2015	Green Bay Packers	Lambeau Field	13	
5	Kurt Warner	December 9, 1999 – October 15, 2000	St. Louis Rams	Trans World Dome	12	
6T	Jim Everett	September 17, 1989 – October 21, 1990	Los Angeles Rams	Anaheim Stadium	11	
6T	Ryan Fitzpatrick	February 11, 2014 – November 9, 2016	Houston/NY Jets	NRG Stadium/MetLife Stadium	11	
6T	Ben Roethlisberger	August 11, 2015 – September 17, 2017	Pittsburgh Steelers	Heinz Field	11	
6T	Andrew Luck	September 10, 2016 – November 25, 2018	Indianapolis Colts	Lucas Oil Stadium	11	

==== All-time consecutive regular season games with at least three touchdown passes at home ====
Bold denotes an active streak; minimum 5 consecutive regular season games.

Rank	Quarterback	Period	Team	Stadium	Consecutive games	Reference
1	Peyton Manning	September 30, 2012 – September 29, 2013	Denver Broncos	Sports Authority Field at Mile High	9	
2	Drew Brees	January 11, 2015 – October 16, 2016	New Orleans Saints	Mercedes-Benz Superdome	8	
3T	Drew Brees	November 28, 2011 – July 10, 2012	New Orleans Saints	Mercedes-Benz Superdome	7	
3T	Ben Roethlisberger	November 15, 2015 – November 13, 2016	Pittsburgh Steelers	Heinz Field	7	
5T	Peyton Manning	September 26, 2004 – May 12, 2004	Indianapolis Colts	RCA Dome	6	
5T	Peyton Manning	July 9, 2014 – November 23, 2014	Denver Broncos	Sports Authority Field at Mile High	6	
7T	Steve Bartkowski	December 14, 1980 – October 18, 1981	Atlanta Falcons	Atlanta–Fulton County Stadium	5	
7T	Steve Young	November 20, 1994 – September 17, 1995	San Francisco 49ers	Candlestick Park	5	
7T	Steve Beuerlein	July 11, 1999 – February 1, 2000	Carolina Panthers	Ericsson Stadium	5	
7T	Tony Romo	September 15, 2008 – November 27, 2008	Dallas Cowboys	Texas Stadium	5	
7T	Aaron Rodgers	August 9, 2011 – November 20, 2011	Green Bay Packers	Lambeau Field	5	
7T	Aaron Rodgers	September 14, 2014 – November 16, 2014	Green Bay Packers	Lambeau Field	5	
7T	Andrew Luck	September 30, 2018 – November 25, 2018	Indianapolis Colts	Lucas Oil Stadium	5	

==== All-time consecutive regular season games with at least four touchdown passes at home ====
Bold denotes an active streak; minimum 3 consecutive regular season games.

Rank	Quarterback	Period	Team	Stadium	Consecutive games	Reference
1T	Dan Marino	November 26, 1984 – December 17, 1984	Miami Dolphins	Miami Orange Bowl	3	
1T	Drew Brees	September 30, 2013 – October 11, 2013	New Orleans Saints	Mercedes-Benz Superdome	3	
1T	Drew Brees	April 11, 2018 – November 22, 2018	New Orleans Saints	Mercedes-Benz Superdome	3	

==== All-time consecutive regular season games with at least five touchdown passes at home ====
Bold denotes an active streak; minimum 2 consecutive regular season games.

Rank	Quarterback	Period	Team	Stadium	Consecutive games	Reference
1T	Ben Roethlisberger	October 26, 2014 – February 11, 2014	Pittsburgh Steelers	Heinz Field	2	
1T	Russell Wilson	September 20, 2020 – September 27, 2020	Settle Seahawks	CenturyLink Field	2	

==== All-time consecutive regular season games with at least six touchdown passes at home ====
Bold denotes an active streak; minimum 2 consecutive regular season games.

Rank	Quarterback	Period	Team	Stadium	Consecutive games	Reference
1	Ben Roethlisberger	October 26, 2014 – February 11, 2014	Pittsburgh Steelers	Heinz Field	2	

=== Road records ===
==== All-time consecutive regular season games with at least one touchdown pass on the road ====
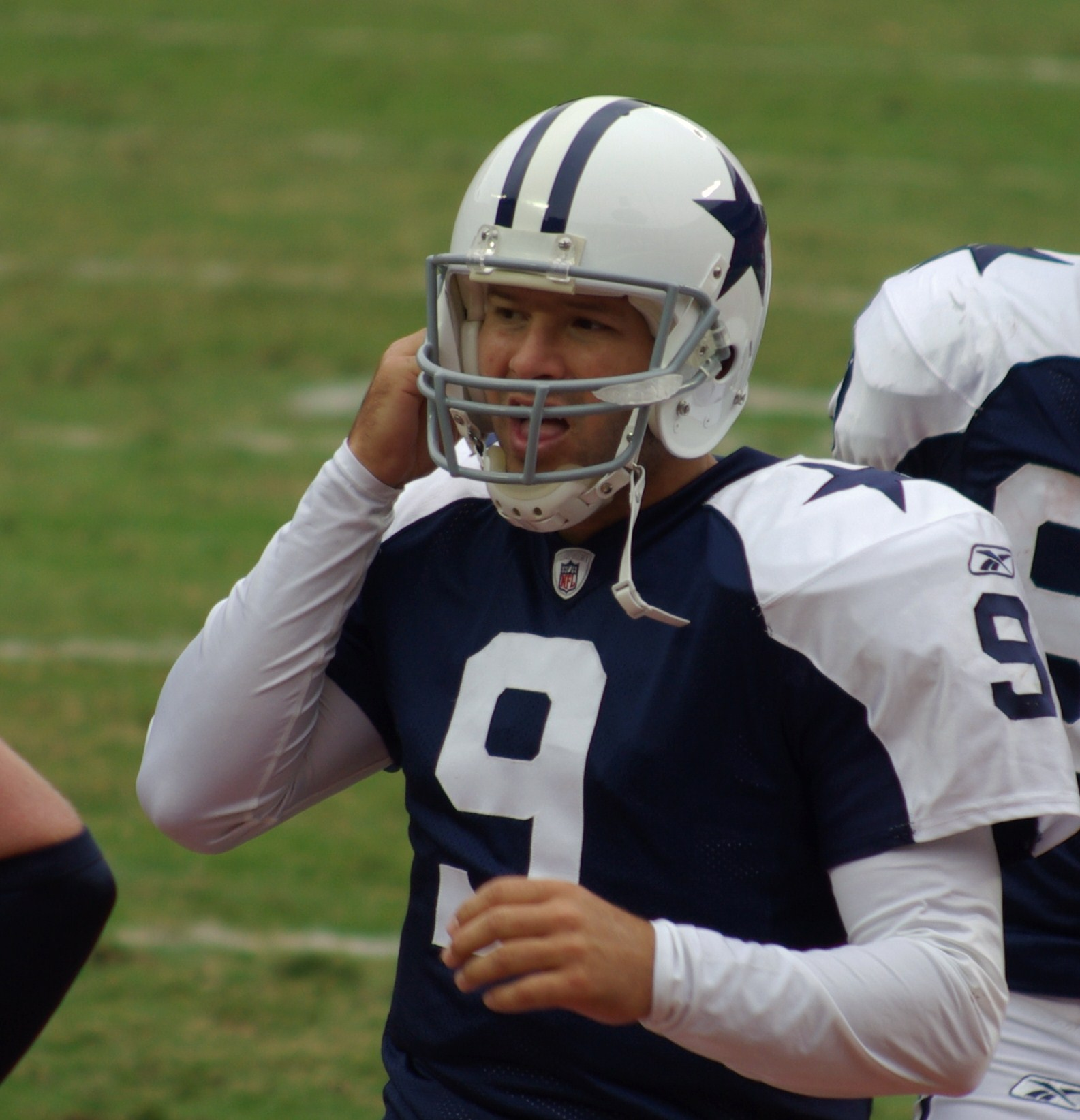
Tony Romo holds the record for the most consecutive road games with 1+ touchdown passes in NFL history.

Tony Romo's streak of 41 consecutive road games with at least one touchdown pass is the longest of all time, which he set in 2014. He surpassed the previous record of 32, which had been held by Favre for 10 seasons. Johnny Unitas held the previous mark of 22 since 1960 until surpassed by Favre in 2003.

Bold denotes an active streak; minimum 20 consecutive regular season games.

Rank	Quarterback	Period	Team	Consecutive games	Reference
1	Tony Romo	November 10, 2009 – December 28, 2014	Dallas Cowboys	41	
2	Matt Ryan	September 25, 2011 – June 12, 2015	Atlanta Falcons	37	
3	Peyton Manning	December 9, 2010 – September 27, 2015	Indianapolis Colts/Denver Broncos	34	
4	Brett Favre	November 27, 2000 – November 21, 2004	Green Bay Packers	32	
5	Aaron Brooks	November 26, 2000 – September 26, 2004	New Orleans Saints	27	
6T	Drew Brees	October 25, 2009 – November 18, 2012	New Orleans Saints	26	
6T	Tom Brady	September 19, 2010 – September 29, 2013	New England Patriots	26	
8T	Johnny Unitas	September 12, 1956 – November 13, 1960	Baltimore Colts	22	
8T	Dan Fouts	October 21, 1979 – December 9, 1982	San Diego Chargers	22	
8T	Marc Bulger	September 21, 2003 – October 29, 2006	St. Louis Rams	22	
8T	Drew Brees	September 12, 2012 – November 15, 2015	New Orleans Saints	22	
8T	Russell Wilson	June 10, 2013 – March 1, 2016	Seattle Seahawks	22	
8T	Philip Rivers	September 10, 2016 – December 30, 2018	San Diego/Los Angeles Chargers	22	
14T	Chris Chandler	October 22, 1995 – December 20, 1998	Houston Oilers/Atlanta Falcons	21	
14T	Brian Griese	September 26, 1999 – October 27, 2002	Denver Broncos	21	
14T	Kirk Cousins	September 21, 2014 – October 23, 2017	Washington Redskins	21	
17T	Daryle Lamonica	September 15, 1968 – June 12, 1970	Oakland Raiders	20	
17T	Dave Krieg	December 13, 1981 – October 11, 1985	Seattle Seahawks	20	

==== All-time consecutive regular season games with at least two touchdown passes on the road ====
Bold denotes an active streak; minimum 10 consecutive regular season games.

Rank	Quarterback	Period	Team	Consecutive games	Reference
1	Tom Brady	July 11, 2010 – September 9, 2012	New England Patriots	14	
2	Peyton Manning	September 15, 2013 – September 11, 2014	Denver Broncos	12	
3T	Brett Favre	October 21, 2001 – November 17, 2002	Green Bay Packers	11	
3T	Tom Brady	September 14, 2003 – July 11, 2004	New England Patriots	11	
3T	Matt Ryan	April 11, 2018 – October 11, 2019	Atlanta Falcons	11	

==== All-time consecutive regular season games with at least three touchdown passes on the road ====
Bold denotes an active streak; minimum 5 consecutive regular season games.

Rank	Quarterback	Period	Team	Consecutive games	Reference
1	Patrick Mahomes	October 14, 2018 – September 15, 2019	Kansas City Chiefs	7	
2	Tom Brady	September 9, 2007 – November 18, 2007	New England Patriots	6	
3T	Dan Marino	November 16, 1986 – September 20, 1987	Miami Dolphins	5	
3T	Brett Favre	November 20, 1994 – November 9, 1995	Green Bay Packers	5	

==== All-time consecutive regular season games with at least four touchdown passes on the road ====
Bold denotes an active streak; minimum 3 consecutive regular season games.

Rank	Quarterback	Period	Team	Consecutive games	Reference
1T	Peyton Manning	October 31, 2004 – November 25, 2004	Indianapolis Colts	3	
1T	Peyton Manning	January 12, 2013 – December 29, 2013	Denver Broncos	3	

==== All-time consecutive regular season games with at least five touchdown passes on the road ====
Bold denotes an active streak; minimum 2 consecutive regular season games.

Rank	Quarterback	Period	Team	Consecutive games	Reference
1T	Daunte Culpepper	October 10, 2004 – October 17, 2004	Minnesota Vikings	2	
1T	Tom Brady	October 14, 2007 – October 21, 2007	New England Patriots	2	
1T	Cam Newton	June 12, 2015 – December 20, 2015	Carolina Panthers	2	

=== Stadium records ===
==== All-time consecutive regular season games with at least one touchdown pass at a stadium ====
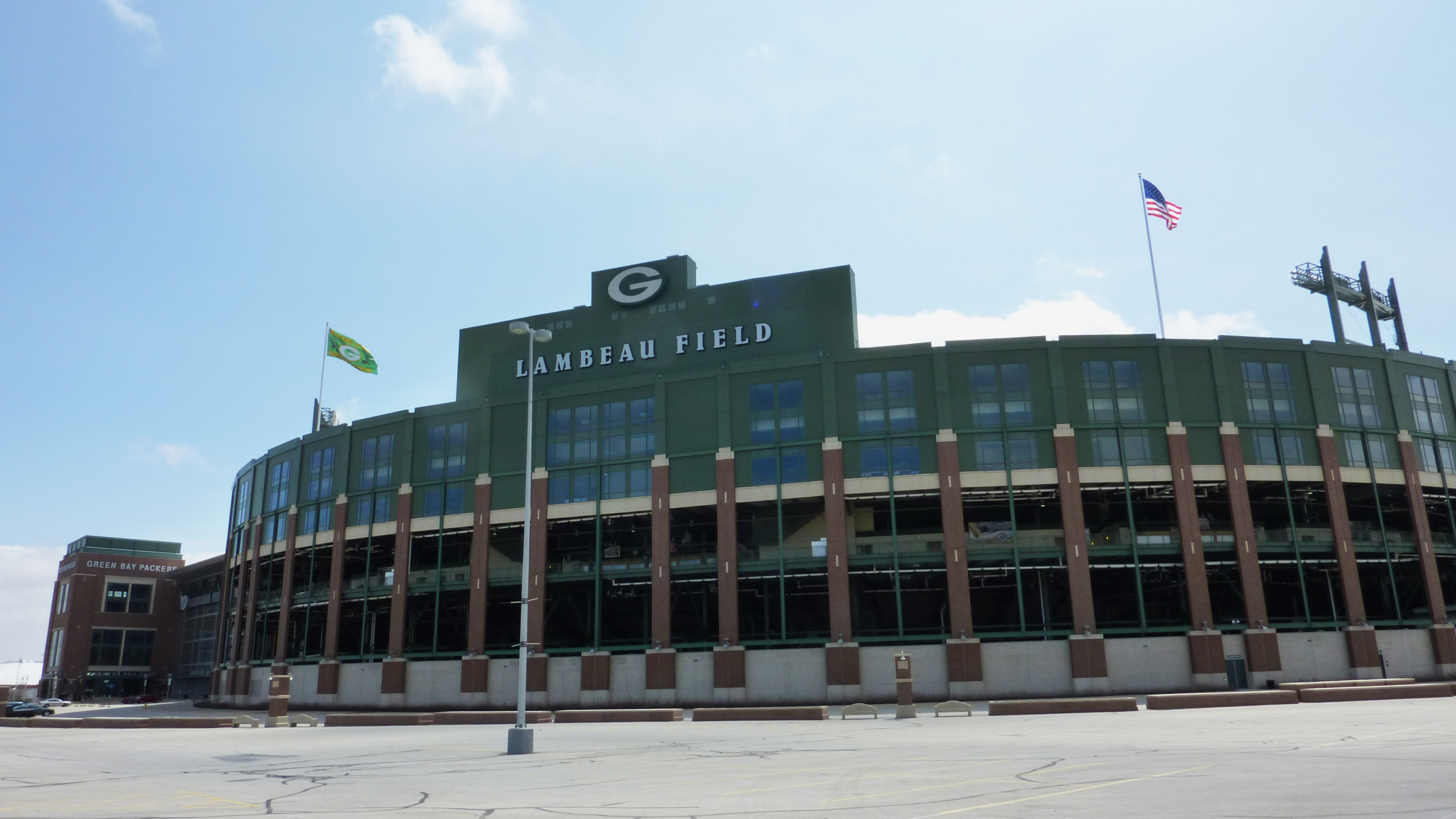
There have been four streaks of 1+ touchdown passes of at least 20 games at Lambeau Field, the most of any venue in NFL history.

Drew Brees (Mercedes-Benz Superdome) holds the record for consecutive games with a touchdown pass at a specific stadium venue. He has held the record since 2015 when he surpassed Tom Brady (Gillette Stadium). Brady had surpassed the previous record in 2013 held by Aaron Rodgers (Lambeau Field), which he set in 2012. Prior to that, Johnny Unitas (Memorial Stadium) held the record.

Bold denotes an active streak; minimum 20 consecutive regular season games.

Rank	Quarterback	Period	Team	Stadium	Consecutive games	Reference
1	Drew Brees	October 18, 2009 – November 27, 2016	New Orleans Saints	Mercedes-Benz Superdome	60	
2	Tom Brady	September 14, 2009 – December 14, 2014	New England Patriots	Gillette Stadium	47	
3	Ben Roethlisberger	December 19, 2010 – September 17, 2017	Pittsburgh Steelers	Heinz Field	45	
4	Aaron Rodgers	May 10, 2008 – February 12, 2012	Green Bay Packers	Lambeau Field	35	
5T	Johnny Unitas	December 23, 1956 – September 30, 1962	Baltimore Colts	Memorial Stadium	34	
5T	Aaron Rodgers	September 14, 2014 – September 12, 2018	Green Bay Packers	Lambeau Field	34	
7	Dan Marino	September 10, 1983 – December 22, 1986	Miami Dolphins	Miami Orange Bowl	28	
8	Andrew Luck	December 15, 2013 – November 25, 2018	Indianapolis Colts	Lucas Oil Stadium	27	
9	Warren Moon	December 20, 1987 – October 27, 1991	Houston Oilers	Houston Astrodome	26	
10	Brett Favre	September 20, 1992 – October 14, 1996	Green Bay Packers	Lambeau Field	25	
11T	Chris Chandler	September 14, 1997 – September 24, 2000	Atlanta Falcons	Georgia Dome	24	
11T	Peyton Manning	December 24, 2000 – December 14, 2003	Indianapolis Colts	RCA Dome	24	
11T	Brett Favre	April 11, 2002 – September 10, 2005	Green Bay Packers	Lambeau Field	24	
11T	Peyton Manning	October 29, 2006 – November 23, 2014	Indianapolis Colts/Denver Broncos	Invesco Field/Sports Authority Field at Mile High	24	
15T	Philip Rivers	December 16, 2012 – September 11, 2015	San Diego Chargers	Qualcomm Stadium	23	
15T	Joe Flacco	July 9, 2014 – January 10, 2017	Baltimore Ravens	M&T Bank Stadium	23	
15T	Carson Wentz	November 12, 2016 – December 22, 2019	Philadelphia Eagles	Lincoln Financial Field	23	
18T	Steve Bartkowski	October 26, 1980 – October 30, 1983	Atlanta Falcons	Atlanta–Fulton County Stadium	22	
18T	Peyton Manning	June 9, 1998 – November 26, 2000	Indianapolis Colts	RCA Dome	22	
20T	Ken Stabler	December 14, 1975 – November 26, 1978	Oakland Raiders	Oakland–Alameda County Coliseum	20	
20T	Kurt Warner	November 11, 2007 – December 27, 2009	Arizona Cardinals	University of Phoenix Stadium	20	
20T	Matt Ryan	December 27, 2009 – October 14, 2012	Atlanta Falcons	Georgia Dome	20	
20T	Jay Cutler	November 25, 2012 – January 11, 2015	Chicago Bears	Soldier Field	20	

==== All-time consecutive regular season games with at least two touchdown passes at a stadium ====
Drew Brees' streak of 21 consecutive games with at least two touchdown passes at a specific stadium venue (Mercedes-Benz Superdome) is the longest of all time. Brett Favre held the previous record of 12 (Lambeau Field), which he established in 1996. The stadium record was tied by Kurt Warner (Trans World Dome) in 2000. Favre had surpassed Jim Everett's stadium mark of 11 (Anaheim Stadium), which he had set in 1990. Brees has held the record since 2012.

Bold denotes an active streak; minimum 10 consecutive regular season games.

Rank	Quarterback	Period	Team	Stadium	Consecutive games	Reference
1	Drew Brees	September 18, 2011 – October 11, 2013	New Orleans Saints	Mercedes-Benz Superdome	21	
2	Peyton Manning	October 29, 2006 – October 27, 2013	Indianapolis Colts/Denver Broncos	Invesco Field/Sports Authority Field at Mile High	15	
3	Aaron Rodgers	September 14, 2014 – November 15, 2015	Green Bay Packers	Lambeau Field	13	
4T	Brett Favre	November 13, 1994 – September 15, 1996	Green Bay Packers	Lambeau Field	12	
4T	Kurt Warner	December 9, 1999 – October 15, 2000	St. Louis Rams	Trans World Dome	12	
6T	Jim Everett	September 17, 1989 – October 21, 1990	Los Angeles Rams	Anaheim Stadium	11	
6T	Brett Favre	December 17, 2000 – October 18, 2009	Green Bay Packers/Minnesota Vikings	Hubert H. Humphrey Metrodome	11	
6T	Ben Roethlisberger	August 11, 2015 – September 17, 2017	Pittsburgh Steelers	Heinz Field	11	
6T	Andrew Luck	September 10, 2016 – November 25, 2018	Indianapolis Colts	Lucas Oil Stadium	11	
10	Ryan Fitzpatrick	September 13, 2015 – November 9, 2016	New York Jets	MetLife Stadium	10	

==== All-time consecutive regular season games with at least three touchdown passes at a stadium ====
Bold denotes an active streak; minimum 5 consecutive regular season games.

Rank	Quarterback	Period	Team	Stadium	Consecutive games	Reference
1	Peyton Manning	September 30, 2012 – September 29, 2013	Denver Broncos	Sports Authority Field at Mile High	9	
2	Drew Brees	January 11, 2015 – October 16, 2016	New Orleans Saints	Mercedes-Benz Superdome	8	
3T	Drew Brees	November 28, 2011 – July 10, 2012	New Orleans Saints	Mercedes-Benz Superdome	7	
3T	Ben Roethlisberger	November 15, 2015 – November 13, 2016	Pittsburgh Steelers	Heinz Field	7	
5T	Peyton Manning	September 26, 2004 – May 12, 2004	Indianapolis Colts	RCA Dome	6	
5T	Peyton Manning	July 9, 2014 – November 23, 2014	Denver Broncos	Sports Authority Field at Mile High	6	
7T	Steve Bartkowski	December 14, 1980 – October 18, 1981	Atlanta Falcons	Atlanta–Fulton County Stadium	5	
7T	Steve Young	November 20, 1994 – September 17, 1995	San Francisco 49ers	Candlestick Park	5	
7T	Steve Beuerlein	July 11, 1999 – February 1, 2000	Carolina Panthers	Ericsson Stadium	5	
7T	Tony Romo	September 15, 2008 – November 27, 2008	Dallas Cowboys	Texas Stadium	5	
7T	Aaron Rodgers	August 9, 2011 – November 20, 2011	Green Bay Packers	Lambeau Field	5	
7T	Aaron Rodgers	September 14, 2014 – November 16, 2014	Green Bay Packers	Lambeau Field	5	
7T	Andrew Luck	September 30, 2018 – November 25, 2018	Indianapolis Colts	Lucas Oil Stadium	5	

==== All-time consecutive regular season games with at least four touchdown passes at a stadium ====
Bold denotes an active streak; minimum 3 consecutive regular season games.

Rank	Quarterback	Period	Team	Stadium	Consecutive games	Reference
1T	Dan Marino	November 26, 1984 – December 17, 1984	Miami Dolphins	Miami Orange Bowl	3	
1T	Drew Brees	September 30, 2013 – October 11, 2013	New Orleans Saints	Mercedes-Benz Superdome	3	
1T	Drew Brees	April 11, 2018 – November 22, 2018	New Orleans Saints	Mercedes-Benz Superdome	3	

==== All-time consecutive regular season games with at least five touchdown passes at a stadium ====
Bold denotes an active streak; minimum 2 consecutive regular season games.

Rank	Quarterback	Period	Team	Stadium	Consecutive games	Reference
1T	Dan Marino	September 21, 1986 – November 27, 1988	Miami Dolphins	The Meadowlands	2	
1T	Ben Roethlisberger	October 26, 2014 – February 11, 2014	Pittsburgh Steelers	Heinz Field	2	
1T	Russell Wilson	September 20, 2020 – September 27, 2020	Settle Seahawks	CenturyLink Field	2	

==== All-time consecutive regular season games with at least six touchdown passes at a stadium ====
Bold denotes an active streak; minimum 2 consecutive regular season games.

Rank	Quarterback	Period	Team	Stadium	Consecutive games	Reference
1	Ben Roethlisberger	October 26, 2014 – February 11, 2014	Pittsburgh Steelers	Heinz Field	2	

== Postseason ==
=== Overall playoff games ===
==== All-time consecutive playoff games with at least one touchdown pass ====
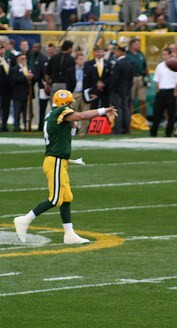
Brett Favre holds the record for consecutive playoff games with at least one touchdown pass.

Brett Favre's streak of 20 consecutive games with at least one touchdown pass in the post-season is the longest of all-time. Dan Marino held the previous record of 13 which was surpassed by Favre in 2004.

Bold denotes an active streak; minimum 10 consecutive post season games.

Rank	Quarterback	Period	Team	Consecutive games	Reference
1	Brett Favre	December 31, 1995 – January 24, 2010	Green Bay Packers/Minnesota Vikings	20	
2T	Tom Brady	March 2, 2002 – January 22, 2012	New England Patriots	18	
2T	Drew Brees	August 1, 2005 – January 17, 2021	San Diego Chargers/New Orleans Saints	18	
4	Aaron Rodgers	June 2, 2011 – January 24, 2021	Green Bay Packers	16	
5	Tom Brady	January 19, 2014 – January 20, 2019	New England Patriots	14	
6T	Dan Marino	December 31, 1983 – December 30, 1995	Miami Dolphins	13	
6T	Peyton Manning	January 21, 2007 – November 1, 2015	Indianapolis Colts/Denver Broncos	13	
6T	**Russell Wilson**	**January 19, 2014 – present**	**Seattle Seahawks**	**13**	
9	Kurt Warner	January 16, 2000 – October 1, 2010	St. Louis Rams/Arizona Cardinals	12	
10T	Ken Stabler	December 30, 1973 – January 1, 1978	Oakland Raiders	10	
10T	Joe Montana	January 1, 1989 – January 16, 1994	San Francisco 49ers/Kansas City Chiefs	10	
10T	Matt Hasselbeck	August 1, 2005 – January 16, 2011	Seattle Seahawks	10	
10T	**Joe Flacco**	**September 1, 2011 – present**	**Baltimore Ravens**	**10**	

==== All-time consecutive playoff games with at least two touchdown passes ====
Bold denotes an active streak; minimum 5 consecutive post season games.

Rank	Quarterback	Period	Team	Consecutive games	Reference
1	Aaron Rodgers	October 1, 2016 – January 24, 2021	Green Bay Packers	9	
**2**	**Joe Flacco**	**January 15, 2012 – present**	**Baltimore Ravens**	**8**	
3T	Terry Bradshaw	December 30, 1978 – September 1, 1983	Pittsburgh Steelers	7	
3T	Joe Montana	January 1, 1989 – December 1, 1991	San Francisco 49ers	7	
3T	Drew Brees	January 21, 2007 – January 14, 2012	New Orleans Saints	7	
6	Tom Brady	January 14, 2017 – April 2, 2018	New England Patriots	6	
7T	Bernie Kosar	November 1, 1987 – January 14, 1990	Cleveland Browns	5	
7T	Troy Aikman	October 1, 1993 – January 23, 1994	Dallas Cowboys	5	
7T	Kurt Warner	March 1, 2009 – October 1, 2010	Arizona Cardinals	5	
7T	Matt Ryan	January 13, 2013 – May 2, 2017	Atlanta Falcons	5	
7T	Tom Brady	September 1, 2021 – January 16, 2022	Tampa Bay Buccaneers	5	

==== All-time consecutive playoff games with at least three touchdown passes ====
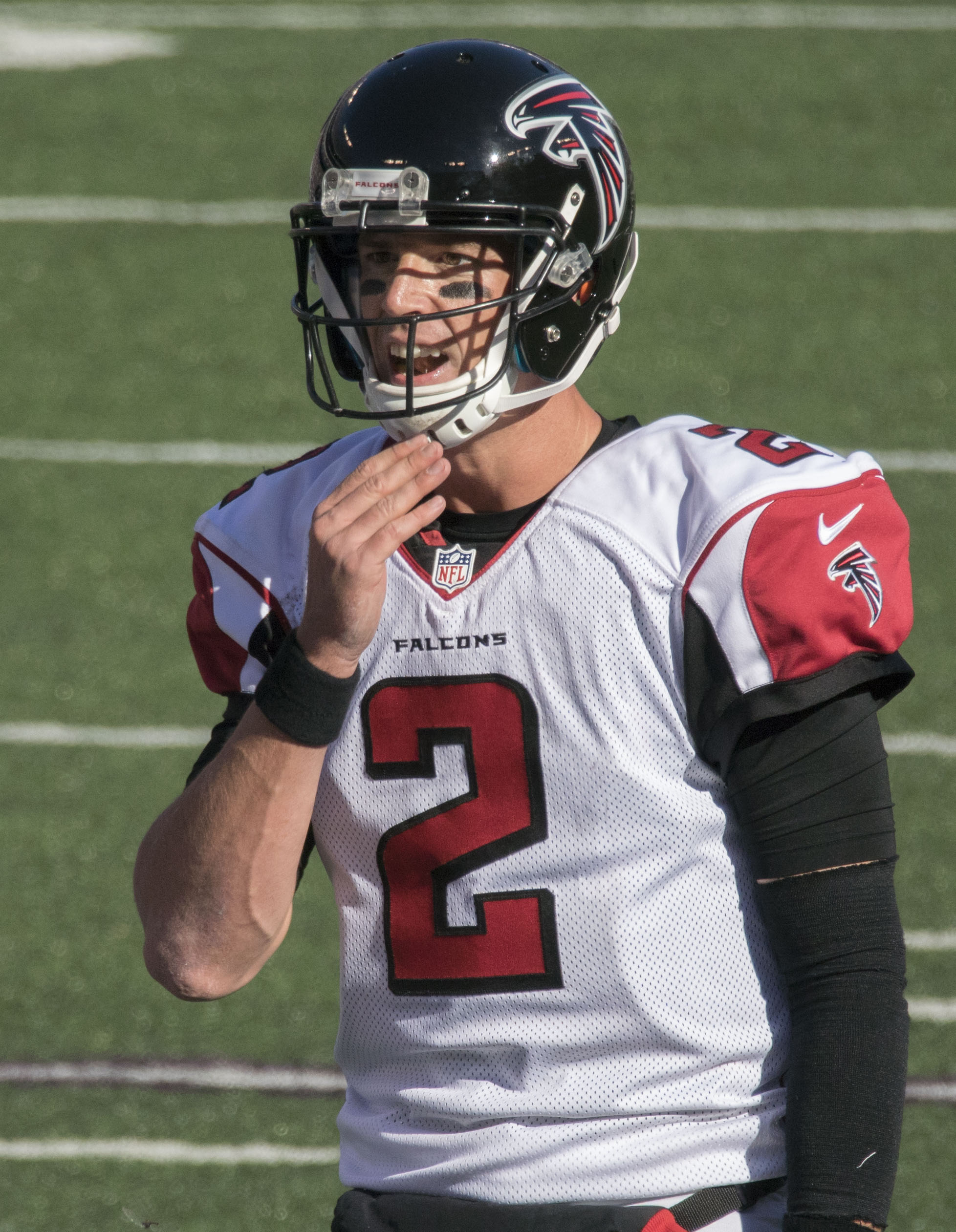
Matt Ryan holds the record for consecutive playoff games with at least three touchdown passes.

Bold denotes an active streak; minimum 3 consecutive post season games.

Rank	Quarterback	Period	Team	Consecutive games	Reference
1	Matt Ryan	January 13, 2013 – January 22, 2017	Atlanta Falcons	4	
2T	Bernie Kosar	September 1, 1988 – June 1, 1990	Cleveland Browns	3	
2T	Kurt Warner	January 18, 2009 – October 1, 2010	Arizona Cardinals	3	
2T	Aaron Rodgers	October 1, 2010 – January 15, 2011	Green Bay Packers	3	
2T	Joe Flacco	December 1, 2013 – March 2, 2013	Baltimore Ravens	3	
2T	Tom Brady	October 1, 2015 – January 2, 2015	New England Patriots	3	
2T	Patrick Mahomes	January 20, 2019 – January 19, 2020	Kansas City Chiefs	3	

==== All-time consecutive playoff games with at least four touchdown passes ====
Bold denotes an active streak; minimum 2 consecutive post season games.

Rank	Quarterback	Period	Team	Consecutive games	Reference
1	Ben Roethlisberger	January 14, 2018 – October 1, 2021	Pittsburgh Steelers	2	

=== Home playoff games ===
==== All-time consecutive home playoff games with at least one touchdown pass ====
Bold denotes an active streak; minimum 10 consecutive post season games.

Rank	Quarterback	Period	Team	Consecutive games	Reference
1	Peyton Manning	April 1, 2004 – November 1, 2015	Indianapolis Colts/Denver Broncos	13	
2T	John Elway	December 30, 1984 – January 17, 1999	Denver Broncos	11	
2T	Brett Favre	December 31, 1995 – January 17, 2010	Green Bay Packers/Minnesota Vikings	11	
4T	Dan Marino	December 31, 1983 – February 1, 1999	Miami Dolphins	10	
4T	Tom Brady	October 1, 2004 – January 14, 2012	New England Patriots	10	

==== All-time consecutive home playoff games with at least two touchdown passes ====
Bold denotes an active streak; minimum 5 consecutive post season games.

Rank	Quarterback	Period	Team	Consecutive games	Reference
1T	Tom Brady	July 1, 2006 – January 14, 2012	New England Patriots	7	
1T	Tom Brady	October 1, 2015 – January 21, 2018	New England Patriots	7	
3	Drew Brees	January 16, 2010 – January 20, 2019	New Orleans Saints	6	
4T	Terry Bradshaw	December 30, 1978 – September 1, 1983	Pittsburgh Steelers	5	
4T	Aaron Rodgers	November 1, 2015 – January 24, 2021	Green Bay Packers	5	

==== All-time consecutive home playoff games with at least three touchdown passes ====
Bold denotes an active streak; minimum 3 consecutive post season games.

Rank	Quarterback	Period	Team	Consecutive games	Reference
**1**	**Matt Ryan**	**January 13, 2013 – present**	**Atlanta Falcons**	**4**	
2T	Drew Brees	January 16, 2010 – July 1, 2012	New Orleans Saints	3	
2T	Patrick Mahomes	January 20, 2019 – January 19, 2020	Kansas City Chiefs	3	

==== All-time consecutive home playoff games with at least four touchdown passes ====
Bold denotes an active streak; minimum 2 consecutive post season games.

Rank	Quarterback	Period	Team	Consecutive games	Reference
1T	Daryle Lamonica	December 22, 1968 – December 21, 1969	Oakland Raiders	2	
1T	Peyton Manning	April 1, 2004 – September 1, 2005	Indianapolis Colts	2	
1T	Kurt Warner	January 18, 2009 – October 1, 2010	Arizona Cardinals	2	
1T	**Ben Roethlisberger**	**January 14, 2018 – present**	**Pittsburgh Steelers**	**2**	

==== All-time consecutive home playoff games with at least five touchdown passes ====
Bold denotes an active streak; minimum 2 consecutive post season games.

Rank	Quarterback	Period	Team	Consecutive games	Reference
1	Daryle Lamonica	December 22, 1968 – December 21, 1969	Oakland Raiders	2	

=== Road playoff games ===
==== All-time consecutive road playoff games with at least one touchdown pass ====
Bold denotes an active streak; minimum 10 consecutive post season games.

Rank	Quarterback	Period	Team	Consecutive games	Reference
1	Tom Brady	January 23, 2005 – January 24, 2021	New England Patriots/Tampa Bay Buccaneers	10	

==== All-time consecutive road playoff games with at least two touchdown passes ====
Bold denotes an active streak; minimum 5 consecutive post season games.

Rank	Quarterback	Period	Team	Consecutive games	Reference
**1T**	**Joe Flacco**	**January 22, 2012 – present**	**Baltimore Ravens**	**5**	
**1T**	**Aaron Rodgers**	**October 1, 2016 – present**	**Green Bay Packers**	**5**	

==== All-time consecutive road playoff games with at least three touchdown passes ====
Bold denotes an active streak; minimum 3 consecutive post season games.

Rank	Quarterback	Period	Team	Consecutive games	Reference
1	Aaron Rodgers	October 1, 2010 – January 15, 2011	Green Bay Packers	3	

== Combined regular season/post season ==
=== All-time consecutive combined uninterrupted games with at least one touchdown pass ===
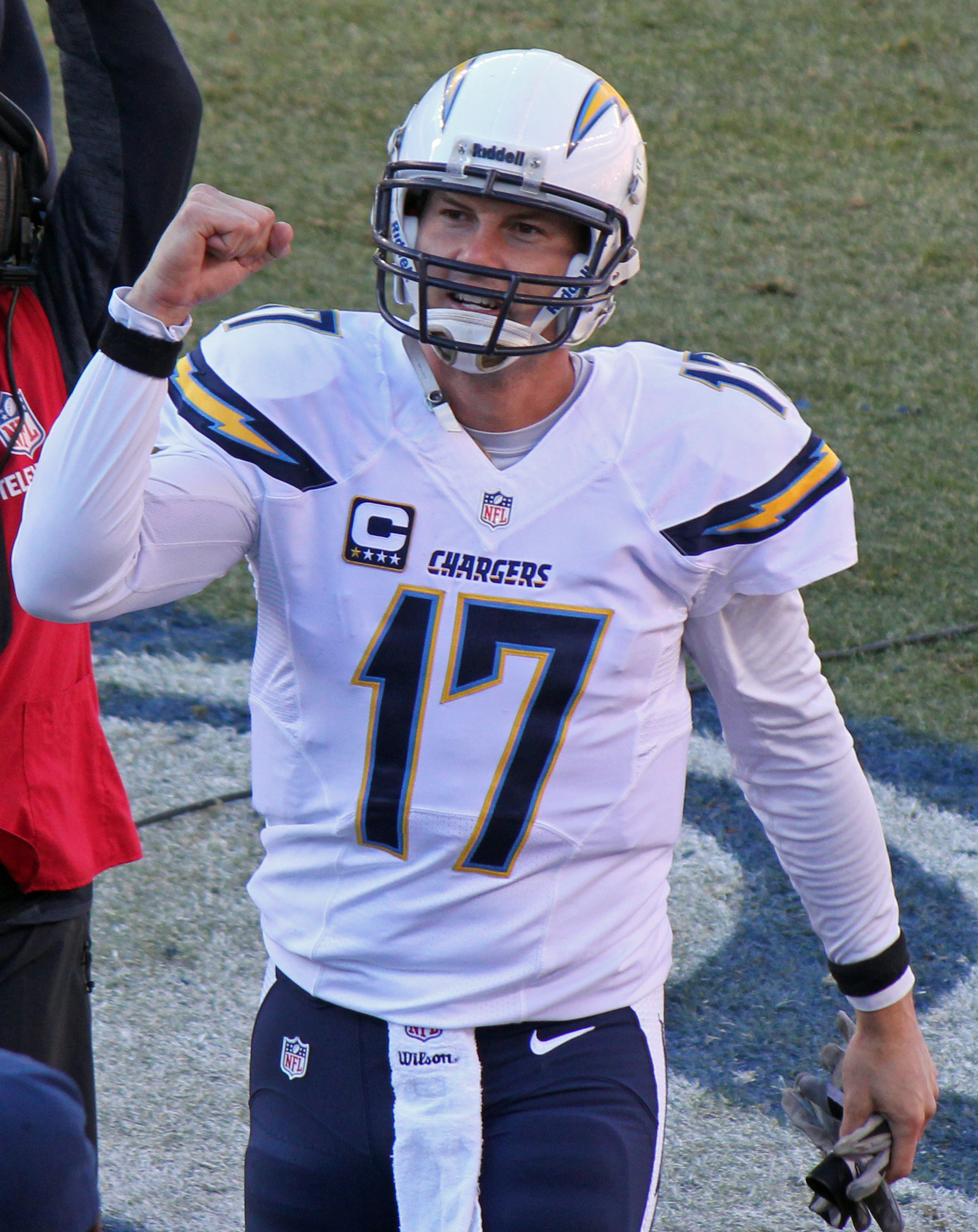
Philip Rivers is one of six players to have thrown 1+ touchdown passes in at least 30 consecutive games including playoffs in NFL history.

Drew Brees holds the record for consecutive uninterrupted games with a touchdown pass including playoffs with 49; the previous record of 39 was held by Brett Favre.

Bold denotes an active streak; minimum 30 consecutive combined regular plus playoff games.

Rank	Quarterback	Period	Team	Regular season	Post season	Combined	Reference
1	Drew Brees	January 16, 2010 – November 25, 2012	New Orleans Saints	43	6	49	
2	Peyton Manning	September 9, 2012 – November 30, 2014	Denver Broncos	44	4	48	
3	Drew Brees	September 12, 2012 – September 20, 2015	New Orleans Saints	38	2	40	
4	Brett Favre	October 20, 2002 – November 29, 2004	Green Bay Packers	36	3	39	
5	Tom Brady	October 1, 2010 – January 14, 2012	New England Patriots	32	3	35	
6	Matt Ryan	December 20, 2015 – 11/26/17	Atlanta Falcons	30	3	33	
7	Philip Rivers	September 12, 2012 – October 23, 2014	San Diego Chargers	28	2	30	

=== All-time consecutive combined uninterrupted games with at least two touchdown passes ===
Bold denotes an active streak; minimum 13 consecutive combined regular plus playoff games.

Rank	Quarterback	Period	Team	Regular season	Post season	Combined	Reference
1	Tom Brady	July 11, 2010 – February 10, 2011	New England Patriots	13	1	14	
2T	Peyton Manning	September 9, 2004 – December 12, 2004	Indianapolis Colts	13	0	13	
2T	Aaron Rodgers	August 9, 2011 – November 12, 2011	Green Bay Packers	13	0	13	
2T	Philip Rivers	December 31, 2017 – February 12, 2018	Los Angeles Chargers	13	0	13	

=== All-time consecutive combined uninterrupted games with at least three touchdown passes ===
Bold denotes an active streak; minimum 8 consecutive combined regular plus playoff games.

Rank	Quarterback	Period	Team	Regular season	Post season	Combined	Reference
1	Tom Brady	September 9, 2007 – November 18, 2007	New England Patriots	10	0	10	
2T	Peyton Manning	October 10, 2004 – May 12, 2004	Indianapolis Colts	8	0	8	
2T	Andrew Luck	September 30, 2018 – November 25, 2018	Indianapolis Colts	8	0	8	
2T	Joe Burrow	November 3, 2024 – December 28, 2024	Cincinnati Bengals	8	0	8	

=== All-time consecutive combined uninterrupted games with at least four touchdown passes ===
Bold denotes an active streak; minimum 4 consecutive combined regular plus playoff games.

Rank	Quarterback	Period	Team	Regular season	Post season	Combined	Reference
1	Peyton Manning	October 31, 2004 – November 25, 2004	Indianapolis Colts	5	0	5	
2	Dan Marino	November 26, 1984 – December 17, 1984	Miami Dolphins	4	0	4	

=== All-time consecutive combined uninterrupted games with at least five touchdown passes ===
Bold denotes an active streak; minimum 2 consecutive combined regular plus playoff games.

Rank	Quarterback	Period	Team	Regular season	Post season	Combined	Reference
1T	Daunte Culpepper	October 10, 2004 – October 17, 2004	Minnesota Vikings	2	0	2	
1T	Tom Brady	October 14, 2007 – October 21, 2007	New England Patriots	2	0	2	
1T	Ben Roethlisberger	October 26, 2014 – February 11, 2014	Pittsburgh Steelers	2	0	2	
1T	Russell Wilson	September 20, 2020 – September 27, 2020	Seattle Seahawks	2	0	2	

=== All-time consecutive combined uninterrupted games with at least six touchdown passes ===
Bold denotes an active streak; minimum 2 consecutive combined regular plus playoff games.

Rank	Quarterback	Period	Team	Regular season	Post season	Combined	Reference
1	Ben Roethlisberger	October 26, 2014 – February 11, 2014	Pittsburgh Steelers	2	0	2	

== See also ==
- List of National Football League records (individual)#Passing touchdowns
- List of most consecutive starts and games played by National Football League players
- List of most consecutive starts by a National Football League quarterback
- List of most wins by a National Football League starting quarterback
