= Hastings Street =

Hastings Street may refer to:

- Hastings Street (Vancouver), an east–west traffic corridor in Vancouver and Burnaby, British Columbia, Canada
- Hastings Street (Detroit), the former center of Detroit's African-American community, removed for the Chrysler Freeway
- the main street of Noosa Heads on the Sunshine Coast, Queensland
- Hastings Street (album), an album by Brazzaville
