= List of most sacked NFL quarterbacks =

List of the 10 most sacked quarterbacks

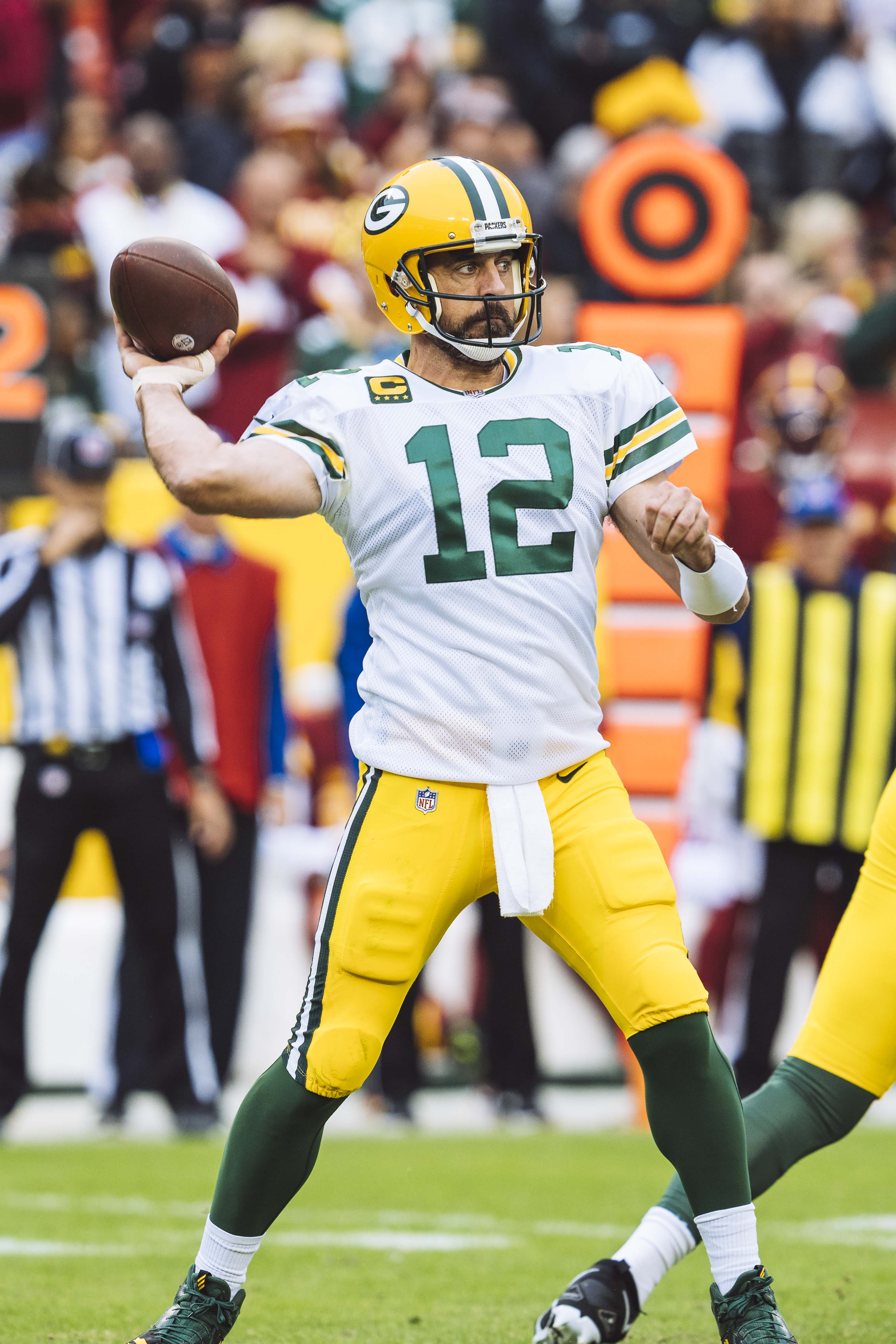
Aaron Rodgers has been sacked the most of any NFL player.

This is a list of the most sacked quarterbacks in National Football League (NFL) history. Through the 2025 season, Aaron Rodgers is the league's most sacked quarterback, being sacked 626 times during his career in the regular season, while Tom Brady is the league's most sacked playoff quarterback being sacked 81 times. Current stats are updated from Pro Football Reference (PFR) all-time sack leaders rate. This list contains Quarterbacks who have been sacked at least 400 times in their regular season career and 30 times in their playoff career.

== Regular season career quarterback sack leaders ==
Currently Playing
Retired

Rank	Name	Sacks	Teams
1	Aaron Rodgers	626	Green Bay Packers (2005–2022); New York Jets (2023–2024); Pittsburgh Steelers (2025–present)
2	Fran Tarkenton	570	Minnesota Vikings (1961–1966, 1972–1978); New York Giants (1967–1971)
3	Russell Wilson	570	Seattle Seahawks (2012–2021); Denver Broncos (2022–2023); Pittsburgh Steelers (2024); New York Giants (2025)
4	Tom Brady	565	New England Patriots (2000–2019); Tampa Bay Buccaneers (2020–2022)
5	Ben Roethlisberger	554	Pittsburgh Steelers (2004-2021)
6	Matthew Stafford	540	Detroit Lions (2009-2020); Los Angeles Rams (2021–present)
7	Brett Favre	525	Atlanta Falcons (1991); Green Bay Packers (1992-2007); New York Jets (2008); Minnesota Vikings (2009-2010)
8	John Elway	516	Denver Broncos (1983-1998)
9	Dave Krieg	494	Seattle Seahawks (1980-1991); Kansas City Chiefs (1992-1993); Detroit Lions (1994); Arizona Cardinals (1995); Chicago Bears (1996); Tennessee Oilers (1997-1998)
10	Matt Ryan	488	Atlanta Falcons (2008–2021); Indianapolis Colts (2022)
11	Randall Cunningham	484	Philadelphia Eagles (1985–1995); Minnesota Vikings(1997–1999); Dallas Cowboys (2000); Baltimore Ravens (2001)
12	Phil Simms	477	New York Giants (1979-1993)
13	Drew Bledsoe	467	New England Patriots (1993–2001); Buffalo Bills (2002–2004); Dallas Cowboys (2005–2006)
14	Philip Rivers	469	San Diego/Los Angeles Chargers (2004–2019); Indianapolis Colts (2020); Indianapolis Colts (2025)
15	Warren Moon	458	Houston Oilers (1984)–1993); Minnesota Vikings (1994)–1996); Seattle Seahawks (1997-1998); Kansas City Chiefs 1999)-(2000)
16	Alex Smith	432	San Francisco 49ers (2005–2012); Kansas City Chiefs (2013–2017); Washington Redskins/Football Team (2018–2020)
17	Joe Flacco	422	Baltimore Ravens (2008–2018); Denver Broncos (2019); New York Jets (2020, 2021-2022); Cleveland Browns (2023, 2025); Indianapolis Colts (2024); Cincinnati Bengals (2025–present)
18	Drew Brees	420	San Diego Chargers (2001–2005); New Orleans Saints (2006–2020)
19	Vinny Testaverde	417	Tampa Bay Buccaneers (1987-1992); Cleveland Browns (1993-1995); Baltimore Ravens (1993-1995); New York Jets (1993-2003, 2005; Dallas Cowboys (2004); New England Patriots (2006); Carolina Panthers (2007)
20	Ryan Tannehill	415	Miami Dolphins (2012–2018); Tennessee Titans (2019–2023)
21	Eli Manning	411	New York Giants (2004–2019)
22	Donovan McNabb	410	Philadelphia Eagles (1999-2009); Washington Redskins (2010); Minnesota Vikings (2011)
23	Craig Morton	405	Dallas Cowboys (1965-1973); New York Giants (1974-1976); Denver Broncos (1977-1982)

== Playoff leaders ==
Currently Playing
Retired

Rank	Name	Sacks	Teams
1	Tom Brady	81	New England Patriots (2000–2019); Tampa Bay Buccaneers (2020–2022)
2	Roger Staubach	61	Dallas Cowboys (1969–1979)
3	Aaron Rodgers	58	Green Bay Packers (2005–2022); New York Jets (2023–2024); Pittsburgh Steelers (2025–present)
4	Ben Roethlisberger	53	Pittsburgh Steelers (2004-2021)
5	Russell Wilson	53	Seattle Seahawks (2012–2021); Denver Broncos (2022–2023); Pittsburgh Steelers (2024); New York Giants (2025)
6	Donovan McNabb	48	Philadelphia Eagles (1999-2009); Washington Redskins (2010); Minnesota Vikings (2011)
7	Patrick Mahomes	46	Kansas City Chiefs (2017–present)
8	Joe Montana	45	San Francisco 49ers (1979-1992); Kansas City Chiefs (1992-1993)
9	Peyton Manning	40	Indianapolis Colts (1998-2011); Denver Broncos (2012-2015)
10	John Elway	39	Denver Broncos (1983-1998)
11	Brett Favre	36	Atlanta Falcons (1991); Green Bay Packers (1992-2007); New York Jets (2008); Minnesota Vikings (2009-2010)
12	Troy Aikman	34	Dallas Cowboys (1989–2000)
13	Josh Allen	32	Buffalo Bills (2018–present)
14	Joe Flacco	32	Baltimore Ravens (2008–2018); Denver Broncos (2019); New York Jets (2020, 2021-2022); Cleveland Browns (2023, 2025); Indianapolis Colts (2024); Cincinnati Bengals (2025–present)
15	Phil Simms	30	New York Giants (1979–1993)

== See also ==
- List of National Football League annual sacks leaders
- List of National Football League career sacks leaders
