= Hastings (1785 ship) =

India-built British ship 1785–1823

History

United Kingdom
- Name: Hastings
- Namesake: Warren Hastings
- Operator: Bengal Pilot Service
- Builder: Bombay Dockyard, India
- Launched: 1785 or 1787,
- Fate: Sold 1818

United Kingdom
- Name: Hastings
- Acquired: 1818 by purchase
- Fate: Burnt 1823

General characteristics
- Tons burthen: 170 (bm)
- Sail plan: Brig

Hastings was a brig that the Bombay Dockyard launched in 1785 or 1787 for the Bengal Pilot Service. In 1818, the EIC sold her to local buyers. Alternatively, in May 1818 she was converted to a buoy vessel; in 1819 she appeared as a buoy vessel on a list of pilot vessels at Calcutta with J.F. Twisden, master. She was sold on 11 October 1820. A fire destroyed her on the night of 17 April 1823, while she was at Pulau Pasang, off Padang.
