= Norm Willey =

American football player (1927–2011)

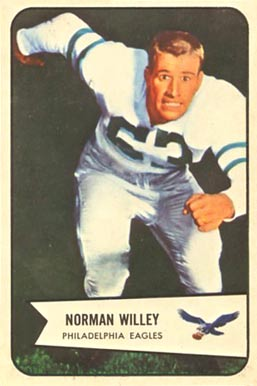
- Willey on a 1954 Bowman football card

No. 44, 63, 86
- Positions: Defensive end, end, guard

Personal information
- Born: August 22, 1927; Hastings, West Virginia, U.S.
- Died: August 18, 2011 (aged 83); Newark, Delaware, U.S.
- Listed height: 6 ft 2 in (1.88 m)
- Listed weight: 224 lb (102 kg)

Career information
- College: Marshall
- NFL draft: 1950: 13th round, 170th overall pick

Career history
- Philadelphia Eagles (1950–1957)

Awards and highlights
- First-team All-Pro (1954); 2× Pro Bowl (1954, 1955)

Career NFL statistics
- Games played: 92
- Games started: 70
- Fumble recoveries: 9
- Interceptions: 2
- Stats at Pro Football Reference

Norman Earle Willey (August 22, 1927 – August 18, 2011) was an American professional football defensive lineman in the National Football League (NFL) for the Philadelphia Eagles. He went to two Pro Bowls during his eight-year career and was credited with an unofficial 17 sacks in one game which would be an NFL record today.

== Professional career ==
Willey played college football at Marshall University and was selected 170th overall in the thirteenth round of the 1950 NFL draft. Willey was drafted as a fullback, however, he was moved to defensive end by Eagles coach Greasy Neale.

In a 1952 game against the New York Giants, Willey was reported to have sacked Giants quarterback Charlie Conerly 17 times. However, this number has been disputed, with Paul Zimmerman crediting Willey with only eight sacks, which would still be an NFL record.

In 1954, Willey was part of an Eagles defensive line that was dubbed the "Suicide Seven". That season, Willey was named a first team All-Pro, and made the Pro Bowl for the first time. Willey also made the Pro Bowl during the 1955 season.

Willey broke his leg during the 1956 season, and never fully recovered as a player. He retired following the 1957 season.

== Post-career life ==
Willey went on after his NFL career to teach physical education and coach football at Pennsville Memorial High School in Pennsville Township, New Jersey; the Norm Willey Boot trophy is awarded annually to the winner of annual football game between Pennsville and Penns Grove High School.

In 2003, Willey was elected into the Marshall University Athletics Hall of Fame for his career in football and basketball.

Wiley died on August 18, 2011, aged 83, only four days short of his 84th birthday.

In remembrance of Willey, the Pennsville Memorial High School football team represented his initials on each of their helmets during the 2011 season.
