= Warren Hastings (East Indiaman) =

Three ships with the name Warren Hastings, named for Warren Hastings, served the Honourable East India Company (EIC) as East Indiamen between 1781 and 1834:

- Warren Hastings (1781 EIC ship), was launched in 1781. She made six voyages for the EIC before being sold in 1797 for breaking up.
- Warren Hastings (1802 EIC ship) was launched in 1802. She made one complete voyage for the EIC before the French captured her in 1805. They sold her to Danish interests in December 1806. The British seized her in January 1808, after which her former owners repurchased her. She then made another six voyages for the East India company on charter until her owners sold her in 1829 for breaking up.

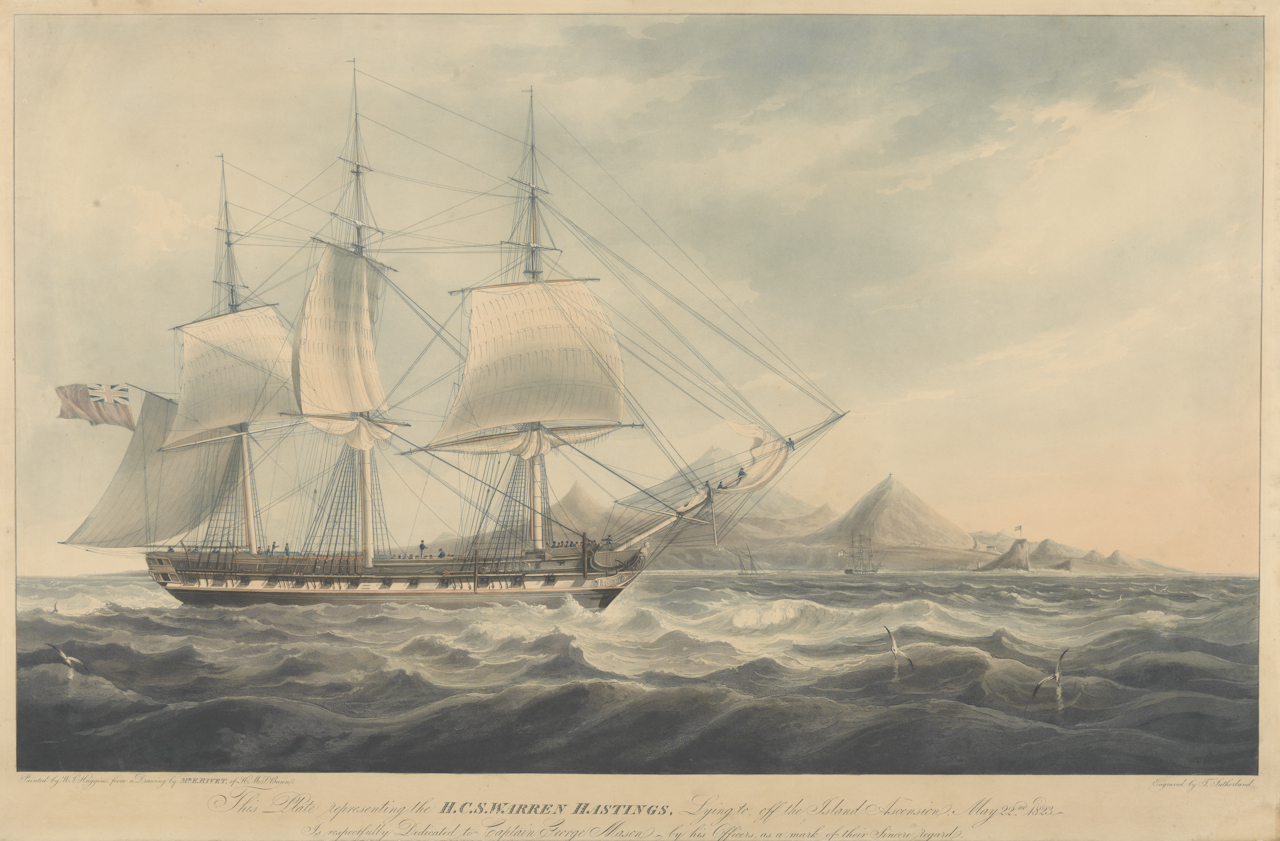
Warren Hastings (1808), - lying to off the Island Ascension, 22 May 1823 - dedicated to Captain George Mason by his Officers

- Warren Hastings (1808 EIC ship), a ship of 106438/94 tons burthen launched in 1808 at London, made ten voyages for the company before her owners sold her in 1834 for breaking up.

NOTE: The British Library has data on five vessels named Warren Hastings, but the data for Warren Hastings nos. 2, 4, and 5 all pertain to the same vessel, the Warren Hastings launched in 1802.
