= List of NFL Pro Bowl records =

This is a list of the NFL Pro Bowl records. As of the 2022 Pro Bowl. Most of these records can not be broken since the NFL changed the Pro Bowl to the Pro Bowl Games in 2023 and eliminated the Pro Bowl as an event in 2026.

== Individual ==
=== Service ===
Games Selected—15, Tom Brady (Patriots/Buccaneers)

Youngest to start—22 years 2 months and 5 days, JuJu Smith-Schuster (Steelers)

=== Scoring ===
Points, Career—57 David Akers, Philadelphia, 2002–03, 2005, 2010–11, San Francisco 2012 (24-PATs, 11-FGs)

Points, Game—24, Brandon Marshall, Miami, 2012, 4 TDs.

Touchdowns, Career—8, Larry Fitzgerald, Arizona, 2006, 2008–09, 2011-13.

Touchdowns, Game—4, Brandon Marshall, Miami, 2012.

PATs, Career—24, David Akers, Philadelphia, 2002–03, 2005, 2010–11, San Francisco 2012.

PATs, Game—8, Sebastian Janikowski, Oakland, 2012; Blair Walsh, Minnesota, 2013.

Field Goals Attempted, Career—18, Morten Andersen, New Orleans 1986-89, 1991, 1993; Atlanta 1996.

Field Goals, Career—11, David Akers, Philadelphia, 2002–03, 2005, 2010–11, San Francisco 2012.

Field Goals Attempted, Game—6, Jan Stenerud, Kansas City, 1972 (4 made); Eddie Murray, Detroit, 1981 (4 made); Mark Moseley, Washington, 1983 (2 made).

Field Goals, Game—5, Garo Yepremian, Miami, 1974.

Longest Field Goal—53, David Akers, Philadelphia, 2003.

Safeties, Game—1, Art Still, Kansas City, 1983; Mark Gastineau, N.Y. Jets, 1985; Greg Townsend, L.A. Raiders, 1992.

Fewest Regular Season Touchdowns to make the Pro Bowl-2, Tyler Huntley 2022.

=== Rushing ===
Attempts, Career—81, Walter Payton, Chicago 1977-81, 1984-87.

Attempts, Game—19, O.J. Simpson, Buffalo, 1974.

Yards Gained, Career—368, Walter Payton, Chicago 1977-81, 1984-87.

Yards Gained, Game—180, Marshall Faulk, Indianapolis, 1995.

Touchdowns, Career—4, Adrian Peterson, Minnesota, 2008-11.

Touchdowns, Game—3, Mike Alstott, Tampa Bay, 2000.

Longest Run From Scrimmage—49 yards (TD), Marshall Faulk, Indianapolis, 1995.

=== Passing ===
Attempts, Career—196, Peyton Manning, Indianapolis 2000-01, 2003–09, 2011; Denver 2013.

Attempts, Game—41, Peyton Manning, Indianapolis, 2004.

Completions, Career—115, Peyton Manning, Indianapolis 2000-01, 2003–09, 2011; Denver 2013.

Completions, Game—22, Peyton Manning, Indianapolis, 2004.

Yards Gained, Career—1,551, Peyton Manning, Indianapolis 2000-01, 2003–09, 2011; Denver 2013.

Yards Gained, Game—342, Peyton Manning, Indianapolis, 2004.

Longest Completion—93 yards, Jeff Blake, Cincinnati (to Yancey Thigpen, Pittsburgh), 1996 (TD).

Touchdown Passes, Career—15, Peyton Manning, Indianapolis 2000-01, 2003–09, 2011; Denver 2013.

Touchdown Passes, Game—4, Marc Bulger, St. Louis, 2004.

Interceptions Thrown, Career—9, Peyton Manning, Indianapolis 2000-01, 2003–09, 2011; Denver 2013.

Interceptions Thrown, Game—5, Jim Hart, St. Louis, 1977.

=== Receiving ===
Receptions, Career—49, Tony Gonzalez, Kansas City, 2000–01, 2003–09, Atlanta, 2011-12.

Receptions, Game—10, Victor Cruz, N.Y. Giants, 2013.

Yards Gained, Career—746, Tony Gonzalez, Kansas City, 2000–01, 2003–09, Atlanta, 2011-12.

Yards Gained, Game—212, Randy Moss, Minnesota, 2000.

Longest Reception—93 yards, Yancey Thigpen, Pittsburgh, from Jeff Blake, Cincinnati,, 1996.

Touchdowns, Career—8, Larry Fitzgerald, Arizona, 2006, 2008–09, 2011-13.

Touchdowns, Game—4, Brandon Marshall, Miami, 2012.

=== Interceptions ===
Interceptions, Career—4, Everson Walls, Dallas 1982-84, 1986; Deion Sanders, Atlanta 1992-94; San Francisco 1995; Dallas 1999; Champ Bailey, Washington 2001-04; Denver, 2005–08, 2011-13.

Interceptions, Game—2, Mel Blount, Pittsburgh, 1977; Everson Walls, Dallas, 1982 and 1983; LeRoy Irvin, L.A. Rams, 1986; David Fulcher, Cincinnati, 1990; Brian Dawkins, Philadelphia, 2000; Rod Woodson, Oakland, 2003; Ed Reed, Baltimore, 2007; Antonio Cromartie, San Diego, 2008; Eric Weddle, San Diego, 2012.

Touchdown Returns, Career—2, Ty Law, New England 1999, 2002–04, N.Y. Jets, 2006; Derrick Brooks, Tampa Bay, 1998-2001, 2003, 2006.

Touchdown Return, Game—1, by 18 players.

Longest Return—87 yards, Deion Sanders, Dallas, 1999.

== Team ==
=== Selections ===
Most Selections in a season—13, Dallas Cowboys in 2007

=== Scoring ===
Most Points—76, NFC, 2025.

Fewest Points—3, AFC, 1984, 1989, 1994.

Most Points, Both Teams—139, NFC 76, AFC 63, 2025.

Fewest Points, Both Teams—16, AFC 10, NFC 6, 1987.

Touchdowns, One Team—8, AFC, 2012; NFC, 2013.

Fewest Touchdowns—0, AFC, 1971, 1974, 1984, 1989, 1994; NFC, 1987, 1988.

Touchdowns, Both Teams—14, NFC 7, AFC 7, 2004), AFC 8, NFC 6, 2012.

Fewest Touchdowns, Both Teams—1, NFC 1, AFC 0, 1974; AFC 1, NFC 0, 1987; AFC 1, NFC 0, 1988.

Field Goals—5, AFC, 1974.

Field Goals, Both Teams—7, AFC 5, NFC 2, 1974.

== Coaching ==
Most Games Coached—6 Andy Reid

Most Games Won—4 Bill Cowher
