= Hastings, West Virginia =

Hastings
- Unincorporated community
- Location within the state of West Virginia Hastings (the United States)
- Coordinates: 39°33′04″N 80°40′24″W
- Country: United States
- State: West Virginia
- County: Wetzel
- Time zone: UTC-5 (Eastern (EST))
  - Summer (DST): UTC-4 (EDT)

Hastings is an unincorporated community in Wetzel County, West Virginia, United States. It lies at an elevation of 755 feet (230 m).

== History ==
Hastings was established as a company town by the Hope Natural Gas Company in the early part of the 20th century. With a population of several hundred people who lived in as many as fifty company houses, the community also had a church, a school, a company store, an athletic field, a post office, and a community hall. The community had indoor athletic facilities for basketball, table tennis and billiards, and it also served as a theater. A hotel in the community was used by company employees who traveled to the site to perform maintenance and other tasks. Hastings was named for Dennis Hastings, the first superintendent of the original natural gas processing plant on site. It was a thriving community into the late 1960s when they baby boomers began to graduate from high school and their parents and grandparents began retiring and moving away. Nowadays it is a virtual ghost town with only two company houses remaining.

During the 1920s and 1930s the company fielded a baseball team that travelled around the Ohio Valley and also played home games in Hastings. Entertainment being at a premium, the Sunday afternoon games were attended by hundreds of people as the field was located adjacent to the railroad tracks. Future major leaguer Floyd Giebell pitched here prior to becoming a Detroit Tiger in the late 1930s.

Former residents of Hastings returned to the area for reunions well into the 1980s after which time they became too few and too elderly to maintain the tradition.

After undergoing a long series of name changes, from Hope Natural Gas Company to Consolidated Gas Supply Corporation and finally to CNG, the company was acquired by Dominion Resources of Virginia in 2000. Dominion continues to operate a natural gas processing site and a group of loading stations at Hastings and at Galmish three miles downstream. Dominion would go on to sell both facilities in 2020 to Berkshire Hathaway Energy forming a sub entity Eastern Gas Transmission & Storage.

== Climate ==
The climate in this area is characterized by relatively high temperatures and evenly distributed precipitation throughout the year. According to the Köppen Climate Classification system, Hastings has a Humid subtropical climate, abbreviated "Cfa" on climate maps.

== Notable people ==
- Norm Willey, former NFL Pro Bowl defensive end for the Philadelphia Eagles from 1950 to 1957
