= List of NFL career quarterback wins leaders =

The following is a list of the top National Football League (NFL) quarterbacks in regular season wins since quarterback starts were first officially tracked in 1950. In the NFL, the starting quarterback is the only position that is credited with wins and losses.

Tom Brady holds the record for the most regular season and postseason wins, with 251 and 35 respectively.

Aaron Rodgers leads active players with 169 regular season wins. Patrick Mahomes leads active players with 17 postseason wins.

Otto Graham holds the record for the highest winning percentage with a minimum of 50 starts at .814 (57–13–1).

== Regular season wins ==
This sortable table shows the top 100 NFL quarterbacks in order of regular season wins, since the start of the modern era, 1950. The table also shows every team that a quarterback played for and his record with each team.

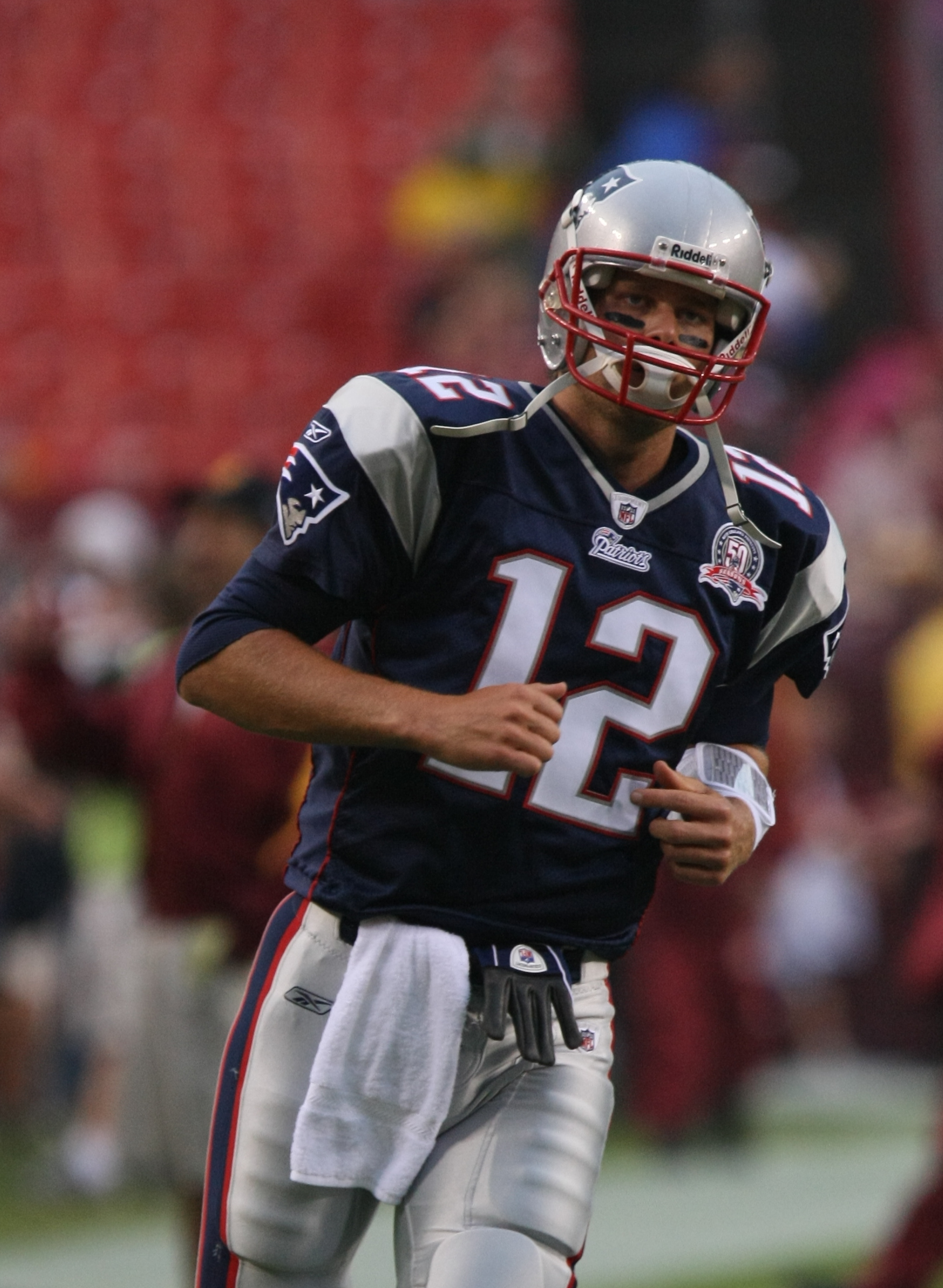
Tom Brady is the all-time leader in wins at quarterback.

Key
^ Inducted into the Pro Football Hall of Fame
‡ Retired but not yet eligible for the Hall of Fame
* Active player
Player with most wins for team

Rank	Quarterback	Career wins	Career losses	Career ties	Career win % ^{a}	Team(s)	Seasons	W	L	T
1	‡ Tom Brady	251	82	0	.754	New England Patriots	2000–2019	219	64	0
1	‡ Tom Brady	251	82	0	.754	Tampa Bay Buccaneers	2020–2022	32	18	0
2	^ Brett Favre	186	112	0	.624	Atlanta Falcons	1991	0	0	0
2	^ Brett Favre	186	112	0	.624	Green Bay Packers	1992–2007	160	93	0
2	^ Brett Favre	186	112	0	.624	New York Jets	2008	9	7	0
2	^ Brett Favre	186	112	0	.624	Minnesota Vikings	2009–2010	17	12	0
2	^ Peyton Manning	186	79	0	.702	Indianapolis Colts	1998–2011	141	67	0
2	^ Peyton Manning	186	79	0	.702	Denver Broncos	2012–2015	45	12	0
4	^ Drew Brees	172	114	0	.601	San Diego Chargers	2001–2005	30	28	0
4	^ Drew Brees	172	114	0	.601	New Orleans Saints	2006–2020	142	86	0
5	* Aaron Rodgers	169	96	1	.637	Green Bay Packers	2005–2022	147	75	1
5	* Aaron Rodgers	169	96	1	.637	New York Jets	2023–2024	6	12	0
5	* Aaron Rodgers	169	96	1	.637	Pittsburgh Steelers	2025–present	16	9	0
6	‡ Ben Roethlisberger	165	81	1	.670	Pittsburgh Steelers	2004–2021	165	81	1
7	^ John Elway	148	82	1	.643	Denver Broncos	1983–1998	148	82	1
8	^ Dan Marino	147	93	0	.613	Miami Dolphins	1983–1999	147	93	0
9	‡ Philip Rivers	134	109	0	.551	SD/LA Chargers	2004–2019	123	101	0
9	‡ Philip Rivers	134	109	0	.551	Indianapolis Colts	2020, 2025	11	8	0
10	* Matthew Stafford	126	122	1	.508	Detroit Lions	2009–2020	74	90	1
10	* Matthew Stafford	126	122	1	.508	Los Angeles Rams	2021–present	52	32	0
11	‡Matt Ryan	124	109	1	.532	Atlanta Falcons	2008–2021	120	102	0
11	‡Matt Ryan	124	109	1	.532	Indianapolis Colts	2022	4	7	1
11	^ Fran Tarkenton	124	109	6	.532	Minnesota Vikings	1961–1966, 1972–1978	91	73	6
11	^ Fran Tarkenton	124	109	6	.532	New York Giants	1967–1971	33	36	0
13	‡ Russell Wilson	121	80	1	.601	Seattle Seahawks	2012–2021	104	53	1
13	‡ Russell Wilson	121	80	1	.601	Denver Broncos	2022–2023	11	19	0
13	‡ Russell Wilson	121	80	1	.601	Pittsburgh Steelers	2024	6	5	0
13	‡ Russell Wilson	121	80	1	.601	New York Giants	2025	0	3	0
14	^ Johnny Unitas	118	63	4	.652	Baltimore Colts	1956–1972	117	60	4
14	^ Johnny Unitas	118	63	4	.652	San Diego Chargers	1973	1	3	0
15	Eli Manning	117	117	0	.500	New York Giants	2004–2019	117	117	0
15	^ Joe Montana	117	47	0	.713	San Francisco 49ers	1979–1992	100	39	0
15	^ Joe Montana	117	47	0	.713	Kansas City Chiefs	1993–1994	17	8	0
17	^ Terry Bradshaw	107	51	0	.677	Pittsburgh Steelers	1970–1983	107	51	0
17	* Joe Flacco	107	94	0	.532	Baltimore Ravens	2008–2018	96	67	0
17	* Joe Flacco	107	94	0	.532	Denver Broncos	2019	2	6	0
17	* Joe Flacco	107	94	0	.532	New York Jets	2020, 2021–2022	1	8	0
17	* Joe Flacco	107	94	0	.532	Philadelphia Eagles	2021	0	0	0
17	* Joe Flacco	107	94	0	.532	Cleveland Browns	2023, 2025	5	4	0
17	* Joe Flacco	107	94	0	.532	Indianapolis Colts	2024	2	4	0
17	* Joe Flacco	107	94	0	.532	Cincinnati Bengals	2025–present	1	5	0
19	* Patrick Mahomes	102	33	0	.756	Kansas City Chiefs	2017–present	102	33	0
19	^ Warren Moon	102	101	0	.502	Houston Oilers	1984–1993	70	69	0
19	^ Warren Moon	102	101	0	.502	Minnesota Vikings	1994–1996	21	18	0
19	^ Warren Moon	102	101	0	.502	Seattle Seahawks	1997–1998	11	13	0
19	^ Warren Moon	102	101	0	.502	Kansas City Chiefs	1999–2000	0	1	0
21	^ Jim Kelly	101	59	0	.631	Buffalo Bills	1986–1996	101	59	0
22	Alex Smith	99	67	1	.596	San Francisco 49ers	2005–2012	38	36	1
22	Alex Smith	99	67	1	.596	Kansas City Chiefs	2013–2017	50	26	0
22	Alex Smith	99	67	1	.596	Washington Redskins / Football Team	2018–2020	11	5	0
23	Drew Bledsoe	98	95	0	.508	New England Patriots	1993–2001	63	60	0
23	Drew Bledsoe	98	95	0	.508	Buffalo Bills	2002–2004	23	25	0
23	Drew Bledsoe	98	95	0	.508	Dallas Cowboys	2005–2006	12	10	0
23	Dave Krieg	98	77	0	.560	Seattle Seahawks	1980–1991	70	49	0
23	Dave Krieg	98	77	0	.560	Kansas City Chiefs	1992–1993	13	8	0
23	Dave Krieg	98	77	0	.560	Detroit Lions	1994	5	2	0
23	Dave Krieg	98	77	0	.560	Arizona Cardinals	1995	4	12	0
23	Dave Krieg	98	77	0	.560	Chicago Bears	1996	6	6	0
23	Dave Krieg	98	77	0	.560	Tennessee Oilers	1997–1998	0	0	0
23	Donovan McNabb	98	62	1	.612	Philadelphia Eagles	1999–2009	92	49	1
23	Donovan McNabb	98	62	1	.612	Washington Redskins	2010	5	8	0
23	Donovan McNabb	98	62	1	.612	Minnesota Vikings	2011	1	5	0
26	* Jared Goff	97	62	1	.609	Los Angeles Rams	2016–2020	42	27	0
26	* Jared Goff	97	62	1	.609	Detroit Lions	2021–present	55	35	1
27	* Josh Allen	96	40	0	.706	Buffalo Bills	2018–present	96	40	0
27	^ Ken Stabler	96	49	1	.661	Oakland Raiders	1970–1979	69	26	1
27	^ Ken Stabler	96	49	1	.661	Houston Oilers	1980–1981	16	12	0
27	^ Ken Stabler	96	49	1	.661	New Orleans Saints	1982–1984	11	11	0
29	Phil Simms	95	64	0	.597	New York Giants	1979–1993	95	64	0
30	^ Troy Aikman	94	71	0	.570	Dallas Cowboys	1989–2000	94	71	0
30	^ Len Dawson	94	57	8	.622	Pittsburgh Steelers	1957–1959	0	1	0
30	^ Len Dawson	94	57	8	.622	Cleveland Browns	1960–1961	1	0	0
30	^ Len Dawson	94	57	8	.622	Dallas Texans/Kansas City Chiefs	1962–1975	93	56	8
30	^ Bart Starr	94	57	6	.623	Green Bay Packers	1956–1971	94	57	6
30	^ Steve Young	94	49	0	.657	Tampa Bay Buccaneers	1985–1986	3	16	0
30	^ Steve Young	94	49	0	.657	San Francisco 49ers	1987–1999	91	33	0
34	* Kirk Cousins	93	82	2	.531	Washington Redskins	2012–2017	26	30	1
34	* Kirk Cousins	93	82	2	.531	Minnesota Vikings	2018–2023; 2026–Present	51	37	1
34	* Kirk Cousins	93	82	2	.531	Atlanta Falcons	2024–2025	12	10	0
34	* Kirk Cousins	93	82	2	.531	Las Vegas Raiders	2026	4	5	0
35	^ Bob Griese	92	56	3	.619	Miami Dolphins	1967–1980	92	56	3
35	Carson Palmer	92	88	1	.511	Cincinnati Bengals	2003–2010	46	51	1
35	Carson Palmer	92	88	1	.511	Oakland Raiders	2011–2012	8	16	0
35	Carson Palmer	92	88	1	.511	Arizona Cardinals	2013–2017	38	21	0
37	Ken Anderson	91	81	0	.529	Cincinnati Bengals	1971–1986	91	81	0
37	Steve McNair	91	62	0	.595	Houston Oilers/Tenn. Oilers/Titans	1995–2005	76	55	0
37	Steve McNair	91	62	0	.595	Baltimore Ravens	2006–2007	15	7	0
39	Vinny Testaverde	90	123	1	.423	Tampa Bay Buccaneers	1987–1992	24	48	0
39	Vinny Testaverde	90	123	1	.423	Cleveland Browns	1993–1995	16	15	0
39	Vinny Testaverde	90	123	1	.423	Baltimore Ravens	1996–1997	8	20	1
39	Vinny Testaverde	90	123	1	.423	New York Jets	1998–2003, 2005	35	26	0
39	Vinny Testaverde	90	123	1	.423	Dallas Cowboys	2004	5	10	0
39	Vinny Testaverde	90	123	1	.423	New England Patriots	2006	0	0	0
39	Vinny Testaverde	90	123	1	.423	Carolina Panthers	2007	2	4	0
40	Jim Hart	87	88	5	.497	St. Louis Cardinals	1966–1983	87	88	5
40	Jim Hart	87	88	5	.497	Washington Redskins	1984	0	0	0
40	* Dak Prescott	87	61	1	.587	Dallas Cowboys	2016–present	87	61	1
42	^ Dan Fouts	86	84	1	.506	San Diego Chargers	1973–1987	86	84	1
42	Roman Gabriel	86	64	7	.573	Los Angeles Rams	1962–1972	74	39	6
42	Roman Gabriel	86	64	7	.573	Philadelphia Eagles	1973–1977	12	25	1
44	Matt Hasselbeck	85	75	0	.531	Green Bay Packers	1999–2000	0	0	0
44	Matt Hasselbeck	85	75	0	.531	Seattle Seahawks	2001–2010	69	62	0
44	Matt Hasselbeck	85	75	0	.531	Tennessee Titans	2011–2012	11	10	0
44	Matt Hasselbeck	85	75	0	.531	Indianapolis Colts	2013–2015	5	3	0
44	^ Roger Staubach	85	29	0	.746	Dallas Cowboys	1969–1979	85	29	0
46	* Andy Dalton	84	82	2	.506	Cincinnati Bengals	2011–2019	70	61	2
46	* Andy Dalton	84	82	2	.506	Dallas Cowboys	2020	4	5	0
46	* Andy Dalton	84	82	2	.506	Chicago Bears	2021	3	3	0
46	* Andy Dalton	84	82	2	.506	New Orleans Saints	2022	6	8	0
46	* Andy Dalton	84	82	2	.506	Carolina Panthers	2023–2025	1	4	0
46	* Andy Dalton	84	82	2	.506	Philadelphia Eagles	2026–present	0	0	0
47	Randall Cunningham	82	52	1	.611	Philadelphia Eagles	1985–1995	63	43	1
47	Randall Cunningham	82	52	1	.611	Minnesota Vikings	1997–1999	16	7	0
47	Randall Cunningham	82	52	1	.611	Dallas Cowboys	2000	1	2	0
47	Randall Cunningham	82	52	1	.611	Baltimore Ravens	2001	2	0	0
47	John Hadl	82	75	9	.522	San Diego Chargers	1962–1972	59	54	9
47	John Hadl	82	75	9	.522	Los Angeles Rams	1973–1974	15	4	0
47	John Hadl	82	75	9	.522	Green Bay Packers	1974–1975	7	12	0
47	John Hadl	82	75	9	.522	Houston Oilers	1976–1977	1	5	0
49	Kerry Collins	81	99	0	.450	Carolina Panthers	1995–1998	22	20	0
49	Kerry Collins	81	99	0	.450	New Orleans Saints	1998	2	5	0
49	Kerry Collins	81	99	0	.450	New York Giants	1999–2003	35	33	0
49	Kerry Collins	81	99	0	.450	Oakland Raiders	2004–2005	7	21	0
49	Kerry Collins	81	99	0	.450	Tennessee Titans	2006–2010	15	17	0
49	Kerry Collins	81	99	0	.450	Indianapolis Colts	2011	0	3	0
49	^ Bobby Layne	81	61	5	.570	Chicago Bears	1948	0	0	0
49	^ Bobby Layne	81	61	5	.570	New York Bulldogs ^{b}	1949	1	10	1
49	^ Bobby Layne	81	61	5	.570	Detroit Lions	1950–1958	53	29	2
49	^ Bobby Layne	81	61	5	.570	Pittsburgh Steelers	1958–1962	27	22	2
49	Craig Morton	81	67	1	.547	Dallas Cowboys	1965–1974	32	14	1
49	Craig Morton	81	67	1	.547	New York Giants	1974–1976	8	25	0
49	Craig Morton	81	67	1	.547	Denver Broncos	1977–1982	41	23	0
49	Ryan Tannehill	81	70	0	.536	Miami Dolphins	2012–2018	42	46	0
49	Ryan Tannehill	81	70	0	.536	Tennessee Titans	2019–2023	39	24	0
53	Boomer Esiason	80	93	0	.462	Cincinnati Bengals	1984–1992, 1997	62	61	0
53	Boomer Esiason	80	93	0	.462	New York Jets	1993–1995	15	27	0
53	Boomer Esiason	80	93	0	.462	Arizona Cardinals	1996	3	5	0
54	Joe Ferguson	79	92	0	.462	Buffalo Bills	1973–1984	77	86	0
54	Joe Ferguson	79	92	0	.462	Detroit Lions	1985–1986	2	3	0
54	Joe Ferguson	79	92	0	.462	Tampa Bay Buccaneers	1988–1989	0	3	0
54	Joe Ferguson	79	92	0	.462	Indianapolis Colts	1990	0	0	0
54	* Lamar Jackson	79	33	0	.705	Baltimore Ravens	2018–present	79	33	0
56	Mark Brunell	78	73	0	.517	Green Bay Packers	1994	0	0	0
56	Mark Brunell	78	73	0	.517	Jacksonville Jaguars	1995–2003	63	54	0
56	Mark Brunell	78	73	0	.517	Washington Redskins	2004–2006	15	18	0
56	Mark Brunell	78	73	0	.517	New Orleans Saints	2008–2009	0	1	0
56	Mark Brunell	78	73	0	.517	New York Jets	2010–2011	0	0	0
56	Tony Romo	78	49	0	.614	Dallas Cowboys	2004–2016	78	49	0
56	^ Y. A. Tittle	78	50	5	.609	Baltimore Colts ^{c}	1950	1	6	0
56	^ Y. A. Tittle	78	50	5	.609	San Francisco 49ers	1951–1960	45	31	2
56	^ Y. A. Tittle	78	50	5	.609	New York Giants	1961–1964	32	13	3
59	Derek Carr	77	92	0	.456	Oakland/LV Raiders	2014–2022	63	79	0
59	Derek Carr	77	92	0	.456	New Orleans Saints	2023–2024	14	13	0
59	Joe Theismann	77	47	0	.621	Washington Redskins	1974–1985	77	47	0
61	Rich Gannon	76	56	0	.576	Minnesota Vikings	1987–1992	19	16	0
61	Rich Gannon	76	56	0	.576	Washington Redskins	1993	1	3	0
61	Rich Gannon	76	56	0	.576	Kansas City Chiefs	1995–1998	11	8	0
61	Rich Gannon	76	56	0	.576	Oakland Raiders	1999–2004	45	29	0
62	Steve Grogan	75	60	0	.556	New England Patriots	1975–1990	75	60	0
62	‡ Cam Newton	75	68	1	.524	Carolina Panthers	2011–2019, 2021	68	60	1
62	‡ Cam Newton	75	68	1	.524	New England Patriots	2020	7	8	0
64	John Brodie	74	76	8	.493	San Francisco 49ers	1957–1973	74	76	8
64	Jay Cutler	74	79	0	.484	Denver Broncos	2006–2008	17	20	0
64	Jay Cutler	74	79	0	.484	Chicago Bears	2009–2016	51	51	0
64	Jay Cutler	74	79	0	.484	Miami Dolphins	2017	6	8	0
66	Ron Jaworski	73	69	1	.514	Los Angeles Rams	1974–1976	3	0	0
66	Ron Jaworski	73	69	1	.514	Philadelphia Eagles	1977–1986	69	67	1
66	Ron Jaworski	73	69	1	.514	Miami Dolphins	1988	0	0	0
66	Ron Jaworski	73	69	1	.514	Kansas City Chiefs	1989	1	2	0
67	Brad Johnson	72	53	0	.576	Minnesota Vikings	1994–1998, 2005–2006	28	18	0
67	Brad Johnson	72	53	0	.576	Washington Redskins	1999–2000	17	10	0
67	Brad Johnson	72	53	0	.576	Tampa Bay Buccaneers	2001–2004	26	23	0
67	Brad Johnson	72	53	0	.576	Dallas Cowboys	2007–2008	1	2	0
67	Jim Plunkett	72	72	0	.500	New England Patriots	1971–1975	23	38	0
67	Jim Plunkett	72	72	0	.500	San Francisco 49ers	1976–1977	11	15	0
67	Jim Plunkett	72	72	0	.500	Oakland/LA Raiders	1979–1986	38	19	0
69	^ Sonny Jurgensen	69	71	7	.493	Philadelphia Eagles	1957–1963	17	20	2
69	^ Sonny Jurgensen	69	71	7	.493	Washington Redskins	1964–1974	52	51	5
69	Jake Plummer	69	67	0	.507	Arizona Cardinals	1997–2002	30	52	0
69	Jake Plummer	69	67	0	.507	Denver Broncos	2003–2006	39	15	0
71	Chris Chandler	67	85	0	.441	Indianapolis Colts	1988–1989	10	6	0
71	Chris Chandler	67	85	0	.441	Tampa Bay Buccaneers	1990–1991	0	6	0
71	Chris Chandler	67	85	0	.441	Phoenix Cardinals	1991–1993	5	12	0
71	Chris Chandler	67	85	0	.441	St. Louis/LA Rams	1994, 2004	2	6	0
71	Chris Chandler	67	85	0	.441	Houston Oilers	1995–1996	11	14	0
71	Chris Chandler	67	85	0	.441	Atlanta Falcons	1997–2001	34	33	0
71	Chris Chandler	67	85	0	.441	Chicago Bears	2002–2004	5	8	0
71	Jim McMahon	67	30	0	.691	Chicago Bears	1982–1988	46	15	0
71	Jim McMahon	67	30	0	.691	San Diego Chargers	1989	4	7	0
71	Jim McMahon	67	30	0	.691	Philadelphia Eagles	1990–1992	9	3	0
71	Jim McMahon	67	30	0	.691	Minnesota Vikings	1993	8	4	0
71	Jim McMahon	67	30	0	.691	Arizona Cardinals	1994	0	1	0
71	Jim McMahon	67	30	0	.691	Green Bay Packers	1995–1996	0	0	0
71	^ Kurt Warner	67	49	0	.578	St. Louis Rams	1998–2003	35	15	0
71	^ Kurt Warner	67	49	0	.578	New York Giants	2004	5	4	0
71	^ Kurt Warner	67	49	0	.578	Arizona Cardinals	2005–2009	27	30	0
74	Jim Harbaugh	66	74	0	.471	Chicago Bears	1987–1993	35	30	0
74	Jim Harbaugh	66	74	0	.471	Indianapolis Colts	1994–1997	20	26	0
74	Jim Harbaugh	66	74	0	.471	Baltimore Ravens	1998	5	7	0
74	Jim Harbaugh	66	74	0	.471	San Diego Chargers	1998–2000	6	11	0
74	Daryle Lamonica	66	16	6	.801	Buffalo Bills	1963–1966	4	0	0
74	Daryle Lamonica	66	16	6	.801	Oakland Raiders	1967–1974	62	16	6
76	Charlie Conerly^{d}	65	39	1	.625	New York Giants	1948–1961	65	39	1
76	Jack Kemp	65	37	3	.637	Pittsburgh Steelers	1957	0	0	0
76	Jack Kemp	65	37	3	.637	LA/San Diego Chargers	1960–1962	22	6	0
76	Jack Kemp	65	37	3	.637	Buffalo Bills	1962–1969	43	31	3
78	Jim Everett	64	92	0	.410	Los Angeles Rams	1986–1993	46	59	0
78	Jim Everett	64	92	0	.410	New Orleans Saints	1994–1996	17	30	0
78	Jim Everett	64	92	0	.410	San Diego Chargers	1997	1	0	0
79	Earl Morrall	63	36	3	.636	San Francisco 49ers	1956	1	3	0
79	Earl Morrall	63	36	3	.636	Pittsburgh Steelers	1957–1958	6	7	0
79	Earl Morrall	63	36	3	.636	Detroit Lions	1958–1964	15	11	1
79	Earl Morrall	63	36	3	.636	New York Giants	1965–1967	8	12	1
79	Earl Morrall	63	36	3	.636	Baltimore Colts	1968–1971	22	3	1
79	Earl Morrall	63	36	3	.636	Miami Dolphins	1972–1976	11	1	0
80	^ Joe Namath	62	63	4	.496	New York Jets	1965–1976	60	61	4
80	^ Joe Namath	62	63	4	.496	Los Angeles Rams	1977	2	2	0
80	Danny White	62	30	0	.674	Dallas Cowboys	1976–1988	62	30	0
82	Billy Kilmer	61	52	1	.540	New Orleans Saints	1967–1970	11	29	0
82	Billy Kilmer	61	52	1	.540	Washington Redskins	1971–1978	50	23	1
82	Jay Schroeder	61	38	0	.616	Washington Redskins	1985–1987	24	7	0
82	Jay Schroeder	61	38	0	.616	Los Angeles Raiders	1988–1992	32	25	0
82	Jay Schroeder	61	38	0	.616	Cincinnati Bengals	1993	0	3	0
82	Jay Schroeder	61	38	0	.616	Arizona Cardinals	1994	5	3	0
82	^ Norm Van Brocklin	61	36	4	.629	Los Angeles Rams	1949–1957	42	20	3
82	^ Norm Van Brocklin	61	36	4	.629	Philadelphia Eagles	1958–1960	19	16	1
82	Michael Vick	61	51	1	.544	Atlanta Falcons	2001–2006	38	28	1
82	Michael Vick	61	51	1	.544	Philadelphia Eagles	2009–2013	20	20	0
82	Michael Vick	61	51	1	.544	New York Jets	2014	1	2	0
82	Michael Vick	61	51	1	.544	Pittsburgh Steelers	2015	2	1	0
86	* Baker Mayfield	60	66	0	.476	Cleveland Browns	2018–2021	29	30	0
86	* Baker Mayfield	60	66	0	.476	Carolina Panthers	2022	1	5	0
86	* Baker Mayfield	60	66	0	.476	Los Angeles Rams	2022	1	3	0
86	* Baker Mayfield	60	66	0	.476	Tampa Bay Buccaneers	2023–present	29	28	0
87	Steve Bartkowski	59	68	0	.465	Atlanta Falcons	1975–1985	55	66	0
87	Steve Bartkowski	59	68	0	.465	Los Angeles Rams	1986	4	2	0
87	Ryan Fitzpatrick	59	87	1	.405	St. Louis Rams	2005–2006	0	3	0
87	Ryan Fitzpatrick	59	87	1	.405	Cincinnati Bengals	2007–2008	4	7	1
87	Ryan Fitzpatrick	59	87	1	.405	Buffalo Bills	2009–2012	20	33	0
87	Ryan Fitzpatrick	59	87	1	.405	Tennessee Titans	2013	3	6	0
87	Ryan Fitzpatrick	59	87	1	.405	Houston Texans	2014	6	6	0
87	Ryan Fitzpatrick	59	87	1	.405	New York Jets	2015–2016	13	14	0
87	Ryan Fitzpatrick	59	87	1	.405	Tampa Bay Buccaneers	2017–2018	4	6	0
87	Ryan Fitzpatrick	59	87	1	.405	Miami Dolphins	2019–2020	9	11	0
87	Ryan Fitzpatrick	59	87	1	.405	Washington Football Team	2021	0	1	0
87	* Jalen Hurts	59	28	0	.678	Philadelphia Eagles	2020–present	59	28	0
87	Charley Johnson	59	57	8	.508	St. Louis Cardinals	1961–1969	36	28	0
87	Charley Johnson	59	57	8	.508	Houston Oilers	1970–1971	3	11	0
87	Charley Johnson	59	57	8	.508	Denver Broncos	1972–1975	20	18	3
91	Trent Dilfer	58	55	0	.513	Tampa Bay Buccaneers	1994–1999	38	38	0
91	Trent Dilfer	58	55	0	.513	Baltimore Ravens	2000	7	1	0
91	Trent Dilfer	58	55	0	.513	Seattle Seahawks	2001–2004	8	4	0
91	Trent Dilfer	58	55	0	.513	Cleveland Browns	2005	4	7	0
91	Trent Dilfer	58	55	0	.513	San Francisco 49ers	2007	1	5	0
91	Jeff Garcia	58	58	0	.500	San Francisco 49ers	1999–2003	35	36	0
91	Jeff Garcia	58	58	0	.500	Cleveland Browns	2004	3	7	0
91	Jeff Garcia	58	58	0	.500	Detroit Lions	2005	1	4	0
91	Jeff Garcia	58	58	0	.500	Philadelphia Eagles	2006, 2009	5	1	0
91	Jeff Garcia	58	58	0	.500	Tampa Bay Buccaneers	2007–2008	14	10	0
91	Jeff Garcia	58	58	0	.500	Houston Texans	2011	0	0	0
93	^ Otto Graham^{e}	57	13	1	.814	Cleveland Browns	1946–1955	57	13	1
93	Frank Ryan	57	27	3	.667	Los Angeles Rams	1958–1961	5	5	1
93	Frank Ryan	57	27	3	.667	Cleveland Browns	1962–1968	52	22	2
93	Frank Ryan	57	27	3	.667	Washington Redskins	1969–1970	0	0	0
93	Brian Sipe	57	55	0	.509	Cleveland Browns	1974–1983	57	55	0
96	Jake Delhomme	56	40	0	.583	New Orleans Saints	1999, 2002	1	1	0
96	Jake Delhomme	56	40	0	.583	Carolina Panthers	2003–2009	53	37	0
96	Jake Delhomme	56	40	0	.583	Cleveland Browns	2010	2	2	0
96	Jake Delhomme	56	40	0	.583	Houston Texans	2011	0	0	0
96	Trent Green	56	57	0	.496	Washington Redskins	1997–1998	6	8	0
96	Trent Green	56	57	0	.496	St. Louis Rams	1999–2000, 2008	2	4	0
96	Trent Green	56	57	0	.496	Kansas City Chiefs	2001–2006	48	40	0
96	Trent Green	56	57	0	.496	Miami Dolphins	2007	0	5	0
96	Bobby Hebert	56	44	0	.560	New Orleans Saints	1985–1992	49	26	0
96	Bobby Hebert	56	44	0	.560	Atlanta Falcons	1993–1996	7	18	0
96	Dan Pastorini	56	61	0	.479	Houston Oilers	1971–1979	53	54	0
96	Dan Pastorini	56	61	0	.479	Oakland Raiders	1980	2	3	0
96	Dan Pastorini	56	61	0	.479	Los Angeles Rams	1981	1	4	0
96	Dan Pastorini	56	61	0	.479	Philadelphia Eagles	1983	0	0	0
96	Milt Plum	56	41	6	.577	Cleveland Browns	1957–1961	33	16	2
96	Milt Plum	56	41	6	.577	Detroit Lions	1962–1967	23	25	4
96	Milt Plum	56	41	6	.577	Los Angeles Rams	1968	0	0	0
96	Milt Plum	56	41	6	.577	New York Giants	1969	0	0	0
Rank	Quarterback	Career wins	Career losses	Career ties	Career win % ^{a}	Team(s)	Seasons	W	L	T

Notes

- ^aThe NFL did not count ties in the standings until 1972. Therefore, ties occurring prior to 1972 do not count toward a quarterback's win percentage, while ties occurring in 1972 or later count as half-win, half-loss.
- ^b Layne is listed as having started all 12 games for the Bulldogs (NFL) in 1949, and that team finished 1–10–1. Combined with his official post-1949 won–loss–tied record of 80–51–4 (.607), his overall estimated won–loss–tied record is 81–61–5 (.568).
- ^cThe 1950 Baltimore Colts are a defunct NFL team and not affiliated with the current Indianapolis Colts.
- ^dConerly is estimated to have gone 7–8–0 as a starter from 1948–1949. Combined with his official post-1949 record of 58–31–1 (.652), his overall estimated record is 65–39–1 (.625).
- ^e Graham also is estimated to have gone 48–4–3 as a starter from 1946–1949. Combined with his official post-1949 record of 57–13–1 (.814), his overall estimated record is 105–17–4 (.861).

=== Franchise leaders outside of the top 100 ===
The following quarterbacks have the most wins in the history of their franchise but are not in the top 100 for overall wins (this only includes active franchises).

Quarterback	Career wins	Career losses	Career ties	Career win % ^{a}	Team(s)	Seasons	W	L	T
Matt Schaub	47	46	0	.505	Atlanta Falcons	2004–2006; 2016–2020	0	3	0
Matt Schaub	47	46	0	.505	Houston Texans	2007–2013	46	42	0
Matt Schaub	47	46	0	.505	Oakland Raiders	2014	0	0	0
Matt Schaub	47	46	0	.505	Baltimore Ravens	2015	1	1	0

== Postseason wins ==
Key
^ Inducted into the Pro Football Hall of Fame
‡ Retired but not yet eligible for the Hall of Fame
* Active player

Rank	Quarterback	Career wins	Career losses	Career win % ^{a}	Team(s)	Seasons	W	L
1	‡ Tom Brady	35	13	.729	New England Patriots	2000–2019	30	11
1	‡ Tom Brady	35	13	.729	Tampa Bay Buccaneers	2020–2022	5	2
2	* Patrick Mahomes	17	4	.810	Kansas City Chiefs	2017–present	17	4
3	^ Joe Montana	16	7	.696	San Francisco 49ers	1979–1992	14	5
3	^ Joe Montana	16	7	.696	Kansas City Chiefs	1993–1994	2	2
4	^ Terry Bradshaw	14	5	.737	Pittsburgh Steelers	1970–1982	14	5
4	^ John Elway	14	7	.667	Denver Broncos	1983-1998	14	7
4	^ Peyton Manning	14	13	.519	Indianapolis Colts	1998–2011	9	10
4	^ Peyton Manning	14	13	.519	Denver Broncos	2012–2015	5	3
7	^ Brett Favre	13	11	.542	Green Bay Packers	1992–2007	12	10
7	^ Brett Favre	13	11	.542	Minnesota Vikings	2009–2010	1	1
7	‡ Ben Roethlisberger	13	10	.565	Pittsburgh Steelers	2004–2021	13	10
9	^ Troy Aikman	11	4	.733	Dallas Cowboys	1989–2000	11	4
9	* Aaron Rodgers	11	11	.500	Green Bay Packers	2005–2022	11	10
9	* Aaron Rodgers	11	11	.500	Pittsburgh Steelers	2025–present	0	1
9	^ Roger Staubach	11	6	.647	Dallas Cowboys	1969–1979	11	6
12	* Joe Flacco	10	6	.625	Baltimore Ravens	2008–2018	10	5
12	* Joe Flacco	10	6	.625	Cleveland Browns	2023	0	1
13	^ Drew Brees	9	9	.500	San Diego Chargers	2001–2005	0	1
13	^ Drew Brees	9	9	.500	New Orleans Saints	2006–2020	9	8
13	^ Jim Kelly	9	8	.529	Buffalo Bills	1986–1996	9	8
13	Donovan McNabb	9	7	.563	Philadelphia Eagles	1999–2009	9	7
13	^ Bart Starr	9	1	.900	Green Bay Packers	1956–1971	9	1
13	^ Kurt Warner	9	4	.692	St. Louis Rams	1998–2003	5	2
13	^ Kurt Warner	9	4	.692	Arizona Cardinals	2005–2009	4	2
13	‡ Russell Wilson	9	8	.529	Seattle Seahawks	2012–2021	9	7
13	‡ Russell Wilson	9	8	.529	Pittsburgh Steelers	2024	0	1
19	* Josh Allen	8	7	.533	Buffalo Bills	2018–present	8	7
19	Eli Manning	8	4	.667	New York Giants	2004–2019	8	4
19	^ Dan Marino	8	10	.444	Miami Dolphins	1983–1999	8	10
19	Jim Plunkett	8	2	.800	Oakland/LA Raiders	1979–1986	8	2
19	^ Steve Young	8	6	.571	San Francisco 49ers	1987–1999	8	6
24	^ Ken Stabler	7	5	.583	Oakland Raiders	1970–1979	7	4
24	^ Ken Stabler	7	5	.583	Houston Oilers	1980–1981	0	1
24	* Matthew Stafford	7	6	.538	Detroit Lions	2009–2020	0	3
24	* Matthew Stafford	7	6	.538	Los Angeles Rams	2021–present	7	2

== See also ==
- NFL individual wins records
- NFL starting quarterback playoff records
- List of most consecutive starts by a National Football League quarterback
- List of NFL quarterbacks by teams beaten
