= List of Super Bowl starting quarterbacks =

Listing of Super Bowl starting quarterbacks

This is a list of National Football League (NFL) quarterbacks who have started in the Super Bowl.

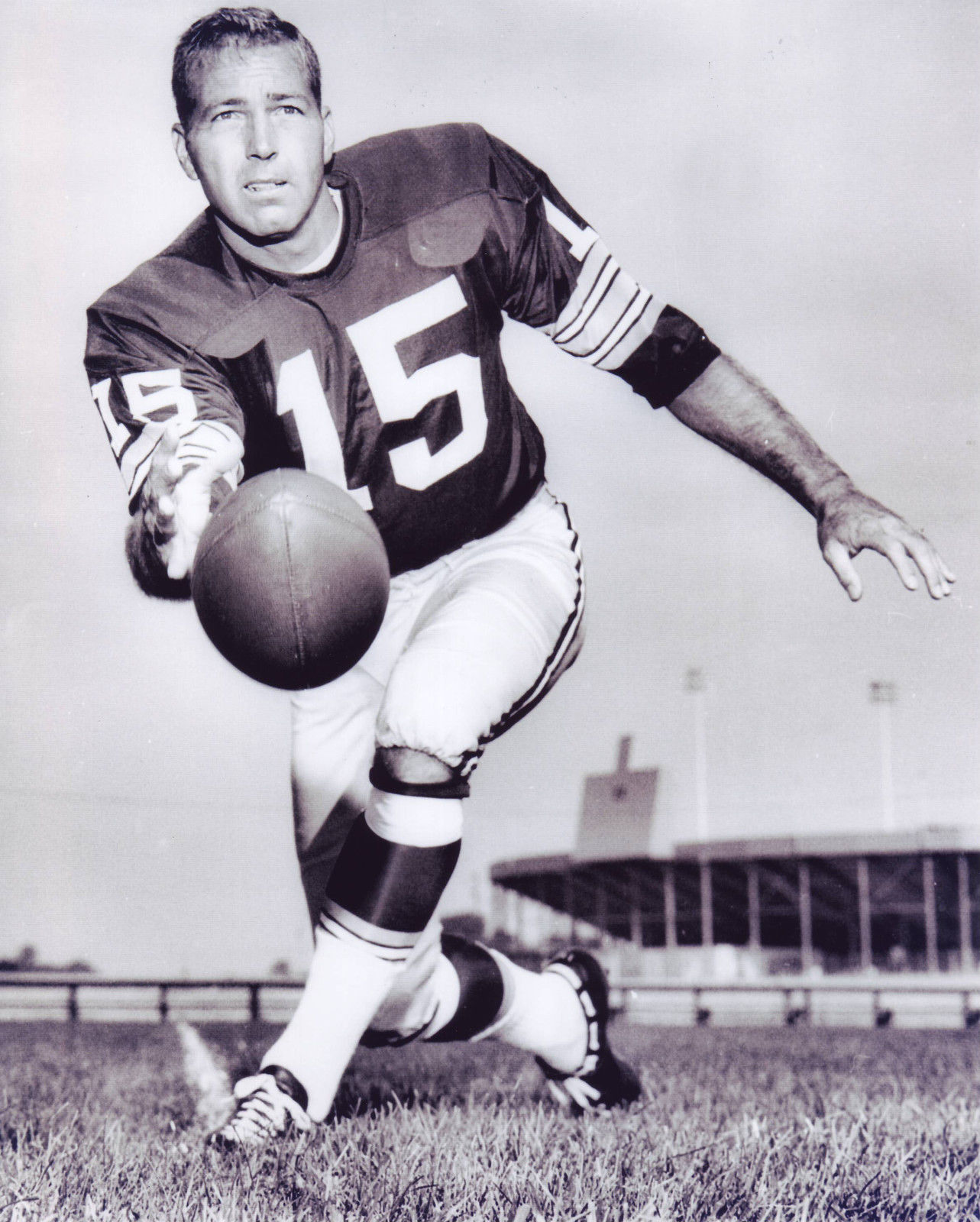
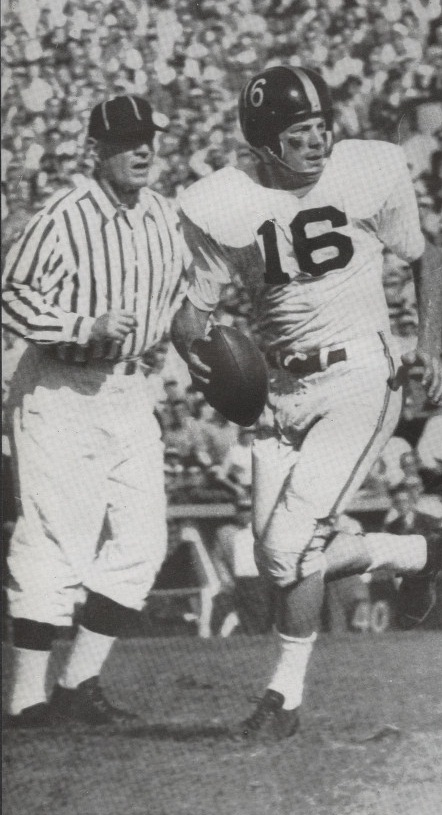
Hall of Famers Bart Starr (top) and Len Dawson (bottom) started in the first Super Bowl for the Green Bay Packers and Kansas City Chiefs respectively.

== Winning and losing quarterbacks ==
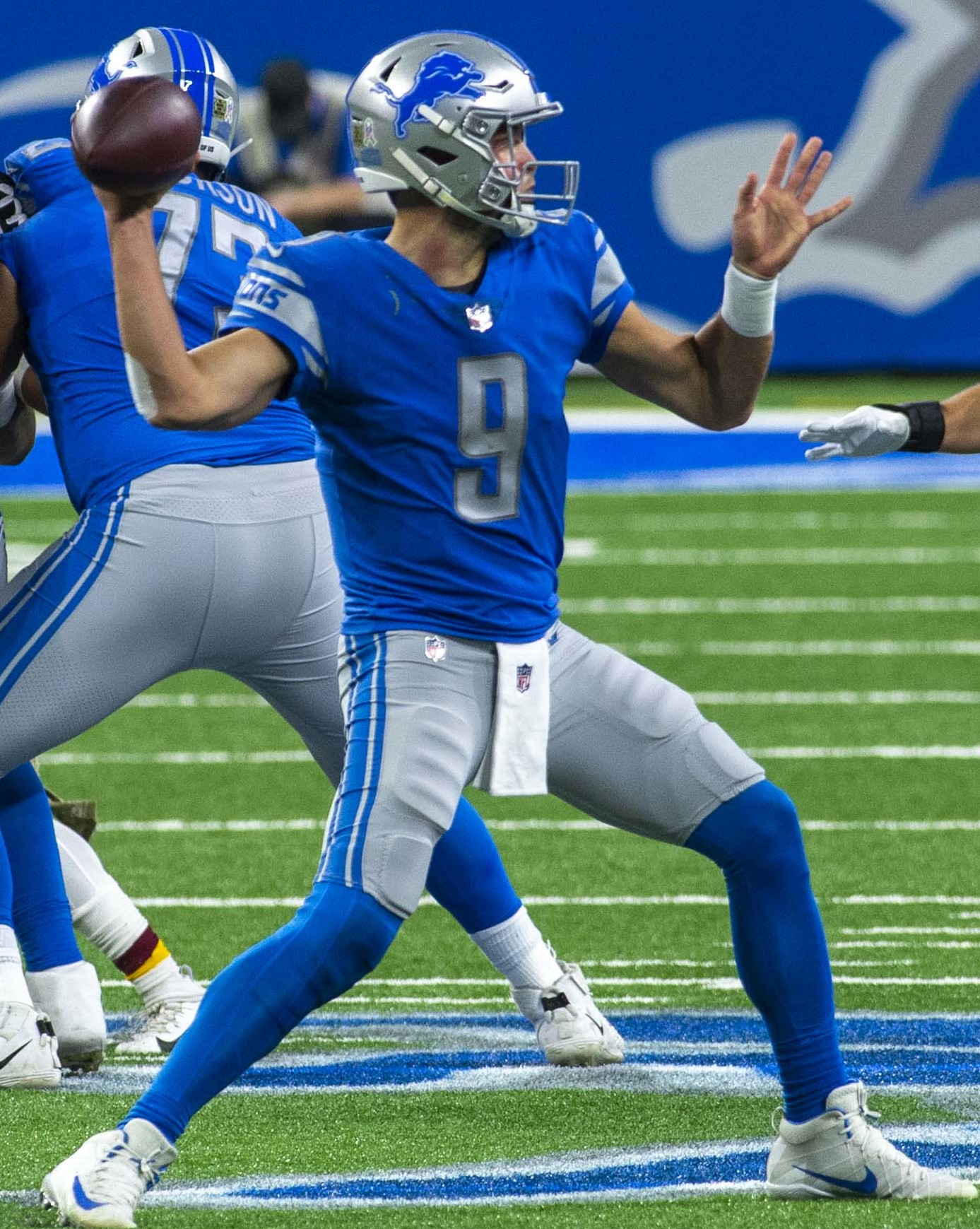
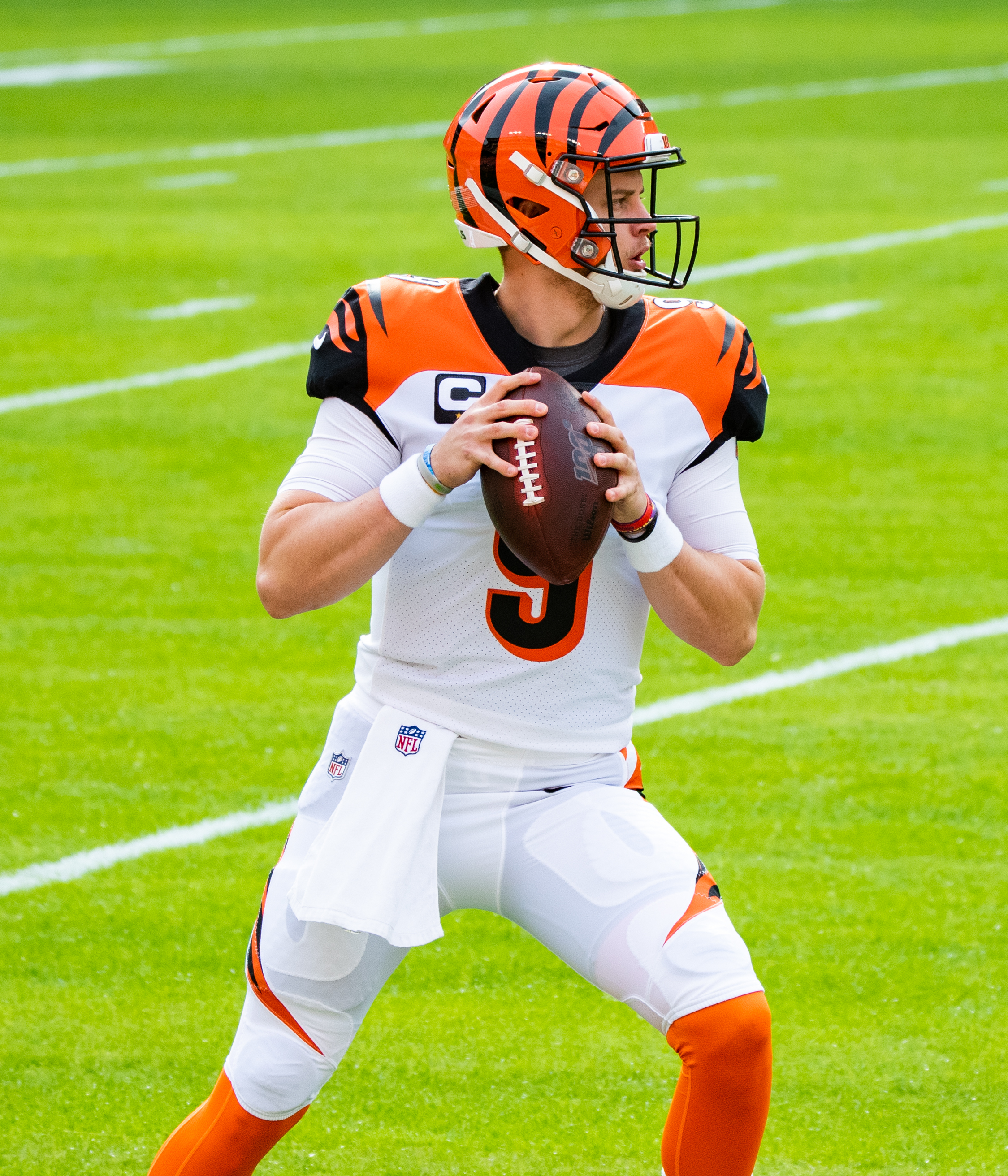
Matthew Stafford (top) and Joe Burrow (bottom) faced off in Super Bowl LVI for the Los Angeles Rams and Cincinnati Bengals respectively.
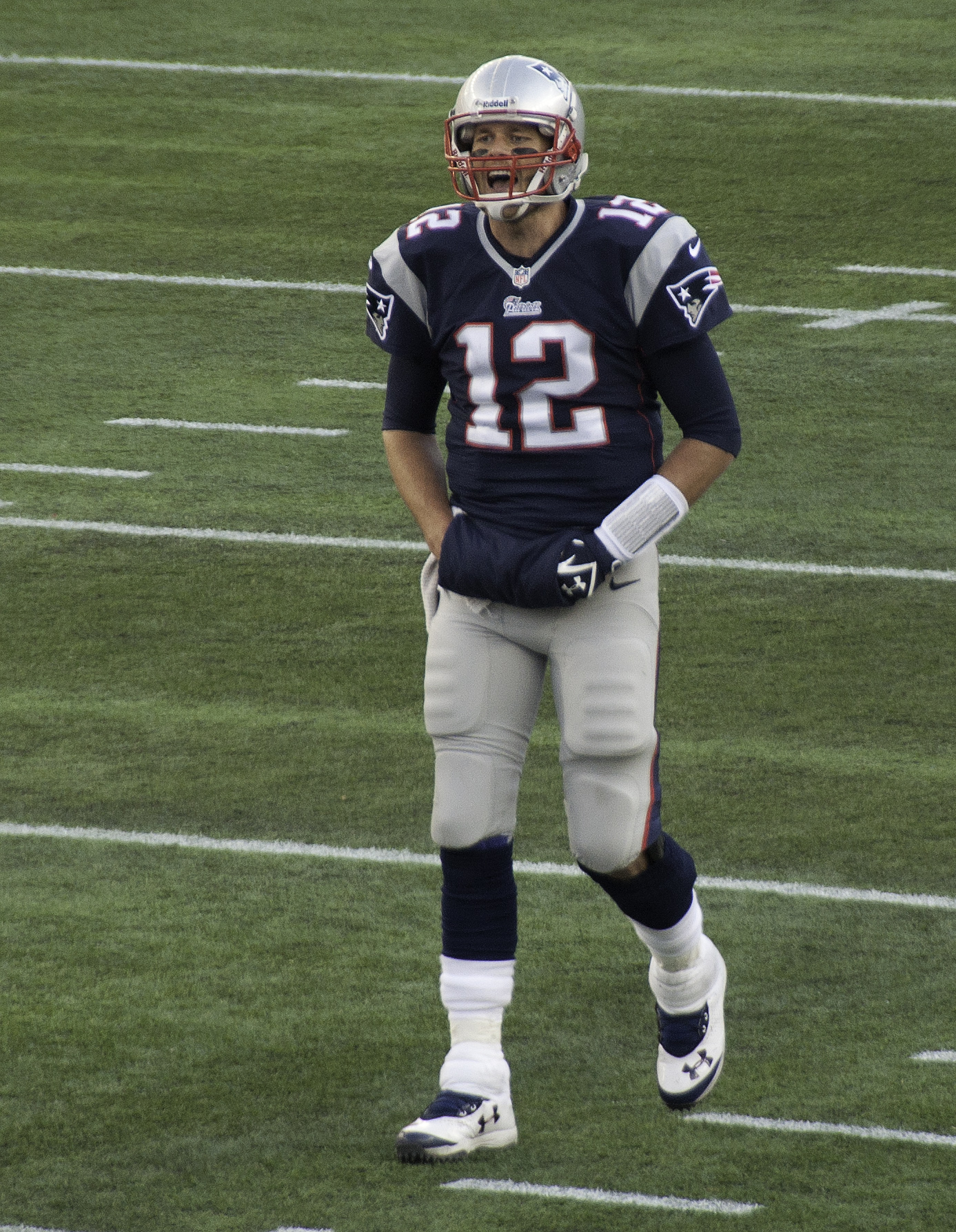
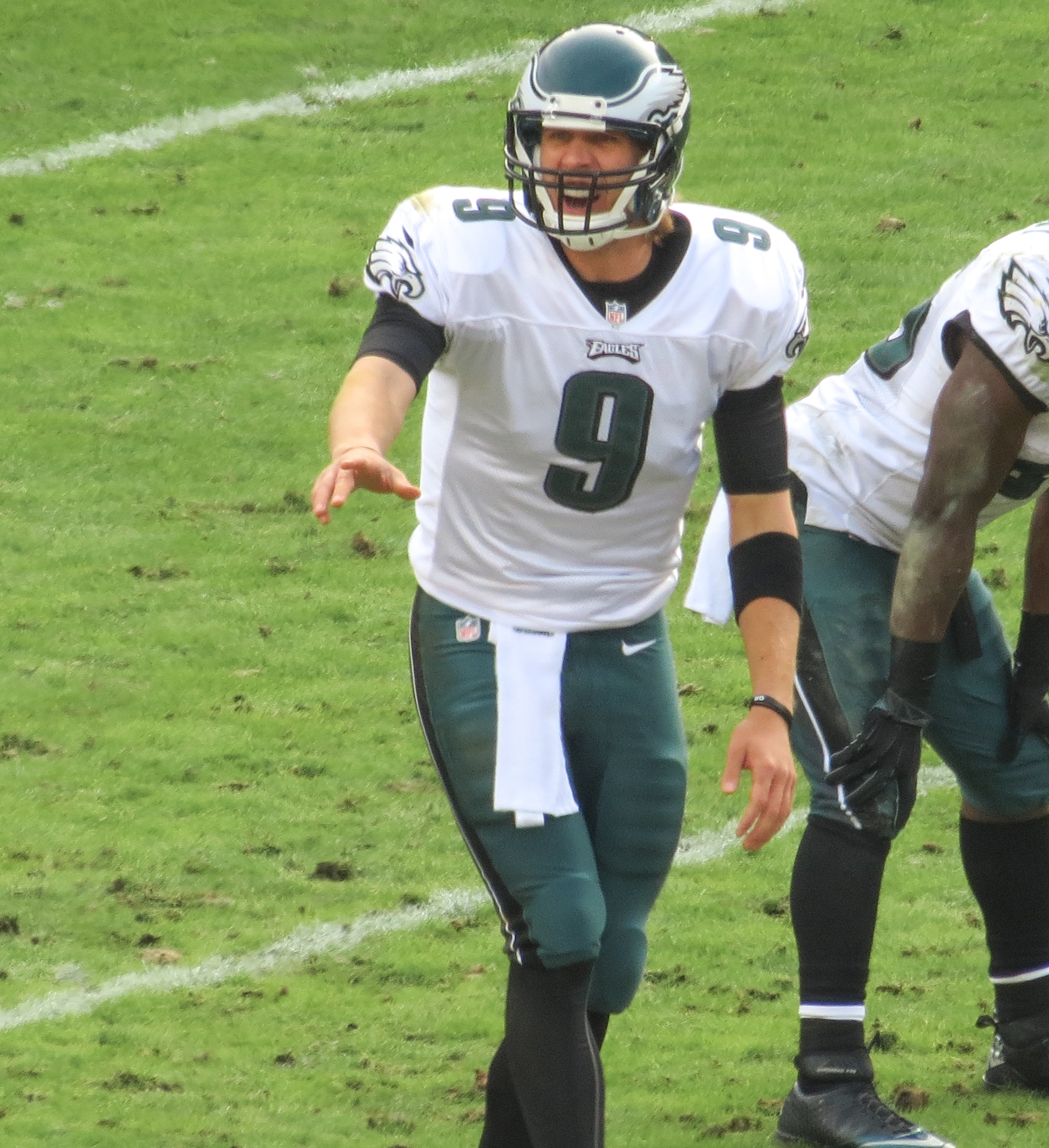
Tom Brady (top) and Nick Foles (bottom) faced off in the second highest-scoring Super Bowl, Super Bowl LII for the New England Patriots and the Philadelphia Eagles respectively.

Hall of Famers^{*}	NFL^{n}/NFC^{N} team
Active player^{†}	AFL^{a}/AFC^{A} team

Season	Super Bowl	Winning QB	Team	Losing QB	Team
1966 AFL/NFL	I	Bart Starr^{*}^{MVP}	Green Bay Packers^{n}	Len Dawson^{*}	Kansas City Chiefs^{a}
1967 AFL/NFL	II	Bart Starr^{*}^{MVP}	Green Bay Packers^{n}	Daryle Lamonica	Oakland Raiders^{a}
1968 AFL/NFL	III	Joe Namath^{*}^{MVP}	New York Jets^{a}	Earl Morrall	Baltimore Colts^{n}
1969 AFL/NFL	IV	Len Dawson^{*}^{MVP}	Kansas City Chiefs^{a}	Joe Kapp	Minnesota Vikings^{n}
1970	V	Johnny Unitas^{*}	Baltimore Colts^{A}	Craig Morton	Dallas Cowboys^{N}
1971	VI	Roger Staubach^{*}^{MVP}	Dallas Cowboys^{N}	Bob Griese^{*}	Miami Dolphins^{A}
1972	VII	Bob Griese^{*}	Miami Dolphins^{A}	Billy Kilmer	Washington Redskins^{N}
1973	VIII	Bob Griese^{*}	Miami Dolphins^{A}	Fran Tarkenton^{*}	Minnesota Vikings^{N}
1974	IX	Terry Bradshaw^{*}	Pittsburgh Steelers^{A}	Fran Tarkenton^{*}	Minnesota Vikings^{N}
1975	X	Terry Bradshaw^{*}	Pittsburgh Steelers^{A}	Roger Staubach^{*}	Dallas Cowboys^{N}
1976	XI	Ken Stabler^{*}	Oakland Raiders^{A}	Fran Tarkenton^{*}	Minnesota Vikings^{N}
1977	XII	Roger Staubach^{*}	Dallas Cowboys^{N}	Craig Morton	Denver Broncos^{A}
1978	XIII	Terry Bradshaw^{*}^{MVP}	Pittsburgh Steelers^{A}	Roger Staubach^{*}	Dallas Cowboys^{N}
1979	XIV	Terry Bradshaw^{*}^{MVP}	Pittsburgh Steelers^{A}	Vince Ferragamo	Los Angeles Rams^{N}
1980	XV	Jim Plunkett^{MVP}	Oakland Raiders^{A}	Ron Jaworski	Philadelphia Eagles^{N}
1981	XVI	Joe Montana^{*}^{MVP}	San Francisco 49ers^{N}	Ken Anderson	Cincinnati Bengals^{A}
1982	XVII	Joe Theismann	Washington Redskins^{N}	David Woodley	Miami Dolphins^{A}
1983	XVIII	Jim Plunkett	Los Angeles Raiders^{A}	Joe Theismann	Washington Redskins^{N}
1984	XIX	Joe Montana^{*}^{MVP}	San Francisco 49ers^{N}	Dan Marino^{*}	Miami Dolphins^{A}
1985	XX	Jim McMahon	Chicago Bears^{N}	Tony Eason	New England Patriots^{A}
1986	XXI	Phil Simms^{MVP}	New York Giants^{N}	John Elway^{*}	Denver Broncos^{A}
1987	XXII	Doug Williams^{MVP}	Washington Redskins^{N}	John Elway^{*}	Denver Broncos^{A}
1988	XXIII	Joe Montana^{*}	San Francisco 49ers^{N}	Boomer Esiason	Cincinnati Bengals^{A}
1989	XXIV	Joe Montana^{*}^{MVP}	San Francisco 49ers^{N}	John Elway^{*}	Denver Broncos^{A}
1990	XXV	Jeff Hostetler	New York Giants^{N}	Jim Kelly^{*}	Buffalo Bills^{A}
1991	XXVI	Mark Rypien^{MVP}	Washington Redskins^{N}	Jim Kelly^{*}	Buffalo Bills^{A}
1992	XXVII	Troy Aikman^{*}^{MVP}	Dallas Cowboys^{N}	Jim Kelly^{*}	Buffalo Bills^{A}
1993	XXVIII	Troy Aikman^{*}	Dallas Cowboys^{N}	Jim Kelly^{*}	Buffalo Bills^{A}
1994	XXIX	Steve Young^{*}^{MVP}	San Francisco 49ers^{N}	Stan Humphries	San Diego Chargers^{A}
1995	XXX	Troy Aikman^{*}	Dallas Cowboys^{N}	Neil O'Donnell	Pittsburgh Steelers^{A}
1996	XXXI	Brett Favre^{*}	Green Bay Packers^{N}	Drew Bledsoe	New England Patriots^{A}
1997	XXXII	John Elway^{*}	Denver Broncos^{A}	Brett Favre^{*}	Green Bay Packers^{N}
1998	XXXIII	John Elway^{*}^{MVP}	Denver Broncos^{A}	Chris Chandler	Atlanta Falcons^{N}
1999	XXXIV	Kurt Warner^{*}^{MVP}	St. Louis Rams^{N}	Steve McNair	Tennessee Titans^{A}
2000	XXXV	Trent Dilfer	Baltimore Ravens^{A}	Kerry Collins	New York Giants^{N}
2001	XXXVI	Tom Brady^{MVP}	New England Patriots^{A}	Kurt Warner^{*}	St. Louis Rams^{N}
2002	XXXVII	Brad Johnson	Tampa Bay Buccaneers^{N}	Rich Gannon	Oakland Raiders^{A}
2003	XXXVIII	Tom Brady^{MVP}	New England Patriots^{A}	Jake Delhomme	Carolina Panthers^{N}
2004	XXXIX	Tom Brady	New England Patriots^{A}	Donovan McNabb	Philadelphia Eagles^{N}
2005	XL	Ben Roethlisberger	Pittsburgh Steelers^{A}	Matt Hasselbeck	Seattle Seahawks^{N}
2006	XLI	Peyton Manning^{*}^{MVP}	Indianapolis Colts^{A}	Rex Grossman	Chicago Bears^{N}
2007	XLII	Eli Manning^{MVP}	New York Giants^{N}	Tom Brady	New England Patriots^{A}
2008	XLIII	Ben Roethlisberger	Pittsburgh Steelers^{A}	Kurt Warner^{*}	Arizona Cardinals^{N}
2009	XLIV	Drew Brees^{*}^{MVP}	New Orleans Saints^{N}	Peyton Manning^{*}	Indianapolis Colts^{A}
2010	XLV	Aaron Rodgers^{†}^{MVP}	Green Bay Packers^{N}	Ben Roethlisberger	Pittsburgh Steelers^{A}
2011	XLVI	Eli Manning^{MVP}	New York Giants^{N}	Tom Brady	New England Patriots^{A}
2012	XLVII	Joe Flacco^{†}^{MVP}	Baltimore Ravens^{A}	Colin Kaepernick	San Francisco 49ers^{N}
2013	XLVIII	Russell Wilson	Seattle Seahawks^{N}	Peyton Manning^{*}	Denver Broncos^{A}
2014	XLIX	Tom Brady^{MVP}	New England Patriots^{A}	Russell Wilson^{†}	Seattle Seahawks^{N}
2015	50	Peyton Manning^{*}	Denver Broncos^{A}	Cam Newton	Carolina Panthers^{N}
2016	LI	Tom Brady^{MVP}	New England Patriots^{A}	Matt Ryan	Atlanta Falcons^{N}
2017	LII	Nick Foles^{MVP}	Philadelphia Eagles^{N}	Tom Brady	New England Patriots^{A}
2018	LIII	Tom Brady	New England Patriots^{A}	Jared Goff^{†}	Los Angeles Rams^{N}
2019	LIV	Patrick Mahomes^{†}^{MVP}	Kansas City Chiefs^{A}	Jimmy Garoppolo^{†}	San Francisco 49ers^{N}
2020	LV	Tom Brady^{MVP}	Tampa Bay Buccaneers^{N}	Patrick Mahomes^{†}	Kansas City Chiefs^{A}
2021	LVI	Matthew Stafford^{†}	Los Angeles Rams^{N}	Joe Burrow^{†}	Cincinnati Bengals^{A}
2022	LVII	Patrick Mahomes^{†}^{MVP}	Kansas City Chiefs^{A}	Jalen Hurts^{†}	Philadelphia Eagles^{N}
2023	LVIII	Patrick Mahomes^{†}^{MVP}	Kansas City Chiefs^{A}	Brock Purdy^{†}	San Francisco 49ers^{N}
2024	LIX	Jalen Hurts^{†}^{MVP}	Philadelphia Eagles^{N}	Patrick Mahomes^{†}	Kansas City Chiefs^{A}
2025	LX	Sam Darnold^{†}	Seattle Seahawks^{N}	Drake Maye^{†}	New England Patriots^{A}
Season	Super Bowl	Winning QB	Team	Losing QB	Team

== Quarterbacks with multiple Super Bowl starts ==
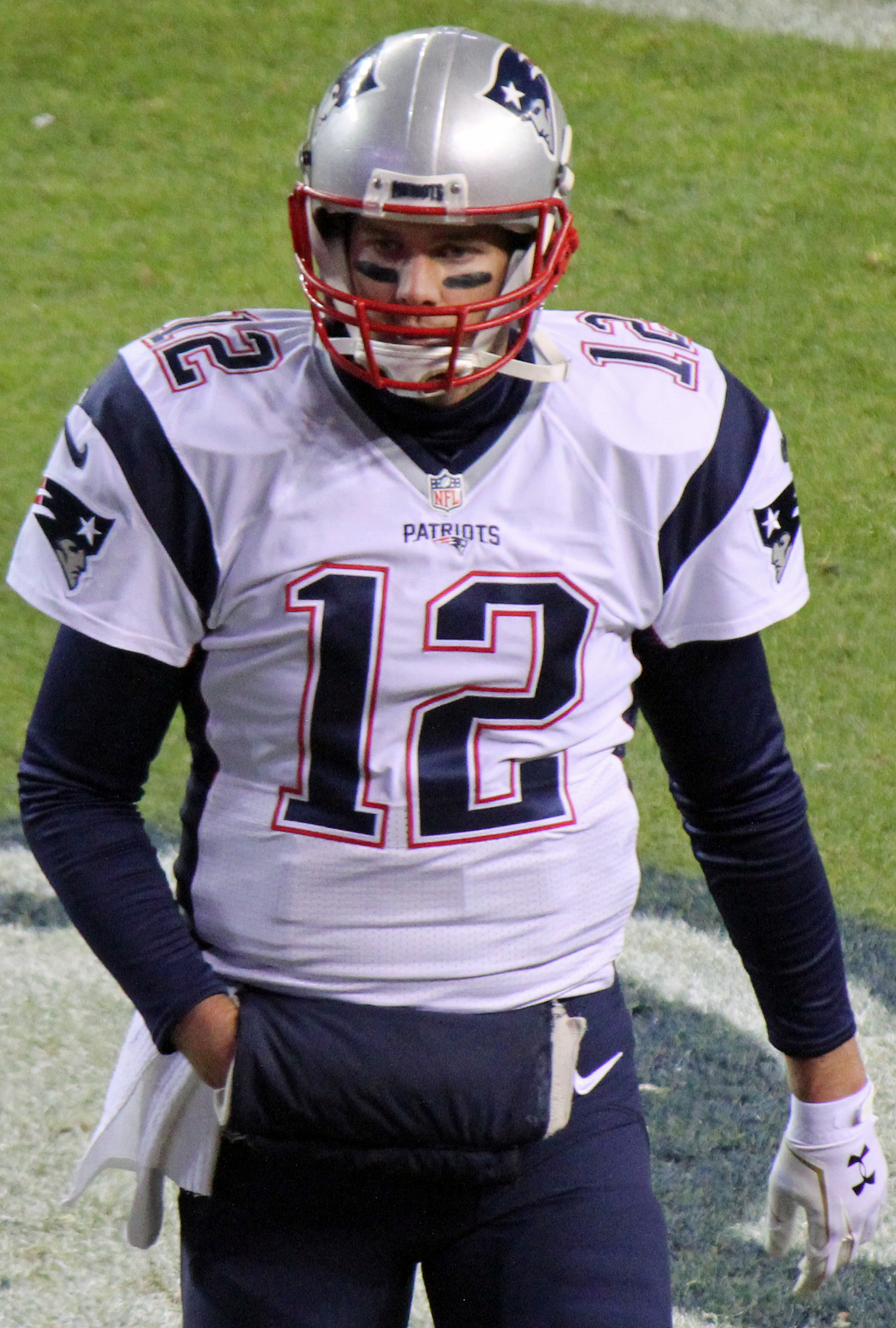
Tom Brady started ten Super Bowls, double that of John Elway, who is second. Brady won seven.

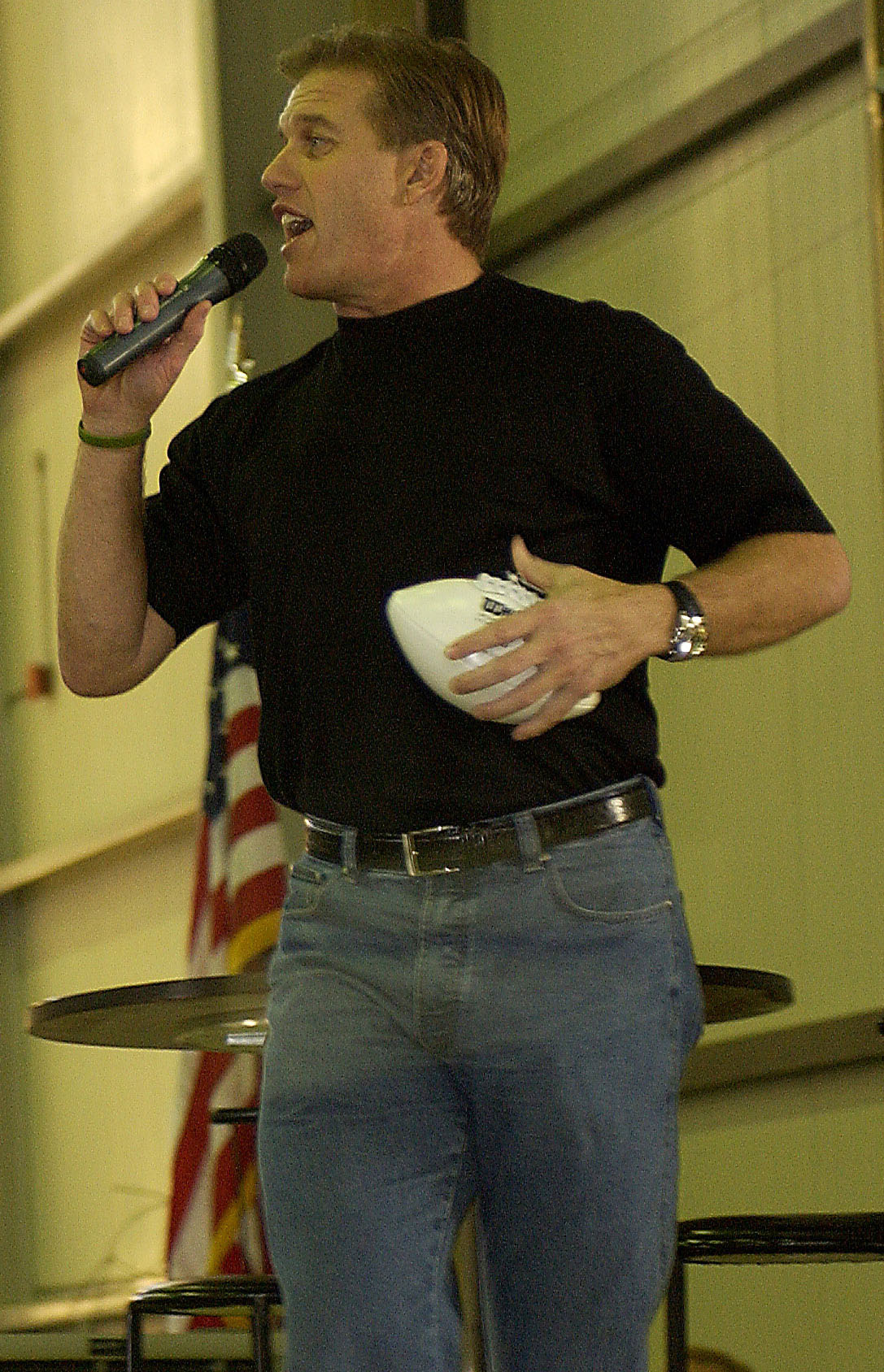
John Elway started five Super Bowls, winning two.

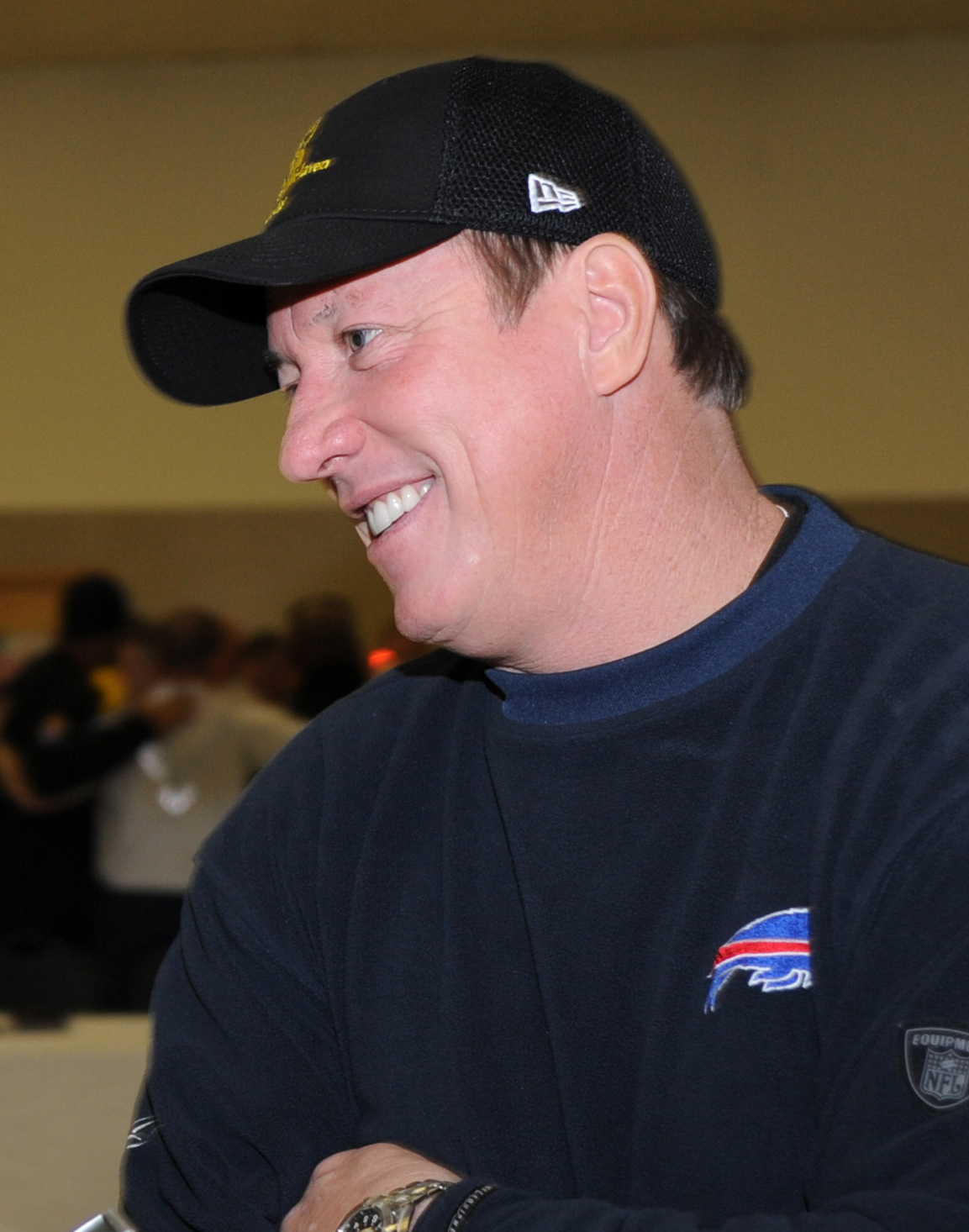
Jim Kelly started four Super Bowls without winning any, a record. He's one of eight quarterbacks who have started at least four Super Bowls.

Super Bowl wins are often used to determine the greatness of a quarterback. Of the eligible players, only Jim Plunkett and Eli Manning have won multiple Super Bowls and not been inducted into the Hall of Fame. Peyton Manning and Tom Brady are the only starting quarterbacks to have won Super Bowls for two NFL teams, while Craig Morton and Kurt Warner are the only other quarterbacks to have started for a second team. Jim McMahon won a second Super Bowl ring having been a backup on the Brett Favre-led Green Bay Packers team that won Super Bowl XXXI.

Starts	Win(s)		Player	Record		Team(s)	Super Bowl(s)	Win %		Ref
10	7	6	Tom Brady	7–3	6–3	New England Patriots^{A}	XXXVI, XXXVIII, XXXIX, XLII, XLVI, XLIX, LI, LII, LIII	.700	.667	
10	7	1	Tom Brady	7–3	1–0	Tampa Bay Buccaneers^{N}	LV	.700	1.000	
5	3		Patrick Mahomes^{†}	3–2		Kansas City Chiefs^{A}	LIV, LV, LVII, LVIII, LIX	.600		
5	2		John Elway^{*}	2–3		Denver Broncos^{A}	XXI, XXII, XXIV, XXXII, XXXIII	.400		
4	4		Terry Bradshaw^{*}	4–0		Pittsburgh Steelers^{A}	IX, X, XIII, XIV	1.000		
4	4		Joe Montana^{*}	4–0		San Francisco 49ers^{N}	XVI, XIX, XXIII, XXIV	1.000		
4	2		Roger Staubach^{*}	2–2		Dallas Cowboys^{N}	VI, X, XII, XIII	.500		
4	2	1	Peyton Manning^{*}	2–2	1–1	Indianapolis Colts^{A}	XLI, XLIV	.500	.500	
4	2	1	Peyton Manning^{*}	2–2	1–1	Denver Broncos^{A}	XLVIII, 50	.500	.500	
4	0		Jim Kelly^{*}	0–4		Buffalo Bills^{A}	XXV, XXVI, XXVII, XXVIII	.000		
3	3		Troy Aikman^{*}	3–0		Dallas Cowboys^{N}	XXVII, XXVIII, XXX	1.000		
3	2		Bob Griese^{*}	2–1		Miami Dolphins^{A}	VI, VII, VIII	.667		
3	2		Ben Roethlisberger	2–1		Pittsburgh Steelers^{A}	XL, XLIII, XLV	.667		
3	1	1	Kurt Warner^{*}	1–2	1–1	St. Louis Rams^{N}	XXXIV, XXXVI	.333	.500	
3	1	0	Kurt Warner^{*}	1–2	0–1	Arizona Cardinals^{N}	XLIII	.333	.000	
3	0		Fran Tarkenton^{*}	0–3		Minnesota Vikings^{N}	VIII, IX, XI	.000		
2	2		Bart Starr^{*}	2–0		Green Bay Packers^{n}	I, II	1.000		
2	2		Jim Plunkett	2–0		Oakland/Los Angeles Raiders^{A}	XV, XVIII	1.000		
2	2		Eli Manning	2–0		New York Giants^{N}	XLII, XLVI	1.000		
2	1		Len Dawson^{*}	1–1		Kansas City Chiefs^{a}	I, IV	.500		
2	1		Joe Theismann	1–1		Washington Redskins^{N}	XVII, XVIII	.500		
2	1		Brett Favre^{*}	1–1		Green Bay Packers^{N}	XXXI, XXXII	.500		
2	1		Russell Wilson^{†}	1–1		Seattle Seahawks^{N}	XLVIII, XLIX	.500		
2	1		Jalen Hurts^{†}	1–1		Philadelphia Eagles^{N}	LVII, LIX	.500		
2	0	0	Craig Morton	0–2	0–1	Dallas Cowboys^{N}	V	.000	.000	
2	0	0	Craig Morton	0–2	0–1	Denver Broncos^{A}	XII	.000	.000	
Starts	Win(s)		Player	Record		Team(s)	Super Bowl(s)	Win %		Ref

=== Notes ===
- BOLD formatting indicates that the game was won.
- Starr was 3–1 in NFL Championship games (1960, 1961, 1962, and 1965) played before the NFL and AFL met in the first Super Bowl.
- Dawson was 1–0 in an AFL Championship game (1962) played before the NFL and AFL first met in the Super Bowl.
- Four pairs of quarterbacks faced off twice in the Super Bowl: Staubach and Bradshaw, Aikman and Kelly, Brady and Eli Manning, and Mahomes and Hurts. In three of the four cases, the same quarterback (Bradshaw, Aikman, and Manning) won both games.

== See also ==
- List of Super Bowl champions
- List of Super Bowl MVPs
- List of Super Bowl head coaches
- List of National Football League quarterback playoff records
