= Glen Howe =

American football player (born 1961)

No. 76, 71
- Position: Offensive tackle

Personal information
- Born: October 18, 1961 (age 65); New Albany, Mississippi, U.S.
- Listed height: 6 ft 7 in (2.01 m)
- Listed weight: 295 lb (134 kg)

Career information
- High school: W. P. Daniel
- College: Southern Miss
- NFL draft: 1984: 9th round, 233rd overall pick

Career history
- Atlanta Falcons (1984)*; Pittsburgh Steelers (1985); Atlanta Falcons (1985–1986); Dallas Cowboys (1987); New York Jets (1988)*
- * Offseason or practice squad member only

Awards and highlights
- 2× First-team All-South Independent (1982, 1983); Second-team All-South Independent (1981)
- Stats at Pro Football Reference

Bobby Glen Howe (born October 18, 1961) is an American former professional football offensive tackle who played in the National Football League (NFL) with the Atlanta Falcons and Pittsburgh Steelers. He played college football for the Southern Miss Golden Eagles and was selected by the Falcons in the ninth round of the 1984 NFL draft.

== Early life ==
Bobby Glen Howe was born on October 18, 1961, in New Albany, Mississippi. He attended W. P. Daniel High School in New Albany.

== College career ==
Howe enrolled at the University of Southern Mississippi to play college football for the Golden Eagles. He became a starter late in his freshman year of 1980 after Joey Hendrix became injured. Howe remained a full-time starter from 1981 to 1983. He was named second-team All-South Independent by the Associated Press (AP) in 1981, and first-team All-South Independent by the AP in both 1982 and 1983. Howe briefly started at offensive guard during the middle of the 1983 season due to Fred Richards having suffered an injury. Howe was inducted into the Southern Miss M-Club Hall of Fame in 1991.

== Professional career ==
Howe was selected by the Atlanta Falcons in the ninth round, with the 233rd overall pick, of the 1984 NFL draft. He signed with the team on June 4. He was released on August 26, 1984, after the fourth preseason game.

Howe signed with the Pittsburgh Steelers on May 9, 1985. He was released on September 2, re-signed on September 3, and released again on October 4. He played in two games overall for the Steelers during the 1985 season as a reserve offensive tackle.

Howe was signed by the Falcons again on November 19, 1985. He played in the final five regular season games, starting one, for Atlanta in 1985. He was placed on injured reserve on August 26, 1986. He was released on October 15 but re-signed on October 17. Howe appeared in seven games, starting three, overall for the Falcons during the 1986 season. He was released on September 7, 1987, before the start of the 1987 regular season.

Howe signed with the Dallas Cowboys on September 15, 1987. He missed three games during the 1987 NFL players strike. He was released on November 2, 1987, before ever playing for the Cowboys.

Howe was signed by the New York Jets on April 29, 1988. He was waived on August 29, 1988, after the fourth preseason game.
