= Chuck Slaughter =

American football player (born 1958)

No. 79, 65
- Position: Offensive tackle

Personal information
- Born: November 21, 1958 (age 67); Conway, South Carolina, U.S.
- Listed height: 6 ft 5 in (1.96 m)
- Listed weight: 260 lb (118 kg)

Career information
- High school: Fort Johnson (Charleston, South Carolina)
- College: South Carolina
- NFL draft: 1982: 8th round, 198th overall pick

Career history
- New Orleans Saints (1982); Washington Federals (1984)

Awards and highlights
- First-team All-South Independent (1981)
- Stats at Pro Football Reference

Chuck Gary Slaughter (born November 21, 1958) is an American former professional football offensive tackle who played for the New Orleans Saints of the National Football League (NFL). He played college football for the South Carolina Gamecocks and was selected by the Saints in the eighth round of the 1982 NFL draft

== Early life ==
Chuck Gary Slaughter was born on November 21, 1958, in Conway, South Carolina. He played high school football at Fort Johnson High School in Charleston, South Carolina, helping them win multiple state championships.

== College career ==
In February 1977, Slaughter committed to the University of South Carolina to play college football for the Gamecocks. He was a four-year letterman from 1978 to 1981. He earned Associated Press first-team All-South Independent honors as a senior in 1981.

== Professional career ==
Slaughter was selected by the New Orleans Saints in the eighth round, with the 198th overall pick, of the 1982 NFL draft. He played in one game for the Saints during the 1982 season as a reserve offensive tackle. He was released on August 29, 1983, after the final game of the 1983 preseason.

On November 15, 1983, Slaughter signed with the Washington Federals of the United States Football League (USFL) for the 1984 USFL season. He played in 17 games as the team went 3–15. After the 1984 season, the Federals became the Orlando Renegades. Slaughter was released by the Renegades on February 11, 1985, 12 days before the 1985 regular season opener.
