= Jim Kelly =

American football player (born 1960)

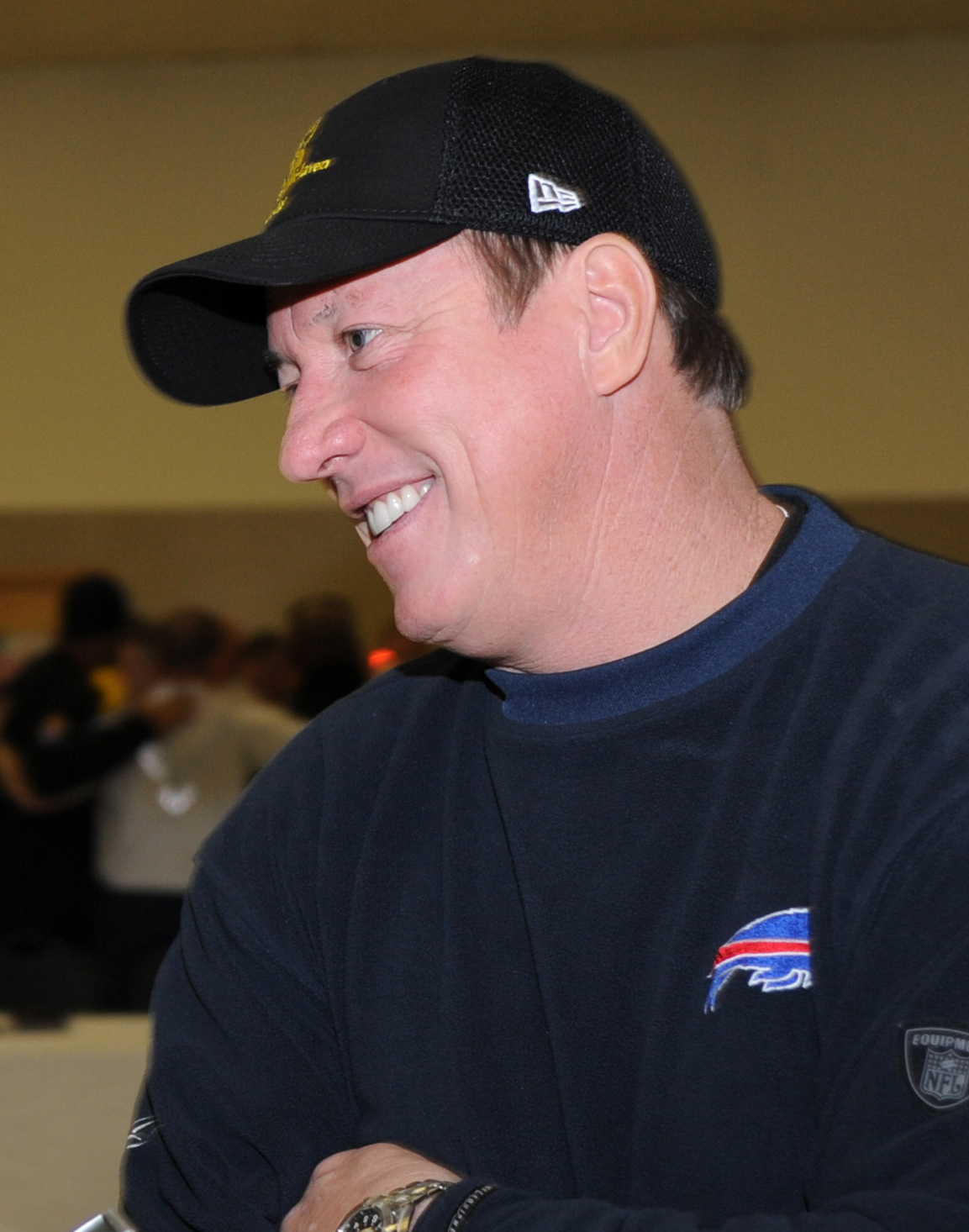
- Kelly in 2010

No. 12
- Position: Quarterback

Personal information
- Born: February 14, 1960 (age 66); Pittsburgh, Pennsylvania, U.S.
- Listed height: 6 ft 3 in (1.91 m)
- Listed weight: 217 lb (98 kg)

Career information
- High school: East Brady (East Brady, Pennsylvania)
- College: Miami (FL) (1978–1982)
- NFL draft: 1983: 1st round, 14th overall pick

Career history
- Houston Gamblers (1984–1985); Buffalo Bills (1986–1996)

Awards and highlights
- USFL Most Valuable Player (1984); USFL Rookie of the Year (1984); 2× First-team All-USFL (1984, 1985); First-team All-Pro (1991); Second-team All-Pro (1992); 5× Pro Bowl (1987, 1988, 1990–1992); NFL passing touchdowns leader (1991); NFL passer rating leader (1990); NFL completion percentage leader (1990); Second-team All-South Independent (1981); Buffalo Bills Wall of Fame; Buffalo Bills 50th Anniversary Team; Buffalo Bills No. 12 retired; USFL All-Time Team; University of Miami Sports Hall of Fame; NCAA Inspiration Award (2018)

Career NFL statistics
- Passing attempts: 4,779
- Passing completions: 2,874
- Completion percentage: 60.1%
- TD–INT: 237–175
- Passing yards: 35,467
- Passer rating: 84.4
- Stats at Pro Football Reference
- Pro Football Hall of Fame

James Edward Kelly (born February 14, 1960) is an American former professional football quarterback who played in the National Football League (NFL) for 11 seasons with the Buffalo Bills. He also spent two seasons with the Houston Gamblers of the United States Football League (USFL). Kelly played college football for the Miami Hurricanes, earning offensive MVP honors in the 1981 Peach Bowl.

One of the six quarterbacks taken in the first round of the 1983 NFL draft, Kelly was selected 14th overall by the Bills. He chose to sign with the Gamblers instead and did not play for the Bills until the USFL folded in 1986. Employing the "K-Gun" offense, known for its no-huddle shotgun formations, Kelly led one of the greatest NFL scoring juggernauts. From 1990 to 1993, he helped guide the Bills to a record four consecutive Super Bowls, although the team lost each game. Kelly was also named to five Pro Bowls and received first-team All-Pro honors in 1991.

Along with teammates Thurman Thomas and Bruce Smith, Kelly is one of only three players to have his number retired by the Bills. He was inducted to the Pro Football Hall of Fame in 2002.

== Early life ==
Kelly was born in Pittsburgh, Pennsylvania on February 14, 1960. He grew up in East Brady, Pennsylvania.

Kelly was a standout at East Brady High School, winning all-state Pennsylvania honors after passing for 3,915 yards, 44 touchdowns, and one interception in his high school career. After his senior year, Kelly played in the Big 33 Football Classic. Kelly also played basketball in high school, scoring over 1,000 points with six 30-plus-point games. As a senior, he led East Brady to the Pennsylvania Class 'A' basketball state quarterfinals, and averaged 23 points and 20 rebounds.

== College career ==
Kelly was offered a scholarship to play college football at Penn State University under coach Joe Paterno, but Paterno wanted Kelly at linebacker, not quarterback. Miami Hurricanes head coach Lou Saban promised Kelly he would be playing quarterback, which lured Kelly to attend the University of Miami, though Kelly never played for Saban, who left prior to the beginning of the 1979 season. Saban was replaced by Howard Schnellenberger, and Kelly became an important piece in Schnellenberger's effort to build the program into one of the nation's best. Kelly finished his career at the University of Miami with 376 completions in 676 attempts for 5,228 yards and 33 touchdowns. He was inducted into the university's Hall of Fame in 1992.

== Professional career ==
=== 1983 NFL draft ===
Because of fellow quarterback John Elway's well-publicized reluctance to play for the Baltimore Colts, who chose him in the 1983 NFL draft, Kelly's agent asked whether there were any teams he would not play for. Kelly, who disliked cold weather, listed the Minnesota Vikings, Green Bay Packers, and Buffalo Bills. He was pleased to see while watching the 1983 draft on television that the Bills did not select him as the 12th pick in the first round, but learned from his agent that the team had another first-round pick; the Bills chose Kelly as the 14th pick. Although Kelly at the time stated that he had expected the Bills to choose him, he later said, "You have to say those things ... I cried. (Laughs) I didn't really literally cry. I just had tears. I'm like, 'You got to be kidding me.'"

Although he believed that team owner Ralph Wilson would not bring in the right players to build a championship team, Kelly was initially resigned to playing for the Bills, but while meeting with the team to negotiate his contract three days after the draft, a Bills secretary mistakenly let Bruce Allen, general manager of the rival United States Football League's Chicago Blitz, reach Kelly on the telephone; Allen persuaded Kelly to leave the meeting. Then in the first week of May, the Montreal Concordes made a counter-offer on the basis that Kelly's girlfriend lived in Montreal. Kelly's agent, Greg Lustig, would insist on negotiating with the Blitz and the Concordes before doing so with the Bills. By the last week of May, Lustig said he was pleased with the Bills’ proposal and Kelly expected to sign with the Bills, but in the end he would sign with a different USFL team after Ken Weinberger made negotiations during the first week of June.

=== Houston Gamblers ===
Kelly later claimed that the USFL offered him his choice of teams because of the league's interest in signing quarterbacks. He signed with the Houston Gamblers, who played in the climate-controlled Houston Astrodome, and said, "Would you rather be in Houston or Buffalo?"

In two seasons in Houston, leading offensive coach Mouse Davis's run-and-shoot offense, Kelly threw for 9,842 yards, 83 touchdowns, and 45 interceptions with a 63% completion percentage for an average of 8.53 yards per attempt. He was the USFL MVP in 1984, when he set a league record with 5,219 yards passing and 44 touchdown passes. Kelly's USFL records eclipsed those of fellow league quarterbacks Doug Williams and Steve Young. Despite Kelly's success during the regular season, he saw no success during the Gamblers' two playoff appearances. The team was defeated in the first rounds in 1984 and 1985. Kelly threw for a combined 620 yards with two touchdowns and three interceptions.

When the Houston Gamblers folded, Kelly went to the New Jersey Generals and was slated as their starting quarterback. Kelly appeared on a cover of Sports Illustrated while holding a Generals' helmet, but the league collapsed before he ever fielded a snap with the Generals.

==== "The Greatest Game No One Saw" ====
Led by Kelly, the Houston Gamblers took on the Los Angeles Express and quarterback Steve Young, on February 24, 1985. The game was supposed to be televised by ABC, but they opted to cover Doug Flutie's debut with the New Jersey Generals instead. Only cameramen that worked for both teams were on hand to record the game. Houston raced out to an early lead, but the Express mounted a comeback that led to their being ahead, 33–14 with just under ten minutes left in the game. Kelly led the Gamblers on a comeback that would see them pull off a 34–33 win, and in the end, Kelly threw for a professional football record 574 yards breaking the mark of 554 yards set by Norm Van Brocklin in 1951.

Kelly threw three touchdown passes in the last Gambler drives of the game, including what turned out to be the game winner, a 39-yard strike to receiver Ricky Sanders. The Express thought they had the game won, especially after safety Troy West picked off a Kelly pass and returned it 42 yards for a touchdown. The Gamblers got the ball back and it just took two plays for them to score, as Kelly tossed a pass to Richard Johnson that ended up being a 52-yard score. The drive took less than a minute. The Gamblers defense forced a punt, and the offense scored again, this time Kelly found receiver Vince Courville for a 20-yard strike. The drive was aided by a poor punt from Express punter Jeff Partridge that only netted 16 yards and allowed the Gamblers to take over at the Express 43 yard line.

Kelly found Sanders for the go-ahead score, Sanders beating Troy West on the play. West had picked off two Kelly passes that day, but Kelly ended up with the last laugh. The Express were driving to get in range for their placekicker, Tony Zendejas, to kick what had the potential to be the game winner. That was not to be as Young was picked off by Gamblers linebacker Mike Hawkins.

Sports Illustrated described the day as "the greatest game no one saw."

=== Buffalo Bills ===
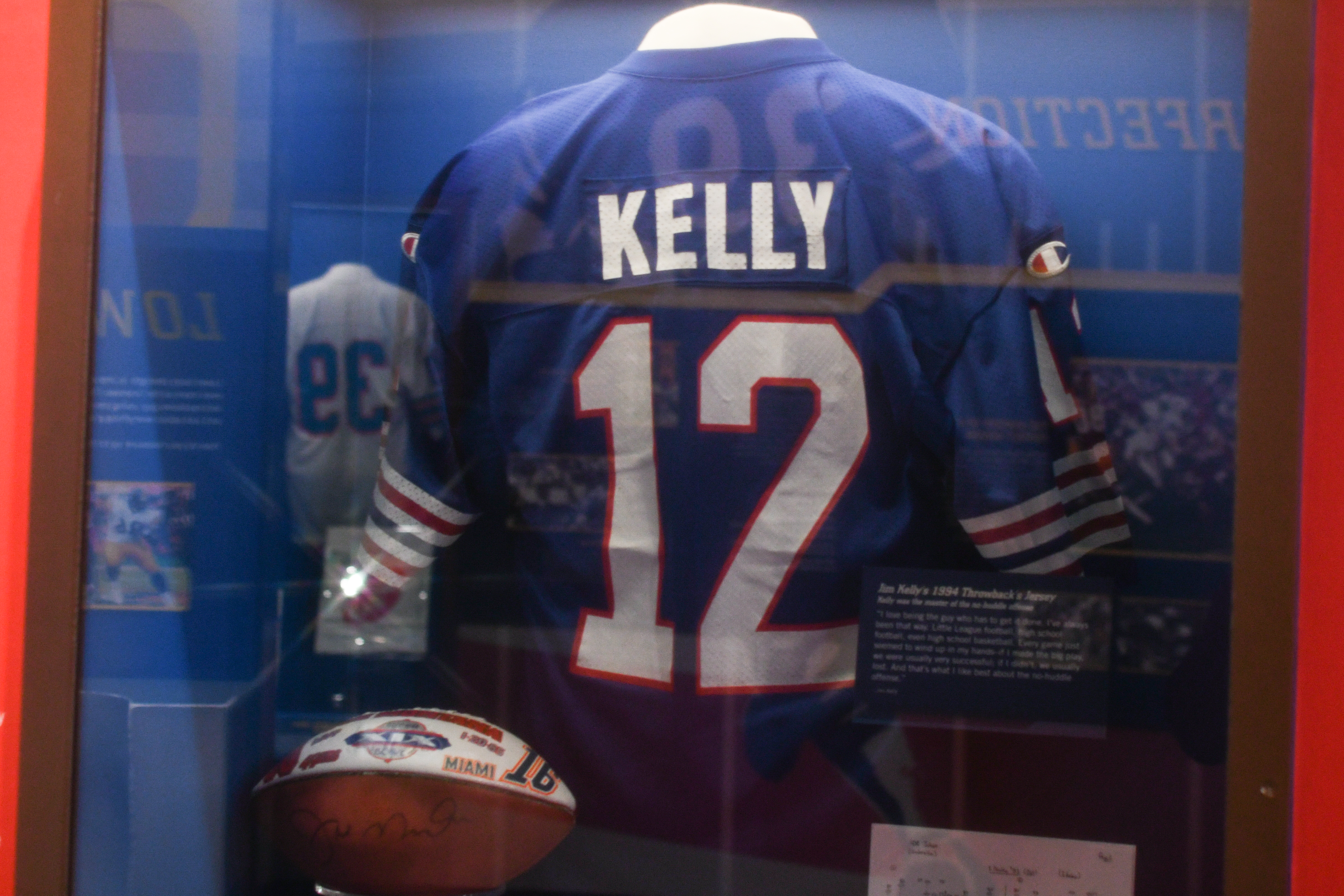
Kelly's #12 Buffalo Bills jersey on display at the Pro Football Hall of Fame

After the USFL folded, Kelly finally joined the Bills, who had retained his NFL rights, in 1986. He helped lead the Bills to four consecutive Super Bowl appearances (Super Bowl XXV–Super Bowl XXVIII) and six divisional championships from 1988 to 1995. The Bills are both the only franchise to reach the Super Bowl four years in a row and lose the Super Bowl four years in a row. Buffalo made the playoffs in eight of Kelly's 11 seasons as their starting quarterback. Kelly's primary 'go-to' wide receiver with the Bills, Andre Reed, ranks among the NFL's all-time leaders in several receiving categories. Kelly and Reed connected for 65 touchdowns during their career together trailing only the tandems of Peyton Manning and Marvin Harrison (112), Tom Brady and Rob Gronkowski (90), Philip Rivers and Antonio Gates (87), Steve Young and Jerry Rice (85), Dan Marino and Mark Clayton (79), Peyton Manning and Reggie Wayne (69), and Drew Brees and Marques Colston (68) for touchdowns by an NFL quarterback and receiver tandem. Kelly, along with Andre Reed, Bruce Smith, Thurman Thomas, and Scott Norwood, was the subject of the 30 for 30 film—Four Falls of Buffalo.

Kelly retired after the 1996 NFL season due to injuries. After sitting out the 1997 season, in 1998 Kelly seriously considered an offer to sign with the Baltimore Ravens who were coached by his former offensive coordinator Ted Marchibroda. Kelly declined the offer due to family reasons and stayed retired; the Ravens instead opted to trade with the Indianapolis Colts for Jim Harbaugh as the latter team prepared for the Peyton Manning era.

==== "No-huddle offense" ====
Kelly ran the Bills' "K-Gun" no-huddle offense, which was a fast-paced offense named after tight end Keith McKeller, that denied opposing defenses the opportunity to make timely substitutions (the NFL later changed the rules in response to this to allow opposing defenses time to change formations under no-huddle situations, but this applied only if the offense made personnel substitutions). This offensive scheme called for multiple formation calls in a huddle, so that after each play was completed, the Bills would eschew a following huddle, instead lining up for the next play where Kelly would read the defense and audible the play. This led to mismatches and defensive communication breakdowns and, in the 1990s, established the Bills as one of the NFL's most successful and dangerous offenses, instrumental in leading Buffalo to four consecutive Super Bowl appearances.

== Career statistics ==
=== College ===
Year	Team	Games		Passing						
Year	Team	GP	Record	Att	Cmp	Pct	Yds	TD	Int	Rtg
1979	Miami	11	5–6	104	48	46.2	721	5	6	108.7
1980	Miami	12	9–3	206	109	52.9	1,519	11	7	125.7
1981	Miami	11	9–2	285	168	59.4	2,403	14	14	136.2
1982	Miami	3	2–1	81	51	63.0	585	3	1	133.4
Career		37	30–15	676	376	55.6	5,228	33	28	128.4

=== USFL ===
==== Regular season ====
Year	Team	Games		Passing							
Year	Team	GP	Record	Cmp	Att	Pct	Yds	Avg	TD	Int	Rtg
1984	Houston Gamblers	18	13–5	370	587	63.0	5,219	8.9	44	26	98.2
1985	Houston Gamblers	18	10–8	360	567	63.5	4,623	8.2	39	19	97.9
Career		36	23–13	730	1,154	63.3	9,842	8.5	83	45	98.0

==== Postseason ====
Year	Team	Games		Passing						
Year	Team	GP	Record	Cmp	Att	Pct	Yds	Avg	TD	Int
1984	Houston Gamblers	1	0–1	23	34	67.6	301	8.6	0	2
1985	Houston Gamblers	1	0–1	23	40	57.5	319	7.8	2	1
Career		2	0–2	46	74	62.2	620	8.4	2	3

=== NFL ===
==== Regular season ====
Legend
	Led the league
**Bold**	Career high

Year	Team	Games			Passing								Rushing					Sacked		Fumbles	
Year	Team	GP	GS	Record	Cmp	Att	Pct	Yds	Y/A	TD	Int	Rtg	Att	Yds	Y/A	Lng	TD	Sck	SckY	Fum	Lost
1986	BUF	16	16	4–12	285	**480**	59.4	3,593	7.5	22	17	83.3	**41**	**199**	**4.9**	20	0	**43**	**330**	7	3
1987	BUF	12	12	6–6	250	419	59.7	2,798	6.7	19	11	83.8	29	133	4.6	**24**	0	27	239	6	3
1988	BUF	16	16	12–4	269	452	59.5	3,380	7.5	15	17	78.2	35	154	4.4	20	0	30	229	5	3
1989	BUF	13	13	6–7	228	391	58.3	3,130	8.0	25	18	86.2	29	137	4.7	19	**2**	30	216	6	4
1990	BUF	14	14	12–2	219	346	63.3	2,829	**8.2**	24	9	**101.2**	22	63	2.9	15	0	20	158	4	2
1991	BUF	15	15	**13–2**	**304**	474	**64.1**	**3,844**	8.1	**33**	17	97.6	20	45	2.3	12	1	31	227	6	4
1992	BUF	16	16	11–5	269	462	58.2	3,457	7.5	23	**19**	81.2	31	53	1.7	10	1	20	145	8	4
1993	BUF	16	16	12–4	288	470	61.3	3,382	7.2	18	18	79.9	36	102	2.8	17	0	25	171	7	3
1994	BUF	14	14	7–7	285	448	63.6	3,114	7.0	22	17	84.6	25	77	3.1	18	1	34	244	**11**	**6**
1995	BUF	15	15	10–5	255	458	55.7	3,130	6.8	22	13	81.1	17	20	1.2	17	0	26	181	7	4
1996	BUF	13	13	8–5	222	379	58.6	2,810	7.4	14	**19**	73.2	19	66	3.5	22	**2**	37	287	9	4
Career		160	160	101–59	2,874	4,779	60.1	35,467	7.4	237	175	84.4	304	1,049	3.5	24	7	323	2,427	76	40

==== Postseason ====
Year	Team	Games			Passing								Rushing					Sacked		Fumbles	
Year	Team	GP	GS	Record	Cmp	Att	Pct	Yds	Y/A	TD	Int	Rtg	Att	Yds	Y/A	Lng	TD	Sck	SckY	Fum	Lost
1988	BUF	2	2	1–1	33	63	52.4	407	6.5	1	4	51.5	5	28	**5.6**	10	0	4	34	0	0
1989	BUF	1	1	0–1	28	54	51.9	405	7.5	4	2	85.8	1	5	5.0	5	0	1	1	0	0
1990	BUF	3	3	2–1	54	82	65.9	**851**	**10.4**	**5**	2	**110.4**	**13**	**72**	5.5	**16**	0	1	7	2	0
1991	BUF	3	3	2–1	64	**118**	54.2	665	5.6	**5**	**9**	53.1	6	27	4.5	10	0	**7**	**59**	**3**	**1**
1992	BUF	2	2	**1–1**	21	31	**67.7**	259	8.4	1	4	64.5	3	4	1.3	4	0	3	11	1	**1**
1993	BUF	3	3	2–1	**75**	114	65.8	707	6.2	2	1	84.9	9	10	1.1	8	0	6	40	1	0
1995	BUF	2	2	1–1	26	51	51.0	330	6.5	2	5	45.0	3	-3	-1.0	-1	0	2	6	1	0
1996	BUF	1	1	0–1	21	32	65.6	239	7.5	1	1	85.3	4	18	4.5	15	0	1	10	2	**1**
Career		17	17	9–8	322	545	59.1	3,863	7.1	21	28	72.3	44	161	3.7	16	0	25	168	10	3

==== Super Bowl ====
Year	SB	Team	Opp.	Passing								Rushing				Result
Year	SB	Team	Opp.	Cmp	Att	Pct	Yds	Y/A	TD	Int	Rtg	Att	Yds	Y/A	TD	Result
1990	XXV	BUF	NYG	18	30	60.0	212	7.1	0	0	**81.5**	**6**	**23**	3.8	0	L 20–19
1991	XXVI	BUF	WAS	28	**58**	48.3	**275**	4.7	**2**	**4**	44.8	3	16	5.3	0	L 37–24
1992	XXVII	BUF	DAL	4	7	57.1	82	**11.7**	0	2	58.9	0	0	0.0	0	L 52–17
1993	XXVIII	BUF	DAL	31	50	**62.0**	260	5.2	0	1	67.1	2	12	**6.0**	0	L 30–13
Career				81	145	55.9	829	5.7	2	7	56.9	11	51	4.6	0	W−L 0–4

== Awards and honors ==
- USFL Most Valuable Player (1984)
- USFL Rookie of the Year (1984)
- 2× First-team All-USFL (1984, 1985)
- First-team All-Pro (1991)
- Second-team All-Pro (1992)
- 5× Pro Bowl (1987, 1988, 1990–1992)
- NFL passing touchdowns leader (1991)
- NFL passer rating leader (1990)
- NFL completion percentage leader (1990)
- Second-team All-South Independent (1981)
- Buffalo Bills Wall of Fame
- Buffalo Bills 50th Anniversary Team
- Buffalo Bills No. 12 retired
- USFL All-Time Team
- University of Miami Sports Hall of Fame
- NCAA Inspiration Award (2018)

== Records ==
Kelly's Houston Gamblers USFL jersey on display at the Pro Football Hall of Fame

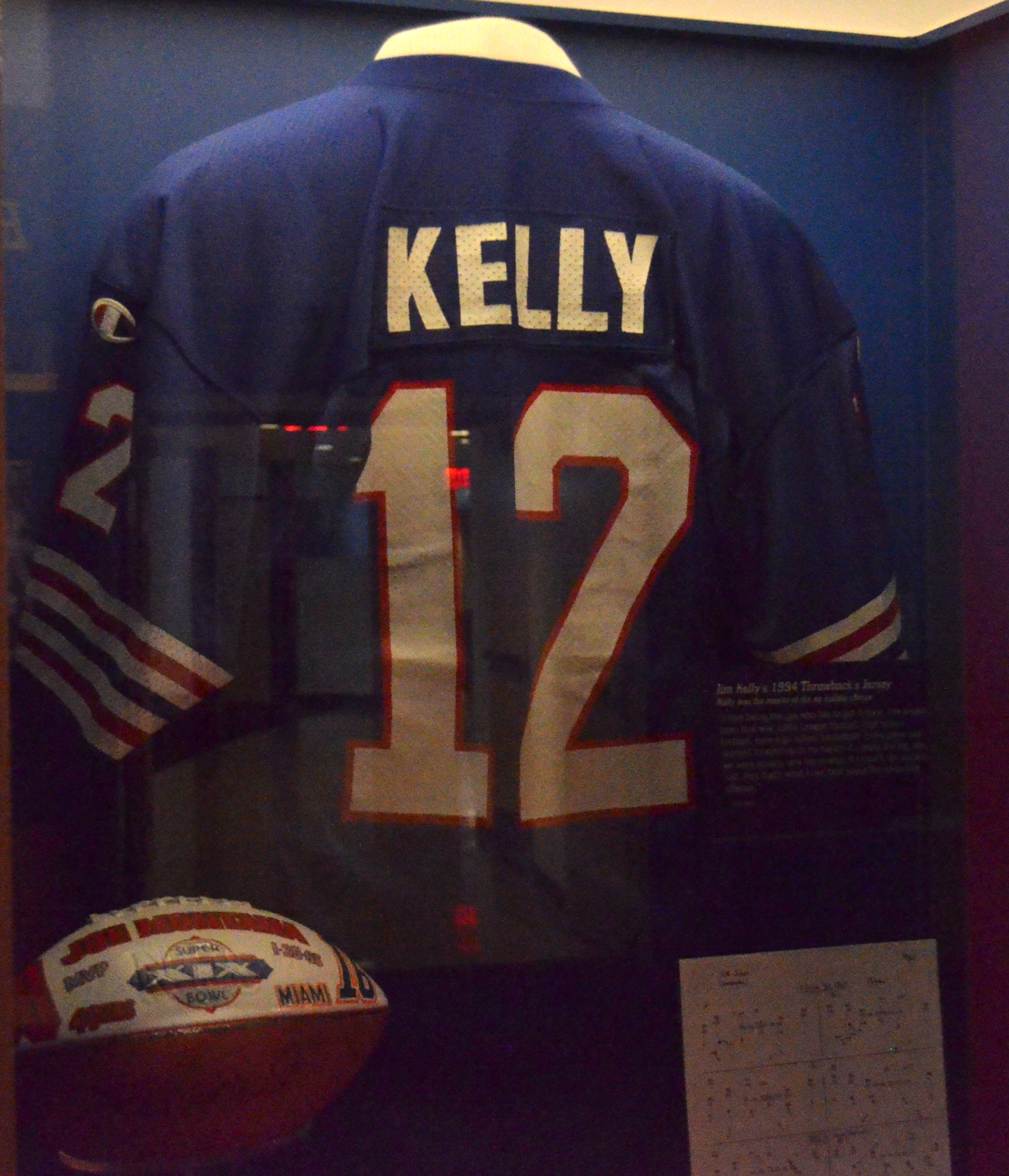
Kelly's Buffalo Bills jersey on display at the Pro Football Hall of Fame

Kelly holds the second all-time NFL record for most yards gained per completion in a single game (44), established on September 10, 1995, in the Bills' game against the expansion Carolina Panthers. He recorded an NFL-best 101.2 passer rating in 1990, led the league with 33 touchdown passes in 1991, (which remained a Bills record until 2020 when it was broken by Josh Allen) and made the Pro Bowl five times (1987, 1988, 1990, 1991, and 1992).

In his four Super Bowls, Kelly completed 81 of 145 passes for 829 yards and two touchdowns, with seven interceptions. His 81 completions are the fifth most in Super Bowl history behind Tom Brady, Peyton Manning, Kurt Warner, and Joe Montana. In Super Bowl XXVI, he set a record with 58 pass attempts, and in Super Bowl XXVIII he set a record with 31 completions (this was later surpassed).

Kelly finished his 11 NFL seasons with 2,874 completions in 4,779 attempts for 35,467 yards, 237 touchdowns, and 175 interceptions, all of which are Buffalo records excluding the interceptions. He also rushed for 1,049 yards and seven touchdowns.

Including his time in the NFL and USFL, he finished with over 45,000 passing yards and 320 touchdowns. In 2001, the Buffalo Bills retired his number 12 jersey.

On August 3, 2002, Kelly was inducted into the Pro Football Hall of Fame. He was enshrined during his first year of eligibility and headlined a class that also featured John Stallworth, Dan Hampton, Dave Casper, and George Allen. Fellow Hall of Fame member and former head coach Marv Levy was Kelly's presenter at the ceremony.

Up until the 2024 NFL season, Kelly was the most recent starting quarterback to lose his Super Bowl debut and return to start a subsequent Super Bowl, with Jalen Hurts being the most recent to achieve this.

== Personal life ==
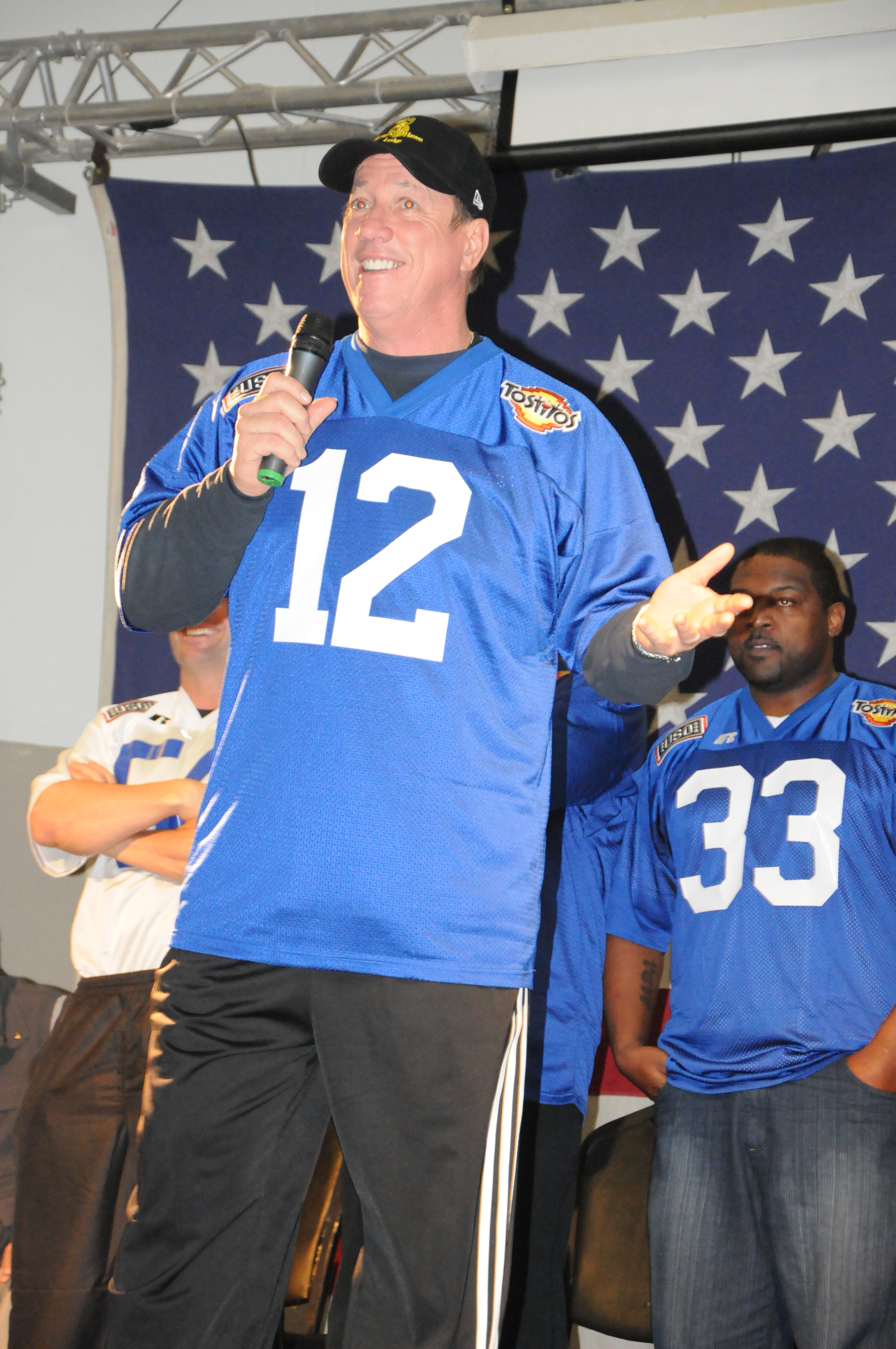
Kelly at Balad Air Base in Balad, Iraq in 2010

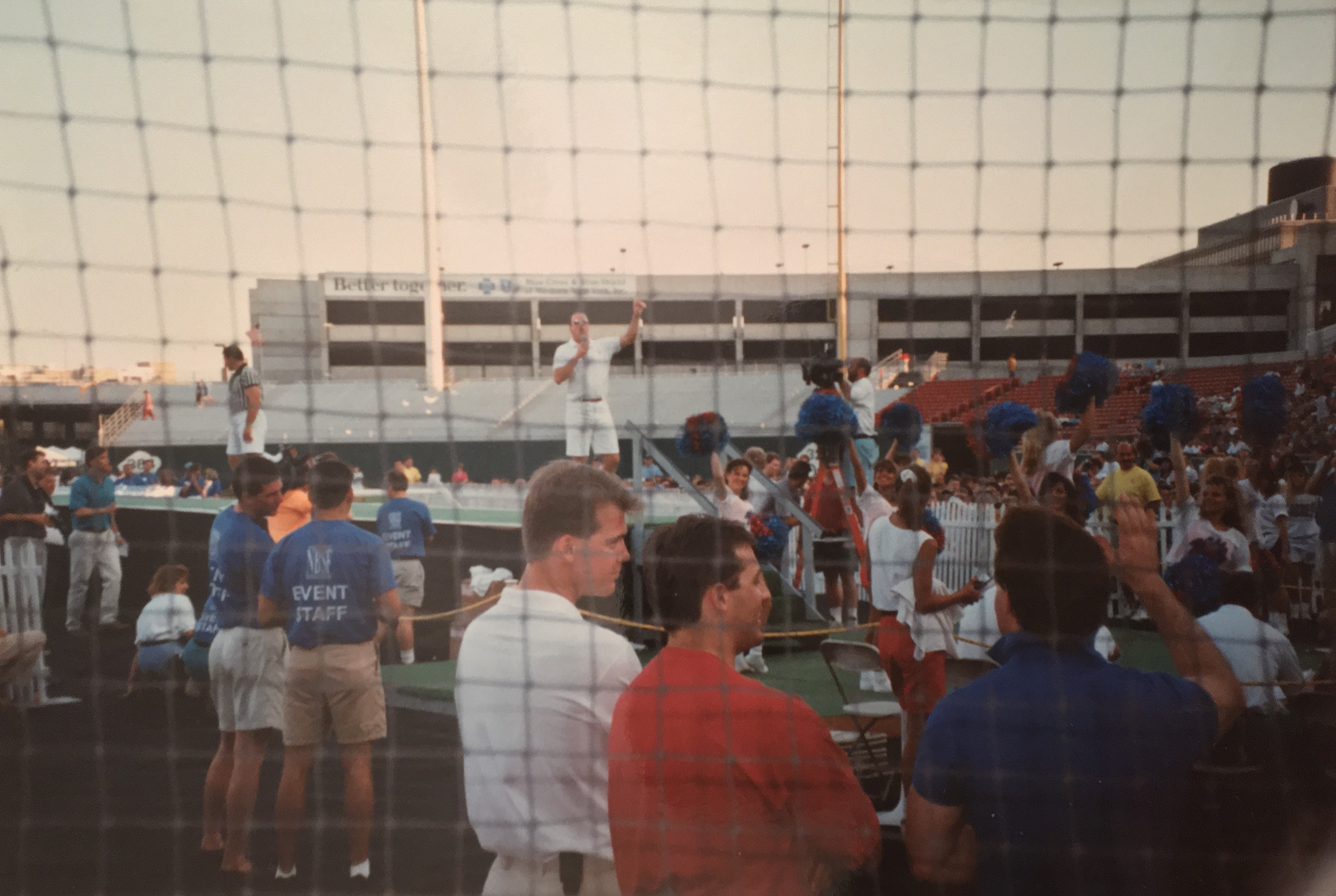
Kelly speaking during StarGaze 1993 at Pilot Field in Buffalo

Kelly resides in East Aurora, New York with his wife Jill and their two daughters.

Kelly devoted much of his post-football life to his son, Hunter James Kelly, who was diagnosed with globoid-cell leukodystrophy (Krabbe disease) shortly after his birth on February 14, 1997, which was Kelly's 37th birthday. Hunter died as a result of this disease on August 5, 2005, at the age of 8. To honor his son, Kelly established Hunter's Hope, a non-profit organization, in 1997. Kelly's advocacy on behalf of Krabbe patients has increased national awareness of the disease. He and his wife Jill founded the annual Hunter's Day of Hope, which is held on February 14, the birthdays of both Jim and Hunter Kelly. The Hunter James Kelly Research Institute was founded at the University at Buffalo in 2004, where neuroscientists and clinicians are studying myelin and its diseases. When Kelly was inducted into the Pro Football Hall of Fame in 2002, he dedicated his speech to Hunter. "It's been written that the trademark of my career was toughness," he said as he choked back tears. "The toughest person I ever met in my life was my hero, my soldier, my son, Hunter. I love you, buddy."

Two of Kelly's nephews, both the sons of his younger brother Kevin, have also played quarterback. Chad Kelly played college football at the NCAA Division I level for the Clemson Tigers and the Ole Miss Rebels and took part in the 2017 NFL draft, in which he was selected last overall in the seventh round by the Denver Broncos, earning the title of "Mr. Irrelevant." He now plays for the Toronto Argonauts of the CFL and won the Grey Cup with them in 2022. Casey Kelly, Chad's younger brother, played quarterback for Mallard Creek High School, and graduated in 2019. Casey Kelly also enrolled at Ole Miss, but chose to convert to tight end and play for the team as a walk-on. Casey Kelly then entered the transfer portal in 2023 to play for Oregon, then invoked a graduate transfer to play for East Carolina in 2024.

Kelly's father, Joe Kelly, died on August 21, 2017; his mother had died in 1996.

Kelly is a devout Christian, and has several business ventures, including Hall of Fame Life Promotions, a promotional company that is committed to donating a percentage of all of its proceeds to the Hunter's Hope Foundation. In 2011, Kelly founded Jim Kelly Inc. a company which produces the MyFanClip line of all-purpose clips which bear sports team logos and other insignia. MyFanClip has licensing agreements with the NFL, MLB, NHL and NASCAR. Proceeds also benefit the Hunter's Hope Foundation, his charity.

Kelly has hosted the annual Jim Kelly Celebrity Golf Classic golf tournament since 1987 to benefit his Kelly for Kids Foundation. A public charity function called StarGaze was held from 1992 to 1995 to complement the golf tournament.

Since 1988, Kelly has run a football camp for youths between the ages of eight and 18 at the Buffalo Bills facilities. It started with 325 campers in its first year, growing to over 500 campers a year. This camp provides teaching from experienced coaches and previous players from all over the country. Kelly also participates in various drills with the participants.

Kelly owned and operated Sport City Grill restaurant with the attached Network nightclub on the ground floor of Main Place Tower in Buffalo from 1993 to 1996.

On June 3, 2013, Kelly announced that he had been diagnosed with squamous cell carcinoma, a form of cancer, in his upper jaw. He underwent surgery at a Buffalo hospital on June 7. Kelly reported to news outlets shortly after his surgery that the procedure was successful and he was now cancer-free. On March 14, 2014, after a follow-up test at the Erie County Medical Center, it was announced that Kelly's cancer had recurred, and that he would begin radiation and chemotherapy treatment. It was announced on August 20, 2014, that doctors could no longer find evidence of cancer.

On November 1, 2014, Kelly announced he had contracted MRSA within his bones, three months after being declared cancer-free. A few weeks after the announcement, Kelly said he was MRSA-free.

Kelly announced in March 2018 that the cancer had returned. He underwent surgery that month to remove the cancer and reconstruct his upper jaw. In June 2018, it was announced that Kelly would receive the Jimmy V Award for Perseverance at the 2018 ESPYs. In late June 2018, Kelly returned to a New York City hospital for additional surgery.

On January 18, 2019, Jim Kelly announced on Instagram that he was cancer free.

Kelly suffered a stroke in early May 2026; he had largely recovered by late June, when he noted that other than some aging-related issues with eyesight and hearing, he was in relatively good health.

== See also ==
- List of most wins by a National Football League starting quarterback
- List of Super Bowl losing quarterbacks
- List of gridiron football quarterbacks passing statistics
