= Four Falls of Buffalo =

2015 television film

- Directed by: Ken Rodgers
- Starring: Jim Kelly; Bruce Smith; Thurman Thomas; Andre Reed; Don Beebe; Darryl Talley; Steve Tasker; Frank Reich; Marv Levy; Bill Polian
- Narrated by: William Fichtner
- Country of origin: United States
- Original language: English

Production
- Producer: Michelle Girardi Zumwalt
- Running time: 100 minutes

Original release
- Network: ESPN
- Release: December 12, 2015

Four Falls of Buffalo is a 2015 documentary film produced for ESPN's 30 for 30 series and directed by Ken Rodgers of NFL Films. The film profiles the Buffalo Bills teams of the early 1990s, when the franchise became the first team to play in—and lose—four consecutive Super Bowls.

The film goes through the Bills four "Super Bowl" years featuring retrospectives and insight on such famous plays as Scott Norwood's 47-yard field goal miss at the end of Super Bowl XXV, Thurman Thomas' misplaced helmet at the start of Super Bowl XXVI, and Don Beebe's strip of Leon Lett's attempted fumble return in Super Bowl XXVII. Former Bills players Jim Kelly, Bruce Smith, Thurman Thomas, Andre Reed, Don Beebe, Darryl Talley, Steve Tasker, Scott Norwood, Frank Reich, coach Marv Levy, and general manager Bill Polian all gave extensive interviews for the film.

A highlight of the documentary is an emotional interview with Norwood and former Bills special teams coach Bruce DeHaven conducted on the steps of Buffalo City Hall, the site where, twenty-five years before, the crowd of Bills fans had cheered for Norwood following his ill-fated kick.

== Cast ==
- Jim Kelly
- Bruce Smith
- Thurman Thomas
- Andre Reed
- Scott Norwood
- Steve Tasker
- Don Beebe
- Frank Reich
- Kenneth Davis
- Darryl Talley
- Marv Levy
- Bill Polian
- Bruce DeHaven
- Bill Belichick
- Chris Berman
- Tim Russert (via archival footage)
- Luke Russert
- John Elway
- Troy Aikman
- Joe Gibbs
- Jimmy Johnson
- Andrea Kremer
- William Fichtner (Narrator)

== Awards ==
Four Falls of Buffalo was nominated for the Outstanding Long Sports Documentary at the 37th Annual Sports Emmy Awards.

== See also ==
- List of American football films
