= 1981 All-South Independent football team =

American college football season

The 1981 All-South Independent football team consists of American football players chosen by the Associated Press for their All-South independent teams for the 1981 NCAA Division I-A football season.

== Offense ==
Quarterback

- Reggie Collier, Southern Mississippi (AP-1)
- Jim Kelly, Miami (AP-2)

Running backs

- Barry Redden, Richmond (AP-1)
- Cyrus Lawrence, Virginia Tech (AP-1)
- Sammy Winder, Southern Mississippi (AP-1)
- Marvin Lewis, Tulane (AP-2)
- Michael Whiting, Florida State (AP-2)
- Johnnie Wright, South Carolina (AP-2)

Wide receivers

- Larry Brodsky, Miami (AP-1)
- Alfred Kinney, Northeast Louisiana (AP-2)
- Mike Giacolone, Virginia Tech (AP-2)

Tight end

- Rodney Holman, Tulane (AP-1)
- Sam Childers, Florida State (AP-2)

Offensive linemen

- Barry Voltapetti, Florida State (AP-1)
- Tootie Robbins, East Carolina (AP-1)
- Chuck Slaughter, South Carolina (AP-1)
- Wally Browne, Virginia Tech (AP-1)
- Frank Frazier, Miami (AP-2)
- Glen Howe, Southern Mississippi (AP-2)
- Joe Doyle, South Carolina (AP-2)
- Jimmy Chandler, Northeast Louisiana (AP-2)

Center

- Tom McCormick, Florida State (AP-1)
- Arthur Christophe, Northeast Louisiana (AP-2)

== Defense ==
Defensive ends

- George Tillman, Southern Mississippi (AP-1)
- Jarvis Coursey, Florida State (AP-1)
- Rhett Whilley, Southern Mississippi (AP-2)
- Jody Schulz, East Carolina (AP-2)

Defensive tackles

- Lester Williams, Miami (AP-1)
- Andrew Provence, South Carolina (AP-1)
- Emanuel Weaver, South Carolina (AP-1)
- Jearld Baylis, Southern Mississippi (AP-1)
- Garry Futch, Florida State (AP-2)
- Brian Douglas, Tulane (AP-2)
- Tony Chickillo, Miami (AP-2)

Linebackers

- Ashley Lee, Virginia Tech (AP-1)
- Scott Nicolas, Miami (AP-1)
- Ricky Sanders, Northeast Louisiana (AP-2)
- Gene Hagen, Louisville (AP-2)

Defensive backs

- Fred Marion, Miami (AP-1)
- Leon Williams, Louisville (AP-1)
- Jody Norman, Northeast Louisiana (AP-1)
- Bud Brown, Southern Mississippi (AP-2)
- Frank Minnifield, Louisville (AP-2)
- James Harris, Florida State (AP-2)

== Special teams ==
Kicker

- Dan Miller, Miami (AP-1)
- Don Wake, Virginia Tech (AP-2)

Punter

- Rohn Stark, Florida State (AP-1)
- Chris Norman, South Carolina (AP-2)
