= List of NFL quarterbacks by teams beaten =

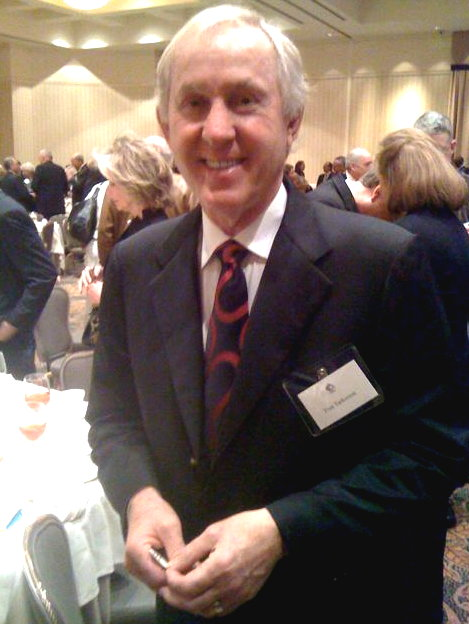
Fran Tarkenton was the first quarterback to beat every NFL team

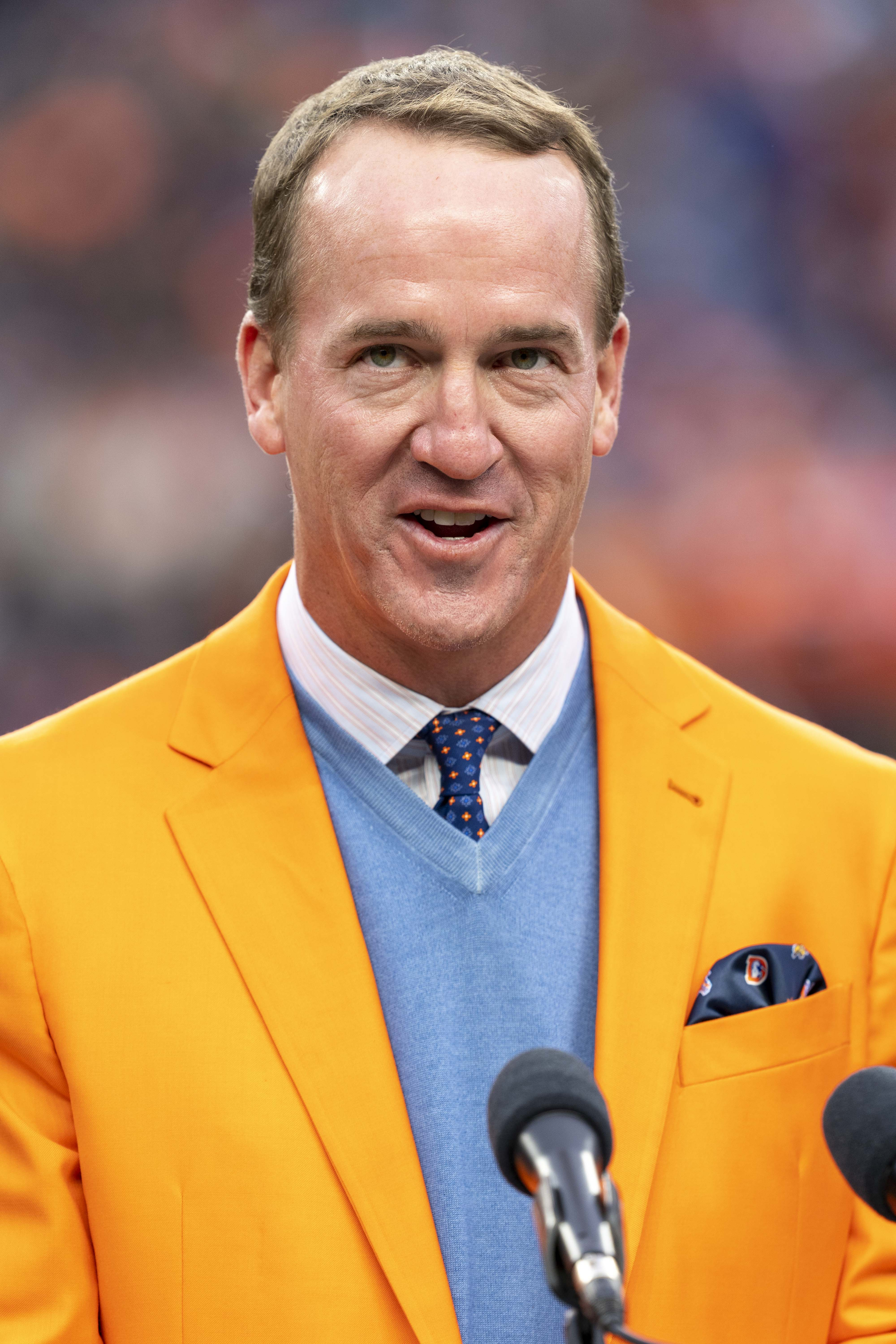
Peyton Manning beat all NFL teams after free agency landed him in Denver.

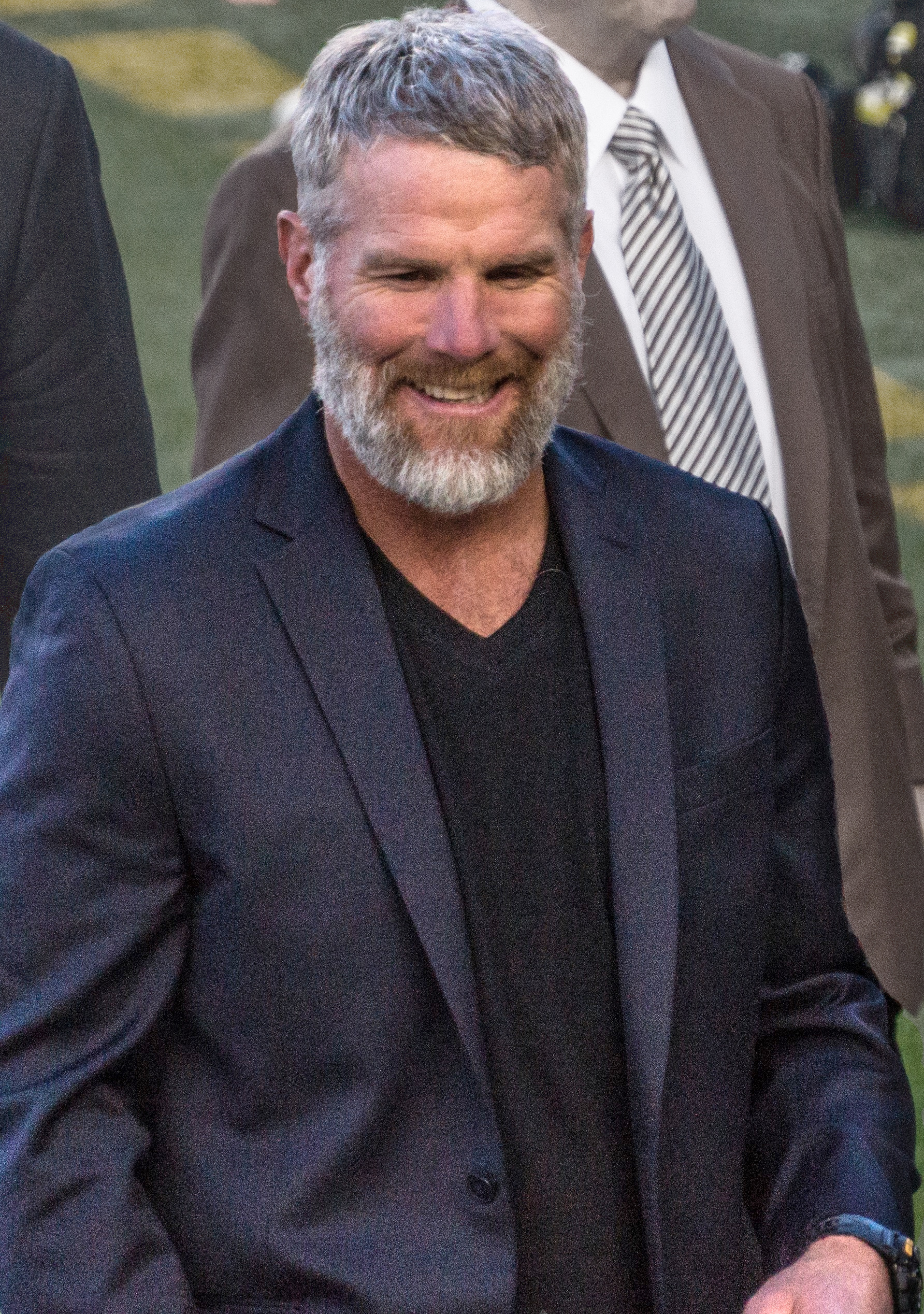
Brett Favre played for 4 teams while earning a win against all 32 NFL franchises.

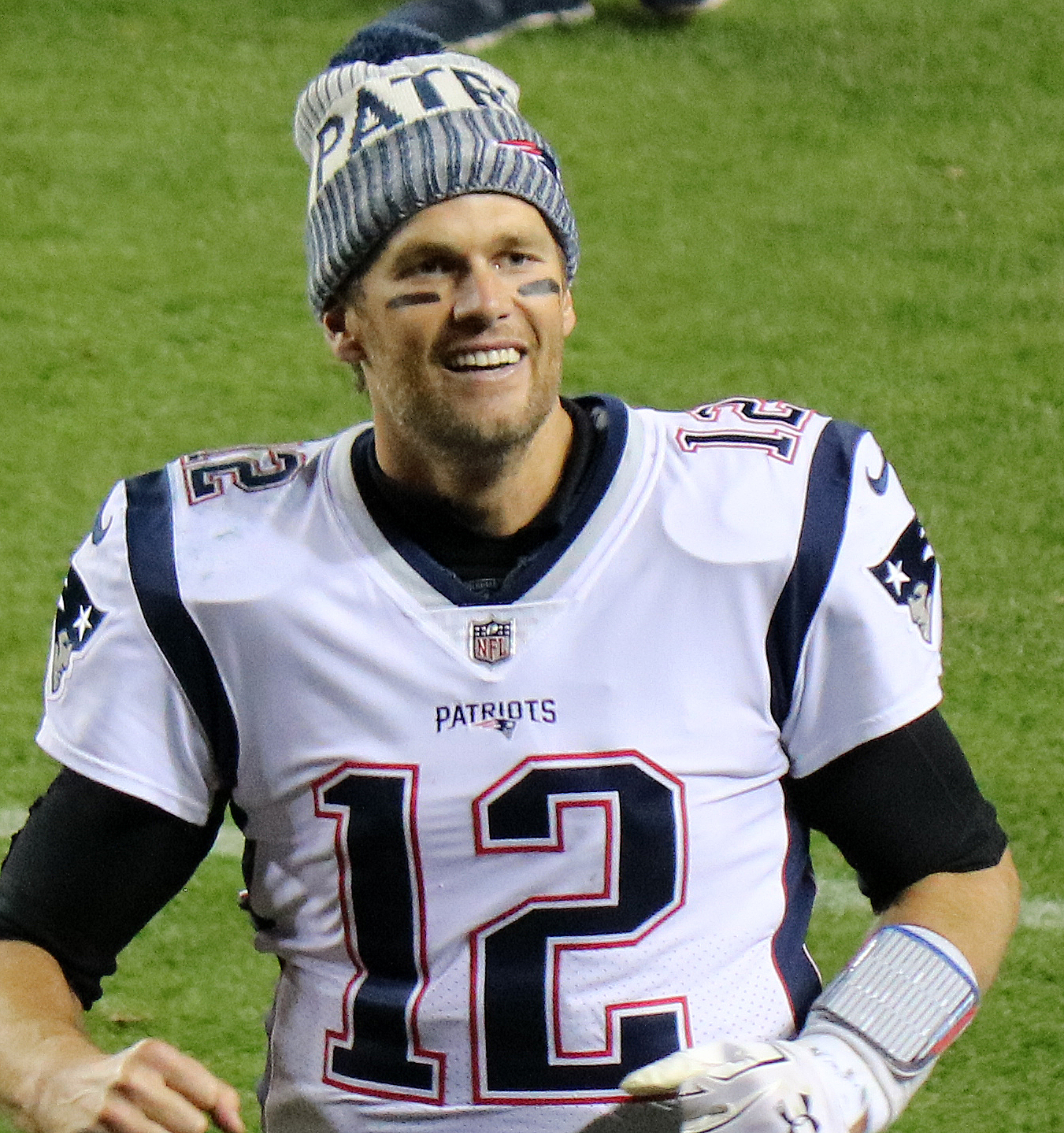
Tom Brady finished beating every NFL team after his free agent move from New England to Tampa Bay.

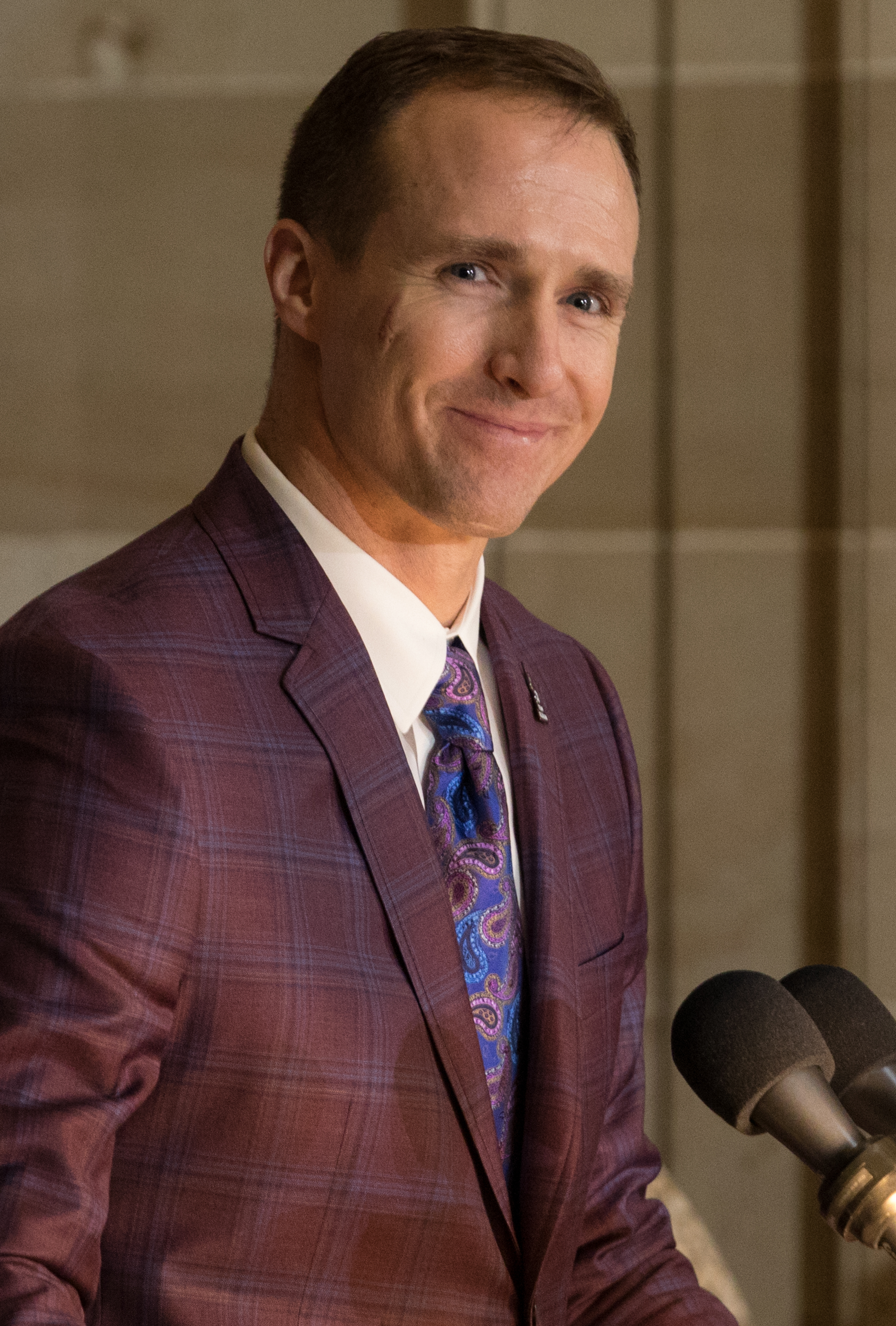
Drew Brees beat the Saints early in his career and spent his last 15 years with New Orleans beating every other team.

A starting NFL quarterback is the only player who receives credit for his team's wins and losses. There have been a select few who have beaten every team they faced. Also, if a quarterback plays for more than one team, there is a possibility he can beat every team in the league. This is a list of the number of teams each quarterback has won a game against in both regular season and playoffs, along with a list of the teams he did not beat in his career. Note that the list of teams not beaten includes only franchises that were active during the player's playing years.

== Teams beaten by quarterback ==
Key
^ Inducted into the Pro Football Hall of Fame
* Active player

The source for this list is the Pro Football Reference web site.

Player	No. of teams beaten	Teams not beaten	ref
Quarterback beat every team
Tom Brady	32		
Drew Brees^	32		
Brett Favre^	32		
Peyton Manning^	32		
Joe Montana^	28	^{[28 teams]}	
Fran Tarkenton^	28	^{[28 teams]}	
Quarterback beat all teams but one
Kerry Collins	31	Miami Dolphins	
Joe Flacco*	31	Seattle Seahawks	
Patrick Mahomes*	31	Kansas City Chiefs	
Aaron Rodgers*	31	Green Bay Packers	
Ben Roethlisberger	31	Pittsburgh Steelers	
Alex Smith	31	Kansas City Chiefs	
Matthew Stafford*	31	Pittsburgh Steelers	
Russell Wilson	31	Seattle Seahawks	
John Elway^	30	Denver Broncos ^{[31 teams]}	
Terry Bradshaw^	27	Pittsburgh Steelers ^{[28 teams]}	
Ken Stabler^	27	Oakland Raiders ^{[28 teams]}	
Quarterback beat all teams but two
Troy Aikman^	29	Dallas Cowboys ^{[31 teams]} Baltimore Ravens	
Josh Allen*	30	Buffalo Bills; Philadelphia Eagles	
Kirk Cousins*	30	Cincinnati Bengals; Kansas City Chiefs	
Boomer Esiason	29	Carolina Panthers ^{[31 teams]} San Francisco 49ers	
Joe Ferguson	26	Buffalo Bills ^{[28 teams]} Seattle Seahawks	
Jared Goff	30	Buffalo Bills; Pittsburgh Steelers	

- ^{28 teams} Players who retired before 1995 had only 28 teams to compete against.
- ^{31 teams} The Houston Texans first season was after Elway, Aikman, and Esiason retired,
  so they had only 31 teams to compete against.
