= List of NFL quarterback records =

This is a list of the records in the National Football League (NFL) set by individual quarterbacks. For NFL records set by players in other positions, see List of NFL individual records.

== Playing ==
- Most seasons: 26, George Blanda, 1949–1958, 1960–1975
- Most games played: 335, Tom Brady, 2001–2007; 2009–2022
- Most consecutive starts: 297 (321 including playoffs), Brett Favre, 1992–2010
- Most consecutive starts to begin a career: 208 (227 including playoffs) Peyton Manning, 1998–2011

== Passing ==
=== Passer rating ===
- Most seasons led league: 6, Sammy Baugh, 1937, 1940, 1943, 1945, 1948, 1949; Steve Young, 1991–1994, 1996–1997
- Most consecutive seasons led league: 4, Steve Young, 1991–1994
- Highest passer rating, career (minimum 1,500 attempts): 105.6, Brock Purdy, 2022-2026
- Highest passer rating, season (minimum 100 attempts): 122.5, Aaron Rodgers, 2011
- Highest passer rating, rookie, season: 104.9, Dak Prescott, 2016
- Youngest player, 158.3 perfect passer rating, game: Marcus Mariota (21 years, 318 days), September 13, 2015
- Oldest player, 158.3 perfect passer rating, game: Tom Brady (43 years, 145 days), December 26, 2020
- Most games, 100+ passer rating, career: 156, Tom Brady, 2001–2022
- Most games, 120+ passer rating, career: 63, Drew Brees, 2002–2020
- Most games, 130+ passer rating, career: 41, Drew Brees, 2002–2020; Aaron Rodgers, 2005–2024
- Most games, 140+ passer rating, career: 22, Tom Brady, 2001–2022
- Most games, 150+ passer rating, career: 8, Drew Brees, 2002–2020; Ben Roethlisberger, 2004–2018; Lamar Jackson, 2018-2024
- Most games, 158.3 perfect passer rating, career: 4, Lamar Jackson, 2018–2024 Tied with Ben Roethlisberger
- Most games, 100+ passer rating, season: 14, Aaron Rodgers, 2020
- Most games, 120+ passer rating, season: 10, Aaron Rodgers, 2020
- Most games, 130+ passer rating, season: 7, Lamar Jackson, 2024
- Most games, 140+ passer rating, season: 5, Lamar Jackson, 2024
- Most games, 150+ passer rating, season: 3, Roger Staubach, 1973; Kirk Cousins, 2015; Drew Brees, 2018; Jared Goff, 2024; Lamar Jackson, 2024
- Most games, 158.3 perfect passer rating, season: 2, Ben Roethlisberger, 2007; Lamar Jackson, 2019
- Most seasons, 100+ passer rating (minimum 10 games started): 9, Drew Brees, 2004, 2009, 2011, 2013, 2015–2019; Aaron Rodgers, 2009-2014, 2016, 2020-2021
- Most seasons, 120+ passer rating (minimum 10 games started): 2, Aaron Rodgers, 2011, 2020

=== Passing attempts ===
- Most seasons led league: 5, Dan Marino, 1984, 1986, 1988, 1992, 1997
- Most consecutive seasons led league: 3, Johnny Unitas, 1959–1961; George Blanda, 1963–1965; Drew Bledsoe, 1994–1996
- Most pass attempts, career: 12,050, Tom Brady, 2000–2022
- Most pass attempts, season: 733, Tom Brady, 2022
- Most pass attempts, rookie, season: 627, Andrew Luck, 2012
- Most pass attempts, game: 70, Drew Bledsoe, November 13, 1994 (OT)
- Most pass attempts, regulation game: 69, Vinny Testaverde, December 24, 2000
- Most pass attempts per game, career: 38.3, Andrew Luck, 2012-2018
- Most pass attempts per game, season: 45.44, Matthew Stafford, (727 attempts/16 games), 2012
- Most pass attempts, game, perfect passer rating (158.3): 33, Jared Goff, September 27, 2018; Deshaun Watson, October 6, 2019
- Most seasons, 500+ pass attempts: 17, Tom Brady, 2002–2022
- Most seasons, 550+ pass attempts: 14, Tom Brady; 2002, 2007, 2009, 2011–2015, 2017–2022

=== Pass completions ===
- Most seasons led league: 6, Dan Marino; 1984–1986, 1988, 1992, 1997; Drew Brees; 2007–2008, 2011, 2014, 2016–2017
- Most consecutive seasons led league: 3, George Blanda, 1963–1965, Dan Marino, 1984–1986
- Most pass completions, career: 7,753, Tom Brady, 2000–2022
- Most pass completions, season: 490, Tom Brady, 2022
- Most pass completions per game, career: 25.1, Joe Burrow, 2020-2026
- Most pass completions per game, season: 29.4, Drew Brees, 2016
- Most pass completions, rookie, season: 396, Justin Herbert, 2020
- Most pass completions, rookie, game: 37, Joe Burrow on Sep 17, 2020; Justin Herbert on Nov 22, 2020
- Most seasons 300+ completions: 18, Tom Brady, 2000–2022; Brett Favre, 1992–2009
- Most seasons 350+ completions: 14, Tom Brady, 2002–2022
- Most seasons 400+ completions: 9, Drew Brees, 2007–2008, 2010–2016
- Most consecutive seasons 300+ completions: 18, Brett Favre, 1992–2009
- Most consecutive seasons 350+ completions: 13, Drew Brees, 2006–2018
- Most consecutive seasons 400+ completions: 7, Drew Brees, 2010–2016
- Most pass completions, playoff game: 47, Ben Roethlisberger, 01-10-2021
- Most pass completions, regulation game, regular season: 47, Jacoby Brissett, Nov 16, 2025
- Most pass completions, game, perfect passer rating (158.3): 28, Deshaun Watson, Oct 6, 2019
- Most consecutive pass completions: 25, Ryan Tannehill, Oct 18–25, 2015 (last 7 completions on October 18, 2015; first 18 completions on October 25, 2015); Nick Foles, December 30, 2018, Philip Rivers, November 25, 2018

=== Pass completion percentage ===
- Most seasons led league: 8, Len Dawson; 1962, 1964–1969, 1975
- Most consecutive seasons led league: 6, Len Dawson, 1964–1969
- Highest completion percentage, career (minimum 1,500 attempts): 68.5, Joe Burrow (1,921 passing completions/2,806 attempts), 2020–2025
- Highest completion percentage, season (among qualified players): 74.44, Drew Brees, (364/489), 2018
- Highest completion percentage, rookie, season: 67.76, Dak Prescott, (311/459), 2016
- Highest completion percentage, regular season game (minimum 20 attempts): 96.67, Drew Brees, (29/30), December 16, 2019
- Most games with at least 80% pass completion rate, career (minimum 20 attempts per game): 28, Drew Brees, 2004–2020
- Most games with at least 80% pass completion rate, season (minimum 20 attempts per game): 4, Drew Brees, 2018; Kirk Cousins, 2019; Trevor Lawrence, 2022
- Most games with at least 80% pass completion rate and no interceptions, career (minimum 20 passes per game): 26, Drew Brees, 2004–2020
- Most games with at least 80% pass completion rate and no interceptions, season (minimum 20 passes per game): 4, Drew Brees, 2018; Kirk Cousins, 2019
- Most games with at least 75% pass completion rate, career (minimum 20 attempts per game): 67, Drew Brees, 2004–2020
- Most games with at least 75% pass completion rate, season (minimum 20 attempts per game): 8, Tom Brady, 2007
- Most games with at least 75% pass completion rate and no interceptions, career (minimum 20 attempts per game): 51, Drew Brees, 2004–2020
- Most games with at least 75% pass completion rate and no interceptions, season (minimum 20 attempts per game): 6, Tom Brady, 2007; Dak Prescott, 2016
- Most games with at least 70% pass completion rate, career (minimum 20 attempts per game): 116, Drew Brees, 2004–2020
- Most games with at least 70% pass completion rate, season (minimum 20 attempts per game): 13, Drew Brees, 2017
- Most games with at least 70% pass completion rate and no interceptions, career (minimum 20 attempts per game): 75, Drew Brees, 2004–2020
- Most games with at least 70% pass completion rate and no interceptions, season (minimum 20 attempts per game): 9, Dak Prescott, 2016
- Most seasons with at least 70% pass completion rate (minimum 100 attempts per season): 5, Drew Brees; 2009, 2011, 2016–2018
- Most seasons with at least 60% pass completion rate (minimum 100 attempts per season): 21, Tom Brady; 2001–2007, 2009–2022

=== Passing yards ===
- Most seasons leading league: 7, Drew Brees, 2006, 2008, 2011–2012, 2014–2016
- Most consecutive seasons leading league: 4, Dan Fouts, 1979–1982
- Most passing yards, career: 89,214, Tom Brady, 2000–2022
- Highest yards per game, career: 285.2, Patrick Mahomes, (35,939 yards/126 games), 2017–2025
- Highest yards per game, season: 342.3, Peyton Manning, (5,477 yards/16 games), 2013, Drew Brees, (5,476 yards/16 games), 2011
- Most seasons 2,000+ yards: 21, Tom Brady, 2001–2007; 2009–2022
- Most seasons 2,500+ yards: 21, Tom Brady, 2001–2007, 2009–2022
- Most seasons 3,000+ yards: 20, Tom Brady, 2002–2007, 2009–2022
- Most seasons 3,500+ yards: 20, Tom Brady, 2002–2007, 2009–2022
- Most seasons 4,000+ yards: 14, Peyton Manning; 1999–2004, 2006–2010, 2012–2014; Tom Brady, 2005, 2007, 2009, 2011-2015, 2017-2022
- Most seasons 4,500+ yards: 8, Drew Brees, 2008, 2010–2016
- Most seasons 5,000+ yards: 5, Drew Brees; 2008, 2011–2013, 2016
- Most consecutive seasons 2,000+ yards: 19, Drew Brees, 2002–2020; Brett Favre, 1992–2010
- Most consecutive seasons 2,500+ yards: 19, Brett Favre, 1992–2010
- Most consecutive seasons 3,000+ yards: 18, Brett Favre, 1992–2009
- Most consecutive seasons 3,500+ yards: 14, Drew Brees, 2005–2018; Tom Brady, 2009–2022
- Most consecutive seasons 4,000+ yards: 12, Drew Brees, 2006–2017
- Most consecutive seasons 4,500+ yards: 7, Drew Brees, 2010–2016
- Most consecutive seasons 5,000+ yards: 3, Drew Brees, 2011–2013
- Most passing yards, season: 5,477, Peyton Manning, 2013
- Most passing yards, rookie, season: 4,374, Andrew Luck, 2012
- Most passing yards, season, home: 2,853, Drew Brees, 2015
- Most passing yards, season, away: 2,852, Drew Brees, 2011
- Most passing yards, game: 554, Norm Van Brocklin, September 28, 1951
- Most passing yards, combined, game: 1,000, Matthew Stafford, (520) and Matt Flynn, (480), January 1, 2012
- Most passing yards, 1st half: 361, Peyton Manning, January 9, 2005
- Most passing yards, 2nd half: 417, Kirk Cousins, December 17, 2022
- Most passing yards, overtime: 219, Derek Carr, October 30, 2016
- Most passing yards, game, perfect passer rating (158.3): 465, Jared Goff, Sep 27, 2018
- Most passing yards, game, rookie: 470, C. J. Stroud, November 5, 2023
- Most games, 200+ yards passing, career: 238, Tom Brady, 2000–2021
- Most games, 250+ yards passing, career: 189, Tom Brady, 2001–2022
- Most games, 300+ yards passing, career: 122, Drew Brees, 2002–2020
- Most games, 350+ yards passing, career: 63, Drew Brees, 2002–2019
- Most games, 400+ yards passing, career: 16, Drew Brees, 2001–2018
- Most games, 450+ yards passing, career: 6, Ben Roethlisberger, 2009–2018
- Most games, 500+ yards passing, career: 3, Ben Roethlisberger, 2009–2017
- Most games, 250+ yards passing, season: 16, Drew Brees, 2011
- Most games, 300+ yards passing, season: 13, Drew Brees, 2011
- Most games, 350+ yards passing, season: 8, Drew Brees, 2011; Peyton Manning, 2013
- Most games, 400+ yards passing, season: 4, Dan Marino, 1984; Peyton Manning, 2013; Ryan Fitzpatrick, 2018
- Most consecutive 200+ yards passing games: 64, Matt Ryan, 2013–2017
- Most consecutive 250+ yards passing games: 18, Drew Brees, 2010–2012
- Most consecutive 300+ yards passing games: 9, Drew Brees (twice) 2011–2012, 2012–2013
- Most consecutive 300+ yards passing games as rookie: 3, Joe Burrow, 2020
- Most consecutive 350+ yards passing games: 4, Drew Brees, 2011; Matthew Stafford, 2011–2012
- Most consecutive 400+ yards passing games: 3, Ryan Fitzpatrick, 2018; Dak Prescott, 2020
- Most consecutive 450+ yards passing games: 3, Dak Prescott, 2020
- Longest pass completion: 99 yards, by 13 players, most recently Eli Manning, December 24, 2011
- Youngest player, 3,000 yards passing: Jameis Winston (21 years, 342 days) December 13, 2015
- Youngest player, 4,000 yards passing: Jameis Winston (21 years, 363 days) January 3, 2016
- Fewest games to reach 10,000 career passing yards: 34, Patrick Mahomes, 2017–2020
- Fewest games to reach 15,000 career passing yards: 49, Patrick Mahomes, 2017–2021
- Fewest games to reach 20,000 career passing yards: 67, Patrick Mahomes, 2017–2022
- Fewest games to reach 25,000 career passing yards: 83, Patrick Mahomes, 2017–2023
- Fewest games to reach 30,000 career passing yards: 103, Patrick Mahomes, 2017-2024
- Fewest games to reach 35,000 career passing yards: 123, Patrick Mahomes, 2017-2025
- Fewest games to reach 40,000 career passing yards: 147, Matthew Stafford, 2009–2019
- Fewest games to reach 45,000 career passing yards: 165, Matthew Stafford, 2009–2020
- Fewest games to reach 50,000 career passing yards: 183, Drew Brees, 2001–2013, Matthew Stafford, 2009–2022
- Fewest games to reach 55,000 career passing yards: 199, Drew Brees, 2001–2014
- Fewest games to reach 60,000 career passing yards: 215, Drew Brees, 2001–2015
- Fewest games to reach 65,000 career passing yards: 230, Drew Brees, 2001–2016
- Fewest games to reach 70,000 career passing yards: 248, Drew Brees, 2001–2017
- Fewest games to reach 75,000 career passing yards: 267, Drew Brees, 2001–2019
- Fewest games to reach 80,000 career passing yards: 286, Drew Brees, 2001–2020
- Fewest games to reach 85,000 career passing yards: 321, Tom Brady, 2001–2022

=== Average passing yards ===
- Most seasons led league: 7, Sid Luckman, 1939–1943, 1946–47
- Most consecutive seasons led league: 5, Sid Luckman, 1939–1943
- Highest yards per attempt, career (minimum 1,500 attempts): 8.63 (13,499 yards on 1,565 attempts), Otto Graham, 1950–1955
- Highest yards per attempt, season (among qualified players): 11.17 (1,229 on 110 attempts), Tommy O'Connell, 1957
- Highest yards per attempt, rookie, season: 9.41 (1,854 yards on 197 attempts), Greg Cook, 1969
- Highest yards per attempt, game: 18.58 (446 yards on 24 attempts) Sammy Baugh, Oct 31, 1948

=== Passing touchdowns ===
Career

- Most passing touchdowns, career: 649, Tom Brady, 2000–2022
- Most games 1+ TD passes, career: 289, Tom Brady, 2000–2022
- Most red zone touchdown passes: 418, Tom Brady

Regular season

- Most seasons led league: 5, Tom Brady, 2002, 2007, 2010, 2015, 2021
- Most consecutive seasons led league: 4, Johnny Unitas, 1957–1960
- Most touchdown passes per game average, regular season: 2.12, Patrick Mahomes, (267 TD passes/126 games), 2017–2025.
- Most passing touchdowns, season: 55, Peyton Manning, 2013
- Most passing touchdowns, rookie, season: 31, Justin Herbert, 2020
- Most consecutive seasons, 1+ passing touchdowns: 21, Vinny Testaverde, 1987–2007
- Most consecutive seasons, 20+ passing touchdowns: 17, Drew Brees, 2004–2020
- Most consecutive seasons, 25+ passing touchdowns: 16, Peyton Manning, 1998–2014
- Most consecutive seasons, 30+ passing touchdowns: 9, Drew Brees, 2008–2016
- Most consecutive seasons, 35+ passing touchdowns: 3, Brett Favre, 1995–1997; Drew Brees, 2011–2013; Peyton Manning, 2012–2014 Patrick Mahomes, 2020–2022
- Most consecutive seasons, 40+ passing touchdowns: 2, Drew Brees, 2011–2012, Tom Brady, 2020–2021
- Most seasons, 20+ passing touchdowns: 20, Tom Brady, 2002–2007, 2009–2022
- Most seasons, 25+ passing touchdowns: 18, Tom Brady, 2002, 2004–2005, 2007, 2009–2022
- Most seasons, 30+ passing touchdowns: 10, Drew Brees, 2008–2016, 2018
- Most seasons, 35+ passing touchdowns: 6, Tom Brady, 2007, 2010–2011, 2015, 2020–2021; Aaron Rodgers, 2011–2012, 2014, 2016, 2020–2021
- Most seasons, 40+ passing touchdowns: 3, Tom Brady 2007, 2020, 2021; Aaron Rodgers, 2011, 2016, 2020
- Most consecutive games, 1+ passing touchdowns: 54, Drew Brees, 2009–2012
- Most consecutive uninterrupted games, 1+ passing touchdowns: 52, Tom Brady, 2010–2013
- Most consecutive passing touchdowns, no interceptions, home: 49, Aaron Rodgers

Game

- Most passing touchdowns, game: 7, Sid Luckman, November 14, 1943; Adrian Burk, October 17, 1954; George Blanda, November 19, 1961; Y. A. Tittle, October 28, 1962; Joe Kapp, September 28, 1969; Peyton Manning, September 5, 2013; Nick Foles, November 3, 2013; Drew Brees, November 1, 2015
- Most passing touchdowns, one half: 6, Daryle Lamonica, October 19, 1969; Aaron Rodgers, November 9, 2014
- Most passing touchdowns, rookie, one half: 4, Marcus Mariota, September 13, 2015; Jameis Winston, November 22, 2015
- Most passing touchdowns, one quarter: 5, Tom Brady, October 18, 2009
- Most passing touchdowns, no interceptions, game: 7, Y. A. Tittle, October 28, 1962; Peyton Manning, September 5, 2013; Nick Foles, November 3, 2013
- Most passing touchdowns, perfect passer rating (158.3), game: 7 Nick Foles, November 3, 2013
- Highest percentage of touchdown passes out of pass attempts, game: 35.29, Daryle Lamonica, (6 TD passes/17 attempts), December 21, 1969
- Most games, 1+ passing touchdowns: 291, Tom Brady, 2001–2022.
- Most games, 2+ passing touchdowns: 204, Tom Brady, 2001–2022.
- Most games, 3+ passing touchdowns: 104, Tom Brady, 2001–2022.
- Most games, 4+ passing touchdowns: 39, Tom Brady, 2001–2022.
- Most games, 5+ passing touchdowns: 11, Drew Brees, 2004–2019.
- Most games, 6+ passing touchdowns: 3, Peyton Manning, 2003–2013.
- Fewest games to reach 100 touchdown passes: 40, Patrick Mahomes, 2017–2020.
- Fewest games to reach 200 touchdown passes: 84, Patrick Mahomes, 2017–2023
- Fewest games to reach 300 touchdown passes: 144, Aaron Rodgers, 2005–2017
- Fewest games to reach 400 touchdown passes: 192, Aaron Rodgers, 2005–2020
- Fewest games to reach 500 touchdown passes: 244, Peyton Manning, 1998–2014
- Fewest games to reach 600 touchdown passes: 308, Tom Brady, 2001–2021.

=== Interceptions thrown ===
- Most seasons led league: 4, Vinny Testaverde, 1988–1989, 2000, 2004
- Most passes intercepted, career: 336, Brett Favre, 1991–2010
- Most passes intercepted, season: 42, George Blanda, 1962
- Most passes intercepted, rookie season: 28, Peyton Manning, 1998
- Most passes intercepted, game: 8, Jim Hardy, September 24, 1950
- Most passes intercepted, half: 5, Nathan Peterman, November 20, 2017
- Most consecutive passes attempted, none intercepted: 402, Aaron Rodgers, September 30, 2018 – December 16, 2018
- Most consecutive passes attempted, none intercepted to start a career: 191, C. J. Stroud, 2023
- Most consecutive passing attempts without an interception by a rookie: 354, Caleb Williams, 2024
- Most consecutive passes attempted, none intercepted to start a season: 287, Alex Smith, 2017
- Most attempts with no interceptions, game: 70 Drew Bledsoe, November 13, 1994
- Most completions with no interceptions, game: 45 Drew Bledsoe, November 13, 1994
- Most games with 200+ yards passing and no interceptions, career: 123, Tom Brady, 2001–2019
- Most games with 200+ yards passing and no interceptions, season: 11, Tom Brady, 2012; Aaron Rodgers, 2014 and 2020; Patrick Mahomes, 2020
- Most games with 1+ touchdown passes and no interceptions, career: 134, Tom Brady, 2001–2019
- Most games with 1+ touchdown passes and no interceptions, season: 14, Tom Brady 2010
- Most consecutive games with 1+ touchdown passes and no interceptions: 11, Tom Brady, 2010
- Fewest interceptions through 1,000 career passing attempts: 12, Caleb Williams

=== Pick Sixes ===
- Most pick sixes, career: 33, Matthew Stafford, 2009-2026
- Most pick sixes, season: 7, Jameis Winston, 2019
- Most pick sixes, game: 3, Eli Manning, November 25, 2007, Ed Baker (quarterback), December 17, 1972, John Hadl, December 19, 1971, Joe Namath, September 29, 1968

=== Lowest interception percentage ===
- Most seasons led league, interception percentage: 6, Aaron Rodgers, 2009, 2014, 2018-2021
- Lowest interception percentage, career (minimum 1,500 attempts): 1.4 (32 INTs, 2,246 attempts), Jacoby Brissett, 2016-2025, (123 INTs, 8,743 attempts), Aaron Rodgers, 2005-2025
- Lowest interception percentage, season (minimum 200 attempts): 0.0 (0 INTs, 200 attempts), Brian Hoyer, 2016
- Lowest interception percentage, season (minimum 16 starts): 0.335 (2 INTs, 597 attempts), Aaron Rodgers, 2018
- Lowest interception percentage, rookie season: 0.87 (4 INTs, 459 attempts), Dak Prescott, 2016

== Sacks, fumbles, and tackles ==
=== Sacked ===
- Most times sacked, career: 600, Aaron Rodgers, 2005–2025
- Most times sacked, season: 76, David Carr, 2002
- Most times sacked, game: 12, Bert Jones, October 26, 1980; Warren Moon, September 29, 1985; Donovan McNabb, September 30, 2007
- Most sack yards lost, career: 4,088, Aaron Rodgers, 2005-2025
- Lowest sacked percentage (times sacked per passing play attempted), season: 0.98%, Dan Marino, 1988
- Lowest sacked percentage (times sacked per passing play attempted), career: 2.83%, George Blanda

=== Fumbles ===
- Most fumbles, career: 166, Brett Favre, 1991–2010
- Most fumbles, season: 23; Kerry Collins, 2001; Daunte Culpepper, 2002
- Most fumbles, game: 7, Len Dawson, November 15, 1964

=== Fumbles recovered ===
While the NFL records recoveries for both own fumbles and opponents' fumbles, all quarterback records were set for recovering only their own fumbles.

- Most fumbles recovered, career: 56, Warren Moon, 1984–2000
- Most fumbles recovered, season: 12, David Carr, 2002
- Most fumbles recovered, game: 4,

Otto Graham on October 25, 1953
Sam Etcheverry on September 17, 1961
Roman Gabriel on October 12, 1969
Joe Ferguson on September 18, 1977
Randall Cunningham on November 30, 1986
Tony Romo on September 26, 2011
Matthew Stafford on 2013

=== Tackles ===
On rare occasions, a quarterback loses the ball due to either an interception or a fumble, and then tackles the opposing player in possession of the ball.

- Most tackles by a quarterback, career: 29, Joe Webb, 2010–2020

== Rushing ==
- Most rushing yards by a quarterback, career: 6,522, Lamar Jackson, 2018–2025
- Most rushing yards by a quarterback, season: 1,206, Lamar Jackson, 2019
- Most rushing yards by a quarterback, game: 181, Colin Kaepernick, January 12, 2013 (playoffs); 178, Justin Fields, November 6, 2022 (regular season)
- Most rushing attempts by a quarterback, career: 1,118, Cam Newton, 2011–2021
- Most rushing attempts by a quarterback, season: 176, Lamar Jackson, 2018–2025
- Most rushing touchdowns by a quarterback, career: 90, Josh Allen, 2018–2026
- Most rushing touchdowns by a quarterback, season: 15, Jalen Hurts, 2023; Josh Allen, 2023
- Most rushing touchdowns by a quarterback, game: 4, Bobby Douglass, Billy Kilmer
- Longest run by a quarterback: 93 yards, Terrelle Pryor, Oakland Raiders vs. Pittsburgh Steelers; October 27, 2013

== Wins/losses ==
=== Wins ===
Note: These records are not listed in NFL Record and Fact Book

- Most career wins, regular season, by a starting quarterback: 251, Tom Brady, 2001–2022.
- Most career wins, regular season, by a starting quarterback, single team: 219, Tom Brady, New England Patriots, 2000–2019.
- Most career wins, post-season, by a starting quarterback: 35, Tom Brady, 2001–2022.
- Most consecutive wins, regular season, by a starting quarterback: 23, Peyton Manning, Indianapolis Colts, 2008–2009
- Most consecutive wins, post-season, by a starting quarterback: 10, Tom Brady, New England Patriots, 2001, 2003–2005
- Most consecutive wins, regular season, to start a career for a starting quarterback: 15, Ben Roethlisberger, Pittsburgh Steelers, 2004–2005
- Most consecutive wins to start a career, post-season, by a starting quarterback: 10, Tom Brady, New England Patriots, 2001, 2003–2005
- Most consecutive home wins, regular season, by a starting quarterback: 31, Tom Brady, New England Patriots, 2006–2011
- Most consecutive home wins, regular season, to start a career for a quarterback: 15, Kurt Warner, St. Louis Rams, 1999–2001
- Most consecutive road wins, regular season, by a starting quarterback: 18, Joe Montana, San Francisco 49ers, 1988–1990, Kansas City Chiefs, 1993
- Most road wins in a season, regular season, by a starting quarterback: 8, Joe Montana, San Francisco 49ers, 1990; Kurt Warner, St. Louis Rams, 2001; Tom Brady, New England Patriots, 2007; Tony Romo, Dallas Cowboys, 2014
- Most road wins in a season, regular season, for a starting rookie quarterback: 6, Ben Roethlisberger, Pittsburgh Steelers, 2004; Dak Prescott, Dallas Cowboys, 2016; Mac Jones, New England Patriots, 2021
- Most home wins in a season, regular season, for a starting rookie quarterback: 8, Russell Wilson, Seattle Seahawks, 2012
- Most wins in a season, regular season, by a starting quarterback: 16, Tom Brady, New England Patriots, 2007
- Most wins, regular season, by a rookie starting quarterback: 13, Ben Roethlisberger, Pittsburgh Steelers, 2004; Dak Prescott, Dallas Cowboys, 2016
- Most wins in a season, post-season, by a rookie starting quarterback: 2, Joe Flacco, Baltimore Ravens, 2008; Mark Sanchez, New York Jets, 2009
- Most career home wins, post-season, by a starting quarterback: 22, Tom Brady, New England Patriots/Tampa Bay Buccaneers, 2002–2021.
- Most consecutive home wins, post-season, by a starting quarterback: 9, Tom Brady, New England Patriots, 2014–2019
- Most career road wins, post-season, by a starting quarterback: 7, Joe Flacco, Baltimore Ravens, 2008–2010, 2012, 2014, Tom Brady, New England Patriots, 2001–2019, Tampa Bay Buccaneers, 2020
- Most consecutive career road wins, post-season, by a starting quarterback: 5, Eli Manning, New York Giants 2007, 2011
- Most regular season home wins with one team by a starting quarterback: 121, Tom Brady, New England Patriots, 2001–2018
- Most road wins by a starting quarterback: 104, Tom Brady, 2001–2020.
- Most NFL teams defeated at least once, career: 32, Brett Favre, Peyton Manning, Drew Brees, and Tom Brady
- Most wins against a single opponent, regular season, by a starting quarterback: 33, Tom Brady, New England Patriots, 2001–2019, Tampa Bay Buccaneers, 2021 vs. Buffalo Bills.
- Fewest wins in a regular season by a starting quarterback who won the Super Bowl: 0, Doug Williams, Washington Redskins 1987
- Oldest starting quarterback to win a playoff game: Tom Brady (Philadelphia Eagles in Wild Card Round; 44 years 166 days)

=== Losses ===
Note: These records are not listed in NFL Record and Fact Book

- Most career losses, regular season, by a starting quarterback: 123, Vinny Testaverde, 1987–2007
- Most career home losses, regular season, by a starting quarterback: 56, Eli Manning, 2004–2019
- Most career home losses, regular season and post-season, by a starting quarterback: 58, Eli Manning, 2004–2019
- Most career road losses, regular season, by a starting quarterback: 76, Brett Favre, 1992–2010
- Most career road losses, regular season and post-season, by a starting quarterback: 83, Brett Favre, 1992–2010
- Most career losses, post-season, by a starting quarterback: 13, Tom Brady, 2000–2022; Peyton Manning, 2000–2015.
- Most career road losses, post-season, by a starting quarterback: 7, Brett Favre, 1993–2010
- Most career home losses, post-season, by a starting quarterback: 6, Peyton Manning, 2000–2015
- Most consecutive losses, post-season, by a starting quarterback: 4, Y. A. Tittle, 1957–1963; Warren Moon 1991–1994; Andy Dalton 2011–2014
- Most consecutive road losses, post-season, by a starting quarterback: 6, Dave Krieg, 1983–1994
- Most consecutive road losses by a starting quarterback: 14, Steve DeBerg, 1978–1979
- Most consecutive home losses by a starting quarterback: 10, Archie Manning, 1979–1980; Chris Weinke, 2001–2002, 2006
- Most road losses in a season, by a rookie starting quarterback: 8, Peyton Manning, Indianapolis Colts 1998; Derek Carr, Oakland Raiders, 2014
- Most losses in a season, by a starting quarterback: 15, Archie Manning, New Orleans Saints, 1980; Jeff George, Indianapolis Colts, 1991; DeShone Kizer, Cleveland Browns, 2017
- Most consecutive losses, by a rookie starting quarterback: 15, DeShone Kizer, Cleveland Browns, 2017
- Most losses in a season, by a rookie starting quarterback: 15, DeShone Kizer, Cleveland Browns, 2017
- Most consecutive losses in a season, by a starting quarterback: 15, DeShone Kizer, Cleveland Browns, 2017
- Most consecutive losses to start a season, by a starting quarterback: 15, DeShone Kizer, Cleveland Browns, 2017
- Most consecutive losses by a starting quarterback: 21, Dan Pastorini, Houston Oilers, 1972–1974
- Most consecutive losses by a starting quarterback, regular season, to start a career: 15, DeShone Kizer, Cleveland Browns, 2017
- Most consecutive road losses by a starting quarterback, regular season, to start a career: 13, Joey Harrington, Detroit Lions, 2002–2003; David Klingler, Cincinnati Bengals, 1992–1994
- Most losses during the regular season by a starting quarterback who won the Super Bowl: 7, Eli Manning, New York Giants, 2011

== Firsts ==
- First 1,000 yard passing season: Curly Lambeau, 1,094 passing yards, Green Bay Packers, 1924^{α}
- First 1,500 yard passing season: Cecil Isbell, 2,021 passing yards, Green Bay Packers, 1942
- First 2,000 yard passing season: Cecil Isbell, 2,021 passing yards, Green Bay Packers, 1942
- First 2,500 yard passing season: Sammy Baugh, 2,938 passing yards, Washington Redskins, 1947
- First 3,000 yard passing season: Johnny Unitas, 3,099 passing yards, Baltimore Colts, 1960
- First 3,500 yard passing season: Sonny Jurgensen, 3,723 passing yards, Washington Redskins, 1961
- First 4,000 yard passing season: Joe Namath, 4,007 passing yards, New York Jets, 1967
- First 4,500 yard passing season: Dan Fouts, 4,715 passing yards, San Diego Chargers, 1980
- First 5,000 yard passing season: Dan Marino, 5,084 passing yards, Miami Dolphins, 1984
- First 300 completion season: Fran Tarkenton, 345 completions, Minnesota Vikings, 1978
- First 350 completion season: Dan Fouts, 360 completions, San Diego Chargers, 1981
- First 400 completion season: Warren Moon, 404 completions, Houston Oilers, 1991
- First 450 completion season: Peyton Manning, 450 completions, Indianapolis Colts, 2010
- First 20 touchdown pass season: Benny Friedman, 20 touchdown passes, New York Giants, 1929^{α}
- First 30 touchdown pass season: Johnny Unitas, 32 touchdown passes, Baltimore Colts, 1959
- First 40 touchdown pass season: Dan Marino, 48 touchdown passes, Miami Dolphins, 1984
- First 50 touchdown pass season: Tom Brady, 50 touchdown passes, New England Patriots, 2007
- First 55 touchdown pass season: Peyton Manning, 55 touchdown passes, Denver Broncos, 2013
- First 400 yard passing game: Sid Luckman, 433 passing yards, Chicago Bears vs. New York Giants; November 14, 1943
- First 500 yard passing game: Norm Van Brocklin, 554 passing yards, Los Angeles Rams vs. New York Yanks; September 28, 1951
- First 40 completion game: Richard Todd, 42 completions, New York Jets vs. San Francisco 49ers; September 21, 1980
- First 4 touchdown pass game: Benny Friedman
- First 5 touchdown pass game: Ray Buivid, Chicago Bears vs. Chicago Cardinals; December 5, 1937
- First 6 touchdown pass game: Sammy Baugh, Washington Redskins vs. Brooklyn Dodgers; October 31, 1943
- First 7 touchdown pass game: Sid Luckman, Chicago Bears vs. New York Giants; November 14, 1943
- First player with 100 career touchdown passes: Sammy Baugh
- First player with 200 career touchdown passes: Y. A. Tittle
- First player with 300 career touchdown passes: Fran Tarkenton
- First player with 400 career touchdown passes: Dan Marino
- First player with 500 career touchdown passes: Brett Favre
- First player with 600 career touchdown passes: Tom Brady.
- First player with 10,000 career passing yards: Sammy Baugh
- First player with 20,000 career passing yards: Sammy Baugh
- First player with 30,000 career passing yards: Johnny Unitas
- First player with 40,000 career passing yards: Johnny Unitas
- First player with 50,000 career passing yards: Dan Marino
- First player with 60,000 career passing yards: Dan Marino
- First player with 70,000 career passing yards: Brett Favre
- First player with 80,000 career passing yards: Drew Brees
- First player with 85,000 career passing yards: Tom Brady
- First player with 1,000 career pass completions: Bobby Layne
- First player with 2,000 career pass completions: Y. A. Tittle
- First player with 3,000 career pass completions: Fran Tarkenton
- First player with 4,000 career pass completions: Dan Marino
- First player with 5,000 career pass completions: Brett Favre
- First player with 6,000 career pass completions: Brett Favre
- First player with 7,000 career pass completions: Drew Brees
- First player with 1,000 career pass attempts: Arnie Herber
- First player with 2,000 career pass attempts: Sammy Baugh
- First player with 3,000 career pass attempts: Bobby Layne
- First player with 4,000 career pass attempts: Johnny Unitas
- First player with 5,000 career pass attempts: Johnny Unitas
- First player with 6,000 career pass attempts: Fran Tarkenton
- First player with 7,000 career pass attempts: Dan Marino
- First player with 8,000 career pass attempts: Dan Marino
- First player with 9,000 career pass attempts: Brett Favre
- First player with 10,000 career pass attempts: Brett Favre
- First player with 11,000 career pass attempts: Tom Brady
- First player with 12,000 career pass attempts: Tom Brady
- First player with 100 career passing interceptions: Sammy Baugh
- First player with 200 career passing interceptions: Sammy Baugh
- First player with 300 career passing interceptions: Brett Favre

=== Starts ===
- First quarterback with 100 consecutive starts: Ron Jaworski November 27, 1983
- First quarterback with 200 consecutive starts: Brett Favre November 29, 2004

=== Wins ===
- First NFL quarterback to defeat 32 franchises: Brett Favre vs. Green Bay Packers; October 5, 2009
- First NFL quarterback to reach 100 career wins (regular season): Johnny Unitas vs. Green Bay Packers; November 9, 1969
- First NFL quarterback to reach 150 career wins (regular season): Brett Favre vs. San Diego Chargers; September 23, 2007
- First NFL quarterback to reach 200 career wins (regular season): Tom Brady vs. Kansas City Chiefs; October 14, 2018
- First NFL quarterback to reach 200 career wins (regular season and postseason combined): Peyton Manning vs. Carolina Panthers; February 7, 2016
- First NFL quarterback to reach 250 career wins (regular season and postseason combined): Tom Brady vs. Carolina Panthers; September 20, 2020
- First NFL quarterback to reach 250 career wins (regular season): Tom Brady vs. Arizona Cardinals; December 25, 2022

== See also ==
- List of NFL quarterback playoff records
- List of dual-threat quarterback records
