= List of NFL quarterback playoff records =

For playoff quarterback touchdown record see List of National Football League playoffs career passing touchdowns leaders.

The first official National Football League (NFL) playoff game was the 1933 NFL Championship Game between the Chicago Bears and New York Giants. A "playoff" game was played in 1932 between the Chicago Bears and Portsmouth Spartans to break a regular season tie, but is recorded in the team record books as a regular season game. Since then there have been a total over 525 NFL playoff games including games from the AFL, but not the AAFC. The following list shows career postseason records for each starting quarterback in the NFL playoffs.

Wins or losses are credited to the quarterback who started the game for each team, even if he was injured or failed to complete the game.

Note: from 1933 to 1949 some offenses did not employ a quarterback in the modern sense of the position. Listed below are the "primary passers" for those games, the players that passed the ball most in those games. They may not have actually started the game at quarterback. This format allows Hall of Fame quarterbacks like Sid Luckman and Sammy Baugh to maintain credit for their team's playoff records since they were obviously the top passer for their team. The players involved in such games are marked with an asterisk (*).

== Champion starters ==
The following 58 quarterbacks have led their team to an NFL, All-America Football Conference (AAFC) or American Football League (AFL) title. Super Bowls before the 1970 AFL–NFL merger are not included in total championship count. On April 1, 2025 the NFL announced AAFC records and statistics will be recognized in its official records. This adds four championships to Otto Graham's total which is now reflected in this list.

† is a member of the Pro Football Hall of Fame

| **Bold** denotes an active player | ^ Won with 2 teams |

| Rank | Quarterback | Team | NFL Championships | Super Bowls | Number of Super Bowls | Number of Total Championships |
|---|---|---|---|---|---|---|
| 1 | Otto Graham† | Browns | AAFC 1946, 1947, 1948, 1949; NFL 1950, 1954, 1955 | | | 7 |
| 1 | Tom Brady ^ | Patriots | | 2001, 2003, 2004, 2014, 2016, 2018 | 7 | 7 |
| 1 | Tom Brady ^ | Buccaneers | | 2020 | 7 | 7 |
| 3 | Bart Starr† | Packers | 1961, 1962, 1965, 1966, 1967 | 1966, 1967 | 2 | 5 |
| 4 | Sid Luckman*† | Bears | 1940, 1941, 1943, 1946 | | | 4 |
| 4 | Terry Bradshaw† | Steelers | | 1974, 1975, 1978, 1979 | 4 | 4 |
| 4 | Joe Montana† | 49ers | | 1981, 1984, 1988, 1989 | 4 | 4 |
| 7 | Johnny Unitas† | Colts | 1958, 1959 | 1970 | 1 | 3 |
| 7 | Len Dawson† | Dallas Texans; Chiefs | AFL 1962, 1966, 1969 | 1969 | 1 | 3 |
| 7 | Troy Aikman† | Cowboys | | 1992, 1993, 1995 | 3 | 3 |
| 7 | **Patrick Mahomes** | Chiefs | | 2019, 2022, 2023 | 3 | 3 |
| 11 | Ed Danowski* | Giants | 1934, 1938 | | | 2 |
| 11 | Arnie Herber *† | Packers | 1936, 1939 | | | 2 |
| 11 | Sammy Baugh *† | Redskins | 1937, 1942 | | | 2 |
| 11 | Bob Waterfield*† | Rams | 1945, 1951 | | | 2 |
| 11 | Tommy Thompson* | Eagles | 1948, 1949 | | | 2 |
| 11 | Bobby Layne† | Lions | 1952, 1953 | | | 2 |
| 11 | Tobin Rote ^ | Lions | 1957 | | | 2 |
| 11 | Tobin Rote ^ | Chargers | AFL 1963 | | | 2 |
| 11 | George Blanda† | Oilers | AFL 1960, 1961 | | | 2 |
| 11 | Jack Kemp | Bills | AFL 1964, 1965 | | | 2 |
| 11 | Roger Staubach† | Cowboys | | 1971, 1977 | 2 | 2 |
| 11 | Bob Griese† | Dolphins | | 1972, 1973 | 2 | 2 |
| 11 | Jim Plunkett | Raiders | | 1980, 1983 | 2 | 2 |
| 11 | John Elway† | Broncos | | 1997, 1998 | 2 | 2 |
| 11 | Ben Roethlisberger | Steelers | | 2005, 2008 | 2 | 2 |
| 11 | Peyton Manning ^† | Colts | | 2006 | 2 | 2 |
| 11 | Peyton Manning ^† | Broncos | | 2015 | 2 | 2 |
| 11 | Eli Manning | Giants | | 2007, 2011 | 2 | 2 |
| 27 | Carl Brumbaugh* | Bears | 1933 | | | 1 |
| 27 | Glenn Presnell* | Lions | 1935 | | | 1 |
| 27 | Irv Comp * | Packers | 1944 | | | 1 |
| 27 | Paul Christman * | Cardinals | 1947 | | | 1 |
| 27 | Don Heinrich | Giants | 1956 | | | 1 |
| 27 | Norm Van Brocklin† | Eagles | 1960 | | | 1 |
| 27 | Bill Wade | Bears | 1963 | | | 1 |
| 27 | Frank Ryan | Browns | 1964 | | | 1 |
| 27 | Daryle Lamonica | Raiders | AFL 1967 | | | 1 |
| 27 | Earl Morrall | Colts | 1968 | | | 1 |
| 27 | Joe Namath† | Jets | AFL 1968 | 1968 | 1 | 1 |
| 27 | Joe Kapp | Vikings | 1969 | | | 1 |
| 27 | Ken Stabler† | Raiders | | 1976 | 1 | 1 |
| 27 | Joe Theismann | Redskins | | 1982 | 1 | 1 |
| 27 | Jim McMahon | Bears | | 1985 | 1 | 1 |
| 27 | Phil Simms | Giants | | 1986 | 1 | 1 |
| 27 | Doug Williams | Redskins | | 1987 | 1 | 1 |
| 27 | Jeff Hostetler | Giants | | 1990 | 1 | 1 |
| 27 | Mark Rypien | Redskins | | 1991 | 1 | 1 |
| 27 | Steve Young† | 49ers | | 1994 | 1 | 1 |
| 27 | Brett Favre† | Packers | | 1996 | 1 | 1 |
| 27 | Kurt Warner† | Rams | | 1999 | 1 | 1 |
| 27 | Trent Dilfer | Ravens | | 2000 | 1 | 1 |
| 27 | Brad Johnson | Buccaneers | | 2002 | 1 | 1 |
| 27 | Drew Brees† | Saints | | 2009 | 1 | 1 |
| 27 | **Aaron Rodgers** | Packers | | 2010 | 1 | 1 |
| 27 | **Joe Flacco** | Ravens | | 2012 | 1 | 1 |
| 27 | Russell Wilson | Seahawks | | 2013 | 1 | 1 |
| 27 | Nick Foles | Eagles | | 2017 | 1 | 1 |
| 27 | **Matthew Stafford** | Rams | | 2021 | 1 | 1 |
| 27 | **Jalen Hurts** | Eagles | | 2024 | 1 | 1 |
| 27 | **Sam Darnold** | Seahawks | | 2025 | 1 | 1 |

== Winning starters ==
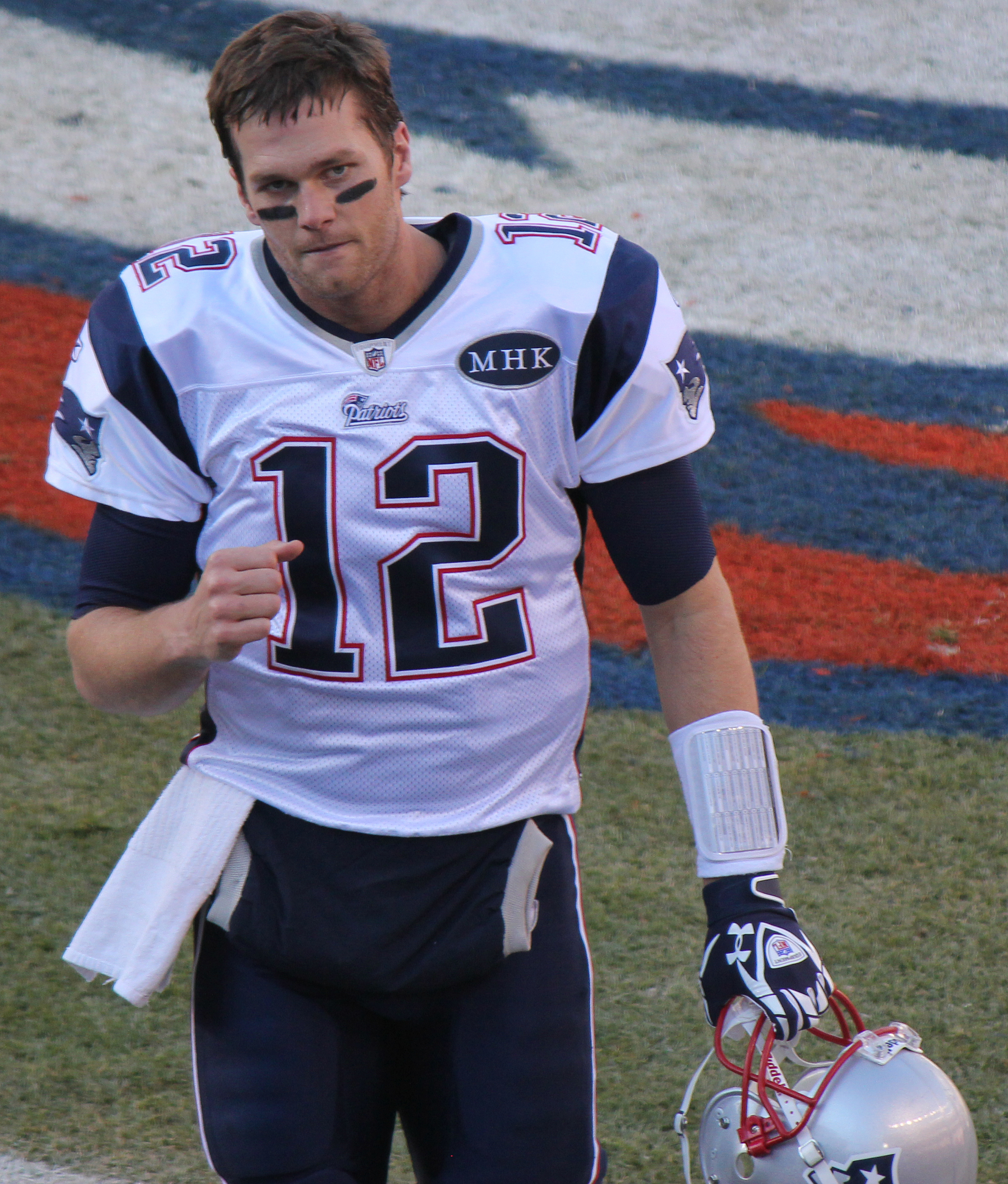
Tom Brady holds the NFL records for most playoff wins by a quarterback, 35, and for most playoff games started, 48.

Joe Flacco and Tom Brady are tied for the most road post-season wins (7), not including Super Bowls, which are played at a neutral site. For players with five or more playoff appearances, Bart Starr holds the record for the highest winning percentage, (.900) and is third for the record for most championships (five NFL titles plus two Super Bowl wins vs. AFL teams). As of April 2025, the All-America Football Conference records are recognized by the NFL. This makes Otto Graham and Tom Brady tied for first with seven championships each. Seven quarterbacks are undefeated in post-season play but all of them have just a single appearance as a starter except for Frank Reich who had two starts. Hall of Fame quarterback Y. A. Tittle shares the record with Andy Dalton for the highest number of playoff starts without ever winning a game (4). John Elway holds the record for the highest number of playoff wins before eventually winning his first Super Bowl (10). Donovan McNabb and Jim Kelly hold the record for the highest number of playoff wins (9) without winning the Super Bowl.

This table lists all quarterbacks who have won a playoff game in the NFL, AAFC, or the AFL.
Sort chart by clicking on heading. Reload page to return to original form.
Sorting 'Teams' in ascending order will list all champion quarterbacks for each team first and in the order they won the title game for their team.

**Bold** denotes an active player
**Won a Super Bowl^{^}** or Championship
**Won 2 or more Super Bowls** ** or Championships

From 1933 to 1969, NFL Champs are listed.
From 1946 to 1949, AAFC Champs are listed
From 1960 to 1969, AFL Champs are listed.
Super Bowls listed after 1970 NFL-AFL merger.

† is a member of the Pro Football Hall of Fame

Updated through the 2025-26 playoffs.

Quarterbacks Sorted by 1st – Most Wins 2nd – Fewest Losses
| Rank | Quarterback | Wins | Losses | Percent | Teams | Championship Season(s) | Ref |
|---|---|---|---|---|---|---|---|
| 1 | Tom Brady | 35 | 13 | .729 | Patriots** (30–11) | 2001, 2003, 2004, 2014, 2016, 2018 | |
| 1 | Tom Brady | 35 | 13 | .729 | Buccaneers^ (5–2) | 2020 | |
| 2 | **Patrick Mahomes** | 17 | 4 | .810 | Chiefs ** | 2019, 2022, 2023 | |
| 3 | Joe Montana† | 16 | 7 | .696 | 49ers** (14–5) Chiefs (2–2) | 1981, 1984, 1988, 1989 | |
| 4 | Terry Bradshaw† | 14 | 5 | .737 | Steelers** | 1974, 1975, 1978, 1979 | |
| 5 | John Elway† | 14 | 7 | .667 | Broncos** | 1997, 1998 | |
| 6 | Peyton Manning† | 14 | 13 | .519 | Colts^ (9–10) | 2006 | |
| 6 | Peyton Manning† | 14 | 13 | .519 | Broncos^ (5–3) | 2015 | |
| 7 | Ben Roethlisberger | 13 | 10 | .565 | Steelers** | 2005, 2008 | |
| 8 | Brett Favre† | 13 | 11 | .542 | Packers ^ (12–10) Vikings (1–1) | 1996 | |
| 9 | Troy Aikman† | 11 | 4 | .733 | Cowboys** | 1992, 1993, 1995 | |
| 10 | Roger Staubach† | 11 | 6 | .647 | Cowboys** | 1971, 1977 | |
| 11 | **Aaron Rodgers** | 11 | 11 | .500 | Packers ^ (11–10) Steelers (0–1) | 2010 | |
| 12 | **Joe Flacco** | 10 | 6 | .625 | Ravens ^ (10–5) Browns (0–1) | 2012 | |
| 13 | Bart Starr† | 9 | 1 | .900 | Packers** | 1961, 1962, 1965, 1966, 1967 | |
| 14 | Otto Graham† | 9 | 3 | .750 | Browns** | AAFC 1946, 1947, 1948, 1949; NFL 1950, 1954, 1955 | |
| 15 | Kurt Warner† | 9 | 4 | .692 | Rams ^ (5–2) Cardinals (4–2) | 1999 | |
| 16 | Donovan McNabb | 9 | 7 | .563 | Eagles | | |
| 17 | Russell Wilson | 9 | 8 | .529 | Seahawks ^ (9–7) Steelers (0–1) | 2013 | |
| 17 | Jim Kelly† | 9 | 8 | .529 | Bills | | |
| 19 | Drew Brees† | 9 | 9 | .500 | Chargers (0–1) Saints ^ (9–8) | 2009 | |
| 20 | Jim Plunkett | 8 | 2 | .800 | Raiders** | 1980, 1983 | |
| 21 | Eli Manning | 8 | 4 | .667 | Giants** | 2007, 2011 | |
| 22 | Steve Young† | 8 | 6 | .571 | 49ers ^ | 1994 | |
| 23 | **Josh Allen** | 8 | 7 | .533 | Bills | | |
| 24 | Dan Marino† | 8 | 10 | .444 | Dolphins | | |
| 25 | Ken Stabler† | 7 | 5 | .583 | Raiders ^ (7–4) Oilers (0–1) | 1976 | |
| 26 | **Matthew Stafford** | 7 | 6 | .538 | Lions (0–3) Rams ^ (7–3) | 2021 | |
| 27 | Johnny Unitas† | 6 | 2 | .750 | Colts** | 1958, 1959, 1970 | |
| 27 | Joe Theismann | 6 | 2 | .750 | Redskins ^ | 1982 | |
| 29 | **Jalen Hurts** | 6 | 4 | .600 | Eagles ^ | 2024 | |
| 29 | Phil Simms | 6 | 4 | .600 | Giants ^ | 1986 | |
| 31 | Bob Griese† | 6 | 5 | .545 | Dolphins** | 1972, 1973 | |
| 31 | Fran Tarkenton† | 6 | 5 | .545 | Vikings | | |
| 33 | Sid Luckman*† | 5 | 1 | .833 | Bears** | 1940, 1941, 1943, 1946 | |
| 33 | Trent Dilfer | 5 | 1 | .833 | Buccaneers (1–1) Ravens ^ (4–0) | 2000 | |
| 35 | Mark Rypien | 5 | 2 | .714 | Redskins ^ | 1991 | |
| 35 | **Joe Burrow** | 5 | 2 | .714 | Bengals | | |
| 37 | Len Dawson† | 5 | 3 | .625 | Dallas Texans / Chiefs** | AFL 1962, 1966, 1969 | |
| 37 | Jake Delhomme | 5 | 3 | .625 | Panthers | | |
| 37 | **Brock Purdy** | 5 | 3 | .625 | 49ers | | |
| 40 | Craig Morton | 5 | 5 | .500 | Cowboys (3–2); Broncos (2–3) | | |
| 40 | Danny White | 5 | 5 | .500 | Cowboys | | |
| 40 | Mark Brunell | 5 | 5 | .500 | Jaguars (4–4); Redskins (1–1) | | |
| 40 | Steve McNair | 5 | 5 | .500 | Titans (5–4); Ravens (0–1) | | |
| 44 | Matt Hasselbeck | 5 | 6 | .455 | Seahawks | | |
| 45 | Philip Rivers | 5 | 7 | .417 | Chargers (5–6); Colts (0–1) | | |
| 46 | Earl Morrall | 4 | 1 | .800 | Colts ^ (2–1) Dolphins (2–0) | 1968 | |
| 46 | Jeff Hostetler | 4 | 1 | .800 | Giants ^ (3–0) Raiders (1–1) | 1990 | |
| 48 | Mark Sanchez | 4 | 2 | .667 | Jets | | |
| 48 | Colin Kaepernick | 4 | 2 | .667 | 49ers | | |
| 48 | Nick Foles | 4 | 2 | .667 | Eagles ^ | 2017 | |
| 48 | **Jimmy Garoppolo** | 4 | 2 | .667 | 49ers | | |
| 52 | Doug Williams | 4 | 3 | .571 | Buccaneers (1–3) Redskins ^ (3–0) | 1987 | |
| 52 | Brad Johnson | 4 | 3 | .571 | Vikings (0–1); Redskins (1–1) Buccaneers ^ (3–1) | 2002 | |
| 52 | Rich Gannon | 4 | 3 | .571 | Raiders | | |
| 55 | Ron Jaworski | 4 | 4 | .500 | Rams (1–0); Eagles (3–4) | | |
| 55 | Andrew Luck | 4 | 4 | .500 | Colts | | |
| 57 | Daryle Lamonica | 4 | 5 | .444 | Raiders ^ | AFL 1967 | |
| 57 | **Jared Goff** | 4 | 5 | .444 | Rams (2–3); Lions (2–2) | | |
| 59 | Matt Ryan | 4 | 6 | .400 | Falcons | | |
| 60 | Tommy Thompson* | 3 | 1 | .750 | Eagles** | 1948, 1949 | |
| 60 | Bobby Layne† | 3 | 1 | .750 | Lions** | 1952, 1953 | |
| 60 | Tobin Rote | 3 | 1 | .750 | Lions** (2–0) | 1957 | |
| 60 | Tobin Rote | 3 | 1 | .750 | Chargers** (1–1) | AFL 1963 | |
| 60 | **Sam Darnold** | 3 | 1 | .750 | Vikings (0–1) Seahawks ^ (3–0) | 2025 | |
| 60 | **Drake Maye** | 3 | 1 | .750 | Patriots | | |
| 65 | Dan Pastorini | 3 | 2 | .600 | Oilers | | |
| 65 | David Woodley | 3 | 2 | .600 | Dolphins | | |
| 65 | Boomer Esiason | 3 | 2 | .600 | Bengals | | |
| 65 | Jay Schroeder | 3 | 2 | .600 | Redskins (2–1); Raiders (1–1) | | |
| 65 | Tony Eason | 3 | 2 | .600 | Patriots | | |
| 65 | Mike Tomczak | 3 | 2 | .600 | Bears (2–1); Steelers (1–1) | | |
| 71 | Sammy Baugh *† | 3 | 3 | .500 | Redskins** | 1937, 1942 | |
| 71 | Jim McMahon | 3 | 3 | .500 | Bears ^ (3–2) Vikings (0–1) | 1985 | |
| 71 | Vince Ferragamo | 3 | 3 | .500 | Rams | | |
| 71 | Stan Humphries | 3 | 3 | .500 | Chargers | | |
| 71 | Drew Bledsoe | 3 | 3 | .500 | Patriots | | |
| 71 | **C. J. Stroud** | 3 | 3 | .500 | Texans | | |
| 77 | Dan Fouts† | 3 | 4 | .429 | Chargers | | |
| 77 | Bernie Kosar | 3 | 4 | .429 | Browns | | |
| 77 | Neil O'Donnell | 3 | 4 | .429 | Steelers | | |
| 77 | Kerry Collins | 3 | 4 | .429 | Panthers (1–1); Giants (2–2); Titans (0–1) | | |
| 77 | Cam Newton | 3 | 4 | .429 | Panthers | | |
| 82 | **Lamar Jackson** | 3 | 5 | .375 | Ravens | | |
| 83 | Dave Krieg | 3 | 6 | .333 | Seahawks (3–4); Chiefs (0–1); Lions (0–1) | | |
| 83 | Randall Cunningham | 3 | 6 | .333 | Eagles (1–4); Vikings (2–2) | | |
| 85 | Warren Moon† | 3 | 7 | .300 | Oilers (3–6); Vikings (0–1) | | |
| 86 | Frank Reich | 2 | 0 | 1.000 | Bills | | |
| 87 | George Blanda† | 2 | 1 | .667 | Oilers** | AFL 1960, 1961 | |
| 87 | Don Heinrich | 2 | 1 | .667 | Giants ^ | 1956 | |
| 87 | Joe Namath† | 2 | 1 | .667 | Jets ^ | AFL 1968 | |
| 87 | Chris Chandler | 2 | 1 | .667 | Falcons | | |
| 87 | Blake Bortles | 2 | 1 | .667 | Jaguars | | |
| 87 | **Jayden Daniels** | 2 | 1 | .667 | Commanders | | |
| 93 | Ed Danowski* | 2 | 2 | .500 | Giants** | 1934, 1938 | |
| 93 | Arnie Herber *† | 2 | 2 | .500 | Packers** (2–1) Giants (0–1) | 1936, 1939 | |
| 93 | Bob Waterfield*† | 2 | 2 | .500 | Rams** | 1945, 1951 | |
| 93 | Norm Van Brocklin† | 2 | 2 | .500 | Rams (1–2) Eagles ^ (1–0) | 1960 | |
| 93 | Joe Kapp | 2 | 2 | .500 | Vikings ^ | 1969 | |
| 93 | Richard Todd | 2 | 2 | .500 | Jets | | |
| 93 | Tommy Kramer | 2 | 2 | .500 | Vikings | | |
| 93 | Kordell Stewart | 2 | 2 | .500 | Steelers | | |
| 93 | Daunte Culpepper | 2 | 2 | .500 | Vikings | | |
| 93 | Rex Grossman | 2 | 2 | .500 | Bears | | |
| 103 | John Brodie | 2 | 3 | .400 | 49ers | | |
| 103 | Bill Nelsen | 2 | 3 | .400 | Browns | | |
| 103 | Pat Haden | 2 | 3 | .400 | Rams | | |
| 103 | Wade Wilson | 2 | 3 | .400 | Vikings | | |
| 103 | Jim Everett | 2 | 3 | .400 | Rams | | |
| 103 | Jim Harbaugh | 2 | 3 | .400 | Bears (0–1); Colts (2–2) | | |
| 103 | Vinny Testaverde | 2 | 3 | .400 | Browns (1–1); Jets (1–2) | | |
| 103 | Michael Vick | 2 | 3 | .400 | Falcons (2–2); Eagles (0–1) | | |
| 103 | Ryan Tannehill | 2 | 3 | .400 | Titans | | |
| 103 | **Baker Mayfield** | 2 | 3 | .400 | Browns (1–1); Buccaneers (1–2) | | |
| 113 | Jack Kemp | 2 | 4 | .333 | Chargers (0–2) Bills** (2–2) | AFL 1964, 1965 | |
| 113 | Ken Anderson | 2 | 4 | .333 | Bengals | | |
| 113 | Jake Plummer | 2 | 4 | .333 | Cardinals (1–1); Broncos (1–3) | | |
| 113 | Jeff Garcia | 2 | 4 | .333 | 49ers (1–2); Eagles (1–1); Buccaneers (0–1) | | |
| 113 | Chad Pennington | 2 | 4 | .333 | Jets (2–3); Dolphins (0–1) | | |
| 113 | Tony Romo | 2 | 4 | .333 | Cowboys | | |
| 119 | Billy Kilmer | 2 | 5 | .286 | Redskins | | |
| 119 | Alex Smith | 2 | 5 | .286 | 49ers (1–1); Chiefs (1–4) | | |
| 119 | **Dak Prescott** | 2 | 5 | .286 | Cowboys | | |
| 122 | Glenn Presnell* | 1 | 0 | 1.000 | Lions ^ | 1935 | |
| 122 | Irv Comp * | 1 | 0 | 1.000 | Packers ^ | 1944 | |
| 122 | Paul Christman * | 1 | 0 | 1.000 | Cardinals ^ | 1947 | |
| 122 | Bill Wade | 1 | 0 | 1.000 | Bears ^ | 1963 | |
| 122 | Gifford Nielsen | 1 | 0 | 1.000 | Oilers | | |
| 122 | John Wolford | 1 | 0 | 1.000 | Rams | | |
| 128 | Carl Brumbaugh* | 1 | 1 | .500 | Bears ^ | 1933 | |
| 128 | Babe Parilli | 1 | 1 | .500 | Patriots | | |
| 128 | Lynn Dickey | 1 | 1 | .500 | Packers | | |
| 128 | Pat Ryan | 1 | 1 | .500 | Jets | | |
| 128 | Steve Fuller | 1 | 1 | .500 | Bears | | |
| 128 | Mark Malone | 1 | 1 | .500 | Steelers | | |
| 128 | Scott Brunner | 1 | 1 | .500 | Giants | | |
| 128 | Dieter Brock | 1 | 1 | .500 | Rams | | |
| 128 | Bubby Brister | 1 | 1 | .500 | Steelers | | |
| 128 | Chris Miller | 1 | 1 | .500 | Falcons | | |
| 128 | Steve Beuerlein | 1 | 1 | .500 | Cowboys | | |
| 128 | Rodney Peete | 1 | 1 | .500 | Eagles | | |
| 128 | Tommy Maddox | 1 | 1 | .500 | Steelers | | |
| 128 | Aaron Brooks | 1 | 1 | .500 | Saints | | |
| 128 | David Garrard | 1 | 1 | .500 | Jaguars | | |
| 128 | Tim Tebow | 1 | 1 | .500 | Broncos | | |
| 128 | Jay Cutler | 1 | 1 | .500 | Bears | | |
| 128 | T. J. Yates | 1 | 1 | .500 | Texans | | |
| 128 | Matt Schaub | 1 | 1 | .500 | Texans | | |
| 128 | Brock Osweiler | 1 | 1 | .500 | Texans | | |
| 128 | **Marcus Mariota** | 1 | 1 | .500 | Titans | | |
| 128 | **Case Keenum** | 1 | 1 | .500 | Vikings | | |
| 128 | **Daniel Jones** | 1 | 1 | .500 | Giants | | |
| 128 | **Bo Nix** | 1 | 1 | .500 | Broncos | | |
| 128 | **Caleb Williams** | 1 | 1 | .500 | Bears | | |
| 153 | Frank Ryan | 1 | 2 | .333 | Browns ^ | 1964 | |
| 153 | James Harris | 1 | 2 | .333 | Rams | | |
| 153 | Bob Lee | 1 | 2 | .333 | Vikings | | |
| 153 | Erik Kramer | 1 | 2 | .333 | Lions | | |
| 153 | Steve Walsh | 1 | 2 | .333 | Saints (0–1); Bears (1–1) | | |
| 153 | Jeff George | 1 | 2 | .333 | Falcons (0–1); Vikings (1–1) | | |
| 153 | Elvis Grbac | 1 | 2 | .333 | Chiefs (0–1); Ravens (1–1) | | |
| 153 | Jay Fiedler | 1 | 2 | .333 | Dolphins | | |
| 153 | Shaun King | 1 | 2 | .333 | Buccaneers | | |
| 153 | Marc Bulger | 1 | 2 | .333 | Rams | | |
| 153 | **Deshaun Watson** | 1 | 2 | .333 | Texans | | |
| 153 | **Trevor Lawrence** | 1 | 2 | .333 | Jaguars | | |
| 165 | Don Meredith | 1 | 3 | .250 | Cowboys | | |
| 165 | Joe Ferguson | 1 | 3 | .250 | Bills | | |
| 165 | Steve Bartkowski | 1 | 3 | .250 | Falcons | | |
| 165 | Steve DeBerg | 1 | 3 | .250 | Broncos (0–1); Chiefs (1–2) | | |
| 165 | Carson Palmer | 1 | 3 | .250 | Bengals (0–2); Cardinals (1–1) | | |
| 165 | **Kirk Cousins** | 1 | 3 | .250 | Redskins (0–1); Vikings (1–2) | | |
| 165 | **Jordan Love** | 1 | 3 | .250 | Packers | | |
| Rank | Quarterback | Wins | Losses | Percent | Teams | Championship Season(s) | Ref |

== Remaining starters ==
The following quarterbacks have started in at least one playoff game, but have not earned a win.

Updated through the 2025-26 playoffs.

| | **Bold** denotes an active quarterback |
| † | Member of the Pro Football Hall of Fame |

1 Playoff Loss
| Team | Quarterback |
|---|---|
| Bears | Bob Avellini |
| Bears | Ed Brown |
| Bears | Johnny Lujack |
| Bears | Bernie Masterson |
| Bears | Jim Miller |
| Bengals | Virgil Carter |
| Bengals | A. J. McCarron |
| Bills | Rob Johnson |
| Bills | **Tyrod Taylor** |
| Broncos | **Jarrett Stidham** |
| Browns | Kelly Holcomb |
| Browns | Paul McDonald |
| Browns | Tommy O'Connell |
| Browns | Milt Plum |
| Browns | Brian Sipe |
| Browns | Don Strock |
| Buccaneers | Chris Simms |
| Cardinals | Ryan Lindley |
| Cardinals | Neil Lomax |
| Cardinals | Ray Mallouf |
| Cardinals | **Kyler Murray** |
| Chiefs | Todd Blackledge |
| Chiefs | Steve Bono |
| Chiefs | Matt Cassel |
| Colts | Tom Matte |
| Colts | Jack Trudeau |
| Commanders/ Redskins | Todd Collins |
| Commanders/ Redskins | Riley Smith* |
| Commanders/ Redskins | Robert Griffin III |
| Commanders/ Redskins | Taylor Heinicke |
| Cowboys | Quincy Carter |
| Dolphins | Matt Moore |
| Dolphins | **Tua Tagovailoa** |
| Dolphins | **Skylar Thompson** |

1 Playoff Loss
| Team | Quarterback |
|---|---|
| Eagles | Ty Detmer |
| Eagles | **Carson Wentz** |
| Giants | Frank Filchock* |
| Giants | Danny Kanell |
| Giants | Harry Newman* |
| Jaguars | Byron Leftwich |
| Lions | Gary Danielson |
| Lions | Eric Hipple |
| Lions | Greg Landry |
| Packers | Scott Hunter |
| Packers | Cecil Isbell* |
| Panthers | **Bryce Young** |
| Patriots | Scott Zolak |
| Patriots | **Mac Jones** |
| Raiders | Connor Cook |
| Raiders | Todd Marinovich |
| Raiders | Marc Wilson |
| Raiders | Derek Carr |
| Rams | Jeff Kemp |
| Ravens | Anthony Wright |
| Ravens | Tyler Huntley |
| Seahawks | Jon Kitna |
| Seahawks | **Geno Smith** |
| Steelers | Johnny Clement* |
| Steelers | Cliff Stoudt |
| Steelers | **Mason Rudolph** |
| Texans | Brian Hoyer |
| Oilers; Titans | Cody Carlson |
| Oilers; Titans | Vince Young |
| Vikings | Teddy Bridgewater |
| Vikings | Gary Cuozzo |
| Vikings | Tarvaris Jackson |
| Vikings | Sean Salisbury |
| Vikings | Joe Webb |

2 Playoff Losses
v
| Quarterback | Team |
| Doug Flutie | Bears; Bills |
| Mike Phipps | Browns; Bears |
| **Mitchell Trubisky** | Bears |
| Jim Hart | Cardinals |
| John Hadl | Chargers; Rams |
| Trent Green | Chiefs |
| Charlie Conerly | Giants |
| Tuffy Leemans* | Giants |
| Ken O'Brien | Jets |
| Gus Frerotte | Lions; Broncos |
| Scott Mitchell | Lions |
| Pete Beathard | Oilers |
| Roman Gabriel | Rams |
v
**3 Playoff Losses**
| Quarterback | Team |
| **Justin Herbert** | Chargers |
| Bert Jones | Colts |
| Steve Grogan | Patriots |
| Bobby Hebert | Saints |
v
**4 Playoff Losses**
| Quarterback | Team |
| Y. A. Tittle† | 49ers (0–1); Giants (0–3) |
| **Andy Dalton** | Bengals |

== See also ==
- List of NFL quarterback records
- List of National Football League playoffs career passing touchdowns leaders
- List of NFL franchise post-season streaks
- List of NFL franchise post-season droughts
- Most wins by a starting quarterback (NFL)
- List of NFL head coaches by playoff record
