= List of NFL individual records =

This is a list of the records in the National Football League (NFL) set by individual players. For records specific to quarterbacks, see List of NFL quarterback records.

== Service ==
- Most seasons: 26, George Blanda, 1949–1958, 1960–1975
- Most seasons, one team: 21, Jason Hanson (Detroit Lions), 1992–2012
- Most games played, career: 382, Morten Andersen, 1982–2007
- Most games played, one team: 327, Jason Hanson (Detroit Lions), 1992–2012
- Most consecutive games played, career: 352, Jeff Feagles, 1988–2009
- Most consecutive games played, one team: 270, Jim Marshall (Minnesota Vikings), 1961–1979
- Most consecutive snaps: 10,363, Joe Thomas (Cleveland Browns), 2007–2017

=== Starts ===
Note: These records are not listed in the NFL Record and Fact Book.

- Most starts, career:
  - Regular season: 333, Tom Brady, 2001–2022
  - Playoffs: 48, Tom Brady, 2001–2022
- Most starts, career, one team: 293, Bruce Matthews (Houston / Tennessee Oilers / Titans), 1983–2001
- Most consecutive starts: 297 (321 including playoffs), Brett Favre, 1992–2010
- Most consecutive starts to begin a career: 208 (227 including playoffs) Peyton Manning, 1998–2011
- Most consecutive starts to begin a career, including playoffs: 231 (207 regular season; 24 playoffs) Gene Upshaw, 1967–1981
- Most consecutive starts by a quarterback: 297 (321 including playoffs), Brett Favre, 1992–2010
- Most consecutive starts by a receiver: 176 (185 including playoffs), Tim Brown, 1992–2003
- Most consecutive starts by a running back: 170 (178 including playoffs), Walter Payton, 1975–1987
- Most consecutive starts by an offensive lineman: 240 (259 including playoffs), Mick Tingelhoff, 1962–1979
- Most consecutive starts by a defensive lineman: 270 (289 including playoffs), Jim Marshall, 1961–1978
- Most consecutive starts by a linebacker: 215 (221 including playoffs), London Fletcher, 2000–2013
- Most consecutive starts by a defensive back: 215 (224 including playoffs), Ronde Barber, 1999–2012
- Most consecutive starts by a punter: 352 (363 including playoffs), Jeff Feagles 1988–2009
- Most consecutive starts by a kicker: 258 (281 including playoffs), Mason Crosby 2007–2023
- Most consecutive starts by a long snapper: 253 (262 including playoffs), L. P. Ladouceur 2005–2021
- Most consecutive starts by a kick/punt returner: 73 (74 including playoffs), Carl Roaches 1980–1984

== Scoring ==
- Most points scored, career: 2,673, Adam Vinatieri, 1996–2020
- Most points scored, season: 186, LaDainian Tomlinson, 2006
- Most points scored, season, no touchdowns: 171, Jason Myers, 2025
- Most points scored, season, rookie: 150, Cody Parkey, 2014
- Most seasons leading league: 5, Don Hutson, 1940–1944; Gino Cappelletti, 1961, 1963–1966; Stephen Gostkowski, 2008, 2012–2015
- Most consecutive seasons leading league: 5, Don Hutson, 1940–1944
- Most seasons, 100+ points: 21, Adam Vinatieri, 1996–2008, 2010, 2012–2018
- Most points scored, game: 40, Ernie Nevers, Nov 28, 1929
- Most points scored, game, no touchdowns: 26, Rob Bironas, Oct 21, 2007
- Most consecutive games scoring: 360, Morten Andersen, 1983–2004, 2006–2007

=== Touchdowns ===
Note: this section applies to touchdowns scored by running, receiving, or returning. Passing touchdowns are listed separately.

- Most touchdowns, career: 208, Jerry Rice, 1985–2004
- Most touchdowns, season: 31, LaDainian Tomlinson, 2006
- Most touchdowns, rookie season: 22, Gale Sayers, 1965
- Most seasons leading league touchdowns: 8, Don Hutson, 1935–1938, 1941–1944
- Most consecutive seasons leading league touchdowns: 4, Don Hutson, 1935–1938, 1941–1944
- Most touchdowns, game: 6, Ernie Nevers, November 28, 1929; Dub Jones, November 25, 1951; Gale Sayers, December 12, 1965; Alvin Kamara, December 25, 2020
- Most consecutive games touchdown: 18, LaDainian Tomlinson, 2004–2005; Lenny Moore, 1963–1965

=== Points after touchdown ===
- Most seasons leading league: 8, George Blanda, 1956, 1961–62, 1967–1969, 1972, 1974
- Most kicking attempts, career: 959, George Blanda, 1949–1976
- Most kicks made, career: 943, George Blanda, 1949–1976
- Most kicking attempts, season: 75, Matt Prater, 2013
- Most kicks made, season: 75, Matt Prater, 2013
- Most kicks made, rookie season: 60, Doug Brien, 1994
- Most kicks attempted, game: 10, Charlie Gogolak, November 27, 1966, Jason Sanders, September 24, 2023
- Most kicks made, game: 10, Jason Sanders, September 24, 2023
- Most kicks made no misses, season: 75, Matt Prater, 2013
- Most kicks made no misses, rookie season: 54, Cody Parkey, 2014
- Most kicks made no misses, game: 10, Jason Sanders, September 24, 2023
- Most consecutive kicks made: 478, Stephen Gostkowski, 2006–2016
- Most consecutive kicks made (including playoffs): 523, Stephen Gostkowski, December 31, 2006 – January 16, 2016
- Highest percentage kicks made career (minimum 200 attempts): 99.8%, Rian Lindell, (432/433) 2000–2013
- Most two point conversions, career: 7, Alvin Kamara, 2017–present, Marshall Faulk, 1994–2005, Zach Ertz, 2013-present
- Most two point conversions, season: 4, Todd Heap, 2003
- Most two point conversions, game: 2, by 13 players, most recently Duke Johnson, Sep 30, 2018

=== Field goals ===
- Most seasons leading league: 5, Lou Groza, 1950, 1952–1954, 1957
- Most consecutive seasons leading league: 3, Lou Groza, 1952–1954
- Most field goals attempted, career: 709, Morten Andersen, 1982–2004, 2006–2007
- Most field goals made, career: 599, Adam Vinatieri, 1996–2019
- Most overtime field goals made, career: 11, Adam Vinatieri, 1996–2019
- Most field goals attempted, season: 52, David Akers, 2011
- Most field goals made, season: 44, David Akers, 2011, Kaʻimi Fairbairn, 2025
- Most field goals attempted, game: 9, Jim Bakken, Sep 24, 1967
- Most field goals made, game: 8, Rob Bironas, Oct 21, 2007
- Most field goals made, game, no misses: 8, Rob Bironas, Oct 21, 2007
- Most field goals made, one half: 5; Chris Boniol, Nov 18, 1996, Morten Andersen, Sep 3, 2000, Rob Bironas, Oct 21, 2007, and Mike Nugent, Sep 7, 2014
- Most field goals made, one quarter: 4, by 11 players, most recently Austin Seibert, Nov 3, 2019
- Most games, 1+ field goals made, career: 300, Adam Vinatieri, 1996–2019
- Most consecutive games with field goal made: 38, Matt Stover, 1999–2001
- Most consecutive field goals made: 44, Adam Vinatieri, October 4, 2015 – October 20, 2016
- Most consecutive field goals made (postseason): 23, Mason Crosby, January 15, 2011 – January 22, 2017
- Most consecutive field goals made (regular season and postseason combined): 46, Gary Anderson, December 15, 1997 – January 17, 1999
- Longest field goal: 68 yards, Cam Little (vs. Raiders), November 2, 2025
- Highest field goal percentage, career (minimum 100 FG made): 93.5% (129/138), Cameron Dicker, 2022–present
- Highest field goal percentage, season (minimum 20 attempts): 100.0%, Gary Anderson, 1998 (35/35); Mike Vanderjagt, 2003 (37/37); Jason Myers, 2020 (24/24)
- Lowest field goal percentage, season (most attempts, none made): 0.0, Boris Shlapak (0/8), 1972
- Lowest field goal percentage, season (minimum 10 attempts): 6.67, Bob Timberlake (1/15), 1965
- Most field goals made, 50+ yards, career: 82, Matt Prater, 2007–present
- Most field goals made, 60+ yards, career: 6, Brandon Aubrey, 2023–present
- Most field goals made, 50+ yards, season: 14, Brandon Aubrey, 2024
- Most field goals made, 50+ yards, game: 4, Matt Gay, September 24, 2023
- Most field goals made, 50+ yards, half: 3, Phil Dawson, September 27, 2012; Justin Tucker, November 27, 2016; Tyler Bass, November 15, 2020

=== Safeties ===
- Most safeties, career: 4, Ted Hendricks, 1969–1983; Doug English, 1975–1985; Jared Allen, 2004–2015; Justin Houston, 2011–2022
- Most safeties, season: 2, by 19 players, most recently Justin Houston, 2020
- Most safeties, rookie season: 2, Jameel McClain, 2008; Jim Young, 1977
- Most safeties, game: 2, Fred Dryer, Oct 21, 1973
- Most safeties, one quarter: 2, Fred Dryer, October 21, 1973
- Most consecutive games, safety: 2, Doug English, September 4, 1983 – September 11, 1983
- Most consecutive seasons, safety: 3, Charlie Krueger, 1959–1961; Ted Hendricks, 1974–1976; Eric Swann, 1992–1994

== Rushing ==
=== Rushing attempts ===
- Most seasons leading league, rushing attempts: 6, Jim Brown; 1958–1959, 1961, 1963–1965
- Most consecutive seasons leading league, rushing attempts: 4; Steve Van Buren, 1947–1950 and Walter Payton, 1976–1979
- Most rushing attempts per game average, career: 21.2, Terrell Davis, 1995–2001
- Most rushing attempts, career: 4,409, Emmitt Smith, 1990–2004
- Most rushing attempts, season: 416, Larry Johnson, 2006
- Most rushing attempts, rookie, season: 390, Eric Dickerson, 1983
- Most rushing attempts, game: 45, Jamie Morris, December 17, 1988 (OT)
- Most rushing attempts, game, rookie: 45, Jamie Morris, December 17, 1988 (OT)
- Most rushing attempts, first game: 36, LaDainian Tomlinson, September 9, 2001
- Most rushing attempts, no fumbles, season: 397, Gerald Riggs, 1985
- Most consecutive rushing attempts, no fumbles, to start a career: 637, Phillip Lindsay, 2018–2022
- Most consecutive rushing attempts, no fumbles: 1,001, LaDainian Tomlinson, October 22, 2006 – November 29, 2009
- Most seasons, 200 rushing attempts: 14, Emmitt Smith, 1990–2004
- Most seasons, 250 rushing attempts: 13, Emmitt Smith, 1991–2004
- Most seasons, 300 rushing attempts: 10, Walter Payton, 1976–1986
- Most consecutive seasons, 200 rushing attempts: 13, Emmitt Smith, 1990–2002
- Most consecutive seasons, 250 rushing attempts: 12, Emmitt Smith, 1991–2002
- Most consecutive seasons, 300 rushing attempts: 8, Eddie George, 1996–2003
- Most games, 20 rushing attempts, career: 121, Emmitt Smith, 1990–2004
- Most games, 25 rushing attempts, career: 56, Emmitt Smith, 1991–2004
- Most games, 30 rushing attempts, career: 21, Eric Dickerson, 1983–1991
- Most games, 35 rushing attempts, career: 7, Walter Payton, 1976–1984
- Most games, 40 rushing attempts, career: 2; James Wilder Sr., 1983–1984; Ricky Williams, 1999–2003
- Most games, 20 rushing attempts, season: 14, by 8 players, most recently Shaun Alexander, 2005
- Most games, 25 rushing attempts, season: 10; Larry Johnson, 2006; Jamal Anderson, 1998; Emmitt Smith, 1994
- Most games, 30 rushing attempts, season: 7, Earl Campbell, 1979
- Most games, 35 rushing attempts, season: 3; Earl Campbell, 1980; Eddie George, 2000

=== Rushing yards ===
- Most seasons leading league: 8, Jim Brown; 1957–1961, 1963–1965
- Most consecutive seasons leading league: 5, Jim Brown, 1957–1961
- Most rushing yards per game average, career: 104.3, Jim Brown, 1957–1965
- Most rushing yards per game average, season: 143.1, O. J. Simpson, 1973
- Most yards gained, career: 18,355, Emmitt Smith, 1990–2004
- Most seasons, 500+ yards rushing: 16, Frank Gore, 2005–2020
- Most seasons, 1,000+ yards rushing: 11, Emmitt Smith, 1991–2001
- Most seasons, 1,500+ yards rushing: 5, Barry Sanders, 1991–1997
- Most consecutive seasons, 500+ yards rushing: 16, Frank Gore, 2005–2020
- Most consecutive seasons, 1,000+ yards rushing: 11, Emmitt Smith, 1991–2001
- Most consecutive seasons, 1,500+ yards rushing: 4, Barry Sanders, 1994–1997
- Most yards gained, season: 2,105, Eric Dickerson, 1984
- Most yards gained, no fumbles, season: 1,883, Barry Sanders, 1994
- Most yards gained, rookie, season: 1,808 Eric Dickerson, 1983
- Most yards gained, no fumbles, rookie, season: 1,307 Saquon Barkley, 2018
- Most yards gained, season, home: 1,125, Walter Payton, 1977
- Most yards gained, season, away: 1,087, Eric Dickerson, 1984
- Most yards gained, back-to-back games: 476, O. J. Simpson, November 25, 1976 – December 5, 1976
- Most yards gained, game: 296, Adrian Peterson, November 4, 2007
- Most yards gained, one half: 253, Adrian Peterson, November 4, 2007
- Most yards gained, first game: 194, Alan Ameche, September 25, 1955
- Most yards gained, game, rookie: 296, Adrian Peterson, November 4, 2007
- Most yards gained, one quarter: 165, Jamaal Charles, December 23, 2012
- Most games, 50+ yards rushing, career: 173, Emmitt Smith, 1990–2004
- Most games, 100+ yards rushing, career: 78, Emmitt Smith, 1990–2004
- Most games, 150+ yards rushing, career: 25, Barry Sanders, 1989–1998
- Most games, 200+ yards rushing, career: 7, Derrick Henry, 2018–2025
- Most games, 250+ yards rushing, career: 2, O. J. Simpson, 1973–1976
- Most games, 100+ yards rushing, season: 14, Barry Sanders, 1997
- Most games, 150+ yards rushing, season: 7, Earl Campbell, 1980; Adrian Peterson, 2012
- Most games, 200+ yards rushing, season: 4, Earl Campbell, 1980
- Most consecutive games, 50+ yards rushing: 38, Priest Holmes, 2001–2003
- Most consecutive games, 100+ yards rushing: 14, Barry Sanders, 1997
- Most consecutive games, 150+ yards rushing: 4, Earl Campbell, 1980
- Most consecutive games, 200+ yards rushing: 2, O. J. Simpson, 1973, 1976; Earl Campbell 1980; Ricky Williams 2002; Jay Ajayi, 2016
- Most consecutive games to start a season, 100+ yards rushing: 8, DeMarco Murray, 2014
- Most rushing yards by a quarterback, career: 6,522, Lamar Jackson, 2019–present
- Most rushing yards by a quarterback, season: 1,206, Lamar Jackson, 2019
- Most rushing yards by a quarterback, game: 181, Colin Kaepernick, January 12, 2013 (playoffs); 178, Justin Fields, November 6, 2022 (regular season)
- Most rushing yards per attempt, career (minimum 750 attempts): 7.0 yards (6,109 yards/873 attempts), Michael Vick, 2001–2015
- Most rushing yards per attempt, career (minimum 1,000 attempts): 5.7 yards (4,720 yards/828 attempts), Marion Motley, 1946–1955
- Most rushing yards per attempt, season (qualifiers): 8.45 yards (1,039 yards/123 attempts), Michael Vick, 2006
- Highest average gain per attempt, rookie season (qualifiers): 8.44 yards (1,004 yards/119 attempts), Beattie Feathers, 1934
- Highest average gain per attempt, game (minimum 10 attempts): 17.3 yards, Michael Vick December 1, 2002, vs. Minnesota Vikings
- Fewest games to reach 1,000 career rushing yards: 8, Adrian Peterson, 2007
- Fewest games to reach 2,000 career rushing yards: 18, Eric Dickerson, 1983–1984
- Fewest games to reach 3,000 career rushing yards: 27, Eric Dickerson, 1983–1984
- Fewest games to reach 4,000 career rushing yards: 33, Eric Dickerson, 1983–1985
- Fewest games to reach 5,000 career rushing yards: 45, Eric Dickerson, 1983–1985
- Fewest games to reach 6,000 career rushing yards: 53, Eric Dickerson, 1983–1986
- Fewest games to reach 7,000 career rushing yards: 63, Eric Dickerson, 1983–1986
- Fewest games to reach 8,000 career rushing yards: 73, Eric Dickerson, 1983–1987
- Fewest games to reach 9,000 career rushing yards: 82, Eric Dickerson, 1983–1988
- Fewest games to reach 10,000 career rushing yards: 91, Eric Dickerson, 1983–1989
- Fewest games to reach 11,000 career rushing yards: 103, Eric Dickerson, 1983–1989
- Fewest games to reach 12,000 career rushing yards: 115, Jim Brown, 1957–1965
- Fewest games to reach 13,000 career rushing yards: 133, Barry Sanders, 1989–1997

=== Rushing touchdowns ===
- Most seasons leading league, touchdowns: 5, Jim Brown; 1957–1959, 1963, 1965
- Most consecutive seasons leading league, touchdowns: 4, Cookie Gilchrist (American Football League), 1962–1965
- Most touchdowns, career: 164, Emmitt Smith, 1990–2004
- Most rushing touchdowns, season: 28, LaDainian Tomlinson, 2006
- Most rushing touchdowns, rookie, season: 18, Eric Dickerson, 1983
- Most rushing touchdowns, season, home: 16, Terry Allen, 1996; Priest Holmes, 2003; Shaun Alexander, 2005
- Most rushing touchdowns, season, away: 16, John Riggins, 1983
- Most rushing touchdowns in a single postseason: 8, Terrell Davis, 1997
- Most rushing touchdowns, game: 6, Ernie Nevers, Nov 28, 1929; Alvin Kamara, Dec 25, 2020
- Most rushing touchdowns, one half: 4, Jim Brown, November 18, 1962; Roland Hooks, September 9, 1979; Chuck Muncie, November 29, 1981; Eric Dickerson, October 31, 1988; Shaun Alexander, September 29, 2002; Priest Holmes, October 24, 2004; Doug Martin, November 4, 2012
- Most seasons, 1+ rushing touchdowns: 16, Marcus Allen, 1982–1997
- Most consecutive seasons, 1+ rushing touchdowns: 16, Marcus Allen, 1982–1997
- Most games, 1+ rushing touchdowns, career: 117, Emmitt Smith, 1990–2004
- Most games, 1+ rushing touchdowns, season: 15, Emmitt Smith, 1995
- Most consecutive games, 1+ rushing touchdown: 14, LaDainian Tomlinson, 2004–2005
- Most rushing touchdowns by a quarterback, career: 79, Josh Allen, 2018–present
- Most rushing touchdowns by a quarterback, season: 15, Jalen Hurts, 2023; Josh Allen, 2023
- Most rushing touchdowns by a quarterback, game: 4, many players

== Receiving ==
=== Receptions ===
- Most seasons leading league: 8, Don Hutson, 1936–37, 1939, 1941–1945
- Most consecutive seasons leading league: 5, Don Hutson, 1941–1945
- Most pass receptions, career: 1,549, Jerry Rice, 1985–2004
- Most pass receptions, season: 149, Michael Thomas, 2019
- Most pass receptions, postseason, career: 178, Travis Kelce, 2013-2024
- Most pass receptions, postseason, single season: 33, Cooper Kupp, 2021
- Most pass receptions, rookie, season: 112, Brock Bowers, 2024
- Most pass receptions, career, tight end: 1,325, Tony Gonzalez, 1997-2013
- Most pass receptions, season, tight end: 126, Trey McBride, 2025
- Most pass receptions, career, running back: 767, Marshall Faulk, 1994-2005
- Most pass receptions, season, running back: 116, Christian McCaffrey, 2019
- Most pass receptions, game: 21, Brandon Marshall, December 13, 2009
- Most pass receptions, game, rookie: 15, Puka Nacua, September 17, 2023
- Most pass receptions, half: 13, Jason Witten, October 28, 2012
- Highest reception average per game, career: 7.1, Puka Nacua, (313 receptions/44 games), 2023–2025
- Highest reception average per game, season: 9.31, Michael Thomas, (149 receptions/16 games), 2019
- Most consecutive games, 1+ pass receptions: 274, Jerry Rice 1985–2004
- Most consecutive seasons, 50+ pass receptions: 17, Larry Fitzgerald 2004–2020
- Most consecutive seasons, 100+ pass receptions: 6, Antonio Brown 2013–2018
- Most seasons, 50+ pass receptions: 17, Jerry Rice 1986–2003, Larry Fitzgerald 2004–2020
- Most seasons, 100+ pass receptions: 6, Brandon Marshall 2007–2015, Antonio Brown 2013–2018
- Most seasons, 120+ pass receptions: 2, Ja'Marr Chase 2024–2025, Michael Thomas 2018–2019, Antonio Brown 2014–2015, Wes Welker 2009–2011, Cris Carter 1994–1995
- Most games, 10+ pass receptions, season: 9, Michael Thomas 2019
- Most games, 15+ pass receptions, season: 2, Antonio Brown 2015
- Most games, 1+ reception, career: 296, Jerry Rice 1985–2004
- Most games, 5+ receptions, career: 166, Jerry Rice 1985–2004
- Most games, 10+ receptions, career: 23, Antonio Brown 2010–2021
- Most games, 15+ receptions, career: 2, Brandon Marshall 2008–2018, Wes Welker 2009–2014, Jason Witten 2007–2017, Antonio Brown 2010–2015

=== Yards receiving ===
- Most seasons leading league: 7, Don Hutson, 1936, 1938–39, 1941–1944
- Most consecutive seasons leading league: 4, Don Hutson, 1941–1944
- Most receiving yards, career: 22,895, Jerry Rice 1985–2004
- Most receiving yards per game average, career: 95.3, Puka Nacua, (4,191 yards/44 games), 2023–present
- Most receiving yards per game average, season: 129.0, Wes Chandler, (1,032 yards/8 games), 1982
- Most receiving yards per game average, rookie season: 108.8, Odell Beckham Jr., (1,305 yards/12 Games), 2014
- Most seasons 500 or more yards receiving: 18, Jerry Rice 1985–2003
- Most seasons 1,000 or more yards receiving: 14, Jerry Rice, 1986–2002
- Most seasons 1,500 or more yards receiving: 4, Jerry Rice 1986–1995
- Most consecutive seasons 500 or more yards receiving: 16, Tony Gonzalez 1998–2013; Larry Fitzgerald 2004–2019
- Most consecutive seasons 1,000 or more yards receiving: 11, Jerry Rice 1986–1996; Mike Evans 2014-Present
- Most consecutive seasons 1,500 or more yards receiving: 2, Marvin Harrison 2001–2002, Andre Johnson 2008–2009, Calvin Johnson 2011–2012, Antonio Brown 2014–2015, Julio Jones 2014–2015
- Most consecutive seasons, 1,000+ receiving yards, TE: 7, Travis Kelce 2016–2022
- Most receiving yards, season: 1,964, Calvin Johnson, 2012
- Most receiving yards, two seasons, to start a career: 3,016, Justin Jefferson, 2020–2021
- Most receiving yards, rookie, season: 1,486, Puka Nacua, 2023.
- Most receiving yards, season, TE: 1,416, Travis Kelce, 2020
- Most receiving yards, season, RB: 1,048, Marshall Faulk, 1999
- Most receiving yards, game: 336, Flipper Anderson, November 26, 1989 (OT)
- Most receiving yards, regulation game: 329, Calvin Johnson, October 27, 2013
- Most receiving yards, game, rookie: 266, Ja’Marr Chase, January 2, 2022
- Most receiving yards, game, TE: 214, Shannon Sharpe, October 20, 2002
- Most receiving yards, one half: 258, Stephone Paige, December 22, 1985
- Most receiving yards, one quarter: 210, Qadry Ismail, December 12, 1999
- Most games, 50+ receiving yards, career: 198, Jerry Rice, 1985–2004
- Most games, 100+ receiving yards, career: 76, Jerry Rice, 1985–2004
- Most games, 150+ receiving yards, career: 30, Jerry Rice, 1985–2003
- Most games, 200+ receiving yards, career: 5; Lance Alworth, 1963–1967; Calvin Johnson, 2007–2015
- Most games, 250+ receiving yards, career: 3; Julio Jones, 2014–17
- Most games, 50+ receiving yards, season: 17, Cooper Kupp, 2021
- Most games, 100+ receiving yards, season: 11, Michael Irvin 1995, Calvin Johnson 2012
- Most games, 150+ receiving yards, season: 5; Tim Brown, 1997; Jerry Rice, 1995; Roy Green, 1984; Antonio Brown, 2017;
- Most games, 200+ receiving yards, season: 3, Charley Hennigan (AFL), 1961
- Most consecutive games, 50+ receiving yards: 35, Antonio Brown 2013–2015
- Most consecutive games, 100+ receiving yards: 8, Calvin Johnson 2012, Adam Thielen 2018
- Most consecutive games, 125+ receiving yards: 6, A. J. Brown 2023
- Most consecutive games, 150+ receiving yards: 3, CeeDee Lamb 2023, Josh Gordon 2013, Isaac Bruce 1995, Andre Rison 1990, Roy Green 1984, James Lofton 1984, Don Maynard 1968
- Most consecutive games, 200+ receiving yards: 2, Josh Gordon 2013
- Fewest games to reach 6,000 receiving yards, TE: 91, Travis Kelce
- Fewest games to reach 8,000 receiving yards, TE: 113, Travis Kelce
- Fewest games to reach 9,000 receiving yards, TE: 127, Travis Kelce
- Fewest games to reach 10,000 receiving yards, TE: 140, Travis Kelce
- Fewest games to reach 12,000 receiving yards, TE: 172, Travis Kelce
- Longest pass reception (see also 99-yard pass play): 99, by 12 players, most recently Victor Cruz, December 24, 2011

=== Average yards/reception ===
- Highest yards/reception, career (minimum 200 receptions): 22.26 (4,996 yards / 224 receptions), Homer Jones, 1964–70
- Highest yards/reception, season (minimum 24 receptions): 32.58 (782 yards / 24 receptions), Don Currivan, 1947
- Highest yards/reception, game (minimum 3 receptions): 63.00 (189 yards / 3 receptions), Torry Holt, September 24, 2000

=== Receiving touchdowns ===
- Most seasons led league: 9, Don Hutson, 1935–1938, 1940–1944
- Most consecutive seasons led league: 5, Don Hutson, 1940–1944
- Most touchdowns, career: 197, Jerry Rice, 1985–2004
- Most touchdowns, season: 23, Randy Moss, 2007
- Most touchdowns for a TE, season; 17, Rob Gronkowski, 2011
- Most touchdowns for a RB, season; 9, Billy Cannon, 1961; Bill Brown, 1964; Chuck Foreman, 1975; Leroy Hoard, 1991; Marshall Faulk, 2001
- Most touchdowns, rookie season: 17, Randy Moss, 1998
- Most touchdowns, season, home: 13, Jerry Rice, 1987; Marvin Harrison, 2001; Jordy Nelson, 2011
- Most touchdowns, season, away: 14, Randy Moss, 2007
- Most touchdowns, back-to-back games: 7, Cloyce Box, November 23, 1950 – December 3, 1950
- Most touchdowns, game: 5, Bob Shaw, October 2, 1950, Jerry Rice, October 14, 1990; Kellen Winslow, November 22, 1981
- Most touchdowns, one half: 4, Don Hutson, October 7, 1945; Dante Lavelli, October 14, 1949; Bob Shaw, October 2, 1950; Harold Jackson, October 14, 1973; Paul Warfield December 15, 1973; Ahmad Rashad, September 2, 1979; Roy Green, November 13, 1983; Mark Ingram, November 27, 1994; Marcus Robinson, November 23, 2003; Randy Moss, November 18, 2007
- Most touchdowns, one quarter: 4, Don Hutson, October 7, 1945
- Most consecutive games, 1+ TD receptions: 13, Jerry Rice, 1986–1987
- Most games 1+ TD receptions, career: 139, Jerry Rice, 1985–2004
- Most games 1+ TD receptions, season: 13, Mark Clayton, 1984; Jerry Rice, 1989; Carl Pickens, 1995; Randy Moss, 2007
- Most consecutive seasons, 1+ TD receptions: 20, Jerry Rice, 1985–2004
- Most consecutive seasons, 5+ TD receptions: 11, Terrell Owens, 2000–2010; Marvin Harrison, 1996–2006; Cris Carter, 1991–2001; Tim Brown, 1991–2001; Jerry Rice, 1986–1996; Don Hutson, 1935–1945
- Most consecutive seasons, 10+ TD receptions: 8, Marvin Harrison, 1999–2006
- Most seasons with at least 1 touchdown reception: 20, Jerry Rice
- Most seasons with at least 5 touchdown receptions: 16, Jerry Rice
- Most seasons with at least 10 touchdown receptions: 9, Jerry Rice; Randy Moss
- Most seasons with at least 15 touchdown receptions: 5, Jerry Rice
- Most seasons with at least 20 touchdown receptions: 1, Randy Moss, Jerry Rice
- Most touchdown receptions, 20+ yards, game 4, Cloyce Box, March 12, 1950; Art Powell, Dec 22, 1963; Wesley Walker, Sep 21, 1986
- Fewest games to reach 50 career touchdown receptions: 54, Lance Alworth 1962–1966

== Yards from scrimmage ==
- Most seasons leading the league in yards from scrimmage, 6 Jim Brown, 1958–1959, 1961, 1963–1965
- Most consecutive seasons leading the league in yards from scrimmage, 4 Thurman Thomas, 1989–1992
- Most yards from scrimmage, career: 23,540, Jerry Rice, 1985–2004
- Most yards from scrimmage, season: 2,509, Chris Johnson, 2009
- Most yards from scrimmage, no fumbles, season: 2,189, Marshall Faulk, 2000
- Most yards from scrimmage, rookie, season: 2,212, Eric Dickerson, 1983
- Highest average yards from scrimmage per game, career (100 games): 125.52, Jim Brown (14,811 yards/118 games), 1957–1965
- Highest average yards from scrimmage per game, season: 163.36, Priest Holmes (2,237 yards/14 games), 2002
- Most attempts, season: 492, (407 rushes, 85 receptions), James Wilder Sr., 1984
- Most attempts, rookie, season: 441, (390 rushes, 51 receptions), Eric Dickerson, 1983
- Most attempts, no fumbles, season: 430 (397 rushes, 33 receptions), Gerald Riggs, 1985
- Most combined attempts, game: 48, James Wilder Sr. (42 rushes, 6 receptions), October 30, 1983, and LaDainian Tomlinson (37 rushes, 11 receptions), December 1, 2002 (OT)
- Most yards from scrimmage, game: 336, (all receiving yards), Flipper Anderson, November 26, 1989 (OT)
- Most yards from scrimmage, regulation game: 330, Billy Cannon, December 10, 1961
- Most yards from scrimmage, back-to-back games: 525, Walter Payton, November 20, 1977 – November 24, 1977
- Most games, 50 yards from scrimmage, career: 202, Jerry Rice 1985–2004
- Most games, 100 yards from scrimmage, career: 108, Walter Payton, 1975–1987
- Most games, 150 yards from scrimmage, career: 46, Barry Sanders, 1989–1998
- Most games, 200 yards from scrimmage, career: 14, Marshall Faulk, 1994–2005
- Most games, 250 yards from scrimmage, career: 5, Marshall Faulk, 1994–2005
- Most games, 100 yards from scrimmage, season: 15, Marcus Allen, 1985; Barry Sanders, 1997; Edgerrin James, 2000; David Johnson 2016
- Most games, 150 yards from scrimmage, season: 10, Chris Johnson, 2009
- Most games, 200 yards from scrimmage, season: 5, LaDainian Tomlinson, 2003
- Most games, 250 yards from scrimmage, season: 2, Marshall Faulk, 2000
- Most consecutive games, 100 yards from scrimmage: 17, Marcus Allen, 1985–1986
- Most consecutive games, 200 yards from scrimmage: 3, Le'Veon Bell, November 17, 2014, November 30, 2014, December 7, 2014; Walter Payton, November 13, 1977, November 20, 1977, November 24, 1977
- Most consecutive seasons, 500 or more yards from scrimmage: 16, Tony Gonzalez, 1998–2013
- Most seasons, 500 or more yards from scrimmage: 18, Jerry Rice, 1985–1996, 1998–2003
- Most consecutive seasons, 1000 or more yards from scrimmage: 13, Emmitt Smith, 1990–2002
- Most seasons, 1000 or more yards from scrimmage: 14, Emmitt Smith 1990–2002, 2004, Jerry Rice 1986–1996, 1998, 2001–2002
- Most consecutive seasons, 1500 or more yards from scrimmage: 8, LaDainian Tomlinson, 2001–2008
- Most seasons, 1500 or more yards from scrimmage: 10, Walter Payton 1976–1981, 1983–1986
- Most consecutive seasons, 2000 or more yards from scrimmage: 4, Marshall Faulk 1998–2001
- Most seasons, 2000 or more yards from scrimmage: 4, Marshall Faulk 1998–2001, Eric Dickerson 1983–1984, 1986, 1988, Walter Payton 1977, 1983–1985

== All-purpose ==
All-purpose yardage (or combined net yards gained) encompasses rushing, receiving, interception returns, punt returns, kickoff returns and fumble returns.

- Most seasons leading league, combined net yards: 5, Jim Brown, 1958–1961, 1964
- Most consecutive seasons leading league, combined net yards: 4, Jim Brown, 1958–1961

=== All-purpose attempts ===
- Most combined attempts, career: 4,939, Emmitt Smith (4,409 rushes, 515 receptions, 15 fumble returns), 1990–2004
- Most combined attempts, season: 492, James Wilder Sr. (407 rushes, 85 receptions, 0 returns), 1984
- Most combined attempts, no fumbles, season: 430, Gerald Riggs (397 rushes, 33 receptions), 1985
- Most combined attempts, rookie, season: 441, Eric Dickerson (390 rushes, 51 receptions, 0 returns), 1983
- Most combined attempts per fumble, career, minimum 2,000 attempts: 138.0, Curtis Martin, 1995–2005
- Most combined attempts per fumble, career, minimum 1,000 attempts: 199.88, Ray Rice, 2008–2013
- Most consecutive combined attempts, no fumbles: 870, Steven Jackson (755 rushes, 115 receptions), November 3, 2011 – January 3, 2016 (end of career)
- Most combined attempts, no fumbles, career: 446, Darnay Scott (408 receptions, 22 rushes, 15 kickoff returns, 1 fumble return), 1994–2002
- Most consecutive combined attempts, no fumbles to start a career: 589, BenJarvus Green-Ellis (559 rushes, 30 receptions), 2008–2012
- Most combined attempts, game: 48, James Wilder Sr. (42 rushes, 6 receptions), on October 30, 1983, and LaDainian Tomlinson (37 rushes, 11 receptions), on December 1, 2002 (OT)

=== All-purpose yards ===
- Most yards gained, career: 23,546, Jerry Rice, 1985–2004
- Most yards gained, total, season: 2,696, Darren Sproles, 2011
- Highest average yards per game, season: 175.9, Terry Metcalf (2,462 yards/13 games), 1975
- Highest average yards per game, career: 138.8, Gale Sayers (9,435 yards/68 games), 1965–1971
- Most yards gained, total, season, home: 1,508, Chris Johnson, 2009
- Most yards gained, total, season, away: 1,455, Timmy Brown, 1962
- Most yards gained, total, rookie, season: 2,317, Tim Brown, 1988
- Most yards gained, no fumbles, season: 2,215, Le'Veon Bell, 2014
- Most yards gained, total, game: 404, Glyn Milburn; December 10, 1995
- Most games, 50 yards gained, career: 202, Jerry Rice 1985–2004
- Most games, 100 yards gained, career: 118, Brian Mitchell 1990–2003
- Most games, 150 yards gained, career: 46, Walter Payton 1975–1986, Barry Sanders 1989–1998
- Most games, 200 yards gained, career: 17, Darren Sproles 2007–2019
- Most games, 250 yards gained, career: 7, Terry Metcalf 1974–1977
- Most games, 300 yards gained, career: 2, Jacoby Ford 2010, Josh Cribbs 2007–2009, Adrian Peterson 2007, Lionel James 1985, Gale Sayers 1965–1966
- Most games, 1 yard gained, season: 17, Dexter Carter 1995
- Most games, 100 yards gained, season: 15, David Johnson 2016, Michael Lewis 2002, Edgerrin James 2000, MarTay Jenkins 2000, Derrick Mason 2000, Barry Sanders 1997, Marcus Allen 1985
- Most games, 150 yards gained, season: 11, Michael Lewis 2002, Terry Metcalf 1975, Darren Sproles 2011
- Most games, 200 yards gained, season: 5, Fred Jackson 2009, Josh Cribbs 2009, LaDainian Tomlinson 2003, Walter Payton 1977, Timmy Brown 1962, Terry Metcalf 1975
- Most games, 250 yards gained, season: 3, Timmy Brown 1962, Lionel James 1985, Terry Metcalf 1977
- Most games, 300 yards gained, season: 2, Jacoby Ford 2010, Adrian Peterson 2007, Lionel James 1985
- Most consecutive games, 100 or more yards: 23, Gale Sayers, 1965–1967
- Most consecutive games, 200 or more yards: 4, Darren Sproles, 2008–2009
- Most consecutive seasons, 1000 or more yards: 13, Emmitt Smith, 1990–2002
- Most seasons, 1000 or more yards: 14, Emmitt Smith 1990–2002, 2004, Jerry Rice 1986–1996, 1998, 2001–2002
- Most consecutive seasons, 1500 or more yards: 9, Brian Mitchell, 1994–2002
- Most seasons, 1500 or more yards: 10, Walter Payton 1976–1981, 1983–1986
- Most consecutive seasons, 2000 or more yards: 4, Marshall Faulk 1998–2001; Dante Hall 2002–2005; Darren Sproles 2008–2011
- Most seasons, 2000 or more yards: 4, Walter Payton 1977, 1983–1985; Eric Dickerson 1983–1984, 1986, 1988; Brian Mitchell 1994–1995, 1997–1998; Marshall Faulk 1998–2001; Dante Hall 2002–2005; Tiki Barber 2000, 2004–2006; Darren Sproles 2008–2011

== Interceptions ==
- Most seasons leading league: 3; Everson Walls, 1981–1982, 1985; Ed Reed, 2004, 2008, 2010
- Most interceptions, career: 81, Paul Krause, 1964–1979
- Most interceptions, season: 14, Dick "Night Train" Lane, 1952
- Most interceptions, rookie, season: 14, Dick "Night Train" Lane, 1952
- Most interceptions, game: 4, by 19 players, most recently DeAngelo Hall, October 24, 2010
- Most interceptions, one half: 4, DeAngelo Hall, October 24, 2010
- Most consecutive games with an interception: 8, Tom Morrow, 1962–1963
- Most consecutive seasons with an interception: 19, Darrell Green, Washington Redskins, 1983–2001

=== Interception return yards ===
- Most seasons leading league: 3, Darren Sharper, 2002, 2005, 2009
- Most interception return yards, career: 1,590, Ed Reed, 2002–2013
- Most yards per interception return, career (minimum 30 interceptions): 25.1 (1,331 yards/53 INTS), Deion Sanders, 1989–2000, 2004–2005
- Most yards per interception return, career (minimum 20 interceptions): 27.6 (608 yards/22 INTS), Erik McMillan, 1989–1993
- Most interception return yards, season: 376, Darren Sharper, New Orleans Saints, 2009
- Most interception return yards, rookie, season: 301, Don Doll, Detroit Lions, 1949
- Most interception return yards, game: 177, Charlie McNeil, September 24, 1961
- Longest interception return: 108, Ed Reed, November 23, 2008

=== Interception return touchdowns ===
- Most interceptions returned for touchdowns, career: 12, Rod Woodson, 1987–2003
- Most interceptions returned for touchdowns, season: 5, DaRon Bland, 2023
- Most interceptions returned for touchdowns, rookie, season: 3; Lem Barney, 1967; Ronnie Lott, 1981; Janoris Jenkins 2012
- Most interceptions returned for touchdowns, game: 2, by 30 players, most recently Zach Brown, December 30, 2012
- Most consecutive seasons with an interception returned for a touchdown: 6, Charles Woodson, Green Bay Packers, 2006–2011

== Punting ==
- Most seasons leading league: 4, Sammy Baugh, 1940–43; Jerrel Wilson, 1965, 1968, 1972–73
- Most consecutive seasons leading league: 4, Sammy Baugh, 1940–43

=== Punts ===
- Most punts, career: 1,713, Jeff Feagles 1988–2009
- Most punts, season: 114, Bob Parsons, 1981 and Chad Stanley, 2002
- Most punts, rookie, season: 111, Brad Maynard 1997
- Most punts, game: 16, Leo Araguz on October 11, 1998
- Longest punt: 98 yards, Steve O'Neal on September 21, 1969

=== Punting yards ===
- Most punting yardage, career: 71,211, Jeff Feagles, 1988–2009
- Most punting yardage, season: 5,209, Dave Zastudil, 2012
- Most punting yardage, rookie, season: 4,779, Ryan Stonehouse, 2022
- Most punting yardage, game: 709, Leo Araguz on October 11, 1998

=== Average punting yards ===
- Highest average, punting, career (minimum 250 punts): 48.5, (271 punts/13,132 yards), Blake Gillikin, 2020–2025, (445 punts/21,572 yards), AJ Cole
- Highest average, punting, season (among qualified players): 53.10 (90 punts/4,779 yards), Ryan Stonehouse, 2022
- Highest average, punting, rookie, season (among qualified players): 53.10 (90 punts/4,779 yards), Ryan Stonehouse, 2022
- Highest average, punting, game (minimum 4 punts): 61.75 (4 punts/247 yards), Bob Cifers on Nov 24, 1946

=== Average net punting yards ===
Net average has been compiled since 1976.

- Highest net average, career (minimum 250 punts): 41.1 (488 punts for 22,497 net yards), Pat McAfee, 2009–2016
- Highest net average, season (among qualified players): 44.23 (78 punts for 3,450 net yards), John Hekker, 2013
- Highest net average, rookie, season (among qualified players): 40.85 (92 punts for 3,758 net yards), Bryan Anger, 2012
- Highest net average game (minimum 4 punts): 59.50 (4 punts for 238 net yards), Rohn Stark on September 13, 1992

=== Punts had blocked ===
- Most consecutive punts, none blocked: 1,177, Chris Gardocki, 1992–2006
- Most punts had blocked, career: 14; Herman Weaver, 1970–80; Harry Newsome, 1985–93
- Most punts had blocked, season: 6, Harry Newsome, 1988

=== Punts inside the 20 ===
Punts inside the 20 have been compiled since 1976.

- Most punts inside the 20, career: 554, Jeff Feagles, 1988–2009
- Most punts inside the 20, season: 46, Dave Zastudil, 2012
- Most punts inside the 20, game: 8; Mark Royals on November 6, 1994; Bryan Barker on November 14, 1999

== Punt returns ==
=== Punt return attempts ===
- Most seasons leading league in number of punt returns: 3, Les "Speedy" Duncan, 1965–66, 1971; Rick Upchurch, 1976, 1978, 1982
- Most punt returns, career: 463, Brian Mitchell, 1990–2003
- Most punt returns, season: 70, Danny Reece, 1979
- Most punt returns, rookie, season: 57, Lew Barnes, 1986
- Most punt returns, game: 11, Eddie Brown on October 9, 1977

=== Fair catches ===
- Most fair catches, career: 231, Brian Mitchell, 1990–2003
- Most fair catches, season: 36, Jeremy Kerley, 2012
- Most fair catches, game: 7; Bake Turner on November 20, 1966, Lem Barney on November 21, 1976, Bobby Morse on December 27, 1987, and Chris Carr on November 16, 2008

=== Punt return yards ===
- Most seasons leading league: 3, Alvin Haymond, 1965–66, 1969
- Most yards gained, career: 4,999, Brian Mitchell, 1990–2003
- Most yards gained, season: 875, Desmond Howard, 1996
- Most yards gained, rookie, season: 699, Patrick Peterson, Arizona Cardinals, 2011
- Most yards gained, game: 207, LeRoy Irvin on October 11, 1981
- Longest punt return: 103, Robert Bailey on October 23, 1994

=== Average punt return yards ===
- Highest average yardage, career (minimum 75 returns): 14.3 (79 returns for 1,132 yards), Marcus Jones (cornerback), 2022–2025
- Highest average yardage, season (among qualified players): 23.00, Herb Rich, 1950
- Highest average yardage, highest average, season, rookie (among qualified players): 23.00, Herb Rich, 1950
- Highest average yardage, game (minimum 3 returns): 53.33, Darius Reynaud on December 30, 2012

=== Punt return touchdowns ===
- Most punts returned for touchdown, career: 14 Devin Hester; Chicago Bears, 2006–2013, Atlanta Falcons, 2014–2015
- Most punts returned for touchdown, season: 4; Jack Christiansen, 1951; Rick Upchurch, 1976; Devin Hester, 2007; Patrick Peterson, 2011
- Most punts returned for touchdown, rookie, season: 4, Jack Christiansen, 1951; Patrick Peterson, 2011
- Most punts returned for touchdown, game: 2, 16 times by 13 players, most recently Darius Reynaud on December 30, 2012
- Most games with two or more punts returned for touchdowns: 2; Jack Christiansen October 14, 1951, and November 22, 1951; Eric Metcalf October 24, 1993, and November 2, 1997; Jermaine Lewis December 7, 1997, and December 24, 2000

== Kickoff returns ==
=== Kickoff return attempts ===
- Most seasons leading league: 3, Abe Woodson, 1959, 1962–63
- Most kickoff returns, career: 607, Brian Mitchell, 1990–2003
- Most kickoff returns, season: 82, MarTay Jenkins, 2000
- Most kickoff returns, rookie, season: 73; Josh Scobey 2003; Chris Carr, 2005
- Most kickoff returns, game: 10, Desmond Howard on October 26, 1997 and Richard Alston on November 28, 2004

=== Kickoff return yards ===
- Most seasons leading league: 3; Bruce Harper, 1977–1979; Tyrone Hughes, 1994–1996
- Most yards gained, career: 14,014, Brian Mitchell, 1990–2003
- Most yards gained, season: 2,186, MarTay Jenkins, 2000
- Most yards gained, rookie, season: 1,752, Chris Carr, 2005
- Most yards gained, game: 304, Tyrone Hughes on October 23, 1994
- Longest kickoff return: 109 yards, Cordarrelle Patterson on October 27, 2013

=== Average kickoff return yards ===
- Highest average, career (minimum 75 returns): 30.56 (91 returns for 2,781 yards), Gale Sayers, 1965–1971
- Highest average, season (among qualified players): 41.06 (18 returns for 739 yards), Travis Williams, 1967
- Highest average, rookie, season (among qualified players): 41.06 (18 returns for 739 yards), Travis Williams, 1967
- Highest average, game (minimum 3 returns): 73.50 (4 returns for 294 yards), Wally Triplett on October 29, 1950

=== Kickoff return touchdowns ===
- Most touchdowns, career: 9, Cordarrelle Patterson, 2013–2022
- Most touchdowns, season: 4; Travis Williams, 1967; Cecil Turner, 1970
- Most touchdowns, rookie season: 4, Travis Williams, 1967
- Kickoff returns, most touchdowns, game: 2; by 11 players, most recently Nyheim Hines on January 8, 2023
- Kickoff returns, most touchdowns, quarter: 2; Travis Williams, 1967 Green Bay Packers vs. Cleveland Browns

== Combined kick/punt returns ==
- Most seasons leading the league in combined returns: 3, Vai Sikahema, 1987, 1989, 1992
- Most combined kick returns, career: 1,070 (463 punt, 607 kickoff), Brian Mitchell, 1990–2003
- Most combined kick returns, season: 114; Michael Lewis, 2002 (44 punt, 70 kickoff); B. J. Sams, 2004 (55 punt, 59 kickoff)
- Most combined kick returns, rookie, season: 114 (55 punt, 59 kickoff), B. J. Sams, 2004
- Most combined kick returns, game: 13; Stump Mitchell on October 18, 1981 (6 punt, 7 kickoff) and Ronnie Harris on December 5, 1993 (10 punt, 3 kickoff)

=== Kick/punt return yards ===
- Most seasons leading the league in combined return yards: 3, Tyrone Hughes 1993, 1995, 1996; Mel Gray 1990–1992, Vai Sikahema, 1986–1987, 1989
- Most consecutive seasons leading the league in combined return yards: 3, Mel Gray 1990–1992
- Most yards returned, career: 19,013 (4,999 punt, 14,014 kickoff), Brian Mitchell, 1990–2003
- Most yards returned, season: 2,432 (625 punt, 1,807 kickoff), Michael Lewis, 2002
- Most yards returned, rookie, season: 1,938, Chris Carr, 2005
- Most yards returned, game: 347 (43 punt, 304 kickoff), Tyrone Hughes on October 23, 1994

=== Kick/punt return touchdowns ===
- Most touchdowns, career: 19 (14 punt, 5 kickoff), Devin Hester, 2006–2014
- Most touchdowns, season: 6 (4 punt, 2 kickoff), Devin Hester, 2007
- Most touchdowns, rookie, season: 5 (3 punt, 2 kickoff), Devin Hester, 2006
- Most touchdowns, game (any combination of kickoff and punt returns): 2; 39 times by 33 players, most recently Nyheim Hines on January 8, 2023 (2 kickoffs)
- Most touchdowns, game (with both a kickoff and a punt for a TD) : 2; by 13 players, most recently Jeremy Ross on December 8, 2013

== Fumbles ==
- Most fumbles, career: 166, Brett Favre, 1991–2010
- Most fumbles, season: 23; Kerry Collins, 2001; Daunte Culpepper, 2002
- Most fumbles, game: 7, Len Dawson, November 15, 1964

=== Fumbles recovered ===
- Most fumbles recovered, career, own and opponents' : 56 (all own), Warren Moon, 1984–2000
- Most fumbles recovered, season, own and opponents' : 12 (all own), David Carr, 2002
- Most fumbles recovered, game, own and opponents' : 4,

Otto Graham on October 25, 1953 (all own)
Sam Etcheverry on September 17, 1961 (all own)
Roman Gabriel on October 12, 1969 (all own)
Joe Ferguson on September 18, 1977 (all own)
Randall Cunningham on November 30, 1986 (all own)
Tony Romo on September 26, 2011 (all own)
Patrick Peterson on September 30, 2012 (3 own, 1 opponent's)
Matthew Stafford on 2013 (all own)

=== Opponent fumbles recovered ===
- Most opponents' fumbles recovered, career: 30; Jim Marshall, 1960–1979
- Most opponents' fumbles recovered, season: 9, Don Hultz, 1963
- Most opponents' fumbles recovered, game: 3, by 15 players, most recently Brian Young, November 9, 2003

=== Fumble return yards ===
- Longest fumble return: 104; Jack Tatum, September 24, 1972; Aeneas Williams, November 5, 2000
- Fumble return yards, career: 328, DeAngelo Hall 2004–2017
- Fumble return yards, season: 157, Dwayne Rudd, 1998
- Fumble return yards, rookie season: 98, Toby Wright, 1994
- Fumble return yards, game: 104; Jack Tatum, September 24, 1972; Aeneas Williams, November 5, 2000

=== Fumble return touchdowns ===
- Most fumble return touchdowns, career (total): 6, Jason Taylor; 1997–2011
- Most fumble return touchdowns, season (total): 2; by 41 players, most recently Bobby Wagner 2015
- Most fumble return touchdowns, game (total): 2, Jeremy Chinn, November 29, 2020; Fred "Dippy" Evans, November 28, 1948; Al Nesser, October 3, 1920^{α}
- Most fumble return touchdowns, career (own recovered): 2; by 9 players, most recently Kevin Curtis 2003–2010
- Most fumble return touchdowns, season (own recovered): 2; Ahmad Rashad, 1974; Del Rodgers, 1982, Kevin Curtis 2007
- Most fumble return touchdowns, career (opponents' recovered): 6, Jason Taylor; 1997–2011
- Most fumble return touchdowns, season (opponents' recovered): 2; by 38 Players, most recently Bobby Wagner 2015
- Most fumble return touchdowns, game (opponents' recovered): 2, Jeremy Chinn, November 29, 2020; Fred "Dippy" Evans, November 28, 1948; Al Nesser, October 3, 1920^{α}

=== Fumbles forced ===
Note: Forced fumbles are not an official NFL statistic and unofficial numbers prior to 1981 are not available.

- Most fumbles forced, career: 54; Robert Mathis, 2003–2016
- Most fumbles forced, season: 10; Osi Umenyiora, 2010; Charles Tillman, 2012
- Most fumbles forced, game: 4; Charles Tillman,

== Tackles ==
- Most solo tackles, career: 1,568, Ray Lewis, 1996–2012
- Most solo tackles, season: 156, Ray Lewis, 1997
- Most solo tackles, game: 20, David Harris, 2007
- Most combined tackles, career: 2,059, Ray Lewis, 1996–2012
- Most combined tackles, season: 214, Hardy Nickerson, 1993
- Most combined tackles, game: 24, David Harris, 2007, Luke Kuechly, 2013
- Most tackles for loss, career: 202, Terrell Suggs, 2003-2019
- Most tackles for loss, season: 39, J. J. Watt, 2012
- Most tackles for loss, game: 6, Joey Bosa, 2020, Aaron Donald, 2018, J. J. Watt, 2012/2015, Andre Carter, 2009, Jeremiah Trotter, 2001

== Sacks ==
Quarterback sack statistics have been compiled (officially) since 1982

- Most seasons leading league: 3;

T. J. Watt, 2020–2021, 2023

- Most consecutive seasons leading league: 2;

Mark Gastineau, 1983–1984
Reggie White, 1987–1988
T. J. Watt, 2020–2021

- Most sacks, career: 200, Bruce Smith, 1985–2003
- Most sacks, season: 23, Myles Garrett, 2025
- Most sacks, rookie, season: 14.5, Jevon Kearse, 1999
- Most sacks, game: 7.0, Derrick Thomas on November 11, 1990
- Most seasons, 1+ sacks: 19, Bruce Smith, 1985–2003
- Most seasons, 10+ sacks: 13, Bruce Smith, 1986–1990, 1992–1998, 2000
- Most consecutive seasons, 10+ sacks: 9, Reggie White, 1985–1993
- Most consecutive games, sack: 11, Chris Jones, 2018
- Most seasons, 20+ sacks: 2, J. J. Watt, 2012, 2014

== Overtime records ==
- Most overtime field goals, career: 11, Adam Vinatieri 1996–2017
- Longest overtime field goal: 59 yards, Chandler Catanzaro vs. Cleveland Browns on October 21, 2018
- Most overtime touchdowns, career: 3, LaDainian Tomlinson 2001–2011
- Most overtime rushing touchdowns, career: 3, LaDainian Tomlinson 2001–2011
- Most overtime touchdown passes, career: 4, Drew Bledsoe 1993–2006
- Longest overtime touchdown pass/reception: 99 yards, Ron Jaworski to Mike Quick, Philadelphia Eagles vs. Atlanta Falcons November 10, 1985
- Longest overtime rushing touchdown: 96 yards, Garrison Hearst, San Francisco 49ers vs. New York Jets September 6, 1998
- Longest overtime interception returned for a touchdown: 72 yards, Lorenzo Lynch, Arizona Cardinals vs. Seattle Seahawks October 29, 1995
- Longest overtime kickoff returned for a touchdown: 96 yards, Chad Morton, New York Jets vs. Buffalo Bills September 8, 2002
- Longest overtime fumble returned for a touchdown: 52 yards, Johnie Cooks, Baltimore Colts vs. New England Patriots September 4, 1983
- Longest overtime punt returned for a touchdown: 99 yards, Patrick Peterson, Arizona Cardinals vs. St. Louis Rams November 6, 2011
- Most passing yards: 219, Derek Carr, Oakland Raiders vs. Tampa Bay Buccaneers on October 30, 2016

== Miscellaneous ==
- Most return (of a punt, kickoff, interception, fumble, missed field goal, blocked punt/field goal) touchdowns: 20, Devin Hester 2006–2016
- Most return (of a punt, kick, interception or fumble) touchdowns, including postseason: 21, Devin Hester 2006–2016
- Longest play for a TD: 109 yards, Antonio Cromartie on November 4, 2007 (return of a missed field goal), Cordarrelle Patterson on October 27, 2013 (kickoff return), Jamal Agnew on September 26, 2021 (return of a missed field goal)
- Most blocked kicks (field goals/PATs/punts): 25, Ted Hendricks, 1969–1983
- Longest return of a missed field goal: 109 yards, Antonio Cromartie on November 4, 2007, Jamal Agnew on September 26, 2021
- Most missed field goal returns for touchdowns: 2, Al Nelson 1965–1973, Carl Taseff 1951–1962
- Longest return of a blocked field goal: 94 yards, Bobby Smith on October 25, 1964
- Most blocked field goal returns for touchdowns: 2, Kyle Arrington 2010–2014, Nate Clements 2008–2009, Kevin Ross 1987–1995
- Longest return of a blocked punt: 67 yards, on Frank Filchock September 28, 1941
- Most blocked punt returns for touchdowns: 3, Ed Reed 2002–2013, Tom Flynn 1984–1988
- Oldest player: 48, George Blanda, 1975
- Only players to throw and catch a pass for a touchdown in the same play: 3 yards, Brad Johnson on October 12, 1997; 37 yards, Frank Ryan on October 30, 1960; 6 yards, Marcus Mariota on January 6, 2018 (playoff game)
- Players to throw 30+ touchdowns and 30+ interceptions in the same season: Jameis Winston 2019
- Most blocked field goals, season: 10, Bob St. Clair 1956
- Most converted extra points, game: 10, Jason Sanders 2023

== Oldest firsts ==
- Oldest player to kick first PAT: Doug Flutie, 43 years, 70 days
- Oldest player to kick first field goal: Mose Kelsch, 36 years, 253 days
- Oldest player to score first touchdown: Whitey Woodin, 36 years, 295 days
- Oldest player to record first reception: Sonny Jurgensen, 39 years, 66 days
- Oldest player to record first receiving yard: Charlie Cowan, 37 years, 143 days
- Oldest player to record first interception: Trace Armstrong, 37 years, 78 days
- Oldest player to throw first completion: Lou Groza, 42 years, 256 days
- Oldest player to throw first touchdown pass: Mike Horan, 39 years, 301 days
- Oldest player to attempt first pass: Mike Horan, 39 years, 301 days
- Oldest player to catch first touchdown reception: Jim Turner, 36 years, 202 days
- Oldest player to record first rushing touchdown: Butch Songin, 36 years, 158 days (AFL); Bobby Hebert, 36 years, 62 days (NFL)
- Oldest player to record first rushing attempt: Charles Woodson, 39 years, 78 days
- Oldest player to record first rushing yard: Jeff Gossett, 39 years, 304 days
- Oldest player to score first point: Bill Irgens, 39
- Oldest player to record first interception return for a touchdown: Albert Lewis, 38 years, 26 days
- Oldest player to record first punt return for a touchdown: Rod Smith, 33 years, 185 days
- Oldest player to record first kick off return for a touchdown: Johnny Blood, 33 Years, 282 days

== Age ==
=== Oldest ===
- Oldest player to have a rushing touchdown: 45 years, 151 days, Tom Brady, January 1, 2023
- Oldest player to have multiple rushing touchdowns in a game: 42 years, 68 days, Tom Brady, October 10, 2019
- Oldest player to return a punt for a touchdown: 35 years, 140 days, Tim Brown, December 9, 2001
- Oldest player to return a kickoff for a touchdown: 33 Years, 282 days, Johnny Blood, September 5, 1937
- Oldest player to return an interception for a touchdown: 38 years, 26 days, Albert Lewis, November 1, 1998
- Oldest player to return a fumble for a touchdown: 37 years, 174 days, Sam Mills, November 24, 1996
- Oldest player to return a blocked punt for a touchdown: 35 years, 124 days, Fritz Loven, October 13, 1929
- Oldest player to return a blocked punt for a touchdown (since 1930): 34 years, 319 days, Dwight Stone, December 12, 1998
- Oldest player to return a blocked field goal for a touchdown: 33 years, 323 days, Todd Lyght, December 29, 2002
- Oldest player to have a 150 yard receiving game: 41 years, 70 days, Jerry Rice, December 22, 2003
- Oldest player to have a 100 yard rushing game: 36 years, 199 days, MacArthur Lane, October 1, 1978
- Oldest player to have a touchdown reception: 42 years, 67 days, Jerry Rice, December 19, 2004
- Oldest player to have a 20 rushing attempts in a game: 37 years, 129 days, Frank Gore, September 20, 2020
- Oldest player to have a 30 rushing attempts in a game: 36 years, 84 days, John Riggins, October 27, 1985
- Oldest player to have a sack: 40 years, 282 days, Clay Matthews Jr., December 22, 1996
- Oldest player to have an interception: 41 years, 304 days, Darrell Green, December 16, 2001
- Oldest player to record a safety: 37 years, 221 days, Cameron Wake September 8, 2019
- Oldest player to record a two-point conversion: 38 years, 167 days, Antonio Gates December 2, 2018
- Oldest player to throw a touchdown pass: 47 years, 88 days, George Blanda, December 14, 1974
- Oldest player to have a 300+ yard passing game: 45 years, 151 days, Tom Brady, January 1, 2023
- Oldest player to have a 400+ yard passing game: 45 years, 151 days, Tom Brady, January 1, 2023
- Oldest player to have a 500+ yard passing game: 40 years, 185 days, Tom Brady, February 4, 2018
- Oldest player to start in a Super Bowl: 43 years 188 days, Tom Brady, February 7, 2021
- Oldest player to have a perfect passer rating (158.3): 43 years, 145 days, Tom Brady, December 26, 2020
- Oldest player to lead the league in passing touchdowns: 44 years, 159 days, Tom Brady, January 9, 2022

=== Youngest ===
- Youngest player to score a touchdown: 20 years, 53 days, Andy Livingston, December 13, 1964
- Youngest player to return a punt for a touchdown: 21 years, 19 days, Dexter McCluster, September 13, 2010
- Youngest player to return a kickoff for a touchdown: 20 years, 53 days, Andy Livingston, December 13, 1964
- Youngest player to return an interception for a touchdown: 21 years, 44 days, DeAngelo Hall, January 2, 2005
- Youngest player to return fumble for a touchdown: 21 years, 117 days, Ahmad Carroll, November 29, 2004
- Youngest player to return a blocked punt for a touchdown: 21 years, 63 days, Geno Hayes, October 12, 2008
- Youngest player to return a blocked field goal for a touchdown: 22 years, 43 days, Willie Buchanon, December 17, 1972
- Youngest player to have a 200 yard receiving game: 21 years, 87 days, Mike Evans, November 16, 2014
- Youngest player to have a touchdown reception: 20 years, 239 days, Arnie Herber, November 27, 1930
- Youngest player to have a touchdown reception since 1930: 20 years, 334 days, JuJu Smith-Schuster, October 22, 2017
- Youngest player to have a sack: 20 years, 98 days, Amobi Okoye, September 16, 2007
- Youngest player to have an interception: 20 years, 221 days, Tremaine Edmunds, December 9, 2018
- Youngest player to record a safety: 21 years, 23 days, Mike Charles, October 16, 1983
- Youngest player to record a two point conversion: 21 years, 77 days, Allen Robinson, November 9, 2014
- Youngest player to throw a touchdown pass: 20 years, 172 days, Arnie Herber, September 21, 1930
- Youngest player to throw a touchdown pass since 1950: 21 years, 89 days, Tommy Maddox, November 30, 1992
- Youngest player to have a 300+ yard passing game: 21 years, 103 days, Sam Darnold, September 16, 2018
- Youngest player to have a 400+ yard passing game: 21 years, 288 days, Matthew Stafford, November 22, 2009
- Youngest player to have a 500+ yard passing game: 23 years, 328 days, Matthew Stafford, January 1, 2012
- Youngest player to start in a Super Bowl: 21 years, 322 days, Bryan Bulaga, February 6, 2011

== Professional football firsts ==
=== Rushing ===
- First 1,000 yard rushing season: Beattie Feathers, 1,004 rushing yards, Chicago Bears, 1934
- First 1,500 yard rushing season: Jim Brown, 1,527 rushing yards, Cleveland Browns, 1958
- First 2,000 yard rushing season: O. J. Simpson, 2,003 rushing yards, Buffalo Bills, 1973
- First 2,100 yard rushing season: Eric Dickerson, 2,105 rushing yards, Los Angeles Rams, 1984
- First 15 rushing touchdown season: Steve Van Buren, 15 rushing touchdowns, Philadelphia, 1945
- First 20 rushing touchdown season: John Riggins, 24 rushing touchdowns, Washington Redskins, 1983
- First 25 rushing touchdown season: Emmitt Smith, 25 rushing touchdowns, Dallas Cowboys, 1995
- First 200 rush attempt season: Tuffy Leemans, 206 rush attempts, New York Giants, 1936
- First 300 rush attempt season: Jim Brown, 305 rush attempts, Cleveland Browns, 1961
- First 400 rush attempt season: James Wilder Sr., 407 rush attempts, Tampa Bay Buccaneers, 1984
- First 200 yard rushing game: Cliff Battles, 215 rushing yards, Boston Braves vs. New York Giants; October 8, 1933
- First 250 yard rushing game: Spec Sanders, 250 rushing yards, New York Yankees vs. Chicago Rockets; October 24, 1947
- First 5 rushing touchdown game: Jimmy Conzelman, 5 rushing touchdowns, Rock Island vs. Evansville; October 15, 1922^{α}
- First 6 rushing touchdown game: Ernie Nevers, 6 rushing touchdowns, Chicago Cardinals vs. Chicago Bears; November 28, 1929^{α}
- First 40 rushing attempt game: Lydell Mitchell, 40 rushing attempts, Baltimore Colts vs. New York Jets; October 20, 1974

=== Passing ===
- First 1,000 yard passing season: Curly Lambeau, 1,094 passing yards, Green Bay Packers, 1924^{α}
- First 1,500 yard passing season: Cecil Isbell, 2,021 passing yards, Green Bay Packers, 1942
- First 2,000 yard passing season: Cecil Isbell, 2,021 passing yards, Green Bay Packers, 1942
- First 2,500 yard passing season: Sammy Baugh, 2,938 passing yards, Washington Redskins, 1947
- First 3,000 yard passing season: Johnny Unitas, 3,099 passing yards, Baltimore Colts, 1960
- First 3,500 yard passing season: Sonny Jurgensen, 3,723 passing yards, Washington Redskins, 1961
- First 4,000 yard passing season: Joe Namath, 4,007 passing yards, New York Jets, 1967
- First 4,500 yard passing season: Dan Fouts, 4,715 passing yards, San Diego Chargers, 1980
- First 5,000 yard passing season: Dan Marino, 5,084 passing yards, Miami Dolphins, 1984
- First 300 completion season: Fran Tarkenton, 345 completions, Minnesota Vikings, 1978
- First 350 completion season: Dan Fouts, 360 completions, San Diego Chargers, 1981
- First 400 completion season: Warren Moon, 404 completions, Houston Oilers, 1991
- First 450 completion season: Peyton Manning, 450 completions, Indianapolis Colts, 2010
- First 20 touchdown pass season: Benny Friedman, 20 touchdown passes, New York Giants, 1929^{α}
- First 30 touchdown pass season: Johnny Unitas, 32 touchdown passes, Baltimore Colts, 1959
- First 40 touchdown pass season: Dan Marino, 48 touchdown passes, Miami Dolphins, 1984
- First 50 touchdown pass season: Tom Brady, 50 touchdown passes, New England Patriots, 2007
- First 55 touchdown pass season: Peyton Manning, 55 touchdown passes, Denver Broncos, 2013
- First 400 yard passing game: Sid Luckman, 433 passing yards, Chicago Bears vs. New York Giants; November 14, 1943
- First 500 yard passing game: Norm Van Brocklin, 554 passing yards, Los Angeles Rams vs. New York Yanks; September 28, 1951
- First 40 completion game: Richard Todd, 42 completions, New York Jets vs. San Francisco 49ers; September 21, 1980
- First 4 touchdown pass game: Benny Friedman
- First 5 touchdown pass game: Ray Buivid, Chicago Bears vs. Chicago Cardinals; December 5, 1937
- First 6 touchdown pass game: Sammy Baugh, Washington Redskins vs. Brooklyn Dodgers; October 31, 1943
- First 7 touchdown pass game: Sid Luckman, Chicago Bears vs. New York Giants; November 14, 1943
- First player with 100 career touchdown passes: Sammy Baugh
- First player with 200 career touchdown passes: Y. A. Tittle
- First player with 300 career touchdown passes: Fran Tarkenton
- First player with 400 career touchdown passes: Dan Marino
- First player with 500 career touchdown passes: Brett Favre
- First player with 600 career touchdown passes: Tom Brady.
- First player with 10,000 career passing yards: Sammy Baugh
- First player with 20,000 career passing yards: Sammy Baugh
- First player with 30,000 career passing yards: Johnny Unitas
- First player with 40,000 career passing yards: Johnny Unitas
- First player with 50,000 career passing yards: Dan Marino
- First player with 60,000 career passing yards: Dan Marino
- First player with 70,000 career passing yards: Brett Favre
- First player with 80,000 career passing yards: Drew Brees
- First player with 85,000 career passing yards: Tom Brady
- First player with 1,000 career pass completions: Bobby Layne
- First player with 2,000 career pass completions: Y. A. Tittle
- First player with 3,000 career pass completions: Fran Tarkenton
- First player with 4,000 career pass completions: Dan Marino
- First player with 5,000 career pass completions: Brett Favre
- First player with 6,000 career pass completions: Brett Favre
- First player with 7,000 career pass completions: Drew Brees
- First player with 1,000 career pass attempts: Arnie Herber
- First player with 2,000 career pass attempts: Sammy Baugh
- First player with 3,000 career pass attempts: Bobby Layne
- First player with 4,000 career pass attempts: Johnny Unitas
- First player with 5,000 career pass attempts: Johnny Unitas
- First player with 6,000 career pass attempts: Fran Tarkenton
- First player with 7,000 career pass attempts: Dan Marino
- First player with 8,000 career pass attempts: Dan Marino
- First player with 9,000 career pass attempts: Brett Favre
- First player with 10,000 career pass attempts: Brett Favre
- First player with 11,000 career pass attempts: Tom Brady
- First player with 12,000 career pass attempts: Tom Brady
- First player with 100 career passing interceptions: Sammy Baugh
- First player with 200 career passing interceptions: Sammy Baugh
- First player with 300 career passing interceptions: Brett Favre

=== Receiving ===
- First 50 reception season: Don Looney, 58 receptions, Philadelphia Eagles, 1940
- First 100 reception season: Lionel Taylor, 100 receptions, Denver Broncos (American Football League), 1961
- First 100 reception season by an NFL player: 106, Art Monk, 1984
- First 15 reception game: Tom Fears, 18 receptions, Los Angeles Rams vs. Green Bay Packers; December 3, 1950
- First 20 reception game: Terrell Owens, 20 receptions, San Francisco 49ers vs. Chicago Bears; December 17, 2000
- First 10 touchdown reception season: Johnny McNally, 11 touchdown receptions, Green Bay Packers, 1931^{α}
- First 15 touchdown reception season: Don Hutson, 17 touchdown receptions, Green Bay Packers, 1942
- First 20 touchdown reception season: Jerry Rice, 22 touchdown receptions, San Francisco, 1987
- First 1,000 yard receiving season: Don Hutson, 1,211 receiving yards, Green Bay Packers, 1942
- First 1,500 yard receiving season: Charley Hennigan, 1,746 receiving yards, Houston Oilers (American Football League), 1961
- First 200 yard receiving game: Don Hutson, 209 receiving yards, Green Bay Packers; October 18, 1942
- First 250 yard receiving game: Jim Benton, 303 receiving yards, Cleveland Browns vs. Detroit Lions; November 22, 1945
- First 300 yard receiving game: Jim Benton, 303 receiving yards, Cleveland Browns vs. Detroit Lions; November 22, 1945
- First 5 touchdown reception game: Bob Shaw, 5 touchdown receptions, Chicago Cardinals vs. Baltimore Colts; October 2, 1950

=== Scrimmage ===
- First 1,000 yards from scrimmage season: Beattie Feathers, 1,178 yards from scrimmage, Chicago Bears, 1934
- First 1,500 yards from scrimmage season: Chet Mutryn, 1,617 yards from scrimmage, Buffalo Bills (AAFC), 1948 (not recognized as an NFL record)
- First 2,000 yards from scrimmage season: Jim Brown, 2,131 yards from scrimmage yards, Cleveland Browns, 1963
- First 2,500 yards from scrimmage season: Chris Johnson, 2,509 from scrimmage yards, Tennessee Titans, 2009 – only 2,500 yard season
- First 300 yards from scrimmage game: Jim Benton, 303 yards from scrimmage (all receiving), Cleveland Browns vs. Detroit Lions; November 22, 1945

=== Combined yards ===
- First 1,000 combined yards season: Beattie Feathers, 1,178 combined yards, Chicago Bears, 1934
- First 1,500 combined yards season: Harry Clarke, 1,575 combined yards, Chicago Bears, 1943
- First 2,000 combined yards season: Spec Sanders, 2,202 combined yards, New York Yanks, 1960
- First 2,500 combined yards season: Lionel James, 2,535 combined yards, San Diego Chargers, 1985
- First 300 combined yards game: Jim Benton, 303 combined yards, Cleveland Browns vs. Detroit Lions; November 22, 1945
- First 350 combined yards game: Billy Cannon, 373 combined yards, Houston Oilers vs. New York Titans (American Football League); December 10, 1961
- First 400 combined yards game: Glyn Milburn, 404 combined yards, Denver Broncos vs. Seattle Seahawks; December 10, 1995 – only 400 combined yard game

=== Touchdowns ===
- First 15 touchdown season: Don Hutson, 17 touchdowns, Green Bay Packers, 1942
- First 20 touchdown season: Lenny Moore, 20 touchdowns, Baltimore Colts, 1964
- First 25 touchdown season: Emmitt Smith, 25 touchdowns, Dallas Cowboys, 1995
- First 30 touchdown season: LaDainian Tomlinson, 31 touchdowns, San Diego Chargers, 2006
- First 5 touchdown game: Jimmy Conzelman, 5 touchdowns, Rock Island vs. Evansville; October 15, 1922^{α}

=== Scoring ===
- First 100 point season: Don Hutson, 138 points, Green Bay Packers, 1942
- First 150 point season: Paul Hornung, 176 points, Green Bay Packers, 1960
- First 50 yard field goal, estimated: Paddy Driscoll, 50 to 55 yards, Chicago Cardinals vs. Milwaukee Badgers; September 28, 1924 (drop kick)^{α}
- First 50 yard field goal, confirmed: Glenn Presnell, 54 yards, Detroit Lions vs. Green Bay Packers; October 7, 1934
- First 55 yard field goal, confirmed: Bert Rechichar, 56 yards, Baltimore Colts vs. Chicago Bears; September 27, 1953
- First 60 yard field goal: Tom Dempsey, 63 yards, New Orleans Saints vs. Detroit Lions; November 8, 1970
- First 5 field goal game: Bob Waterfield, 5 field goals, Los Angeles Rams vs Detroit Lions; December 9, 1951

=== Starts ===
- First quarterback with 100 consecutive starts: Ron Jaworski November 27, 1983
- First quarterback with 200 consecutive starts: Brett Favre November 29, 2004

=== Wins ===
- First NFL quarterback to defeat 32 franchises: Brett Favre vs. Green Bay Packers; October 5, 2009
- First NFL quarterback to reach 100 career wins (regular season): Johnny Unitas vs. Green Bay Packers; November 9, 1969
- First NFL quarterback to reach 150 career wins (regular season): Brett Favre vs. San Diego Chargers; September 23, 2007
- First NFL quarterback to reach 200 career wins (regular season): Tom Brady vs. Kansas City Chiefs; October 14, 2018
- First NFL quarterback to reach 200 career wins (regular season and postseason combined): Peyton Manning vs. Carolina Panthers; February 7, 2016
- First NFL quarterback to reach 250 career wins (regular season and postseason combined): Tom Brady vs. Carolina Panthers; September 20, 2020
- First NFL quarterback to reach 250 career wins (regular season): Tom Brady vs. Arizona Cardinals; December 25, 2022

== Longest play ==
- Longest non-scoring play: 104 yards, Percy Harvin, Minnesota Vikings vs. Atlanta Falcons; November 27, 2011, and Ameer Abdullah, Detroit Lions vs. Green Bay Packers; November 15, 2015
- Longest run by a quarterback: 93 yards, Terrelle Pryor, Oakland Raiders vs. Pittsburgh Steelers; October 27, 2013
- Longest field goal return: 109 yards, Antonio Cromartie, San Diego Chargers vs. Minnesota Vikings; November 4, 2007, and Jamal Agnew, Jacksonville Jaguars vs. Arizona Cardinals; September 26, 2021
- Longest run from scrimmage: 99 yards, Tony Dorsett, Dallas Cowboys vs. Minnesota Vikings; January 3, 1983, and Derrick Henry, Tennessee Titans vs. Jacksonville Jaguars; December 6, 2018
- Longest pass: 99 yards, by 13 players, most recently Eli Manning, New York Giants vs. New York Jets; December 24, 2011 (Victor Cruz)
- Longest kickoff return: 109 yards, Cordarrelle Patterson, Minnesota Vikings vs. Green Bay Packers; October 27, 2013

== See also ==
- List of National Football League records (team)
- List of Super Bowl records
- List of gridiron football quarterbacks passing statistics
