= List of most consecutive starts by an NFL quarterback =

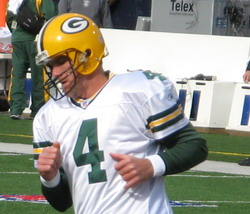
Brett Favre holds the record for most consecutive starts by a quarterback.

In the history of the National Football League (NFL), there have been twelve starts streaks of at least 100 consecutive games by eleven different quarterbacks, with four of those with a regular season streak of at least 200 games.

Brett Favre has held the record since November 7, 1999, when he made his 117th consecutive start against the Chicago Bears. His consecutive starts streak is also the longest all-time for a non-special teams player. On December 5, 2010, playing for the Minnesota Vikings against the Buffalo Bills, Favre was knocked out of the game on the first drive with a sprained SC joint injury to his right shoulder, caused by a hit from linebacker Arthur Moats. After a snowstorm delayed the following Sunday's game against the New York Giants to Monday, December 13, Favre was ruled inactive, ending his streak at a record 297 games (321 including playoffs).

Below is a list of the top 25 quarterbacks to achieve the longest consecutive regular season starts at their position.

== All-time consecutive starts streaks ==
Bold denotes an active streak.

Top 25 ranked by consecutive regular season starts, updated through the 2026 season
Rank	Quarterback	Streak start	Streak end	Teams	Regular season	Playoffs	Total	References
1	Brett Favre	September 27, 1992	December 5, 2010	GB/NYJ/MIN	297	24	321	
2	Philip Rivers	September 11, 2006	December 28, 2025	SD/LAC/IND	243	12	255	
3	Eli Manning	November 21, 2004	November 23, 2017	NYG	210	12	222	
4	Peyton Manning	September 6, 1998	January 8, 2011	IND	208	19	227	
5	Matt Ryan	December 20, 2009	October 20, 2019	ATL	154	9	163	
6	Russell Wilson	September 9, 2012	October 7, 2021	SEA	149	16	165	
**7**	**Josh Allen**	**November 25, 2018**	**Active**	**BUF**	**131**	**15**	**146**	
8	Matthew Stafford	September 11, 2011	November 3, 2019	DET	136	3	139	
9	Joe Flacco	September 7, 2008	November 22, 2015	BAL	122	15	137	
10	Ron Jaworski	September 18, 1977	November 25, 1984	PHI	116	7	123	
11	Tom Brady	September 14, 2009	January 3, 2016	NE	112	14	126	
12	Tom Brady	September 30, 2001	September 7, 2008	NE	111	17	128	
13	Tom Brady	October 9, 2016	January 16, 2023	NE/TB	110	16	126	
14	Joe Ferguson	September 18, 1977	September 23, 1984	BUF	107	3	110	
15	Dan Marino	October 25, 1987	October 10, 1993	MIA	95	4	99	
16	Derek Carr	October 15, 2017	December 24, 2022	OAK/LV	91	1	92	
17	Roman Gabriel	November 28, 1965	September 17, 1972	LAR	89	2	91	
18	Johnny Unitas	September 27, 1959	November 7, 1965	BAL	88	3	91	
19	Jim Everett	September 4, 1988	October 23, 1993	LAR	87	4	91	
20	Richard Todd	September 9, 1979	December 2, 1984	NYJ/NO	86	4	90	
21T	Aaron Brooks	November 26, 2000	December 12, 2005	NO	82	2	84	
21T	Drew Brees	January 16, 2010	September 20, 2015	NO	82	8	90	
23	Trent Green	September 9, 2001	September 10, 2006	KC	81	1	82	
24T	Drew Brees	January 8, 2005	December 27, 2009	SD/NO	79	3	82	
24T	Kirk Cousins	September 13, 2015	December 23, 2019	WAS/MIN	79	1	80	

== See also ==
- Iron man
- List of most consecutive starts and games played by NFL players
- List of NFL individual records#Starts
- List of current NFL starting quarterbacks
- List of most consecutive games with touchdown passes in the NFL
- List of NFL career quarterback wins leaders
