= 1990 All-South Independent football team =

American college football season

The 1990 All-South Independent football Team consists of American football players chosen by the Associated Press for their All-South independent teams for the 1990 NCAA Division I-A football season.

== Offense ==
=== Quarterback ===
- Craig Erickson, Miami (AP-1)
- Brett Favre, Southern Miss (AP-2)

=== Running backs ===
- Amp Lee, Florida State (AP-1)
- Michael Richardson, Louisiana Tech (AP-1)
- Edgar Bennett, Florida State (AP-2)
- Tony Smith, Southern Miss (AP-2)
- Chance Miller, Tulane (AP-2)

=== Wide receivers ===
- Lawrence Dawsey, Florida State (AP-1)
- Bobby Slaughter, Louisiana Tech (AP-1)
- Wesley Carroll, Miami (AP-1)
- Quent McCollum, Louisiana-Lafayette (AP-2)
- Melvin Ferdinand, Tulane (AP-2)

=== Tight ends ===
- Luke Fisher, East Carolina (AP-1)
- Reggie Johnson, Florida State (AP-2)

=== Offensive tackles ===
- Eugene Chung, Virginia Tech (AP-1)
- Mike Sullivan, Miami (AP-1)
- Darin Shoulders, Tulane (AP-2)
- Paul Norton, Louisiana-Lafayette (AP-2)
- Calvin Stephens, South Carolina (AP-2)

=== Offensive guards ===
- Mike Morris, Florida State (AP-1)
- Chafan Marsh, Southern Miss (AP-1)
- Hayward Haynes, Florida State (AP-2)
- Chad Martin, East Carolina (AP-2)
- Keith Bland, Memphis (AP-2)

=== Centers ===
- Darren Handy, Miami (AP-1)
- Trey Snodgrass, Louisiana Tech (AP-2)

== Defense ==
=== Defensive ends ===
- Corey Miller, South Carolina (AP-1)
- Mike Flores, Louisville (AP-1)
- George Koonce, East Carolina (AP-2)
- Jimmy Whitten, Virginia Tech (AP-2)

=== Defensive tackles ===
- Russell Maryland, Miami (AP-1)
- Ted Washington, Louisville (AP-2)
- Shane Curry, Miami (AP-2)

=== Inside linebackers ===
- Kirk Carruthers, Florida State (AP-2)

=== Linebackers ===
- Marvin Jones, Florida State (AP-1)
- Robert Jones, East Carolina (AP-1)
- Maurice Crum, Miami (AP-1)
- Mark Sander, Louisville (AP-1)
- Arnie Williams, Southern Miss (AP-2)
- Pat Stant, Tulane (AP-2)
- Archie Hopkins, Virginia Tech (AP-2)

=== Cornerbacks ===
- Terrell Buckley, Florida State (AP-1)
- Glenn Rogers, Memphis (AP-1)
- Kerry Valrie, Southern Miss (AP-1)
- Robert Bailey, Miami (AP-2)
- Ray Buchanan, Louisville (AP-2)

=== Safeties ===
- Damien Russell, Virginia Tech (AP-1)
- Bill Ragans, Florida State (AP-2)
- Van Ray Alexander, Louisiana-Lafayette (AP-2)

== Special teams ==
=== Kicker ===
- Collin Mackie, South Carolina (AP-1)
- Carlos Huerta, Miami (AP-2)

=== Punter ===
- Klaus Willsmeyer, Louisville (AP-1)
- Jeff Fite, Memphis (AP-2)
