= 1989 All-South Independent football team =

American college football season

The 1989 All-South Independent football team consists of American football players chosen by the Associated Press for their All-South independent teams for the 1989 NCAA Division I-A football season.

== Offense ==
=== Quarterback ===
- Peter Tom Willis, Florida State (AP-1)
- Browning Nagle, Louisville (AP-2)

=== Running backs ===
- Harold Green, South Carolina (AP-1)
- Derrick Douglas, Louisiana Tech (AP-1)
- Cardwell Gardner, Louisville (AP-2)
- Marvin Cox, Memphis (AP-2)
- Michael Pierce, Tulane (AP-2)

=== Wide receivers ===
- Wesley Carroll, Miami (AP-1)
- Lawrence Dawsey, Florida State (AP-1)
- Walter Wilson, East Carolina (AP-2)
- Dale Dawkins, Miami (AP-2)

=== Tight ends ===
- Chad Fortune, Louisville (AP-1)

=== Offensive tackles ===
- Paul Norton, Louisiana-Lafayette (AP-1)
- Skip Pavlik, Virginia Tech (AP-1)
- Chris Ryals, Southern Miss (AP-2)
- Ike Harris, South Carolina (AP-2)
- Darin Shoulders, Tulane (AP-2)

=== Offensive guards ===
- John Brown, Florida State (AP-1)
- Mike Sullivan, Miami (AP-1)
- Bobby García, Miami (AP-2)

=== Centers ===
- Michael Tanks, Florida State (AP-1)
- Allen Douglas, Louisville (AP-2)

== Defense ==
=== Defensive tackles ===
- Odell Haggins, Florida State (AP-1)
- Russell Maryland, Miami (AP-1)
- Scott Hill, Virginia Tech (AP-1)
- Cortez Kennedy, Miami (AP-1)
- Eric Hayes, Florida State (AP-2)

=== Defensive ends ===
- Greg Mark, Miami (AP-1)
- Anthony Thompson, East Carolina (AP-2)
- Corey Miller, South Carolina (AP-2)

=== Linebackers ===
- Mark Sander, Louisville (AP-1)
- Maurice Crum, Miami (AP-1)
- Glenell Sanders, Louisiana Tech (AP-1)
- Shelton Thompson, (AP-2)
- William Kirksey, Southern Miss (AP-2)
- Robert Jones, East Carolina (AP-2)
- Jock Jones, Virginia Tech (AP-2)
- Sean Lucas, Virginia Tech (AP-2)

=== Inside linebackers ===
- Kirk Carruthers, Florida State (AP-1)

=== Cornerbacks ===
- Junior Robinson, East Carolina (AP-1)
- Roland Smith, Miami (AP-1)
- Kerry Valrie, Southern Miss (AP-2)

=== Safeties ===
- Leroy Butler, Florida State (AP-1)
- Roger Brown, Virginia Tech (AP-2)
- Mitchell Price, Tulane (AP-2)
- Keith Annulis, Louisiana-Lafayette (AP-2)

== Special teams ==
=== Kicker ===
- Matt Stover, Louisiana Tech (AP-1)
- Carlos Huerta, Miami (AP-2)

=== Punter ===
- Daren Parker, South Carolina (AP-1)
- Scott Bryant, Southern Miss (AP-2)
