= 1988 All-South Independent football team =

American college football season

The 1988 All-South Independent football team consists of American football players chosen by the Associated Press for their All-South independent teams for the 1988 NCAA Division I-A football season.

== Offense ==
=== Quarterback ===
- Steve Walsh, Miami (AP-1)
- Chip Ferguson, Florida State (AP-2)

=== Running backs ===
- Cleveland Gary, Miami (AP-1)
- Deon Booker, Louisville (AP-1)
- Sammie Smith, Florida State (AP-2)
- Shelton Gandy, Southern Miss (AP-2)
- Michael Pierce, Tulane (AP-2)

=== Wide receivers ===
- Terry Anthony, Florida State (AP-1)
- Andre Brown, Miami (AP-1)
- Ronald Lewis, Florida State (AP-2)
- Charles Wilson, Memphis (AP-2)

=== Tight ends ===
- Rod Chudzinski, Miami (AP-1)
- Chad Fortune, Louisville (AP-2)

=== Offensive tackles ===
- Pat Tomberlin, Florida State (AP-1)
- John O’Neill, Miami (AP-1)
- Joey Ionata, Florida State (AP-2)
- Todd Grantham, Virginia Tech (AP-2)

=== Offensive guards ===
- Jason Kuipers, Florida State (AP-1)
- Reid Bennett, Memphis (AP-1)
- Mike Sullivan, Miami (AP-2)
- Keith Zimmerman, Louisiana-Lafayette (AP-2)

=== Centers ===
- Randy Harwell, South Carolina (AP-1)
- Allen Douglas, Louisville (AP-2)

== Defense ==
=== Defensive ends ===
- Chris Gannon, Louisiana-Lafayette (AP-1)
- Bill Hawkins, Miami (AP-1)
- Kevin Hendrix, South Carolina (AP-2)

=== Defensive tackles ===
- Odell Haggins, Florida State (AP-1)
- Horacio Moronta, Virginia Tech (AP-1)
- Steve Gabbard, Florida State (AP-2)
- Tory Epps, Memphis (AP-2)
- Russell Maryland, Miami (AP-2)

=== Linebackers ===
- Patrick Hinton, South Carolina (AP-1)
- Maurice Crum, Miami (AP-1)
- Mark Sander, Louisville (AP-1)
- Kelvin Smith, Florida State (AP-2)
- Anthony Thompson, East Carolina (AP-2)
- George Hill, Southern Miss (AP-2)
- Damon Young, Memphis (AP-2)

=== Defensive backs ===
- Deion Sanders, Florida State (AP-1)
- Bubba McDowell, Miami (AP-1)
- James Henry, Southern Miss (AP-2)
- Robert Robinson, South Carolina (AP-2)

=== Safeties ===
- Ron Rabune, South Carolina (AP-1)
- Eddie Moose, Memphis (AP-1)

== Special teams ==
=== Kicker ===
- Colin Mackie, South Carolina (AP-1)

=== Punter ===
- Rodney Price, South Carolina (AP-1)
- Billy Knighten, Southern Miss (AP-2)
