= NFL interceptions leaders =

NFL interceptions leaders may refer to:

- List of NFL annual interceptions leaders
- List of NFL career interceptions leaders
- List of NFL career interceptions thrown leaders
