= Chip Ferguson =

American football player (born 1967)

Profile
- Position: Quarterback

Personal information
- Born: March 16, 1967 (age 59); Charlotte, North Carolina, U.S.
- Listed height: 6 ft 1 in (1.85 m)
- Listed weight: 195 lb (88 kg)

Career information
- High school: Spartanburg (Spartanburg, South Carolina)
- College: Florida State (1985–1988)
- NFL draft: 1989: undrafted

Career history
- Tampa Bay Storm (1991)

Awards and highlights
- ArenaBowl champion (1991); Second-team All-South independent (1988)

Career AFL statistics
- Comp. / Att.: 27 / 50
- Passing yards: 364
- TD–INT: 7–3
- QB rating: 87.42
- Stats at ArenaFan.com

Charles "Chip" Ferguson (born March 16, 1967) is an American former professional football quarterback who played one season with the Tampa Bay Storm of the Arena Football League. He played college football at Florida State University.

== Early life ==
Charles Ferguson was born on March 16, 1967, in Charlotte, North Carolina. He attended Spartanburg High School in Spartanburg, South Carolina.

== College career ==
Ferguson was a four-year letterman for the Florida State Seminoles of Florida State University from 1985 to 1988. He completed 70 of 130 passes (53.8%) for 990 yards, 11 touchdowns, and eight interceptions as a freshman in 1985 while also scoring two rushing touchdowns. In 1986, he recorded 63 completions on 128 passing attempts (49.2%) for 807 yards, four touchdowns, and seven interceptions. Ferguson totaled 26 of 44 passes (59.1%) for 335 yards, three touchdowns, and two interceptions, and one rushing touchdown in 1987. As a senior in 1988, he completed 122 of 194 passes (62.9%) for 1,714 yards, 16 touchdowns, and 11 interceptions. His completion percentage was the highest among independents that year. He earned second-team All-South independent honors for the 1988 season.

== Professional career ==
Ferguson played in ten games for the Tampa Bay Storm of the Arena Football League in 1991, completing 27 of 50 passes (54.0%) for 364 yards, seven touchdowns, and three interceptions. The Storm finished the season with an 8–2 record and won ArenaBowl V against the Detroit Drive.
