= Mike North =

American radio sports personality

Mike North (born September 10th, 1952) is an American radio sports personality, formerly working for Clear Channel Communications as a cohost with Andy Furman on Fox Sports Daybreak Mon-Friday from 5am-8am CST on their Fox Sports Radio subsidiary, until this program was cancelled in September 2016. North writes a column, The Rebel Inside, twice a week for the Daily Herald and does videos three days a week for their web site about current sports topics. He was the co-host of the Monsters in the Morning with Dan Jiggetts on Comcast SportsNet Chicago in 2009 and was a sports talk radio show host at WSCR "The Score 670" in Chicago from 1992 to 2008 along with Doug Buffone. He was also the color man for the Chicago Rush AFL team for two seasons alongside Tom Dore. He was the co-host of Monsters and Money in the Morning on WBBM-TV CBS 2 Chicago until its cancellation in 2010.

== History ==
North was raised in Chicago's Edgewater, Chicago neighborhood and attended Senn High School from 1967–1970 before dropping out to work for the Chicago Park District. In 1971 he was drafted to join the US Army, completing basic training at Ft. Polk, Louisiana.

In the late 1970s, North and his wife, BeBe, bought their first hot dog stand. They established Be-Be's Hot Dogs in 1984. Among North's frequent customers at his restaurant was the staff of Diamond Broadcasting, owners of WXRT-FM and WSBC-AM. After North suggested to them that he take the place for vacationing Chicago Tribune columnist Bob Verdi as the host of a short sports segment on WXRT, North's contacts at Diamond suggested he lease time on WSBC if he was interested in pursuing a career in radio. North took their advice and launched the "NFL Handicap Show" on WSBC in 1990.

After the Diamond Broadcasting team purchased WSCR in 1992, North was hired to become one of the station's original personalities, teaming with Dan Jiggetts on the Monsters of the Midday show (a twist on the popular Chicago term, Monsters of the Midway),. The two were reunited for a one-year stint on cable television in 2009.

== Radio timeline ==
- 1990 – "NFL Handicap Show" on WSBC
- 1992 – WSCR was launched. North teamed with former Chicago Bear, Dan Jiggetts on The Monsters of the Midday show.
- September 1999 – North began hosting his own show, The Mike North Show, from 12-4pm Monday through Friday.
- 2002 – North teamed up with former Chicago Bear Doug Buffone, and they soon became known as "The Wise Guys".
- August 2002 – North signed a multi-year contract worth an estimated $1.5 million a year, making him one of the highest paid radio personalities in Chicago.
- September 2004 – North agreed to host The Score's morning show to compete with rival WMVP's syndicated ESPN Radio morning show, Mike and Mike in the Morning. Until this move, North's shows had generally been broadcast during mid-day or afternoon time slots.
- Spring 2006 – North called his own station while driving drunk.
- June 2008 – Left WSCR when his contract with the station ended

== Controversies ==
Calling Chicago Cubs Korean pitcher Jae Kuk Ryu a "Chinaman."

Opining that Hispanic-American newscaster Antonio Mora could get better ratings if he wore a sombrero during his newscasts.

On May 18, 2007, North engaged in a much-publicized argument with then White Sox manager Ozzie Guillén during his show, in which Guillen frequently cursed at North before hanging up on him.

On June 20, 2007, North was targeted by fans of the Opie & Anthony show. The radio duo took issue with North seemingly taking credit for being one of the first radio hosts to use the chat service Paltalk, something they instead laid claim to. Fans subsequently invaded North's chat room and bombarded him with insults while Opie & Anthony watched from their own chat room and mocked North and his show.

On November 10, 2020, North implied that Tony La Russa receiving a DUI was a "good omen" for the Chicago White Sox because in 1985 Chicago Bears head coach Mike Ditka was convicted of a DUI shortly after their victory over the former Super Bowl winning San Francisco 49ers, and later that year on went to win the Super Bowl in the 1985 NFL season.

== Outside of WSCR ==
North has released a CD, Caucasian Man, with music and interview highlights. This CD includes a parody song titled "Secret Asian Man."

North had an acting role in the movie Eden Court. In spite of being complete for a year, the film has only been screened at obscure festivals and has not secured commercial distribution.

North has appeared on WBBM-TV, WMAQ-TV and WFLD-TV

North appeared in the slot formerly filled by Imus in the Morning on WFAN May 29 and 30, 2007.

In August 2008, North launched a short-lived, subscription-based sports gambling website, and had a podcast hosted on the website of a Chicago-based restaurant chain.

In April 2009, North was hired by David Hernandez, to work at a webcasting company focused on Chicago sports.

According to a criminal complaint filed by the U.S. Securities and Exchange Commission, Hernandez was using the business he founded with North to launder money from Hernandez's fraudulent medical staffing firm NextStep Medical. The complaint alleges that North and Hernandez's business operated under the name of Spectrum Entertainment Group, which received over $160,000 of fraudulently-procured funds. Another shell company established by Hernandez using fraudulently-procured funds, The Ilumina Group, also financed the webcast operation.

While North was an executive for Spectrum Entertainment, $300,000 was funneled from Hernandez's company to fund the sports operation.

On June 12, 2009, Hernandez fired North after North questioned business irregularities. The following day it was reported that Hernandez was under federal investigation, and Hernandez was subsequently charged by the Securities and Exchange Commission with operating a Ponzi scheme.

In July 2009, North was sued in federal court by defrauded investors for his role in Hernandez's scheme but was cleared and released of any wrongdoing.

In December 2009, Comcast SportsNet decided not to renew North's television show because the budget costs were too high to sustain, effective 31 December 2009.
