= Doug Buffone =

American football player (1944–2015)

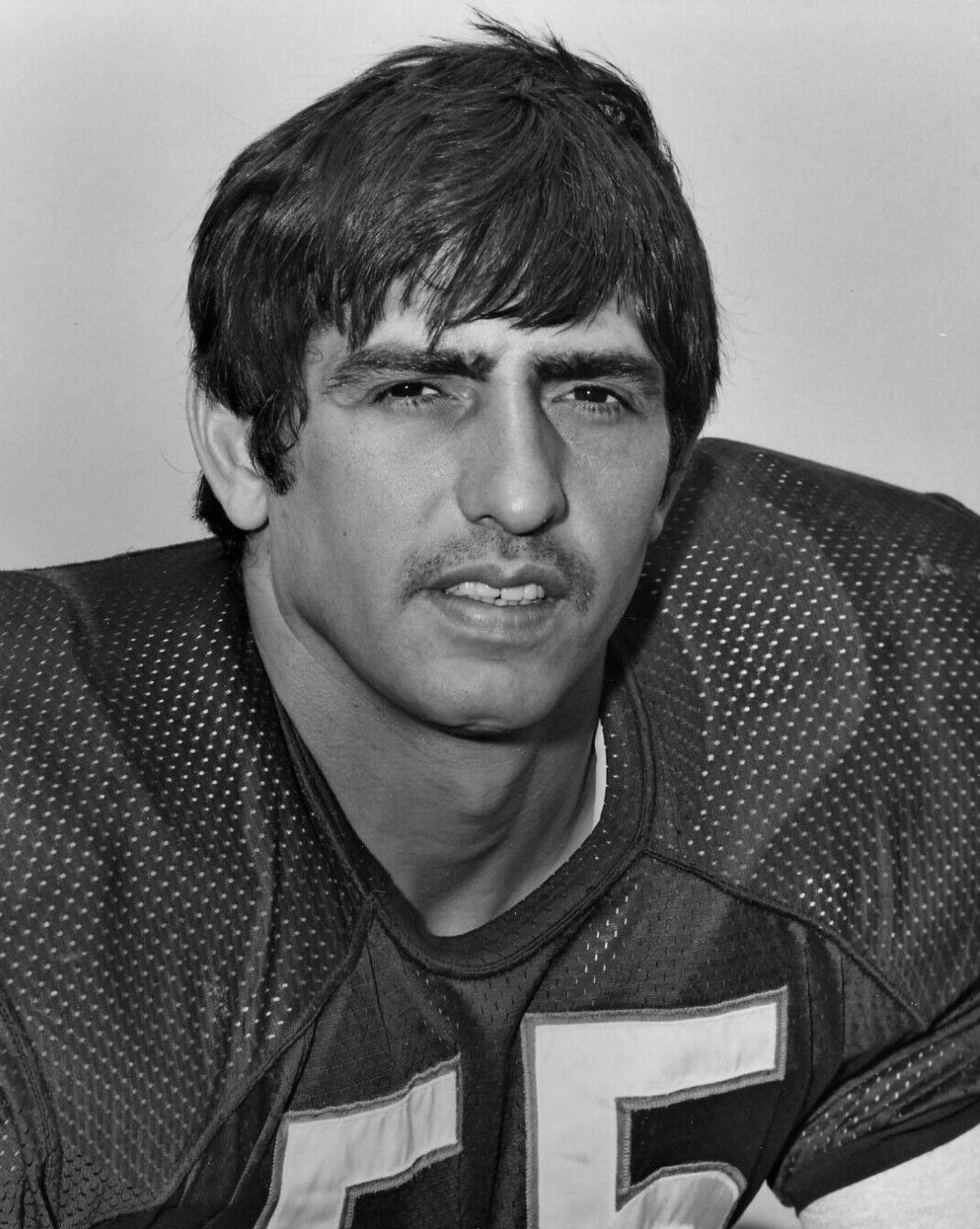

No. 55
- Position: Linebacker

Personal information
- Born: June 27, 1944; Yatesboro, Pennsylvania, U.S.
- Died: April 20, 2015 (aged 70); Chicago, Illinois, U.S.
- Listed height: 6 ft 3 in (1.91 m)
- Listed weight: 230 lb (104 kg)

Career information
- High school: Shannock Valley (Rural Valley, Pennsylvania)
- College: Louisville
- NFL draft: 1966: 4th round, 60th overall pick
- AFL draft: 1966: 9th round, 72nd overall pick

Career history
- Chicago Bears (1966–1979)

Awards and highlights
- 100 greatest Bears of All-Time; Second-team All-American (1965); Louisville Cardinals Ring of Honor; Inducted into KY Pro Football HOF (2015)

Career NFL statistics
- Fumble recoveries: 9
- Interceptions: 24
- Touchdowns: 1
- Stats at Pro Football Reference

Douglas John Buffone (Pronounced "Buff-OWN") (June 27, 1944 – April 20, 2015) was an American professional football player who was a linebacker for the Chicago Bears in the National Football League (NFL). Buffone, the son of a coal miner (whose parents were Italian immigrants from the southern province of Cosenza, regione di Calabria), attended high school at Shannock Valley High School in Rural Valley, Pennsylvania.

== College career ==
Born in Yatesboro, Pennsylvania, Buffone played linebacker and center from 1962 to 1965 at the University of Louisville. Buffone is one of only four players to lead UofL in tackles for three consecutive seasons. The others are Mark Sander, Tom Jackson (1970–72) and Tyrus McCloud (1994–96). He remains the Cardinals' No. 3 all-time tackler with 479, just nine stops behind the program's all-time leader Mark Sander (1987–90). Veteran head coach Frank Camp, who tutored NFL greats like Johnny Unitas, Lenny Lyles, Ernie Green and Ken Kortas, said Buffone was "the most complete ball player I've ever coached."

== NFL career ==
Following his collegiate career, Buffone was selected by the Chicago Bears in the fourth round of the 1966 NFL draft and the eighth round of the American Football League draft by the San Diego Chargers. Buffone went on to play 15 seasons at linebacker for the Bears, retiring in 1980 as the all-time leader in games played for the legendary organization.

In his professional career, Buffone gathered more than 1,200 tackles, going over the 100-tackle mark in seven seasons. He also had the honor of serving as defensive captain for eight seasons, beginning in 1972. Buffone retired with 24 career interceptions to lead all Bear linebackers. The first two pickoffs of his career came off future Hall of Famers Bart Starr and Johnny Unitas. His retirement from football also signaled the end of an era for the Bears as he was the last active Bear to have played for George Halas.

== Post-football career ==
Buffone and his family resided in Chicago, and he was heavily involved in Chicago sports and broadcasting. Doug was one of the founders of the Arena Football League, starting the Chicago Bruisers franchise, which played in ArenaBowl II. He appeared on some Bruisers radio and TV broadcasts with Les Grobstein, and was involved in the United States Football League with the Chicago Blitz. He provided broadcast color commentary for the first NFL game (featuring the Bears and the Dallas Cowboys) in Europe.

Buffone co-hosted "Chicago NFL Live" on "The Score" WSCR 670 AM, and the Bears' postgame show with Ed O'Bradovich, as well as 14 seasons of The Doug Buffone Show on Fox Sports Net Chicago. Buffone was the star of a popular segment of the Mully and Hanley show on WCSR on Fridays during the football season. He played the part of the humorous character "Big Doug", a bookie and collector. Other shows with which Buffone include The Neal Anderson Show for WBBM-AM, and The Mike Ditka Show for WSCR-AM. On "The Score", Buffone also co-hosted shows with Mike North (The Wise Guys) and Norm Van Lier (The Bear and The Bull), in addition to other hosts.

In May 2009, Buffone and his longtime Bears post-game partner Ed O'Bradovich left WSCR-AM and joined Chicago Sports Webio. However, in June 2009, the founder of Chicago Sports Webio was charged with operating a Ponzi scheme, and the site was shut down. Buffone and O'Bradovich re-signed with the Score in late August 2009.

Buffone was an entrepreneur, and part owner of several Chicago-area businesses, including "Gibson's Steak House", one of the most popular nightspots in Chicago's Rush Street area, and Digital One, a video production and streaming video company in the Chicago suburbs. Digital One is the creator of ClickStreamTV, an online video platform product that was designed for small to medium-sized businesses. Also, Buffone had a blog on his website where he posted his opinions on sports.

Buffone began broadcasting Chicago Rush Arena Football League games for Comcast SportsNet and WGN in 2010.

Buffone was inducted into the Kentucky Pro Football Hall of Fame in 2015.

== Death ==
Buffone died at his residence in Chicago, Illinois, on April 20, 2015, aged 70.

== Records and accomplishments ==
- Played 186 games as a Bear, the third most among Bears.
- Had a career-high 158 tackles in 1972
- Had 11 solo tackles vs. New Orleans (10/6/74)
- Holds the Bears record for most career interceptions at linebacker (24)
- Was voted into the Louisville Hall of Fame with Johnny Unitas in 1979
- National Italian American Sports hall of fame member since 1992
