= Damien Russell =

American football player (born 1970)

No. 38
- Position: Defensive back

Personal information
- Born: August 20, 1970 (age 56); New York, New York, U.S.
- Listed height: 6 ft 1 in (1.85 m)
- Listed weight: 204 lb (93 kg)

Career information
- High school: H.D. Woodson (Washington, D.C.)
- College: Virginia Tech (1988–1991)
- NFL draft: 1992: 6th round, 151st overall pick

Career history
- San Francisco 49ers (1992–1993)

Awards and highlights
- First-team All-South Independent (1990)

Career NFL statistics
- Fumble recoveries: 1
- Stats at Pro Football Reference

Damien Eduardo Russell (born August 20, 1970) is an American former professional football player who was a defensive back for one season with the San Francisco 49ers of the National Football League (NFL). He was selected by the 49ers in the sixth round of the 1992 NFL draft after playing college football for the Virginia Tech Hokies.

== Early life and college ==
Damien Eduardo Russell was born on August 20, 1970, in New York, New York. He attended Howard D. Woodson High School in Washington, D.C.

He was a four-year letterman for the Hokies of Virginia Tech from 1988 to 1991. He was named first-team All-South Independent by the Associated Press in 1990.

== Professional career ==
Russell was selected by the San Francisco 49ers in the sixth round, with the 151st overall pick, of the 1992 NFL draft. He officially signed with the team on August 27. He was then placed on the non-football injury list with a hamstring pull. He did not play in any games during the 1992 season. Russell appeared in all 16 games for the 49ers in 1993 and recovered one fumble. He also played in two playoff games that year. He was released by the 49ers on July 28, 1994.
