= Daren Parker =

American football player (born 1968)

No. 1
- Position: Punter

Personal information
- Born: April 10, 1968 (age 58); Concord, North Carolina, U.S.
- Listed height: 6 ft 0 in (1.83 m)
- Listed weight: 185 lb (84 kg)

Career information
- High school: Mount Pleasant (Mount Pleasant, North Carolina)
- College: South Carolina (1987–1991)
- NFL draft: 1992: undrafted

Career history
- Denver Broncos (1992)

Awards and highlights
- First-team All-South Independent (1989)
- Stats at Pro Football Reference

Roger Daren Parker (born April 10, 1968) is an American former professional football punter who played for the Denver Broncos of the National Football League (NFL). He played college football for the South Carolina Gamecocks.

== Early life ==
Roger Daren Parker was born on April 10, 1968, in Concord, North Carolina. He attended Mount Pleasant High School in Mount Pleasant, North Carolina.

== College career ==
Parker enrolled at the University of South Carolina to play college football for the Gamecocks. He was a letterman in 1987, 1989, 1990, and 1991. He punted seven times for 203 yards as a freshman in 1987. On September 17, 1988, against East Carolina, Parker entered the game after starting punter Rodney Price was benched. Parker punted four times for 156 yards but did not play in another game all season. He did not earn a letter in 1988. Parker was then the primary punter for South Carolina from 1989 to 1991. He earned Associated Press first-team All-South Independent honors in 1989. He finished his college career with 171 punts for 6,842 yards (a 40.0 yard average).

== Professional career ==
Parker went undrafted in the 1992 NFL draft. He later signed with the Denver Broncos on July 6, 1992. He had a 42.5-yard average during the preseason but was released on August 24 after the fourth of five preseason games. After punter Ruben Rodriguez was waived for punting to the wrong side of the field twice in one game, the Broncos re-signed Parker on December 2 to replace Rodriguez. Parker played in the next three games for the Broncos, punting 12 times for 491 yards and a 40.9 yard average. However, his net yards-per-punt was only 31.9. He was released on December 26, 1992, one day before the regular season finale and his spot on the roster was taken by rookie linebacker John Sullins. Broncos kickoff specialist Brad Daluiso handled the punting duties while starting quarterback John Elway was listed as the backup punter. The Pueblo Chieftain stated that the Broncos decided "they needed depth at linebacker instead of an erratic punter".
