= List of NFL career interceptions thrown leaders =

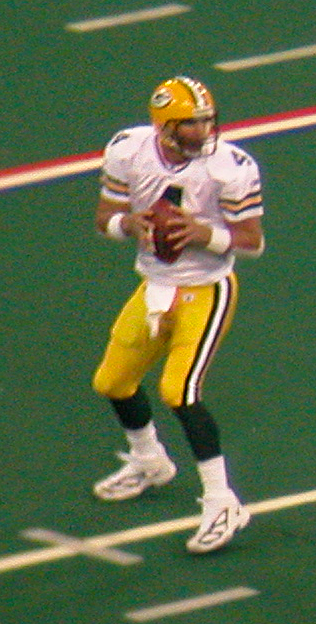
Brett Favre has thrown the most interceptions of any NFL player.

The following list shows the NFL players who have thrown the most career interceptions: Brett Favre holds the record for career interceptions thrown in the regular season with 336, while Tom Brady holds the record for career interceptions thrown in the playoffs with 40. Current stats are updated from Pro Football Reference (PFR) all-time interceptions thrown leaders.

== Regular season career interceptions thrown leaders ==
Key
^ Inducted into the Pro Football Hall of Fame
* Active player -->

Based on 200 Career Interceptions

No.	Name	Total	Int%
1	Brett Favre ^	336	3.3%
2	George Blanda ^	277	6.9%
3	John Hadl	268	5.7%
4	Vinny Testaverde	267	4.0%
5	Fran Tarkenton ^	266	4.1%
6	Norm Snead	257	5.9%
7	Johnny Unitas ^	253	4.9%
8	Dan Marino ^	252	3.0%
9	Peyton Manning ^	251	2.7%
10	Y. A. Tittle ^ ^{a}	248	5.8%
11	Jim Hart	247	4.9%
12	Eli Manning	244	4.5%
13	Drew Brees ^	243	2.3%
13	Bobby Layne ^	243	6.6%
15	Dan Fouts ^	242	4.3%
16	Warren Moon ^	233	3.4%
17	John Elway ^	226	3.1%
18	John Brodie	224	5.0%
19	Ken Stabler ^	222	5.9%
20	Joe Namath ^	220	5.8%
20	Babe Parilli	220	6.6%
22	Tom Brady	212	1.8%
22	Philip Rivers	212	2.6%
23	Ben Roethlisberger	211	2.5%
25	Terry Bradshaw ^	210	5.4%
26	Joe Ferguson	209	4.6%
27	Steve Grogan	208	5.8%
28	Drew Bledsoe	206	3.1%
29	Matthew Stafford *	206	2.3%
30	Steve Deberg	204	4.1%
31	Sammy Baugh ^	203	6.8%

Note

- ^a Y. A. Tittle also threw 27 interceptions while playing for the defunct Baltimore Colts Franchise of the All-America Football Conference in 1948 & 1949, but those stats were not included until 2025.

== Playoff leaders ==
Key
^ Inducted into the Pro Football Hall of Fame
* Active player -->

Statistics accurate as of the end of 2025–26 NFL playoffs

Based on 15 Career Interceptions

No.	Name	Total	Int%
1	Tom Brady	40	2.1%
2	Brett Favre ^	30	3.8%
3	Jim Kelly ^	28	5.1%
3	Ben Roethlisberger	28	3.6%
5	Terry Bradshaw ^	26	6.6%
6	Peyton Manning ^	25	2.4%
7	Dan Marino ^	24	3.5%
8	John Elway ^	21	3.2%
8	Joe Montana	21	2.9%
10	Roger Staubach ^	19	4.6%
11	Otto Graham ^	17	5.7%
11	Fran Tarkenton ^	17	5.8%
11	Donovan McNabb	17	2.9%
11	George Blanda ^	17	9.0%
11	Troy Aikman ^	17	3.4%
16	Dan Fouts ^	16	5.6%
16	Craig Morton	16	7.0%
16	Danny White	16	4.4%
19	Drew Brees ^	15	2.1%
