= Maurice Crum Sr. =

American football player (born 1969)

No. 53, 99
- Position: Linebacker

Personal information
- Born: April 19, 1969 (age 57); Tampa, Florida, U.S.
- Listed height: 6 ft 0 in (1.83 m)
- Listed weight: 230 lb (104 kg)

Career information
- High school: Hillsborough (Tampa)
- College: Miami (FL) (1987–1990)
- NFL draft: 1991: undrafted

Career history
- Tampa Bay Buccaneers (1991)*; Dallas Cowboys (1992)*; → Orlando Thunder (1992); Saskatchewan Roughriders (1993); Orlando Predators (1995)
- * Offseason or practice squad member only

Awards and highlights
- 2× National champion (1987, 1989); Consensus All-American (1990); 2× First-team All-South Independent (1988–1989)
- Stats at ArenaFan.com

Maurice Crum Sr. (born April 19, 1969) is an American former football linebacker. He played college football at the University of Miami, where he was a consensus All-American in 1990. Professionally, he was a member of the Tampa Bay Buccaneers and Dallas Cowboys of the National Football League (NFL), the Orlando Thunder of the World League of American Football (WLAF), the Saskatchewan Roughriders of the Canadian Football League (CFL), and the Orlando Predators of the Arena Football League (AFL).

== Early life ==
Maurice Crum was born on April 19, 1969, in Tampa, Florida. He appeared in the Little League World Series in both 1980 and 1981. He played high school football at Hillsborough High School in Tampa and earned all-state honors. He was a three-year starter, leading the team in tackles all three years. He scored 12 defensive touchdowns in high school (six interceptions, four blocked punts, and two fumble returns).

== College career ==
Crum was a four-year letterman for the Miami Hurricanes of the University of Miami from 1987 to 1990, helping Miami win the national championship in 1987 and 1989. He led the team in tackles for three straight years from 1988 to 1990. He was a consensus All-American in 1990. Crum had four career interceptions for 73 yards and two touchdowns. He also played baseball in college. He was inducted into the University of Miami Sports Hall of Fame in 2007.

== Professional career ==
Crum signed with the Tampa Bay Buccaneers after going undrafted in the 1991 NFL draft. He was also selected by the Milwaukee Brewers in the 39th round, with the 1,014th overall pick, of the 1991 Major League Baseball draft. He was later released by the Buccaneers and signed to the team's practice squad.

Crum was signed by the Dallas Cowboys in 1992 and allocated to the World League of American Football to play for the Orlando Thunder. He was later released by the Cowboys in 1992.

Crum dressed in all 18 games for the Saskatchewan Roughriders of the Canadian Football League in 1993, recording 80 defensive tackles, seven special teams tackles, one sack, one interception, and one fumble recovery that he returned 65 yards.

Crum played in seven games for the Orlando Predators of the Arena Football League (AFL) in 1995, totaling 21 solo tackles, three assisted tackles, one sack, one fumble recovery, two pass breakups, one blocked kick, and one interception that he returned one yard for a touchdown. He also rushed three times for nine yards. Crum was a fullback/linebacker during his time in the AFL as the league played under ironman rules.

== Personal life ==
Crum's son, Maurice Crum Jr., played football at Notre Dame.
