= Darin Shoulders =

American football player (born 1968)

No. 64
- Position: Offensive tackle

Personal information
- Born: May 23, 1968 (age 58); Jackson, Mississippi, U.S.
- Listed height: 6 ft 3 in (1.91 m)
- Listed weight: 288 lb (131 kg)

Career information
- High school: Forest Hill (Jackson)
- College: Tulane (1986–1990)
- NFL draft: 1991: undrafted

Career history
- Indianapolis Colts (1991)
- Stats at Pro Football Reference

Darin S. Shoulders (born May 23, 1968) is an American former professional football offensive tackle who played for the Indianapolis Colts of the National Football League (NFL). He played college football for the Tulane Green Wave.

== Early life ==
Darin S. Shoulders was born on May 23, 1968, in Jackson, Mississippi. He played high school football at Forest Hill High School in Jackson, earning All-Big Eight Mississippi honors at both offensive tackle and defensive end. He was named All-District on offense.

== College career ==
Shoulders enrolled at Tulane University to play college football for the Green Wave. He redshirted the 1986 season as a defensive tackle. Prior to the 1987 season opener, he was moved to offensive tackle/guard to provide depth on Tulane's offensive line. Shoulders played in ten games, starting six, overall in 1987. He was a four-year letterman from 1987 to 1990. He garnered Associated Press second-team All-South Independent recognition in both 1989 and 1990.

== Professional career ==
After going undrafted in the 1991 NFL draft, Shoulders signed with the Indianapolis Colts on April 29, 1991. He was released on August 26, re-signed on October 3, released again on October 16, and signed to the practice squad on October 21. Shoulders was promoted to the active roster on December 13 and played in one game for the Colts during the 1991 season. He became a free agent after the season and re-signed with Indianapolis. He was released on August 19, 1992.
