= Mark Sander =

American football player (born 1968)

No. 58
- Position: Linebacker

Personal information
- Born: March 21, 1968 (age 58); Louisville, Kentucky, U.S.
- Listed height: 6 ft 2 in (1.88 m)
- Listed weight: 232 lb (105 kg)

Career information
- High school: DeSales (Louisville)
- College: Louisville (1986–1990)
- NFL draft: 1991: undrafted

Career history
- Miami Dolphins (1991–1992); Scottish Claymores (1995); San Francisco 49ers (1996), (1997)*
- * Offseason or practice squad member only

Awards and highlights
- Third-team All-American (1990)
- Stats at Pro Football Reference

Mark Leonard Sander (born March 21, 1968) is an American former professional football player who was a linebacker or the Miami Dolphins of the National Football League (NFL) in 1992. He played college football for the Louisville Cardinals and holds the program record for career tackles. He played 12 games for the Dolphins, including two starts.

== College career ==
Sander originally walked on to the Louisville Cardinals football team. After redshirting in 1986, Sander became a four-year starter for the Cardinals. He was a 1988, 1989 First Team All-South Independent. On the morning of November 23, 1990, Sander was stabbed in the abdomen while attempting to break up a fight outside of a Louisville bar. He had previously worked as a bouncer at the bar and noticed some friends involved in an altercation shortly after arriving. Sander had to undergo four hours of surgery, which required 23 staples, and lost 10 pounds during his stay in the hospital. In his first interview following the incident on December 3, he claimed that he would be ready to return in time for their Fiesta Bowl matchup against Alabama. Sander started in the 34–7 win and passed Doug Buffone to become the school's career tackles leader with 492.

Sander graduated with a degree in political science.

== Professional career ==
After going undrafted in the 1991 NFL draft due to his size and perceived lack of speed, Sander was signed as a free agent by the Miami Dolphins. He spent the 1991 season on the practice squad. In 1992, Sander filled in for an injured John Offerdahl at the starting inside linebacker position. In his first game of meaningful action, he recorded nine tackles against the New York Jets. Two weeks later, in just his second start, Sander recorded a game-high nine tackles in a Monday Night Football loss to the Buffalo Bills, staying in the game after breaking his right hand in the second quarter. It was later discovered that he suffered a broken wrist as well. Sander was placed on the injured reserve list on December 2, 1992. He was subsequently placed on the physically unable to perform list in August 1993. He was then cut in November.
