= Mid-American Conference football individual awards =

Annual college football awards

The Mid-American Conference football awards are given annually by the Mid-American Conference (MAC) at the conclusion of each college football season. The conference gives out a total of five awards, the Offensive, Defensive, and Freshman Players of the Year, the Coach of the Year, and the Vern Smith Leadership Award, which is given to the league's MVP in that season. The Vern Smith Award is selected by a vote of the coaches in the MAC while the remaining awards are selected by the MAC News Media Association.

== Offensive Player of the Year ==
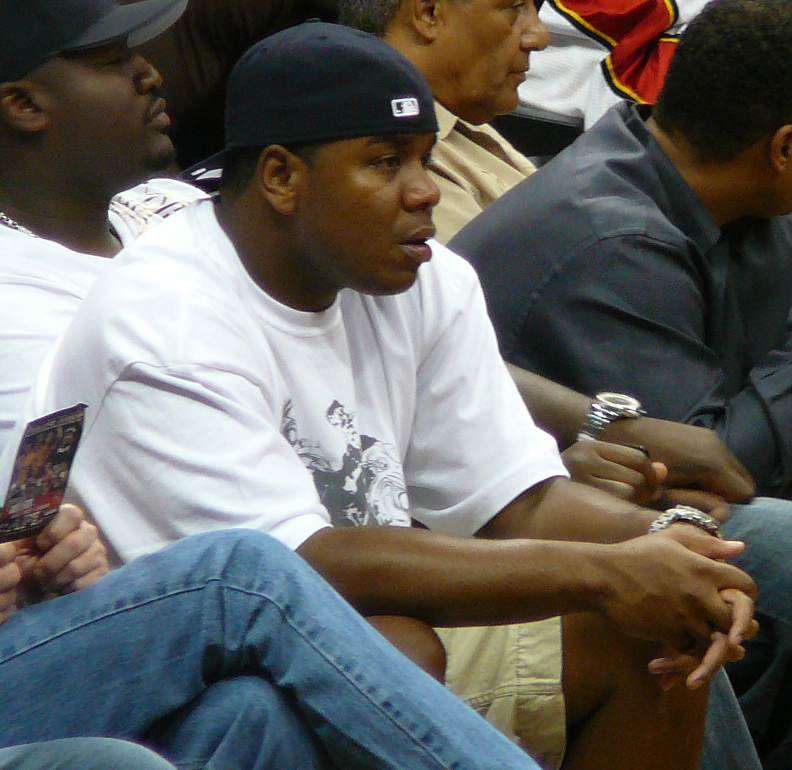
Byron Leftwich is one of the few multiple award winners. He earned a Super Bowl ring with the Pittsburgh Steelers in 2009.

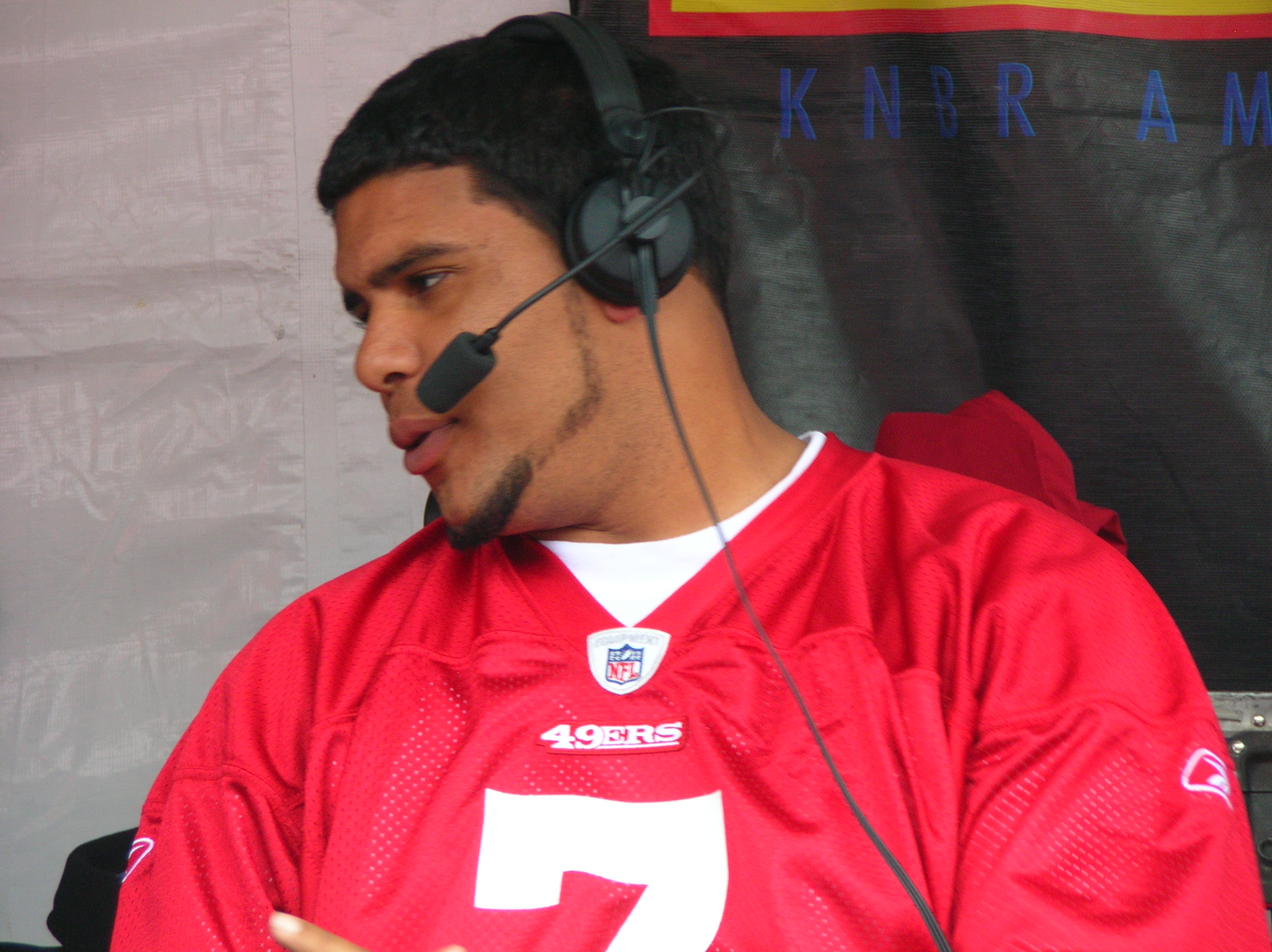
Nate Davis led the Ball State Cardinals to an undefeated regular season in 2008, earning him the award in that year.

=== Winners ===
Season	Player	Pos	Team	Ref
1965	Willie Asbury	RB	Kent State	
1966	Bruce Matte	QB	Miami (OH)	
1967	John Schneider	QB	Toledo	
1968	Cleve Bryant	QB	Ohio	
1969	Chuck Ealey	QB	Toledo	
1970	Chuck Ealey (2)	QB	Toledo	
1971	Chuck Ealey (3)	QB	Toledo	
1972	Bob Hitchens	RB	Miami (OH)	
1973	Paul Miles	RB	Bowling Green	
1974	Gene Swick	QB	Toledo	
1975	Gene Swick (2)	QB	Toledo	
1976	Jerome Persell	RB	Western Michigan	
1977	Jerome Persell (2)	RB	Western Michigan	
1978	Jerome Persell (3)	RB	Western Michigan	
1978	Dave Petzke	WR	Northern Illinois	
1979	Gary Hogeboom	QB	Central Michigan	
1980	Mark O'Connell	QB	Ball State	
1981	Sam Shon	QB	Ohio	
1982	Curtis Adams	RB	Central Michigan	
1983	Brian McClure	QB	Bowling Green	
1984	Brian McClure (2)	QB	Bowling Green	
1985	Brian McClure (3)	QB	Bowling Green	
1986	Terry Morris	QB	Miami (OH)	
1987	Eric Wilkerson	RB	Kent State	
1988	Tony Kimbrough	QB	Western Michigan	
1989	David Riley	QB	Ball State	
1990	Jeff Bender	QB	Central Michigan	
1991	Erik White	QB	Bowling Green	
1992	Erik White (2)	QB	Bowling Green	
1993	Mike Neu	QB	Ball State	
1994	Brian Pruitt	RB	Central Michigan	
1995	Wasean Tait	RB	Toledo	
1996	Kareem Wilson	QB	Ohio	
1997	Randy Moss	WR	Marshall	
1998	Travis Prentice	RB	Miami (OH)	
1999	Chad Pennington	QB	Marshall	
2000	Robert Sanford	RB	Western Michigan	
2001	Byron Leftwich	QB	Marshall	
2002	Byron Leftwich (2)	QB	Marshall	
2003	Ben Roethlisberger	QB	Miami (OH)	
2004	Omar Jacobs	QB	Bowling Green	
2005	Greg Jennings	WR	Western Michigan	
2006	Garrett Wolfe	RB	Northern Illinois	
2007	Dan LeFevour	QB	Central Michigan	
2008	Nate Davis	QB	Ball State	
2009	Dan LeFevour (2)	QB	Central Michigan	
2010	Chad Spann	RB	Northern Illinois	
2011	Chandler Harnish	QB	Northern Illinois	
2012	Jordan Lynch	QB	Northern Illinois	
2013	Jordan Lynch (2)	QB	Northern Illinois	
2014	Jarvion Franklin	RB	Western Michigan	
2015	Matt Johnson	QB	Bowling Green	
2016	Corey Davis	WR	Western Michigan	
2017	Logan Woodside	QB	Toledo	
2018	Tyree Jackson	QB	Buffalo	
2019	LeVante Bellamy	RB	Western Michigan	
2020	Jaret Patterson	RB	Buffalo	
2021	Lew Nichols III	RB	Central Michigan	
2022	Kurtis Rourke	QB	Ohio	
2023	Peny Boone	RB	Toledo	
2024	Harold Fannin Jr.	TE	Bowling Green	
2025	Broc Lowry	QB	Western Michigan	

=== Winners by school ===
School	Wins	Seasons
Western Michigan	10	1976, 1977, 1978, 1988, 2000, 2005, 2014, 2016, 2019, 2025
Bowling Green	9	1973, 1983, 1984, 1985, 1991, 1992, 2004, 2015, 2024
Toledo	9	1967, 1969, 1970, 1971, 1974, 1975, 1995, 2017, 2023
Northern Illinois	7	1978, 2006, 2010, 2011, 2012, 2013, 2021
Central Michigan	6	1979, 1982, 1990, 1994, 2007, 2009
Miami (OH)	5	1966, 1972, 1986, 1998, 2003
Ball State	4	1980, 1989, 1993, 2008
Marshall	4	1997, 1999, 2001, 2002
Ohio	4	1968, 1981, 1996, 2022
Kent State	3	1965, 1987, 2021
Buffalo	2	2018, 2020

== Defensive Player of the Year ==
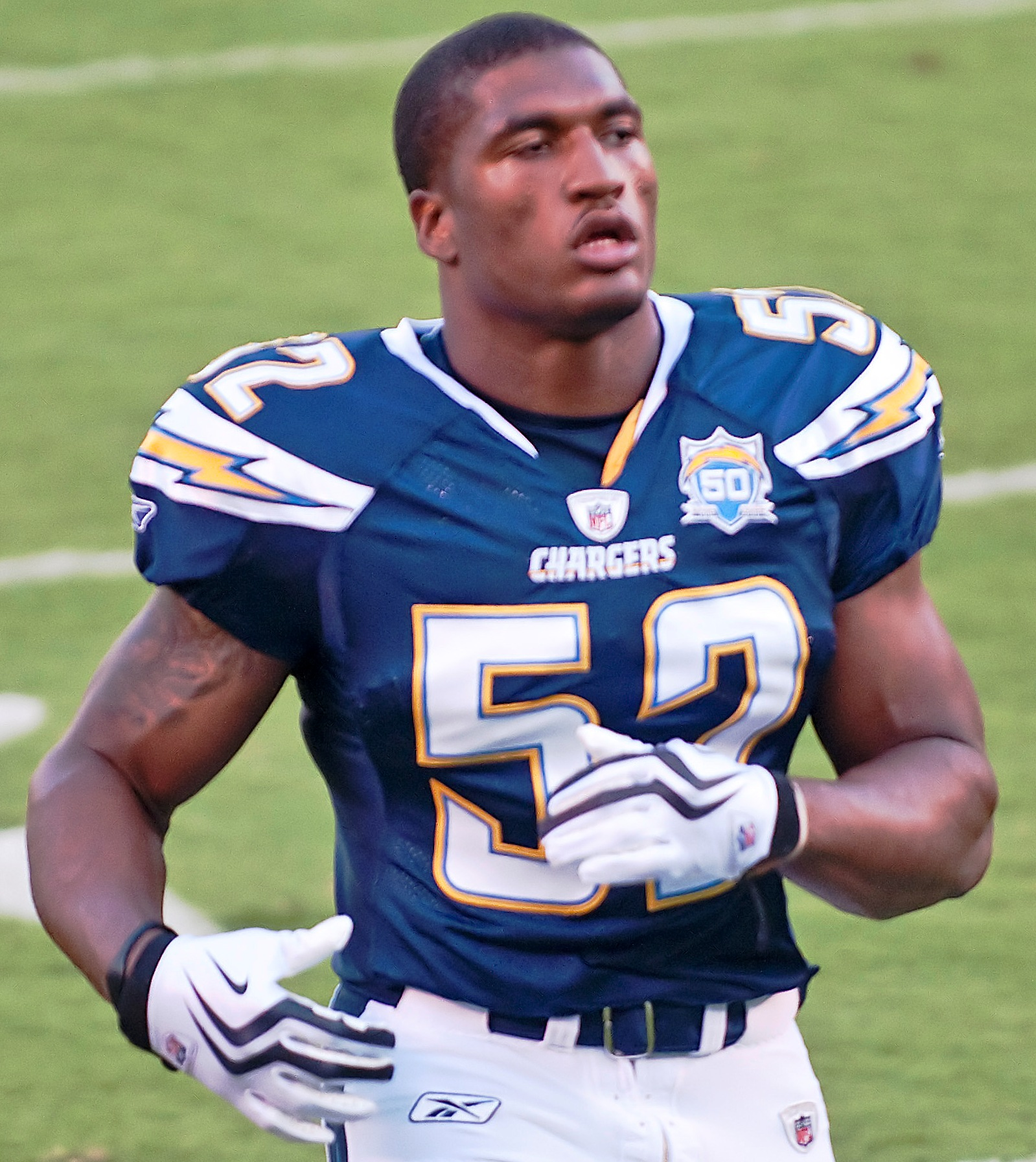
Larry English won the award in 2008. He also won the Vern Smith award in that same year.

=== Winners ===
Season	Player	Pos	Team	Ref
1965	Bob Rowe	DT	Western Michigan	
1966	Bob Rowe (2)	DT	Western Michigan	
1967	Tom Beutler	DT	Toledo	
1968	Bob Babich	LB	Miami (OH)	
1969	Joe Green	DT	Bowling Green	
1970	Dick Adams	DB	Miami (OH)	
1970	Phil Villapiano	DE	Bowling Green	
1971	Mel Long	DT	Toledo	
1972	Jack Lambert	LB	Kent State	
1973	Brad Cousino	DT	Miami (OH)	
1974	Brad Cousino (2)	DT	Miami (OH)	
1975	Shafer Suggs	S	Ball State	
1976	Aaron Bivins	LB	Toledo	
1977	Jack Glowik	DT	Miami (OH)	
1978	Ken Kremer	DT	Ball State	
1979	Frank Lewandowski	LB	Northern Illinois	
1980	Kent McCormick	LB	Miami (OH)	
1980	Mike Terra	LB	Northern Illinois	
1981	John Zupancic	LB	Miami (OH)	
1982	Ray Bentley	LB	Central Michigan	
1983	Brian Pillman	DT	Miami (OH)	
1984	Mark Brandon	CB	Toledo	
1985	John Offerdahl	LB	Western Michigan	
1986	Mark Garalczyk	DT	Western Michigan	
1987	Greg Garnica	LB	Ball State	
1988	Greg Garnica (2)	LB	Ball State	
1989	Greg Garnica (3)	LB	Ball State	
1990	Sean Mulhearn	LB	Western Michigan	
1991	Curt McMillan	LB	Miami (OH)	
1992	Curt McMillan (2)	LB	Miami (OH)	
1993	Vince Palko	LB	Bowling Green	
1994	Vince Palko (2)	LB	Bowling Green	
1995	Johnnie Williams	S	Miami (OH)	
1996	Brad Maynard	P	Ball State	
1997	JoJuan Armour	LB	Miami (OH)	
1998	JoJuan Armour (2)	LB	Miami (OH)	
1999	Dustin Cohen	LB	Miami (OH)	
2000	Dwight Smith	S	Akron	
2001	Max Yates	LB	Marshall	
2002	Jason Babin	DE	Western Michigan	
2003	Jason Babin (2)	DE	Western Michigan	
2004	Johnathan Goddard	DE	Marshall	
2005	Dan Bazuin	DE	Central Michigan	
2006	Ameer Ismail	LB	Western Michigan	
2007	Clayton Mullins	LB	Miami (OH)	
2008	Larry English	DE	Northern Illinois	
2009	Adrian Robinson	DE	Temple	
2010	Roosevelt Nix	DE	Kent State	
2011	Drew Nowak	DT	Western Michigan	
2012	Chris Jones	DT	Bowling Green	
2013	Khalil Mack	LB	Buffalo	
2014	Quinten Rollins	CB	Miami (OH)	
2015	Jatavis Brown	LB	Akron	
2016	Tarell Basham	DE	Ohio	
2017	Sutton Smith	DE	Northern Illinois	
2018	Sutton Smith (2)	DE	Northern Illinois	
2019	Treshaun Hayward	LB	Western Michigan	
2020	Troy Hairston	LB	Central Michigan	
2020	Brandon Martin	LB	Ball State	
2021	Ali Fayad	DE	Western Michigan	
2022	Jose Ramirez	DE	Eastern Michigan	
2023	Matt Salopek	LB	Miami (OH)	
2024	Shaun Dolac	LB	Buffalo	
2025	Nadame Tucker	DE	Western Michigan	

=== Winners by school ===
School	Wins	Seasons
Miami (OH)	17	1968, 1970, 1973, 1974, 1977, 1980, 1981, 1983, 1991, 1992, 1995, 1997, 1998, 1999, 2007, 2014, 2023
Western Michigan	12	1965, 1966, 1985, 1986, 1990, 2002, 2003, 2006, 2011, 2019, 2021, 2025
Ball State	7	1975, 1978, 1987, 1988, 1989, 1996, 2020
Bowling Green	5	1969, 1970, 1993, 1994, 2012
Northern Illinois	5	1979, 1980, 2008, 2017, 2018
Toledo	4	1967, 1971, 1976, 1984
Central Michigan	3	1982, 2005, 2020
Akron	2	2000, 2005
Buffalo	2	2013, 2024
Kent State	2	1972, 2010
Marshall	2	2001, 2004
Ohio	1	2016
Temple	1	2009
Eastern Michigan	1	2022

== Special Teams Player of the Year ==
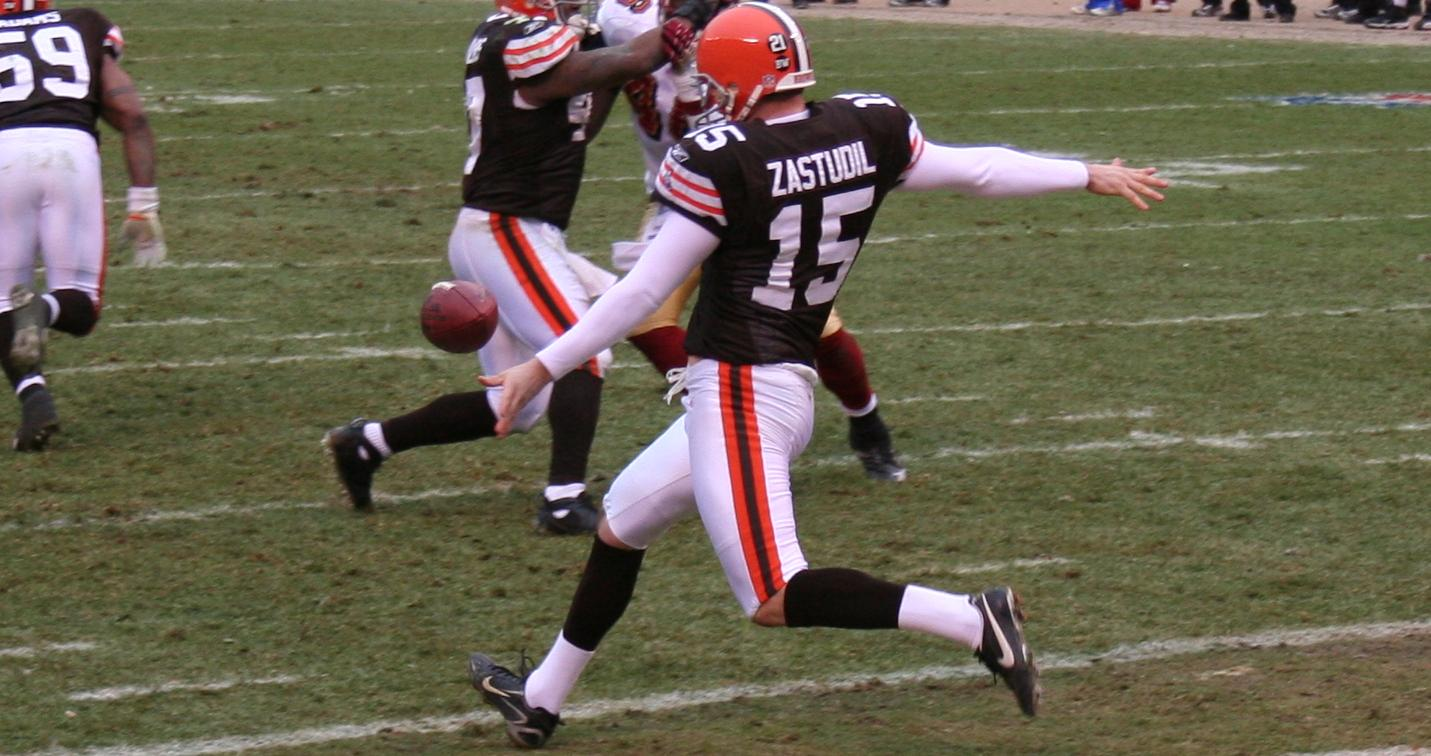
Dave Zastudil is one of two two-time award winners. He shared the award with the other two-time winner, Steve Azar.

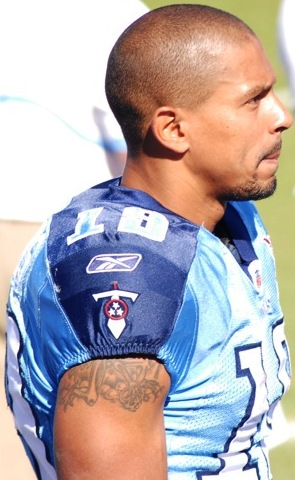
Justin McCareins, shown here playing for the Tennessee Titans, is one of three Northern Illinois players to win the award.

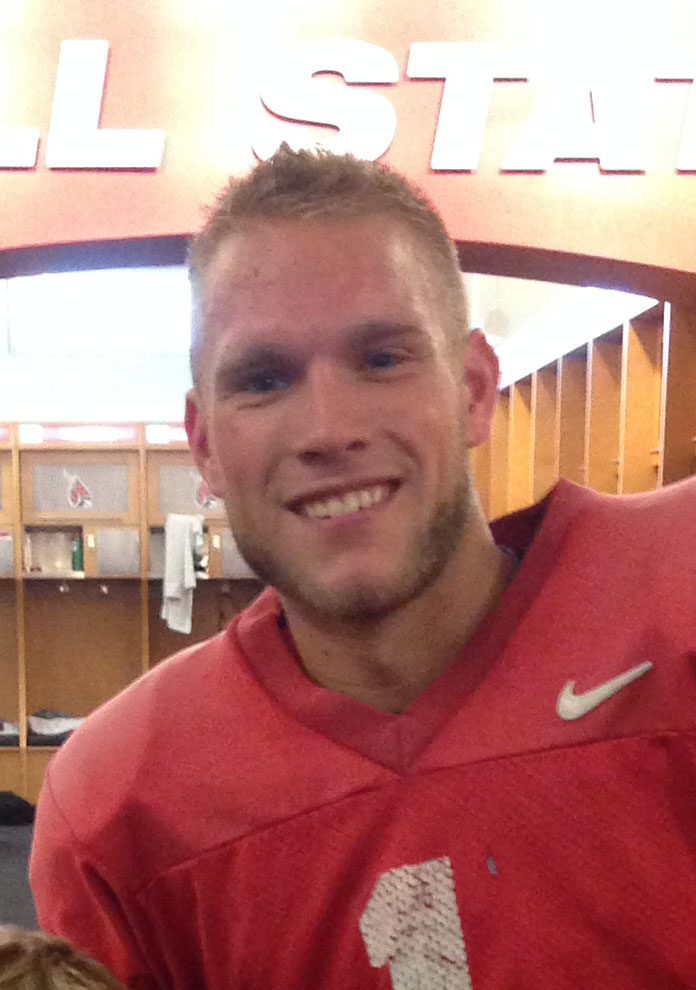
Scott Secor, 2014 Special Teams Player of the Year award winner.

=== Winners ===
Season	Player	Pos	Team	Ref
1998	Brad Selent	K	Western Michigan	
1999	Dave Zastudil	P	Ohio	
2000	Justin McCareins	RS	Northern Illinois	
2001	Dave Zastudil (2)	P	Ohio	
2001	Steve Azar	K	Northern Illinois	
2002	Dan Sheldon	RS	Northern Illinois	
2003	Steve Azar (2)	K	Northern Illinois	
2004	Ryne Robinson	RS	Miami (OH)	
2005	Jason Robbins	K	Toledo	
2006	Brian Jackson	K	Ball State	
2007	Brett Kern	P	Toledo	
2008	Antonio Brown	RS	Central Michigan	
2009	Antonio Brown (2)	RS	Central Michigan	
2010	Eric Page	RS	Toledo	
2011	Matt Weller	K	Ohio	
2012	Dri Archer	RS	Kent State	
2013	Jeremiah Detmer	K	Toledo	
2014	Scott Secor	K	Ball State	
2015	Aregeros Turner	RS	Northern Illinois	
2016	Darius Phillips	RS	Western Michigan	
2017	Darius Phillips (2)	RS	Western Michigan	
2018	Diontae Johnson	RS	Toledo	
2019	Matthew Trickett	K	Kent State	
2020	D'Wayne Eskridge	RS	Western Michigan	
2021	Khalil Pimpleton	RS	Central Michigan	
2022	Alex McNulty	K	Buffalo	
2023	Graham Nicholson	K	Miami (OH)	
2024	Malcolm Gillie	RS	Ball State	
2025	Da’Realyst Clark	RS	Kent State	

=== Winners by school ===
School	Wins	Years
Northern Illinois	5	2000, 2001, 2002, 2003, 2015
Toledo	5	2005, 2007, 2010, 2013, 2018
Western Michigan	4	1998, 2016, 2017, 2020
Ball State	3	2006, 2014, 2024
Central Michigan	3	2008, 2009, 2021
Kent State	3	2012, 2019, 2025
Ohio	3	1999, 2001, 2011
Miami (OH)	2	2004, 2023
Buffalo	1	2022

== Freshman Player of the Year ==
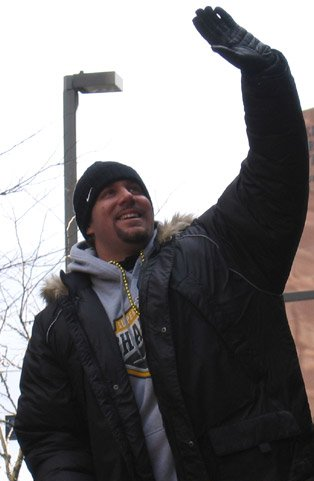
Ben Roethlisberger won the award in 2001. Today, his number 7 is retired by the Miami RedHawks and he has led the Pittsburgh Steelers to two Super Bowl victories.

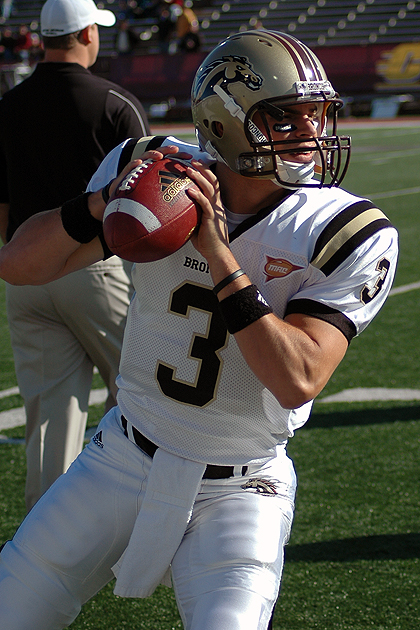
Tim Hiller, the 2005 winner, was one of NFL.com's Top 5 senior quarterback prospects in 2009.

The Freshman Player of the Year award was first given by the MAC after the 1982 football season. That year's winner, Brian McClure, won a slew of MAC accords, including Offensive Player of the Year three times, and the Vern Smith award twice. Western Michigan is the team with the most awards, with ten award winners.

=== Winners ===
Season	Player	Pos	Team	Ref
1982	Brian McClure	QB	Bowling Green	
1983	Kelly Spielmaker	TE	Western Michigan	
1984	Pete Genatempo	QB	Northern Illinois	
1985	Marshall Taylor	QB	Northern Illinois	
1986	Patrick Young	QB	Kent State	
1987	Bernie Parmalee	RB	Ball State	
1988	Jeff Bender	QB	Central Michigan	
1989	Brad Tayles	QB	Western Michigan	
1990	Troy Parker	RB	Toledo	
1991	Morrey Norris	LB	Kent State	
1992	Deland McCullough	RB	Miami (OH)	
1993	Michael Blair	RB	Ball State	
1994	Astron Whatley	RB	Kent State	
1995	Silas Massey III	RB	Central Michigan	
1996	Walter Church	QB	Eastern Michigan	
1996	Tim Lester	QB	Western Michigan	
1997	Robert Sanford	RB	Western Michigan	
1998	Kurt Gerling	WR	Bowling Green	
1999	Brandon Payne	RB	Akron	
2000	Talmadge Hill	QB	Ball State	
2001	Ben Roethlisberger	QB	Miami (OH)	
2002	Aaron Leeper	RB	Buffalo	
2003	Jerry Seymour	RB	Central Michigan	
2004	Adell Givens	RB	Ball State	
2005	Tim Hiller	QB	Western Michigan	
2006	Dan LeFevour	QB	Central Michigan	
2007	Antonio Brown	WR/RS	Central Michigan	
2008	Sean Baker	S	Ball State	
2009	Bernard Pierce	RB	Temple	
2010	Roosevelt Nix	DE	Kent State	
2011	Anthon Samuel	RB	Bowling Green	
2012	Jamie Wilson	WR	Western Michigan	
2013	Corey Davis	WR	Western Michigan	
2014	Jarvion Franklin	RB	Western Michigan	
2015	Jamauri Bogan	RB	Western Michigan	
2016	Javon Hagan	S	Ohio	
2017	Marcus Childers	QB	Northern Illinois	
2018	Jaret Patterson	RB	Buffalo	
2019	Brett Gabbert	QB	Miami (OH)	
2020	Lew Nichols III	RB	Central Michigan	
2021	Jay Ducker	RB	Northern Illinois	
2022	Sieh Bangura	RB	Ohio	
2023	Jalen Buckley	RB	Western Michigan	
2024	Kadin Semonza	QB	Ball State	
2025	Cameron Pettaway	RB	Bowling Green	

=== Winners by school ===
School	Wins	Seasons
Western Michigan	10	1983, 1989, 1996, 1997, 2005, 2012, 2013, 2014, 2015, 2023
Ball State	6	1987, 1993, 2000, 2004, 2008, 2024
Central Michigan	6	1988, 1995, 2003, 2006, 2007, 2020
Bowling Green	4	1982, 1998, 2011, 2025
Kent State	4	1986, 1991, 1994, 2010
Miami (OH)	3	1992, 2001, 2019
Northern Illinois	2	1984, 1985, 2017
Buffalo	2	2002, 2018
Ohio	2	2016, 2022
Akron	1	1999
Eastern Michigan	1	1996
Temple	1	2009
Toledo	1	1990

== Vern Smith Leadership Award ==
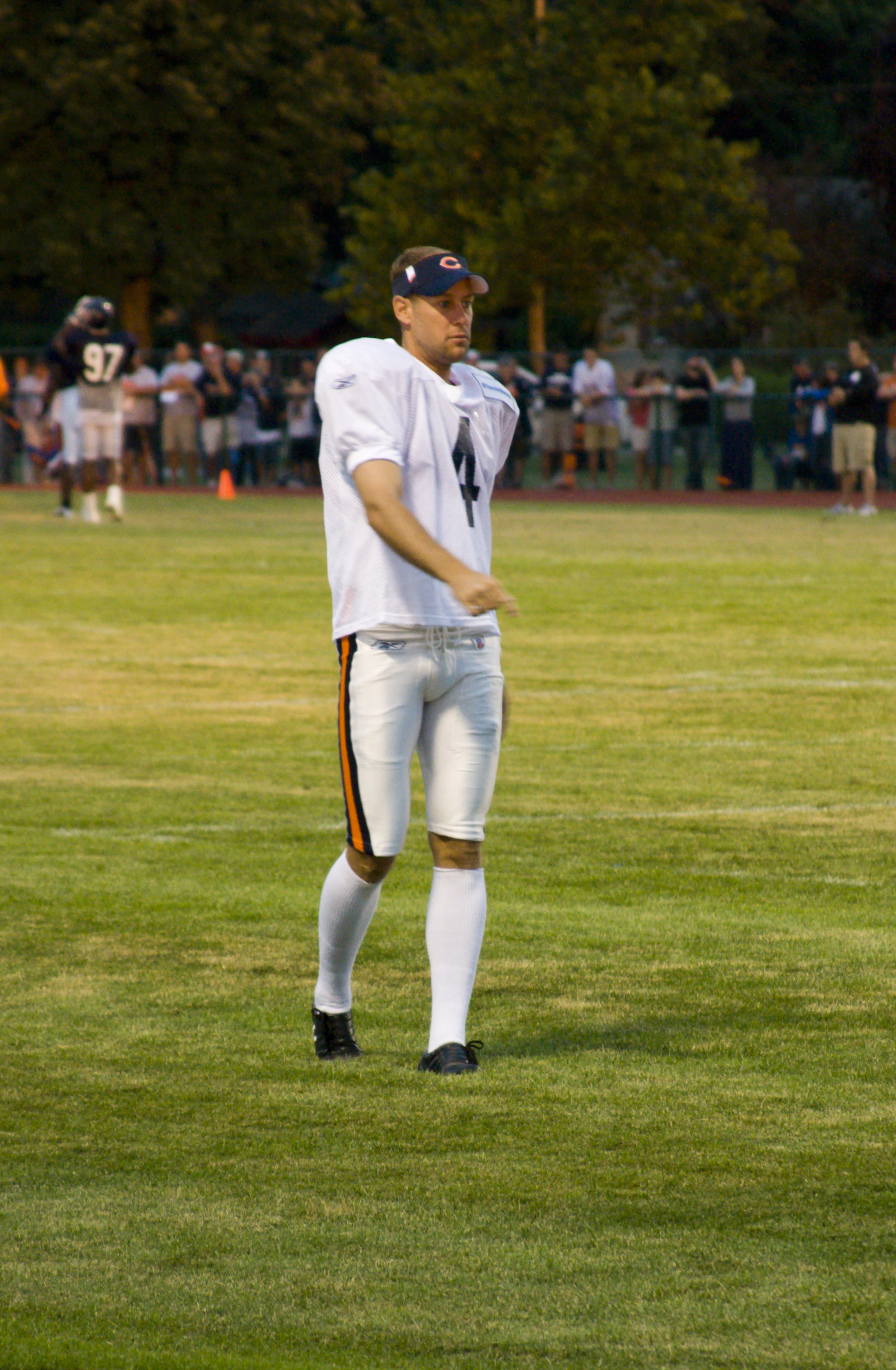
Brad Maynard is the only special teams player to win the award.

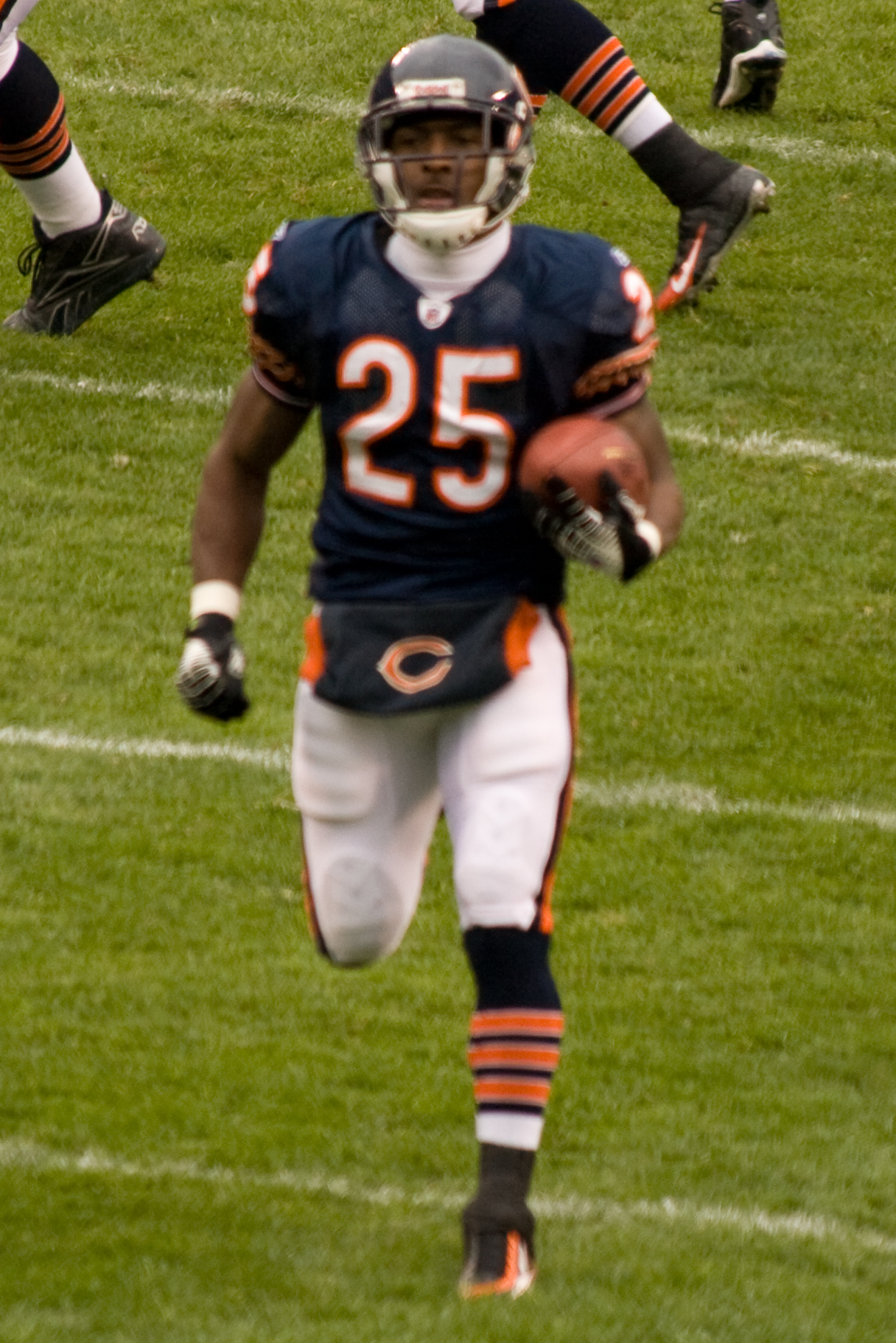
Garrett Wolfe won the award in 2006 after setting many MAC rushing records.

The Vern Smith Leadership Award was started in 1982 by the Downtown Toledo Athletic Club. In that year, it was known as the Jefferson Award and the name was changed to honor the University of Toledo Athletic Director Vern Smith in 1987. The award is given to the top football player in the Mid-American Conference (MAC). Only four players have won the award multiple times, Larry English being the only non-quarterback to win it twice. In 1996, Brad Maynard won the award, and is the only special teams player to win the award as of the end of the 2025 season. The Northern Illinois Huskies leads with seven awards all-time. The Vern Smith award is the only one voted on by the coaches, with the Coach of the Year, as well as the Players of the Year are selected by the media.

=== Winners ===
Season	Player	Pos	Team	Ref
1982	Ray Bentley	LB	Central Michigan	
1983	Tim Tyrrell	QB	Northern Illinois	
1984	Brian McClure	QB	Bowling Green	
1985	Brian McClure (2)	QB	Bowling Green	
1986	Terry Morris	QB	Miami (OH)	
1987	Eric Wilkerson	RB	Kent State	
1988	Tony Kimbrough	QB	Western Michigan	
1989	David Riley	QB	Ball State	
1990	Jeff Bender	QB	Central Michigan	
1991	Erik White	QB	Bowling Green	
1992	Erik White (2)	QB	Bowling Green	
1993	Mike Neu	QB	Ball State	
1994	Brian Pruitt	RB	Central Michigan	
1995	Wasean Tait	RB	Toledo	
1996	Brad Maynard	P	Ball State	
1997	Randy Moss	WR	Marshall	
1998	Travis Prentice	RB	Miami (OH)	
1999	Chad Pennington	QB	Marshall	
2000	Robert Sanford	RB	Western Michigan	
2001	Byron Leftwich	QB	Marshall	
2002	Byron Leftwich (2)	QB	Marshall	
2003	Ben Roethlisberger	QB	Miami (OH)	
2004	Charlie Frye	QB	Akron	
2005	Bruce Gradkowski	QB	Toledo	
2005	Greg Jennings	WR	Western Michigan	
2006	Garrett Wolfe	RB	Northern Illinois	
2007	Larry English	DE	Northern Illinois	
2008	Larry English (2)	DE	Northern Illinois	
2009	Dan LeFevour	QB	Central Michigan	
2010	Chad Spann	RB	Northern Illinois	
2011	Chandler Harnish	QB	Northern Illinois	
2012	Jordan Lynch	QB	Northern Illinois	
2013	Jordan Lynch (2)	QB	Northern Illinois	
2014	Greg Mancz	C	Toledo	
2015	Matt Johnson	QB	Bowling Green	
2016	Zach Terrell	QB	Western Michigan	
2017	Logan Woodside	QB	Toledo	
2018	Sutton Smith	DE	Northern Illinois	
2019	LeVante Bellamy	RB	Western Michigan	
2020	Jaret Patterson	RB	Buffalo	
2021	Dustin Crum	QB	Kent State	
2022	Kurtis Rourke	QB	Ohio	
2023	Dequan Finn	QB	Toledo	
2024	Harold Fannin Jr.	TE	Bowling Green	
2025	Nadame Tucker	DE	Western Michigan	

=== Winners by school ===
School	Wins	Seasons
Northern Illinois	9	1983, 2006, 2007, 2008, 2010, 2011, 2012, 2013, 2018
Bowling Green	6	1984, 1985, 1991, 1992, 2015, 2024
Toledo	5	1995, 2005, 2014, 2017, 2023
Western Michigan	5	1988, 2000, 2005, 2016, 2025
Central Michigan	4	1982, 1990, 1994, 2009
Marshall	4	1997, 1999, 2001, 2002
Ball State	3	1989, 1993, 1996
Miami (OH)	3	1986, 1998, 2003
Kent State	2	1987, 2021
Buffalo	1	2020
Akron	1	2004
Ohio	1	2022

== Coach of the Year ==
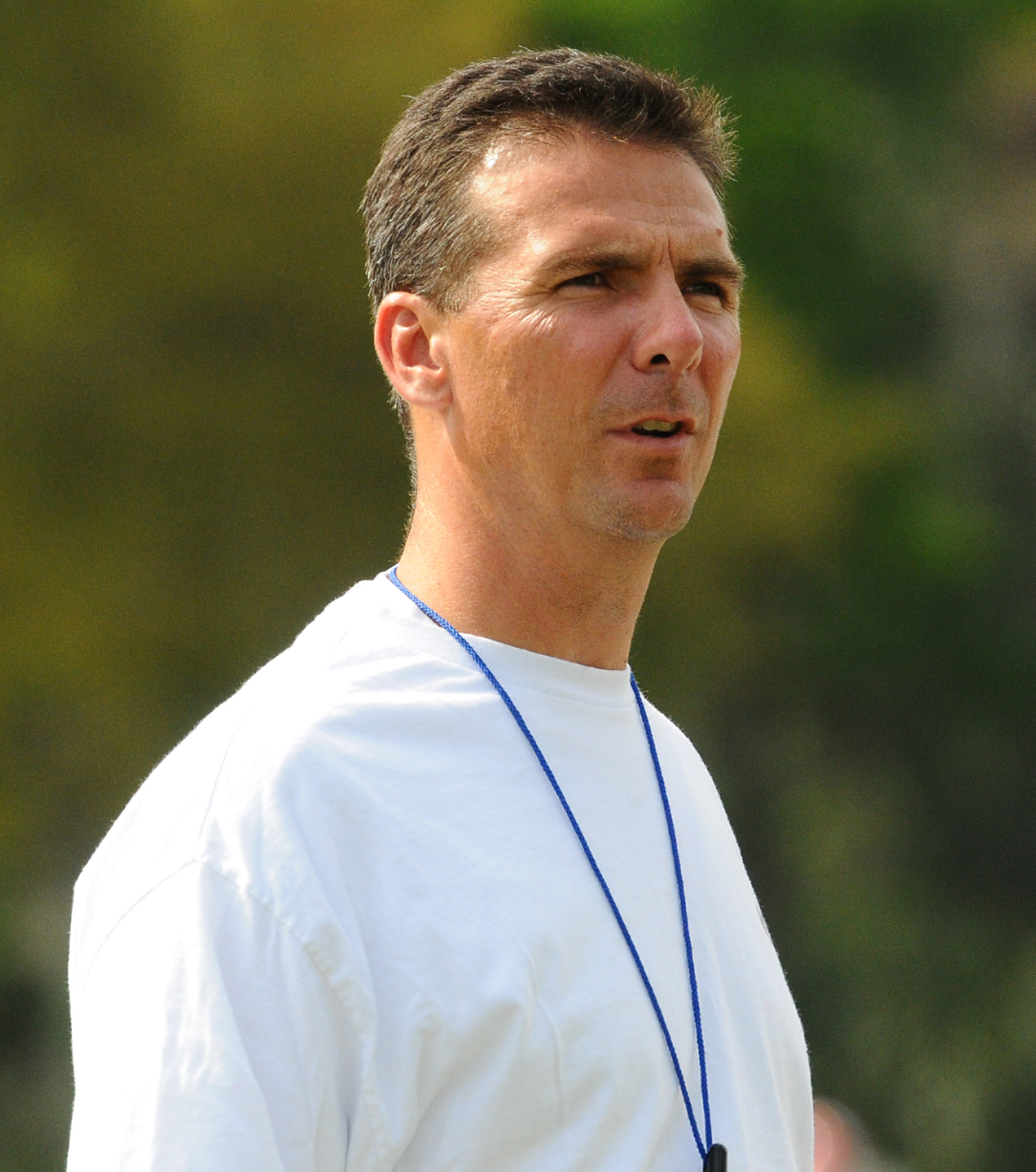
Urban Meyer won the award in 2001 with Bowling Green, before coaching at Utah, Florida and Ohio State.

The MAC has awarded a Coach of the Year award every year since 1965. The first award went to Bo Schembechler of Miami University. Only one coach has won the award more than twice, with Frank Lauterbur winning the award in 1967, 1969, and 1970. Only two coaches have won the award beyond their tenth year of coaching. Bill Hess won the award in 1968 in his 11th year of coaching the Ohio Bobcats and Herb Deromedi won the award in 1990, his 13th year of coaching Central Michigan. Also, only one coach, Bill Mallory, has won the award coaching two separate teams. He first earned the award in 1973 while coaching Miami University, and then won ten years later giving Northern Illinois their first Coach of the Year award. Toledo leads all schools with nine awards. Temple won their first award in 2009 when head coach Al Golden won his first MAC Coach of the Year award.

=== Winners ===
Coach (X)	Denotes the number of times the coach has been selected

Season	Coach	School	Year with school	Record
1965	Bo Schembechler	Miami	3rd	7–3 (5–1)
1966	Bill Doolittle	Western Michigan	3rd	7–3 (5–1)
1967	Frank Lauterbur	Toledo	5th	9–1 (5–1)
1968	Bill Hess	Ohio	11th	10–1 (6–0)
1969	Frank Lauterbur (2)	Toledo	7th	11–0 (5–0)
1970	Frank Lauterbur (3)	Toledo	8th	12–0 (5–0)
1971	John Murphy	Toledo	1st	12–0 (5–0)
1972	Don James	Kent State	1st	6–5 (4–1)
1973	Bill Mallory	Miami	5th	11–0 (5–0)
1974	Dick Crum	Miami	1st	10–0–1 (5–0)
1975	Dave McClain	Ball State	1st	9–2 (4–2)
1976	Elliot Uzelac	Western Michigan	2nd	7–4 (6–3)
1977	Ed Chlebek	Eastern Michigan	2nd	8–3 (4–3)
1978	Dwight Wallace	Ball State	1st	10–1 (8–0)
1979	Chuck Stobart	Toledo	3rd	7–3–1 (7–1–1)
1980	Herb Deromedi	Central Michigan	3rd	9–2 (7–2)
1981	Chuck Stobart (2)	Toledo	5th	9–3 (8–1)
1982	Denny Stolz	Bowling Green	6th	7–5 (7–2)
1983	Bill Mallory (2)	Northern Illinois	3rd	10–2 (8–1)
1984	Dan Simrell	Toledo	3rd	9–2–1 (7–1–1)
1985	Denny Stolz (2)	Bowling Green	9th	11–1 (9–0)
1986	Glen Mason	Kent State	1st	5–6 (5–3)
1987	Jim Harkema	Eastern Michigan	5th	10–2 (7–1)
1988	Al Molde	Western Michigan	2nd	9–3 (7–1)
1989	Paul Schudel	Ball State	5th	7–3–2 (6–1–1)
1990	Herb Deromedi (2)	Central Michigan	13th	8–3–1 (7–1)
1991	Gary Blackney	Bowling Green	1st	11–1 (8–0)
1992	Gary Blackney (2)	Bowling Green	2nd	10–2 (8–0)
1993	Paul Schudel (2)	Ball State	9th	8–3–1 (7–0–1)
1994	Dick Flynn	Central Michigan	1st	9–3 (8–1)
1995	Gary Pinkel	Toledo	5th	11–0–1 (7–0–1)
1996	Jim Grobe	Ohio	2nd	6–6 (5–3)
1997	Gary Pinkel (2)	Toledo	7th	9–3 (7–1)
1998	Bob Pruett	Marshall	2nd	12–1 (7–1)
1999	Bob Pruett (2)	Marshall	3rd	13–0 (8–0)
2000	Gary Darnell	Western Michigan	4th	9–3 (7–1)
2001	Urban Meyer	Bowling Green	1st	8–3 (5–3)
2002	Joe Novak	Northern Illinois	6th	8–4 (7–1)
2003	Terry Hoeppner	Miami	5th	13–1 (8–0)
2004	J. D. Brookhart	Akron	1st	6–5 (6–2)
2005	Bill Cubit	Western Michigan	1st	7–4 (5–3)
2006	Frank Solich	Ohio	2nd	9–5 (7–1)
2007	Turner Gill	Buffalo	2nd	5–7 (5–3)
2008	Brady Hoke	Ball State	6th	12–2 (8–0)
2009	Al Golden	Temple	3rd	9–3 (7–1)
2010	Michael Haywood	Miami	2nd	9–4 (8–1)
2011	Ron English	Eastern Michigan	3rd	6–6 (4–4)
2012	Darrell Hazell	Kent State	2nd	11–3 (8–0)
2013	Rod Carey	Northern Illinois	1st	12–1 (8–0)
2014	P. J. Fleck	Western Michigan	2nd	8–5 (6–2)
2015	Matt Campbell	Toledo	5th	9–2 (6–2)
2016	P. J. Fleck (2)	Western Michigan	4th	13–1 (8–0)
2017	Jason Candle	Toledo	2nd	11–3 (7–1)
2018	Lance Leipold	Buffalo	4th	10–4 (7–1)
2019	Jim McElwain	Central Michigan	1st	8–6 (6–2)
2020	Lance Leipold (2)	Buffalo	6th	6–1 (5–0)
2021	Thomas Hammock	Northern Illinois	3rd	9–5 (6–2)
2022	Tim Albin	Ohio	2nd	10–4 (7–1)
2023	Jason Candle (2)	Toledo	8th	11–3 (8–0)
2024	Tim Albin (2)	Ohio	4th	11–3 (7–1)
2025	Lance Taylor	Western Michigan	3rd	8–4 (7–1)

=== Winners by school ===
School (First season)	Wins	Years
Toledo (1952)	11	1967, 1969, 1970, 1971, 1979, 1871, 1984, 1995, 1997, 2015, 2017, 2023
Western Michigan (1948)	8	1966, 1976, 1988, 2000, 2005, 2014, 2016, 2025
Central Michigan (1975)	6	1980, 1990, 1994, 1977, 1987, 2019
Miami (1948)	5	1965, 1973, 1974, 2003, 2010
Ball State (1975)	5	1975, 1978, 1989, 1993, 2008
Bowling Green (1952)	5	1982, 1985, 1991, 1991, 2001
Ohio (1947)	5	1968, 1996, 2006, 2022, 2024
Northern Illinois (1975)	4	1983, 2002, 2013, 2021
Eastern Michigan (1976)	3	1977, 1987, 2011
Kent State (1951)	3	1972, 1986, 2012
Buffalo (1999)	3	2007, 2018. 2020
Marshall (1954)	2	1988, 1999
Akron (1992)	1	2004
Temple (2007)	1	2009
Butler (1947)	0	
Cincinnati (1947)	0	
Central Florida (2002)	0	
UMass (2011)	0	
