= 1983 Kent State Golden Flashes football team =

American college football season

1983 Kent State Golden Flashes football
- Conference: Mid-American Conference
- Record: 1–10 (1–8 MAC)
- Head coach: Dick Scesniak (1st season)
- Offensive coordinator: John O'Grady (1st season)
- Home stadium: Dix Stadium

1983 Mid-American Conference football standings
	Conf.					Overall
Team	W		L		T	W		L		T
Northern Illinois $	8	–	1	–	0	10	–	2	–	0
Toledo	7	–	2	–	0	9	–	2	–	0
Bowling Green	7	–	2	–	0	8	–	3	–	0
Central Michigan	7	–	2	–	0	8	–	3	–	0
Ball State	4	–	4	–	0	6	–	5	–	0
Western Michigan	4	–	5	–	0	6	–	5	–	0
Miami (OH)	3	–	5	–	0	4	–	7	–	0
Ohio	3	–	6	–	0	4	–	7	–	0
Kent State	1	–	8	–	0	1	–	10	–	0
Eastern Michigan	0	–	9	–	0	1	–	10	–	0
$ – Conference champion

The 1983 Kent State Golden Flashes football team was an American football team that represented Kent State University in the Mid-American Conference (MAC) during the 1983 NCAA Division I-A football season. In their first season under head coach Dick Scesniak, the Golden Flashes compiled a 1–10 record (1–8 against MAC opponents), finished in ninth place in the MAC, and were outscored by all opponents by a combined total of 260 to 157.

The team's statistical leaders included O.D. Underwood with 531 rushing yards, Stu Rayburn with 1,461 passing yards, and Ken Hughes with 575 receiving yards.

== Schedule ==
Date	Opponent	Site	Result	Attendance	Source
September 3	at Akron*	Rubber Bowl; Akron, OH (Wagon Wheel)	L 6–13	37,111	
September 10	at Syracuse*	Carrier Dome; Syracuse, NY	L 10–22	24,605	
September 24	Northern Illinois	Dix Stadium; Kent, OH	L 7–38	8,321	
October 1	at Central Michigan	Perry Shorts Stadium; Mount Pleasant, MI	L 7–13	23,163	
October 8	at Miami (OH)	Yager Stadium; Oxford, OH	L 7–27	24,975	
October 15	Ball State	Dix Stadium; Kent, OH	L 13–17	7,300	
October 22	Ohio	Dix Stadium; Kent, OH	L 20–21	4,000	
October 29	at Toledo	Glass Bowl; Toledo, OH	L 34–37	19,473	
November 5	Eastern Michigan	Dix Stadium; Kent, OH	W 37–13		
November 12	Western Michigan	Dix Stadium; Kent, OH	L 13–21	4,100	
November 19	at Bowling Green	Doyt Perry Stadium; Bowling Green, OH (rivalry)	L 3–38	11,100	
*Non-conference game
