= 1981 Central Michigan Chippewas football team =

American college football season

1981 Central Michigan Chippewas football
- Conference: Mid-American Conference
- Record: 7–4 (7–2 MAC)
- Head coach: Herb Deromedi (4th season)
- MVP: Reggie Mitchell
- Home stadium: Perry Shorts Stadium

1981 Mid-American Conference football standings
	Conf.					Overall
Team	W		L		T	W		L		T
Toledo $	8	–	1	–	0	9	–	3	–	0
Miami (OH)	6	–	1	–	1	8	–	2	–	1
Central Michigan	7	–	2	–	0	7	–	4	–	0
Bowling Green	5	–	3	–	1	5	–	5	–	1
Western Michigan	5	–	4	–	0	6	–	5	–	0
Ohio	5	–	4	–	0	5	–	6	–	0
Kent State	3	–	6	–	0	4	–	7	–	0
Ball State	2	–	6	–	0	4	–	7	–	0
Northern Illinois	2	–	7	–	0	3	–	8	–	0
Eastern Michigan	0	–	9	–	0	0	–	11	–	0
$ – Conference champion

The 1981 Central Michigan Chippewas football team represented Central Michigan University in the Mid-American Conference (MAC) during the 1981 NCAA Division I-A football season. In their fourth season under head coach Herb Deromedi, the Chippewas compiled a 7–4 record (7–2 against MAC opponents), finished in third place in the MAC standings, and outscored their opponents, 223 to 131. The team played its home games in Perry Shorts Stadium in Mount Pleasant, Michigan, with attendance of 104,310 in five home games.

The team's statistical leaders included quarterback Bob DeMarco with 1,159 passing yards, Reggie Mitchell with 1,068 rushing yards, and tight end Mike Hirn with 295 receiving yards. Mitchell received the team's most valuable player award. Six Central Michigan players including Hirn, Mitchell, offensive tackle Tony Vitale, defensive end Kurt Dobronski, linebacker Ray Bentley, and defensive back Bruce Brownie; received first-team All-MAC honors.

== Schedule ==
Date	Opponent	Site	Result	Source
September 5	at Pacific (CA)*	Pacific Memorial Stadium; Stockton, CA	L 3–10	
September 19	Northern Illinois	Perry Shorts Stadium; Mount Pleasant, MI	W 17–10	
September 26	Arkansas State*	Perry Shorts Stadium; Mount Pleasant, MI	L 23–26	
October 3	Eastern Michigan	Perry Shorts Stadium; Mount Pleasant, MI (rivalry)	W 63–14	
October 10	at Western Michigan	Waldo Stadium; Kalamazoo, MI (rivalry)	W 15–13	
October 17	at Toledo	Glass Bowl; Toledo, OH	L 3–17	
October 24	Kent State	Perry Shorts Stadium; Mount Pleasant, MI	W 24–3	
October 31	at Ohio	Peden Stadium; Athens, OH	W 38–21	
November 7	Miami (OH)	Perry Shorts Stadium; Mount Pleasant, MI	L 3–7	
November 14	at Ball State	Ball State Stadium; Muncie, IN	W 28–7	
November 21	at Bowling Green	Doyt Perry Stadium; Bowling Green, OH	W 6–3	
*Non-conference game

== Roster ==
1981 Central Michigan Chippewas football team roster
Players
Coaches
Offense

Pos.	#	Name	Class
RB	22	Curtis Adams	Fr
QB	7	Stephen Jones	Jr
QB		Bob DeMarco
G	67	Tony Vitale	Sr
RB	31	Willie Todd	Sr
WR	24	Dave Weisenburger	Sr

Defense

Pos.	#	Name	Class
LB	57	Ray Bentley	Jr
DE	49	Dan O'Brien	Jr
DB	28	Mike McElrath	Sr

Special teams

Pos.	#	Name	Class
K	13	Novo Bojovic	Jr

Head coach

- Herb Deromedi

Coordinators/assistant coaches

Legend

- (C) Team captain
- (S) Suspended
- (I) Ineligible
- Injured
- Redshirt
