= 1981 Ball State Cardinals football team =

American college football season

1981 Ball State Cardinals football
- Conference: Mid-American Conference
- Record: 4–7 (2–6 MAC)
- Head coach: Dwight Wallace (4th season)
- Home stadium: Ball State Stadium

1981 Mid-American Conference football standings
	Conf.					Overall
Team	W		L		T	W		L		T
Toledo $	8	–	1	–	0	9	–	3	–	0
Miami (OH)	6	–	1	–	1	8	–	2	–	1
Central Michigan	7	–	2	–	0	7	–	4	–	0
Bowling Green	5	–	3	–	1	5	–	5	–	1
Western Michigan	5	–	4	–	0	6	–	5	–	0
Ohio	5	–	4	–	0	5	–	6	–	0
Kent State	3	–	6	–	0	4	–	7	–	0
Ball State	2	–	6	–	0	4	–	7	–	0
Northern Illinois	2	–	7	–	0	3	–	8	–	0
Eastern Michigan	0	–	9	–	0	0	–	11	–	0
$ – Conference champion

The 1981 Ball State Cardinals football team was an American football team that represented Ball State University in the Mid-American Conference (MAC) during the 1981 NCAA Division I-A football season. In its fourth season under head coach Dwight Wallace, the team compiled a 4–7 record (2–6 against MAC opponents) and finished in eighth place out of ten teams in the conference. The team played its home games at Ball State Stadium in Muncie, Indiana.

The team's statistical leaders included Doug Freed with 1,517 passing yards, Terry Lymon with 633 rushing yards, Stevie Nelson with 635 receiving yards, and Mike Schafer with 49 points scored.

== Schedule ==
Date	Opponent	Site	Result	Attendance	Source
September 12	McNeese State*	Ball State Stadium; Muncie, IN	W 24–21	14,337	
September 19	at Toledo	Glass Bowl; Toledo, OH	L 0–40	19,204	
September 26	at Ohio	Peden Stadium; Athens, OH	L 27–30		
October 3	Northern Illinois	Ball State Stadium; Muncie, IN (rivalry)	W 23–0	16,879	
October 10	at Indiana State*	Memorial Stadium; Terre Haute, IN (Blue Key Victory Bell)	L 7–31		
October 17	Kent State	Ball State Stadium; Muncie, IN	L 7–17		
October 24	at Western Michigan	Waldo Stadium; Kalamazoo, MI	L 3–14	14,027	
October 31	Eastern Michigan	Ball State Stadium; Muncie, IN	W 35–13	5,122	
November 7	Bowling Green	Ball State Stadium; Muncie, IN	L 10–14		
November 14	Central Michigan	Ball State Stadium; Muncie, IN	L 7–28		
November 21	at Illinois State*	Hancock Stadium; Normal, IL	W 14–10	4,832	
*Non-conference game
