= 1981 Toledo Rockets football team =

American college football season

1981 Toledo Rockets football

MAC champion

California Bowl, W 27–25 vs. San Jose State
- Conference: Mid-American Conference
- Record: 9–3 (8–1 MAC)
- Head coach: Chuck Stobart (5th season)
- Home stadium: Glass Bowl

1981 Mid-American Conference football standings
	Conf.					Overall
Team	W		L		T	W		L		T
Toledo $	8	–	1	–	0	9	–	3	–	0
Miami (OH)	6	–	1	–	1	8	–	2	–	1
Central Michigan	7	–	2	–	0	7	–	4	–	0
Bowling Green	5	–	3	–	1	5	–	5	–	1
Western Michigan	5	–	4	–	0	6	–	5	–	0
Ohio	5	–	4	–	0	5	–	6	–	0
Kent State	3	–	6	–	0	4	–	7	–	0
Ball State	2	–	6	–	0	4	–	7	–	0
Northern Illinois	2	–	7	–	0	3	–	8	–	0
Eastern Michigan	0	–	9	–	0	0	–	11	–	0
$ – Conference champion

The 1981 Toledo Rockets Football Team was an American football team that represented the University of Toledo in the Mid-American Conference (MAC) during the 1981 NCAA Division I-A football season. In their fifth and final season under head coach Chuck Stobart, the Rockets compiled a 9–3 record (8–1 against MAC opponents), won the MAC championship, outscored all opponents by a combined total of 270 to 170, won the Mid-American Conference (MAC) championship, and defeated San Jose State, 27–25, in the 1981 California Bowl.

The team's statistical leaders included Jim Kelso with 975 passing yards, Arnold Smiley with 1,013 rushing yards, and Rodney Achter with 361 receiving yards.

== Schedule ==
Date	Opponent	Site	Result	Attendance	Source
September 12	at Louisville*	Fairgrounds Stadium; Louisville, KY	L 6–31	21,226	
September 19	Ball State	Glass Bowl; Toledo, OH	W 40–0	19,204	
September 26	at East Carolina*	Ficklen Memorial Stadium; Greenville, NC	L 24–28	21,137	
October 3	Ohio	Glass Bowl; Glass Bowl	W 21–14		
October 10	at Eastern Michigan	Rynearson Stadium; Ypsilanti, MI	W 42–7		
October 17	Central Michigan	Glass Bowl; Toledo, OH	W 17–3	20,737	
October 24	at Bowling Green	Doyt Perry Stadium; Bowling Green, OH (rivalry)	L 0–38		
October 31	Miami (OH)	Glass Bowl; Toledo, OH	W 17–20		
November 7	at Western Michigan	Waldo Stadium; Kalamazoo, MI	W 28–14	17,784	
November 14	Kent State	Glass Bowl; Toledo, OH	W 17–0		
November 21	at Northern Illinois	Huskie Stadium; DeKalb, IL	W 31–0		
December 19	vs. San Jose State*	Bulldog Stadium; Fresno, CA (California Bowl)	W 27–25	15,565	
*Non-conference game

== After the season ==
=== NFL draft ===
The following Rocket was selected in the 1982 NFL draft following the season.

Round	Pick	Player	Position	NFL club
7	177	Jeff Jackson	Defensive end	Los Angeles Raiders
