= 1981 Kent State Golden Flashes football team =

American college football season

1981 Kent State Golden Flashes football
- Conference: Mid-American Conference
- Record: 4–7 (3–6 MAC)
- Head coach: Ed Chlebek (1st season)
- Home stadium: Dix Stadium

1981 Mid-American Conference football standings
	Conf.					Overall
Team	W		L		T	W		L		T
Toledo $	8	–	1	–	0	9	–	3	–	0
Miami (OH)	6	–	1	–	1	8	–	2	–	1
Central Michigan	7	–	2	–	0	7	–	4	–	0
Bowling Green	5	–	3	–	1	5	–	5	–	1
Western Michigan	5	–	4	–	0	6	–	5	–	0
Ohio	5	–	4	–	0	5	–	6	–	0
Kent State	3	–	6	–	0	4	–	7	–	0
Ball State	2	–	6	–	0	4	–	7	–	0
Northern Illinois	2	–	7	–	0	3	–	8	–	0
Eastern Michigan	0	–	9	–	0	0	–	11	–	0
$ – Conference champion

The 1981 Kent State Golden Flashes football team was an American football team that represented Kent State University in the Mid-American Conference (MAC) during the 1981 NCAA Division I-A football season. In their first season under head coach Ed Chlebek, the Golden Flashes compiled a 4–7 record (3–6 against MAC opponents), finished in seventh place in the MAC, and were outscored by all opponents by a combined total of 172 to 144.

The team's statistical leaders included Ron Pittman with 648 rushing yards, Bill Willows with 913 passing yards, and Todd Feldman with 470 receiving yards. Two Kent State players were selected as first-team All-MAC players: defensive back Charlie Grandjean and linebacker Russ Hedderly.

== Schedule ==
Date	Opponent	Site	Result	Attendance	Source
September 12	Western Michigan	Dix Stadium; Kent, OH	L 17–20		
September 19	Akron*	Dix Stadium; Kent, OH (Wagon Wheel)	W 17–6	13,169	
September 26	at Iowa State*	Cyclone Stadium; Ames, IA	L 19–28	50,594	
October 3	at Miami (OH)	Miami Field; Oxford, OH	L 13–20	20,080	
October 10	Northern Illinois^{†}	Dix Stadium; Kent, OH	W 31–10	21,053	
October 17	at Ball State	Ball State Stadium; Muncie, IN	W 17–7		
October 24	at Central Michigan	Perry Shorts Stadium; Mount Pleasant, MI	L 3–24		
October 31	at Bowling Green	Doyt Perry Stadium; Bowling Green, OH (rivalry)	L 7–13		
November 7	Eastern Michigan	Dix Stadium; Kent, OH	W 13–7	10,342	
November 14	at Toledo	Glass Bowl; Toledo, OH	L 0–17		
November 21	Ohio	Dix Stadium; Kent, OH	L 7–20	3,000	
*Non-conference game; ^{†}Homecoming
