= 1981 Western Michigan Broncos football team =

American college football season

1981 Western Michigan Broncos football
- Conference: Mid-American Conference
- Record: 6–5 (5–4 MAC)
- Head coach: Elliot Uzelac (7th season)
- MVP: Bob Phillips
- Captains: Reggie Hinton; John Schuster
- Home stadium: Waldo Stadium

1981 Mid-American Conference football standings
	Conf.					Overall
Team	W		L		T	W		L		T
Toledo $	8	–	1	–	0	9	–	3	–	0
Miami (OH)	6	–	1	–	1	8	–	2	–	1
Central Michigan	7	–	2	–	0	7	–	4	–	0
Bowling Green	5	–	3	–	1	5	–	5	–	1
Western Michigan	5	–	4	–	0	6	–	5	–	0
Ohio	5	–	4	–	0	5	–	6	–	0
Kent State	3	–	6	–	0	4	–	7	–	0
Ball State	2	–	6	–	0	4	–	7	–	0
Northern Illinois	2	–	7	–	0	3	–	8	–	0
Eastern Michigan	0	–	9	–	0	0	–	11	–	0
$ – Conference champion

The 1981 Western Michigan Broncos football team represented Western Michigan University in the Mid-American Conference (MAC) during the 1981 NCAA Division I-A football season. In their seventh and final season under head coach Elliot Uzelac, the Broncos compiled a 6–5 record (5–4 against MAC opponents), finished in a tie for fifth place in the MAC, and outscored their opponents, 206 to 170. The team played its home games at Waldo Stadium in Kalamazoo, Michigan.

The team's statistical leaders included Tom George with 1,419 passing yards, Shawn Faulkner with 701 rushing yards, and Bob Phillips with 809 receiving yards. Reggie Hinton and linebacker John Schuster were the team captains. Split end Bob Phillips received the team's most outstanding player award.

On November 24, 1981, coach Uzelac was fired as the Broncos' head football coach. Athletic director Tom Wonderling said at the time: "The program has progressed tremendously under Elliot, but I think at the present time we need a change." Wonderling was also critical of Uzelac's conservative offense, saying: "We're not like the Big Ten; we have to have something more." In seven years at Western, Uzelac compiled a 38–39 record.

== Schedule ==
Date	Opponent	Site	Result	Attendance	Source
September 12	at Kent State	Dix Stadium; Kent, OH	W 20–17		
September 19	Marshall*	Waldo Stadium; Kalamazoo, MI	W 14–3		
September 26	at Wisconsin*	Camp Randall Stadium; Madison, WI	L 10–21	67,195	
October 3	at Bowling Green	Doyt Perry Stadium; Bowling Green, OH	W 21–7	20,325	
October 10	Central Michigan	Waldo Stadium; Kalamazoo, MI (rivalry)	L 13–15		
October 17	at Miami (OH)	Miami Field; Oxford, OH	L 19–20		
October 24	Ball State	Waldo Stadium; Kalamazoo, MI	W 14–3	14,027	
October 31	at Northern Illinois	Huskie Stadium; DeKalb, IL	W 23–12		
November 7	Toledo	Waldo Stadium; Kalamazoo, MI	L 14–28	17,784	
November 14	at Ohio	Peden Stadium; Athens, OH	L 20–37		
November 21	Eastern Michigan	Waldo Stadium; Kalamazoo, MI	W 38–7		
*Non-conference game
