= 1983 Miami Redskins football team =

American college football season

1983 Miami Redskins football
- Conference: Mid-American Conference
- Record: 4–7 (3–5 MAC)
- Head coach: Tim Rose (1st season)
- Defensive coordinator: Dean Pees (1st season)
- Home stadium: Yager Stadium

1983 Mid-American Conference football standings
	Conf.					Overall
Team	W		L		T	W		L		T
Northern Illinois $	8	–	1	–	0	10	–	2	–	0
Toledo	7	–	2	–	0	9	–	2	–	0
Bowling Green	7	–	2	–	0	8	–	3	–	0
Central Michigan	7	–	2	–	0	8	–	3	–	0
Ball State	4	–	4	–	0	6	–	5	–	0
Western Michigan	4	–	5	–	0	6	–	5	–	0
Miami (OH)	3	–	5	–	0	4	–	7	–	0
Ohio	3	–	6	–	0	4	–	7	–	0
Kent State	1	–	8	–	0	1	–	10	–	0
Eastern Michigan	0	–	9	–	0	1	–	10	–	0
$ – Conference champion

The 1983 Miami Redskins football team was an American football team that represented Miami University in the Mid-American Conference (MAC) during the 1983 NCAA Division I-A football season. In its first season under head coach Tim Rose, the team compiled a 4–7 record (3–5 against MAC opponents), finished in seventh place in the MAC, and were outscored by all opponents by a combined total of 189 to 152.

The team's statistical leaders included Todd Rollins with 1,262 passing yards, Jay Peterson with 842 rushing yards, and Tom Murphy with 610 receiving yards.

== Schedule ==
Date	Opponent	Site	Result	Attendance	Source
September 10	at South Carolina*	Williams–Brice Stadium; Columbia, SC	L 3–24	63,475	
September 17	at No. 10 North Carolina*	Kenan Memorial Stadium; Chapel Hill, NC	L 17–48	49,200	
September 24	at Bowling Green	Doyt Perry Stadium; Bowling Green, OH	L 14–17	24,409	
October 1	Western Michigan	Yager Stadium; Oxford, OH	L 18–20	27,991	
October 8	Kent State	Yager Stadium; Oxford, OH	W 27–7	24,975	
October 15	at Toledo	Glass Bowl; Toledo, OH	L 9–10	25,303	
October 22	at Central Michigan	Kelly/Shorts Stadium; Mount Pleasant, MI	W 12–7	22,433	
October 29	Northern Illinois	Yager Stadium; Oxford, OH	L 0–17	27,866	
November 5	Ohio	Yager Stadium; Oxford, OH (rivalry)	L 14–17	20,954	
November 12	at Eastern Michigan	Rynearson Stadium; Ypsilanti, MI	W 24–12	7,050	
November 19	Cincinnati*	Yager Stadium; Oxford, OH (rivalry)	W 14–10	25,254	
*Non-conference game; Rankings from AP Poll released prior to the game
