= 1981 Bowling Green Falcons football team =

American college football season

1981 Bowling Green Falcons football
- Conference: Mid-American Conference
- Record: 5–5–1 (5–3–1 MAC)
- Head coach: Denny Stolz (5th season)
- Home stadium: Doyt Perry Stadium

1981 Mid-American Conference football standings
	Conf.					Overall
Team	W		L		T	W		L		T
Toledo $	8	–	1	–	0	9	–	3	–	0
Miami (OH)	6	–	1	–	1	8	–	2	–	1
Central Michigan	7	–	2	–	0	7	–	4	–	0
Bowling Green	5	–	3	–	1	5	–	5	–	1
Western Michigan	5	–	4	–	0	6	–	5	–	0
Ohio	5	–	4	–	0	5	–	6	–	0
Kent State	3	–	6	–	0	4	–	7	–	0
Ball State	2	–	6	–	0	4	–	7	–	0
Northern Illinois	2	–	7	–	0	3	–	8	–	0
Eastern Michigan	0	–	9	–	0	0	–	11	–	0
$ – Conference champion

The 1981 Bowling Green Falcons football team was an American football team that represented Bowling Green University in the Mid-American Conference (MAC) during the 1981 NCAA Division I-A football season. In their fifth season under head coach Denny Stolz, the Falcons compiled a 5–5–1 record (5–3–1 against MAC opponents), finished in fourth place in the MAC, and outscored their opponents by a combined total of 155 to 132.

The team's statistical leaders included Dayne Palsgrove with 732 passing yards, Bryant Jones with 1,051 rushing yards, and Shawn Potts with 391 receiving yards.

== Schedule ==
Date	Opponent	Site	Result	Attendance	Source
September 12	at Baylor*	Baylor Stadium; Waco, TX	L 0–38	20,000	
September 19	at Ohio	Peden Stadium; Athens, OH	L 21–23	15,924	
September 26	at Michigan State*	Spartan Stadium; East Lansing, MI	L 7–10	64,323	
October 3	Western Michigan	Doyt Perry Stadium; Bowling Green, OH	L 7–21	20,325	
October 10	Miami (OH)	Doyt Perry Stadium; Bowling Green, OH	T 7–7		
October 17	at Northern Illinois	Huskie Stadium; DeKalb, IL	W 17–10	13,558	
October 24	Toledo	Doyt Perry Stadium; Bowling Green, OH (rivalry)	W 38–0		
October 31	Kent State	Doyt Perry Stadium; Bowling Green, OH (rivalry)	W 13–7		
November 7	at Ball State	Ball State Stadium; Muncie, IN	W 14–10		
November 14	at Eastern Michigan	Rynearson Stadium; Ypsilanti, MI	W 28–0	9,559	
November 21	Central Michigan	Doyt Perry Stadium; Bowling Green, OH	L 3–6		
*Non-conference game
