= 1983 Central Michigan Chippewas football team =

American college football season

1983 Central Michigan Chippewas football
- Conference: Mid-American Conference
- Record: 8–3 (7–2 MAC)
- Head coach: Herb Deromedi (6th season)
- MVP: Chris McKay
- Home stadium: Kelly/Shorts Stadium

1983 Mid-American Conference football standings
	Conf.					Overall
Team	W		L		T	W		L		T
Northern Illinois $	8	–	1	–	0	10	–	2	–	0
Toledo	7	–	2	–	0	9	–	2	–	0
Bowling Green	7	–	2	–	0	8	–	3	–	0
Central Michigan	7	–	2	–	0	8	–	3	–	0
Ball State	4	–	4	–	0	6	–	5	–	0
Western Michigan	4	–	5	–	0	6	–	5	–	0
Miami (OH)	3	–	5	–	0	4	–	7	–	0
Ohio	3	–	6	–	0	4	–	7	–	0
Kent State	1	–	8	–	0	1	–	10	–	0
Eastern Michigan	0	–	9	–	0	1	–	10	–	0
$ – Conference champion

The 1983 Central Michigan Chippewas football team represented Central Michigan University in the Mid-American Conference (MAC) during the 1983 NCAA Division I-A football season. In their sixth season under head coach Herb Deromedi, the Chippewas compiled an 8–3 record (7–2 against MAC opponents), finished in a three-way tie for second place in the MAC standings, and outscored their opponents, 257 to 136. The team played its home games in Kelly/Shorts Stadium in Mount Pleasant, Michigan, with attendance of 115,635 in five home games.

The team's statistical leaders included quarterback Ron Fillmore with 915 passing yards, tailback Curtis Adams with 1,431 rushing yards, and split end John DeBoer with 540 receiving yards. Offensive guard Chris McKay received the team's most valuable player award. Six Central Michigan players (Adams, McKay, linebacker Kevin Egnatuk, defensive tackle Pat Brackett, defensive tackle Mike Mills, and defensive back Jim Bowman) received first-team All-MAC honors.

== Schedule ==
Date	Opponent	Site	Result	Attendance	Source
September 3	at Kentucky*	Commonwealth Stadium; Lexington, KY	L 14–31	51,232	
September 17	Northern Michigan*	Kelly/Shorts Stadium; Mount Pleasant, MI	W 37–15	21,067	
September 24	at Western Michigan	Waldo Stadium; Kalamazoo, MI (rivalry)	W 32–14	32,416	
October 1	Kent State	Kelly/Shorts Stadium; Mount Pleasant, MI	W 13–7	23,163	
October 8	Eastern Michigan	Kelly/Shorts Stadium; Mount Pleasant, MI (rivalry)	W 24–3	20,016	
October 15	at Ohio	Peden Stadium; Athens, OH	W 14–9	17,000	
October 22	Miami (OH)	Kelly/Shorts Stadium; Mount Pleasant, MI	L 7–12	22,433	
October 29	at Bowling Green	Doyt Perry Stadium; Bowling Green, OH	L 14–15	13,775	
November 5	Northern Illinois	Kelly/Shorts Stadium; Mount Pleasant, MI	W 30–14	19,274	
November 12	at Ball State	Scheumann Stadium; Muncie, IN	W 38–10	8,725	
November 19	at Toledo	Glass Bowl; Toledo, OH	W 34–6		
*Non-conference game
