= 1983 Ball State Cardinals football team =

American college football season

1983 Ball State Cardinals football
- Conference: Mid-American Conference
- Record: 6–5 (4–4 MAC)
- Head coach: Dwight Wallace (6th season)
- Home stadium: Ball State Stadium

1983 Mid-American Conference football standings
	Conf.					Overall
Team	W		L		T	W		L		T
Northern Illinois $	8	–	1	–	0	10	–	2	–	0
Toledo	7	–	2	–	0	9	–	2	–	0
Bowling Green	7	–	2	–	0	8	–	3	–	0
Central Michigan	7	–	2	–	0	8	–	3	–	0
Ball State	4	–	4	–	0	6	–	5	–	0
Western Michigan	4	–	5	–	0	6	–	5	–	0
Miami (OH)	3	–	5	–	0	4	–	7	–	0
Ohio	3	–	6	–	0	4	–	7	–	0
Kent State	1	–	8	–	0	1	–	10	–	0
Eastern Michigan	0	–	9	–	0	1	–	10	–	0
$ – Conference champion

The 1983 Ball State Cardinals football team was an American football team that represented Ball State University in the Mid-American Conference (MAC) during the 1983 NCAA Division I-A football season. In its sixth season under head coach Dwight Wallace, the team compiled a 6–5 record (4–4 against MAC opponents) and finished in fifth place out of ten teams in the conference. The team played its home games at Ball State Stadium in Muncie, Indiana.

The team's statistical leaders included Neil Britt with 2,377 passing yards, Terry Lymon with 517 rushing yards, David Naumcheff with 1,065 receiving yards, and John Diettrich with 59 points scored.

== Schedule ==
Date	Opponent	Site	Result	Attendance	Source
September 3	Rhode Island*	Ball State Stadium; Muncie, IN	W 42–26	5,695	
September 10	Wichita State*	Ball State Stadium; Muncie, IN	W 25–21	8,430	
September 17	at Ohio	Peden Stadium; Athens, OH	W 31–14	14,000	
September 24	at Toledo	Glass Bowl; Toledo, OH	L 7–43	20,624	
October 1	Northern Illinois	Ball State Stadium; Muncie, IN (rivalry)	L 14–27	15,075	
October 8	at Indiana State*	Memorial Stadium; Terre Haute, IN (Blue Key Victory Bell)	L 14–35	9,219	
October 15	at Kent State	Dix Stadium; Kent, OH	W 17–13	7,300	
October 22	at Western Michigan	Waldo Stadium; Kalamazoo, MI	W 24–20	9,650	
October 29	Eastern Michigan	Ball State Stadium; Muncie, IN	W 33–20		
November 5	at Bowling Green	Doyt Perry Stadium; Bowling Green, OH	L 30–45	17,210	
November 12	Central Michigan	Ball State Stadium; Muncie, IN	L 10–38	8,725	
*Non-conference game
