= 1981 Northern Illinois Huskies football team =

American college football season

1981 Northern Illinois Huskies football
- Conference: Mid-American Conference
- Record: 3–8 (2–7 MAC)
- Head coach: Bill Mallory (2nd season)
- Defensive coordinator: Joe Novak (2nd season)
- MVP: Larry Alleyne
- Captains: Mike Chelovich; John Gibbons; Pat O'Shea
- Home stadium: Huskie Stadium

1981 Mid-American Conference football standings
	Conf.					Overall
Team	W		L		T	W		L		T
Toledo $	8	–	1	–	0	9	–	3	–	0
Miami (OH)	6	–	1	–	1	8	–	2	–	1
Central Michigan	7	–	2	–	0	7	–	4	–	0
Bowling Green	5	–	3	–	1	5	–	5	–	1
Western Michigan	5	–	4	–	0	6	–	5	–	0
Ohio	5	–	4	–	0	5	–	6	–	0
Kent State	3	–	6	–	0	4	–	7	–	0
Ball State	2	–	6	–	0	4	–	7	–	0
Northern Illinois	2	–	7	–	0	3	–	8	–	0
Eastern Michigan	0	–	9	–	0	0	–	11	–	0
$ – Conference champion

The 1981 Northern Illinois Huskies football team represented Northern Illinois University as a member of the Mid-American Conference (MAC) during 1981 NCAA Division I-A football season. Led by second-year head coach Bill Mallory, the Huskies compiled an overall record of 3–8 with a mark of 2–7 in conference play, placing ninth in the MAC. Northern Illinois played home games at Huskie Stadium in DeKalb, Illinois.

== Schedule ==
Date	Opponent	Site	Result	Attendance	Source
September 12	Long Beach State*	Huskie Stadium; DeKalb, IL	L 7–17	21,819	
September 19	at Central Michigan	Perry Shorts Stadium; Mount Pleasant, MI	L 10–17		
September 26	Illinois State*	Huskie Stadium; DeKalb, IL	W 40–7	15,387	
October 3	at Ball State	Ball State Stadium; Muncie, IN (rivalry)	L 0–23	16,879	
October 10	Kent State	Huskie Stadium; DeKalb, IL	L 10–31	21,053	
October 17	Bowling Green	Huskie Stadium; DeKalb, IL	L 10–17	13,558	
October 24	at Eastern Michigan	Rynearson Stadium; Ypsilanti, MI	W 30–7		
October 31	Western Michigan	Huskie Stadium; DeKalb, IL	L 12–23		
November 7	Ohio	Huskie Stadium; DeKalb, IL	W 38–14		
November 14	at Miami (OH)	Miami Field; Oxford, OH	L 3–30		
November 21	Toledo	Huskie Stadium; DeKalb, IL	L 0–31		
*Non-conference game
