= 1981 Miami Redskins football team =

American college football season

1981 Miami Redskins football
- Conference: Mid-American Conference
- Record: 8–2–1 (6–1–1 MAC)
- Head coach: Tom Reed (4th season)
- Defensive coordinator: Tim Rose (4th season)
- Home stadium: Miami Field

1981 Mid-American Conference football standings
	Conf.					Overall
Team	W		L		T	W		L		T
Toledo $	8	–	1	–	0	9	–	3	–	0
Miami (OH)	6	–	1	–	1	8	–	2	–	1
Central Michigan	7	–	2	–	0	7	–	4	–	0
Bowling Green	5	–	3	–	1	5	–	5	–	1
Western Michigan	5	–	4	–	0	6	–	5	–	0
Ohio	5	–	4	–	0	5	–	6	–	0
Kent State	3	–	6	–	0	4	–	7	–	0
Ball State	2	–	6	–	0	4	–	7	–	0
Northern Illinois	2	–	7	–	0	3	–	8	–	0
Eastern Michigan	0	–	9	–	0	0	–	11	–	0
$ – Conference champion

The 1981 Miami Redskins football team was an American football team that represented Miami University in the Mid-American Conference (MAC) during the 1981 NCAA Division I-A football season. In its fourth season under head coach Tom Reed, the team compiled an 8–2–1 record (6–1–1 against MAC opponents), finished in second place in the MAC, and outscored all opponents by a combined total of 199 to 154.

The team's statistical leaders included John Appold with 929 passing yards, Greg Jones with 1,134 rushing yards, and Don Treadwell with 391 receiving yards.

== Schedule ==
Date	Opponent	Site	Result	Attendance	Source
September 12	at William & Mary*	Cary Field; Williamsburg, VA	W 33–14	12,800	
September 19	at No. 10 North Carolina*	Kenan Memorial Stadium; Chapel Hill, NC	L 7–49	49,500	
September 26	at Eastern Michigan	Rynearson Stadium; Ypsilanti, MI	W 18–12		
October 3	Kent State	Miami Field; Oxford, OH	W 20–13	20,080	
October 10	at Bowling Green	Doyt Perry Stadium; Bowling Green, OH	T 7–7		
October 17	Western Michigan	Miami Field; Oxford, OH	W 20–19		
October 24	Ohio^{†}	Miami Field; Oxford, OH (rivalry)	W 40–14	17,583	
October 31	at Toledo	Glass Bowl; Toledo, OH	L 10–17		
November 7	at Central Michigan	Perry Shorts Stadium; Mount Pleasant, MI	W 7–3	20,714	
November 14	Northern Illinois	Miami Field; Oxford, OH	W 30–3		
November 21	Cincinnati*	Miami Field; Oxford, OH (rivalry)	W 7–3	13,457	
*Non-conference game; ^{†}Homecoming; Rankings from AP Poll released prior to the game
