= Ed Chlebek =

American gridiron football player and coach (born 1940)

Biographical details
- Born: February 9, 1940 (age 86); Uniontown, Pennsylvania, U.S.

Playing career
- 1959–1961: Western Michigan
- 1962: Grand Rapids Blazers
- 1963: New York Jets
- 1964: Grand Rapids Blazers
- 1965: Fort Wayne Warriors
- 1966: Richmond Rebels
- 1967–1969: Wheeling / Ohio Valley Ironmen
- 1970: Jersey Tigers
- Position: Quarterback

Coaching career (HC unless noted)
- 1974: Detroit Wheels (assistant)
- 1974–1975: Notre Dame (assistant)
- 1976–1977: Eastern Michigan
- 1978–1980: Boston College
- 1981–1982: Kent State
- 1983: Toronto Argonauts (OC)
- 1984: Oklahoma Outlaws (OC)

Head coaching record
- Overall: 26–51

Accomplishments and honors

Awards
- MAC Coach of the Year (1977)

Edward S. Chlebek (born February 9, 1940) is an American former gridiron football player and coach. He served as the head coach at Eastern Michigan University (1976–1977), Boston College (1978–1980), and Kent State University (1981–1982), compiling a career college football record of 26–51.

== Playing career ==
Chlebek played college football as a quarterback at Western Michigan University from 1959 to 1961. He passed for 2,290 yards in his career with the Western Michigan Broncos, including 1,109 as a senior in 1961. In 1963, Chlebek played for the New York Jets of the American Football League (AFL). He was inducted into Western Michigan University Athletic Hall of Fame.

== Coaching career ==
Chlebek came to Eastern Michigan from the University of Notre Dame, where he was an assistant under Dan Devine and coached future Pro Football Hall of Fame quarterback Joe Montana. At Eastern Michigan, he compiled a 10–12 record from 1976 to 1977. At Boston College, he tallied a 12–21 mark and coached the only winless season in the program's history, a 0–11 campaign in 1978. From 1981 to 1982, he coached Kent State to a 4–18 record. He ended his college career on a 12-game losing streak. From Kent State he went to the Toronto Argonauts of the Canadian Football League as the offensive coordinator in 1983. The Argonauts won the Grey Cup in 1983.

== Head coaching record ==
Year	Team	Overall	Conference	Standing	Bowl/playoffs
Eastern Michigan Hurons (Mid-American Conference) (1976–1977)
1976	Eastern Michigan	2–9	1–5	9th	
1977	Eastern Michigan	8–3	4–3	T–4th	
Eastern Michigan:		10–12	5–8		
Boston College Eagles (NCAA Division I-A independent) (1978–1980)
1978	Boston College	0–11			
1979	Boston College	5–6			
1980	Boston College	7–4			
Boston College:		12–21			
Kent State Golden Flashes (Mid-American Conference) (1981–1982)
1981	Kent State	4–7	3–6	7th	
1982	Kent State	0–11	0–9	10th	
Kent State:		4–18	3–15		
Total:		26–51			
