= 1983 Bowling Green Falcons football team =

American college football season

1983 Bowling Green Falcons football
- Conference: Mid-American Conference
- Record: 8–3 (7–2 MAC)
- Head coach: Denny Stolz (7th season)
- Home stadium: Doyt Perry Stadium

1983 Mid-American Conference football standings
	Conf.					Overall
Team	W		L		T	W		L		T
Northern Illinois $	8	–	1	–	0	10	–	2	–	0
Toledo	7	–	2	–	0	9	–	2	–	0
Bowling Green	7	–	2	–	0	8	–	3	–	0
Central Michigan	7	–	2	–	0	8	–	3	–	0
Ball State	4	–	4	–	0	6	–	5	–	0
Western Michigan	4	–	5	–	0	6	–	5	–	0
Miami (OH)	3	–	5	–	0	4	–	7	–	0
Ohio	3	–	6	–	0	4	–	7	–	0
Kent State	1	–	8	–	0	1	–	10	–	0
Eastern Michigan	0	–	9	–	0	1	–	10	–	0
$ – Conference champion

The 1983 Bowling Green Falcons football team was an American football team that represented Bowling Green University in the Mid-American Conference (MAC) during the 1983 NCAA Division I-A football season. In their seventh season under head coach Denny Stolz, the Falcons compiled an 8–3 record (7–2 against MAC opponents), finished in a tie for second place in the MAC, and outscored their opponents by a combined total of 277 to 242.

The team's statistical leaders included Brian McClure with 3,264 passing yards, Darryl Story with 724 rushing yards, and Stan Hunter with 1,107 receiving yards.

== Schedule ==
Date	Opponent	Site	Result	Attendance	Source
September 10	at Fresno State*	Bulldog Stadium; Fresno, CA	W 35–27	30,000	
September 17	at BYU*	Cougar Stadium; Provo, UT	L 28–63	64,659	
September 24	Miami (OH)	Doyt Perry Stadium; Bowling Green, OH	W 17–14	24,409	
October 1	at Eastern Michigan	Rynearson Stadium; Ypsilanti, MI	W 26–21	11,593	
October 8	Toledo	Doyt Perry Stadium; Bowling Green, OH (rivalry)	L 3–6	33,527	
October 15	at Western Michigan	Waldo Stadium; Kalamazoo, MI	W 23–20	19,885	
October 22	at Northern Illinois	Huskie Stadium; DeKalb, IL	L 23–24	18,500	
October 29	Central Michigan	Doyt Perry Stadium; Bowling Green, OH	W 15–14	13,775	
November 5	Ball State	Doyt Perry Stadium; Bowling Green, OH	W 45–30	17,210	
November 12	at Ohio	Peden Stadium; Athens, OH	W 24–20		
November 19	Kent State	Doyt Perry Stadium; Bowling Green, OH (rivalry)	W 38–3	11,100	
*Non-conference game
