= Dwight Wallace =

American football player, coach, and college athletics administrator (born 1943)

Biographical details
- Born: December 26, 1943 (age 82); Wilmington, Ohio, U.S.

Playing career
- 1964–1965: Bowling Green
- Position: Quarterback

Coaching career (HC unless noted)
- 1966: Bowling Green (GA)
- 1967–1969: Iowa Wesleyan (OC)
- 1970: Central Michigan (assistant/fr. HC)
- 1971–1973: Ball State (OC)
- 1974–1977: Colorado (PCG/RC)
- 1978–1984: Ball State
- 1985–1989: West Virginia (QB)

Administrative career (AD unless noted)
- 1981–1984: Ball State

Head coaching record
- Overall: 40–37

Accomplishments and honors

Championships
- 1 MAC (1978)

Awards
- MAC Coach of the Year (1978)

Dwight Wallace (born December 26, 1943) is an American former football player, coach, and college athletics administrator. He served as the head football coach at the Ball State University from 1978 to 1984, compiling a record of 40–37.

== Head coaching record ==
Year	Team	Overall	Conference	Standing	Bowl/playoffs
Ball State Cardinals (Mid-American Conference) (1978–1994)
1978	Ball State	10–1	8–0	1st	
1979	Ball State	6–5	4–4	T–4th	
1980	Ball State	6–5	5–4	T–5th	
1981	Ball State	4–7	2–6	8th	
1982	Ball State	5–6	4–4	8th	
1983	Ball State	6–5	4–4	5th	
1984	Ball State	3–8	3–5	T–6th	
Ball State:		40–37	30–27		
Total:		40–37			
National championship Conference title Conference division title or championship game berth
