= Dick Scesniak =

American football player and coach (1940–1986)

Biographical details
- Born: June 28, 1940
- Died: April 1, 1986 (aged 45); Kent, Ohio, U.S.

Playing career
- 1959–1961: Iowa State
- Position: Linebacker

Coaching career (HC unless noted)
- c. 1963: Missouri (GA)
- 1965–1967: Iowa State (OL)
- 1968–1970: Utah (OL)
- 1971–1974: Kent State (OC)
- 1975–1978: Washington (OC)
- 1979: New York Giants (OL)
- 1982: Wisconsin (OL)
- 1983–1985: Kent State

Head coaching record
- Overall: 8–25

Richard Paul Scesniak (June 28, 1940 – April 1, 1986) was an American college football coach. He served as the head football coach at Kent State University from 1983 to 1985, compiling a record of 8–25. Scesniak died of an apparent heart attack on April 1, 1986, after he collapsed while exercising at Dix Stadium in Kent, Ohio.

== Head coaching record ==
Year	Team	Overall	Conference	Standing	Bowl/playoffs
Kent State Golden Flashes (Mid-American Conference) (1983–1985)
1983	Kent State	1–10	1–8	9th	
1984	Kent State	4–7	3–6	T–8th	
1985	Kent State	3–8	2–6	9th	
Kent State:		8–25	6–20		
Total:		8–25			
