= 1983 Ohio Bobcats football team =

American college football season

1983 Ohio Bobcats football
- Conference: Mid-American Conference
- Record: 4–7 (3–6 MAC)
- Head coach: Brian Burke (5th season)
- Home stadium: Peden Stadium

1983 Mid-American Conference football standings
	Conf.					Overall
Team	W		L		T	W		L		T
Northern Illinois $	8	–	1	–	0	10	–	2	–	0
Toledo	7	–	2	–	0	9	–	2	–	0
Bowling Green	7	–	2	–	0	8	–	3	–	0
Central Michigan	7	–	2	–	0	8	–	3	–	0
Ball State	4	–	4	–	0	6	–	5	–	0
Western Michigan	4	–	5	–	0	6	–	5	–	0
Miami (OH)	3	–	5	–	0	4	–	7	–	0
Ohio	3	–	6	–	0	4	–	7	–	0
Kent State	1	–	8	–	0	1	–	10	–	0
Eastern Michigan	0	–	9	–	0	1	–	10	–	0
$ – Conference champion

The 1983 Ohio Bobcats football team was an American football team that represented Ohio University in the Mid-American Conference (MAC) during the 1983 NCAA Division I-A football season. In their fifth season under head coach Brian Burke, the Bobcats compiled a 4–7 record (3–6 against MAC opponents), finished in eighth place, and were outscored by all opponents by a combined total of 270 to 163. They played their home games in Peden Stadium in Athens, Ohio.

== Schedule ==
Date	Opponent	Site	Result	Attendance	Source
September 3	at West Virginia*	Mountaineer Field; Morgantown, WV	L 3–55	54,612	
September 10	at Richmond*	City Stadium; Richmond, VA	W 17–10	5,500	
September 17	Ball State	Peden Stadium; Athens, OH	L 14–31	14,000	
September 24	Eastern Michigan	Peden Stadium; Athens, OH	W 31–14		
October 1	at Toledo	Glass Bowl; Toledo, OH	L 0–31		
October 15	Central Michigan	Peden Stadium; Athens, OH	L 9–14	17,000	
October 22	at Kent State	Dix Stadium; Kent, OH	W 21–20	4,000	
October 29	Western Michigan	Peden Stadium; Athens, OH	L 14–16	10,500	
November 5	at Miami (OH)	Miami Field; Oxford, OH (rivalry)	W 17–14	20,954	
November 12	Bowling Green	Peden Stadium; Athens, OH	L 20–24		
November 19	at Northern Illinois	Huskie Stadium; DeKalb, IL	L 17–41	21,500	
*Non-conference game
