= 1983 Eastern Michigan Hurons football team =

American college football season

1983 Eastern Michigan Hurons football
- Conference: Mid-American Conference
- Record: 1–10 (0–9 MAC)
- Head coach: Jim Harkema (1st season)
- Captain: Game captains
- Home stadium: Rynearson Stadium

1983 Mid-American Conference football standings
	Conf.					Overall
Team	W		L		T	W		L		T
Northern Illinois $	8	–	1	–	0	10	–	2	–	0
Toledo	7	–	2	–	0	9	–	2	–	0
Bowling Green	7	–	2	–	0	8	–	3	–	0
Central Michigan	7	–	2	–	0	8	–	3	–	0
Ball State	4	–	4	–	0	6	–	5	–	0
Western Michigan	4	–	5	–	0	6	–	5	–	0
Miami (OH)	3	–	5	–	0	4	–	7	–	0
Ohio	3	–	6	–	0	4	–	7	–	0
Kent State	1	–	8	–	0	1	–	10	–	0
Eastern Michigan	0	–	9	–	0	1	–	10	–	0
$ – Conference champion

The 1983 Eastern Michigan Hurons football team represented Eastern Michigan University in the 1983 NCAA Division I-A football season. In their first season under head coach Jim Harkema, the Hurons compiled a 1–10 record (0–9 against conference opponents), finished in last place in the Mid-American Conference, and were outscored by their opponents, 276 to 134. The team's statistical leaders included Steve Coulter with 1,827 passing yards, Ricky Calhoun with 871 rushing yards, and Derrin Powell with 582 receiving yards.

== Schedule ==
Date	Opponent	Site	Result	Attendance	Source
September 3	Marshall*	Rynearson Stadium; Ypsilanti, MI	W 7–3		
September 10	Akron*	Rynearson Stadium; Ypsilanti, MI	L 0–13	5,173	
September 24	at Ohio	Peden Stadium; Athens, OH	L 14–31		
October 1	Bowling Green	Rynearson Stadium; Ypsilanti, MI	L 21–26	11,593	
October 8	at Central Michigan	Kelly/Shorts Stadium; Mount Pleasant, MI (rivalry)	L 3–24	20,016	
October 15	Northern Illinois^{†}	Rynearson Stadium; Ypsilanti, MI	L 15–34	8,010	
October 22	Toledo	Rynearson Stadium; Ypsilanti, MI	L 19–37		
October 29	at Ball State	Ball State Stadium; Muncie, IN	L 20–33		
November 5	at Kent State	Dix Stadium; Kent, OH	L 13–37		
November 12	Miami (OH)	Rynearson Stadium; Ypsilanti, MI	L 12–24	7,050	
November 19	at Western Michigan	Waldo Stadium; Kalamazoo, MI	L 10–14	3,593	
*Non-conference game; ^{†}Homecoming
