= Chuck Stobart =

American football player and coach (1932–2022)

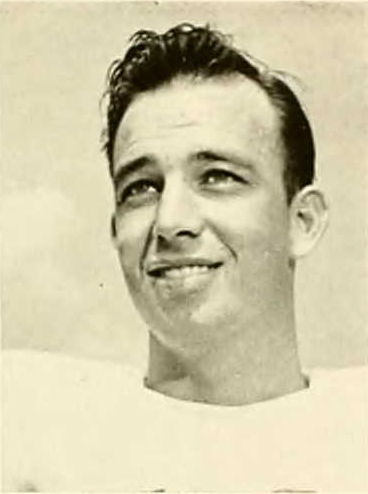
- Stobart at Ohio University, 1958

Biographical details
- Born: October 27, 1932; Ohio, U.S.
- Died: November 29, 2022 (aged 90); Tucson, Arizona, U.S.

Playing career
- 1956–1958: Ohio
- Position: Quarterback

Coaching career (HC unless noted)
- 1965: Marshall (backfield)
- 1966: Cincinnati (backfield)
- 1967–1968: Miami (OH) (assistant)
- 1969–1976: Michigan (backfield)
- 1977–1981: Toledo
- 1982–1984: Utah
- 1985: Pittsburgh (OC)
- 1986: Arizona (OC)
- 1987–1988: USC (OC)
- 1989–1994: Memphis
- 1995–1999: Ohio State (WR)
- 2000: Ohio State (OC)

Head coaching record
- Overall: 70–83–3
- Bowls: 1–0

Accomplishments and honors

Championships
- 1 MAC (1981)

Awards
- 2× MAC Coach of the Year (1979, 1981)

Charles R. Stobart (October 27, 1932 – November 29, 2022) was an American college football player and coach. He played as a quarterback at Ohio University in the 1950s. He was a football coach at various schools for 42 years from 1959 to 2000, including 36 consecutive seasons as a coach at Division I collegiate programs.

Stobart began his coaching career in 1959 as a high school coach in Ohio. His college coaching positions included stints as the head football coach at the University of Toledo (1977–1981), the University of Utah (1982–1984), and the University of Memphis (1989–1994). He was twice selected as the Mid-American Conference Coach of the Year (1979 and 1981) and was inducted into the University of Toledo Athletics Hall of Fame.

Stobart also served as offensive backfield coach at the University of Michigan (1969–1976) during The Ten Year War and offensive coordinator at the University of Pittsburgh (1985), University of Arizona (1986), University of Southern California (1987–1988), and Ohio State University (2000).

== Early years ==
Stobart grew up in Middleport, Ohio. Stobart became a star athlete at Middleport High School, playing football, basketball, and baseball. After high school, Stobart served in the U.S. Coast Guard. He then attended Ohio University where he played football and basketball. He was the quarterback for the Ohio Bobcats football team from 1956 to 1958 and was played at third base for the baseball team.

== Coaching career ==
=== High school coach ===
Stobart started his coaching career in the fall of 1959 as the head football coach at Berne Union High School in Sugar Grove, Ohio. He led Berne Union to a conference championship and an 8–1 record during the 1959 season. In 1960, he was hired as head football coach at Gallia Academy in Gallipolis, Ohio. He led Gallia to a perfect 9–0 record in 1960. In 1961, he was hired as the head football coach at Mount Vernon High School in Mount Vernon, Ohio. He remained at Mount Vernon through the 1964 season. His teams compiled a 17–1 record during the 1963 and 1964 seasons.

=== Marshall and Cincinnati ===
In June 1965, Stobart was hired by Marshall University as offensive backfield coach for the football team and head coach for the baseball team. The 1965 Marshall Thundering Herd football team compiled a 5–5 record.

In January 1966, Stobart was hired as backfield coach at the University of Cincinnati. The 1966 Cincinnati Bearcats football team compiled a 3–7 record.

=== Schembechler years (Miami and Michigan) ===
In February 1967, Stobart was hired as an assistant coach on Bo Schembechler's staff at Miami University. He served as Schembechler's offensive backfield coach during the 1967 and 1968 seasons, when the team compiled records of 6–4 and 7–3.

In December 1968, Schembechler was hired as the head coach at the University of Michigan. In January 1969, Schembechler hired Stobart to join him as offensive backfield coach at Michigan. He spent the next seven years from 1969 to 1976 as Michigan's backfield coach, working with Schembechler and mentoring Michigan backs including Dennis Brown, Don Moorhead, Billy Taylor, Dennis Franklin, Gordon Bell, Rick Leach, and Rob Lytle.

Stobart spent a decade on Schembechler's staff at Miami and Michigan. Throughout his career, Stobart said Schembechler was the biggest football influence in his life.

=== Toledo ===
In December 1976, Stobart was hired as head football coach at the University of Toledo. At the time of the hiring, Schembechler said:

I don't know how Toledo could have hired a better man. . . . He is a tremendous football man. He knows football, but more than that he is an idea man. He is an excellent recruiter and a really tireless worker. The guy can go all day. I am really sorry to see him go.

Stobart was head coach at Toledo for five years from 1977 to 1981, compiling a 23–30–1 record. His 1981 Toledo Rockets football team went 9–3, won the Mid-American Conference (MAC) championship, and defeated San Jose State in the 1981 California Bowl. He out-polled Mike Kelly and Earle Bruce to win Ohio Coach of the Year honors in December 1981. He was inducted into the University of Toledo Sports Hall of Fame in 2012.

=== Utah ===
In December 1981, he was hired as the head coach at the University of Utah. He held that position for three years from 1982 to 1984, compiling a 16–17–1 record. In November 1984, Utah announced it was seeking a new football coach and advised that Stobart was free to pursue other options.

=== Pittsburgh, Arizona and USC ===
In January 1985, the University of Pittsburgh hired Stobart as its offensive coordinator. At the end of the 1985 season, Pitt's head coach Foge Fazio was fired.

Stobart was hired in January 1986 as the offensive coordinator at the University of Arizona.

In January 1987, Arizona head coach Larry Smith was hired as the head football coach at USC. Smith promptly hired Stobart as associate head coach and offensive coordinator at USC. Stobart held that position for two years, helping USC to an 8–4 record and 26.8 points per game in 1987 and a 10–2 record and 30.8 points per game in 1988.

=== Memphis ===
In June 1989, Stobart was hired as the head football coach at the University of Memphis. At the time, the program was embroiled in controversy due to NCAA rules violation and waiting for an NCAA decision on sanctions. Larry Smith of USC praised the selection of Stobart, saying, "He brings integrity, responsibility and maturity, plus a tremendous knowledge of the game and coaching skills."

Stobart compiled a 29–36–1 record in six years at Memphis. He was fired from his post at Memphis in December 1994.

=== Ohio State ===
In March 1995, Stobart was hired as the wide receivers coach at the Ohio State University. He held that post for five seasons from 1995 to 1999. He was position coach to Biletnikoff Award winner Terry Glenn in 1995. In 2000, he was promoted to offensive coordinator at Ohio State. In Stobart's lone season as Ohio State's offensive coordinator, the Buckeyes compiled an 8–4 record and scored an average of 27.6 points per game. In January 2001, Ohio State head coach John Cooper was fired. Ohio State's new head coach Jim Tressel then hired Jim Bollman to replace Stobart as the team's offensive coordinator.

== Family and later years ==
Stobart and his wife Diana had five children. In retirement, he lived in Phoenix, Arizona. Stobart died on November 29, 2022, at age 90 in Tucson, Arizona.

== Head coaching record ==
Year	Team	Overall	Conference	Standing	Bowl/playoffs
Toledo Rockets (Mid-American Conference) (1977–1981)
1977	Toledo	2–9	2–7	9th	
1978	Toledo	2–9	2–7	9th	
1979	Toledo	8–2–1	7–1–1	2nd	
1980	Toledo	4–7	3–6	T–8th	
1981	Toledo	9–3	8–1	1st	W California
Toledo:		25–30–1	22–22–1		
Utah Utes (Western Athletic Conference) (1982–1984)
1982	Utah	5–6	2–4	7th	
1983	Utah	5–6	4–4	T–5th	
1984	Utah	6–5–1	4–3–1	T–4th	
Utah:		16–17–1	10–11–1		
Memphis / Memphis State Tigers (NCAA Division I-A independent) (1989–1994)
1989	Memphis State	2–9			
1990	Memphis State	4–6–1			
1991	Memphis State	5–6			
1992	Memphis State	6–5			
1993	Memphis State	6–5			
1994	Memphis	6–5			
Memphis State / Memphis:		29–36–1			
Total:		70–83–3			
National championship Conference title Conference division title or championship game berth
