= Brian Burke (American football) =

American football player and coach (1935–2025)

Biographical details
- Born: August 22, 1935; Cleveland, Ohio, U.S.
- Died: September 20, 2025 (aged 90); Roscommon, Michigan, U.S.

Playing career
- 1955–1957: Kent State
- Position: Quarterback

Coaching career (HC unless noted)
- 1958–1960: Shaw HS (OH) (assistant)
- 1961–1963: Geneva HS (OH)
- 1964–1968: Parma HS (OH)
- 1971: William & Mary (assistant)
- 1972–1976: NC State (OC)
- 1977–1978: Virginia (OC)
- 1979–1984: Ohio
- 1985–1989: Lakewood HS (OH)

Head coaching record
- Overall: 31–34–1 (college); 70–59–1 (high school)

Brian Gilbert Burke (August 22, 1935 – September 20, 2025) was an American football player and coach. He served as the head football coach at Ohio University from 1979 to 1984, compiling a record of 31–34–1. He played college football at Kent State University from 1955 to 1957. Prior to being named head coach at Ohio, Burke was an assistant coach at the College of William & Mary, North Carolina State University, and the University of Virginia.

Burke was the head football coach at Geneva High School in Geneva, Ohio from 1961 to 1963 and Parma High School in Parma, Ohio from 1964 to 1968, leading his teams at the two high schools to a combined record of 44–35–1 in eight seasons. His 1963 Geneva team won the Northeastern Conference title. Burke left coaching in 1969 to take a job in finance with Paine, Webber, Jackson & Curtis—later known as Paine Webber. He returned to football two years later, in 1971, as an assistant coach at William & Mary under Lou Holtz. Burke was the head football coach at Lakewood High School in Lakewood, Ohio from 1985 to 1989, tallying a mark of 26–24 in five seasons. He also taught physical education at Lakewood.

Burke died on September 20, 2025, in Roscommon, Michigan, after suffering from Alzheimer's disease for 15 years.

== Head coaching record ==
=== College ===
Year	Team	Overall	Conference	Standing	Bowl/playoffs
Ohio Bobcats (Mid-American Conference) (1979–1984)
1979	Ohio	6–5	4–4	T–4th	
1980	Ohio	6–5	5–4	T–5th	
1981	Ohio	5–6	5–4	T–5th	
1982	Ohio	6–5	5–4	T–5th	
1983	Ohio	4–7	3–6	8th	
1984	Ohio	4–6–1	4–4–1	4th	
Ohio:		31–34–1	26–26–1		
Total:		31–34–1			
