= 1981 California Bowl =

- 1st California Bowl
Toledo Rockets	San Jose State Spartans
(8–3)	(9–2)
27	25
Head coach: Chuck Stobart	Head coach: Jack Elway
	AP / Coaches; NR / 20
	1	2	3	4	Total
Toledo	7	7	7	6	27
San Jose State	0	3	8	14	25
- Date: December 19, 1981
- Season: 1981
- Stadium: Bulldog Stadium
- Location: Fresno, California
- Attendance: 15,565

United States TV coverage
- Network: Mizlou

The 1981 California Bowl was an American college football bowl game played on December 19, 1981, at Bulldog Stadium in Fresno, California. The game pitted the Toledo Rockets and the San Jose State Spartans.

== Background ==
Toledo went 8–1 in conference play, with only a loss to Bowling Green State on the road being the blemish, though the Rockets finished as champions of the Mid-American Conference for the first time since 1971, which was the last time they had qualified for a bowl game. They were attempting to break their school record for most total offense (4,021), with the Rockets having 3,968 prior to the game. As for San Jose State, they went a perfect 5–0 in the Pacific Coast Athletic Association to finish as champions for the first time since 1978. This was their first bowl game since the Pasadena Bowl in 1971, with the two previous bowl games being at Ratcliffe Stadium, near where Bulldog Stadium was located.

== Game summary ==
The Rockets had the ball at their 20 with less than a minute to go. They drove 56 yards with two passes from quarterback Maurice Hall to set up a 41-yard field goal attempt for Tony Lee, whose longest field goal was 40 yards, with one missed kick from that distance already in the game. With 15 seconds to play, Lee's kick was good, and the Rockets pulled ahead to win the inaugural California Bowl.

San Jose State had 29 first downs to Toledo's 21, while the Rockets had 221 rushing yards to the 54 yards the Spartans had. As for passing, the Spartans had 467, while the Rockets had 265. Toledo outgained San Jose in return yards 133 to 102. Toledo turned the ball over three times, while San Jose turned it over six times. San Jose had 10 penalties for 85 yards while Toledo had 3 penalties for 25 yards. Possession time favored the Rockets, by 16 seconds. For Toledo, Maurice Hall went 11-of-21 for 265 yards and one touchdown, with one interception. Arnold Smiley rushed for 144 yards on 29 carries, while Rodney Achter caught 4 passes for 102 yards. For San Jose State, Steve Clarkson went 43-of-62 for 467 yards (both school records) for three touchdowns and five interceptions. Gerald Willhite caught 18 passes for 124 yards.

=== Scoring summary ===
- Toledo - Rodney Achter 45-yard touchdown run (Tony Lee kick)
- San Jose State - 25-yard field goal by Mike Berg
- Toledo - Arnold Smiley 7-yard touchdown run (Lee kick)
- Toledo - Steve Schafer 12-yard touchdown pass from Maurice Hall (Lee kick)
- San Jose State - Mervyn Fernandez 12-yard touchdown pass from Steve Clarkson (Fernandez pass from Clarkson)
- Toledo - 27-yard field goal by Lee
- San Jose State - Fernandez 22-yard touchdown pass from Clarkson (kick failed)
- San Jose State - Fernandez 35-yard touchdown pass from Clarkson (Taylor pass from Gerald Willhite)
- Toledo - 41-yard field goal by Lee

== Aftermath ==
This was Stobart's last game with Toledo, as he left for Utah after the game. The Rockets went to the California Bowl three years later, losing to UNLV, though the game was later forfeited when it was found that UNLV used ineligible players. The Rockets did not return to nor win a bowl game until 1995. San Jose State returned to the bowl in 1986, which they won.
