= 1983 Toledo Rockets football team =

American college football season

1983 Toledo Rockets football
- Conference: Mid-American Conference
- Record: 9–2 (7–2 MAC)
- Head coach: Dan Simrell (2nd season)
- Home stadium: Glass Bowl

1983 Mid-American Conference football standings
	Conf.					Overall
Team	W		L		T	W		L		T
Northern Illinois $	8	–	1	–	0	10	–	2	–	0
Toledo	7	–	2	–	0	9	–	2	–	0
Bowling Green	7	–	2	–	0	8	–	3	–	0
Central Michigan	7	–	2	–	0	8	–	3	–	0
Ball State	4	–	4	–	0	6	–	5	–	0
Western Michigan	4	–	5	–	0	6	–	5	–	0
Miami (OH)	3	–	5	–	0	4	–	7	–	0
Ohio	3	–	6	–	0	4	–	7	–	0
Kent State	1	–	8	–	0	1	–	10	–	0
Eastern Michigan	0	–	9	–	0	1	–	10	–	0
$ – Conference champion

The 1983 Toledo Rockets football team was an American football team that represented the University of Toledo in the Mid-American Conference (MAC) during the 1983 NCAA Division I-A football season. In their second season under head coach Dan Simrell, the Rockets compiled a 9–2 record (7–2 against MAC opponents), finished in second place in the MAC, and outscored all opponents by a combined total of 276 to 157.

The team's statistical leaders included Jim Kelso with 1,346 passing yards, Steve Morgan with 630 rushing yards, and Capus Robinson with 499 receiving yards.

== Schedule ==
Date	Opponent	Site	Result	Attendance	Source
September 10	UMass*	Glass Bowl; Toledo, OH	W 45–13	20,061	
September 17	at Richmond*	University of Richmond Stadium; Richmond, VA	W 31–6	5,500	
September 24	Ball State	Glass Bowl; Toledo, OH	W 43–7	20,624	
October 1	Ohio	Glass Bowl; Toledo, OH	W 31–0		
October 8	at Bowling Green	Doyt Perry Stadium; Bowling Green, OH (rivalry)	W 6–3	33,527	
October 15	Miami (OH)	Glass Bowl; Toledo, OH	W 10–9	25,303	
October 22	at Eastern Michigan	Rynearson Stadium; Ypsilanti, MI	W 37–19		
October 29	Kent State	Glass Bowl; Toledo, OH	W 37–34	19,473	
November 5	at Western Michigan	Waldo Stadium; Kalamazoo, MI	W 20–16		
November 12	at Northern Illinois	Huskie Stadium; DeKalb, IL	L 10–26	27,700	
November 19	Central Michigan	Glass Bowl; Toledo, OH	L 8–34		
*Non-conference game

== After the season ==
=== NFL draft ===
The following Rocket was selected in the 1984 NFL draft following the season.

Round	Pick	Player	Position	NFL club
9	252	Mike Russell	Linebacker	Houston Oilers
