= Elliot Uzelac =

American football coach

Biographical details
- Born: July 21, 1941 (age 85); Gary, Indiana

Playing career
- 1961–1963: Western Michigan

Coaching career (HC unless noted)
- 1964: Chesterton HS (IN) (assistant)
- 1965: Bowling Green (GA)
- 1966–1967: Logan HS (WV)
- 1968–1969: Bowling Green (OL)
- 1970: Bowling Green (OC)
- 1971–1972: Navy (OL)
- 1973–1974: Michigan (OL)
- 1975–1981: Western Michigan
- 1982–1986: Michigan (OL)
- 1987–1989: Navy
- 1990: Indiana (assistant)
- 1991: Ohio State (OC)
- 1992: Cleveland Browns (assistant)
- 1993–1994: Colorado (OC)
- 1995–1996: Kentucky (OC)
- 1997: Minnesota (OC/OL)
- 1998–2000: Maryland (OL)
- 2002–2003: St. John's College HS (DC)
- 2004–2005: Georgetown (OC)
- 2006–2010: St. Joseph HS (MI)
- 2015–2017: Benton Harbor HS (MI)
- 2020–2022: Berrien Springs HS (MI)

Head coaching record
- Overall: 46–64 (college)

Accomplishments and honors

Awards
- MAC Coach of the Year (1976)

Elliot Uzelac (born July 24, 1941) is an American football coach. He served as the head football coach at Western Michigan University from 1975 to 1981 and the United States Naval Academy from 1987 to 1989, compiling a career college football coaching record of 46–64. In June 2018, Uzelac resigned as head football coach at Benton Harbor High School in Benton Harbor, Michigan. In January 2020, Uzelac returned from retirement to become the head coach at Berrien Springs High School.

== Playing career ==
A native of Gary, Indiana, Uzelac played high school football at Tolleston High School. He graduated from Western Michigan University in 1964 with a degree in physical education. A knee injury ended his football playing career before he could letter at Western Michigan, but he was Mid-American Conference outdoor shot put champion as a senior.

== College coaching career ==
Before St. Joseph, Uzelac coached at Bowling Green University, the University of Michigan, Indiana University, Ohio State University, the University of Colorado, the University of Kentucky, the University of Minnesota, the University of Maryland, and the NFL's Cleveland Browns. Most stops were for one or two years, while the longest he stayed at any one school was his seven-year tenure as head coach at Western Michigan University. Along the way he has coached under or alongside Bo Schembechler, Lloyd Carr, John Cooper, Bill McCartney, Don Nehlen, Bill Mallory, Les Miles, and Bill Belichick.

While head coach at Navy, Uzelac had several notable assistants, including Tom Amstutz, Chuck Bresnahan, Steve Belichick, Dean Pees, and Carl Reese. Some assistants had connections to the University of Michigan as either past or future coaches, including Fred Jackson, Greg Mattison, and Mike Trgovac.

While Uzelac has had number of stints in college football as a head coach and as an assistant, his most famous incident occurred in 1991 while he was the offensive coordinator at Ohio State. Uzelac encouraged and pressured players to skip class so they could make practice. This prioritization of football over academics did not sit well with Robert Smith, future Minnesota Vikings running back, who spoke up about the issue. As a result, Smith sat out the season. The next season Uzelac was fired and Smith returned to the team.

== High school coaching career ==
Uzelac began his coaching career as an assistant at Chesterton High School in Chesterton, Indiana in 1964. He was head coach at Logan High School in Logan, West Virginia from 1966 to 1967, compiling a 16–4 record and winning a league championship.

From 2002 to 2003, Uzelac was head football coach at St. John's College High School in Washington, D.C.

In April 2006, Uzelac returned to the state of Michigan to coach at St. Joseph High School. Uzelac led the Bears to a 6–5 record in 2006 after the team went 0–9 the previous season. During the 2007 season, Uzelac led the Bears to a 9–0 regular season record and the Final Four of Michigan high school football. The team won the Big 16 Conference and was named the West Division champions, Division 3 district champions, and Division 3 regional champions. Uzelac was also named 2007 High School Coach of the Year by the Michigan Associated Press. In 2008, Uzelac led the Bears to another 9–0 season and another Big 16 Conference title. The team was ranked #1 in the state for their undefeated season in Division 3. Uzelac resigned as head coach at. St. Joseph on June 29, 2011, with a record of 45–13.

In 2015, Uzelac became head football coach at Benton Harbor High School in Benton Harbor, Michigan. The team had not won a game since 2012 and had a record of 4–68 in the previous eight years. In 2015, his first season there, he led the Tigers to their first winning record since 1989, their first playoff appearance, and their first victory in a playoff game. In his second season, he led the Tigers to an undefeated 9–0 regular season.

In 2020, Uzelac became the head football coach at Berrien Springs High School in Berrien Springs, Michigan. He stepped from his post at Berrien Springs after the 2022 season. He coached the team to a record of 20–8 in with seasons and a BCS Red Division crown in 2021.

== Head coaching record ==
=== College ===
Year	Team	Overall	Conference	Standing	Bowl/playoffs
Western Michigan Broncos (Mid-American Conference) (1975–1981)
1975	Western Michigan	1–10	0–7	9th	
1976	Western Michigan	7–4	6–3	4th	
1977	Western Michigan	4–7	3–5	7th	
1978	Western Michigan	7–4	5–4	4th	
1979	Western Michigan	6–5	5–4	3rd	
1980	Western Michigan	7–4	6–3	2nd	
1981	Western Michigan	6–5	5–4	T–5th	
Western Michigan:		38–39	30–30		
Navy Midshipmen (NCAA Division I-A independent) (1987–1989)
1987	Navy	2–9			
1988	Navy	3–8			
1989	Navy	3–8			
Navy:		8–25			
Total:		46–64			
