= 1981 Eastern Michigan Hurons football team =

American college football season

1981 Eastern Michigan Hurons football
- Conference: Mid-American Conference
- Record: 0–11 (0–9 MAC)
- Head coach: Mike Stock (4th season)
- Captains: Mike Price; Kahle Strickland
- Home stadium: Rynearson Stadium

1981 Mid-American Conference football standings
	Conf.					Overall
Team	W		L		T	W		L		T
Toledo $	8	–	1	–	0	9	–	3	–	0
Miami (OH)	6	–	1	–	1	8	–	2	–	1
Central Michigan	7	–	2	–	0	7	–	4	–	0
Bowling Green	5	–	3	–	1	5	–	5	–	1
Western Michigan	5	–	4	–	0	6	–	5	–	0
Ohio	5	–	4	–	0	5	–	6	–	0
Kent State	3	–	6	–	0	4	–	7	–	0
Ball State	2	–	6	–	0	4	–	7	–	0
Northern Illinois	2	–	7	–	0	3	–	8	–	0
Eastern Michigan	0	–	9	–	0	0	–	11	–	0
$ – Conference champion

The 1981 Eastern Michigan Hurons football team represented Eastern Michigan University in the 1981 NCAA Division I-A football season. In their fourth season under head coach Mike Stock, the Hurons compiled a 0–11 record (0–9 against conference opponents), finished in last place in the Mid-American Conference, and were outscored by their opponents, 338 to 88. The team's statistical leaders included J.F. Green with 1,391 passing yards, Ricky Calhoun with 971 rushing yards, and Jeff Dackin with 440 receiving yards.

== Schedule ==
Date	Opponent	Site	Result	Attendance	Source
September 12	Akron*	Rynearson Stadium; Ypsilanti, MI	L 7–14	9,200	
September 19	at Illinois State *	Hancock Stadium; Normal, IL	L 7–28	13,824	
September 26	Miami (OH)	Rynearson Stadium; Ypsilanti, MI	L 12–18		
October 3	at Central Michigan	Perry Shorts Stadium; Mount Pleasant, MI (rivalry)	L 14–63		
October 10	Toledo ^{†}	Glass Bowl; Toledo, OH	L 7–42		
October 17	at Ohio	Peden Stadium; Athens, OH	L 7–29		
October 24	Northern Illinois	Rynearson Stadium; Ypsilanti, MI	L 7–30		
October 31	at Ball State	Ball State Stadium; Muncie, IN	L 13–35	5,122	
November 7	at Kent State	Dix Stadium; Kent, OH	L 7–13	10,342	
November 14	Bowling Green	Rynearson Stadium; Ypsilanti, MI	L 0–28	9,559	
November 21	at Western Michigan	Waldo Stadium; Kalamazoo, MI	L 7–38		
*Non-conference game; ^{†}Homecoming
