= 1981 Ohio Bobcats football team =

American college football season

1981 Ohio Bobcats football
- Conference: Mid-American Conference
- Record: 5–6 (5–4 MAC)
- Head coach: Brian Burke (3rd season)
- Home stadium: Peden Stadium

1981 Mid-American Conference football standings
	Conf.					Overall
Team	W		L		T	W		L		T
Toledo $	8	–	1	–	0	9	–	3	–	0
Miami (OH)	6	–	1	–	1	8	–	2	–	1
Central Michigan	7	–	2	–	0	7	–	4	–	0
Bowling Green	5	–	3	–	1	5	–	5	–	1
Western Michigan	5	–	4	–	0	6	–	5	–	0
Ohio	5	–	4	–	0	5	–	6	–	0
Kent State	3	–	6	–	0	4	–	7	–	0
Ball State	2	–	6	–	0	4	–	7	–	0
Northern Illinois	2	–	7	–	0	3	–	8	–	0
Eastern Michigan	0	–	9	–	0	0	–	11	–	0
$ – Conference champion

The 1981 Ohio Bobcats football team was an American football team that represented Ohio University in the Mid-American Conference (MAC) during the 1981 NCAA Division I-A football season. In their third season under head coach Brian Burke, the Bobcats compiled a 5–6 record (5–4 against MAC opponents), finished in a tie for fifth place in the MAC, and were outscored by all opponents by a combined total of 257 to 228. They played their home games in Peden Stadium in Athens, Ohio.

== Schedule ==
Date	Opponent	Site	Result	Attendance	Source
September 12	at Minnesota*	Memorial Stadium; Minneapolis, MN	L 17–19	40,086	
September 19	Bowling Green	Peden Stadium; Athens, OH	W 23–21	15,924	
September 26	Ball State	Peden Stadium; Athens, OH	W 30–27		
October 3	at Toledo	Glass Bowl; Toledo, OH	L 14–21		
October 10	Cincinnati*	Peden Stadium; Athens, OH	L 9–19		
October 17	Eastern Michigan	Peden Stadium; Athens, OH	W 29–7		
October 24	at Miami (OH)	Miami Field; Oxford, OH (rivalry)	L 14–40	17,583	
October 31	Central Michigan	Peden Stadium; Athens, OH	L 21–38		
November 7	at Northern Illinois	Huskie Stadium; DeKalb, IL	L 14–38		
November 14	Western Michigan	Peden Stadium; Athens, OH	W 37–20		
November 21	at Kent State	Dix Stadium; Kent, OH	W 20–7	3,000	
*Non-conference game
