= 1983 Western Michigan Broncos football team =

American college football season

1983 Western Michigan Broncos football
- Conference: Mid-American Conference
- Record: 6–5 (4–5 MAC)
- Head coach: Jack Harbaugh (2nd season)
- Offensive coordinator: Steve Szabo (2nd season)
- MVP: Shawn Faulkner
- Captains: Kurt Barterian; Demetrius Jones
- Home stadium: Waldo Stadium

1983 Mid-American Conference football standings
	Conf.					Overall
Team	W		L		T	W		L		T
Northern Illinois $	8	–	1	–	0	10	–	2	–	0
Toledo	7	–	2	–	0	9	–	2	–	0
Bowling Green	7	–	2	–	0	8	–	3	–	0
Central Michigan	7	–	2	–	0	8	–	3	–	0
Ball State	4	–	4	–	0	6	–	5	–	0
Western Michigan	4	–	5	–	0	6	–	5	–	0
Miami (OH)	3	–	5	–	0	4	–	7	–	0
Ohio	3	–	6	–	0	4	–	7	–	0
Kent State	1	–	8	–	0	1	–	10	–	0
Eastern Michigan	0	–	9	–	0	1	–	10	–	0
$ – Conference champion

The 1983 Western Michigan Broncos football team represented Western Michigan University in the Mid-American Conference (MAC) during the 1983 NCAA Division I-A football season. In their second season under head coach Jack Harbaugh, the Broncos compiled a 6–5 record (4–5 against MAC opponents), finished in sixth place in the MAC, and were outscored by their opponents, 208 to 179. The team played its home games at Waldo Stadium in Kalamazoo, Michigan.

The team's statistical leaders included Steve Hoffman with 1,407 passing yards, Shawn Faulkner with 1,668 rushing yards, and Kelly Spielmaker with 653 receiving yards. Fullback Kurt Barterian and defensive back Demetrius Jones were the team captains. Shawn Faulkner received the team's most outstanding player award. Tight end Kelly Spielmaker was named the MAC freshman of the year.

== Schedule ==
Date	Opponent	Site	Result	Attendance	Source
September 10	at UT Arlington*	Maverick Stadium; Arlington, TX	W 21–14		
September 17	at Illinois State*	Hancock Stadium; Normal, IL	W 41–14		
September 24	Central Michigan	Waldo Stadium; Kalamazoo, MI (rivalry)	L 14–32	32,416	
October 1	at Miami (OH)	Yager Stadium; Oxford, OH	W 20–18	27,991	
October 8	at Northern Illinois	Huskie Stadium; DeKalb, IL	L 3–27	26,250	
October 15	Bowling Green	Waldo Stadium; Kalamazoo, MI	L 20–23	19,885	
October 22	Ball State	Waldo Stadium; Kalamazoo, MI	L 20–24	9,650	
October 29	at Ohio	Peden Stadium; Athens, OH	W 16–14	10,500	
November 5	Toledo	Waldo Stadium; Kalamazoo, MI	L 13–17		
November 12	at Kent State	Dix Stadium; Kent, OH	W 21–13	4,100	
November 19	Eastern Michigan	Waldo Stadium; Kalamazoo, MI	W 14–10	3,593	
*Non-conference game
