= Yager Stadium (Miami University) =

Sporting venue in the United States

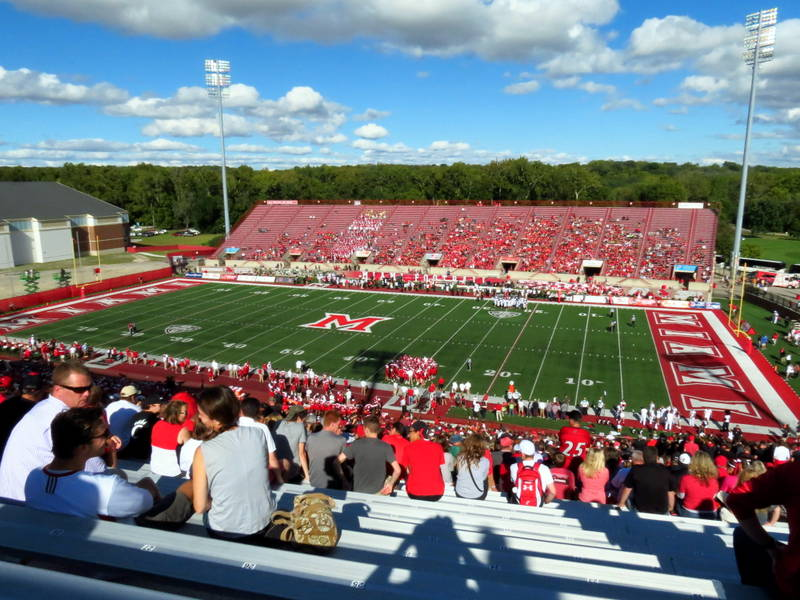
- View from the west grandstand
- Interactive map of Yager Stadium
- Location: Weeb Ewbank Way; Oxford, Ohio 45056
- Coordinates: 39°31′10″N 84°43′58″W
- Owner: Miami University
- Operator: Miami University
- Capacity: 24,286 (2005–present); 30,012 (1995–2004); 25,183 (1983–1994)
- Surface: FieldTurf (2003–present); Natural Grass (1983–2002)
- Record attendance: 30,087 (October 2, 1999 vs Marshall)

Construction
- Groundbreaking: 1982
- Opened: October 1, 1983
- Renovated: 2003–2005
- Cost: $13.5 million ($43.6 million in 2025 dollars)
- Architects: Clough, Harbour & Associates (renovations)

Tenant
- Miami RedHawks (NCAA) (1983–present)

Yager Stadium is a football stadium in Oxford, Ohio, United States, on the campus of Miami University. It is home to the Miami RedHawks football team. Built in 1983, the stadium has a seating capacity of 24,286. It replaced Miami Field, which had been used since 1895. The stadium is named for Fred C. Yager, class of 1914, who was the lead benefactor in stadium's construction.

== History and design ==
The stadium has an unbalanced layout, with the west grandstands being 20 rows taller than the east (student) grandstands. A small set of bleachers sit in the north end zone; there are no seats in the south end zone under the main scoreboard. A Cradle of Coaches room is located inside the stadium, along with football offices, player meeting rooms, and locker rooms.

The university has undertaken a continued series of facility upgrades beginning in 2003 with the addition of a FieldTurf playing surface. Other recent substantial upgrades of the facility include broadcast-quality permanent lighting, a new scoreboard with three Daktronics videoboards and the Cradle of Coaches plaza in 2004, and new student bleacher sections on the east sideline and the north end zone in 2005.

The Dauch Indoor Sports Center at the north end zone opened in 2015. The 91,000-square-foot building includes a turf football field and other practice facilities for track and field sports. The construction was funded in part by former Miami football players David Dauch and Ben Roethlisberger, after whom the indoor field is named.

== Largest attendance ==
Rank	Date	Attendance	Opponent	Result
1	October 2, 1999	30,087	#17 Marshall	L, 14–32
2	October 18, 1997	29,027	Marshall	W, 45–21
3	October 1, 1983	28,230	Western Michigan	L, 18–20
4	November 4, 2003	28,023	#15 Bowling Green	W, 33–10
5	October 29, 1983	28,012	Northern Illinois	L, 0–17
6	November 2, 1991	27,884	Bowling Green	L, 7–17
7	November 1, 1986	27,840	Central Michigan	W, 59–21
8	October 25, 1997	27,702	Cincinnati	L, 31–34^{2OT}
9	September 27, 2003	27,512	Cincinnati	W, 42–37
10	October 17, 1987	27,382	Ohio	W, 10–9

== See also ==
- List of NCAA Division I FBS football stadiums
