= 1983 Northern Illinois Huskies football team =

American college football season

1983 Northern Illinois Huskies football

MAC champion California Bowl champion

California Bowl, W 20–13 vs. Cal State Fullerton
- Conference: Mid-American Conference
- Record: 10–2 (8–1 MAC)
- Head coach: Bill Mallory (4th season)
- Defensive coordinator: Joe Novak (4th season)
- MVP: Tim Tyrrell
- Captains: Scott Bolzan; Steve Hirsch; Jim Mukite
- Home stadium: Huskie Stadium

1983 Mid-American Conference football standings
	Conf.					Overall
Team	W		L		T	W		L		T
Northern Illinois $	8	–	1	–	0	10	–	2	–	0
Toledo	7	–	2	–	0	9	–	2	–	0
Bowling Green	7	–	2	–	0	8	–	3	–	0
Central Michigan	7	–	2	–	0	8	–	3	–	0
Ball State	4	–	4	–	0	6	–	5	–	0
Western Michigan	4	–	5	–	0	6	–	5	–	0
Miami (OH)	3	–	5	–	0	4	–	7	–	0
Ohio	3	–	6	–	0	4	–	7	–	0
Kent State	1	–	8	–	0	1	–	10	–	0
Eastern Michigan	0	–	9	–	0	1	–	10	–	0
$ – Conference champion

The 1983 Northern Illinois Huskies football team represented Northern Illinois University as a member of the Mid-American Conference (MAC) during 1983 NCAA Division I-A football season. Led by Bill Mallory in his fourth and final season as head coach, the Huskies compiled an overall record of 10–2 with a mark of 8–1 in conference play, winning he MAC title. Northern Illinois was invited to the California Bowl, where they beat played Cal State Fullerton. The team played home games at Huskie Stadium in DeKalb, Illinois.

The Huskies won their conference championship since 1965, since the 1965 team won the Interstate Intercollegiate Athletic Conference (IIAC) title during the final years of the conference's existence. The Huskies' trip to the California Bowl was also their first bowl game since 1965 and first bowl win since the 1963 team won the Mineral Water Bowl and was ranked atop the AP small college football rankings.

== Schedule ==
Date	Opponent	Site	Result	Attendance	Source
September 3	at Kansas*	Memorial Stadium; Lawrence, KS	W 37–34	26,000	
September 10	at Wisconsin*	Camp Randall Stadium; Madison, WI	L 9–37	56,941	
September 24	at Kent State	Dix Stadium; Kent, OH	W 38–7	8,321	
October 1	at Ball State	Ball State Stadium; Muncie, IN (rivalry)	W 27–14	15,075	
October 8	Western Michigan	Huskie Stadium; DeKalb, IL	W 27–3	26,250	
October 15	at Eastern Michigan	Rynearson Stadium; Ypsilanti, MI	W 34–15	8,010	
October 22	Bowling Green^{†}	Huskie Stadium; DeKalb, IL	W 24–23	18,500	
October 29	at Miami (OH)	Yager Stadium; Oxford, OH	W 17–0	27,866	
November 5	at Central Michigan	Perry Shorts Stadium; Mount Pleasant, MI	L 14–30	19,274	
November 12	Toledo	Huskie Stadium; DeKalb, IL	W 26–10	27,700	
November 19	Ohio	Huskie Stadium; DeKalb, IL	W 41–17	21,500	
December 17	vs. Cal State Fullerton*	Bulldog Stadium; Fresno, CA (California Bowl)	W 20–13	20,464	
*Non-conference game; ^{†}Homecoming
