= Doyt Perry Stadium =

Football stadium at Bowling Green State University

- The Doyt
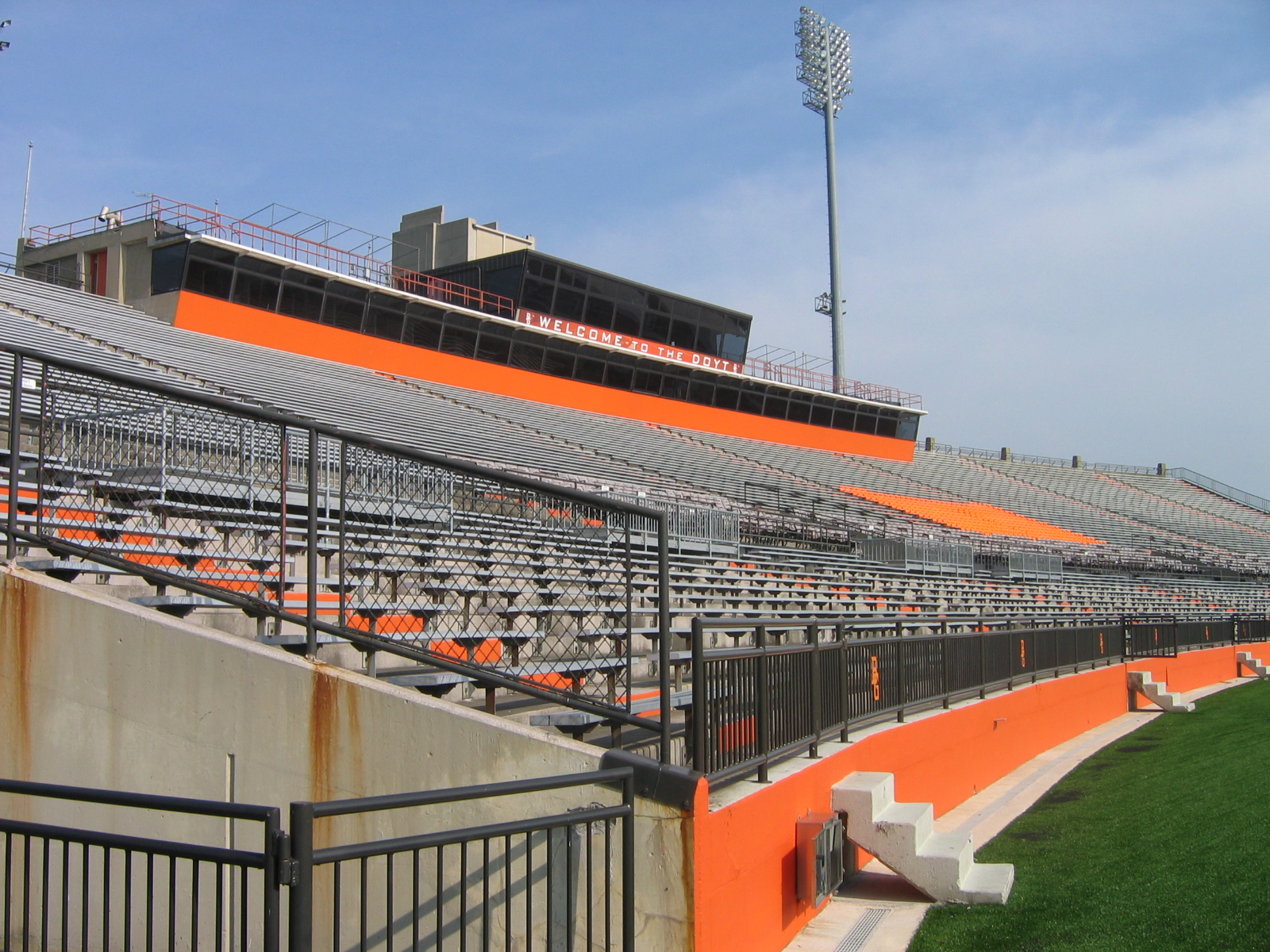
- The stadium in 2008
- Interactive map of Doyt Perry Stadium
- Full name: Doyt L. Perry Stadium
- Address: Stadium Drive; Bowling Green, OH; United States
- Coordinates: 41°22′41″N 83°37′21″W
- Owner: Bowling Green State University
- Operator: Bowling Green State University
- Capacity: 23,272 (1966–1981) 33,527 (1982–2006) 24,000 (2007–present)
- Type: Stadium
- Surface: Field Turf (2007–present); Grass (1966–2006)
- Record attendance: 33,527 (October 8, 1983 vs. Toledo)
- Current use: American football

Construction
- Groundbreaking: 1965
- Opened: October 1, 1966; 60 years ago
- Cost: $3 million
- Architect: Technicon Design Group (renovations)

Tenant
- Bowling Green Falcons (NCAA) (1966–present)

Website
- bgsufalcons.com/doyt-perry-stadium

Doyt L. Perry Stadium is a stadium on the campus of Bowling Green State University in Bowling Green, Ohio, United States. It is primarily used for American football, and is the home field of the Bowling Green Falcons football team. It opened in 1966 and originally held 23,272 people.

== History ==
=== Beginning and development ===
On October 1, 1966, the stadium opened with a 13–0 win over Dayton. The stadium was named for Doyt Perry, a highly successful coach and athletic director at the school.

It was meant to replace University Stadium, a WPA stadium in the heart of campus which lasted 43 seasons. In 1975 the stadium hosted the Poe Ditch Music Festival.

On October 8, 1983, the annual Toledo-Bowling Green football game established a school and MAC attendance record of 33,527.

=== Renovations ===
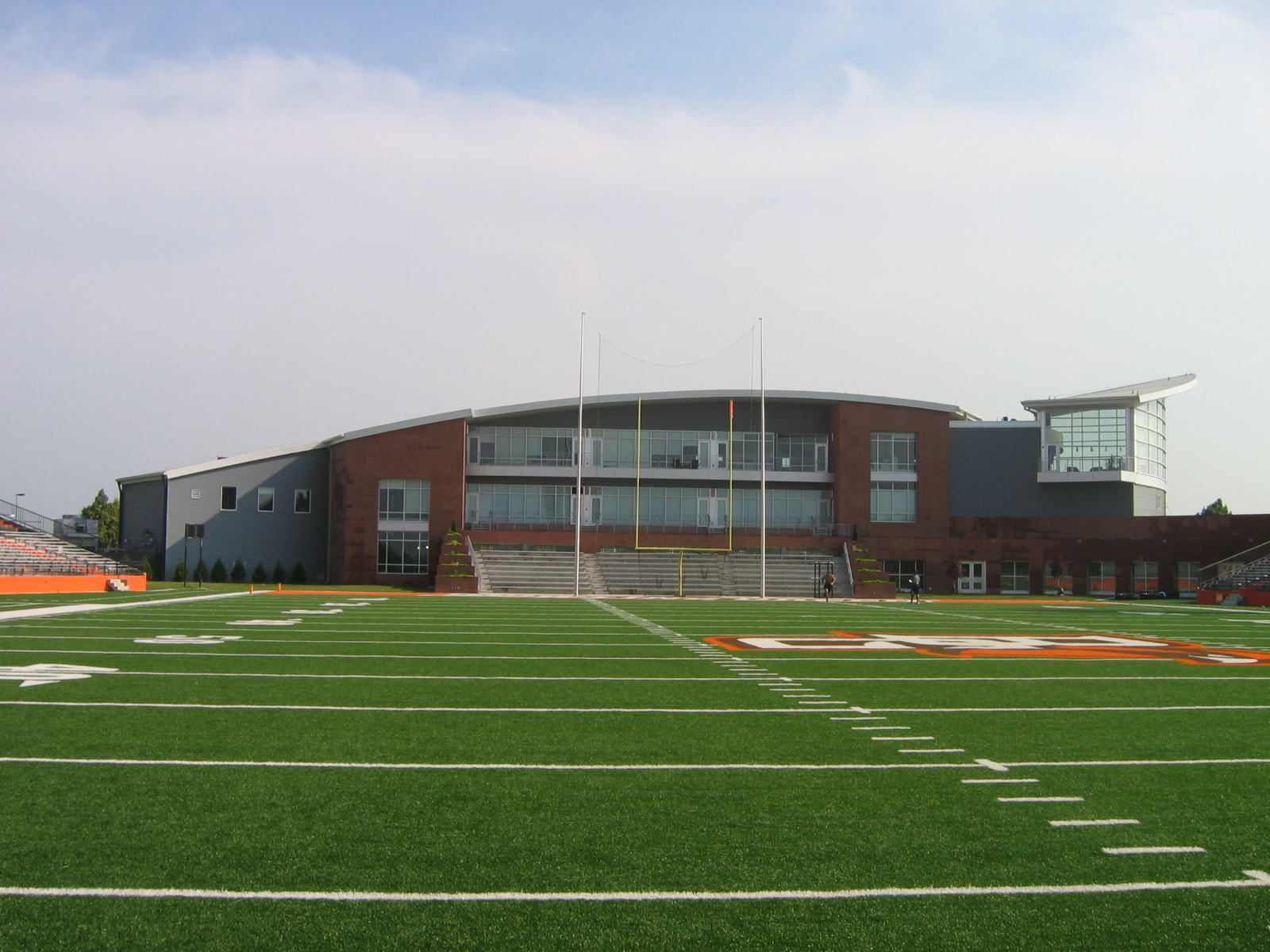
The Sebo Center Endzone Facility in 2008

For the 2007 football season the stadium received an upgrade. The Sebo Center was built and enclosed the north endzone. It houses band seating, luxury suites, offices, training facilities and new box offices. The grass field was also replaced with a Fieldturf artificial surface.

Nevertheless, Doyt Perry Stadium has the second smallest capacity of any stadium among schools in the MAC - ahead of only Ball State University's Scheumann Stadium. Additionally in 2007, the stadium underwent further renovations, complying with new NCAA seating regulations which increased the listed capacity from 23,272 to 24,000.

== Features ==
The stadium consists of two bowed sideline grandstands. The stadium also featured steel grandstands at the north and south ends. The south grandstands were removed to make way for a merchandise tent and a pavilion for the Falcon Club boosters. The north grandstand was removed to facilitate the construction of the Sebo Athletic Center. Through the 2019 season, the Falcons have a 172-103-6 record at Doyt Perry Stadium.

== See also ==
- List of NCAA Division I FBS football stadiums
