= 1981–82 NCAA football bowl games =

College football postseason game series

- Season: 1981
- Number of bowls: 16
- Bowl games: December 12, 1981 – January 1, 1982
- National Championship: 1982 Orange Bowl
- Location of Championship: Miami Orange Bowl, Miami, Florida
- Champions: Clemson Tigers
Bowl record by conference
Conference	Bowls	Record	Final AP poll
Independents	5	3–2 (0.600)	4
Big Eight	5	2–3 (0.400)	3
SEC	5	2–3 (0.400)	2
Big Ten	4	2–2 (0.500)	3
Pac-10	4	1–3 (0.250)	3
SWC	4	2–2 (0.500)	2
ACC	2	2–0 (1.000)	2
WAC	1	1–0 (1.000)	1
MAC	1	1–0 (1.000)	0
PCAA	1	0–1 (0.000)	0

The 1981–82 NCAA football bowl games were a series of post-season games played in December 1981 and January 1982 to end the 1981 NCAA Division I-A football season. A total of 16 team-competitive games, and two all-star games, were played. The post-season began with the Independence Bowl on December 12, 1981, and concluded on January 16, 1982, with the season-ending Senior Bowl.

== Schedule ==
Date	Game	Site	Time (US EST)	TV	Matchup (pre-game record)	AP pre-game rank	UPI (Coaches) pre-game rank
12/12	Independence Bowl	Independence Stadium; Shreveport, Louisiana		Mizlou	Texas A&M 33 (6–5) (SWC), Oklahoma State 16 (7–4) (Big Eight)	NR; NR	NR; NR
12/13	Garden State Bowl	Giants Stadium; East Rutherford, New Jersey		Mizlou	Tennessee 28 (7–4) (SEC), Wisconsin 21 (7–4) (Big Ten)	NR; NR	NR; NR
12/18	Holiday Bowl	Jack Murphy Stadium; San Diego, California		ESPN	BYU 38 (10–2) (WAC Champion), Washington State 36 (8–2–1) (Pac-10)	#14 #20	#12 #18
12/19	Tangerine Bowl	Orlando Stadium; Orlando, Florida		Mizlou	Missouri 19 (7–4) (Big Eight), Southern Miss 17 (9–1–1) (Independent)	NR #18	NR #15
12/19	California Bowl	Bulldog Stadium; Fresno, California		Mizlou	Toledo 27 (8–3) (MAC Champion); San Jose State 25 (9–2) (PCAA Champion)	NR; NR	NR #20
12/26	Sun Bowl	Sun Bowl; El Paso, Texas		CBS	Oklahoma 40 (6–4–1) (Big Eight), Houston 14 (7–3–1) (SWC)	NR; NR	NR #19
12/28	Gator Bowl	Gator Bowl Stadium; Jacksonville, Florida		ABC	North Carolina 31 (9–2) (ACC), Arkansas 27 (8–3) (SWC)	#11; NR	#9 #17
12/30	Liberty Bowl	Liberty Bowl Memorial Stadium; Memphis, Tennessee		USA	Ohio State 31 (8–3) (Big Ten co-Champion), Navy 28 (7–3–1) (Independent)	#15; NR	#14; NR
12/31	Peach Bowl	Fulton County Stadium; Atlanta	3:00 PM	CBS	West Virginia 26 (8–3) (Independent), Florida 6 (7–4) (SEC)	NR; NR	NR; NR
12/31	Hall of Fame Classic	Legion Field; Birmingham, Alabama	1:00 PM	Mizlou	Mississippi State 10 (7–4) (SEC), Kansas 0 (8–3) (Big Eight)	NR; NR	NR; NR
12/31	Astro-Bluebonnet Bowl	Houston Astrodome; Houston, Texas	8:00 PM	Mizlou	Michigan 33 (8–3) (Big Ten), UCLA 14 (7–3–1) (Pac-10)	#16 #19	#13 #16
1/1	Cotton Bowl Classic	Cotton Bowl; Dallas, Texas	12:00 PM	CBS	Texas 14 (9–1–1) (SWC), Alabama 12 (9–1–1) (SEC co-Champion)	#6 #3	#5 #3
1/1	Fiesta Bowl	Sun Devil Stadium; Tempe, Arizona	1:30 PM	NBC	Penn State 26 (9–2) (Independent), USC 10 (9–2) (Pac-10)	#7 #8	#6 #7
1/1	Rose Bowl	Rose Bowl; Pasadena, California	4:30 PM	NBC	Washington 28 (9–2) (Pac-10 Champion), Iowa 0 (8–3) (Big Ten co-Champion)	#12 #13	#10 #11
1/1	Sugar Bowl	Louisiana Superdome; New Orleans, Louisiana	8:00 PM	ABC	Pittsburgh 24 (10–1) (Independent), Georgia 20 (10–1) (SEC co-Champion)	#10 #2	#8 #2
1/1	Orange Bowl	Miami Orange Bowl; Miami	8:00 PM	NBC	Clemson 22 (11–0) (ACC Champion), Nebraska 15 (9–2) (Big Eight Champion)	#1 #4	#1 #4
