= 1982 Fiesta Bowl =

- 11th Fiesta Bowl
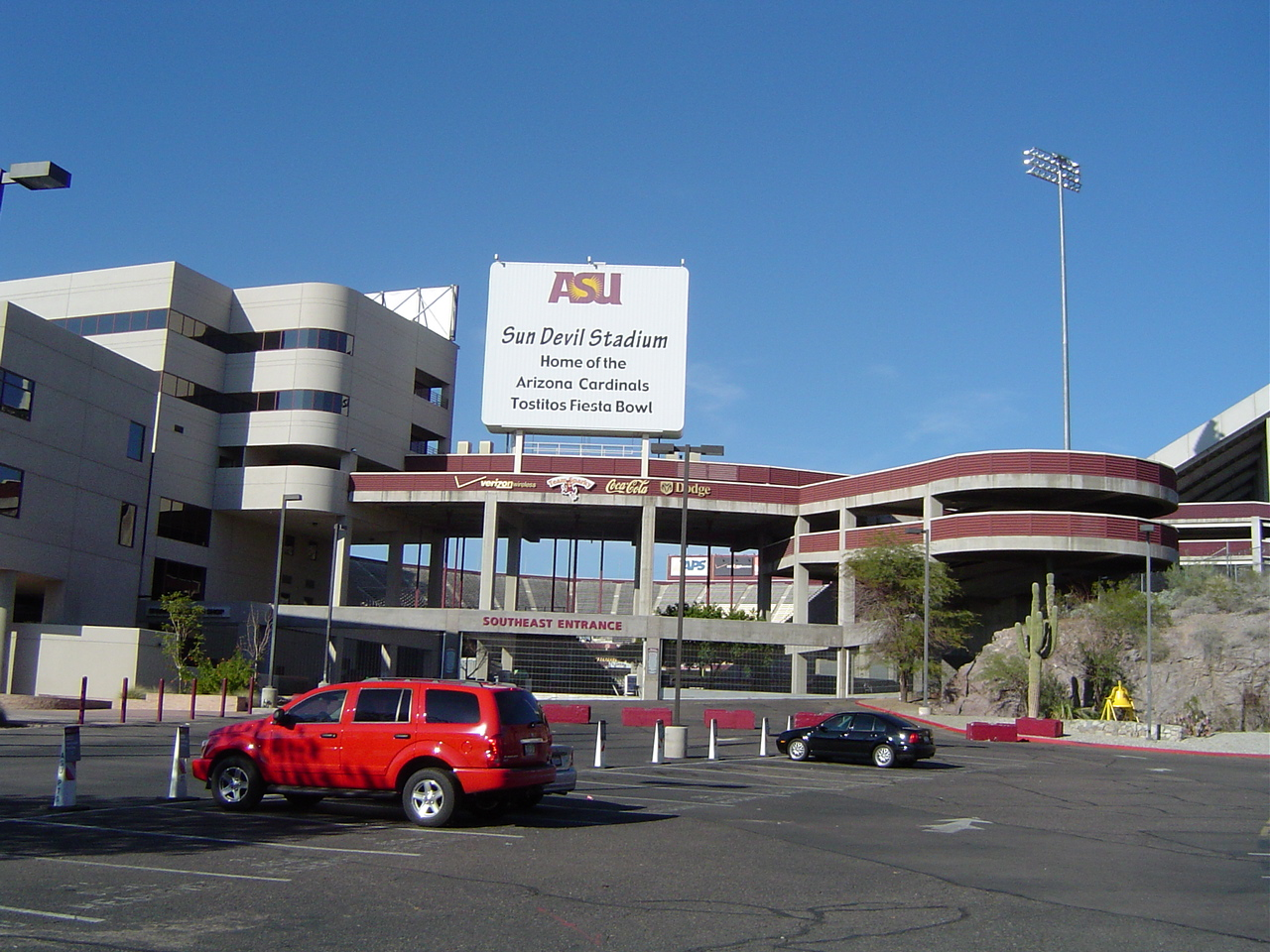
- Sun Devil Stadium in Tempe, Arizona, hosted the Fiesta Bowl.
Penn State Nittany Lions	USC Trojans
(9–2)	(9–2)
Independent	Pac-10
26	10
Head coach: Joe Paterno	Head coach: John Robinson
AP / Coaches; 7 / 6	AP / Coaches; 8 / 7
	1	2	3	4	Total
Penn State	7	10	9	0	26
USC	7	0	3	0	10
- Date: January 1, 1982
- Season: 1981
- Stadium: Sun Devil Stadium
- Location: Tempe, Arizona
- MVP: Curt Warner (Penn State RB); Leo Wisniewski (Penn State NT)
- Favorite: USC by 2 points
- Referee: John A. McClintock (Big Eight)
- Attendance: 71,053

United States TV coverage
- Network: NBC
- Announcers: Charlie Jones, Len Dawson

The 1982 Fiesta Bowl was the eleventh edition of the college football bowl game, played at Sun Devil Stadium in Tempe, Arizona on Friday, January 1. Part of the 1981–82 bowl game season, it matched the seventh-ranked independent Penn State Nittany Lions and the #8 USC Trojans of the Pacific-10 Conference. A slight underdog, Penn State won, 26–10.

This was the first Fiesta Bowl played in January, in light of the bowl game's increasing popularity due to the sunny climate which had games with a team ranked in the top ten appearing in the eight of the first ten editions. It was the second Fiesta Bowl with both teams in the top ten; the first was six years earlier, and the third was in 1986.

== Teams ==
This was Penn State's second straight Fiesta Bowl and USC's first.

=== Penn State ===
The Nittany Lions had spent a week ranked #1 before a loss to Miami knocked them to #6 and a loss to Alabama ultimately dropped them out of championship contention, though they finished the season on a two-game winning streak and ranked in the top 10 for the second straight year.

=== USC ===
The Trojans were third in the Pacific-10 Conference after losses to Arizona (which knocked them out of being ranked #1) and Washington (which not only knocked them out of being ranked #3 but also cost them the Pac-10 title) relegated them to this game. One notable highlight was Marcus Allen, who after winning the Heisman Trophy with the first 2,000 yard season, was playing his final collegiate game.

== Game summary ==
The game kicked off shortly after 11:30 a.m. MST, leading off a bowl tripleheader on NBC (Rose, Orange). The Fiesta started a half hour before the Cotton Bowl on CBS; the Sugar Bowl (ABC) moved to a night game this year, opposite the Orange.

USC had more turnovers and punts than Penn State while being outrushed and outyarded by Penn State in a wet soggy game that was at one point 24–7. Halfback Curt Warner scored on a touchdown run early in the first quarter on his first carry of the game. But USC responded when 1981 College Football All-American linebacker Chip Banks returned an interception return 20 yards for a touchdown. Gregg Garrity caught a long touchdown pass from Todd Blackledge 52 yards away to give Penn State the lead they would never again relinquish. Brian Franco added a field goal before the half ended to give Penn State a 17–7 halftime lead.

Warner added his second touchdown run of the day and USC could only respond with a field goal by Steve Jordan. When USC was stopped deep in its own territory later in the quarter, Dave Paffenroth's punt was blocked and went out of the end zone for a safety; the Nittany Lions led 26–10 after three quarters. The fourth quarter was scoreless and Penn State repeated as Fiesta Bowl champions.

=== Scoring ===
First quarter

- PSU – Curt Warner 17-yard run (Brian Franco kick)
- USC – Chip Banks 20-yard interception return (Steve Jordan kick)

Second quarter

- PSU – Gregg Garrity 52-yard pass from Todd Blackledge (Franco kick)
- PSU – Franco 21-yard field goal

Third quarter

- PSU – Warner 21-yard run (Franco kick)
- USC – Jordan 37-yard field goal
- PSU – Safety (Dave Paffenroth punt blocked out of end zone)

Fourth quarter

No scoring

== Statistics ==
Statistics	Penn State	USC
First downs	20	19
Yards rushing	51–218	41–60
Yards passing	175	202
Passing	11–24–2	16–32–3
Return yards	78	38
Total Offense	75–393	73–262
Punts–Average	4–50.8	5–40.2
Fumbles–Lost	3–2	3–2
Turnovers	4	5
Penalties–Yards	7–70	7–49
Time of Possession	29:44	30:16
