= Oliver Luck =

American football player and sports executive (born 1960)

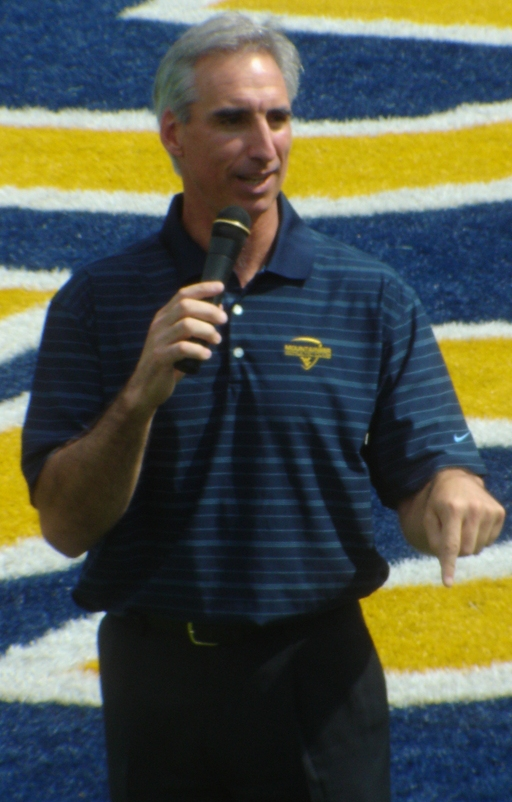

1st Commissioner of the XFL
- In office June 5, 2018 – April 10, 2020
- Succeeded by: Dwayne Johnson

11th Athletic Director of West Virginia University
- In office August 20, 2010 – December 17, 2014
- Preceded by: Ed Pastilong
- Succeeded by: Shane Lyons

Personal details
- Born: Oliver Francis Luck; April 5, 1960 (age 66) Cleveland, Ohio, U.S.
- Party: Republican
- Spouse: Kathy Wilson
- Children: 4 including Andrew Luck
- Education: West Virginia University (B.A.); University of Texas (J.D.)
- Football career

No. 10
- Position: Quarterback

Personal information
- Listed height: 6 ft 2 in (1.88 m)
- Listed weight: 196 lb (89 kg)

Career information
- High school: St. Ignatius (Cleveland, Ohio)
- College: West Virginia
- NFL draft: 1982: 2nd round, 44th overall pick

Career history

Playing
- Houston Oilers (1982–1986)

Operations
- Frankfurt Galaxy (1991–1992) General manager; Rhein Fire (1995–1996) General manager; NFL Europe (1996–2000) President; Houston Sports Authority (2001–2005) Chief executive officer; Houston Dynamo (2005–2010) President and general manager; West Virginia (2010–2014) Athletic director; NCAA (2014–2018) Executive vice president for regulatory affairs; XFL (2018–2020) Commissioner and chief executive officer

Awards and highlights
- 2× First-team Academic All-American (1980, 1981); First-team All-East (1980); Second-team All-East (1981); 2× WVU team MVP (1980, 1981); Louis D. Meisel Award (1981); WVU Sports Hall of Fame; WVU All-Time team (1980–89)

Career NFL statistics
- Passing attempts: 413
- Passing completions: 233
- Completion percentage: 56.4%
- TD–INT: 13–21
- Passing yards: 2,544
- Passer rating: 64.1
- Stats at Pro Football Reference

Oliver Francis Luck (born April 5, 1960) is an American business executive and former professional football player. He is currently the executive director of the United Athletic Conference (football), a new NCAA Division I FCS conference starting play in 2023 as a football-only merger of the ASUN Conference and Western Athletic Conference. He was the CEO and Commissioner of the XFL until it suspended operations due to the COVID-19 pandemic. Prior to that, he was Director of Intercollegiate Athletes at West Virginia University (WVU), his alma mater, and an executive with the National Collegiate Athletic Association (NCAA) in charge of the organization's regulatory functions. Luck played football professionally as a quarterback for five seasons in the National Football League (NFL) for the Houston Oilers (1982–1986). He was also the first president and general manager of the Houston Dynamo of Major League Soccer (MLS). Under his watch, the Dynamo won the MLS Cup in 2006 and 2007.

He is the father of former Indianapolis Colts quarterback Andrew Luck.

== Football career ==
=== Collegiate career ===
Darryl Talley (left) and Oliver Luck celebrate WVU's 1981 Peach Bowl victory

Luck attended St. Ignatius High School in Cleveland, where he was a standout quarterback. He then enrolled at WVU, playing quarterback from 1978 to 1981. In his freshman season, Luck only had 151 yards passing and five interceptions. As a sophomore in 1979, he passed for 1,292 yards and eight touchdowns, but threw 12 interceptions. He also rushed for 407 yards and five touchdowns, including a career-high 120 yards against Tulane.

In his junior season of 1980, Luck earned first-team Academic All-American honors. Luck's 19 touchdown passes was a school record, while he also added 1,874 yards. As a senior in 1981, he led the Mountaineers to the Peach Bowl where they defeated the Florida Gators by a score of 26–6. Also named Academic All-American for the second consecutive season, Luck threw for a school record 216 completions and 394 attempts to add to his 2,448 yards and 16 touchdowns. He added career-highs 360 passing yards and a school-record 34 completions in a loss to Syracuse that season.

Luck, who was a three-year starter, ended his career with school records of 43 career touchdown passes, 466 completions, and 911 pass attempts. His 5,765 career passing yards currently ranks fourth on the all-time school list. Luck still ranks in the top ten in nearly every career passing category.

Luck was a finalist to be a Rhodes Scholar (but he did not obtain the scholarship), a National Football Foundation Scholar, and a two-time GTE/CoSIDA Academic All-American who graduated magna cum laude from WVU in 1982. He was named the team MVP in 1980 and 1981 and won the 1981 Louis D. Meisel Award. He is a member of Phi Beta Kappa. Luck was inducted into the Academic All-America Hall of Fame in 2000.

=== Professional career ===
Luck was the 44th overall selection in the 1982 NFL draft, taken in the second round by the Houston Oilers. He was the third quarterback taken, after Art Schlichter (4th to Baltimore) and Jim McMahon (5th to Chicago). As a rookie in the strike-shortened 1982 season, Luck saw no action. In his second season, the Oilers inserted him at the starting quarterback position, from which he threw eight touchdowns and 13 interceptions, completing 124 of 217 pass attempts for 1,375 yards as the Oilers struggled to a 2–14 record. He was a teammate of fellow quarterback Archie Manning during the 1982 and 1983 seasons.

In 1984, the Oilers signed Canadian Football League star Warren Moon. Luck played as Moon's back-up for the majority of the season. He completed 22 of 36 pass attempts for 256 yards, two of which were touchdown passes, with one interception. Luck also had some success running the ball, with 10 carries for 75 yards and one touchdown.

In 1985 and 1986, Luck continued to play back-up to Moon. He threw 100 passes in 1985, completing 56 of them with two touchdowns and two interceptions. In 1986, Luck's final season in the NFL, he completed 31 of 60 passes for 341 yards with one touchdown and five interceptions.

== Post-football career ==
After retiring from pro football, Luck earned a J.D. from the University of Texas School of Law in 1987. He graduated with honors, then accepted a fellowship to study the European Union and its legal system in Germany. Luck is also a long-time member of the American Council on Germany. In 1990, he was the Republican nominee for Congress from West Virginia's 2nd congressional district, which included his alma mater, but was defeated by incumbent Democrat Harley O. Staggers Jr. An ethical controversy arose after his campaign used a mailing list generated by the non-profit Mountaineer Athletic Club to send a photo of himself as WVU's quarterback, along with a letter from Luck, to over 4000 of the club's contributors. A state ethics commission report subsequently found that the list had been generated at Luck's request, and Luck apologized.

In 1991, he became general manager of the Frankfurt Galaxy of the fledgling World League of American Football. He held the post for two years until the league was suspended. Upon its resumption in 1995, he became general manager of the Rhein Fire, and was named league president the following year. Luck held that role until 2000, during which time he oversaw the league's rebranding as NFL Europe, intended to strengthen the connection between the league and its parent, the NFL.

In 2001 Luck was sworn in as Chief Executive Officer of the Houston Sports Authority. In this role he oversaw the operations of the Harris County Houston Sports Authority, the governmental entity created in 1997 to provide the financing, construction and management oversight of the three large sports and entertainment venues in Houston: Minute Maid Park (home of the Houston Astros), Reliant Stadium, (home of the Houston Texans and the Houston Livestock Show and Rodeo), and the new Downtown multi-purpose arena (home of the Houston Rockets and Comets).

Prior to joining the Sports Authority, Luck was a top-ranking executive with the National Football League for more than ten years, where he served as Vice President of Business Development and President and CEO of NFL Europe. In 2005, he was named president of the Houston Dynamo of Major League Soccer. Luck worked with the City and County to create a publicly funded downtown soccer stadium, BBVA Compass Stadium, which opened to much fanfare in March 2012.

On June 27, 2008, Luck was appointed by West Virginia Governor Joe Manchin to the West Virginia University Board of Governors, effective July 1. On June 9, 2010, Luck was hired as the athletic director of West Virginia University. Two years later his name surfaced as a potential candidate to fill the open athletic director's slot at Stanford University, where his son Andrew played quarterback and one of his daughters played volleyball. But Luck announced on May 17, 2012, that he was staying at WVU.

During Luck's tenure the WVU athletic program made significant changes, including: WVU's move from the Big East Conference to the Big 12 Conference; the resignation of head football coach Bill Stewart and subsequent promotion of Dana Holgorsen to that spot; and the firing of baseball coach Greg Van Zant, instituted beer sales at football stadiums, restructured the WVU compliance office, and took the school off of major probation; facilitated multi-media rights to IMG in a 12-year, $86million guaranteed deal, added men's golf after a 32-year hiatus; hired baseball coach Randy Mazey who led the team to a 3rd-place finish in the Big 12, and organized state TIF funding to build a new baseball stadium eventually known as Monongalia County Ballpark.

As of October 12, 2012, WVU amended Luck's employment agreement, extending his contract through 2017.

On October 14, 2013, Luck was one of 13 members unanimously chosen by the College Football Playoff Management Committee to select the four teams to compete in the first College Football Playoff which was to be held in 2015.

On December 17, 2014, the NCAA announced that Luck would take a newly created post as executive vice president for regulatory affairs. Luck is in charge of all national office regulatory functions, including academics, membership, eligibility, and enforcement. The position had been created by current NCAA president Mark Emmert as part of a major restructuring of his senior staff. Notably, the NCAA offices are in Indianapolis, where Andrew played at the time.

On June 5, 2018, the XFL announced that Luck would be the league's Commissioner and CEO. After a start that was possibly "the best launch of a new sports league in the last 30 years, if not ever," the league suspended play on March 12, 2020, due to the outbreak of the coronavirus. On Thursday April 9, XFL owner Vince McMahon fired Oliver Luck two working days before the league filed for bankruptcy. Luck sued XFL owner Vince McMahon for wrongful termination on April 21. As XFL President Jeffrey Pollack noted: "Our shutdown and our bankruptcy filing had nothing to do with anything other than the pandemic. Our business was working, our proof of concept was successful, and we were on our way to a phenomenal first season."

Luck was named on January 5, 2023 as the executive director (de facto commissioner) of the newly formed ASUN–WAC Football Conference. The football-only merger of the ASUN Conference and Western Athletic Conference is set to start play in the 2023 season in the second tier of NCAA Division I football, the Football Championship Subdivision.

== Personal life ==
Luck is married to the former Kathy Wilson, with whom he has four children: Andrew, Mary Ellen, Emily, and Addison. The three oldest are graduates of Stanford University, where Andrew played football and Mary Ellen played volleyball. When Luck's NCAA employment was announced, Addison was attending Morgantown High School. Andrew played quarterback at Stanford and was selected number one overall by the Indianapolis Colts in the 2012 NFL draft.

While being teammates with Archie Manning on the Texans, Luck would frequently help the Manning family, driving a young Cooper and Peyton Manning around town. Peyton Manning would later grow up to be considered one of the greatest quarterbacks in NFL history, and the predecessor at quarterback to Luck's son Andrew.

In addition to his professional pursuits, Luck was actively involved as a coach for youth sports.
