= 1981 Peach Bowl =

The 1981 Peach Bowl may refer to:

- 1981 Peach Bowl (January) - January 2, 1981, game between the Miami Hurricanes and the Virginia Tech Hokies
- 1981 Peach Bowl (December) - December 31, 1981, game between the Florida Gators and the West Virginia Mountaineers
