= 1982 Cotton Bowl Classic =

- 46th Cotton Bowl Classic
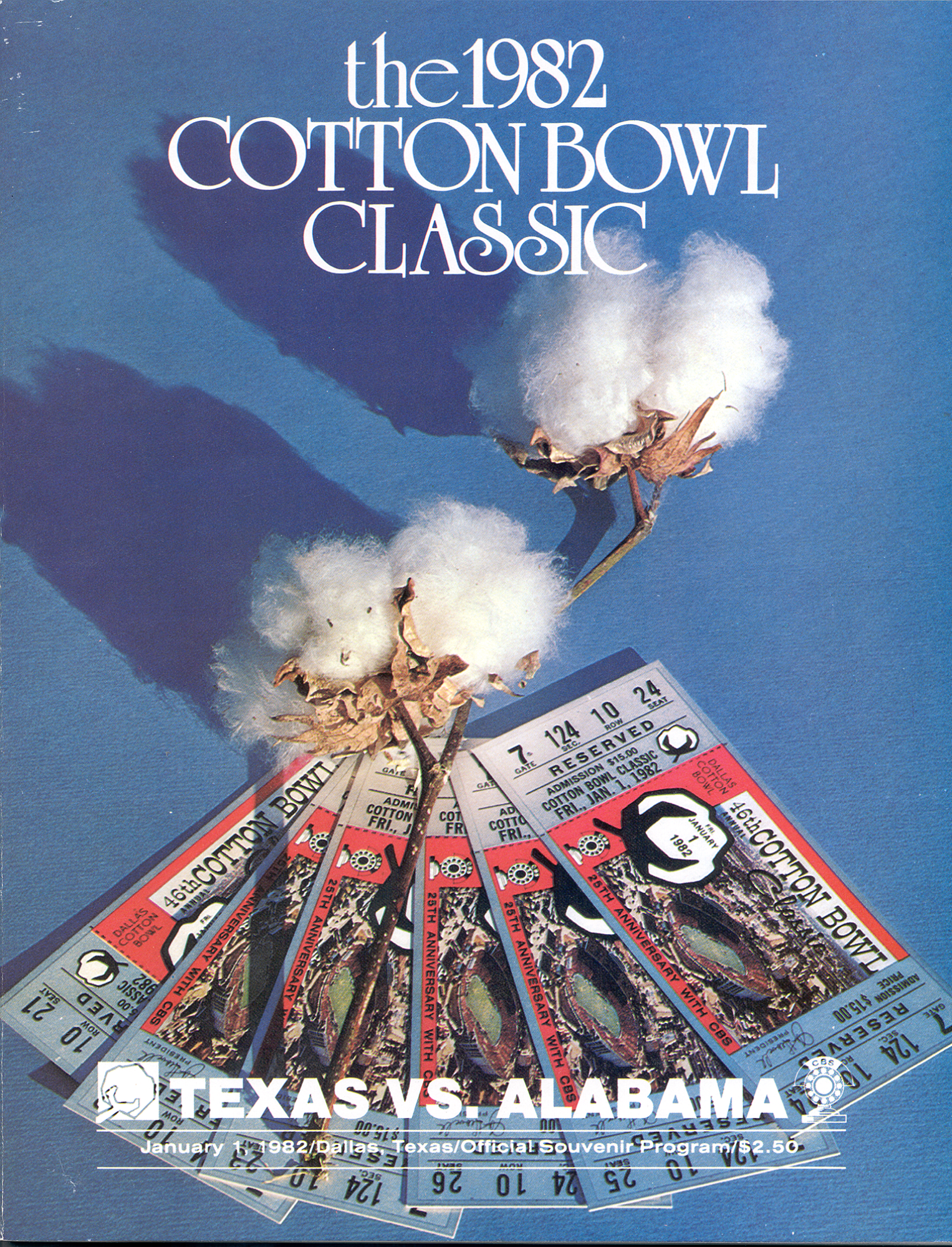
Texas Longhorns	Alabama Crimson Tide
(9–1–1)	(9–1–1)
SWC	SEC
14	12
Head coach: Fred Akers	Head coach: Bear Bryant
AP / Coaches; 6 / 5	AP / Coaches; 3 / 3
	1	2	3	4	Total
Texas	0	0	0	14	14
Alabama	0	7	0	5	12
- Date: January 1, 1982
- Season: 1981
- Stadium: Cotton Bowl
- Location: Dallas, Texas
- MVP: Robert Brewer (Texas QB); Robbie Jones (Alabama LB)
- Favorite: Alabama by 1½ points
- Referee: Donald Safrit (ACC)
- Attendance: 73,243

United States TV coverage
- Network: CBS
- Announcers: Lindsey Nelson, Roger Staubach

The Cotton Bowl in Dallas, Texas, hosted the Cotton Bowl Classic.

The 1982 Cotton Bowl Classic was the 46th edition of the college football bowl game, played at the Cotton Bowl in Dallas, Texas, on Friday, January 1. Part of the 1981–82 bowl game season, it matched the third-ranked Alabama Crimson Tide of the Southeastern Conference (SEC) and the #6 Texas Longhorns of the Southwest Conference (SWC). Down by ten points, slight underdog Texas rallied in the fourth quarter to win, 14–12.

== Teams ==
Both teams entered the matchup with identical 9–1–1 records.

=== Texas ===
The Longhorns were ranked #1 entering their fifth game of the season, but they lost to Arkansas, and a tie to Houston three weeks later knocked them out of serious championship contention.

=== Alabama ===
Alabama was co-champion of the Southeastern Conference who had been ranked #2 after their first game, but a loss to Georgia Tech and a tie four weeks later knocked them out of contention, though they won the SEC title due to them having a perfect SEC record along with Georgia. Their win over Auburn the previous game gave Bryant his 315th win.

== Game summary ==
Televised by CBS, the game kicked off shortly after 1 p.m. CST, a half hour after the Fiesta Bowl started on NBC.

Trailing 10–0 in the fourth quarter, the Longhorns scored their first points with a quarterback draw by Robert Brewer on a third-and-long with 10:38 remaining. On Texas' next possession, Terry Orr scored from eight yards out to cap an eleven-play, eighty-yard drive to put the Longhorns up 14–10 with 2:05 remaining. Alabama's Joey Jones returned the ensuing kickoff to the Texas 38-yard line, and Alabama quarterback Walter Lewis took over with 1:54 left. On the very next play, UT's William Graham picked off a Lewis pass at the one. The Longhorns took a safety to insure better field position and make the final margin 14–12.

=== Scoring ===
First quarter

No scoring

Second quarter

- Alabama - Jesse Bendross 6-yard pass from Walter Lewis (Peter Kim kick)

Third quarter

No scoring

Fourth quarter

- Alabama - Kim 24-yard field goal
- Texas - Robert Brewer 30-yard run (Raul Allegre kick)
- Texas - Terry Orr 8-yard run (Allegre kick)
- Alabama - Safety, punter John Goodson downed ball in the end zone

== Statistics ==
Statistics	Texas	Alabama
First downs	21	15
Rushes–yards	52–158	44–163
Passing yards	201	144
Passes	12–22–0	8–13–1
Total offense	74–359	57–307
Punts–average	6–36	5–45
Fumbles–lost	0–0	1–1
Turnovers	0	2
Penalties–yards	4–17	1–5

== Aftermath ==
Texas climbed to second in the final AP poll, while Alabama fell to seventh.
