= 1981 Ole Miss Rebels football team =

American college football season

1981 Ole Miss Rebels football
- Conference: Southeastern Conference
- Record: 4–6–1 (1–5–1 SEC)
- Head coach: Steve Sloan (4th season)
- Offensive coordinator: John Cropp (4th season)
- Defensive coordinator: Bill Canty (1st season)
- Home stadium: Hemingway Stadium; Mississippi Veterans Memorial Stadium

1981 Southeastern Conference football standings
| | Conf. | | | | | Overall |
| Team | W | | L | | T | W | | L | | T |
|---|---|---|---|---|---|---|---|---|---|---|
| No. 6 Georgia + | 6 | – | 0 | – | 0 | 10 | – | 2 | – | 0 |
| No. 7 Alabama + | 6 | – | 0 | – | 0 | 9 | – | 2 | – | 1 |
| Mississippi State | 4 | – | 2 | – | 0 | 8 | – | 4 | – | 0 |
| Tennessee | 3 | – | 3 | – | 0 | 8 | – | 4 | – | 0 |
| Florida | 3 | – | 3 | – | 0 | 7 | – | 5 | – | 0 |
| Auburn | 2 | – | 4 | – | 0 | 5 | – | 6 | – | 0 |
| Kentucky | 2 | – | 4 | – | 0 | 3 | – | 8 | – | 0 |
| Ole Miss | 1 | – | 4 | – | 1 | 4 | – | 6 | – | 1 |
| LSU | 1 | – | 4 | – | 1 | 3 | – | 7 | – | 1 |
| Vanderbilt | 1 | – | 5 | – | 0 | 4 | – | 7 | – | 0 |
+ – Conference co-champions; Rankings from AP Poll

The 1981 Ole Miss Rebels football team represented the University of Mississippi as a member of the Southeastern Conference (SEC) during the 1981 NCAA Division I-A football season. Le by fourth-year head coach Steve Sloan, the Rebels compiled an overall record of 4–6–1 with a mark of 1–5–1 in conference play, placing ninth in the SEC The season opened with a close win over Tulane.

== Schedule ==
| Date | Opponent | Site | Result | Attendance | Source |
|---|---|---|---|---|---|
| September 5 | at Tulane* | Louisiana Superdome; New Orleans, LA (rivalry) | W 19–18 | 43,685 | |
| September 12 | at South Carolina* | Williams–Brice Stadium; Columbia, SC | W 20–13 | 56,424 | |
| September 19 | at Memphis State* | Liberty Bowl Memorial Stadium; Memphis, TN (rivalry) | W 7–3 | 53,170 | |
| September 26 | Arkansas* | Mississippi Veterans Memorial Stadium; Jackson, MS (rivalry) | L 13–27 | 63,522 | |
| October 3 | at No. 11 Alabama (Note: Prior to the 1980 season, the SEC ruled if two SEC teams scheduled each other independently, and not through the conference office, the game would not count in SEC standings. As such, although both were members of the SEC, the Alabama–Ole Miss games in 1980 and 1981 did not count as conference games in the official SEC standings.)* | Bryant–Denny Stadium; Tuscaloosa, AL (rivalry) | L 7–38 | 60,210 | |
| October 10 | No. 11 Georgia | Hemingway Stadium; Oxford, MS | L 7–37 | 41,125 | |
| October 17 | at Florida | Florida Field; Gainesville, FL | L 3–49 | 64,126 | |
| October 24 | Vanderbilt | Hemingway Stadium; Oxford, MS (rivalry) | L 23–27 | 37,426 | |
| October 31 | LSU | Mississippi Veterans Memorial Stadium; Jackson, MS (rivalry) | T 27–27 | 46,324 | |
| November 14 | at Tennessee | Neyland Stadium; Knoxville, TN (rivalry) | L 20–28 | 90,955 | |
| November 21 | vs. Mississippi State | Mississippi Veterans Memorial Stadium; Jackson, MS (Egg Bowl) | W 21–17 | 61,153 | |
*Non-conference game; Rankings from AP Poll released prior to the game

== Roster ==
1981 Ole Miss Rebels football team roster
| Players | | | Coaches |
|---|---|---|---|
| Offense: Pos. / # / Name / Class; QB / 1 / John Fourcade / Sr | Defense: Pos. / # / Name / Class | Special teams: Pos. / # / Name / Class | Head coach: Steve Sloan; Coordinators/assistant coaches Legend: (C) Team captain; (S) Suspended; (I) Ineligible; Injured; Redshirt |
