= 1981 Duke Blue Devils football team =

American college football season

1981 Duke Blue Devils football
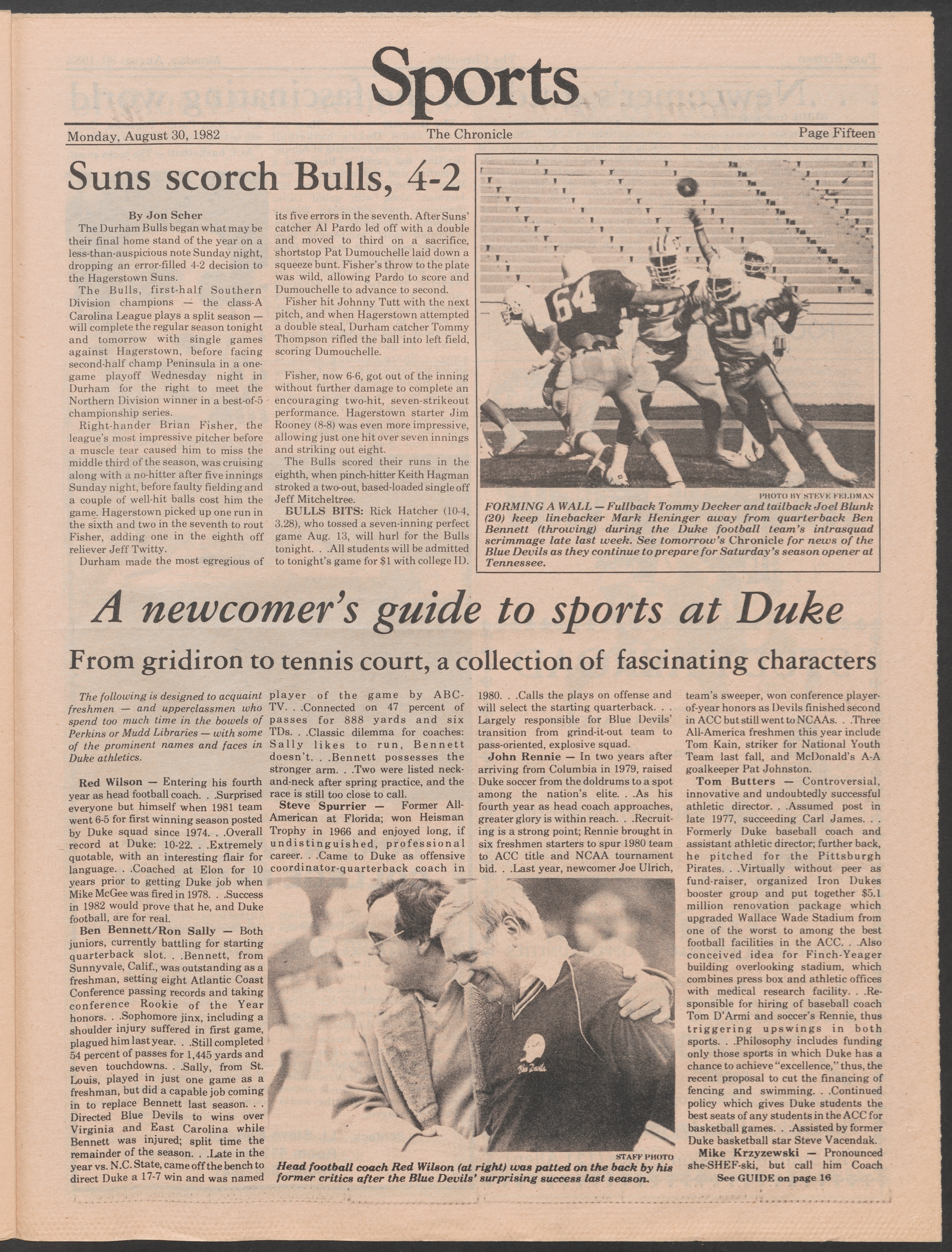
- A page from The Chronicle, the student newspaper of Duke University
- Conference: Atlantic Coast Conference
- Record: 6–5 (3–3 ACC)
- Head coach: Shirley Wilson (3rd season)
- Offensive coordinator: Steve Spurrier (2nd season)
- Offensive scheme: Air Ball
- Defensive coordinator: Dick Hopkins (1st season)
- Base defense: 4–3
- MVP: Cedric Jones
- Captains: Greg Bamberger; Cedric Jones; Dennis Tabron; Dan Yellott
- Home stadium: Wallace Wade Stadium

1981 Atlantic Coast Conference football standings
	Conf.					Overall
Team	W		L		T	W		L		T
No. 1 Clemson $	6	–	0	–	0	12	–	0	–	0
No. 9 North Carolina	5	–	1	–	0	10	–	2	–	0
Maryland	4	–	2	–	0	4	–	6	–	1
Duke	3	–	3	–	0	6	–	5	–	0
NC State	2	–	4	–	0	4	–	7	–	0
Wake Forest	1	–	5	–	0	4	–	7	–	0
Virginia	0	–	6	–	0	1	–	10	–	0
$ – Conference champion; Rankings from AP Poll

The 1981 Duke Blue Devils football team was an American football team that represented Duke University as a member of the Atlantic Coast Conference (ACC) during the 1981 NCAA Division I-A football season. In their third year under head coach Shirley Wilson, the Blue Devils compiled an overall record of 6–5, with a conference record of 3–3, and finished fourth in the ACC. Duke's offense became the first in ACC history to average over 300 yards a game passing.

== Schedule ==
Date	Time	Opponent	Site	Result	Attendance	Source
September 12		at No. 11 Ohio State*	Ohio Stadium; Columbus, OH	L 13–34	86,266	
September 19		at South Carolina*	Williams–Brice Stadium; Columbia, SC	L 3–17	56,321	
September 26		at Virginia	Scott Stadium; Charlottesville, VA	W 29–24	27,523	
October 3		East Carolina*	Wallace Wade Stadium; Durham, NC	W 24–14	18,250	
October 10	1:30 p.m.	Virginia Tech*	Wallace Wade Stadium; Durham, NC	W 14–7	32,000	
October 17		No. 6 Clemson^{†}	Wallace Wade Stadium; Durham, NC	L 10–38	26,000	
October 24		at Maryland	Byrd Stadium; College Park, MD	L 21–24	31,800	
October 31		at Georgia Tech*	Grant Field; Atlanta, GA	W 38–24	30,232	
November 7		at Wake Forest	Groves Stadium; Winston-Salem, NC (rivalry)	W 31–10	22,000	
November 14		NC State	Wallace Wade Stadium; Durham, NC (rivalry)	W 17–7	26,750	
November 21		No. 12 North Carolina	Wallace Wade Stadium; Durham, NC (Victory Bell)	L 10–31	38,525	
*Non-conference game; ^{†}Homecoming; Rankings from AP Poll released prior to the game; All times are in Eastern time

== Personnel ==
1981 Duke Blue Devils football team roster
Players
Coaches
Offense

Pos.	#	Name	Class
QB	14	Ben Bennett	So
WR		Chris Castor
TE		Carl Franks
WR		Mark Militello

Defense

Pos.	#	Name	Class

Special teams

Pos.	#	Name	Class

Head coach

- Shirley Wilson

Coordinators/assistant coaches

- Steve Spurrier (OC)
- Dick Hopkins (DC/DB)
- Rod Broadway (DL)

Legend

- (C) Team captain
- (S) Suspended
- (I) Ineligible
- Injured
- Redshirt

== Awards and honors ==
- Chris Castor, ACC Offensive Player of the Year
