= 1981 NC State Wolfpack football team =

American college football season

1981 NC State Wolfpack football
- Conference: Atlantic Coast Conference
- Record: 4–7 (2–4 ACC)
- Head coach: Monte Kiffin (2nd season)
- Home stadium: Carter Stadium

1981 Atlantic Coast Conference football standings
| | Conf. | | | | | Overall |
| Team | W | | L | | T | W | | L | | T |
|---|---|---|---|---|---|---|---|---|---|---|
| No. 1 Clemson $ | 6 | – | 0 | – | 0 | 12 | – | 0 | – | 0 |
| No. 9 North Carolina | 5 | – | 1 | – | 0 | 10 | – | 2 | – | 0 |
| Maryland | 4 | – | 2 | – | 0 | 4 | – | 6 | – | 1 |
| Duke | 3 | – | 3 | – | 0 | 6 | – | 5 | – | 0 |
| NC State | 2 | – | 4 | – | 0 | 4 | – | 7 | – | 0 |
| Wake Forest | 1 | – | 5 | – | 0 | 4 | – | 7 | – | 0 |
| Virginia | 0 | – | 6 | – | 0 | 1 | – | 10 | – | 0 |
$ – Conference champion; Rankings from AP Poll

The 1981 NC State Wolfpack football team represented North Carolina State University during the 1981 NCAA Division I-A football season. The team's head coach was Monte Kiffin. NC State has been a member of the Atlantic Coast Conference (ACC) since the league's inception in 1953. The Wolfpack played its home games in 1981 at Carter–Finley Stadium in Raleigh, North Carolina, which has been NC State football's home stadium since 1966.

== Schedule ==
| Date | Time | Opponent | Site | TV | Result | Attendance | Source |
|---|---|---|---|---|---|---|---|
| September 5 | | Richmond* | Carter–Finley Stadium; Raleigh, NC | | W 27–21 | 40,400 | |
| September 12 | | at Wake Forest | Groves Stadium; Winston-Salem, NC (rivalry) | | W 28–23 | 29,000 | |
| September 19 | | East Carolina* | Carter–Finley Stadium; Raleigh, NC (rivalry) | | W 31–10 | 52,200 | |
| September 26 | | Maryland | Carter–Finley Stadium; Raleigh, NC | | L 9–34 | 47,500 | |
| October 3 | | Virginia | Carter–Finley Stadium; Raleigh, NC | | W 30–24 | 42,200 | |
| October 17 | | No. 4 North Carolina | Carter–Finley Stadium; Raleigh, NC (rivalry) | | L 10–21 | 56,200 | |
| October 24 | 1:00 p.m. | at No. 4 Clemson | Memorial Stadium; Clemson, SC (rivalry) | | L 7–17 | 62,727 | |
| October 31 | | at South Carolina* | Williams–Brice Stadium; Columbia, SC | ABC | L 12–20 | 56,517 | |
| November 7 | | No. 6 Penn State* | Carter–Finley Stadium; Raleigh, NC | | L 15–22 | 48,800 | |
| November 14 | | at Duke | Wallace Wade Stadium; Durham, NC (rivalry) | | L 7–17 | 26,750 | |
| November 21 | | No. 11 Miami (FL)* | Carter–Finley Stadium; Raleigh, NC | | L 6–14 | 36,500 | |
*Non-conference game; Rankings from AP Poll released prior to the game; All times are in Eastern time

== Roster ==
1981 NC State Wolfpack football team roster
Players
Coaches
Offense

| Pos. | # | Name | Class |
|---|---|---|---|
| OT | 70 | Todd Eckerson | Sr |
| RB | 43 | Joe McIntosh | Fr |
| WR | 22 | Mike Quick | Sr |
| FB | 46 | Dwight Sullivan | Sr |

Defense

| Pos. | # | Name | Class |
|---|---|---|---|
| LB | 53 | Robert Abraham | Sr |
| LB | 33 | Vaughan Johnson | So |
| DB | 6 | Eric Williams | Jr |
| DB | 29 | Perry Williams | Jr |

Special teams

| Pos. | # | Name | Class |

Head coach

- Monte Kiffin

Coordinators/assistant coaches

Legend

- (C) Team captain
- (S) Suspended
- (I) Ineligible
- Injured
- Redshirt
