= 1981 Virginia Cavaliers football team =

American college football season

1981 Virginia Cavaliers football
- Conference: Atlantic Coast Conference
- Record: 1–10 (0–6 ACC)
- Head coach: Dick Bestwick (6th season)
- Captains: Keith Lee; Todd Kirtley
- Home stadium: Scott Stadium

1981 Atlantic Coast Conference football standings
	Conf.					Overall
Team	W		L		T	W		L		T
No. 1 Clemson $	6	–	0	–	0	12	–	0	–	0
No. 9 North Carolina	5	–	1	–	0	10	–	2	–	0
Maryland	4	–	2	–	0	4	–	6	–	1
Duke	3	–	3	–	0	6	–	5	–	0
NC State	2	–	4	–	0	4	–	7	–	0
Wake Forest	1	–	5	–	0	4	–	7	–	0
Virginia	0	–	6	–	0	1	–	10	–	0
$ – Conference champion; Rankings from AP Poll

The 1981 Virginia Cavaliers football team represented the University of Virginia during the 1981 NCAA Division I-A football season. The Cavaliers were led by sixth-year head coach Dick Bestwick and played their home games at Scott Stadium in Charlottesville, Virginia. They competed as members of the Atlantic Coast Conference, finishing in last. At the conclusion of a 1–10 campaign, Bestwick was fired. He had a record of 16–49–1 at Virginia.

== Schedule ==
Date	Time	Opponent	Site	Result	Attendance	Source
September 12	1:30 p.m.	West Virginia*	Scott Stadium; Charlottesville, VA	L 18–32	34,007	
September 18	7:30 p.m.	at Rutgers*	Giants Stadium; East Rutherford, NJ	L 0–3	22,816	
September 26	1:30 p.m.	Duke	Scott Stadium; Charlottesville, VA	L 24–29	27,523	
October 3	1:00 p.m.	at NC State	Carter–Finley Stadium; Raleigh, NC	L 24–30	42,200	
October 10	1:00 p.m.	at No. 9 Clemson	Memorial Stadium; Clemson, SC	L 0–27	63,000	
October 17	7:00 p.m.	at South Carolina*	Williams–Brice Stadium; Columbia, SC	L 3–21	56,101	
October 24	1:30 p.m.	Wake Forest^{†}	Scott Stadium; Charlottesville, VA	L 21–24	24,222	
October 31	1:30 p.m.	VMI*	Scott Stadium; Charlottesville, VA	W 13–10	25,119	
November 14	1:30 p.m.	No. 13 North Carolina	Scott Stadium; Charlottesville, VA (South's Oldest Rivalry)	L 14–17	30,047	
November 21	1:30 p.m.	at Maryland	Byrd Stadium; College Park, MD (rivalry)	L 7–48	21,300	
November 28	1:30 p.m.	Virginia Tech*	Scott Stadium; Charlottesville, VA (rivalry)	L 3–20	39,027	
*Non-conference game; ^{†}Homecoming; Rankings from AP Poll released prior to the game

== Roster ==
1981 Virginia Cavaliers football team roster
Players			Coaches
Offense: Pos. / # / Name / Class; TE / 87 / Billy Griggs / So	Defense: Pos. / # / Name / Class; DT / 99 / Stuart Anderson / Sr	Special teams: Pos. / # / Name / Class	Head coach: Dick Bestwick; Coordinators/assistant coaches Legend: (C) Team captain; (S) Suspended; (I) Ineligible; Injured; Redshirt
