= 1981 Kentucky Wildcats football team =

American college football season

1981 Kentucky Wildcats football
- Conference: Southeastern Conference
- Record: 3–8 (2–4 SEC)
- Head coach: Fran Curci (9th season)
- Home stadium: Commonwealth Stadium

1981 Southeastern Conference football standings
| | Conf. | | | | | Overall |
| Team | W | | L | | T | W | | L | | T |
|---|---|---|---|---|---|---|---|---|---|---|
| No. 6 Georgia + | 6 | – | 0 | – | 0 | 10 | – | 2 | – | 0 |
| No. 7 Alabama + | 6 | – | 0 | – | 0 | 9 | – | 2 | – | 1 |
| Mississippi State | 4 | – | 2 | – | 0 | 8 | – | 4 | – | 0 |
| Tennessee | 3 | – | 3 | – | 0 | 8 | – | 4 | – | 0 |
| Florida | 3 | – | 3 | – | 0 | 7 | – | 5 | – | 0 |
| Auburn | 2 | – | 4 | – | 0 | 5 | – | 6 | – | 0 |
| Kentucky | 2 | – | 4 | – | 0 | 3 | – | 8 | – | 0 |
| Ole Miss | 1 | – | 4 | – | 1 | 4 | – | 6 | – | 1 |
| LSU | 1 | – | 4 | – | 1 | 3 | – | 7 | – | 1 |
| Vanderbilt | 1 | – | 5 | – | 0 | 4 | – | 7 | – | 0 |
+ – Conference co-champions; Rankings from AP Poll

The 1981 Kentucky Wildcats football team represented the University of Kentucky in the Southeastern Conference (SEC) during the 1981 NCAA Division I-A football season. In their ninth and final season under head coach Fran Curci, the Wildcats compiled a 3–8 record (2–4 against SEC opponents), finished in a tie for sixth place in the SEC, and were outscored by their opponents, 224 to 134. The team played its home games in Commonwealth Stadium in Lexington, Kentucky.

The team's statistical leaders included Randy Jenkins with 1,079 passing yards, Lawrence Lee with 275 rushing yards, and Rick Massie with 448 receiving yards.

At the end of November 1981, Curci was fired by the University of Kentucky. The decision followed four losing seasons, arrests of 18 players from 1978 to 1981, and recruiting violations that resulted in the program being placed on probation.

== Schedule ==
| Date | Opponent | Site | Result | Attendance | Source |
|---|---|---|---|---|---|
| September 5 | North Texas State* | Commonwealth Stadium; Lexington, KY | W 28–6 | 55,262 | |
| September 19 | No. 12 Alabama | Commonwealth Stadium; Lexington, KY | L 10–19 | 57,960 | |
| September 26 | at Kansas* | Memorial Stadium; Lawrence, KS | L 16–21 | 40,200 | |
| October 3 | No. 14 Clemson* | Commonwealth Stadium; Lexington, KY | L 3–21 | 57,453 | |
| October 10 | South Carolina* | Commonwealth Stadium; Lexington, KY | L 14–28 | 57,553 | |
| October 17 | at LSU | Tiger Stadium; Baton Rouge, LA | L 10–24 | 69,169 | |
| October 24 | at No. 7 Georgia | Sanford Stadium; Athens, GA | L 0–21 | 80,780 | |
| October 31 | Virginia Tech* | Commonwealth Stadium; Lexington, KY | L 3–29 | 54,500 | |
| November 7 | at Vanderbilt | Vanderbilt Stadium; Nashville, TN (rivalry) | W 17–10 | 40,250 | |
| November 14 | at Florida | Florida Field; Gainesville, FL (rivalry) | L 12–33 | 60,286 | |
| November 21 | Tennessee | Commonwealth Stadium; Lexington, KY (rivalry) | W 21–10 | 54,604 | |
*Non-conference game; Rankings from AP Poll released prior to the game

== Roster ==
1981 Kentucky Wildcats football team roster
Players
Coaches
Offense

| Pos. | # | Name | Class |
|---|---|---|---|
| [[American football positions|]] |
| [[American football positions|]] |

Defense

| Pos. | # | Name | Class |
|---|---|---|---|
| [[American football positions|]] |

Special teams

| Pos. | # | Name | Class |

Head coach

Coordinators/assistant coaches

Legend

- (C) Team captain
- (S) Suspended
- (I) Ineligible
- Injured
- Redshirt
