= 1981 Vanderbilt Commodores football team =

American college football season

1981 Vanderbilt Commodores football
- Conference: Southeastern Conference
- Record: 4–7 (1–5 SEC)
- Head coach: George MacIntyre (3rd season)
- Offensive coordinator: Watson Brown (1st season)
- Defensive coordinator: Ron McCrone (3rd season)
- Home stadium: Vanderbilt Stadium

1981 Southeastern Conference football standings
	Conf.					Overall
Team	W		L		T	W		L		T
No. 6 Georgia +	6	–	0	–	0	10	–	2	–	0
No. 7 Alabama +	6	–	0	–	0	9	–	2	–	1
Mississippi State	4	–	2	–	0	8	–	4	–	0
Tennessee	3	–	3	–	0	8	–	4	–	0
Florida	3	–	3	–	0	7	–	5	–	0
Auburn	2	–	4	–	0	5	–	6	–	0
Kentucky	2	–	4	–	0	3	–	8	–	0
Ole Miss	1	–	4	–	1	4	–	6	–	1
LSU	1	–	4	–	1	3	–	7	–	1
Vanderbilt	1	–	5	–	0	4	–	7	–	0
+ – Conference co-champions; Rankings from AP Poll

The 1981 Vanderbilt Commodores football team represented Vanderbilt University in the 1981 NCAA Division I-A football season. The Commodores were led by head coach George MacIntyre in his third season and finished the season with a record of four wins and seven losses (4–7 overall, 1–5 in the SEC).

== Schedule ==
Date	Opponent	Site	TV	Result	Attendance	Source
September 12	Maryland*	Vanderbilt Stadium; Nashville, TN		W 23–17	38,624	
September 19	at No. 14 Mississippi State	Scott Field; Starkville, MS		L 9–29	32,045	
September 26	No. 10 Alabama	Vanderbilt Stadium; Nashville, TN		L 7–28	41,000	
October 3	at No. 17 Miami (FL)*	Miami Orange Bowl; Miami, FL		L 16–48	27,654	
October 10	at Tulane*	Louisiana Superdome; New Orleans, LA		L 10–14	32,431	
October 17	No. 9 Georgia	Vanderbilt Stadium; Nashville, TN (rivalry)	ABC	L 21–53	39,657	
October 24	at Ole Miss	Hemingway Stadium; Oxford, MS (rivalry)		W 27–23	37,426	
October 31	Memphis State*	Vanderbilt Stadium; Nashville, TN		W 26–0	33,285	
November 7	Kentucky	Vanderbilt Stadium; Nashville, TN (rivalry)		L 10–17	40,250	
November 21	Chattanooga*	Vanderbilt Stadium; Nashville, TN		W 28–14	26,241	
November 28	at Tennessee	Neyland Stadium; Knoxville, TN (rivalry)		L 34–38	92,824	
*Non-conference game; Rankings from AP Poll released prior to the game

== Roster ==
1981 Vanderbilt Commodores football team roster
Players
Coaches
Offense

Pos.	#	Name	Class
RB		Jim Bronner
QB		Whit Taylor	Jr

Defense

Pos.	#	Name	Class
DL		Steve Bearden	Jr
DB		Rob Vaughn	Sr
DB		Leonard Coleman	Jr
DL		Willie Twyford	So

Special teams

Pos.	#	Name	Class

Head coach

- George MacIntyre

Coordinators/assistant coaches

Legend

- (C) Team captain
- (S) Suspended
- (I) Ineligible
- Injured
- Redshirt
