= 1981 Maryland Terrapins football team =

American college football season

1981 Maryland Terrapins football
- Conference: Atlantic Coast Conference
- Record: 4–6–1 (4–2 ACC)
- Head coach: Jerry Claiborne (10th season)
- Home stadium: Byrd Stadium

1981 Atlantic Coast Conference football standings
	Conf.					Overall
Team	W		L		T	W		L		T
No. 1 Clemson $	6	–	0	–	0	12	–	0	–	0
No. 9 North Carolina	5	–	1	–	0	10	–	2	–	0
Maryland	4	–	2	–	0	4	–	6	–	1
Duke	3	–	3	–	0	6	–	5	–	0
NC State	2	–	4	–	0	4	–	7	–	0
Wake Forest	1	–	5	–	0	4	–	7	–	0
Virginia	0	–	6	–	0	1	–	10	–	0
$ – Conference champion; Rankings from AP Poll

The 1981 Maryland Terrapins football team represented the University of Maryland in the 1981 NCAA Division I-A football season. In their 10th and final season under head coach Jerry Claiborne, the Terrapins compiled a 4–6–1 record, finished in third place in the Atlantic Coast Conference, and outscored their opponents 232 to 194. The team's statistical leaders included Boomer Esiason with 1,635 passing yards, Charlie Wysocki with 715 rushing yards, and Russell Davis with 498 receiving yards.

== Schedule ==
Date	Time	Opponent	Site	TV	Result	Attendance	Source
September 12		at Vanderbilt*	Vanderbilt Stadium; Nashville, TN		L 17–23	38,624	
September 19		West Virginia*	Byrd Stadium; College Park, MD (rivalry)		L 13–17	38,300	
September 26		at NC State	Carter–Finley Stadium; Raleigh, NC		W 34–9	47,500	
October 3		Syracuse*	Byrd Stadium; College Park, MD		T 17–17	32,000	
October 10		at Florida*	Florida Field; Gainesville, FL		L 10–15	56,319	
October 17		at Wake Forest	Groves Stadium; Winston-Salem, NC		W 45–33	24,500	
October 24		Duke	Byrd Stadium; College Park, MD		W 24–21	31,800	
October 31		No. 9 North Carolina	Byrd Stadium; College Park, MD		L 10–17	32,100	
November 7		at Tulane*	Louisiana Superdome; New Orleans, LA		L 7–14	32,474	
November 14	1:00 p.m.	at No. 2 Clemson	Memorial Stadium; Clemson, SC	USA	L 7–21	63,199	
November 21		Virginia	Byrd Stadium; College Park, MD (rivalry)		W 48–7	21,300	
*Non-conference game; Rankings from AP Poll released prior to the game

== Roster ==
1981 Maryland Terrapins football team roster
Players
Coaches
Offense

Pos.	#	Name	Class
QB	7	Boomer Esiason	So
TE	82	John Tice	Jr

Defense

Pos.	#	Name	Class
DT	79	Pete Koch	So

Special teams

Pos.	#	Name	Class
FB	41	Larry Abraham	Fr

Head coach

- Jerry Claiborne

Coordinators/assistant coaches

Legend

- (C) Team captain
- (S) Suspended
- (I) Ineligible
- Injured
- Redshirt
