= 1981 Wake Forest Demon Deacons football team =

American college football season

1981 Wake Forest Demon Deacons football
- Conference: Atlantic Coast Conference
- Record: 4–7 (1–5 ACC)
- Head coach: Al Groh (1st season)
- Offensive coordinator: Ed Zaunbrecher (2nd season)
- Captain: Game captains
- Home stadium: Groves Stadium

1981 Atlantic Coast Conference football standings
	Conf.					Overall
Team	W		L		T	W		L		T
No. 1 Clemson $	6	–	0	–	0	12	–	0	–	0
No. 9 North Carolina	5	–	1	–	0	10	–	2	–	0
Maryland	4	–	2	–	0	4	–	6	–	1
Duke	3	–	3	–	0	6	–	5	–	0
NC State	2	–	4	–	0	4	–	7	–	0
Wake Forest	1	–	5	–	0	4	–	7	–	0
Virginia	0	–	6	–	0	1	–	10	–	0
$ – Conference champion; Rankings from AP Poll

The 1981 Wake Forest Demon Deacons football team was an American football team that represented Wake Forest University during the 1981 NCAA Division I-A football season. In their first season under head coach Al Groh, the Demon Deacons compiled a 4–7 record and finished in sixth place in the Atlantic Coast Conference.

== Schedule ==
Date	Opponent	Site	Result	Attendance	Source
September 5	South Carolina*	Groves Stadium; Winston-Salem, NC	L 6–23	29,300	
September 12	NC State	Groves Stadium; Winston-Salem, NC (rivalry)	L 23–28	29,000	
September 19	at Auburn*	Jordan–Hare Stadium; Auburn, AL	W 24–21	63,000	
September 26	at Virginia Tech*	Lane Stadium; Blacksburg, VA	L 14–30	42,200	
October 3	Appalachian State*	Groves Stadium; Winston-Salem, NC	W 15–14	24,500	
October 10	at No. 5 North Carolina	Kenan Memorial Stadium; Chapel Hill, NC (rivalry)	L 10–48	51,692	
October 17	Maryland	Groves Stadium; Winston-Salem, NC	L 33–45	24,500	
October 24	at Virginia	Scott Stadium; Charlottesville, VA	W 24–21	24,222	
October 31	at No. 2 Clemson	Memorial Stadium; Clemson, SC	L 24–82	60,383	
November 7	Duke	Wallace Wade Stadium; Durham, NC (rivalry)	L 10–31	22,000	
November 14	at Richmond*	University of Richmond Stadium; Richmond, VA	W 34–22	15,285	
*Non-conference game; Rankings from AP Poll released prior to the game

== Roster ==
1981 Wake Forest Demon Deacons football team roster
Players
Coaches
Offense

Pos.	#	Name	Class
RB	23	Wayne McMillan
WR	88	Tim Ryan

Defense

Pos.	#	Name	Class

Special teams

Pos.	#	Name	Class

Head coach

- Al Groh

Coordinators/assistant coaches

Legend

- (C) Team captain
- (S) Suspended
- (I) Ineligible
- Injured
- Redshirt

== Team leaders ==
Category	Team Leader	Att/Cth	Yds
Passing	Gary Schofield	241/404	2,572
Rushing	Wayne McMillan	90	407
Receiving	Phil Denfeld	51	461
