= 1981 LSU Tigers football team =

American college football season

1981 LSU Tigers football
- Conference: Southeastern Conference
- Record: 3–7–1 (1–4–1 SEC)
- Head coach: Jerry Stovall (2nd season)
- Offensive coordinator: George Belu (3rd season)
- Defensive coordinator: Greg Williams (3rd season)
- Home stadium: Tiger Stadium

1981 Southeastern Conference football standings
	Conf.					Overall
Team	W		L		T	W		L		T
No. 6 Georgia +	6	–	0	–	0	10	–	2	–	0
No. 7 Alabama +	6	–	0	–	0	9	–	2	–	1
Mississippi State	4	–	2	–	0	8	–	4	–	0
Tennessee	3	–	3	–	0	8	–	4	–	0
Florida	3	–	3	–	0	7	–	5	–	0
Auburn	2	–	4	–	0	5	–	6	–	0
Kentucky	2	–	4	–	0	3	–	8	–	0
Ole Miss	1	–	4	–	1	4	–	6	–	1
LSU	1	–	4	–	1	3	–	7	–	1
Vanderbilt	1	–	5	–	0	4	–	7	–	0
+ – Conference co-champions; Rankings from AP Poll

The 1981 LSU Tigers football team represented Louisiana State University (LSU) as a member of the Southeastern Conference (SEC) during the 1981 NCAA Division I-A football season. Led by second-year head coach Jerry Stovall, the Tigers compiled an overall record of 3–7–1, with a mark of 1–4–1 in conference play, and finished eighth in the SEC.

Their 3–7–1 record was their worst since going 3–7 in Paul Dietzel's second season of 1956. This mark for futility has been surpassed twice, 2–9 in 1992 and 3–8 in 1999.

LSU opened its season before Labor Day for the first time in school history, moving its game vs. Alabama from November 7 to September 5 at the request of ABC, which televised the game nationally in prime time. It was Crimson Tide coach Bear Bryant's last visit to Tiger Stadium.

The Tigers' second game, a 27–9 loss at Notre Dame, was Gerry Faust's inaugural outing as Fighting Irish coach. LSU returned to South Bend four years later and defeated Notre Dame 10–7 in what turned out to be Faust's last game at Notre Dame Stadium.

LSU's 48–7 loss to in-state rival Tulane was its second largest margin of defeat in the series, eclipsed only by a 46–0 shutout at home in 1948.

Following the season, Stovall fired defensive coordinator Greg Williams. Defensive line coach Pete Jenkins was promoted to coordinator.

Dietzel was fired as LSU's athletic director on February 5, 1982 after Chancellor James Wharton learned of gross financial mismanagement within the athletic department. Bob Brodhead was hired from the Miami Dolphins as his successor on June 1.

== Schedule ==
Date	Opponent	Site	TV	Result	Attendance	Source
September 5	No. 4 Alabama	Tiger Stadium; Baton Rouge, LA (rivalry)	ABC	L 7–24	78,066	
September 12	at No. 4 Notre Dame*	Notre Dame Stadium; Notre Dame, IN	Mizlou	L 9–27	59,075	
September 19	Oregon State*	Tiger Stadium; Baton Rouge, LA		W 27–24	74,962	
September 26	Rice*	Tiger Stadium; Baton Rouge, LA		W 28–14	71,869	
October 3	Florida	Tiger Stadium; Baton Rouge, LA (rivalry)		L 10–24	73,665	
October 10	at Auburn	Jordan-Hare Stadium; Auburn, AL (rivalry)		L 7–19	61,000	
October 17	Kentucky	Tiger Stadium; Baton Rouge, LA		W 24–10	69,169	
October 24	No. 20 Florida State*^{†}	Tiger Stadium; Baton Rouge, LA		L 14–38	74,816	
October 31	at Ole Miss	Mississippi Veterans Memorial Stadium; Jackson, MS (rivalry)		T 27–27	46,324	
November 14	Mississippi State	Tiger Stadium; Baton Rouge, LA (rivalry)		L 9–17	71,303	
November 28	at Tulane*	Louisiana Superdome; New Orleans, LA (Battle for the Rag)		L 7–48	71,546	
*Non-conference game; ^{†}Homecoming; Rankings from AP Poll released prior to the game

== Roster ==
1981 LSU Tigers football team roster
Players
Coaches
Offense

Pos.	#	Name	Class
QB	7	Alan Risher	Jr
WR	32	Orlando McDaniel	Sr

Defense

Pos.	#	Name	Class
CB	11	James Britt	Sr
LB	28	Sean Moore	Jr
CB	35	Eugene Daniel	So
LB	51	Albert Richardson	So

Special teams

Pos.	#	Name	Class

Head coach

- Jerry Stovall

Coordinators/assistant coaches

- George Belu – Offensive coordinator/offensive line
- Bob Gatling – Quarterbacks
- Darrel Moody – Running backs
- Stephen Regan – Wide receivers
- Greg Williams – Defensive coordinator/defensive backs
- Pete Jenkins – Defensive line
- Bishop Harris – Outside linebackers
- Bobby Morrison – Inside linebackers
- Buddy Nix – Inside linebackers
- Sam Nader – Recruiting coordinator

Legend

- (C) Team captain
- (S) Suspended
- (I) Ineligible
- Injured
- Redshirt

Roster
