= 1981 Hall of Fame Classic =

Kansas Jayhawks	Mississippi State Bulldogs
(8–3)	(7–4)
0	10
Head coach: Don Fambrough	Head coach: Emory Bellard
	1	2	3	4	Total
Kansas	0	0	0	0	0
Mississippi State	7	3	0	0	10
- Date: December 31, 1981
- Season: 1981
- Stadium: Legion Field
- Location: Birmingham, Alabama
- MVP: QB John Bond
- Attendance: 41,672

United States TV coverage
- Network: Mizlou
- Announcers: Merle Harmon, Danny Abramowicz and Howard David

The 1981 Hall of Fame Classic was a college football postseason bowl game between the Mississippi State Bulldogs and the Kansas Jayhawks.

== Background ==
The Bulldogs finished 3rd in the Southeastern Conference. This was the first time in school history that they reached consecutive bowl games. The Jayhawks finished tied for 3rd in the Big Eight Conference, in their first bowl game since 1975.

== Game summary ==
On the first play of the game, the Bulldogs reached upon a stroke of luck. Ricky Green of the Jayhawks was receiving the opening kickoff when Rob Fesmire caused a fumble and recovered it at the Kansas 17. On the next play, John Bond ran 17 yards to the end zone to give the Bulldogs a 7–0 lead early in the game. Dana Moore made it 10–0 on a 22-yard field goal, and those 10 points proved to be all the Bulldogs needed as they held Kansas to 35 yards rushing while forcing three turnovers and using deep punts by Dana Moore to stymie the Jayhawks.

== Aftermath ==
The Bulldogs waited 10 years to reach another bowl game in 1991 while the Jayhawks waited 11 years.

== Statistics ==
Statistics	Mississippi State	Kansas
First downs	12	14
Rushing yards	236	35
Passing yards	51	171
Total yards	287	206
Passes (C–A–I)	5–16–0	15–31–2
Fumbles–lost	5–1	1–1
Penalties–yards	10–65	7–82
