= 1981 Tennessee Volunteers football team =

American college football season

1981 Tennessee Volunteers football

Garden State Bowl champion

Garden State Bowl, W 28–21 vs. Wisconsin
- Conference: Southeastern Conference
- Record: 8–4 (3–3 SEC)
- Head coach: Johnny Majors (5th season)
- Offensive coordinator: Bill Pace (2nd season)
- Defensive coordinator: Bobby Jackson (2nd season)
- Captains: James Berry; Lemont Holt Jeffers; Lee North
- Home stadium: Neyland Stadium

1981 Southeastern Conference football standings
	Conf.					Overall
Team	W		L		T	W		L		T
No. 6 Georgia +	6	–	0	–	0	10	–	2	–	0
No. 7 Alabama +	6	–	0	–	0	9	–	2	–	1
Mississippi State	4	–	2	–	0	8	–	4	–	0
Tennessee	3	–	3	–	0	8	–	4	–	0
Florida	3	–	3	–	0	7	–	5	–	0
Auburn	2	–	4	–	0	5	–	6	–	0
Kentucky	2	–	4	–	0	3	–	8	–	0
Ole Miss	1	–	4	–	1	4	–	6	–	1
LSU	1	–	4	–	1	3	–	7	–	1
Vanderbilt	1	–	5	–	0	4	–	7	–	0
+ – Conference co-champions; Rankings from AP Poll

The 1981 Tennessee Volunteers football team (variously "Tennessee", "UT" or the "Vols") represented the University of Tennessee in the 1981 NCAA Division I-A football season. Playing as a member of the Southeastern Conference (SEC), the team was led by head coach Johnny Majors, in his fifth year, and played their home games at Neyland Stadium in Knoxville, Tennessee. They finished the season with a record of eight wins and four losses (8–4 overall, 3–3 in the SEC). The Volunteers offense scored 244 points while the defense allowed 265 points.

== Schedule ==
Date	Opponent	Site	TV	Result	Attendance	Source
September 5	at No. 10 Georgia	Sanford Stadium; Athens, GA		L 0–44	79,600	
September 12	at No. 5 USC*	Los Angeles Memorial Coliseum; Los Angeles, CA		L 7–43	62,147	
September 19	Colorado State*	Neyland Stadium; Knoxville, TN		W 42–0	93,972	
September 26	Auburn	Neyland Stadium; Knoxville, TN		W 10–7	92,612	
October 10	Georgia Tech*	Neyland Stadium; Knoxville, TN		W 10–7	94,478	
October 17	at No. 15 Alabama	Legion Field; Birmingham, AL (Third Saturday in October)		L 19–38	78,550	
October 24	at Memphis State*	Liberty Bowl Memorial Stadium; Memphis, TN		W 28–9	51,668	
November 7	Wichita State*^{†}	Neyland Stadium; Knoxville, TN		W 24–21	94,155	
November 14	Ole Miss	Neyland Stadium; Knoxville, TN (rivalry)		W 28–20	90,955	
November 21	at Kentucky	Commonwealth Stadium; Lexington, KY (rivalry)		L 10–21	54,604	
November 28	Vanderbilt	Neyland Stadium; Knoxville, TN		W 38–34	92,824	
December 13	vs. Wisconsin*	Giants Stadium; East Rutherford, NJ (Garden State Bowl)	Mizlou	W 28–21	53,220	
*Non-conference game; ^{†}Homecoming; Rankings from AP Poll released prior to the game

== Roster ==
1981 Tennessee Volunteers football team roster
Players
Coaches
Offense

Pos.	#	Name	Class
WR	2	Lenny Taylor	So
QB	6	Alan Cockrell	Fr
WR	24	Clyde Duncan	So
WR	26	Willie Gault	Jr
WR	28	Anthony Hancock	Sr

Defense

Pos.	#	Name	Class
DB	40	Bill Bates	Jr
DE	92	Reggie White	So
DE	93	Mike Cofer	Jr
DE	97	Tony Simmons	Fr

Special teams

Pos.	#	Name	Class
K	4	Fuad Reveiz	Fr

Head coach

- Johnny Majors

Coordinators/assistant coaches

- Bill Pace – Offensive coordinator/quarterbacks/assistant head coach
- Doug Mathews – Running backs
- Bob Harrison – Wide receivers
- Phillip Fulmer – Offensive line
- Bobby Jackson – Defensive coordinator/linebackers
- Frank Emanuel – Defensive line
- John Julies – Defensive ends
- Dom Capers – Defensive backs

Legend

- (C) Team captain
- (S) Suspended
- (I) Ineligible
- Injured
- Redshirt

Roster

== Game summaries ==
=== At USC ===
Tennessee at USC

Team	1	2	3	4	Total
Volunteers	0	0	7	0	7
• Trojans	6	20	10	7	43

- Date: September 12
- Location: Los Angeles Memorial Coliseum, Los Angeles
- Game attendance: 62,147

Scoring summary
Q1	USC	Allen 9-yard run (kick failed)	USC 6–0
Q2	USC	White 50-yard pass from Mazur (run failed)	USC 12–0
Q2	USC	Allen 12-yard run (Livingston kick)	USC 19–0
Q2	USC	Allen 4-yard run (Livingston kick)	USC 26–0
Q3	USC	Allen 55-yard run (Livingston kick)	USC 33–0
Q3	USC	Livingston 47-yard field goal	USC 36–0
Q3	TEN	Morris 1-yard pass from Cockrell (Reveiz kick)	USC 36–7
Q4	USC	Boyer 3-yard pass from Salisbury (Jordan kick)	USC 43–7

== Team players drafted into the NFL ==
Player	Position	Round	Pick	NFL club
Anthony Hancock	Wide Receiver	1	11	Kansas City Chiefs
Brian Ingram	Linebacker	4	111	New England Patriots
LeMont Holt Jeffers	Linebacker	6	153	Washington Redskins
Terry Daniels		10	265	Washington Redskins
