= 1981 Auburn Tigers football team =

American college football season

1981 Auburn Tigers football
- Conference: Southeastern Conference
- Record: 5–6 (2–4 SEC)
- Head coach: Pat Dye (1st season)
- Offensive scheme: Wishbone
- Defensive coordinator: Frank Orgel (1st season)
- Home stadium: Jordan-Hare Stadium

1981 Southeastern Conference football standings
| | Conf. | | | | | Overall |
| Team | W | | L | | T | W | | L | | T |
|---|---|---|---|---|---|---|---|---|---|---|
| No. 6 Georgia + | 6 | – | 0 | – | 0 | 10 | – | 2 | – | 0 |
| No. 7 Alabama + | 6 | – | 0 | – | 0 | 9 | – | 2 | – | 1 |
| Mississippi State | 4 | – | 2 | – | 0 | 8 | – | 4 | – | 0 |
| Tennessee | 3 | – | 3 | – | 0 | 8 | – | 4 | – | 0 |
| Florida | 3 | – | 3 | – | 0 | 7 | – | 5 | – | 0 |
| Auburn | 2 | – | 4 | – | 0 | 5 | – | 6 | – | 0 |
| Kentucky | 2 | – | 4 | – | 0 | 3 | – | 8 | – | 0 |
| Ole Miss | 1 | – | 4 | – | 1 | 4 | – | 6 | – | 1 |
| LSU | 1 | – | 4 | – | 1 | 3 | – | 7 | – | 1 |
| Vanderbilt | 1 | – | 5 | – | 0 | 4 | – | 7 | – | 0 |
+ – Conference co-champions; Rankings from AP Poll

The 1981 Auburn Tigers football team represented Auburn University in the NCAA Division I college football season of 1981. Competing as a member of the Southeastern Conference (SEC), the team was led by head coach Pat Dye, in his first year, and played their home games at Jordan–Hare Stadium in Auburn, Alabama. They finished the season with a record of 5–6 (2–4 in the SEC).

== Schedule ==
| Date | Opponent | Site | TV | Result | Attendance | Source |
|---|---|---|---|---|---|---|
| September 5 | TCU* | Jordan-Hare Stadium; Auburn, AL | | W 24–16 | 48,000 | |
| September 19 | Wake Forest* | Jordan-Hare Stadium; Auburn, AL | | L 21–24 | 63,000 | |
| September 26 | at Tennessee | Neyland Stadium; Knoxville, TN (rivalry) | | L 7–10 | 92,612 | |
| October 3 | at Nebraska* | Memorial Stadium; Lincoln, NE | | L 3–17 | 76,423 | |
| October 10 | LSU | Jordan-Hare Stadium; Auburn, AL (rivalry) | | W 19–7 | 61,000 | |
| October 17 | at Georgia Tech* | Grant Field; Atlanta, GA (rivalry) | | W 31–7 | 50,263–50,326 | |
| October 24 | No. 9 Mississippi State | Jordan-Hare Stadium; Auburn, AL | | L 17–21 | 58,000 | |
| October 31 | Florida | Jordan-Hare Stadium; Auburn, AL (rivalry) | | W 14–12 | 65,000 | |
| November 7 | North Texas State*^{†} | Jordan-Hare Stadium; Auburn, AL | | W 20–0 | 63,000 | |
| November 14 | at No. 4 Georgia | Sanford Stadium; Athens, GA (rivalry) | | L 13–24 | 82,165 | |
| November 28 | vs. No. 4 Alabama | Legion Field; Birmingham, AL (Iron Bowl) | ABC | L 17–28 | 78,170 | |
*Non-conference game; ^{†}Homecoming; Rankings from AP Poll released prior to the game

== Personnel ==
1981 Auburn Tigers football team roster
Players
Coaches
Offense

| Pos. | # | Name | Class |
|---|---|---|---|
| QB | | Ken Hobby |
| QB | 5 | Joe Sullivan | Jr |
| RB | 6 | Lionel James | So |
| QB | 11 | Mike Mann | So |

Defense

| Pos. | # | Name | Class |
|---|---|---|---|
| NT | 61 | Dowe Aughtman | So |

Special teams

| Pos. | # | Name | Class |
|---|---|---|---|
| K | 3 | Al Del Greco | So |

Head coach

- Pat Dye

Coordinators/assistant coaches

- Frank Orgel and Alex Gibbs

Legend

- (C) Team captain
- (S) Suspended
- (I) Ineligible
- Injured
- Redshirt

Roster
