= 1981 North Carolina Tar Heels football team =

American college football season

1981 North Carolina Tar Heels football

Gator Bowl champion

Gator Bowl, W 31–27 vs. Arkansas
- Conference: Atlantic Coast Conference

Ranking
- Coaches: No. 8
- AP: No. 9
- Record: 10–2 (5–1 ACC)
- Head coach: Dick Crum (4th season)
- Captains: Shelton Robinson; Lee Shaffer
- Home stadium: Kenan Memorial Stadium

1981 Atlantic Coast Conference football standings
	Conf.					Overall
Team	W		L		T	W		L		T
No. 1 Clemson $	6	–	0	–	0	12	–	0	–	0
No. 9 North Carolina	5	–	1	–	0	10	–	2	–	0
Maryland	4	–	2	–	0	4	–	6	–	1
Duke	3	–	3	–	0	6	–	5	–	0
NC State	2	–	4	–	0	4	–	7	–	0
Wake Forest	1	–	5	–	0	4	–	7	–	0
Virginia	0	–	6	–	0	1	–	10	–	0
$ – Conference champion; Rankings from AP Poll

The 1981 North Carolina Tar Heels football team represented the University of North Carolina at Chapel Hill during the 1981 NCAA Division I-A football season. The Tar Heels were led by fourth-year head coach Dick Crum and played their home games at Kenan Memorial Stadium in Chapel Hill, North Carolina. They competed as members of the Atlantic Coast Conference, finishing in second.

== Schedule ==
Date	Time	Opponent	Rank	Site	TV	Result	Attendance	Source
September 12	1:00 p.m.	East Carolina*	No. 13	Kenan Memorial Stadium; Chapel Hill, NC		W 56–0	51,300	
September 19	1:00 p.m.	Miami (OH)*	No. 10	Kenan Memorial Stadium; Chapel Hill, NC		W 49–7	49,500	
September 26	1:00 p.m.	Boston College*	No. 9	Kenan Memorial Stadium; Chapel Hill, NC		W 56–14	48,000	
October 3	1:30 p.m.	at Georgia Tech*	No. 6	Grant Field; Atlanta, GA		W 28–7	39,263	
October 10	1:00 p.m.	Wake Forest	No. 5	Kenan Memorial Stadium; Chapel Hill, NC (rivalry)		W 48–10	51,692	
October 17	1:00 p.m.	at NC State	No. 4	Carter–Finley Stadium; Raleigh, NC (rivalry)		W 21–10	56,200	
October 24	1:00 p.m.	South Carolina*	No. 3	Kenan Memorial Stadium; Chapel Hill, NC (rivalry)		L 13–31	50,500	
October 31	1:30 p.m.	at Maryland	No. 9	Byrd Stadium; College Park, MD		W 17–10	32,100	
November 7	12:30 p.m.	No. 2 Clemson	No. 8	Kenan Memorial Stadium; Chapel Hill, NC	ABC	L 8–10	53,611	
November 14	1:30 p.m.	at Virginia	No. 13	Scott Stadium; Charlottesville, VA (South's Oldest Rivalry)		W 17–14	30,047	
November 21	1:30 p.m.	at Duke	No. 12	Wallace Wade Stadium; Durham, NC (Victory Bell)		W 31–10	38,525	
December 28	9:00 p.m.	vs. Arkansas*	No. 11	Gator Bowl Stadium; Jacksonville, FL (Gator Bowl)	ABC	W 31–27	71,009	
*Non-conference game; Rankings from AP Poll released prior to the game; All times are in Eastern time

== Roster ==
1981 North Carolina Tar Heels football team roster
Players
Coaches
Offense

Pos.	#	Name	Class
OT	54	Dave Drechsler	So
OL		Kevin Wilson	So

Defense

Pos.	#	Name	Class
OLB	84	Mike Wilcher	Jr
LB	93	Calvin Daniels	Sr

Special teams

Pos.	#	Name	Class

Head coach

- Dick Crum

Coordinators/assistant coaches

Legend

- (C) Team captain
- (S) Suspended
- (I) Ineligible
- Injured
- Redshirt
