= 1981 NCAA Division I-A football season =

American college football season

1981 NCAA Division I-A season
- Number of teams: 137
- Preseason AP No. 1: Michigan

Postseason
- Bowl games: 16
- Heisman Trophy: USC running back Marcus Allen
- Champion(s): Clemson (AP, Coaches, FWAA)

Division I-A football seasons
- ← 1980 1982 →

The 1981 NCAA Division I-A football season ended with the Clemson Tigers, unbeaten and untied, claiming the national championship after a victory over Nebraska in the Orange Bowl. This was also the first year of the California Bowl, played in Fresno, California; this game fancied itself as a "junior" version of the Rose Bowl as it pitted the Big West Conference champion vs. the Mid-American Conference champion.

== Rule changes ==
- Continuing the trend of liberalizing blocking rules, offensive linemen now are allowed to use extended arms with open hands.
- The head coach or captain may request a conference with the referee if the coach feels the rules were misinterpreted or misapplied. If the referee is correct, the requesting team will be charged with a timeout (or delay of game if no timeouts).
- Players blocked into a kicked ball inbounds will not be considered to have touched the kick.
- Holding penalty is reduced to 10 yards.
- During a field goal/PAT attempt, players are not allowed to stand, step, or jump on a teammate or opponent (leaping) or place a hand on or be picked up by a teammate (leverage) to block the kick.

== Conference and program changes ==
- This was the final season in which the Ivy League, Southern Conference, and Southland Conference competed in Division I-A; the leagues were lowered to Division I-AA (now FCS) for 1982. Until the 2025 season, the Ivy League did not participate in the post-season tournament, despite an automatic bid, citing academic concerns.
- The total number of teams in Division I-A decreased from 138 to 137 as Villanova dropped their football program following the 1980 season; it returned in 1985 at the I-AA level. Tennessee State was relegated to the Division I-AA level.

School	1980 Conference	1981 Conference
Illinois State Redbirds	I-A Independent	Missouri Valley
Tennessee State Tigers	I-A Independent	I-AA Independent
Villanova Wildcats	I-A Independent	Dropped program – reinstated in 1985

== September ==
The AP’s preseason top 5 were No. 1 Michigan, No. 2 Oklahoma, No. 3 Notre Dame, No. 4 Alabama, and No. 5 USC.

September 5: No. 4 Alabama began its season with a 24-7 win at LSU. With all other highly-ranked teams remaining idle, the Crimson Tide moved up in the next poll: No. 1 Michigan, No. 2 Alabama, No. 3 Oklahoma, No. 4 Notre Dame, and No. 5 USC.

September 12: The first full week of the season featured two major upsets. No. 1 Michigan was shocked 21-14 by Wisconsin, while No. 2 Alabama fell 24-21 to a Georgia Tech team which wouldn’t win another game all year. No. 3 Oklahoma beat Wyoming 37-20, No. 4 Notre Dame defeated LSU 27-9, and No. 5 USC won 43-7 over Tennessee. No. 6 Georgia, the defending champion, beat California 27-13, and No. 9 Penn State opened their schedule with a 52-0 shutout of Cincinnati. The next poll featured No. 1 Notre Dame, No. 2 USC, No. 3 Oklahoma, No. 4 Georgia, and No. 5 Penn State.

September 19: The new No. 1 lost to the old No. 1, as Notre Dame was defeated 25-7 by No. 11 Michigan. The Fighting Irish, under the new leadership of former high school coach Gerry Faust, soon fell out of the polls and finished 5-6, their first losing season since 1963. No. 2 USC shut out Indiana 21-0, while No. 3 Oklahoma and No. 5 Penn State were idle. No. 4 Georgia was another upset victim, falling 13-3 to Clemson. No. 6 Texas beat North Texas State 23-10, and No. 7 Pittsburgh defeated Cincinnati 38-7. The next poll featured No. 1 USC, No. 2 Oklahoma, No. 3 Penn State, No. 4 Texas, and No. 5 Pittsburgh. Clemson entered the rankings at No. 19.

September 26: In a No. 1 vs. No. 2 showdown in Los Angeles, USC scored a touchdown in the final seconds to nip Oklahoma 28-24. No. 3 Penn State won 30-24 over No. 15 Nebraska, No. 4 Texas defeated No. 14 Miami 14-7, and No. 5 Pittsburgh was idle. The next poll featured No. 1 USC, No. 2 Penn State, No. 3 Texas, No. 4 Pittsburgh, and No. 5 Oklahoma.

== October ==
October 3: No. 1 USC opened their conference schedule with a 56-22 win over Oregon State. No. 2 Penn State shut out Temple 30-0, No. 3 Texas was idle, and No. 4 Pittsburgh beat South Carolina 42-28. No. 5 Oklahoma was tied 7-7 by No. 20 Iowa State. No. 6 North Carolina moved up with a 28-7 win over Georgia Tech: No. 1 USC, No. 2 Penn State, No. 3 Texas, No. 4 Pittsburgh, and No. 5 North Carolina.

October 10: No. 1 USC was upset at home by Arizona, 13–10. No. 2 Penn State beat Boston College 38-7, but the Nittany Lions were leapfrogged by No. 3 Texas, who beat No. 10 Oklahoma 34-14. No. 4 Pittsburgh shut out West Virginia 17-0, No. 5 North Carolina beat Wake Forest 48-10, and No. 6 Michigan won 38-10 at Michigan State. The next poll featured No. 1 Texas, No. 2 Penn State, No. 3 Pittsburgh, No. 4 North Carolina, and No. 5 Michigan.

October 17: No. 1 Texas was steamrolled by Arkansas 42–11. No. 2 Penn State beat Syracuse 41-16, No. 3 Pittsburgh defeated No. 11 Florida State 42-14, and No. 4 North Carolina won 21-10 at North Carolina State. No. 5 Michigan suffered its second conference loss, falling 9-7 to No. 12 Iowa; the surprising Hawkeyes had already defeated two top-ten teams in non-conference play. No. 6 Clemson won 38-10 at Duke, and No. 7 USC moved up again with a 25-17 defeat of Stanford. The top five in the next poll were No. 1 Penn State, No. 2 Pittsburgh, No. 3 North Carolina, No. 4 Clemson, and No. 5 USC.

October 24: No. 1 Penn State won 30-7 over West Virginia, while No. 2 Pittsburgh beat Syracuse 23-10. No. 3 North Carolina lost 31-13 to South Carolina. No. 4 Clemson hosted North Carolina State and won 17-7, No. 5 USC won 14-7 at Notre Dame, and No. 7 Georgia blanked Kentucky 21-0. The next poll featured No. 1 Penn State, No. 2 Pittsburgh, No. 3 Clemson, No. 4 USC, and No. 5 Georgia.

October 31: The No. 1 team lost for the fifth time in eight weeks, as Penn State was upset 17-14 by Miami. No. 2 Pittsburgh won a close one, 29-24, at Boston College. No. 3 Clemson scored 12 touchdowns on 756 yards of offense (including a school-record 536 rushing yards) in an 82-24 rout of Wake Forest. No. 4 USC beat No. 14 Washington State 41-17, No. 5 Georgia overwhelmed Temple 49-3, and No. 6 Texas defeated Texas Tech 26-9. The next poll featured No. 1 Pittsburgh, No. 2 Clemson, No. 3 USC, No. 4 Georgia, and No. 5 Texas.

== November ==
November 7: No. 1 Pittsburgh blew out Rutgers 47-3. No. 2 Clemson matched up with No. 8 North Carolina in the highest-ranked ACC matchup up to that time, with the Tigers prevailing 10-8. No. 3 USC won 21-3 at California, and No. 4 Georgia beat Florida 26-21 behind four Herschel Walker touchdowns. No. 5 Texas was tied 14-14 by Houston, and No. 6 Penn State moved back up with a 22-15 win over North Carolina State: No. 1 Pittsburgh, No. 2 Clemson, No. 3 USC, No. 4 Georgia, and No. 5 Penn State. Clemson's match-up with North Carolina proved to be the landmark game of the season and a huge turning point for the ACC. This game which Clemson won 10–8 marked the first time two ACC teams met while ranked in the top 10. ABC broadcast this game live nationally, a huge bit of exposure for what was usually known as a basketball conference. The game ended with Jeff Bryant recovering a lateral with a minute left.

November 14: No. 1 Pittsburgh shut out Army 48-0, and No. 2 Clemson defeated Maryland 21-7. No. 3 USC lost 13-3 to Washington. No. 4 Georgia beat Auburn 24-13, but No. 5 Penn State fell 31-16 to No. 6 Alabama. No. 7 Nebraska, which had dominated its Big 8 schedule, won 31-7 over Iowa State to clinch the conference title and a spot in the Orange Bowl. The next poll featured No. 1 Pittsburgh, No. 2 Clemson, No. 3 Georgia, No. 4 Alabama, and No. 5 Nebraska.

November 21: No. 1 Pittsburgh registered its third consecutive dominant win, 35-0 over Temple. No. 2 Clemson completed an undefeated regular season with a 29-13 win at South Carolina. No. 3 Georgia and No. 4 Alabama were idle. No. 5 Nebraska finished its season with a 37-14 win over Oklahoma, and the top five remained the same. Several conference races were also decided on this day. No. 6 SMU clinched the SWC title with a 32-18 win at No. 16 Arkansas, but No. 8 Texas would represent the conference in the Cotton Bowl because the Mustangs were on probation. For the first time in 14 years, neither Ohio State nor Michigan would appear in the Rose Bowl, as the No. 7-ranked Wolverines were upset by the unranked Buckeyes, giving the Big Ten title to Iowa. Meanwhile, No. 10 USC blocked a last-second field goal attempt to beat No. 15 UCLA 22–21 and knock the Bruins out of Rose Bowl contention; this delivered the Pac-10 championship to No. 17 Washington.

November 26–28: One week away from a perfect season, No. 1 Pittsburgh was crushed 48-14 by their biggest rival, No. 11 Penn State. This left No. 2 Clemson, which had finished its schedule, as the last undefeated team and the seventh team to reach the top of the polls this year. No. 3 Georgia was idle; their last game, a 44-7 nonconference win over Georgia Tech, would come after the final poll. Alabama coach Bear Bryant won his 315th game when the No. 4-ranked Crimson Tide defeated archrival Auburn 28-17 in Birmingham, setting a new NCAA Division I record for coaching victories and tying Georgia for the SEC championship. No. 5 Nebraska and No. 6 SMU had finished their seasons, and they moved up in the final poll: No. 1 Clemson, No. 2 Georgia, No. 3 Alabama, No. 4 Nebraska, and No. 5 SMU.

For the second year in a row, the national championship was impacted by a premature bowl-game selection. As in 1980, the Sugar Bowl organizers hoped to create a de facto national title game by inviting an undefeated independent team to play against the SEC champion. However, just as Notre Dame had done the previous year, Pittsburgh lost its last regular season game after having already agreed to play in the Sugar Bowl. The Panthers had fallen all the way to No. 10 in the rankings by the time they faced off against No. 2 Georgia. Therefore, the Orange Bowl between No. 1 Clemson and No. 4 Nebraska became the highest-rated bowl-game pairing. The major bowls were rounded out by the Cotton Bowl which pitted No. 3 Alabama against No. 6 Texas and the Rose Bowl which matched No. 12 Washington against No. 13 Iowa.

== Conference standings ==
1981 Atlantic Coast Conference football standings
	Conf.					Overall
Team	W		L		T	W		L		T
No. 1 Clemson $	6	–	0	–	0	12	–	0	–	0
No. 9 North Carolina	5	–	1	–	0	10	–	2	–	0
Maryland	4	–	2	–	0	4	–	6	–	1
Duke	3	–	3	–	0	6	–	5	–	0
NC State	2	–	4	–	0	4	–	7	–	0
Wake Forest	1	–	5	–	0	4	–	7	–	0
Virginia	0	–	6	–	0	1	–	10	–	0
$ – Conference champion; Rankings from AP Poll

1981 Big Eight Conference football standings
	Conf.					Overall
Team	W		L		T	W		L		T
No. 11 Nebraska $	7	–	0	–	0	9	–	3	–	0
No. 20 Oklahoma	4	–	2	–	1	7	–	4	–	1
Kansas	4	–	3	–	0	7	–	5	–	0
Oklahoma State	4	–	3	–	0	7	–	5	–	0
No. 19 Missouri	3	–	4	–	0	8	–	4	–	0
Iowa State	2	–	4	–	1	5	–	5	–	1
Colorado	2	–	5	–	0	3	–	8	–	0
Kansas State	1	–	6	–	0	2	–	9	–	0
$ – Conference champion; Rankings from AP Poll

1981 Big Ten Conference football standings
	Conf.					Overall
Team	W		L		T	W		L		T
No. 15 Ohio State +	6	–	2	–	0	9	–	3	–	0
No. 18 Iowa +	6	–	2	–	0	8	–	4	–	0
No. 12 Michigan	6	–	3	–	0	9	–	3	–	0
Illinois	6	–	3	–	0	7	–	4	–	0
Wisconsin	6	–	3	–	0	7	–	5	–	0
Minnesota	4	–	5	–	0	6	–	5	–	0
Michigan State	4	–	5	–	0	5	–	6	–	0
Purdue	3	–	6	–	0	5	–	6	–	0
Indiana	3	–	6	–	0	3	–	8	–	0
Northwestern	0	–	9	–	0	0	–	11	–	0
+ – Conference co-champions; Rankings from AP Poll

1981 Ivy League football standings
	Conf.					Overall
Team	W		L		T	W		L		T
Yale +	6	–	1	–	0	9	–	1	–	0
Dartmouth +	6	–	1	–	0	6	–	4	–	0
Princeton	5	–	1	–	1	5	–	4	–	1
Harvard	4	–	2	–	1	5	–	4	–	1
Brown	2	–	5	–	0	3	–	7	–	0
Cornell	2	–	5	–	0	3	–	7	–	0
Columbia	1	–	6	–	0	1	–	9	–	0
Penn	1	–	6	–	0	1	–	9	–	0
+ – Conference co-champions

1981 Mid-American Conference football standings
	Conf.					Overall
Team	W		L		T	W		L		T
Toledo $	8	–	1	–	0	9	–	3	–	0
Miami (OH)	6	–	1	–	1	8	–	2	–	1
Central Michigan	7	–	2	–	0	7	–	4	–	0
Bowling Green	5	–	3	–	1	5	–	5	–	1
Western Michigan	5	–	4	–	0	6	–	5	–	0
Ohio	5	–	4	–	0	5	–	6	–	0
Kent State	3	–	6	–	0	4	–	7	–	0
Ball State	2	–	6	–	0	4	–	7	–	0
Northern Illinois	2	–	7	–	0	3	–	8	–	0
Eastern Michigan	0	–	9	–	0	0	–	11	–	0
$ – Conference champion

1981 Missouri Valley Conference football standings
	Conf.					Overall
Team	W		L		T	W		L		T
Drake +	5	–	1	–	0	10	–	1	–	0
Tulsa +	5	–	1	–	0	6	–	5	–	0
Southern Illinois	5	–	2	–	0	7	–	4	–	0
West Texas State	3	–	3	–	0	7	–	4	–	0
Wichita State	3	–	3	–	1	4	–	6	–	1
Indiana State	2	–	4	–	1	5	–	5	–	1
New Mexico State	1	–	5	–	0	3	–	8	–	0
Illinois State	0	–	5	–	0	3	–	7	–	0
+ – Conference co-champions

1981 Pacific Coast Athletic Association football standings
	Conf.					Overall
Team	W		L		T	W		L		T
San Jose State $	5	–	0	–	0	9	–	3	–	0
Utah State	4	–	1	–	1	5	–	5	–	1
Fresno State	2	–	3	–	0	5	–	6	–	0
Pacific (CA)	2	–	3	–	0	5	–	6	–	0
Cal State Fullerton	1	–	4	–	0	3	–	8	–	0
Long Beach State	1	–	4	–	0	2	–	8	–	0
$ – Conference champion

1981 Pacific-10 Conference football standings
	Conf.					Overall
Team	W		L		T	W		L		T
No. 10 Washington $	6	–	2	–	0	10	–	2	–	0
No. 16 Arizona State	5	–	2	–	0	9	–	2	–	0
No. 14 USC	5	–	2	–	0	9	–	3	–	0
Washington State	5	–	2	–	1	8	–	3	–	1
UCLA	5	–	2	–	1	7	–	4	–	1
Arizona	4	–	4	–	0	6	–	5	–	0
Stanford	4	–	4	–	0	4	–	7	–	0
California	2	–	6	–	0	2	–	9	–	0
Oregon	1	–	6	–	0	2	–	9	–	0
Oregon State	0	–	7	–	0	1	–	10	–	0
$ – Conference champion; Rankings from AP Poll

1981 Southeastern Conference football standings
	Conf.					Overall
Team	W		L		T	W		L		T
No. 6 Georgia +	6	–	0	–	0	10	–	2	–	0
No. 7 Alabama +	6	–	0	–	0	9	–	2	–	1
Mississippi State	4	–	2	–	0	8	–	4	–	0
Tennessee	3	–	3	–	0	8	–	4	–	0
Florida	3	–	3	–	0	7	–	5	–	0
Auburn	2	–	4	–	0	5	–	6	–	0
Kentucky	2	–	4	–	0	3	–	8	–	0
Ole Miss	1	–	4	–	1	4	–	6	–	1
LSU	1	–	4	–	1	3	–	7	–	1
Vanderbilt	1	–	5	–	0	4	–	7	–	0
+ – Conference co-champions; Rankings from AP Poll

1981 Southern Conference football standings
	Conf.					Overall
Team	W		L		T	W		L		T
Furman $	5	–	2	–	0	8	–	3	–	0
VMI	3	–	1	–	1	6	–	3	–	1
East Tennessee State	4	–	2	–	0	6	–	5	–	0
Chattanooga	3	–	2	–	1	7	–	3	–	1
The Citadel	3	–	2	–	1	7	–	3	–	1
Western Carolina	3	–	4	–	0	4	–	7	–	0
Appalachian State	1	–	5	–	1	3	–	7	–	1
Marshall	1	–	5	–	0	2	–	9	–	0
Davidson	0	–	0	–	0	4	–	6	–	0
$ – Conference champion; This conference was a hybrid of I-AA and I-A programs. Davidson was classified as I-AA. The rest of the teams were I-A.

1981 Southland Conference football standings
	Conf.					Overall
Team	W		L		T	W		L		T
UT Arlington $	4	–	1	–	0	6	–	5	–	0
McNeese State	3	–	1	–	1	7	–	3	–	1
Arkansas State	3	–	2	–	0	6	–	5	–	0
Louisiana Tech	2	–	2	–	1	4	–	6	–	1
Lamar	1	–	3	–	1	4	–	6	–	1
Southwestern Louisiana	0	–	4	–	1	1	–	9	–	1
$ – Conference champion

1981 Southwest Conference football standings
	Conf.					Overall
Team	W		L		T	W		L		T
No. 5 SMU $	7	–	1	–	0	10	–	1	–	0
No. 2 Texas	6	–	1	–	1	10	–	1	–	1
Houston	5	–	2	–	1	7	–	4	–	1
Arkansas	5	–	3	–	0	8	–	4	–	0
Texas A&M	4	–	4	–	0	7	–	5	–	0
Rice	3	–	5	–	0	4	–	7	–	0
Baylor	3	–	5	–	0	5	–	6	–	0
TCU	1	–	6	–	1	2	–	7	–	2
Texas Tech	0	–	7	–	1	1	–	9	–	1
$ – Conference champion; Rankings from AP Poll

1981 Western Athletic Conference football standings
	Conf.					Overall
Team	W		L		T	W		L		T
No. 13 BYU $	7	–	1	–	0	11	–	2	–	0
Hawaii	5	–	1	–	0	9	–	2	–	0
Utah	4	–	1	–	1	8	–	2	–	1
Wyoming	6	–	2	–	0	8	–	3	–	0
New Mexico	3	–	4	–	1	4	–	7	–	1
Air Force	2	–	3	–	0	4	–	7	–	0
San Diego State	3	–	5	–	0	6	–	5	–	0
UTEP	1	–	6	–	0	1	–	10	–	0
Colorado State	0	–	8	–	0	0	–	12	–	0
$ – Conference champion; Rankings from AP Poll

1981 NCAA Division I-A independents football records
	Conf.					Overall
Team	W		L		T	W		L		T
No. 4 Pittsburgh		–		–		11	–	1	–	0
No. 3 Penn State		–		–		10	–	2	–	0
No. 8 Miami (FL)		–		–		9	–	2	–	0
Southern Miss		–		–		9	–	2	–	1
No. 17 West Virginia		–		–		9	–	3	–	0
Colgate		–		–		7	–	3	–	0
Virginia Tech		–		–		7	–	4	–	0
Navy		–		–		7	–	4	–	1
Cincinnati		–		–		6	–	5	–	0
Florida State		–		–		6	–	5	–	0
Holy Cross		–		–		6	–	5	–	0
Tulane		–		–		6	–	5	–	0
UNLV		–		–		6	–	6	–	0
South Carolina		–		–		6	–	6	–	0
Temple		–		–		5	–	5	–	0
Boston College		–		–		5	–	6	–	0
East Carolina		–		–		5	–	6	–	0
Northeast Louisiana		–		–		5	–	6	–	0
Louisville		–		–		5	–	6	–	0
Notre Dame		–		–		5	–	6	–	0
Rutgers		–		–		5	–	6	–	0
William & Mary		–		–		5	–	6	–	0
Syracuse		–		–		4	–	6	–	1
Richmond		–		–		4	–	7	–	0
Army		–		–		3	–	7	–	1
North Texas State		–		–		2	–	9	–	0
Georgia Tech		–		–		1	–	10	–	0
Memphis State		–		–		1	–	10	–	0
Rankings from AP Poll

== Notable rivalry games ==
- No. 4 Alabama 28, Auburn 17
- Ohio State 14, No. 7 Michigan 9
- No. 5 Nebraska 37, Oklahoma 14
- No. 5 USC 14, Notre Dame 7
- No. 10 USC 22, No. 15 UCLA 21
- No. 11 Penn State 48, No. 1 Pitt 14
- No. 3 Texas 34, No. 10 Oklahoma 14
- No. 7 Texas 21, Texas A&M 13

== Consensus All-Americans ==
=== Offense ===
- QB – Jim McMahon – Brigham Young
- RB – Marcus Allen – Southern California
- RB – Herschel Walker – Georgia
- WR – Anthony Carter – Michigan
- TE – Tim Wrightman – UCLA
- L – Sean Farrell – Penn State
- L – Roy Foster – Southern California
- L – Terry Crouch – Oklahoma
- L – Ed Muransky – Michigan
- L – Terry Tausch – Texas
- L – Kurt Becker – Michigan
- C – Dave Rimington – Nebraska

=== Defense ===
- L – Billy Ray Smith – Arkansas
- L – Kenneth Sims – Texas
- L – Andre Tippett – Iowa
- L – Tim Krumrie – Wisconsin
- LB – Bob Crable – Notre Dame
- LB – Jeff Davis – Clemson
- LB – Sal Sunseri – Pittsburgh
- DB – Tommy Wilcox – Alabama
- DB – Mike Richardson – Arizona State
- DB – Terry Kinard – Clemson
- DB – Fred Marion – Miami (FL)
- P – Reggie Roby – Iowa

== No. 1 and No. 2 progress ==
Weeks	No. 1	No. 2	Event	
PRE	Michigan	Oklahoma		
1	Michigan	Alabama	Wisconsin 21, Michigan 14	Sep 12
2	Notre Dame	USC	Michigan 25, Notre Dame 7	Sep 19
3	USC	Oklahoma	USC 28, Oklahoma 24	Sep 26
4–5	USC	Penn State	Arizona 13, USC 10	Oct 10
6	Texas	Penn State	Arkansas 42, Texas 11	Oct 17
7–8	Penn State	Pittsburgh	Miami 17, Penn State 14	Oct 31
9–12	Pittsburgh	Clemson	Penn State 48, Pitt 14	Nov 28
13	Clemson	Georgia	Clemson 22, Nebraska 15	Jan 1

== I-AA team wins over I-A teams ==
Italics denotes I-AA teams.

Date	Visiting team	Home team	Site	Result	Attendance	Ref.
September 5	Youngstown State	Cincinnati	Nippert Stadium • Cincinnati, Ohio	19–13	8,304	
September 12	Akron	Eastern Michigan	Rynearson Stadium • Ypsilanti, Michigan	14–7	9,200	
September 19	Temple	Delaware	Delaware Stadium • Newark, Delaware	7–13	22,379	
September 19	Holy Cross	UMass	Warren McGuirk Alumni Stadium • Hadley, Massachusetts	10–13	9,960	
September 19	Fresno State	Montana State	Reno H. Sales Stadium • Bozeman, Montana	26–30	7,127	
September 19	Tennessee State	Southern Illinois	McAndrew Stadium • Carbondale, Illinois	17–14	12,500	
September 26	Princeton	Delaware	Delaware Stadium • Newark, Delaware	8–61	10,110	
September 26	Lafayette	Columbia	Baker Field • New York, New York	28–13	3,795	
September 26	Penn	Lehigh	Taylor Stadium • Bethlehem, Pennsylvania	0–58	11,436	
September 26	Dartmouth	UMass	Warren McGuirk Alumni Stadium • Hadley, Massachusetts	8–10	11,855	
October 3	Middle Tennessee	Western Carolina	E. J. Whitmire Stadium • Cullowhee, North Carolina	23–10	7,200	
October 3	Stephen F. Austin	Lamar	Cardinal Stadium • Beaumont, Texas	13–10		
October 17	Holy Cross	Connecticut	Memorial Stadium • Storrs, Connecticut	24–44	11,884	
October 17	Tennessee State	Louisville	Fairgrounds Stadium • Louisville, Kentucky	42–30	28,136	
November 7	Delaware	Penn	Franklin Field • Philadelphia, Pennsylvania	40–6	10,117	
November 14	Utah State	No. 2 (I-AA) Idaho State	ASISU Minidome • Pocatello, Idaho	24–50	12,008	
November 21	East Tennessee State	James Madison	JMU Stadium • Harrisonburg, Virginia	14–17		
November 21	Nevada	Cal State Fullerton	Titan Field • Fullerton, California	36–34	2,500	
November 21	Northeast Louisiana	Northwestern State	Harry Turpin Stadium • Natchitoches, Louisiana	9–41	6,250	
^{#}Rankings from AP Poll released prior to game.

== Bowl games ==
Rankings reflect final regular-season AP poll

New Year's Day Bowls:

- Orange Bowl: No. 1 Clemson 22, No. 4 Nebraska 15
- Sugar Bowl: No. 10 Pittsburgh 24, No. 2 Georgia 20
- Cotton Bowl: No. 6 Texas 14, No. 3 Alabama 12
- Fiesta Bowl: No. 7 Penn State 26, No. 8 USC 10
- Rose Bowl: No. 12 Washington 28, No. 13 Iowa 0

Other Bowls:

- Peach: West Virginia 26, Florida 6
- Hall of Fame: Mississippi State 10, Kansas 0
- Bluebonnet: No. 16 Michigan 33, No. 19 UCLA 14
- Liberty: No. 15 Ohio State 31, Navy 28
- Gator: No. 11 North Carolina 31, Arkansas 27
- Sun: Oklahoma 40, Houston 14
- California: Toledo 27, San Jose State 25
- Tangerine: Missouri 19, No. 18 Southern Mississippi 17
- Holiday: No. 14 Brigham Young 38, No. 20 Washington State 36
- Garden State: Tennessee 28, Wisconsin 21
- Independence: Texas A&M 33, Oklahoma State 16

=== Orange Bowl ===
Clemson's Orange Bowl opponent Nebraska featured future NFL stars Roger Craig, Irving Fryar, Mike Rozier, and Dave Rimington while finishing second nationally in rushing with 330 yards per game. But Clemson was able to take advantage of an injury to Husker quarterback Turner Gill. Eight out of twelve Nebraska possessions ended in a three and out, they crossed the fifty only four times and ended up with just two scoring opportunities.

Entering the game, the top four teams in order were Clemson, Georgia, Alabama, and Nebraska. After Georgia and Alabama had lost in Sugar and Cotton Bowls respectively, the Orange Bowl was for the national championship. The final score was 22–15, in favor of Clemson.

Pittsburgh, which was the consensus number one until being beaten soundly by Penn State in their season finale, beat defending national champion Georgia in the Sugar Bowl. Also in the national title hunt till the very end, Alabama lost to number six Texas in the Cotton Bowl Classic.

Kenneth Sims of Texas was the first pick overall in the 1982 NFL draft and was the winner of the Lombardi Award, given to the nation's best lineman.

Southern Methodist won the Southwest Conference and was ranked fifth, but was ineligible for post-season play due to NCAA probation, but could have still qualified for the national title.

== Final AP Poll ==
1. Clemson
2. Texas
3. Penn State
4. Pittsburgh
5. Southern Methodist
6. Georgia
7. Alabama
8. Miami (FL)
9. North Carolina
10. Washington
11. Nebraska
12. Michigan
13. Brigham Young
14. Southern California
15. Ohio State
16. Arizona State
17. West Virginia
18. Iowa
19. Missouri
20. Oklahoma

== Heisman Trophy voting ==
The Heisman Trophy is given to the year's most outstanding player

Player	School	Position	1st	2nd	3rd	Total
Marcus Allen	USC	RB	441	204	66	1,797
Herschel Walker	Georgia	RB	152	278	187	1,199
Jim McMahon	BYU	QB	91	131	171	706
Dan Marino	Pittsburgh	QB	16	51	106	256
Art Schlichter	Ohio State	QB	21	15	56	149
Darrin Nelson	Stanford	RB	7	7	13	48
Anthony Carter	Michigan	WR	2	11	14	42
Kenneth Sims	Texas	DT	3	6	13	34
Reggie Collier	Southern Miss	QB	2	6	12	30
Rich Diana	Yale	RB	3	2	10	23

== Award winners ==
- Maxwell – Marcus Allen – RB, USC
- Outland – Dave Rimington – C, Nebraska
- Camp – Marcus Allen – RB, USC
- Lombardi – Kenneth Sims – DT, Texas
- O'Brien – Jim McMahon – QB, BYU

== Attendances ==
Average home attendance top 3:

Rank	Team	Average
1	Michigan Wolverines	105,498
2	Tennessee Volunteers	93,166
3	Ohio State Buckeyes	86,960
