= 1981 Mississippi State Bulldogs football team =

American college football season

1981 Mississippi State Bulldogs football

Hall of Fame Classic, W 10–0 vs. Kansas
- Conference: Southeastern Conference

Ranking
- Coaches: No. 17
- Record: 8–4 (4–2 SEC)
- Head coach: Emory Bellard (3rd season)
- Defensive coordinator: Melvin Robertson (3rd season)
- Home stadium: Scott Field; Mississippi Veterans Memorial Stadium

1981 Southeastern Conference football standings
	Conf.					Overall
Team	W		L		T	W		L		T
No. 6 Georgia +	6	–	0	–	0	10	–	2	–	0
No. 7 Alabama +	6	–	0	–	0	9	–	2	–	1
Mississippi State	4	–	2	–	0	8	–	4	–	0
Tennessee	3	–	3	–	0	8	–	4	–	0
Florida	3	–	3	–	0	7	–	5	–	0
Auburn	2	–	4	–	0	5	–	6	–	0
Kentucky	2	–	4	–	0	3	–	8	–	0
Ole Miss	1	–	4	–	1	4	–	6	–	1
LSU	1	–	4	–	1	3	–	7	–	1
Vanderbilt	1	–	5	–	0	4	–	7	–	0
+ – Conference co-champions; Rankings from AP Poll

The 1981 Mississippi State Bulldogs football team represented Mississippi State University as a member of the Southeastern Conference (SEC) during the 1981 NCAA Division I-A football season. Led by third-year head coach Emory Bellard, the Bulldogs compiled an overall record of 8–4, with a mark of 4–2 in conference play, and finished third in the SEC.

== Schedule ==
Date	Opponent	Rank	Site	Result	Attendance	Source
September 5	Memphis State*	No. 14	Mississippi Veterans Memorial Stadium; Jackson, MS	W 20–3	42,507	
September 19	Vanderbilt	No. 14	Scott Field; Starkville, MS	W 29–9	32,045	
September 26	Florida	No. 12	Mississippi Veterans Memorial Stadium; Jackson, MS	W 28–7	45,250	
October 3	Missouri*	No. 9	Mississippi Veterans Memorial Stadium; Jackson, MS	L 3–14	40,776	
October 10	at Colorado State*	No. 19	Hughes Stadium; Fort Collins, CO	W 37–27	24,761	
October 17	No. 13 Miami (FL)*	No. 16	Scott Field; Starkville, MS	W 14–10	33,225	
October 24	at Auburn	No. 9	Jordan-Hare Stadium; Auburn, AL	W 21–17	58,000	
October 31	at No. 8 Alabama	No. 7	Bryant–Denny Stadium; Tuscaloosa, AL (rivalry)	L 10–13	60,210	
November 7	vs. No. 20 Southern Miss*	No. 15	Mississippi Veterans Memorial Stadium; Jackson, MS	L 6–7	64,112	
November 14	at LSU		Tiger Stadium; Baton Rouge, LA (rivalry)	W 17–9	71,303	
November 21	vs. Ole Miss		Mississippi Veterans Memorial Stadium; Jackson, MS (Egg Bowl)	L 17–21	61,153	
December 31	vs. Kansas*		Legion Field; Birmingham, AL (Hall of Fame Classic)	W 10–0	41,672	
*Non-conference game; Rankings from AP Poll released prior to the game

== Season summary ==
=== at Auburn ===
External videos
- John Bond game-winning touchdown pass to Danny Knight vs. Auburn, 1981

== Personnel ==
1981 Mississippi State Bulldogs football team roster
Players
Coaches
Offense

Pos.	#	Name	Class
QB	13	John Bond	So
C	58	Kent Hull

Defense

Pos.	#	Name	Class
DE	79	Glen Collins
LB	99	Johnie Cooks

Special teams

Pos.	#	Name	Class
K, P		Dana Moore	Jr

Head coach

- Emory Bellard

Coordinators/assistant coaches

Legend

- (C) Team captain
- (S) Suspended
- (I) Ineligible
- Injured
- Redshirt
