= Brian Franco =

American football player (born 1959)

No. 3, 10, 4
- Position: Placekicker

Personal information
- Born: December 3, 1959 (age 66); Annapolis, Maryland, U.S.
- Listed height: 5 ft 8 in (1.73 m)
- Listed weight: 165 lb (75 kg)

Career information
- High school: Glen Burnie (Glen Burnie, Maryland)
- College: Penn State
- NFL draft: 1982: undrafted

Career history
- Philadelphia Eagles (1982)*; Jacksonville Bulls (1984-1985); Minnesota Vikings (1986)*; Dallas Cowboys (1987)*; Cleveland Browns (1987)
- * Offseason or practice squad member only

Career NFL statistics
- Field goals: 3
- Field goal attempts: 4
- Field goal %: 75
- Longest field goal: 28
- Stats at Pro Football Reference

Brian Franco (born December 3, 1959) is an American former professional football player who was a placekicker for the Cleveland Browns of the National Football League (NFL). He played college football for the Penn State Nittany Lions.

== Scoring ==
College career totals

TDS	XP	FG	PTS
0	42	15	87

USFL career totals

TDS	XP	FG	PTS
0	18	15	63

== Punting ==
College career totals
Did not punt

USFL career totals

NO	YDS	AVG	BLK
14	613	43.8	0
