= 1981 Georgia Bulldogs football team =

American college football season

1981 Georgia Bulldogs football

SEC co-champion

Sugar Bowl, L 20–24 vs. Pittsburgh
- Conference: Southeastern Conference

Ranking
- Coaches: No. 5
- AP: No. 6
- Record: 10–2 (6–0 SEC)
- Head coach: Vince Dooley (18th season)
- Offensive coordinator: George Haffner (2nd season)
- Defensive coordinator: Bill Lewis (1st season)
- Home stadium: Sanford Stadium

1981 Southeastern Conference football standings
| | Conf. | | | | | Overall |
| Team | W | | L | | T | W | | L | | T |
|---|---|---|---|---|---|---|---|---|---|---|
| No. 6 Georgia + | 6 | – | 0 | – | 0 | 10 | – | 2 | – | 0 |
| No. 7 Alabama + | 6 | – | 0 | – | 0 | 9 | – | 2 | – | 1 |
| Mississippi State | 4 | – | 2 | – | 0 | 8 | – | 4 | – | 0 |
| Tennessee | 3 | – | 3 | – | 0 | 8 | – | 4 | – | 0 |
| Florida | 3 | – | 3 | – | 0 | 7 | – | 5 | – | 0 |
| Auburn | 2 | – | 4 | – | 0 | 5 | – | 6 | – | 0 |
| Kentucky | 2 | – | 4 | – | 0 | 3 | – | 8 | – | 0 |
| Ole Miss | 1 | – | 4 | – | 1 | 4 | – | 6 | – | 1 |
| LSU | 1 | – | 4 | – | 1 | 3 | – | 7 | – | 1 |
| Vanderbilt | 1 | – | 5 | – | 0 | 4 | – | 7 | – | 0 |
+ – Conference co-champions; Rankings from AP Poll

The 1981 Georgia Bulldogs football team represented the University of Georgia as a member of the Southeastern Conference (SEC) during the 1981 NCAA Division I-A football season. Led by 18th-year head coach Vince Dooley, the Bulldogs compiled an overall record of 10–2, with a mark of 6–0 in conference play, and finished as SEC co-champion.

== Schedule ==
| Date | Opponent | Rank | Site | TV | Result | Attendance | Source |
|---|---|---|---|---|---|---|---|
| September 5 | Tennessee | No. 10 | Sanford Stadium; Athens, GA (rivalry) | | W 44–0 | 79,600 | |
| September 12 | California* | No. 6 | Sanford Stadium; Athens, GA | | W 27–13 | 79,400 | |
| September 19 | at Clemson* | No. 4 | Memorial Stadium; Clemson, SC (rivalry) | | L 3–13 | 62,466 | |
| September 26 | South Carolina* | No. 17 | Sanford Stadium; Athens, GA (rivalry) | | W 24–0 | 82,100 | |
| October 10 | at Ole Miss | No. 11 | Hemingway Stadium; Oxford, MS | | W 37–7 | 41,125 | |
| October 17 | at Vanderbilt | No. 9 | Dudley Field; Nashville, TN (rivalry) | ABC | W 53–21 | 39,657 | |
| October 24 | Kentucky^{†} | No. 7 | Sanford Stadium; Athens, GA | | W 21–0 | 80,780 | |
| October 31 | Temple* | No. 5 | Sanford Stadium; Athens, GA | | W 49–3 | 80,117 | |
| November 7 | vs. Florida | No. 4 | Gator Bowl Stadium; Jacksonville, FL (rivalry) | ABC | W 26–21 | 68,648 | |
| November 14 | Auburn | No. 4 | Sanford Stadium; Athens, GA (rivalry) | | W 24–13 | 82,165 | |
| December 5 | at Georgia Tech* | No. 2 | Grant Field; Atlanta, GA (rivalry) | ABC | W 44–7 | 58,623 | |
| January 1, 1982 | vs. No. 8 Pittsburgh* | No. 2 | Louisiana Superdome; New Orleans, LA (Sugar Bowl) | ABC | L 20–24 | 77,224 | |
*Non-conference game; ^{†}Homecoming; Rankings from AP Poll released prior to the game

== Game summaries ==
=== Tennessee ===
The momentum of 1980 continued into September 1981 for the Georgia Bulldogs as Herschel Walker and company took control early in the season by scoring early and often in wins against Tennessee (44–0) and the Cal Golden Bears (27–13). Against the Volunteers, Walker rushed for 161 yards on 30 carries.

=== California ===
Walker pounded California by rushing 35 times for 167 yards on September 12.

=== Clemson ===
After hitting a dip in the season, losing 13–3 to eventual national champion Clemson, Georgia regained its focus and won out to get to 10–1 by the regular season's end. Even though Walker was able to push, shove, and get through Clemson's defense by rushing 28 times for 111 yards, it wasn't enough to overcome 9 turnovers by the Bulldogs in the loss to the Tigers.

=== South Carolina ===
Georgia and Walker rebounded by blanking South Carolina, 24–0, on September 26 as the sophomore running back ran for 176 yards on 36 carries. Georgia, however, only led 3–0 at the half. Walker opened things up for the Bulldogs in the third quarter by scoring on touchdown runs of 3 and 8 yards to put the Gamecocks away.

=== Ole Miss ===
Walker's Bulldogs reeled off solid wins—all in October—over Ole Miss (37-7), Vanderbilt (53-21), Kentucky (21-0), and Temple (49-3). He rushed for a season-high 265 yards on 41 attempts and a touchdown against Mississippi on October 10.

=== Vanderbilt ===
A week later, Walker rushed 39 times for 188 yards and 2 touchdowns versus Vanderbilt.

=== Temple ===
Against Temple, he scored a career-high 4 touchdowns while rushing 23 times for 112 yards against the Owls.

=== Florida ===
Florida Gators vs. Georgia Bulldogs

| Quarter | 1 | 2 | 3 | 4 | Total |
|---|---|---|---|---|---|
| Florida | 0 | 14 | 0 | 7 | 21 |
| Georgia | 0 | 7 | 7 | 12 | 26 |

at Gator Bowl • Jacksonville, Florida

- Date: November 7
- Game attendance: 68,648

Game information

Florida

- Wayne Peace
  21/37, 272 Yds, 2 TD, INT
- James Jones
  12 Rush, 52 Yds, TD
- Broughton Lang
  5 Rec, 70 Yds

Georgia

- Buck Belue
  13/22, 187 Yds, 2 TD
- Herschel Walker
  47 Rush, 192 Yds, 2 TD
  4 Rec, 55 Yds, 2 TD

On November 7, seventh-ranked Georgia got behind, 14–0, down in Jacksonville, to the Florida Gators, but came back to win in a repeat score of last season's game, 26–21. Walker rushed a career-high 47 times for 192 yards while scoring four touchdowns.

Scoring summary

| Quarter | Time | Drive | | | Team | Scoring information | Score | |
| Quarter | Time | Plays | Yards | TOP | Team | Scoring information | FLA | UGA |
|---|---|---|---|---|---|---|---|---|
| 2 | 5:31 | | | | Florida | Steve Miller 54-yard touchdown reception from Wayne Peace, Clark kick good | 7 | 0 |
| 2 | 3:37 | | | | Florida | James Jones 1-yard touchdown run, Clark kick good | 14 | 0 |
| 2 | 1:10 | | 68 | | Georgia | Herschel Walker 24-yard touchdown reception from Buck Belue, Kevin Butler kick good | 14 | 7 |
| 3 | | | | | Georgia | Herschel Walker 16-yard touchdown reception from Buck Belue, Kevin Butler kick good | 14 | 14 |
| 4 | 13:40 | | 47 | | Georgia | Herschel Walker 4-yard touchdown run, Kevin Butler kick no good | 14 | 20 |
| 4 | Florida | | 80 | | | Spencer Jackson 10-yard touchdown reception from Wayne Peace, Clark kick good | 21 | 20 |
| 4 | 2:31 | | 95 | | Georgia | Herschel Walker 1-yard touchdown run, 2-point run failed | 21 | 26 |
| "TOP" = time of possession. For other American football terms, see Glossary of American football. | | | | | | | 21 | 26 |

=== Auburn ===
| Team | 1 | 2 | 3 | 4 | Total |
|---|---|---|---|---|---|
| Auburn | 0 | 7 | 0 | 6 | 13 |
| • Georgia | 3 | 14 | 7 | 0 | 24 |

- Date: November 14
- Location: Sanford Stadium • Athens, Georgia

Scoring summary
| 1 | UGA | Butler 20-yard field goal | Georgia 3-0 |
| 2 | AUB | Edwards 7-yard run (Del Greco kick) | Auburn 7-3 |
| 2 | UGA | Brown 46-yard pass from Belue (Butler kick) | Georgia 10-7 |
| 2 | UGA | Kay 5-yard pass from Belue (Butler kick) | Georgia 17-7 |
| 3 | UGA | Walker 2-yard run (Butler kick) | Georgia 24-7 |
| 4 | AUB | Beauford 1-yard run (run failed) | Georgia 24-13 |

The Bulldogs finished out the regular season at home against nearby rivals: the Auburn Tigers (November 14) and the Georgia Tech Yellow Jackets (December 5). The 24–13 win over coach Pat Dye's Tigers clinched a 2nd SEC Championship in a row for Georgia. In the third quarter, Walker's 2-yard touchdown run gave the Bulldogs a commanding 24–7 lead. Walker pounded out 165 yards on 37 rushes during the contest. Georgia led Auburn 17–7 at the half as senior quarterback Buck Belue complimented Walker's power ground game by throwing for two touchdowns.

=== Georgia Tech ===
Against Georgia Tech, seniors Belue and Scott set the tone on the game's first play by hooking up on an 80-yard pass as Scott raced into the end zone to spark a 34–0 halftime lead. Walker got into the act by scoring three touchdowns in the first half. He added a 1-yard touchdown run in the fourth quarter as Georgia cruised past the Yellow Jackets, 44–7. Walker finished with 36 rushes for 225 yards and 4 touchdowns in the rivalry matchup.

=== Pittsburgh ===
Riding an 8-game winning streak, Georgia (10–1) was ranked No. 2 in the country when they faced Pittsburgh (also 10–1, ranked No. 10) in the 1982 Sugar Bowl. Walker made his presence felt early as he bolted 8 yards for a touchdown in the 2nd quarter giving Georgia a 7–0 lead. After a 30-yard, Dan Marino touchdown pass lifted Pitt to a 10–7 lead in third quarter, Walker answered. Walker scored from 10 yards out to give Georgia a 14–10 lead going into the 4th quarter. With Georgia clinging to a 20–17 lead late in the game, Marino found Pittsburgh's receiver John Brown for a 33-yard touchdown pass with 0:35 left in the game. Walker's Bulldogs came up short in the loss, 20–24. He finished with 25 rushes for 84 yards and led UGA in receptions with 3 catches for 53 yards.

== Roster ==
1981 Georgia Bulldogs football team roster
Players
Coaches
Offense

| Pos. | # | Name | Class |
|---|---|---|---|
| QB | 8 | Buck Belue | Sr |
| TE | 88 | Norris Brown | Jr |
| WR | 24 | Lindsay Scott | Sr |
| | | Ronnie Stewart |
| RB | 34 | Herschel Walker | So |
| | | Scott Williams |

Defense

| Pos. | # | Name | Class |
|---|---|---|---|
| | | Freddie Gilbert |
| ROV | 14 | Terry Hoage | So |
| | | Jimmy Payne |

Special teams

| Pos. | # | Name | Class |
|---|---|---|---|
| K | 6 | Kevin Butler | Fr |

Head coach

- Vince Dooley

Coordinators/assistant coaches

Legend

- (C) Team captain
- (S) Suspended
- (I) Ineligible
- Injured
- Redshirt
