= 1981 Florida Gators football team =

American college football season

1981 Florida Gators football

Peach Bowl, L 6–26 vs. West Virginia
- Conference: Southeastern Conference
- Record: 7–5 (3–3 SEC)
- Head coach: Charley Pell (3rd season)
- Offensive coordinator: Mike Shanahan (2nd season)
- Defensive coordinator: Joe Kines (1st season)
- Home stadium: Florida Field

1981 Southeastern Conference football standings
| | Conf. | | | | | Overall |
| Team | W | | L | | T | W | | L | | T |
|---|---|---|---|---|---|---|---|---|---|---|
| No. 6 Georgia + | 6 | – | 0 | – | 0 | 10 | – | 2 | – | 0 |
| No. 7 Alabama + | 6 | – | 0 | – | 0 | 9 | – | 2 | – | 1 |
| Mississippi State | 4 | – | 2 | – | 0 | 8 | – | 4 | – | 0 |
| Tennessee | 3 | – | 3 | – | 0 | 8 | – | 4 | – | 0 |
| Florida | 3 | – | 3 | – | 0 | 7 | – | 5 | – | 0 |
| Auburn | 2 | – | 4 | – | 0 | 5 | – | 6 | – | 0 |
| Kentucky | 2 | – | 4 | – | 0 | 3 | – | 8 | – | 0 |
| Ole Miss | 1 | – | 4 | – | 1 | 4 | – | 6 | – | 1 |
| LSU | 1 | – | 4 | – | 1 | 3 | – | 7 | – | 1 |
| Vanderbilt | 1 | – | 5 | – | 0 | 4 | – | 7 | – | 0 |
+ – Conference co-champions; Rankings from AP Poll

The 1981 Florida Gators football team represented the University of Florida during the 1981 NCAA Division I-A football season. The season was Charley Pell's third year as the head coach of the Florida Gators football team. Pell's 1981 Florida Gators posted an overall record of 7–5 and a Southeastern Conference (SEC) record of 3–3, and tying for fourth place among ten SEC teams.

== Schedule ==
| Date | Opponent | Rank | Site | TV | Result | Attendance | Source |
|---|---|---|---|---|---|---|---|
| September 5 | at Miami (FL)* | No. 17 | Miami Orange Bowl; Miami, FL (rivalry) | | L 20–21 | 73,817 | |
| September 12 | Furman* | | Florida Field; Gainesville, FL | | W 35–7 | 54,439 | |
| September 19 | Georgia Tech* | | Florida Field; Gainesville, FL | | W 27–6 | 63,879 | |
| September 26 | at No. 12 Mississippi State | | Mississippi Veterans Memorial Stadium; Jackson, MS | ABC | L 7–28 | 45,250 | |
| October 3 | at LSU | | Tiger Stadium; Baton Rouge, LA (rivalry) | | W 24–10 | 73,665 | |
| October 10 | Maryland* | | Florida Field; Gainesville, FL | | W 15–10 | 56,319 | |
| October 17 | Ole Miss | | Florida Field; Gainesville, FL | | W 49–3 | 64,126 | |
| October 31 | at Auburn | | Jordan-Hare Stadium; Auburn, AL (rivalry) | | L 12–14 | 65,000 | |
| November 7 | vs. No. 4 Georgia | | Gator Bowl Stadium; Jacksonville, FL (rivalry) | ABC | L 21–26 | 68,648 | |
| November 14 | Kentucky | | Florida Field; Gainesville, FL (rivalry) | | W 33–12 | 60,286 | |
| November 28 | Florida State* | | Florida Field; Gainesville, FL (rivalry) | | W 35–3 | 64,437 | |
| December 31 | vs. West Virginia* | | Atlanta–Fulton County Stadium; Atlanta, GA (Peach Bowl) | CBS | L 6–26 | 37,582 | |
*Non-conference game; Rankings from AP Poll released prior to the game

== Roster ==
1981 Florida Gators football team roster
Players
Coaches
Offense

| Pos. | # | Name | Class |
|---|---|---|---|
| OT | 75 | Lomas Brown | Fr |
| RB | 34 | Lorenzo Hampton | Fr |
| | | Spencer Jackson |
| RB | 30 | James Jones | Jr |
| | | Broughton Lang |
| QB | | Wayne Peace | So |
| WR | 82 | Ted Alston | Sr |

Defense

| Pos. | # | Name | Class |
|---|---|---|---|
| | | David Galloway |
| LB | 88 | Wilber Marshall | So |

Special teams

| Pos. | # | Name | Class |

Head coach

- Charley Pell

Coordinators/assistant coaches

- Mike Shanahan (OC)
- Vince Kendrick (RB)

Legend

- (C) Team captain
- (S) Suspended
- (I) Ineligible
- Injured
- Redshirt
