= 1981 Alabama Crimson Tide football team =

American college football season

1981 Alabama Crimson Tide football

SEC co-champion

Cotton Bowl, L 12–14 vs. Texas
- Conference: Southeastern Conference

Ranking
- Coaches: No. 6
- AP: No. 7
- Record: 9–2–1 (6–0 SEC)
- Head coach: Bear Bryant (24th season)
- Offensive coordinator: Mal Moore (7th season)
- Offensive scheme: Wishbone
- Defensive coordinator: Ken Donahue (8th season)
- Base defense: 5–2
- Captains: Warren Lyles; Alan Gray
- Home stadium: Bryant–Denny Stadium; Legion Field

1981 Southeastern Conference football standings
	Conf.					Overall
Team	W		L		T	W		L		T
No. 6 Georgia +	6	–	0	–	0	10	–	2	–	0
No. 7 Alabama +	6	–	0	–	0	9	–	2	–	1
Mississippi State	4	–	2	–	0	8	–	4	–	0
Tennessee	3	–	3	–	0	8	–	4	–	0
Florida	3	–	3	–	0	7	–	5	–	0
Auburn	2	–	4	–	0	5	–	6	–	0
Kentucky	2	–	4	–	0	3	–	8	–	0
Ole Miss	1	–	4	–	1	4	–	6	–	1
LSU	1	–	4	–	1	3	–	7	–	1
Vanderbilt	1	–	5	–	0	4	–	7	–	0
+ – Conference co-champions; Rankings from AP Poll

The 1981 Alabama Crimson Tide football team (variously "Alabama", "UA" or "Bama") represented the University of Alabama in the 1981 NCAA Division I-A football season. It was the Crimson Tide's 87th overall and 48th season as a member of the Southeastern Conference (SEC). The team was led by head coach Bear Bryant, in his 24th year, and played their home games at Bryant–Denny Stadium in Tuscaloosa and Legion Field in Birmingham, Alabama. They finished season with nine wins, two losses and one tie (9–2–1 overall, 6–0 in the SEC), as SEC co-champions with Georgia and with a loss against Texas in the Cotton Bowl.

Alabama recovered from an upset loss to a 1–10 Georgia Tech team to win its ninth SEC title in eleven years (shared with Georgia). It was Bama's 18th SEC championship, and the 13th and last conference title for Paul "Bear" Bryant at Alabama. Alabama's 28–17 win over Auburn was Coach Bryant's 315th career victory, breaking the then all-time record held by Amos Alonzo Stagg. Alabama's Cotton Bowl Classic loss to Texas dropped the Tide's all-time record against the Longhorns to 0–7–1.

== Schedule ==
Date	Time	Opponent	Rank	Site	TV	Result	Attendance	Source
September 5	8:00 p.m.	at LSU	No. 4	Tiger Stadium; Baton Rouge, LA (rivalry)	ABC	W 24–7	78,066	
September 12	4:00 p.m.	Georgia Tech*	No. 2	Legion Field; Birmingham, AL (rivalry)	ESPN	L 21–24	78,865	
September 19	12:30 p.m.	at Kentucky	No. 12	Commonwealth Stadium; Lexington, KY		W 19–10	57,853	
September 26	7:00 p.m.	at Vanderbilt	No. 10	Vanderbilt Stadium; Nashville, TN		W 28–7	41,000	
October 3	1:30 p.m.	Ole Miss (Note: Prior to the 1980 season, the SEC ruled if two SEC teams scheduled each another independently, and not through the conference office, the game would not count in SEC standings. As such, although both were members of the SEC, the Alabama–Ole Miss games in 1980 and 1981 did not count as conference games in the official SEC standings.)*	No. 11	Bryant–Denny Stadium; Tuscaloosa, AL (rivalry)		W 38–7	60,210	
October 10	1:30 p.m.	Southern Miss*	No. 7	Legion Field; Birmingham, AL		T 13–13	76,400	
October 17	1:30 p.m.	Tennessee	No. 15	Legion Field; Birmingham, AL (Third Saturday in October)		W 38–19	78,550	
October 24	1:30 p.m.	Rutgers*^{†}	No. 11	Bryant–Denny Stadium; Tuscaloosa, AL		W 31–7	60,210	
October 31	1:30 p.m.	No. 7 Mississippi State	No. 8	Bryant–Denny Stadium; Tuscaloosa, AL (rivalry)		W 13–10	60,210	
November 14	11:30 a.m.	at No. 5 Penn State*	No. 6	Beaver Stadium; University Park, PA (rivalry)	ABC	W 31–16	85,133	
November 28	2:45 p.m.	vs. Auburn	No. 4	Legion Field; Birmingham, AL (Iron Bowl)	ABC	W 28–17	78,170	
January 1, 1982	1:00 p.m.	vs. No. 6 Texas*	No. 3	Cotton Bowl; Dallas, TX (Cotton Bowl Classic)	CBS	L 12–14	73,243	
*Non-conference game; ^{†}Homecoming; Rankings from AP Poll released prior to the game; All times are in Central time
