= 1982 Sugar Bowl =

- 48th Sugar Bowl
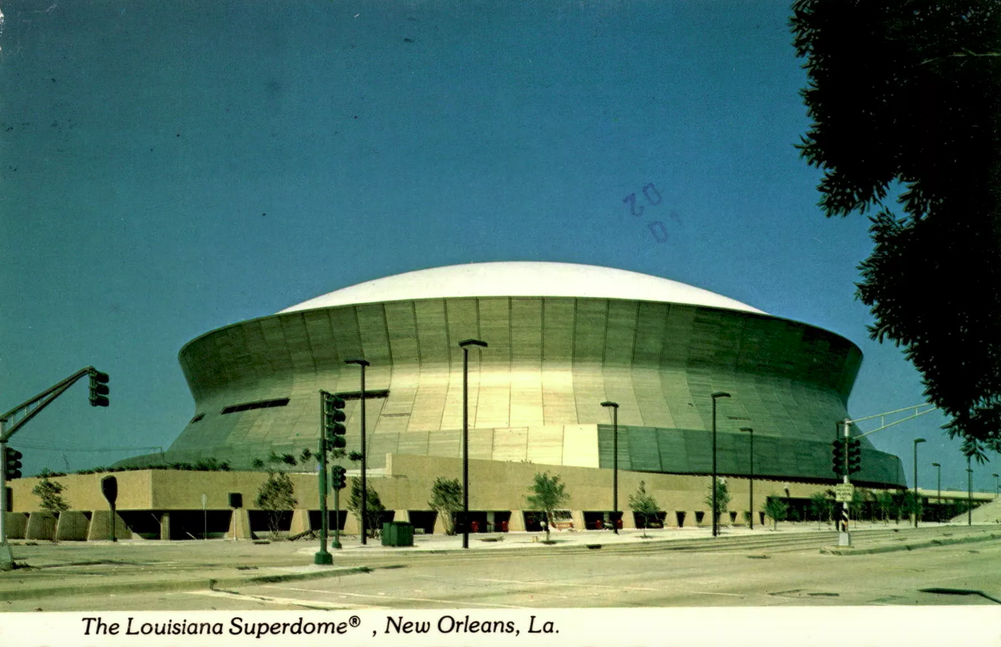
- The Louisiana Superdome in New Orleans, Louisiana, hosted the Sugar Bowl.
Pittsburgh Panthers	Georgia Bulldogs
(10–1)	(10–1)
Independent	SEC
24	20
Head coach: Jackie Sherrill	Head coach: Vince Dooley
AP / Coaches; 10 / 8	AP / Coaches; 2 / 2
	1	2	3	4	Total
Pittsburgh	0	3	7	14	24
Georgia	0	7	6	7	20
- Date: January 1, 1982
- Season: 1981
- Stadium: Louisiana Superdome
- Location: New Orleans, Louisiana
- MVP: Dan Marino (Pittsburgh QB)
- Favorite: Georgia by 1½ points
- Referee: Ken Faulkner (SWC)
- Attendance: 77,224

United States TV coverage
- Network: ABC
- Announcers: Keith Jackson and Frank Broyles

The 1982 Sugar Bowl was the 48th edition of the college football bowl game, played at the Louisiana Superdome in New Orleans, on Friday, January 1. Part of the 1981–82 bowl game season, it matched the No. 2 Georgia Bulldogs of the Southeastern Conference (SEC), the defending national champions, and the No. 8 Pittsburgh Panthers, an independent. The slight underdog Panthers won the game 24–20.

== Game summary ==
The game kicked off shortly after 7 p.m. CST, televised by ABC, at the same time as the Orange Bowl on NBC.

Junior quarterback Dan Marino, a future first-round draft pick, started for Pittsburgh and Buck Belue for Georgia. The Bulldogs relied on their running game, powered by sophomore Herschel Walker, who rushed for two touchdowns. Scoreless in the first quarter, Georgia led early with an 8-yard run from Walker, then Pitt kicked a field goal and the score was 7–3 at halftime.

Scoring increased in the second half, with five lead changes. The Panthers scored a touchdown to go ahead 10–7; Georgia got the lead back and the game was 13–10 (as a result of a missed PAT) at the end of the third quarter. Marino threw a short touchdown to John Brown to take back the lead at 17–13. Georgia scored again with a 6-yard pass and the game was 20–17. Pitt reclaimed the lead with just 35 seconds to go with a 33-yard pass from Marino to Brown on 4th and 4 and won 24–20.

=== Scoring ===
First quarter

No scoring

Second quarter

- Georgia – Herschel Walker 8-yard run (Kevin Butler kick)
- Pitt – Snuffy Everett 41-yard field goal

Third quarter

- Pitt – Julius Dawkins 30-yard pass from Dan Marino (Everett kick)
- Georgia – Walker 10-yard run (kick failed)

Fourth quarter

- Pitt – John Brown 6-yard pass from Marino (Everett kick)
- Georgia – Clarence Kay 6-yard pass from Buck Belue (Butler kick)
- Pitt – Brown 33-yard pass from Marino (Everett kick)

== Statistics ==
Statistics	Pittsburgh	Georgia
First downs	27	11
Rushing yards	44–208	36–141
Passing yards	261	83
Passing	26–41–2	8–15–2
Total offense	85–469	51–224
Punts–average	2–44.5	6–39.5
Fumbles–lost	5–3	2–2
Turnovers	5	4
Penalties–yards	14–96	5–35

== Aftermath ==
Pittsburgh moved up to fourth (#2 UPI) in the final polls, while the Bulldogs dropped to sixth (#5 UPI). It has often been called one of the greatest bowl games, and bowl upsets, of all time. It also marks the last time the Pitt Panthers won a major bowl game.

This was Jackie Sherrill's final game at Pitt. Eighteen days after the Sugar Bowl, he agreed to a six-year, $1.7-million contract to become head coach and athletic director at Texas A&M. Defensive coordinator Foge Fazio was promoted to succeed Sherrill.

== Legacy ==
Twenty-two Pittsburgh Panthers were drafted over the next four years by the National Football League. Six of them were selected in the first round, including Marino, Jim Covert, Tim Lewis, Bill Maas, Chris Doleman, and Bill Fralic. Marino, Covert and Doleman were elected to the Pro Football Hall of Fame. Covert and Tom Flynn played for the winning teams to win a Super Bowl, four years later in Super Bowl XX with the Chicago Bears, also played in the Superdome. Tom Flynn, Free Safety for Pitt also won a Super Bowl XXI with the New York Giants when they beat Denver.
