= 1981 Peach Bowl (December) =

American college football game

- 14th Peach Bowl
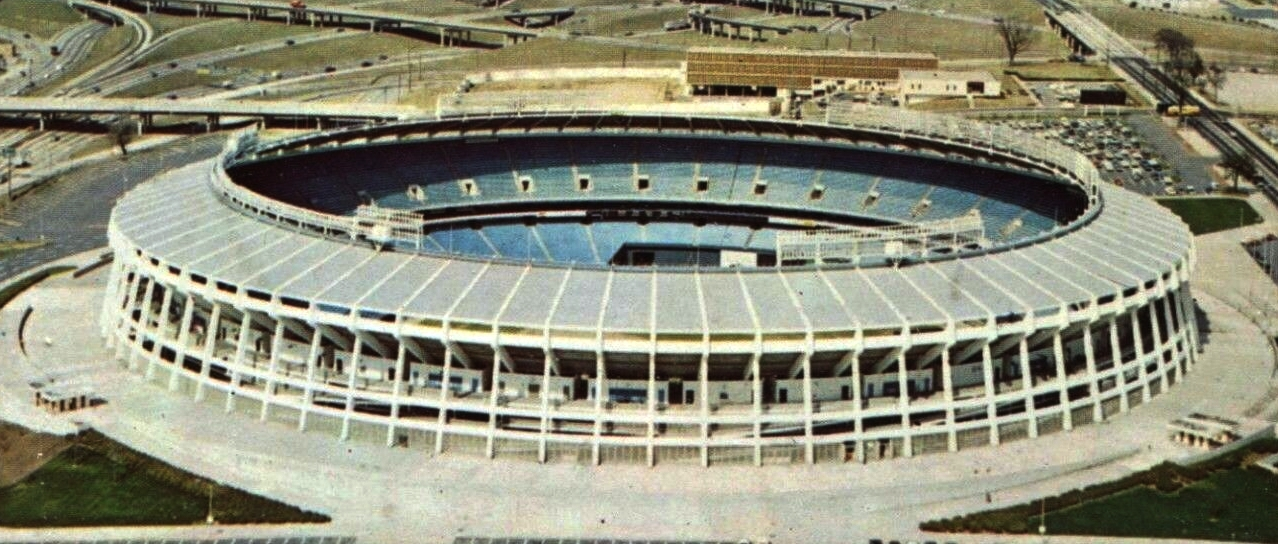
- Atlanta–Fulton County Stadium in Atlanta, Georgia, hosted the Peach Bowl.
West Virginia Mountaineers	Florida Gators
(8–3)	(7–4)
Independent	SEC
26	6
Head coach: Don Nehlen	Head coach: Charley Pell
	1	2	3	4	Total
West Virginia	7	9	3	7	26
Florida	0	0	0	6	6
- Date: December 31, 1981
- Season: 1981
- Stadium: Fulton County Stadium
- Location: Atlanta, Georgia
- MVP: Offense: Mickey Walczak (West Virginia); Defense: Don Stemple (West Virginia)
- Referee: Vance Carlson (Big Eight)

United States TV coverage
- Network: CBS
- Announcers: Frank Glieber, Johnny Morris, and Dick Stockton

The 1981 Peach Bowl was a post-season college football bowl game between the West Virginia Mountaineers and the Florida Gators. The game took place on December 31, 1981, resulting in a West Virginia win over Florida 26–6. The offensive MVP was Mickey Walczak of West Virginia and the defensive MVP was West Virginia's Don Stemple.

Florida coach Charley Pell was so disappointed by his team's performance that he burned the game film and buried it in the Gators' practice field.
