= 1982 NFL draft =

National Football League draft

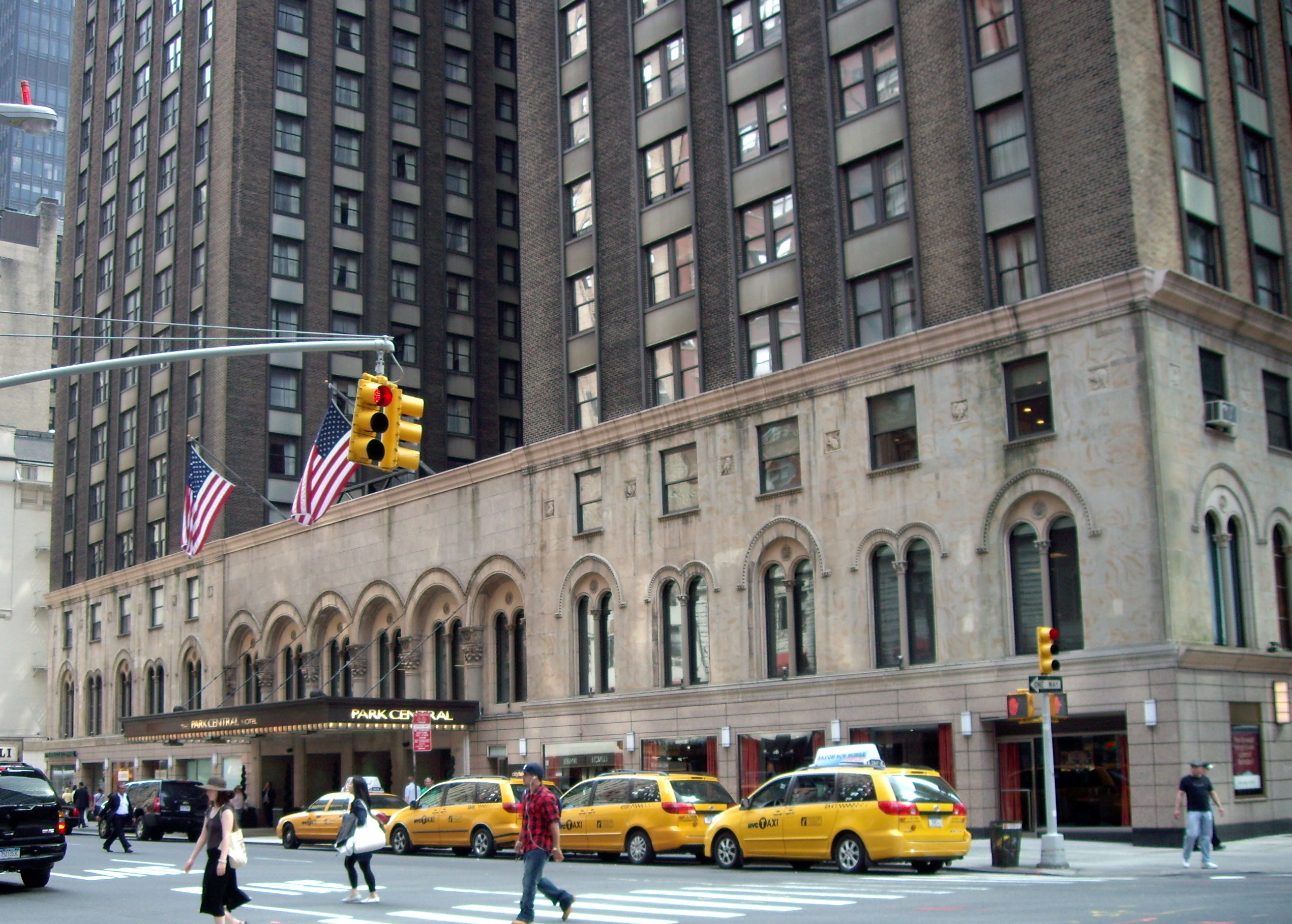
- The former Sheraton Hotel (draft venue), photographed in 2010

General information
- Date: April 27–28, 1982
- Location: New York Sheraton Hotel in New York City
- Network: ESPN

Overview
- 334 total selections in 12 rounds
- League: NFL
- First selection: Kenneth Sims, DE; New England Patriots
- Mr. Irrelevant: Tim Washington, CB; San Francisco 49ers
- Most selections (17): Miami Dolphins; New England Patriots
- Fewest selections (5): San Diego Chargers
- Hall of Famers: 4: G Mike Munchak; RB Marcus Allen; LB Andre Tippett; PK Morten Andersen

The 1982 NFL draft was the procedure by which National Football League teams selected amateur college football players. It is officially known as the NFL Annual Player Selection Meeting. The draft was held April 27–28, 1982, at the New York Sheraton Hotel in New York City, New York. At the time of the draft the Raiders were still the Oakland Raiders, they relocated to Los Angeles in May 1982. The league also held a supplemental draft after the regular draft and before the regular season.

With the first overall pick of the draft, the New England Patriots selected defensive end Kenneth Sims.

== Player selections ==
= Pro Bowler	= Hall of Famer

*	= compensatory selection
†	= Pro Bowler
‡	= Hall of Famer

Positions key
Offense	Defense	Special teams
QB — Quarterback; RB — Running back; FB — Fullback; WR — Wide receiver; TE — Tight end; OL — Offensive lineman; T — Tackle; G — Guard; C — Center	DL — Defensive lineman; DT — Defensive tackle (Note: Includes nose tackle (NT)); DE — Defensive end; EDGE — Edge rusher; LB — Linebacker (Note: Includes middle linebacker (MLB/MIKE), weakside linebacker (WILL), strongside linebacker (SAM), off-ball linebacker, and outside linebacker (OLB)); DB — Defensive back; CB — Cornerback; S — Safety (Note: Includes free safety (FS) and strong safety (SS))	K — Kicker (Note: Also known as a placekicker (PK)); P — Punter; LS — Long snapper; RS — Return specialist (Note: Includes kickoff and punt returners)

=== Round 1–9 ===
Rnd.	Pick	Team	Player	Pos.	College	Notes
1	1	New England Patriots	Kenneth Sims	DE	Texas	
1	2	Baltimore Colts	Johnie Cooks	LB	Mississippi State	
1	–	New Orleans Saints	The New Orleans Saints forfeited their 1982 first round pick after selecting Dave Wilson in the 1981 supplemental draft.			
1	3	Cleveland Browns	Chip Banks ^{†}	LB	USC	
1	4	Baltimore Colts	Art Schlichter	QB	Ohio State	from L. A. Rams
1	5	Chicago Bears	Jim McMahon ^{†}	QB	BYU	
1	6	Seattle Seahawks	Jeff Bryant	DE	Clemson	
1	7	Minnesota Vikings	Darrin Nelson	RB	Stanford	
1	8	Houston Oilers	Mike Munchak^{‡}^{†}	G	Penn State	
1	9	Atlanta Falcons	Gerald Riggs ^{†}	RB	Arizona State	
1	10	Los Angeles Raiders	Marcus Allen^{‡}^{†}	RB	USC	Heisman Trophy winner
1	11	Kansas City Chiefs	Anthony Hancock	WR	Tennessee	from St. Louis
1	12	Pittsburgh Steelers	Walter Abercrombie	RB	Baylor	
1	13	New Orleans Saints	Lindsay Scott	WR	Georgia	from Green Bay via San Diego
1	14	Los Angeles Rams	Barry Redden	RB	Richmond	from Washington
1	15	Detroit Lions	Jimmy Williams	LB	Nebraska	
1	16	St. Louis Cardinals	Luis Sharpe ^{†}	T	UCLA	from Kansas City
1	17	Tampa Bay Buccaneers	Sean Farrell	G	Penn State	
1	18	New York Giants	Butch Woolfolk	RB	Michigan	
1	19	Buffalo Bills	Perry Tuttle	WR	Clemson	from Denver
1	20	Philadelphia Eagles	Mike Quick ^{†}	WR	NC State	
1	21	Denver Broncos	Gerald Willhite	RB	San Jose State	from Buffalo
1	22	Green Bay Packers	Ron Hallstrom	G	Iowa	from San Diego
1	23	New York Jets	Bob Crable	LB	Notre Dame	
1	24	Miami Dolphins	Roy Foster ^{†}	G	USC	
1	25	Dallas Cowboys	Rod Hill	CB	Kentucky State	
1	26	Cincinnati Bengals	Glen Collins	DE	Mississippi State	
1	27	New England Patriots	Lester Williams	NT	Miami (FL)	from San Francisco
2	28	Baltimore Colts	Leo Wisniewski	NT	Penn State	
2	29	San Francisco 49ers	William Paris	T	Michigan	from New England
2	30	New Orleans Saints	Brad Edelman ^{†}	G	Missouri	
2	31	Cleveland Browns	Keith Baldwin	DE	Texas A&M	
2	32	Tampa Bay Buccaneers	Booker Reese	DE	Bethune–Cookman	
2	33	Seattle Seahawks	Bruce Scholtz	LB	Texas	
2	34	Baltimore Colts	Rohn Stark ^{†}	P	Florida State	from L. A. Rams
2	35	Los Angeles Raiders	Jack Squirek	LB	Illinois	from Houston
2	36	Atlanta Falcons	Doug Rogers	DE	Stanford	
2	37	Los Angeles Raiders	Jim Romano	C	Penn State	
2	38	St. Louis Cardinals	David Galloway	DE	Florida	
2	39	Minnesota Vikings	Terry Tausch	G	Texas	
2	40	New England Patriots	Robert Weathers	RB	Arizona State	from Green Bay via San Diego
2	41	New England Patriots	Andre Tippett^{‡}^{†}	LB	Iowa	from Washington via San Francisco
2	42	Detroit Lions	Bobby Watkins	CB	Southwest Texas State	
2	43	Pittsburgh Steelers	John Meyer	T	Arizona State	
2	44	Houston Oilers	Oliver Luck	QB	West Virginia	from Tampa Bay via Miami and L. A. Rams
2	45	New York Giants	Joe Morris ^{†}	RB	Syracuse	
2	46	Kansas City Chiefs	Calvin Daniels	LB	North Carolina	
2	47	Philadelphia Eagles	Lawrence Sampleton	TE	Texas	
2	48	Buffalo Bills	Matt Kofler	QB	San Diego State	
2	49	Washington Redskins	Vernon Dean	CB	San Diego State	from San Diego via Los Angeles
2	50	Denver Broncos	Orlando McDaniel	WR	LSU	
2	51	New York Jets	Reggie McElroy	T	West Texas A&M	
2	52	Miami Dolphins	Mark Duper ^{†}	WR	Northwestern State	
2	53	Dallas Cowboys	Jeff Rohrer	LB	Yale	
2	54	Cincinnati Bengals	Emanuel Weaver	NT	South Carolina State	
2	55	New England Patriots	Darryl Haley	T	Utah	from San Francisco
3	56	New England Patriots	Cedric Jones	WR	Duke	
3	57	Baltimore Colts	Jim Burroughs	CB	Michigan State	
3	58	New Orleans Saints	Rodney Lewis	DB	Nebraska	
3	59	Buffalo Bills	Eugene Marve	LB	Saginaw Valley State	from Cleveland
3	60	New England Patriots	Clayton Weishuhn	LB	Angelo State	from Seattle
3	61	Washington Redskins	Carl Powell	WR	Jackson State	from L. A. Rams
3	62	Chicago Bears	Tim Wrightman	TE	UCLA	
3	63	Atlanta Falcons	Stacey Bailey	WR	San Jose State	
3	64	Los Angeles Raiders	Vann McElroy ^{†}	S	Baylor	
3	65	St. Louis Cardinals	Benny Perrin	S	Alabama	
3	66	New Orleans Saints	Eugene Goodlow	LB	Kansas State	from Minnesota
3	67	Los Angeles Rams	Bill Bechtold	C	Oklahoma	from Houston
3	68	New Orleans Saints	Kenny Duckett	WR	Wake Forest	from Washington
3	69	Detroit Lions	Steve Doig	LB	New Hampshire	
3	70	Pittsburgh Steelers	Mike Merriweather ^{†}	LB	Pacific	
3	71	Green Bay Packers	Del Rodgers	RB	Utah	
3	72	Houston Oilers	Stan Edwards	RB	Michigan	from N. Y. Giants
3	73	St. Louis Cardinals	Rusty Guilbeau	DE	McNeese State	from Kansas City
3	74	Tampa Bay Buccaneers	Jerry Ball	TE	Arizona State	
3	75	Seattle Seahawks	Pete Metzelaars	TE	Wabash	from Buffalo
3	76	New Orleans Saints	John Krimm	DB	Notre Dame	from San Diego
3	77	Houston Oilers	Robert Abraham	LB	NC State	from Denver via L. A. Rams
3	78	Philadelphia Eagles	Vyto Kab	TE	Penn State	
3	79	New York Jets	Dwayne Crutchfield	RB	Iowa State	
3	80	Miami Dolphins	Paul Lankford	CB	Penn State	
3	81	Dallas Cowboys	Jim Eliopulos	LB	Wyoming	
3	82	Cincinnati Bengals	Rodney Holman ^{†}	TE	Tulane	
3	83	Tampa Bay Buccaneers	John Cannon	DE	William & Mary	from San Francisco via San Diego
4	84	Baltimore Colts	Mike Pagel	QB	Arizona State	
4	85	New England Patriots	George Crump	DE	East Carolina	
4	86	New Orleans Saints	Morten Andersen^{‡}^{†}	K	Michigan State	
4	87	Cleveland Browns	Dwight Walker	WR	Nicholls State	
4	88	Los Angeles Rams	Jeff Gaylord	LB	Missouri	
4	89	Chicago Bears	Dennis Gentry	RB	Baylor	
4	90	St. Louis Cardinals	Tootie Robbins	T	East Carolina	from Seattle
4	91	Los Angeles Raiders	Ed Muransky	T	Michigan	
4	92	Minnesota Vikings	Jim Fahnhorst	LB	Minnesota	
4	93	Buffalo Bills	Van Williams	RB	Carson–Newman	from St. Louis
4	94	Houston Oilers	Steve Bryant	WR	Purdue	
4	95	Atlanta Falcons	Reggie Brown	RB	Oregon	
4	96	Detroit Lions	Bruce McNorton	CB	Georgetown (KY)	
4	97	Pittsburgh Steelers	Rick Woods	CB	Boise State	
4	98	Green Bay Packers	Robert Brown	LB	Virginia Tech	
4	99	Washington Redskins	Todd Liebenstein	DE	UNLV	
4	100	Kansas City Chiefs	Louis Haynes	LB	North Texas State	
4	101	Dallas Cowboys	Brian Carpenter	CB	Michigan	from Tampa Bay
4	102	New York Giants	Gerry Raymond	G	Boston College	
4	103	Tampa Bay Buccaneers	Dave Barrett	RB	Houston	from San Diego
4	104	Kansas City Chiefs	Stuart Anderson	LB	Virginia	from Denver
4	105	Philadelphia Eagles	Anthony Griggs	LB	Ohio State	
4	106	Denver Broncos	Dan Plater	WR	BYU	from Buffalo
4	107	New York Jets	George Floyd	DB	Eastern Kentucky	
4	108	Miami Dolphins	Charles Bowser	LB	Duke	
4	109	Dallas Cowboys	Monty Hunter	S	Salem	
4	110	Cincinnati Bengals	Rodney Tate	RB	Texas	
4	111	New England Patriots	Brian Ingram	LB	Tennessee	
5	112	New England Patriots	Fred Marion ^{†}	S	Miami (FL)	
5	113	Baltimore Colts	Terry Crouch	G	Oklahoma	
5	114	New Orleans Saints	Tony Elliott	DE	North Texas State	
5	115	Cleveland Browns	Mike Baab	C	Texas	
5	116	Chicago Bears	Perry Hartnett	T	SMU	
5	117	Los Angeles Rams	Wally Kersten	T	Minnesota	from Seattle
5	118	Los Angeles Rams	Doug Barnett	DE	Azusa Pacific	
5	119	St. Louis Cardinals	Vance Bedford	DE	Texas	
5	120	Miami Dolphins	Bob Nelson	DT	Miami (FL)	from Minnesota
5	121	Houston Oilers	Malcolm Taylor	DE	Tennessee State	
5	122	Atlanta Falcons	Von Mansfield	CB	Wisconsin	
5	123	Los Angeles Raiders	Ed Jackson	LB	Louisiana Tech	
5	124	Pittsburgh Steelers	Ken Dallafior	T	Minnesota	
5	125	St. Louis Cardinals	Earl Ferrell	RB	East Tennessee State	from Washington
5	126	Green Bay Packers	Mike Meade	RB	Penn State	
5	127	Detroit Lions	William Graham	S	Texas	
5	128	Tampa Bay Buccaneers	Jeff Davis	LB	Clemson	
5	129	New York Giants	Rich Umphrey	C	Colorado	
5	130	Kansas City Chiefs	Del Thompson	RB	UTEP	
5	131	Denver Broncos	Sammy Winder ^{†}	RB	Southern Miss	
5	132	Philadelphia Eagles	Dennis DeVaughn	DB	Bishop	
5	133	Washington Redskins	Mike Williams	TE	Alabama A&M	from Buffalo
5	134	Chicago Bears	Dennis Tabron	DB	Duke	from San Diego
5	135	New York Jets	Mark Jerue	LB	Washington	
5	136	Miami Dolphins	Rich Diana	RB	Yale	
5	137	Dallas Cowboys	Phil Pozderac	T	Notre Dame	
5	138	Cincinnati Bengals	Paul Sorensen	DB	Washington State	
5	139	San Francisco 49ers	Newton Williams	RB	Arizona State	
6	140	Baltimore Colts	Pat Beach	TE	Washington State	
6	141	New England Patriots	Ricky Smith	DB	Alabama State	
6	142	New Orleans Saints	Marvin Lewis	RB	Tulane	
6	143	Dallas Cowboys	Ken Hammond	G	Vanderbilt	from Cleveland
6	144	Seattle Seahawks	Jack Campbell	T	Utah	
6	145	Los Angeles Rams	Kerry Locklin	TE	New Mexico State	
6	146	Chicago Bears	Kurt Becker	G	Michigan	
6	147	Minnesota Vikings	Greg Storr	LB	Boston College	
6	148	Houston Oilers	Gary Allen	RB	Hawaii	
6	149	Atlanta Falcons	Mike Kelley	QB	Georgia Tech	
6	150	St. Louis Cardinals	Craig Shaffer	LB	Indiana State	
6	151	San Francisco 49ers	Vince Williams	RB	Oregon	from L. A. Raiders
6	152	Green Bay Packers	Chet Parlavecchio	LB	Penn State	
6	153	Washington Redskins	Lemont Holt Jeffers	LB	Tennessee	
6	154	Detroit Lions	Mike Machurek	QB	Idaho State	
6	155	Pittsburgh Steelers	Mike Perko	DT	Utah State	
6	156	New York Giants	Darrell Nicholson	LB	North Carolina	
6	157	Kansas City Chiefs	Durwood Roquemore	CB	Texas A&I	
6	158	Tampa Bay Buccaneers	Andre Tyler	WR	Stanford	
6	159	Philadelphia Eagles	Curt Grieve	WR	Yale	
6	160	Buffalo Bills	DeWayne Chivers	TE	South Carolina	
6	161	Miami Dolphins	Tom Tutson	DB	South Carolina State	from San Diego
6	162	Cleveland Browns	Mike Whitwell	WR	Texas A&M	from Denver
6	163	New York Jets	Lonell Phea	WR	Houston	
6	164	Miami Dolphins	Ron Hester	LB	Florida State	
6	165	Dallas Cowboys	Charles Daum	DT	Cal Poly-San Luis Obispo	
6	166	Cincinnati Bengals	Arthur King	DE	Grambling State	
6	167	Pittsburgh Steelers	Craig Bingham	LB	Syracuse	from San Francisco via New Orleans
7	168	New England Patriots	Jeff Roberts	LB	Tulane	
7	169	Baltimore Colts	Fletcher Jenkins	DT	Washington	
7	170	Miami Dolphins	Dan Johnson	TE	Iowa State	from New Orleans
7	171	Buffalo Bills	Gary Anderson ^{†}	K	Syracuse	from Cleveland
7	172	Pittsburgh Steelers	Edmund Nelson	DT	Auburn	from L. A. Rams
7	173	Chicago Bears	Henry Waechter	DT	Nebraska	
7	174	Seattle Seahawks	Eugene Williams	LB	Tulsa	
7	175	Detroit Lions	Phil Bates	RB	Nebraska	from Houston
7	176	Atlanta Falcons	David Toloumu	RB	Hawaii	
7	177	Los Angeles Raiders	Jeff Jackson	DE	Toledo	
7	178	St. Louis Cardinals	Bob Sebro	C	Colorado	
7	179	Minnesota Vikings	Steve Jordan ^{†}	TE	Brown	
7	180	Washington Redskins	John Schachtner	LB	Northern Arizona	
7	181	Los Angeles Rams	Joe Shearin	G	Texas	
7	182	Pittsburgh Steelers	Emil Boures	C	Pittsburgh	
7	183	Green Bay Packers	Joey Whitley	DB	UTEP	
7	184	Kansas City Chiefs	Greg Smith	DT	Kansas	
7	185	Tampa Bay Buccaneers	Tom Morris	DB	Michigan State	
7	186	New York Giants	Tom Wiska	G	Michigan State	
7	187	Detroit Lions	Victor Simmons	WR	Oregon State	from Buffalo via L. A. Rams
7	188	San Diego Chargers	Hollis Hall	DB	Clemson	
7	189	Denver Broncos	Alvin Ruben	DE	Houston	
7	190	Philadelphia Eagles	Harvey Armstrong	DT	SMU	
7	191	New York Jets	Tom Coombs	TE	Idaho	
7	192	Miami Dolphins	Larry Cowan	RB	Jackson State	
7	193	Dallas Cowboys	Bill Purifoy	DE	Tulsa	
7	194	Cincinnati Bengals	Ben Needham	LB	Michigan	
7	195	San Francisco 49ers	Ron Ferrari	LB	Illinois	
8	196	Baltimore Colts	Tony Loia	G	Arizona State	
8	197	New England Patriots	Ken Collins	LB	Washington State	
8	198	New Orleans Saints	Chuck Slaughter	T	South Carolina	
8	199	Cleveland Browns	Mark Kafentzis	DB	Hawaii	
8	200	Chicago Bears	Jerry Doerger	T	Wisconsin	
8	201	Seattle Seahawks	Chester Cooper	WR	Minnesota	
8	202	Los Angeles Rams	A. J. Jones	RB	Texas	
8	203	Atlanta Falcons	Ricky Eberhart	DB	Morris Brown	
8	204	Cleveland Browns	Van Heflin	TE	Vanderbilt	
8	205	St. Louis Cardinals	Chris Lindstrom	DT	Boston University	
8	206	Minnesota Vikings	Kirk Harmon	LB	Pacific	
8	207	Los Angeles Rams	Mike Reilly	LB	Oklahoma	
8	208	Detroit Lions	Martin Moss	DE	UCLA	
8	209	Pittsburgh Steelers	John Goodson	P	Texas	
8	210	Green Bay Packers	Thomas Boyd	LB	Alabama	
8	211	Cleveland Browns	Bill Jackson	DB	North Carolina	
8	212	Tampa Bay Buccaneers	Kelvin Atkins	LB	Illinois	
8	213	New York Giants	Robert Hubble	TE	Rice	
8	214	Kansas City Chiefs	Case deBruijn	P	Idaho State	
8	215	San Diego Chargers	Maury Buford	P	Texas Tech	
8	216	Dallas Cowboys	George Peoples	RB	Auburn	
8	217	Philadelphia Eagles	Jim Fritzche	T	Purdue	
8	218	Buffalo Bills	Luc Tousignant	QB	Fairmont State	
8	219	Buffalo Bills	Lawrence Texada	RB	Henderson State	
8	220	Miami Dolphins	Tate Randle	DB	Texas Tech	
8	221	Dallas Cowboys	Dwight Sullivan	RB	NC State	
8	222	Cincinnati Bengals	Kari Yli-Renko	T	Cincinnati	
8	223	Washington Redskins	Ralph Warthen	DT	Gardner–Webb	
9	224	New England Patriots	Kelvin Murdock	WR	Troy State	
9	225	Baltimore Colts	Tony Berryhill	C	Clemson	
9	226	Washington Redskins	Ken Coffey	DB	Southwest Texas State	
9	227	Cleveland Browns	Milton Baker	TE	West Texas State	
9	228	Seattle Seahawks	David Jefferson	LB	Miami (FL)	
9	229	Los Angeles Rams	Bob Speight	T	Boston University	
9	230	Chicago Bears	Mike Hatchett	DB	Texas	
9	231	Detroit Lions	Dan Wagoner	DB	Kansas	
9	232	St. Louis Cardinals	Darnell Dailey	LB	Maryland	
9	233	Minnesota Vikings	Bryan Howard	DB	Tennessee State	
9	234	Houston Oilers	Matt Bradley	DB	Penn State	
9	235	Atlanta Falcons	Mike Horan ^{†}	P	Long Beach State	
9	236	Pittsburgh Steelers	Mike Hirn	TE	Central Michigan	
9	237	Green Bay Packers	Charles Riggins	DE	Bethune–Cookman	
9	238	Washington Redskins	Randy Trautman	DT	Boise State	
9	239	Miami Dolphins	Steve Clark	DE	Utah	
9	240	New York Giants	John Higgins	DB	UNLV	
9	241	Kansas City Chiefs	Lyndle Byford	T	Oklahoma	
9	242	Tampa Bay Buccaneers	Bob Lane	QB	Northeast Louisiana	
9	243	Denver Broncos	Keith Uecker	T	Auburn	
9	244	Philadelphia Eagles	Tony Woodruff	WR	Fresno State	
9	245	Buffalo Bills	Dennis Edwards	DT	USC	
9	246	San Diego Chargers	Warren Lyles	DT	Alabama	
9	247	New York Jets	Rocky Klever	RB	Montana	
9	248	Miami Dolphins	Mack Boatner	RB	Southeastern Louisiana	
9	249	Dallas Cowboys	Joe Gary	DT	UCLA	
9	250	Cincinnati Bengals	James Bennett	WR	Northwestern State	
9	251	San Francisco 49ers	Bryan Clark	QB	Michigan State	

=== Round 10 ===
Pick #	NFL team	Player	Position	College
252	Baltimore Colts	Tom Deery	Safety	Widener
253	New England Patriots	Brian Clark	Kicker	Florida
254	Washington Redskins	Harold Smith	Defensive end	Kentucky State
255	Cleveland Browns	Ricky Floyd	Running back	Southern Mississippi
256	Los Angeles Rams	Miles McPherson	Defensive back	New Haven
257	Chicago Bears	Joe Turner	Defensive back	USC
258	Seattle Seahawks	Craig Austin	Linebacker	South Dakota
259	St. Louis Cardinals	Eddie McGill	Tight end	Western Carolina
260	Minnesota Vikings	Gerald Lucear	Wide receiver Did not play	Temple
261	Houston Oilers	Ron Reeves	Quarterback	Texas Tech
262	Atlanta Falcons	Curtis Stowers	Linebacker	Mississippi State
263	Los Angeles Raiders	Rich D'Amico	Linebacker	Penn State
264	Green Bay Packers	Eddie Garcia	Kicker	Southern Methodist
265	Washington Redskins	Terry Daniels	Defensive back	Tennessee
266	Detroit Lions	Roosevelt Barnes	Linebacker	Purdue
267	Pittsburgh Steelers	Sal Sunseri	Linebacker	Pittsburgh
268	Kansas City Chiefs	Larry Brodsky	Wide receiver	Miami (FL)
269	San Francisco 49ers	Dana McLemore	Defensive back	Hawaii
270	New York Giants	Rich Baldinger	Tackle	Wake Forest
271	Miami Dolphins	Robin Fisher	Linebacker	Florida
272	Buffalo Bills	Vic James	Defensive back	Colorado
273	San Diego Chargers	Andre Young	Defensive back	Louisiana Tech
274	Denver Broncos	Ken Woodard	Linebacker	Tuskegee
275	New York Jets	Darryl Hemphill	Defensive back	West Texas State
276	Miami Dolphins	Wayne Jones	Tackle	Utah
277	Dallas Cowboys	Todd Eckerson	Tackle	North Carolina State
278	Cincinnati Bengals	Larry Hogue	Defensive back	Utah State
279	San Francisco 49ers	Tim Barbian	Defensive tackle	Western Illinois

=== Round 11 ===
Pick #	NFL team	Player	Position	College
---	New England Patriots	The New England Patriots forfeited their 1982 11th round pick after selecting Chy Davidson in the 1981 supplemental draft		
280	Baltimore Colts	Lamont Meacham	Defensive back	Western Kentucky
281	Washington Redskins	Dan Miller	Kicker	Miami (FL)
282	Cleveland Browns	Steve Michuta	Quarterback	Grand Valley State
283	Chicago Bears	Guy Boliaux	Linebacker	Wisconsin
284	Seattle Seahawks	Sam Clancy	Defensive end	Pittsburgh (never played college football, was a basketball standout)
285	Los Angeles Rams	Ricky Coffman	Wide receiver	UCLA
286	Minnesota Vikings	Curtis Rouse	Guard	Tennessee-Chattanooga
287	Houston Oilers	Jim Campbell	Tight end	Kentucky
288	Atlanta Falcons	Jeff Keller	Wide receiver	Washington State
289	Los Angeles Raiders	Willie Turner	Wide receiver	Louisiana State
290	St. Louis Cardinals	James Williams	Defensive end	North Carolina A&T
291	Washington Redskins	Bob Holly	Quarterback	Princeton
292	Detroit Lions	Edward Lee	Wide receiver	South Carolina State
293	Pittsburgh Steelers	Mikal Abdul-Saboor	Guard	Morgan State
294	Green Bay Packers	John Macaulay	Center	Stanford
295	Dallas Cowboys	George Thompson	Wide receiver	Albany State
296	New England Patriots	Steve Sandon	Quarterback	Northern Iowa
297	Kansas City Chiefs	Bob Carter	Wide receiver	Arizona
298	Buffalo Bills	Frank Kalil	Guard	Arizona
299	San Diego Chargers	Anthony Watson	Defensive back	New Mexico State
300	Denver Broncos	Stuart Yatsko	Guard	Oregon
301	Philadelphia Eagles	Ron Ingram	Wide receiver	Oklahoma State
302	New York Jets	Perry Parmelee	Wide receiver	Santa Clara
303	Miami Dolphins	Gary Crum	Tackle	Wyoming
304	Dallas Cowboys	Michael Whiting	Running back	Florida State
305	Cincinnati Bengals	Russell Davis	Running back	Idaho
306	San Francisco 49ers	Gary Gibson	Linebacker	Arizona

=== Round 12 ===
Pick #	NFL team	Player	Position	College
307	Baltimore Colts	Johnnie Wright	Running back	South Carolina
308	New England Patriots	Greg Taylor	Wide receiver	Virginia
309	Washington Redskins	Donald Laster	Tackle	Tennessee State
310	Cleveland Browns	Scott Nicolas	Linebacker	Miami (FL)
311	Seattle Seahawks	Frank Naylor	Center	Rutgers
312	Los Angeles Rams	Raymond Coley	Defensive tackle	Alabama A&M
313	Chicago Bears	Ricky Young	Linebacker	Oklahoma State
314	Houston Oilers	Donnie Craft	Running back	Louisville
315	Atlanta Falcons	Dave Levenick	Linebacker	Wisconsin
316	Los Angeles Raiders	Randy Smith	Wide receiver	East Texas State
317	St. Louis Cardinals	Bob Atha	Kicker	Ohio State
318	Minnesota Vikings	Bill Busarello	Running back	Glassboro St
319	Detroit Lions	Ricky Porter	Running back	Slippery Rock
320	Pittsburgh Steelers	Al Hughes	Defensive end	Western Michigan
321	Green Bay Packers	Phil Epps	Wide receiver	Texas Christian
322	Washington Redskins	Jeff Goff	Linebacker	Arkansas
323	New York Giants	Mark Seale	Defensive tackle	Richmond
324	Kansas City Chiefs	Mike Miller	Defensive back	Southwest Texas State
325	Tampa Bay Buccaneers	Michael Morton	Running back	UNLV
326	Detroit Lions	Rob Rubick	Tight end	Grand Valley State
327	Denver Broncos	Brian Clark	Guard	Clemson
328	Philadelphia Eagles	Rob Taylor	Tackle	Northwestern
329	Buffalo Bills	Tony Suber	Defensive tackle	Gardner-Webb
330	New York Jets	Tom Carlstrom	Guard	Nebraska
331	Miami Dolphins	Mike Rodrigue	Wide receiver	Miami (FL)
332	Dallas Cowboys	Rich Burtness	Guard	Montana
333	Cincinnati Bengals	Dan Feraday	Quarterback	Toronto
334	San Francisco 49ers	Tim Washington	Defensive back	Fresno State

= Pro Bowler	= Hall of Famer

== Supplemental draft ==
Rnd.	Pick	Team	Player	Pos.	College	Notes
9		Detroit Lions	Kevin Robinson	DB	North Carolina A&T	

== Hall of Famers ==
- Mike Munchak, guard from Pennsylvania State, taken 1st round 8th overall by Houston Oilers

Inducted: Professional Football Hall of Fame class of 2001.

- Marcus Allen, running back from Southern California, taken 1st round 10th overall by Los Angeles Raiders

Inducted: Professional Football Hall of Fame class of 2003.

- Andre Tippett, linebacker from Iowa, taken 2nd round 41st overall by New England Patriots

Inducted: Professional Football Hall of Fame class of 2008.

- Morten Andersen, kicker from Michigan State, taken 4th round 86th overall by New Orleans Saints

Inducted: Professional Football Hall of Fame class of 2017.

== Notable undrafted players ==
^{†}	=Pro Bowler

Original NFL team	Player	Pos.	College	Notes
Atlanta Falcons	William Curran	WR	UCLA	
Atlanta Falcons	Mike Kennedy	DB	Toledo	
Atlanta Falcons	Scott Norwood ^{†}	K	James Madison	
Baltimore Colts	Bernard Henry	WR	Arizona State	
Buffalo Bills	Nolan Franz	WR	Tulane	
Buffalo Bills	Joey Lumpkin	LB	Arizona State	
Chicago Bears	Calvin Thomas	RB	Illinois	
Dallas Cowboys	Brian Baldinger	G	Duke	
Dallas Cowboys	Dave Finzer	P	DePauw	
Denver Broncos	Darren Comeaux	LB	Arizona State	
Denver Broncos	Roger Jackson	DB	Bethune–Cookman	
Green Bay Packers	Bill Cherry	C	Middle Tennessee State	
Green Bay Packers	Larry Rubens	LB	Montana State	
Kansas City Chiefs	Robert Blakley	WR	North Dakota State	
Los Angeles Raiders	Mike Durrette	DE	West Virginia	
Los Angeles Rams	Kyle Whittingham	LB	BYU	
New England Patriots	Tim Golden	LB	Florida	
New England Patriots	Mike Kerrigan	QB	Northwestern	
New England Patriots	Dennis Owens	DT	NC State	
New York Giants	Floyd Eddings	WR	California	
New York Giants	John Fourcade	QB	Ole Miss	
New York Giants	Sylvester McGrew	DT	Tulane	
New York Giants	Jerome Sally	DT	Missouri	
New York Jets	Eric Truvillion	WR	Florida A&M	
Philadelphia Eagles	Brian Franco	K	Penn State	
Philadelphia Eagles	Jeff Rodenberger	RB	Maryland	
Pittsburgh Steelers	Fred Bohannon	S	Mississippi Valley State	
Pittsburgh Steelers	John Rodgers	TE	Louisiana Tech	
Pittsburgh Steelers	Willie Sydnor	WR	Syracuse	
Pittsburgh Steelers	Craig Walls	LB	Indiana	
Pittsburgh Steelers	Sam Washington	CB	Mississippi Valley State	
Pittsburgh Steelers	Keith Willis	DE	Northeastern	
San Diego Chargers	Don Brown	T	Santa Clara	
San Diego Chargers	Dennis McKnight	G	Drake	
San Francisco 49ers	Frank Frazier	G	Miami (FL)	
San Francisco 49ers	Renaldo Nehemiah	WR	Maryland	
San Francisco 49ers	Jeff Stover	DE	Oregon	
Seattle Seahawks	Mike Hagen	FB	Montana	
Seattle Seahawks	Norm Johnson ^{†}	K	UCLA	
Seattle Seahawks	Kani Kauahi	C	Hawaii	
Seattle Seahawks	Joe Nash ^{†}	DT	Boston College	
Seattle Seahawks	Shelton Robinson	LB	North Carolina	
Seattle Seahawks	Byron Walker	WR	The Citadel	
Tampa Bay Buccaneers	Sandy LaBeaux	CB	Cal State Hayward	
