= 1981 Holiday Bowl =

Washington State Cougars	BYU Cougars
(8–2-1)	(10–2)
Pac-10	WAC
36	38
Head coach: Jim Walden	Head coach: LaVell Edwards
AP / Coaches; 20 / 18	AP / Coaches; 14 / 12
	1	2	3	4	Total
Washington State	0	7	21	8	36
BYU	7	17	7	7	38
- Date: December 18, 1981
- Season: 1981
- Stadium: Jack Murphy Stadium
- Location: San Diego, California
- MVP: Jim McMahon (QB, BYU); Kyle Whittingham (LB, BYU)
- Favorite: BYU by 3 points
- Referee: Jack Gatto (PCAA)
- Halftime show: Marching bands
- Attendance: 52,419
- Payout: US$286,179 per team

United States TV coverage
- Network: ESPN, Mizlou

The 1981 Holiday Bowl was a college football bowl game played on December 18 in San Diego, California. It was part of the 1981 NCAA Division I-A football season, and was the fourth edition of the Holiday Bowl. The Friday night game was the third of sixteen games in this bowl season and featured the #20 Washington State Cougars of the Pac-10 Conference, and the 14th-ranked BYU Cougars, champions of the Western Athletic Conference.

It was the first bowl appearance in 51 years for Washington State, who used a two-quarterback system: junior Clete Casper was the passer and sophomore Ricky Turner the runner. Meanwhile, it was the fourth straight year in the Holiday Bowl for BYU. BYU's quarterback was consensus All-American and future Super Bowl champion Jim McMahon, the fifth overall pick of the 1982 NFL draft. He was backed up by sophomore Steve Young, a future member of the Pro Football Hall of Fame and also a Super Bowl champion.

== Game summary ==
Favored BYU scored first on a 35-yard pass from McMahon to Dan Plater, the only scoring of the first quarter. McMahon threw a 7-yard pass to Gordon Hudson to increase BYU's lead to 14–0. Washington State got on the board after quarterback Turner scored on a two-yard run. BYU's Kurt Gunther kicked a 20-yard field goal and Waymon Hamilton ran in from a yard out to give BYU a 24–7 lead at halftime.

Early in the third quarter, BYU cornerback Tom Holmoe intercepted a Casper pass and returned it 35 yards for a touchdown, but WSU scored three unanswered touchdowns. Running back Matt LaBonne scored on an 18-yard run, Robert Williams scored on a 5-yard run, and Turner scored again on a 13-yard run to close the BYU lead to three points (31–28) at the end of the third quarter.

McMahon fired an 11-yard touchdown pass to Scott Pettis to take the lead back to ten points at 38–28. WSU fullback Mike Martin scored from a yard out and Turner added a 2-point conversion to close the gap to two points (38–36) with five minutes remaining. Late in the game, McMahon fumbled a third-down snap but picked up the ball and ran for a first down that helped to clinch the victory for BYU.

The players of the game, both from BYU, were McMahon and middle linebacker Kyle Whittingham, the future head coach at Utah. BYU evened its record in the bowl at 2–2, and played in the next three.

BYU moved up one spot to thirteenth in the final AP poll, and Washington State slipped out of the top twenty; their next bowl appearance was seven years later.

== Scoring ==
First quarter

- BYU – Dan Plater 35 pass from Jim McMahon (Kurt Gunther kick)

Second quarter

- BYU – Gordon Hudson 4 pass from McMahon (Gunther kick)
- WSU – Ricky Turner 4 run (Ward Leland kick)
- BYU – Field goal, Gunther 20
- BYU – Waymon Hamilton 1 run (Gunther kick)

Third quarter

- BYU – Tom Holmoe 35 interception return (Gunther kick)
- WSU – Matt LaBomme 18 run (Pat Beach pass from Clete Casper)
- WSU – Robert Williams 5 run (pass failed)
- WSU – Turner 13 run (Leland kick)

Fourth quarter

- BYU – Scott Pettis 11 pass from McMahon (Gunther kick)
- WSU – Mike Martin 1 run (Turner run)

== Statistics ==
Statistics	WSU	BYU
First downs	23	22
Rushes–yards	53-245	32-69
Passing yards	106	368
Passes	8-25-2	28–44–0
Total yards	351	437
Punts–average	8–41	8–37
Fumbles–lost	0–0	5–0
Turnovers by	2	0
Penalties-yards	5-45	9-86
