= 1981 Washington State Cougars football team =

American college football season

1981 Washington State Cougars football
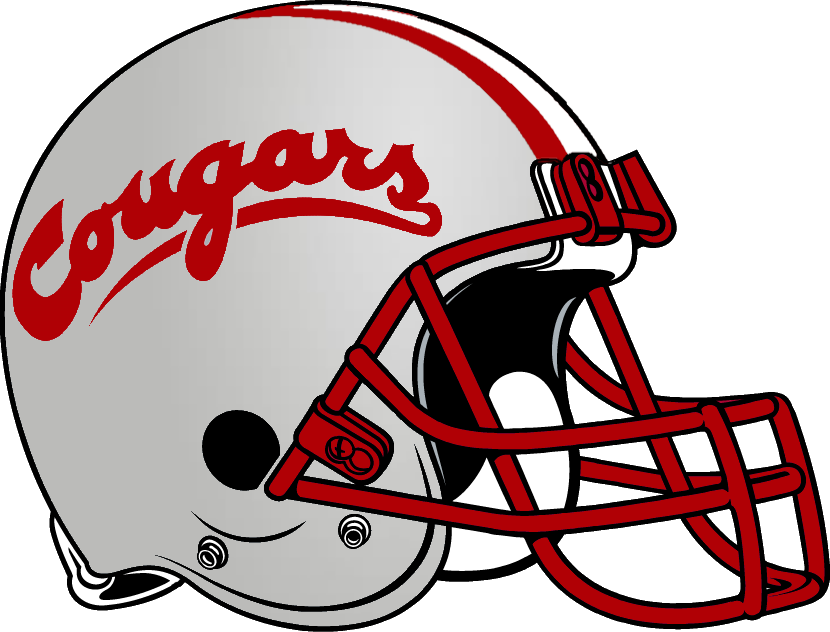

Holiday Bowl, L 36–38 vs. BYU
- Conference: Pacific-10 Conference
- Record: 8–3–1 (5–2–1 Pac-10)
- Head coach: Jim Walden (4th season)
- Offensive coordinator: Pat Ruel (2nd season)
- Defensive coordinator: Bob Padilla (2nd season)
- Home stadium: Martin Stadium; Joe Albi Stadium

1981 Pacific-10 Conference football standings
	Conf.					Overall
Team	W		L		T	W		L		T
No. 10 Washington $	6	–	2	–	0	10	–	2	–	0
No. 16 Arizona State	5	–	2	–	0	9	–	2	–	0
No. 14 USC	5	–	2	–	0	9	–	3	–	0
Washington State	5	–	2	–	1	8	–	3	–	1
UCLA	5	–	2	–	1	7	–	4	–	1
Arizona	4	–	4	–	0	6	–	5	–	0
Stanford	4	–	4	–	0	4	–	7	–	0
California	2	–	6	–	0	2	–	9	–	0
Oregon	1	–	6	–	0	2	–	9	–	0
Oregon State	0	–	7	–	0	1	–	10	–	0
$ – Conference champion; Rankings from AP Poll

The 1981 Washington State Cougars football team was an American football team that represented Washington State University in the Pacific-10 Conference (Pac-10) during the 1981 NCAA Division I-A football season. In their fourth season under head coach Jim Walden, the Cougars compiled an 8–3–1 record (5–2–1 in Pac-10, tied for fourth), and outscored their opponents 297 to 197.

The team's statistical leaders included Clete Casper with 939 passing yards, Tim Harris with 915 rushing yards, and Jeff Keller with 495 receiving yards.

The Cougars entered the Apple Cup with an 8–1–1 record and a win over Washington at Husky Stadium would clinch the Pac-10 title and a Rose Bowl berth, their first in 51 years. The Huskies prevailed again at home, and then shut out Iowa in the Rose Bowl.

The Cougars went to the Holiday Bowl in San Diego, and lost a close, entertaining game to Brigham Young of the WAC, led by consensus All-American quarterback Jim McMahon, the fifth overall selection of the 1982 NFL draft.

== Schedule ==
Date	Opponent	Rank	Site	TV	Result	Attendance	Source
September 12	Montana State*		Joe Albi Stadium; Spokane, WA		W 33–21	23,721	
September 19	at Colorado*		Folsom Field; Boulder, CO		W 14–10	35,277	
September 26	No. 18 Arizona State		Martin Stadium; Pullman, WA		W 24–21	24,481	
October 3	Pacific (CA)*		Martin Stadium; Pullman, WA		W 31–0	17,923	
October 10	at Oregon State		Parker Stadium; Corvallis, OR		W 23–0	32,500	
October 17	UCLA	No. 18	Martin Stadium; Pullman, WA	ABC	T 17–17	40,000	
October 24	at Arizona	No. 16	Arizona Stadium; Tucson, AZ		W 34–19	50,265	
October 31	at No. 4 USC	No. 14	Los Angeles Memorial Coliseum; Los Angeles, CA		L 17–41	60,972	
November 7	Oregon		Martin Stadium; Pullman, WA		W 39–7	33,500	
November 14	California	No. 17	Joe Albi Stadium; Spokane, WA		W 19–0	31,000	
November 21	at No. 17 Washington	No. 14	Husky Stadium; Seattle, WA (Apple Cup)		L 10–23	60,234	
December 18	vs. No. 14 BYU*	No. 20	Jack Murphy Stadium; San Diego, CA (Holiday Bowl)		L 36–38	52,419	
*Non-conference game; Rankings from AP Poll released prior to the game

== Roster ==
1981 Washington State Cougars football team roster
Players
Coaches
Offense

Pos.	#	Name	Class
TE	89	Pat Beach	Sr
QB	9	Clete Casper	Jr
FL	87	Paul Escalera	Sr
OT	60	Charlie Flager	Jr
RB	43	Tim Harris	Jr
SE	88	Jeff Keller	Sr
G	55	Mark McKay	Sr
SE	2	Cameron Mitchell	Sr
G	63	Gary Patrick	Jr
QB	17	Mark Rypien	Fr
C	51	Steve Sebahar	Jr
OT	72	Kevin Sloan	Jr
QB	12	Ricky Turner	So
RB	42	Robert Williams	Jr

Defense

Pos.	#	Name	Class
LB	96	Lee Blakeney	So
CB	30	Nate Bradley	Sr
DT	95	Ken Collins	Sr
DT	73	Matt Elisara	Sr
LB	18	Mark Pleis	Jr
LB	34	Ken Emmil	Jr
CB	41	Jeff Files	Sr
CB	6	Bill Gribble	Sr
DT	93	Keith Millard	So
FS	48	Peter Shaw	Sr
FS	28	Paul Sorensen	Sr
SS	44	John West	Sr
LB	57	Brent White	Jr

Special teams

Pos.	#	Name	Class
LS	89	Pat Beach	Sr
P	16	Tim Davey	Sr
H	6	Bill Gribble	Sr
K	4	Ward Leland

Head coach

- Jim Walden (4th year)

Coordinators/assistant coaches

- Pat Ruel – (OC)
- Bob Padilla – (DC)
- John Daniels
- Dave Elliott
- Gary Gagnon
- Lindsay Hughes
- Steve Morton
- Mel Sanders
- Harold Wheeler
- Ken Woody

Legend

- (C) Team captain
- (S) Suspended
- (I) Ineligible
- Injured
- Redshirt

== NFL draft ==
Four Cougars were selected in the 1982 NFL draft.

Player	Position	Round	Overall	Franchise
Paul Sorensen	DB	5	138	Cincinnati Bengals
Pat Beach	TE	6	140	Baltimore Colts
Ken Collins	LB	8	197	New England Patriots
Jeff Keller	WR	11	246	Atlanta Falcons
