= 1981 Washington Huskies football team =

American college football season

1981 Washington Huskies football

Pac-10 champion Rose Bowl champion

Rose Bowl, W 28–0 vs. Iowa
- Conference: Pacific-10 Conference

Ranking
- Coaches: No. 7
- AP: No. 10
- Record: 10–2 (6–2 Pac-10)
- Head coach: Don James (7th season)
- Offensive coordinator: Bob Stull (3rd season)
- Defensive coordinator: Jim Lambright (4th season)
- MVP: Mark Jerue
- Captains: James Carter; Vince Coby; Fletcher Jenkins; Mark Jerue
- Home stadium: Husky Stadium

1981 Pacific-10 Conference football standings
	Conf.					Overall
Team	W		L		T	W		L		T
No. 10 Washington $	6	–	2	–	0	10	–	2	–	0
No. 16 Arizona State	5	–	2	–	0	9	–	2	–	0
No. 14 USC	5	–	2	–	0	9	–	3	–	0
Washington State	5	–	2	–	1	8	–	3	–	1
UCLA	5	–	2	–	1	7	–	4	–	1
Arizona	4	–	4	–	0	6	–	5	–	0
Stanford	4	–	4	–	0	4	–	7	–	0
California	2	–	6	–	0	2	–	9	–	0
Oregon	1	–	6	–	0	2	–	9	–	0
Oregon State	0	–	7	–	0	1	–	10	–	0
$ – Conference champion; Rankings from AP Poll

The 1981 Washington Huskies football team was an American football team that represented the University of Washington during the 1981 NCAA Division I-A football season. In its seventh season under head coach Don James, the team compiled a 10–2 record, finished first in the Pacific-10 Conference, shut out Iowa in the Rose Bowl, and outscored its opponents 281 to 171.

Linebacker Mark Jerue was selected as the team's most valuable player; Jerue, James Carter, Vince Coby, and Fletcher Jenkins were the team captains.

== Schedule ==
Date	Opponent	Rank	Site	TV	Result	Attendance	Source
September 12	Pacific (CA)*	No. 17	Husky Stadium; Seattle, WA		W 34–14	45,134	
September 19	Kansas State*	No. 15	Husky Stadium; Seattle, WA		W 20–3	52,343	
September 26	at Oregon	No. 16	Autzen Stadium; Eugene, OR (rivalry)		W 17–3	40,685	
October 3	Arizona State	No. 12	Husky Stadium; Seattle, WA		L 7–26	50,410	
October 10	at California		California Memorial Stadium; Berkeley, CA		W 27–26	33,600	
October 17	Oregon State		Husky Stadium; Seattle, WA		W 56–17	52,324	
October 24	at Texas Tech*		Jones Stadium; Lubbock, TX		W 14–7	36,335	
October 31	Stanford	No. 18	Husky Stadium; Seattle, WA		W 42–31	53,504	
November 7	at UCLA	No. 16	Los Angeles Memorial Coliseum; Los Angeles, CA		L 0–31	41,818	
November 14	No. 3 USC		Husky Stadium; Seattle, WA		W 13–3	47,347	
November 21	No. 14 Washington State	No. 17	Husky Stadium; Seattle, WA (Apple Cup)		W 23–10	60,052	
January 1, 1982	vs. No. 13 Iowa*	No. 12	Rose Bowl; Pasadena, CA (Rose Bowl)	NBC	W 28–0	105,611	
*Non-conference game; Rankings from AP Poll released prior to the game; Source:

== Game summaries ==
=== Washington State ===
#14 Washington State at #17 Washington

Team	1	2	3	4	Total
Cougars	0	7	3	0	10
• Huskies	0	10	10	3	23

- Date: Saturday, November 21
- Location: Husky Stadium, Seattle, Washington
- Game start: 1:30 pm PST
- Game attendance: 60,052
- Game weather: 50 °F (10 °C), Overcast
- Television network: ABC (regional)

Scoring summary
2	WASH	Nelson 39-yard field goal	WASH 3-0
2	WSU	Martin 6-yard run (Leland kick)	WSU 7-3
2	WASH	Skansi 15-yard pass from Pelluer (Nelson kick)	WASH 10-7
3	WSU	Leland 27-yard field goal	Tied 10-10
3	WASH	Jackson 23-yard run (Nelson kick)	WASH 17-10
3	WASH	Nelson 28-yard field goal	WASH 20-10
4	WASH	Nelson 34-yard field goal	WASH 23-10

The Cougars entered the Apple Cup with an 8–1–1 record and a road win over Washington at Husky Stadium would clinch the Pac-10 title and a Rose Bowl berth, WSU's first bowl game in 51 years. The Huskies prevailed at home, 23–10, for their eighth straight win over the Cougs, who were invited to the Holiday Bowl.

Conference leader UCLA lost by a point to rival USC, which gave Washington the Pac-10 title and Rose Bowl berth; the top five teams in the Pac-10 had two losses each in league play.

=== Vs. Iowa (Rose Bowl) ===
#12 Washington vs. #13 Iowa

Team	1	2	3	4	Total
• Huskies	0	13	0	15	28
Hawkeyes	0	0	0	0	0

- Date: January 1, 1982
- Location: Rose Bowl, Pasadena, California
- Game attendance: 105,611
- Referee: Rich McVay
- TV announcers (NBC): Dick Enberg, Merlin Olsen

Scoring summary
2	UW	Robinson 1-yard run (Nelson kick)	UW 7-0
2	UW	Coby 1-yard run (pass failed)	UW 13-0
4	UW	Robinson 34-yard run (Pelluer pass to Skansi)	UW 21-0
4	UW	Cowan 3-yard run (Nelson kick)	UW 28-0

== Roster ==
1981 Washington Huskies football team roster
Players
Coaches
Offense

Pos.	#	Name	Class
WR	15	Anthony Allen	Jr
G	62	Andy Bresolin	Sr
TB	4	Dennis Brown	Jr
G	57	James Carter (C)	Sr
RB	5	Vince Coby (C)	Sr
C	50	Paul Coty	Jr
QB	14	Tim Cowan	Jr
OT	77	Don Dow	Jr
MG	92	Scott Garnett	So
WR	80	Danny Greene	Fr
TB	22	Sterling Hinds	So
TB	25	Ron Jackson	So
FB	31	Chris James	Jr
TE	56	Rick Mallory	So
OT	72	Eric Moran	Jr
QB	16	Steve Pelluer	So
TB	28	Jacque Robinson	Fr
TE	32	Willie Rosborough	Jr
WR	7	Paul Skansi	Jr

Defense

Pos.	#	Name	Class
LB	48	Tony Caldwell	Jr
DT	61	Ray Cattage	Jr
LB	40	Ken Driscoll	Jr
CB	8	Ray Horton	Sr
DT	65	Fletcher Jenkins (C)	Sr
LB	67	Mark Jerue (C)	Sr
FS	24	Robert Leaphart	So
MG	68	Lynn Madsen	So
DB	23	Vince Newsome	Jr
SS	30	Chris O'Connor	Jr
CB	11	Bill Stapleton	Jr
LB	38	Mark Stewart	Jr

Special teams

Pos.	#	Name	Class
K	13	Chuck Nelson	Jr
P	18	Jeff Partridge	Jr

Head coach

- Don James (7th year)

Coordinators/assistant coaches

- Bob Stull – OC
- Jim Lambright – DC

Legend

- (C) Team captain
- (S) Suspended
- (I) Ineligible
- Injured
- Redshirt

== NFL draft selections ==
Two University of Washington Huskies were selected in the 1982 NFL draft which lasted twelve rounds with 334 selections.

= Husky Hall of Fame

Player	Position	Round	Overall	Franchise
Mark Jerue	LB	5	135	New York Jets
Fletcher Jenkins	DT	7	169	Baltimore Colts
