= 1981 Arizona Wildcats football team =

American college football season

1981 Arizona Wildcats football
- Conference: Pacific-10 Conference
- Record: 6–5 (4–4 Pac-10)
- Head coach: Larry Smith (2nd season)
- Offensive coordinator: Steve Axman (2nd season)
- Defensive coordinator: Moe Ankney (2nd season)
- Home stadium: Arizona Stadium

1981 Pacific-10 Conference football standings
	Conf.					Overall
Team	W		L		T	W		L		T
No. 10 Washington $	6	–	2	–	0	10	–	2	–	0
No. 16 Arizona State	5	–	2	–	0	9	–	2	–	0
No. 14 USC	5	–	2	–	0	9	–	3	–	0
Washington State	5	–	2	–	1	8	–	3	–	1
UCLA	5	–	2	–	1	7	–	4	–	1
Arizona	4	–	4	–	0	6	–	5	–	0
Stanford	4	–	4	–	0	4	–	7	–	0
California	2	–	6	–	0	2	–	9	–	0
Oregon	1	–	6	–	0	2	–	9	–	0
Oregon State	0	–	7	–	0	1	–	10	–	0
$ – Conference champion; Rankings from AP Poll

The 1981 Arizona Wildcats football team represented the University of Arizona in the Pacific-10 Conference (Pac-10) during the 1981 NCAA Division I-A football season. In their second season under head coach Larry Smith, the Wildcats compiled a 6–5 record (4–4 against Pac-10 opponents), finished in a tie for sixth place in the Pac-10, and outscored their opponents, 253 to 205. The team played its home games in Arizona Stadium in Tucson, Arizona.

A memorable highlight of the season occurred in October when Arizona upset #1 USC, which was Arizona's first win over a top-ranked opponent in school history. It was also the Wildcats’ first win over the Trojans in program history. Losses to Fresno State and rival Arizona State in the final two games of the regular season were factors that prevented the Wildcats from going to a bowl game, although Arizona finished with a winning record (at the time, a 6–5 record did not always guarantee a bowl appearance due to very few bowls).

The team's statistical leaders included Tom Tunnicliffe with 1,420 passing yards, Vance Johnson with 654 rushing yards, and Bob Carter with 427 receiving yards. Linebacker Ricky Hunley led the team with 121 total tackles.

== Before the season ==
Arizona finished the 1980 season (Smith’s first year with the Wildcats) with a 5–6 record, and featured the Wildcats’ upset victory over UCLA. The team entered 1981 with expectations that they would improve on their record, with fans believing that Smith was building a success with the program.

== Schedule ==
Date	Time	Opponent	Site	TV	Result	Attendance	Source
September 12	5:00 p.m.	No. 12 UCLA	Arizona Stadium; Tucson, AZ	CBS	L 18–35	49,311	
September 19	7:00 p.m.	California	Arizona Stadium; Tucson, AZ	KZAZ	L 13–14	40,096	
September 26	7:00 p.m.	Cal State Fullerton*	Arizona Stadium; Tucson, AZ	KZAZ	W 37–16	36,279	
October 3	7:00 p.m.	Stanford	Arizona Stadium; Tucson, AZ	USA	W 17–13	41,110	
October 10	12:30 p.m.	at No. 1 USC	Los Angeles Memorial Coliseum; Los Angeles, CA	ABC	W 13–10	56,315	
October 17	1:00 p.m.	at Oregon	Autzen Stadium; Eugene, OR		W 18–14	24,264	
October 24	7:30 p.m.	No. 16 Washington State^{†}	Arizona Stadium; Tucson, AZ	ESPN	L 19–34	50,265	
October 31	7:00 p.m.	UTEP*	Arizona Stadium; Tucson, AZ	KZAZ	W 48–15	35,642	
November 14	8:30 p.m.	at Oregon State	Parker Stadium; Corvallis, OR		W 40–7	18,339	
November 21	1:00 p.m.	Fresno State*	Arizona Stadium; Tucson, AZ	KZAZ	L 17–23	38,107	
November 28	7:30 p.m.	at No. 18 Arizona State	Sun Devil Stadium; Tempe, AZ (rivalry)	USA	L 13–24	72,445	
*Non-conference game; ^{†}Homecoming; Rankings from AP Poll released prior to the game; All times are in Mountain time

== Game summaries ==
=== UCLA ===
In the home, conference, and season opener, the Wildcats hosted UCLA. Arizona upset the Bruins in the previous year that prevented UCLA from earning the top ranking. This time, UCLA (who was ranked 12th) got vengeance, and defeated the Wildcats to avenge the loss, which meant that the Wildcats would not earn home upset victories over the Bruins in consecutive seasons.

=== USC ===
Arizona visited top-ranked USC in the Wildcats’ first road game of the season. After the Trojans took an early 10–0 lead, the Wildcats scored 13 unanswered points to shock the college football world for a huge upset victory. It was Arizona's first win over a top-ranked team in program history and it was their biggest win since joining the Pac-10 in 1978. A few hours after the game ended, the team returned to Tucson and was met by a crowd of raucous fans for wild celebrations at both the Tucson airport and the Arizona campus. It was the second straight year that Smith's Wildcats upset top-5 team, as they defeated UCLA (the other Los Angeles school), who was ranked second at the time, in the previous season.

=== Washington State ===
The Wildcats hosted 16th-ranked Washington State in a late October homecoming matchup, looking for another upset victory of the season. However, Arizona would be outplayed and outcoached by a tough Cougars squad in the first half. In the second half, the Wildcats attempted a comeback. Unfortunately, they would come up short and suffered a defeat that snapped a four-game winning streak after an 0–2 start to the year.

=== Arizona State ===
In the season finale, Arizona traveled to face Arizona State (ranked 18th) in the rivalry game. It was first time since the 1979 Fiesta Bowl that the Wildcats returned to Tempe.

In the previous season, Smith remarked that ASU was the “NFL team in Arizona” after the Sun Devils embarrassed the Wildcats in Tucson. When Arizona entered the field, the Sun Devil Stadium crowd serenaded Smith with chants of “Who’s the NFL team in this state?” and fans held up signs that referenced Smith’s remarks.

In the game itself, Smith’s remarks proved to be true as the Wildcats struggled and lost to ASU yet again on a rainy night, perhaps denying the Wildcats a chance to earn a bowl bid. Also, the loss extended ASU's dominance in the rivalry dating back to 1949, with the Wildcats losing for the 24th time in 33 meetings, leading to Smith referring to Arizona as the “little brother” to ASU during a postgame interview, and calling ASU the “big brother” as they were the better rival team during the time.

== Season notes ==
- Arizona returned to wearing white helmets and blue jerseys at home full-time after previously donning red helmets and jerseys. They began wearing the helmets that featured a large red “A” on them. The team believed that wearing blue would distinguish themselves from several Pac-10 teams that wear red helmets and/or jerseys at home. The Wildcats would continue to wear the “Red ‘A’” helmets until the end of the 1989 season and began wearing helmets with the school’s current “Block ‘A’” logo on it in 1990.
- This was the first season that Arizona Stadium’s end zones were painted with wordmarks. One end zone featured “Arizona” in red letters and the other had “Wildcats” in blue. The end zones had been blank since the stadium opened in 1929.
- The Wildcats played its first four games of the season due to Pac-10 scheduling. Arizona would not begin another season with four consecutive home games until 2004, though the following season began with three straight games at home before Arizona hit the road.
- The win over USC was Smith’s first and only one as Arizona’s coach and the only victory over the Trojans in the 1980s, as the Wildcats would defeat USC again until 1990, in which, ironically, Smith was the USC coach (he left the Wildcats for the Trojans before the 1987 season). The victory would be voted as the Wildcats’ top football win of the decade.
- After this season, the Wildcats would not defeat a top-ranked opponent until 1992 when they would upset Washington.
- This season was the last in which Smith lost to Arizona State. The Wildcats would not lose to the Sun Devils again until 1991 (despite tying the 1987 contest), and started a reign of dominance over their rival that began the following season.
- The Wildcats’ loss to Arizona State was the only loss for Arizona on the road, and prevented a perfect road record, as Arizona's other four losses occurred at home. Interestingly enough, in 1975, a loss to ASU also denied the Wildcats an unbeaten record on the road during that season. Arizona would not finish a season with an undefeated road record until 1998.
- As Smith referred to ASU as Arizona’s “big brother” after the Wildcats’ season-ending loss which continued ASU’s dominance in the rivalry, ASU fans began to troll him after the season (as well as into 1982) as a result (with the “big brother” remarks likely a reference to the novel Nineteen Eighty-Four, or 1984, which featured a character named “Big Brother”). It would not be until 1986 that Smith remarked that the Wildcats were the “big brother” team, as they would begin to become dominant, though in the 1984 season that the remarks would live up to its name when Arizona went on to defeat ASU that year.

== After the season ==
Although their record wasn’t good enough for a bowl game appearance (perhaps due to the loss to ASU), the Wildcats continued to rebuild during the offseason, with Smith promising to never lose to ASU again as long as he remained Arizona’s coach, which turned out to be true. Arizona would also continue its resurgence by bringing in recruiting classes that would help the program restore its formula of winning once more. It would ultimately lead to a memorable 1982 season in which the Wildcats would compete and win out against elite opponents.

== Personnel ==
1981 Arizona Wildcats football team roster
Players
Coaches
Offense

Pos.	#	Name	Class
WR	81	Brad Anderson	So
G	60	Frank Kail	Sr
QB		Tom Tunnicliffe	So

Defense

Pos.	#	Name	Class
CB	3	Danny Copeland	Jr
LB	89	Ricky Hunley	So

Special teams

Pos.	#	Name	Class

Head coach

- Larry Smith

Coordinators/assistant coaches

Legend

- (C) Team captain
- (S) Suspended
- (I) Ineligible
- Injured
- Redshirt
