= 1981 Oregon Ducks football team =

American college football season

1981 Oregon Ducks football
- Conference: Pacific-10 Conference
- Record: 2–9 (1–6 Pac-10)
- Head coach: Rich Brooks (5th season)
- Offensive coordinator: Erik Widmark (2nd season)
- Captain: Game captains
- Home stadium: Autzen Stadium

1981 Pacific-10 Conference football standings
	Conf.					Overall
Team	W		L		T	W		L		T
No. 10 Washington $	6	–	2	–	0	10	–	2	–	0
No. 16 Arizona State	5	–	2	–	0	9	–	2	–	0
No. 14 USC	5	–	2	–	0	9	–	3	–	0
Washington State	5	–	2	–	1	8	–	3	–	1
UCLA	5	–	2	–	1	7	–	4	–	1
Arizona	4	–	4	–	0	6	–	5	–	0
Stanford	4	–	4	–	0	4	–	7	–	0
California	2	–	6	–	0	2	–	9	–	0
Oregon	1	–	6	–	0	2	–	9	–	0
Oregon State	0	–	7	–	0	1	–	10	–	0
$ – Conference champion; Rankings from AP Poll

The 1981 Oregon Ducks football team represented the University of Oregon in the 1981 NCAA Division I-A football season. Playing as a member of the Pacific-10 Conference (Pac-10), the team was led by head coach Rich Brooks, in his fifth year, and played their home games at Autzen Stadium in Eugene, Oregon. They finished the season with a record of two wins and nine losses (2–9 overall, 1–6 in the Pac-10, ninth).

== Schedule ==
Date	Time	Opponent	Site	Result	Attendance	Source
September 5	7:00 pm	at Fresno State*	Bulldog Stadium; Fresno, CA	L 16–23	28,637	
September 12	11:30 am	at No. 16 Kansas*	Memorial Stadium; Lawrence, KS	L 10–19	33,840	
September 19	1:00 pm	Pacific (CA)*	Autzen Stadium; Eugene, OR	W 34–0	24,519	
September 26	1:00 pm	No. 16 Washington	Autzen Stadium; Eugene, OR (rivalry)	L 3–17	40,695	
October 10	7:30 pm	at Arizona State	Sun Devil Stadium; Tempe, AZ	L 0–24	63,935	
October 17	1:00 pm	Arizona	Autzen Stadium; Eugene, OR	L 14–18	24,264	
October 24	1:00 pm	Air Force*	Autzen Stadium; Eugene, OR	L 10–20	23,290	
October 31	1:00 pm	UCLA	Autzen Stadium; Eugene, OR	L 11–28	24,272	
November 7	1:00 pm	at Washington State	Martin Stadium; Pullman, WA	L 7–39	33,500	
November 14	1:00 pm	at Stanford	Stanford Stadium; Stanford, CA (rivalry)	L 3–42	36,106	
November 21	1:00 pm	Oregon State	Autzen Stadium; Eugene, OR (Civil War)	W 47–17	31,142	
*Non-conference game; Rankings from AP Poll released prior to the game; All times are in Pacific time

== Game summaries ==
=== Oregon State ===
Team	1	2	3	4	Total
Oregon St	0	10	7	0	17
• Oregon	14	7	20	6	47

- Date: November 21
- Location: Autzen Stadium

Scoring summary
Q1	12:18	ORE	Williams 2 yard run (Jollymour kick)	ORE 7–0
Q1	2:11	ORE	Williams 1 yard run (Jollymour kick)	ORE 14–0
Q2	12:18	ORE	Billups 1 yard run (Jollymour kick)	ORE 21–0
Q2	8:19	OSU	Simmons 12 yard pass from Singler (Mangold kick)	ORE 21–7
Q2	0:53	OSU	Mangold 47 yard field goal	ORE 21–10
Q3	10:52	ORE	Billups 21 yard run (Jollymour kick)	ORE 28–10
Q3	7:02	OSU	Singler 1 yard run (Mangold kick)	ORE 28–17
Q3	5:50	ORE	Jollymour 28 yard field goal	ORE 31–17
Q3	0:31	ORE	Jollymour 49 yard field goal	ORE 34–17
Q3	0:14	ORE	Brosterhaus 8 yard pass from Lusk (Jollymour kick)	ORE 41–17
Q4	10:37	ORE	Lusk 1 yard run (kick failed)	ORE 47–17

== Roster ==
- Gary Beck (offense), RS Sr
- TB Harry Billups
- Jon Brosterhous (offense), RS Sr
- TB Reggie Brown
- P Ken Burns
- Michael Cray #75 (defense)
- Donald Davis, RS Sr
- Mike Delegato, RS Sr
- S Joe Figures (defense)
- CB Ross Gibbs
- ILB #47 Ed Hagerty, Sr
- TE Greg Hogensen, RS Sr
- Mike Johnson, Fr.
- LS Steve Johnson
- PK Doug Jollymour
- QB Kevin Lusk
- Bob McCray (asst coach)
- Greg Moser, Jr
- Rick Price (offense), RS Sr
- TE Tim Tyler
- LB Andy Vobora, Sr
- DE Mike Walter
- FB Vince Williams, RS Sr
- Stu Yatsko (offense), RS Sr

== NFL draft ==
Three Ducks were selected in the 1982 NFL draft, which lasted 12 rounds (334 selections).

Player	Position	Round	Pick	Franchise
Reggie Brown	Running back	4	95	Atlanta Falcons
Vince Williams	Running back	6	151	San Francisco 49ers
Stuart Yatsko	Guard	11	300	Denver Broncos
