= 1981 USC Trojans football team =

American college football season

1981 USC Trojans football

Fiesta Bowl, L 10–26 vs. Penn State
- Conference: Pacific-10 Conference

Ranking
- Coaches: No. 13
- AP: No. 14
- Record: 9–3 (5–2 Pac-10)
- Head coach: John Robinson (6th season)
- Defensive coordinator: R. C. Slocum (1st season)
- Captains: Marcus Allen; Chip Banks
- Home stadium: Los Angeles Memorial Coliseum

1981 Pacific-10 Conference football standings
	Conf.					Overall
Team	W		L		T	W		L		T
No. 10 Washington $	6	–	2	–	0	10	–	2	–	0
No. 16 Arizona State	5	–	2	–	0	9	–	2	–	0
No. 14 USC	5	–	2	–	0	9	–	3	–	0
Washington State	5	–	2	–	1	8	–	3	–	1
UCLA	5	–	2	–	1	7	–	4	–	1
Arizona	4	–	4	–	0	6	–	5	–	0
Stanford	4	–	4	–	0	4	–	7	–	0
California	2	–	6	–	0	2	–	9	–	0
Oregon	1	–	6	–	0	2	–	9	–	0
Oregon State	0	–	7	–	0	1	–	10	–	0
$ – Conference champion; Rankings from AP Poll

The 1981 USC Trojans football team represented the University of Southern California (USC) in the 1981 NCAA Division I-A football season. In their sixth year under head coach John Robinson, the Trojans compiled a 9–3 record (5–2 against conference opponents), finished in a tie for second place in the Pacific-10 Conference (Pac-10), and outscored their opponents by a combined total of 284 to 170.

Quarterback John Mazur led the team in passing, completing 93 of 194 passes for 1,128 yards with seven touchdowns and five interceptions. Marcus Allen led the team in rushing with 433 carries for 2,427 yards and 22 touchdowns. Jeff Simmons led the team in receiving yards with 28 catches for 543 yards and one touchdown. Allen became the first player in NCAA history to rush for over 2,000 yards in one season. He also gained a total of 2,683 offensive yards, led the nation in scoring, and won the Heisman Trophy, the Maxwell Award, and Walter Camp Award and was also the Pac-10 player of the year.

== Schedule ==
Date	Opponent	Rank	Site	TV	Result	Attendance	Source
September 12	Tennessee*	No. 5	Los Angeles Memorial Coliseum; Los Angeles, CA	USA	W 43–7	62,147	
September 19	at Indiana*	No. 2	Memorial Stadium; Bloomington, IN	ONTV	W 21–0	51,167	
September 26	No. 2 Oklahoma*	No. 1	Los Angeles Memorial Coliseum; Los Angeles, CA	ABC	W 28–24	85,651	
October 3	at Oregon State	No. 1	Parker Stadium; Corvallis, OR		W 56–22	33,000	
October 10	Arizona	No. 1	Los Angeles Memorial Coliseum; Los Angeles, CA		L 10–13	56,315	
October 17	Stanford^{†}	No. 7	Los Angeles Memorial Coliseum; Los Angeles, CA (rivalry)		W 25–17	76,291	
October 24	at Notre Dame*	No. 5	Notre Dame Stadium; Notre Dame, IN (rivalry)		W 14–7	59,075	
October 31	No. 14 Washington State	No. 4	Los Angeles Memorial Coliseum; Los Angeles, CA		W 41–17	60,972	
November 7	at California	No. 3	California Memorial Stadium; Berkeley, CA		W 21–3	74,000	
November 14	at Washington	No. 3	Husky Stadium; Seattle, WA		L 3–13	47,347	
November 21	No. 15 UCLA	No. 10	Los Angeles Memorial Coliseum; Los Angeles, CA (Victory Bell)	ABC	W 22–21	89,432	
January 1, 1982	vs. No. 7 Penn State*	No. 8	Sun Devil Stadium; Tempe, AZ (Fiesta Bowl)	NBC	L 10–26	71,053	
*Non-conference game; ^{†}Homecoming; Rankings from AP Poll released prior to the game

== Roster ==
1981 USC Trojans football team roster
Players
Coaches
Offense

Pos.	#	Name	Class
RB	33	Marcus Allen	Sr
WR		Brad Anderson
TE		Mark Boyer
TE		Fred Cornwell
RB		Fred Crutcher
G	64	Roy Foster	Sr
RB		Anthony Gibson
RB		John Kamana
RB		Zephrini Lee
C	66	Bruce Matthews	Jr
QB	11	John Mazur	So
RB		Bob McClanahan
WR	22	Malcolm Moore	So
OT	72	Don Mosebar	Jr
QB	7	Sean Salisbury	Fr
WR	29	Jeff Simmons	Jr
OL		Tony Slaton	So
RB		Todd Spencer
OL	93	Kelly Thomas	Jr
QB	15	Scott Tinsley	Jr
WR		Timmie Ware
WR		Timmy White

Defense

Pos.	#	Name	Class
MG		George Achica
LB	51	Chip Banks	Sr
LB		Jeff Brown
S	47	Joey Browner	Jr
DL		Keith Browner
LB	87	August Curley	Jr
DT	94	Byron Darby	Jr
LB	52	Jack Del Rio	Fr
DL		Dennis Edwards
DL		John Harvey
LB		Neil Hope
LB		Tim Sullivan
DB		Joe Turner
DL		Charles Ussery
DB		Troy West
DB		Marv Williams

Special teams

Pos.	#	Name	Class
K	5	Steve Jordan	Fr
K		Scott Livingston
P		Dave Pryor

Head coach

- John Robinson

Coordinators/assistant coaches

Legend

- (C) Team captain
- (S) Suspended
- (I) Ineligible
- Injured
- Redshirt

== Awards and honors ==
- Marcus Allen, Heisman Trophy
- Marcus Allen, Maxwell Award
- Marcus Allen, Walter Camp Award
- Marcus Allen, Pac-10 Player of the Year
- Marcus Allen, All-Pac-10

== 1981 team players in the NFL ==
- Marcus Allen
- Chip Banks
- Joey Browner
- Keith Browner
- Fred Cornwell
- August Curley
- Byron Darby
- Jack Del Rio
- Dennis Edwards
- Riki Ellison
- John Harvey
- Michael Marper
- Bruce Matthews
- Don Mosebar
- Jeff Simmons
- Tony Slaton
- Kelly Thomas
- Joe Turner
- Troy West
