= 1981 Oregon State Beavers football team =

American college football season

1981 Oregon State Beavers football
- Conference: Pacific-10 Conference
- Record: 1–10 (0–7 Pac-10)
- Head coach: Joe Avezzano (2nd season)
- Home stadium: Parker Stadium

1981 Pacific-10 Conference football standings
	Conf.					Overall
Team	W		L		T	W		L		T
No. 10 Washington $	6	–	2	–	0	10	–	2	–	0
No. 16 Arizona State	5	–	2	–	0	9	–	2	–	0
No. 14 USC	5	–	2	–	0	9	–	3	–	0
Washington State	5	–	2	–	1	8	–	3	–	1
UCLA	5	–	2	–	1	7	–	4	–	1
Arizona	4	–	4	–	0	6	–	5	–	0
Stanford	4	–	4	–	0	4	–	7	–	0
California	2	–	6	–	0	2	–	9	–	0
Oregon	1	–	6	–	0	2	–	9	–	0
Oregon State	0	–	7	–	0	1	–	10	–	0
$ – Conference champion; Rankings from AP Poll

The 1981 Oregon State Beavers football team represented Oregon State University as a remember of Pacific-10 Conference (Pac-10) during the 1981 NCAA Division I-A football season. In their second season under head coach Joe Avezzano, the Beavers compiled an overall record of 1–10 record with a mark of 0–7 in conference playing, placing last in the Pac-10, and were outscored by their opponents, 469 to 145. The team played its home games at Parker Stadium in Corvallis, Oregon.

== Schedule ==
Date	Opponent	Site	Result	Attendance	Source
September 12	Fresno State*	Parker Stadium; Corvallis, OR	W 31–28	28,000	
September 19	at LSU*	Tiger Stadium; Baton Rouge, LA	L 24–27	74,962	
September 26	at Minnesota*	Memorial Stadium; Minneapolis, MN	L 12–42	30,890	
October 3	No. 1 USC	Parker Stadium; Corvallis, OR	L 22–56	33,000	
October 10	Washington State	Parker Stadium; Corvallis, OR	L 0–23	32,500	
October 17	at Washington	Husky Stadium; Seattle, WA	L 17–56	52,324	
October 24	at Oklahoma*	Oklahoma Memorial Stadium; Norman, OK	L 3–42	75,658	
October 31	at California	California Memorial Stadium; Berkeley, CA	L 3–45	25,000	
November 7	Stanford	Parker Stadium; Corvallis, OR	L 9–63	22,000	
November 14	Arizona	Parker Stadium; Corvallis, OR	L 7–40	18,339	
November 21	at Oregon	Autzen Stadium; Eugene, OR (Civil War)	L 17–47	31,142	
*Non-conference game; Rankings from AP Poll released prior to the game

== Game summaries ==
=== Fresno State ===
- Victor Simmons 6 Rec, 155 Yds, TD

== Roster ==
- DT Tracy Abernathy
- LB Jerome Boyd, Jr.
- OT Joe Carnahan
- WR Armand Chong
- OG Pete Grossnicklaus #69
- OG Jim Wilson #59
- LB J.J. Gracio
- Terry Harris
- DT Tyrone Howard #73
- WR Ken Lawson, Fr.
- C Roger Levasa, Sr.
- PK Chris Mangold
- DE Craig Sowash #17 (defense)
- WR Victor Simmons, Sr.
- QB Ed Singler
- CB Kenny Taylor #30
