= Kani Kauahi =

American football player and coach (born 1959)

Arizona Rattlers
- Title: Assistant head coach

Personal information
- Born: September 6, 1959 (age 67); Kekaha, Hawaii, U.S.
- Listed height: 6 ft 2 in (1.88 m)
- Listed weight: 260 lb (118 kg)

Career information
- High school: Kamehameha Schools (Honolulu, Hawaii)
- College: Hawaii
- NFL draft: 1982: undrafted

Career history

Playing
- Seattle Seahawks (1982–1986); Green Bay Packers (1988); Phoenix Cardinals (1989–1991); Kansas City Chiefs (1992); Phoenix Cardinals (1993); Saskatchewan Roughriders (1994)

Coaching
- Mesa (AZ) (OL, 1995); Arizona Cardinals (S&C, 1996–1997); BC Lions (OL, 1998–2000); San Francisco Rage (2001); Ottawa Renegades (Asst. HC/OC, 2002–2005); Hamilton Tiger-Cats (2006); Arizona Rattlers (OL/Asst. HC, 2007–present)

Awards and highlights
- 3× ArenaBowl champion (2012, 2013, 2014); United Bowl champion (2017)

Career NFL statistics
- Games played: 140
- Games started: 7
- Fumble recoveries: 2
- Stats at Pro Football Reference

Daniel Kani Kauahi (born September 6, 1959) is an American professional football coach and former player who is the assistant head coach for the Arizona Rattlers in the Indoor Football League (AFL). He played professionally as a center in the National Football League (NFL). He joined the Rattlers in 2007 as the defensive line coach.

== Playing career ==
Kauahi grew up on the Hawaiian island of Kaua'i, and played college football with the Arizona State Sun Devils and the Hawaii Warriors. He then played center for 12 seasons in Pro Football, with the Seattle Seahawks, the Green Bay Packers, the Phoenix Cardinals, the Kansas City Chiefs and Saskatchewan Roughriders.

== Coaching career ==
Kauahi has coached at the college level (Mesa Community College), and at the professional level in the NFL (Arizona Cardinals), the CFL (BC Lions, Ottawa Renegades, and the Hamilton Tiger-Cats), and in the XFL San Francisco Rage.

Kani also was the offensive line coach one season for his son's high school football team, Desert Vista High School, in Phoenix, Arizona.

Most recently Kauahi has been coaching at the University of Waterloo in Waterloo, Ontario as the Offensive Line Coach. Also, coaching with the Arizona Rattlers.
