= 1981 California Golden Bears football team =

American college football season

1981 California Golden Bears football
- Conference: Pacific-10 Conference
- Record: 2–9 (2–6 Pac-10)
- Head coach: Roger Theder (4th season)
- Offensive coordinator: Mouse Davis (1st season)
- Offensive scheme: Run and shoot
- Home stadium: California Memorial Stadium

1981 Pacific-10 Conference football standings
	Conf.					Overall
Team	W		L		T	W		L		T
No. 10 Washington $	6	–	2	–	0	10	–	2	–	0
No. 16 Arizona State	5	–	2	–	0	9	–	2	–	0
No. 14 USC	5	–	2	–	0	9	–	3	–	0
Washington State	5	–	2	–	1	8	–	3	–	1
UCLA	5	–	2	–	1	7	–	4	–	1
Arizona	4	–	4	–	0	6	–	5	–	0
Stanford	4	–	4	–	0	4	–	7	–	0
California	2	–	6	–	0	2	–	9	–	0
Oregon	1	–	6	–	0	2	–	9	–	0
Oregon State	0	–	7	–	0	1	–	10	–	0
$ – Conference champion; Rankings from AP Poll

The 1981 California Golden Bears football team was an American football team that represented the University of California, Berkeley during the 1981 NCAA Division I-A football season. Under head coach Roger Theder, the team compiled an overall record of 2–9 and 2–6 in conference.

== Schedule ==
Date	Opponent	Site	Result	Attendance	Source
September 5	Texas A&M*	California Memorial Stadium; Berkeley, CA	L 28–29	33,751	
September 12	at No. 6 Georgia*	Sanford Stadium; Athens, GA	L 13–27	79,400	
September 19	at Arizona	Arizona Stadium; Tucson, AZ	W 14–13	40,096	
September 26	San Jose State*	California Memorial Stadium; Berkeley, CA	L 24–27	34,000	
October 10	Washington	California Memorial Stadium; Berkeley, CA	L 26–27	33,600	
October 17	at No. 17 Arizona State	Sun Devil Stadium; Tempe, AZ	L 17–45	63,110	
October 24	at UCLA	Los Angeles Memorial Coliseum; Los Angeles, CA (rivalry)	L 6–34	41,637	
October 31	Oregon State	California Memorial Stadium; Berkeley, CA	W 45–3	25,000	
November 7	No. 3 USC	California Memorial Stadium; Berkeley, CA	L 3–21	74,000	
November 14	at No. 17 Washington State	Joe Albi Stadium; Spokane, WA	L 0–19	31,000	
November 21	at Stanford	Stanford Stadium; Stanford, CA (Big Game)	L 21–42	84,536	
*Non-conference game; Rankings from AP Poll released prior to the game
