= 1981 UCLA Bruins football team =

American college football season

1981 UCLA Bruins football

Astro-Bluebonnet Bowl, L 14–33 vs. Michigan
- Conference: Pacific-10 Conference
- Record: 7–4–1 (5–2–1 Pac-10)
- Head coach: Terry Donahue (6th season)
- Offensive coordinator: Homer Smith (4th season)
- Defensive coordinator: Jed Hughes (5th season)
- Home stadium: Los Angeles Memorial Coliseum

1981 Pacific-10 Conference football standings
	Conf.					Overall
Team	W		L		T	W		L		T
No. 10 Washington $	6	–	2	–	0	10	–	2	–	0
No. 16 Arizona State	5	–	2	–	0	9	–	2	–	0
No. 14 USC	5	–	2	–	0	9	–	3	–	0
Washington State	5	–	2	–	1	8	–	3	–	1
UCLA	5	–	2	–	1	7	–	4	–	1
Arizona	4	–	4	–	0	6	–	5	–	0
Stanford	4	–	4	–	0	4	–	7	–	0
California	2	–	6	–	0	2	–	9	–	0
Oregon	1	–	6	–	0	2	–	9	–	0
Oregon State	0	–	7	–	0	1	–	10	–	0
$ – Conference champion; Rankings from AP Poll

The 1981 UCLA Bruins football team was an American football team that represented the University of California, Los Angeles during the 1981 NCAA Division I-A football season. In their sixth year under head coach Terry Donahue, the Bruins compiled a 7–4–1 record (5–2–1 Pac-10), finished in a tie for fourth place in the Pacific-10 Conference, and lost to Michigan in the 1981 Astro-Bluebonnet Bowl.

UCLA's offensive leaders in 1981 were quarterback Tom Ramsey with 1,793 passing yards, running back Kevin Nelson with 883 rushing yards, and wide receiver Cormac Carney with 539 receiving yards.

This was the Bruins' final season at the Los Angeles Memorial Coliseum, their home field since 1928, sharing with the USC Trojans. UCLA moved to the Rose Bowl in Pasadena for the 1982 season.

== Schedule ==
Date	Opponent	Rank	Site	TV	Result	Attendance	Source
September 12	at Arizona	No. 12	Arizona Stadium; Tucson, AZ		W 35–18	49,311	
September 19	at No. 20 Wisconsin*	No. 9	Camp Randall Stadium; Madison, WI		W 31–13	69,212	
September 26	at Iowa*	No. 6	Kinnick Stadium; Iowa City, IA	KTLA	L 7–20	60,004	
October 3	Colorado*	No. 16	Los Angeles Memorial Coliseum; Los Angeles, CA		W 27–7	40,347	
October 10	at Stanford	No. 17	Stanford Stadium; Stanford, CA (rivalry)		L 23–26	70,103	
October 17	at No. 18 Washington State		Martin Stadium; Pullman, WA	ABC	T 17–17	40,000	
October 24	California		Los Angeles Memorial Coliseum; Los Angeles, CA (rivalry)		W 34–6	41,637	
October 31	at Oregon		Autzen Stadium; Eugene, OR		W 28–11	24,272	
November 7	No. 16 Washington		Los Angeles Memorial Coliseum; Los Angeles, CA		W 31–0	41,818	
November 14	No. 9 Arizona State	No. 18	Los Angeles Memorial Coliseum; Los Angeles, CA		W 34–24	47,361	
November 21	at No. 10 USC	No. 15	Los Angeles Memorial Coliseum; Los Angeles, CA (Victory Bell)	ABC	L 21–22	89,432	
December 31	vs. No. 16 Michigan*	No. 19	Houston Astrodome; Houston, TX (Astro-Bluebonnet Bowl)		L 14–33	50,107	
*Non-conference game; Rankings from AP Poll released prior to the game

== Personnel ==
1981 UCLA Bruins football team roster
Players
Coaches
Offense

Pos.	#	Name	Class
RB	24	Danny Andrews	Fr
QB	12	Steve Bono	So
RB	42	Frank Bruno	Jr
WR	83	Cormac Carney	Jr
RB	46	Frank Cephous	So
WR	36	Ricky Coffman	Sr
WR	18	Willie Curran	Sr
G	59	Dan Dufour	Jr
TE	90	James Forge	Sr
TE		Harper Howell
OT	67	Duval Love	Fr
OL	62	Dan Mahistedt	So
RB		Terry Morehead
RB	3	Kevin Nelson	So
QB	10	Rick Neuheisel	So
QB	9	David Norrie	Fr
C	51	Dave Otey	Sr
QB	14	Tom Ramsey	Jr
RB		Toa Saipale
RB	37	Burness Scott	So
OT	67	Luis Sharpe	Sr
WR	26	Jo-Jo Townsell	Jr
RB	22	Bryan Wiley	Fr
WR	30	Dokie Williams	Jr
OL	60	Steve Williams	So
G	68	Blake Wingle	Jr
TE	91	Tim Wrightman	Sr
OL	66	Chris Yelch	So
WR	82	Mike Young	Fr

Defense

Pos.	#	Name	Class
LB	86	Ron Butler	So
LB	39	Neal Dellocono	Fr
DT	53	Joe Gary	Sr
LB	92	Ike Gordon	Sr
DB	2	Walter Lang	Jr
LB	27	Blanchard Montgomery	Jr
DT	40	Karl Morgan	Jr
DL	55	Martin Moss	Sr
LB		Gene Newborn
LB	99	Brad Plemmons	Sr
S	7	Don Rogers	So
DB	21	Lupe Sanchez	Jr
SS	32	Tom Sullivan	Jr
DB	35	Jimmy Turner	Jr
LB	41	Doug West	So
LB	87	Glenn Windom	Sr

Special teams

Pos.	#	Name	Class
P	17	Kevin Buenafe	So
K	8	Norm Johnson	Sr

Head coach

- Terry Donahue

Coordinators/assistant coaches

Legend

- (C) Team captain
- (S) Suspended
- (I) Ineligible
- Injured
- Redshirt

== 1982 NFL draft ==
The following players were drafted into professional football following the season.

Player	Position	Round	Pick	Franchise
Luis Sharpe	Tackle	1	16	St. Louis Cardinals
Tim Wrightman	Tight end	3	62	Chicago Bears
