= Mark Jerue =

American football player (born 1960)

No. 59
- Position: Linebacker

Personal information
- Born: January 15, 1960 (age 66); Seattle, Washington, U.S.
- Listed height: 6 ft 3 in (1.91 m)
- Listed weight: 229 lb (104 kg)

Career information
- High school: Mercer Island (WA)
- College: Washington
- NFL draft: 1982: 5th round, 135th overall pick

Career history
- New York Jets (1982)*; Baltimore Colts (1983)*; Los Angeles Rams (1983–1989)
- * Offseason or practice squad member only

Awards and highlights
- First-team All-Pac-10 (1981); Second-team All-Pac-10 (1980); Washington MVP (1981)

Career NFL statistics
- Sacks: 0.5
- Interceptions: 3
- Fumble recoveries: 1
- Stats at Pro Football Reference

Mark Darrell Jerue (born January 15, 1960) is an American former professional football player who was a linebacker for seven seasons with the Los Angeles Rams of the National Football League (NFL)from 1983 to 1989. He played college football for the Washington Huskies.

== See also ==
- Washington Huskies football statistical leaders
