= Joe Gary =

American football player (born 1959)

No. 90
- Position: Defensive end

Personal information
- Born: May 13, 1959 (age 67); Los Angeles, California, U.S.
- Listed height: 6 ft 5 in (1.96 m)
- Listed weight: 273 lb (124 kg)

Career information
- High school: Washington Preparatory (CA)
- College: UCLA
- NFL draft: 1982: 9th round, 249th overall pick

Career history
- Dallas Cowboys (1982)*; Los Angeles Rams (1983)*; Philadelphia Eagles (1984)*; Birmingham Stallions (1984); Baltimore Stars (1985)*
- * Offseason or practice squad member only

Joe Gary III (born May 13, 1959) is an American former football defensive end in the United States Football League (USFL) for the Birmingham Stallions. He played college football at UCLA.

== Early life ==
Gary attended Washington Preparatory High School, where he was a two-way player in football. He won the discus crown in 1976. He won the city shot put title in 1977.

He accepted a football scholarship from UCLA. As a junior, he intercepted a pass against Ohio State University.

In 1977, he was redshirted to gain additional experience. He shared starting duties at defensive tackle in his last three seasons. As a senior, he registered 3 tackles and intercepted a pass in the final minutes, to secure a win against Arizona State University. He finished his college career with 5 sacks and 11 tackles for loss.

== Professional career ==
=== Dallas Cowboys ===
Gary was selected by the Dallas Cowboys in the ninth round (249th overall) of the 1982 NFL draft. He was waived on August 31.

=== Los Angeles Rams ===
On May 12, 1983, he was signed as a free agent by the Los Angeles Rams to play nose tackle. He was cut on August 23.

=== Philadelphia Eagles ===
In 1984, he signed as a free agent with the Philadelphia Eagles to play defensive end. He was released on July 30.

=== Oklahoma Outlaws (USFL) ===
In 1984, he was signed as a free agent by the Oklahoma Outlaws of the United States Football League. On February 20, he was traded to the Birmingham Stallions in exchange for a future draft choice.

=== Birmingham Stallions (USFL) ===
In 1984, he was a backup defensive end and had one sack during the season.

=== Baltimore Stars (USFL) ===
On December 18, 1984, he was signed as a free agent by the Baltimore Stars of the United States Football League, to play defensive end. He was released before the start of the season.
