= Byron Darby =

American football player (born 1960)

No. 94, 72
- Position: Defensive end

Personal information
- Born: June 4, 1960 (age 66); Los Angeles, California, U.S.
- Listed height: 6 ft 4 in (1.93 m)
- Listed weight: 260 lb (118 kg)

Career information
- High school: Inglewood (Inglewood, California)
- College: USC
- NFL draft: 1983: 5th round, 120th overall pick

Career history
- Philadelphia Eagles (1983–1986); Indianapolis Colts (1987–1988); Los Angeles Rams (1989)*; Detroit Lions (1989)
- * Offseason or practice squad member only

Career NFL statistics
- Sacks: 13.5
- Stats at Pro Football Reference

Byron Keith Darby (born June 4, 1960) is an American former professional football player who was a defensive end and tight End in the National Football League (NFL).

He played college football for the USC Trojans. In the 1983 NFL draft, he was selected by the Philadelphia Eagles in the fifth round. Playing for the Eagles for four years, he was released from his contract in 1987.

That year he signed with the Indianapolis Colts as a free agent, and in 1989 signed with Los Angeles Rams.
