= Fletcher Jenkins =

American football player (born 1959)

No. 94, 90
- Positions: Defensive end, defensive tackle

Personal information
- Born: November 4, 1959 (age 67); Tacoma, Washington, U.S.
- Listed height: 6 ft 2 in (1.88 m)
- Listed weight: 258 lb (117 kg)

Career information
- High school: Lakes (Lakewood, Washington)
- College: Washington
- NFL draft: 1982: 7th round, 169th overall pick

Career history
- Baltimore Colts (1982); Los Angeles Express (1984-1985); New Orleans Saints (1986)*
- * Offseason or practice squad member only

Awards and highlights
- Second-team All-American (1981); First-team All-Pac-10 (1981); Second-team All-Pac-10 (1980)

Career NFL statistics
- Fumble recoveries: 1
- Stats at Pro Football Reference

Fletcher Jenkins (born November 4, 1959) is an American former professional football player who was a defensive lineman for one season with the Baltimore Colts in the National Football League (NFL). He played college football for the Washington Huskies with whom he was a team captain.
