= 1981 Stanford Cardinals football team =

American college football season

1981 Stanford Cardinals football
- Conference: Pacific-10 Conference
- Record: 4–7 (4–4 Pac-10)
- Head coach: Paul Wiggin (2nd season)
- Offensive coordinator: Jim Fassel (1st season)
- Offensive scheme: West Coast
- Defensive coordinator: Jack Harbaugh (2nd season)
- Base defense: 4–3
- Home stadium: Stanford Stadium

1981 Pacific-10 Conference football standings
	Conf.					Overall
Team	W		L		T	W		L		T
No. 10 Washington $	6	–	2	–	0	10	–	2	–	0
No. 16 Arizona State	5	–	2	–	0	9	–	2	–	0
No. 14 USC	5	–	2	–	0	9	–	3	–	0
Washington State	5	–	2	–	1	8	–	3	–	1
UCLA	5	–	2	–	1	7	–	4	–	1
Arizona	4	–	4	–	0	6	–	5	–	0
Stanford	4	–	4	–	0	4	–	7	–	0
California	2	–	6	–	0	2	–	9	–	0
Oregon	1	–	6	–	0	2	–	9	–	0
Oregon State	0	–	7	–	0	1	–	10	–	0
$ – Conference champion; Rankings from AP Poll

The 1981 Stanford Cardinals football team represented Stanford University in the Pacific-10 Conference during the 1981 NCAA Division I-A football season. Led by second-year head coach Paul Wiggin, the Cardinal had an overall record of 4–7 (4–4 in Pac-10, tied for sixth), and played home games on campus at Stanford Stadium in Stanford, California. Ranked in the preseason top twenty, Stanford opened with four losses and dropped six of its first seven games to incur their first losing season since 1963.

From 1972 until November 17, 1981, Stanford's official nickname was Cardinals, in reference to one of the school colors, not the bird. After 1981, it became the singular Cardinal.

== Schedule ==
Date	Time	Opponent	Rank	Site	TV	Result	Attendance	Source
September 12	12:20 p.m.	at Purdue*	No. 19	Ross–Ade Stadium; West Lafayette, IN	ABC	L 19–27	62,778	
September 19	1:30 p.m.	San Jose State*		Stanford Stadium; Stanford, CA (rivalry)	USA	L 6–28	67,888	
September 26	1:30 p.m.	No. 8 Ohio State*		Stanford Stadium; Stanford, CA	ESPN	L 19–24	76,102	
October 3	7:00 p.m.	at Arizona		Arizona Stadium; Tucson, AZ	USA	L 13–17	41,110	
October 10	1:30 p.m.	No. 17 UCLA		Stanford Stadium; Stanford, CA (rivalry)	USA	W 26–23	70,103	
October 17	1:30 p.m.	at No. 7 USC		Los Angeles Memorial Coliseum; Los Angeles, CA (rivalry)	USA	L 17–25	76,291	
October 24	1:30 p.m.	No. 17 Arizona State		Stanford Stadium; Stanford, CA	USA	L 36–62	52,855	
October 31	1:30 p.m.	at No. 18 Washington		Husky Stadium; Seattle, WA	USA	L 31–42	55,856	
November 7	1:30 p.m.	at Oregon State		Parker Stadium; Corvallis, OR	USA	W 63–9	22,000	
November 14	1:30 p.m.	Oregon		Stanford Stadium; Stanford, CA (rivalry)	USA	W 42–3	36,106	
November 21	1:30 p.m.	California		Stanford Stadium; Stanford, CA (Big Game)	USA	W 42–21	84,536	
*Non-conference game; Rankings from AP Poll released prior to the game; All times are in Pacific time

== Game summaries ==
=== at Purdue ===
Game One – No. 19 Stanford Cardinals (0–0) vs Purdue Boilermakers (0–0) – Game summary

Quarter	1	2	3	4	Total
No. 19 Cardinals	7	6	6	0	19
Boilermakers	13	7	0	7	27

at Ross–Ade Stadium • West Lafayette, Indiana

- Date: September 12, 1981
- Game time: 12:20 p.m. PDT
- Game attendance: 62,778
- TV announcers (ABC): Keith Jackson (play-by-play), Frank Broyles (analyst) and Steve Davis (sideline)

Game information

First quarter

- STAN – , (Drive: ; Stanford 7–0)
- PUR – , (Drive: ; Stanford 7–6)
- PUR – , (Drive: ; Purdue 13–7)

Second quarter

- STAN – , (Drive: ; Purdue 13–10)
- PUR – , (Drive: ; Purdue 20–10)
- STAN – , (Drive: ; Purdue 20–13)

Third quarter

- STAN – , (Drive: ; Purdue 20–19)

Fourth quarter

- PUR – , (Drive: ; Purdue 27–19)

Statistics	STAN	PUR
First downs		
Total yards		
Rushing yards		
Passing yards		
Passing: Comp–Att–Int		
Time of possession		

Team	Category	Player	Statistics
Stanford	Passing		
Stanford	Rushing		
Stanford	Receiving		
Purdue	Passing		
Purdue	Rushing		
Purdue	Receiving		

=== vs. No. 8 Ohio State ===
Game Three – Ohio State Buckeyes (2–0) vs. Stanford Cardinals (0–2) – Game summary

Quarter	1	2	3	4	Total
No. 8 Buckeyes	0	17	7	0	24
Cardinals	3	3	0	13	19

at Stanford Stadium • Stanford, California

- Date: September 26, 1981
- Game time: 1:30 p.m. PDT
- Game attendance: 76,102
- Referee: Charles Moffett
- TV: ESPN

Game information

First quarter

- STAN – , 1:54 (STAN 3-0)

Second quarter

- OHIO ST – , 11:26 (OHIO ST 7-3)
- STAN – , 7:19 (OHIO ST 7-6)
- OHIO ST – , 4:14 (OHIO ST 10-6)
- OHIO ST – , 0:27 (OHIO ST 17-6)

Third quarter

- OHIO ST – , 2:13 (OHIO ST 24-6)

Fourth quarter

- STAN – , 13:15 (OHIO ST 24-12)
- STAN – , 9:00 (OHIO ST 24-19)

Statistics	OHIO ST	STAN
First downs		
Total yards		
Rushing yards		
Passing yards		
Passing: Comp–Att–Int		
Time of possession		

Team	Category	Player	Statistics
Ohio State	Passing		
Ohio State	Rushing		
Ohio State	Receiving		
Stanford	Passing		
Stanford	Rushing		
Stanford	Receiving		

=== California ===
California at Stanford

Team	1	2	3	4	Total
California	7	0	7	7	21
• Stanford	7	14	14	7	42

- Date: Saturday, November 21
- Location: Stanford Stadium, Stanford, California
- Game attendance: 84,563
- Source: Eugene Register-Guard

Scoring summary
1	STAN	Elway 1-yard run (Harmon kick)	STAN 7-0
1	CAL	Eddings 48-yard pass from Torchio (Cooper kick)	Tied 7-7
2	STAN	Nelson 2-yard run (Harmon kick)	STAN 14-7
2	STAN	Nelson 7-yard pass from Elway (Harmon kick)	STAN 21-7
3	STAN	Hutchings 14-yard interception return (Harmon kick)	STAN 28-7
3	CAL	Tuggle 2-yard run (Cooper kick)	STAN 28-14
3	STAN	White 8-yard pass from Elway (Harmon kick)	STAN 35-14
4	CAL	Wright 18-yard pass from Torchio (Cooper kick)	STAN 35-21
4	STAN	White 22-yard pass from Elway (Harmon kick)	STAN 42-21

== Roster ==
1981 Stanford Cardinal football team roster
Players
Coaches
Offense

Pos.	#	Name	Class
TE	83	Chris Dressel	Jr
QB	7	John Elway	Jr
HB	31	Darrin Nelson	Sr

Defense

Pos.	#	Name	Class

Special teams

Pos.	#	Name	Class

Head coach

- Paul Wiggin

Coordinators/assistant coaches

- Jim Fassel – Offensive Coordinator
- Jim Anderson – Running back
- Dick James – Offensive line
- Dave Ottmar – Tight end
- Jack Harbaugh – Defensive Coordinator
- Larry Mac Duff – Defensive line
- Ray Handley – Outside linebacker
- Chuck Detwiler – Defensive back

Legend

- (C) Team captain
- (S) Suspended
- (I) Ineligible
- Injured
- Redshirt
