= 1981 Arizona State Sun Devils football team =

American college football season

1981 Arizona State Sun Devils football
- Conference: Pacific-10 Conference

Ranking
- AP: No. 16
- Record: 9–2 (5–2 Pac-10)
- Head coach: Darryl Rogers (2nd season)
- Offensive coordinator: Bob Baker (2nd season)
- Defensive coordinator: George Dyer (2nd season)
- Home stadium: Sun Devil Stadium

1981 Pacific-10 Conference football standings
	Conf.					Overall
Team	W		L		T	W		L		T
No. 10 Washington $	6	–	2	–	0	10	–	2	–	0
No. 16 Arizona State	5	–	2	–	0	9	–	2	–	0
No. 14 USC	5	–	2	–	0	9	–	3	–	0
Washington State	5	–	2	–	1	8	–	3	–	1
UCLA	5	–	2	–	1	7	–	4	–	1
Arizona	4	–	4	–	0	6	–	5	–	0
Stanford	4	–	4	–	0	4	–	7	–	0
California	2	–	6	–	0	2	–	9	–	0
Oregon	1	–	6	–	0	2	–	9	–	0
Oregon State	0	–	7	–	0	1	–	10	–	0
$ – Conference champion; Rankings from AP Poll

The 1981 Arizona State Sun Devils football team was an American football team that represented Arizona State University in the Pacific-10 Conference (Pac-10) during the 1981 NCAA Division I-A football season. In their second season under head coach Darryl Rogers, the Sun Devils compiled a 9–2 record (5–2 against Pac-10 opponents), finished in a tie for second place in the Pac-10, and outscored their opponents by a combined total of 394 to 193.

The team's statistical leaders included Mike Pagel with 2,484 passing yards, Gerald Riggs with 891 rushing yards and Bernard Henry with 647 receiving yards.

The team was on probation, making them ineligible for a bowl game.

== Schedule ==
Date	Opponent	Rank	Site	Result	Attendance	Source
September 12	Utah*	No. 20	Sun Devil Stadium; Tempe, AZ	W 52–10	64,558	
September 19	Wichita State*	No. 18	Sun Devil Stadium; Tempe, AZ	W 33–21	61,100	
September 26	at Washington State	No. 18	Martin Stadium; Pullman, WA	L 21–24	24,481	
October 3	at No. 12 Washington		Husky Stadium; Seattle, WA	W 26–7	50,410	
October 10	Oregon		Sun Devil Stadium; Tempe, AZ	W 24–0	63,935	
October 17	California	No. 20	Sun Devil Stadium; Tempe, AZ	W 45–17	63,110	
October 24	at Stanford	No. 17	Stanford Stadium; Stanford, CA	W 62–36	52,855	
October 31	San Jose State*	No. 10	Sun Devil Stadium; Tempe, AZ	W 31–24	65,728	
November 14	at No. 18 UCLA	No. 9	Rose Bowl; Pasadena, CA	L 24–34	47,361	
November 21	Colorado State*	No. 20	Sun Devil Stadium; Tempe, AZ	W 52–7	61,008	
November 28	Arizona	No. 18	Sun Devil Stadium; Tempe, AZ (rivalry)	W 24–13	72,445	
*Non-conference game; Rankings from AP Poll released prior to the game

== Personnel ==
1981 Arizona State Sun Devils football team roster
Players
Coaches
Offense

Pos.	#	Name	Class
QB	11	Sandy Osiecki	Jr
QB	10	Mike Pagel	Sr
RB	37	Gerald Riggs	Sr

Defense

Pos.	#	Name	Class

Special teams

Pos.	#	Name	Class
K		Luis Zendejas	Fr

Head coach

- Darryl Rogers

Coordinators/assistant coaches

- Al Luginbill – Linebackers

Legend

- (C) Team captain
- (S) Suspended
- (I) Ineligible
- Injured
- Redshirt
