= 1981 Iowa Hawkeyes football team =

American college football season

1981 Iowa Hawkeyes football

Big Ten co-champion

Rose Bowl, L 0–28 vs. Washington
- Conference: Big Ten Conference

Ranking
- Coaches: No. 15
- AP: No. 18
- Record: 8–4 (6–2 Big Ten)
- Head coach: Hayden Fry (3rd season)
- Offensive coordinator: Bill Snyder (3rd season)
- Offensive scheme: Pro-style
- Defensive coordinator: Bill Brashier (3rd season)
- Base defense: 5–2
- MVP: Mel Cole
- Captains: Tracy Crocker; Pete Gales; Bruce Kittle; Andre Tippett; Brad Webb
- Home stadium: Kinnick Stadium

1981 Big Ten Conference football standings
	Conf.					Overall
Team	W		L		T	W		L		T
No. 15 Ohio State +	6	–	2	–	0	9	–	3	–	0
No. 18 Iowa +	6	–	2	–	0	8	–	4	–	0
No. 12 Michigan	6	–	3	–	0	9	–	3	–	0
Illinois	6	–	3	–	0	7	–	4	–	0
Wisconsin	6	–	3	–	0	7	–	5	–	0
Minnesota	4	–	5	–	0	6	–	5	–	0
Michigan State	4	–	5	–	0	5	–	6	–	0
Purdue	3	–	6	–	0	5	–	6	–	0
Indiana	3	–	6	–	0	3	–	8	–	0
Northwestern	0	–	9	–	0	0	–	11	–	0
+ – Conference co-champions; Rankings from AP Poll

The 1981 Iowa Hawkeyes football team was an American football team that represented the University of Iowa in the Big Ten Conference during the 1981 Big Ten football season. In their third season under head coach Hayden Fry, the Hawkeyes compiled an 8–4 record (6–2 in conference games), tied with Ohio State for the Big Ten championship, and outscored opponents by a total of 260 to 129. Iowa received the Big Ten's spot in the 1982 Rose Bowl, losing to Washington. It was Iowa's first winning season since 1961 and its first Rose Bowl since the 1958 season. They were ranked No. 15 in the final UPI poll and No. 18 in the final AP poll.

The team limited opponents to only 79.7 rushing yards per game and 2.4 yards per carry, both of which remain Iowa single-season records. Two Iowa players were consensus All-Americans in 1981: defensive end Andre Tippett and punter Reggie Roby. Seven Iowa players received first-team honors on the 1981 All-Big Ten Conference football team: Tippett (AP-1, UPI-1); Roby (AP-1, UPI-1); defensive lineman Pat Dean (AP-1, UPI-1); guard Mark Bortz (AP-1, UPI-1); linebacker Mel Cole (AP-1, UPI-1); guard Ron Hallstrom (AP-2, UPI-1); and defensive back Lou King (AP-1). King led the Big Ten with eight interceptions.

Kirk Ferentz joined the Iowa coaching staff as the offensive line coach in 1981.

== Schedule ==
Date	Opponent	Rank	Site	TV	Result	Attendance	Source
September 12	No. 7 Nebraska*		Kinnick Stadium; Iowa City, IA		W 10–7	60,160	
September 19	at Iowa State*		Cyclone Stadium; Ames, IA (rivalry)		L 12–23	53,922	
September 26	No. 6 UCLA*		Kinnick Stadium; Iowa City, IA		W 20–7	60,004	
October 3	at Northwestern	No. 18	Dyche Stadium; Evanston, IL		W 64–0	30,113	
October 10	Indiana^{†}	No. 15	Kinnick Stadium; Iowa City, IA		W 42–28	60,000	
October 17	at No. 5 Michigan	No. 12	Michigan Stadium; Ann Arbor, MI		W 9–7	105,915	
October 24	Minnesota	No. 6	Kinnick Stadium; Iowa City, IA (rivalry)	ABC	L 10–12	60,000	
October 31	at Illinois	No. 16	Memorial Stadium; Champaign, IL		L 7–24	66,877	
November 7	Purdue		Kinnick Stadium; Iowa City, IA		W 33–7	60,114	
November 14	at Wisconsin		Camp Randall Stadium; Madison, WI	ESPN	W 17–7	78,731	
November 21	Michigan State	No. 19	Kinnick Stadium; Iowa City, IA		W 36–7	60,103	
January 1	vs. No. 12 Washington*	No. 13	Rose Bowl; Pasadena, CA (Rose Bowl)	NBC	L 0–28	105,611	
*Non-conference game; ^{†}Homecoming; Rankings from AP Poll released prior to the game

In 1981, Iowa played eight conference games, missing one opponent. The government of Iowa mandated that they resume their series with Iowa State.
Iowa did not play Ohio State in 1981; OSU was also 8-3 and 6-2 in the Big Ten to tie for the conference title. The Buckeyes won their bowl game, the 1981 Liberty Bowl over Navy, and finished at 9-3. Iowa was awarded the Rose Bowl berth because it had not been to Pasadena since the 1958 season, while Ohio State went two years earlier.

== Rankings ==
Ranking movements Legend: ██ Increase in ranking ██ Decrease in ranking — = Not ranked
	Week														
Poll	Pre	1	2	3	4	5	6	7	8	9	10	11	12	13	Final
AP	—	—	—	—	18	15	12	6	16	—	—	19	13	13	18
Coaches	—	—	—	—	20	15	12	7	16	—	18	17	11	11	15

== Game summaries ==
=== No. 7 Nebraska ===
#7 Nebraska at Iowa

Team	1	2	3	4	Total
No. 7 Cornhuskers	0	0	0	7	7
• Hawkeyes	7	3	0	0	10

- Date: September 12, 1981
- Location: Kinnick Stadium, Iowa City, Iowa
- Game attendance: 60,160
- Referee: John Nealon
- Sources: Box Score

Scoring summary
1	9:16	Iowa	Eddie Phillips 2-yard run (Olejniczak kick)	Iowa 7-0
2	14:55	Iowa	Olejniczak 35-yard field goal	Iowa 10-0
4	11:42	Neb	Roger Craig 1-yard run (kick)	Iowa 10-7

=== At Iowa State ===
Iowa at Iowa State

Team	1	2	3	4	Total
Hawkeyes	0	6	0	6	12
• Cyclones	10	7	3	3	23

- Date: September 19, 1981
- Location: Cyclone Stadium, Ames, Iowa
- Game attendance: 53,922
- Sources: Box Score and Game Story

Scoring summary
1	ISU	Quinn 7-yard run (Giffords kick)	ISU 7-0
1	ISU	Giffords 48-yard field goal	ISU 10-0
2	ISU	Crutchfield 3-yard run (Giffords kick)	ISU 17-0
2	Iowa	Phillips 1-yard run (kick blocked)	ISU 17-6
3	ISU	Giffords 40-yard field goal	ISU 20-6
4	ISU	Giffords 34-yard field goal	ISU 23-6
4	Iowa	Blatcher 1-yard run (pass failed)	ISU 23-12

=== No. 6 UCLA ===
#6 UCLA at Iowa

Team	1	2	3	4	Total
No. 6 Bruins	0	7	0	0	7
• Hawkeyes	7	0	3	10	20

- Date: September 26
- Location: Kinnick Stadium • Iowa City, Iowa
- Game start: 1:05 p.m. CDT
- Elapsed time: 2:45
- Game attendance: 60,004
- Referee: Glen Fortin
- Sources: Box Score

Scoring summary
1	5:02	Iowa	Gales 16-yard run (Olejniczak kick)	Iowa 7-0
2	10:47	UCLA	Tom Ramsey 1-yard run (Johnson kick)	Tied 7-7
3	9:48	Iowa	Nichol 35-yard field goal	Iowa 10-7
4	13:37	Iowa	Mark Bortz recovered fumble in end zone (Nichol kick)	Iowa 17-7
4	6:24	Iowa	Nichol 43-yard field goal	Iowa 20-7

=== at Northwestern ===
#18 Iowa at Northwestern

Team	1	2	3	4	Total
• No. 18 Hawkeyes	30	0	20	14	64
Wildcats	0	0	0	0	0

- Date: October 3, 1981
- Location: Dyche Stadium, Evanston, Illinois
- Game start: 1:00 p.m. CDT
- Game attendance: 30,113
- Referee: Otho Kortz
- Sources: Box Score and Game Story

Scoring summary
1	13:39	Iowa	Phillips 12-yard run (Nichol kick)	Iowa 7-0
1	11:29	Iowa	Granger 6-yard run (Nichol kick)	Iowa 14-0
1	8:52	Iowa	King blocked punt for a safety	Iowa 16-0
1	6:39	Iowa	Phillips 15-yard run (Nichol kick)	Iowa 23-0
1	4:43	Iowa	Webb 29-yard interception return (Nichol kick)	Iowa 30-0
3	13:15	Iowa	Brown 24-yard pass for Bohannon (Nichol kick)	Iowa 37-0
3	11:34	Iowa	Moritz 26-yard pass for Bohannon (kick failed)	Iowa 43-0
3	2:40	Iowa	Gill 20-yard run (Nichol kick)	Iowa 50-0
4	6:58	Iowa	Buggs 2-yard run (Nichol kick)	Iowa 57-0
4	5:46	Iowa	Brown 74-yard punt return (Nichol kick)	Iowa 64-0

=== Indiana ===
Indiana at #15 Iowa

Team	1	2	3	4	Total
Hoosiers	7	7	7	7	28
• No. 15 Hawkeyes	14	21	7	0	42

- Date: October 10
- Location: Kinnick Stadium • Iowa City, Iowa
- Game start: 1:05 p.m. CDT
- Elapsed time: 3:11
- Game attendance: 60,000
- Referee: Tom Quinn
- Sources: Box Score

Scoring summary
1	13:14	Indiana	Gunn 58-yard pass from Laufenberg (Greenstein kick)	Indiana 7-0
1	8:27	Iowa	Granger 2-yard run (Nichol kick)	Tied 7-7
1	0:54	Iowa	Jones 51-yard pass from Bohannon (Nichol kick)	Iowa 14-7
2	10:40	Indiana	Roggeman 1-yard run (Greenstein kick)	Tied 14-14
2	10:24	Iowa	Granger 99-yard kick return (Nichol kick)	Iowa 21-14
2	8:41	Iowa	Hufford 21-yard pass from Bohannon (Nichol kick)	Iowa 28-14
2	6:04	Iowa	Blatcher 1-yard run (Nichol kick)	Iowa 35-14
3	13:05	Indiana	Gunn 71-yard pass from Laufenberg (Greenstein kick)	Iowa 35-21
3	11:08	Iowa	Hufford 11-yard pass from Bohannon (Nichol kick)	Iowa 42-21
4	3:12	Indiana	Hines 2-yard run (Greenstein kick)	Iowa 42-28

=== At No. 5 Michigan ===
#12 Iowa at #5 Michigan

Team	1	2	3	4	Total
• No. 12 Hawkeyes	6	0	3	0	9
No. 5 Wolverines	0	7	0	0	7

- Date: October 17
- Location: Michigan Stadium • Ann Arbor, Michigan
- Game attendance: 105,915
- Sources: Box Score and Game Story

Scoring summary
Q1	IOWA	Tom Nichol 20-yard field goal	IOWA 3–0
Q1	Iowa	Nichol 36-yard field goal	IOWA 6–0
Q2	MICH	Anthony Carter 17-yard pass from Steve Smith (Haji-Sheikh kick)	MICH 7–6
Q3	IOWA	Nichol 30-yard field goal	IOWA 9–7

The Hawkeyes won 9-7 at #5 Michigan, their third victory over a top ten team during the 1981 season. It was Iowa's first victory over the Wolverines since 1962.

=== Minnesota ===
Minnesota at #6 Iowa

Team	1	2	3	4	Total
• Golden Gophers	0	9	0	3	12
No. 6 Hawkeyes	0	0	10	0	10

- Date: October 24
- Location: Kinnick Stadium, Iowa City, Iowa
- Game attendance: 60,000
- Television network: ABC
- Sources: Box Score and Game Story

Scoring summary
2		Minn	Gallery 52-yard field goal	Minn 3-0
2		Minn	Gallery 31-yard field goal	Minn 6-0
2		Minn	Gallery 33-yard field goal	Minn 9-0
3		IOWA	Nichol 34-yard field goal	Minn 9-3
3		IOWA	Blatcher 2-yard run (Nichol kick)	IOWA 10-9
4	2:22	Minn	Gallery 27-yard field goal	Minn 12-10

=== At Illinois ===
#16 Iowa at Illinois

Team	1	2	3	4	Total
#16 Hawkeyes	0	7	0	0	7
• Fighting Illini	3	14	0	7	24

- Date: October 31, 1981
- Location: Memorial Stadium, Champaign, Illinois
- Game attendance: 66,877
- Sources: Box Score and Game Story

Scoring summary
1	Illinois	Bass 27-yard field goal	Illinois 3-0
2	Illinois	Burgard fumble recovery in end zone (Bass kick)	Illinois 10-0
2	Illinois	Williams 56-yard pass from Eason (Bass kick)	Illinois 17-0
2	Iowa	Brown 12-yard pass from Bohannon (Nichol kick)	Illinois 17-7
4	Illinois	Williams 4-yard pass from Eason (Bass kick)	Illinois 24-7

=== Purdue ===
Purdue at Iowa

Team	1	2	3	4	Total
Boilermakers	0	0	0	7	7
• Hawkeyes	17	13	3	0	33

- Date: November 7
- Location: Kinnick Stadium • Iowa City, Iowa
- Game attendance: 60,114
- Sources: Box Score and Game Story

Scoring summary
1	Iowa	Nichol 42-yard field goal	Iowa 3-0
1	Iowa	Blatcher 1-yard run (Nichol kick)	Iowa 10-0
1	Iowa	Bohannon 12-yard run (Nichol kick)	Iowa 17-0
2	Iowa	Crocker recovered blocked punt in end zone (kick failed)	Iowa 23-0
2	Iowa	Bohannon 7-yard run (Nichol kick)	Iowa 30-0
3	Iowa	Nichol 48-yard field goal	Iowa 33-0
4	Purdue	Feulner 1-yard run (Clark kick)	Iowa 33-7

The 33-7 win was Iowa's first over the Boilermakers since 1960, and secured the Hawkeyes' first winning season since 1961.

=== At Wisconsin ===
Iowa at Wisconsin

Team	1	2	3	4	Total
• Hawkeyes	3	14	0	0	17
Badgers	0	0	0	7	7

- Date: November 14
- Location: Camp Randall Stadium • Madison, Wisconsin
- Game attendance: 78,731
- Television network: ABC Sports
- Sources: Box Score and Game Story

Scoring summary
Q1	6:48	IOWA	Tom Nichol 35-yard field goal	IOWA 3–0
Q2		IOWA	Phil Blatcher 1-yard run (Tom Nichol kick)	IOWA 10–0
Q2		IOWA	Phil Blatcher 2-yard run (Tom Nichol kick)	IOWA 17–0
Q4		Wisc		IOWA 17–7

=== Michigan State ===
Michigan State at #19 Iowa

Team	1	2	3	4	Total
Spartans	0	7	0	0	7
• Hawkeyes	16	0	10	10	36

- Date: November 21
- Location: Kinnick Stadium, Iowa City, Iowa
- Game attendance: 60,103
- Game weather: Mid-60s°F
- Sources: Box Score and Game Story

Scoring summary
1	Iowa	Blatcher 9-yard run (Nichol kick)	IOWA 7-0
1	Iowa	Safety, blocked punt through end zone	IOWA 9-0
1	Iowa	Phillips 1-yard run (Nichol kick)	IOWA 16-0
2	Michigan St	Hodo 1-yard pass from Clark (Andersen kick)	IOWA 16-7
3	Iowa	Nichol 26-yard field goal	IOWA 19-7
3	Iowa	Blatcher 1-yard run (Nichol kick)	IOWA 26-7
4	Iowa	Nichol 23-yard field goal	IOWA 29-7
4	Iowa	Campbell 9-yard pass from Gales (Nichol kick)	IOWA 36-7

Iowa earns first Rose Bowl since 1958 with Michigan's loss to Ohio State, which was announced with 6:14 left in the first quarter.

Statistics

- Phil Blatcher 27 Rush, 247 Yds

=== vs. No. 12 Washington (Rose Bowl) ===
#12 Washington vs. #13 Iowa

Team	1	2	3	4	Total
• Huskies	0	13	0	15	28
Hawkeyes	0	0	0	0	0

- Date: January 1, 1982
- Location: Rose Bowl, Pasadena, California
- Game attendance: 105,611
- Referee: Rich McVay
- TV announcers (NBC): Dick Enberg, Merlin Olsen

Scoring summary
2	UW	Robinson 1-yard run (Nelson kick)	UW 7-0
2	UW	Coby 1-yard run (pass failed)	UW 13-0
4	UW	Robinson 34-yard run (Pelluer pass to Skansi)	UW 21-0
4	UW	Cowan 3-yard run (Nelson kick)	UW 28-0

== Roster ==
1981 Iowa Hawkeyes football team roster
Players
Coaches
Offense

Pos.	#	Name	Class
TE	87	John Alt	So
C	69	Bill Bailey	So
RB	28	Phil Blatcher	Sr
QB	11	Gordy Bohannon	Sr
WR	27	Jeff Brown	Jr
QB	8	Dave Chambers	Jr
QB	12	Pete Gales (C)	Sr
RB	33	Owen Gill	Fr
RB	26	Norm Granger	So
G	76	Ron Hallstrom	Sr
C	53	Joel Hilgenberg	So
OT		Bruce Kittle (injured) (C)	Sr
G	55	Joe Levelis	So
QB	16	Chuck Long	Fr
OT	65	Dave Mayhan	Sr
OT	79	Brett Miller	Jr
WR	5	Dave Moritz	So
WR	83	Lon Olejniczak (injured)	Jr
RB	22	Eddie Phillips	So
OT	71	Paul Postler	Sr
G	66	Jon Roehlk	So
WB	25	Ivory Webb	Sr

Defense

Pos.	#	Name	Class
DL	63	Mark Bortz	Jr
LB	31	Mel Cole	Sr
LB	32	James Erb	Jr
DB	46	Tracy Crocker (C)	Sr
DL	58	Pat Dean	Sr
DB	10	Jim Frazier	Sr
DB	43	Lou King	Sr
DT	77	George Little	Fr
DL	74	Jim Pekar	Sr
LB	37	Todd Simonsen	Sr
DB	41	Bob Stoops	Jr
DB	2	Mike Stoops	So
DE	99	Andre Tippett (C)	Sr
DL	94	Brad Webb (C)	Sr

Special teams

Pos.	#	Name	Class
K	3	Tom Nichol	Fr
K	83	Lon Olejniczak	Jr
P	7	Reggie Roby	Jr

Head coach

- Hayden Fry

Coordinators/assistant coaches

- Bill Snyder – Offensive coordinator/quarterbacks
- Bill Brashier – Defensive coordinator
- Kirk Ferentz – Offensive line
- Carl Jackson – Running backs
- Del Miller – Offensive assistant
- Dan McCarney – Defensive line
- Barry Alvarez – Linebackers
- Don Patterson – Defensive Backs
- Bernie Wyatt – Defensive ends/recruiting coordinator
- Bill Dervich – Strength and conditioning

Legend

- (C) Team captain
- (S) Suspended
- (I) Ineligible
- Injured
- Redshirt

== Statistical achievements ==
Iowa tallied 2,153 rushing yards and 1,422 passing yards in 1981. On defense, they held opponents to 953 rushing yards and 1,834 passing yards. The team limited opponents to only 79.7 rushing yards per game and 2.4 yards per carry, both of which remain Iowa single-season records.

The team's individual statistical leaders included:

- Gordy Bohannon completed 72 of 142 passes (50.7%) for 999 yards, six touchdowns, seven interceptions, and a 113.9 passer rating. Freshman Chuck Long completed one pass for 15 yards.
- Phil Blatcher led the team with 737 rushing yards on 145 carries for an average of 4.9 yards per carry. He was selected as the UPI Midwest Offensive Player of the Week after tallying 247 rushing yards against Michigan State. Blatcher ranked second on the team in soring with 48 points.
- The team's leading receivers were Dave Moitz (17 receptions for 390 yards) and Jeff Brown (20 receptions for 301 yards).
- Kicker Tom Nichol led the team in scoring with 59 points on 11 field goals and 26 extra points.
- Linebacker Mel Cole led the team with 94 total tackles.
- Defensive back Lou King led the team with eight interceptions. His eight interceptions remains tied for the Iowa single-season record.

Total attendance at home games was 360,381, an average of 60,063 per game. It was the first team Iowa drew an average of at least 60,000 spectators per game.

== Awards and honors ==
Two Iowa players were selected as consensus first-team All-Americans. Defensive end Andre Tippett, a team captain, set Iowa's all-time record in 1980 with 20 tackles for losses totaling 153 yards and received the consensus All-America recogniation in 1981. Punter Reggie Roby broke the NCAA record with an average of 49.8 yards per punt and also received consensus All-America recognition. Roby averaged 55.8 yards per punt against Nebraska on September 12, 1981.

Linebacker Mel Cole, the team's leading tackler, was selected as the team's most valuable player.

Hayden Fry was selected by the media for the Big Ten Coach of the Year award. He was the first Iowa coach to receive the honor.

Seven Iowa players received first-team honors from the Associated Press (AP) or United Press International (UPI) on the 1981 All-Big Ten Conference football team: Tippett (AP-1, UPI-1); Roby (AP-1, UPI-1); defensive linemen Pat Dean (AP-1, UPI-1); linebacker Mel Coe (AP-1, UPI-1) guard Mark Bortz (AP-1, UPI-2); guard Ron Hallstrom (AP-2, UPI-1); and defensive back Lou King (AP-1).

The team had five co-captains: defensive back Tracy Crocker; quarterback Pete Gales; offensive tackle Bruce Kittle; defensive end Andre Tippett; and defensive end Brad Webb.

== 1982 NFL draft ==
Player	Position	Round	Pick	NFL club
Ron Hallstrom	Guard	1	22	Green Bay Packers
Andre Tippett	Linebacker	2	41	New England Patriots
