= Ricky Turner =

American football player (born 1962)

No. 12
- Position: Quarterback

Personal information
- Born: May 14, 1962 (age 64); Los Angeles, California, U.S.
- Listed height: 6 ft 0 in (1.83 m)
- Listed weight: 190 lb (86 kg)

Career information
- High school: Compton (Compton, California)
- College: Washington State
- NFL draft: 1984: undrafted

Career history
- Toronto Argonauts (1984–1985); Indianapolis Colts (1988)

Career NFL statistics
- TD–INT: 0–0
- Passing yards: 92
- Rushing touchdowns: 2
- Stats at Pro Football Reference

Career CFL statistics
- TD–INT: 4–9
- Passing yards: 1,023

Ricky Turner (born May 14, 1962) is an American former professional football player who was a quarterback in the National Football League (NFL) and Canadian Football League (CFL). He played in the CFL for the Toronto Argonauts and the NFL for the Indianapolis Colts. He played college football for the Washington State Cougars.
