= 1981 NCAA Division I-A football rankings =

- Season: 1981
- Bowl season: 1981–82 bowl games
- Preseason No. 1: Michigan
- End of season champions: Clemson
- Conference with most teams in final AP poll: Big Ten, Big 8, Pac-10 (3)

Two human polls comprised the 1981 National Collegiate Athletic Association (NCAA) Division I-A football rankings. Unlike most sports, college football's governing body, the NCAA, does not bestow a national championship, instead that title is bestowed by one or more different polling agencies. There are two main weekly polls that begin in the preseason—the AP Poll and the Coaches Poll.

== Legend ==
	Increase in ranking
	Decrease in ranking
	Not ranked previous week
	National champion
(#–#)	Win–loss record
(Italics)	Number of first place votes
т	Tied with team above or below also with this symbol

== AP Poll ==
	Preseason Aug 29	Week 1 Sep 7	Week 2 Sep 14	Week 3 Sep 21	Week 4 Sep 28	Week 5 Oct 5	Week 6 Oct 12	Week 7 Oct 19	Week 8 Oct 26	Week 9 Nov 2	Week 10 Nov 9	Week 11 Nov 16	Week 12 Nov 23	Week 13 Nov 30	Week 14 (Final) Jan 3	
1.	Michigan (38)	Michigan (0–0) (37)	Notre Dame (1–0) (24)	USC (2–0) (46)	USC (3–0) (57 1/2)	USC (4–0) (58)	Texas (4–0) (35)	Penn State (5–0) (36 1/2)	Penn State (6–0) (45)	Pittsburgh (7–0) (49)	Pittsburgh (8–0) (53)	Pittsburgh (9–0) (63)	Pittsburgh (10–0) (60)	Clemson (11–0) (63)	Clemson (12–0) (47)	1.
2.	Oklahoma (7)	Alabama (1–0) (11)	USC (1–0) (12)	Oklahoma (1–0) (15)	Penn State (2–0) (5 1/2)	Penn State (3–0) (6)	Penn State (4–0) (24)	Pittsburgh (5–0) (26 1/2)	Pittsburgh (6–0) (19)	Clemson (8–0) (9)	Clemson (9–0) (7)	Clemson (10–0) (5)	Clemson (11–0) (5)	Georgia (10–1) (1)	Texas (10–1–1) (1)	2.
3.	Notre Dame (7)	Oklahoma (0–0)	Oklahoma (1–0) (12)	Penn State (1–0) (2)	Texas (3–0) (1)	Texas (3–0) (1)	Pittsburgh (4–0) (3)	North Carolina (6–0) (3)	Clemson (7–0)	USC (7–1) (7)	USC (8–1) (8)	Georgia (9–1)	Georgia (9–1)	Alabama (9–1–1)	Penn State (10–2) (1)	3.
4.	Alabama (3)	Notre Dame (0–0) (4)	Georgia (2–0) (12)	Texas (2–0) (1)	Pittsburgh (2–0)	Pittsburgh (3–0)	North Carolina (5–0) (4)	Clemson (6–0)	USC (6–1)	Georgia (7–1)	Georgia (8–1)	Alabama (8–1–1)	Alabama (8–1–1)	Nebraska (9–2) (1)	Pittsburgh (11–1)	4.
5.	USC (5)	USC (0–0) (3)	Penn State (1–0) (1)	Pittsburgh (2–0)	Oklahoma (1–1)	North Carolina (4–0)	Michigan (4–1)	USC (5–1)	Georgia (6–1)	Texas (6–1)	Penn State (7–1)	Nebraska (8–2)	Nebraska (9–2)	SMU (10–1) (1)	SMU (10–1) (1)	5.
6.	Nebraska	Georgia (1–0) (4)	Texas (1–0) (1)	UCLA (2–0)	North Carolina (3–0)	Michigan (3–1)	Clemson (5–0)	Iowa (5–1)	Texas (5–1)	Penn State (6–1)	Alabama (7–1–1)	SMU (9–1)	SMU (10–1)	Texas (9–1–1)	Georgia (10–2)	6.
7.	Penn State (1)	Nebraska (0–0)	Pittsburgh (1–0)	Michigan (1–1) (1)	Ohio State (3–0)	Alabama (4–1)	USC (4–1)	Georgia (5–1)	Mississippi State (6–1)	Alabama (7–1–1)	Nebraska (7–2)	Michigan (8–2)	Texas (8–1–1)	Penn State (9–2) (1)	Alabama (9–2–1)	7.
8.	Pittsburgh	Texas (0–0)	Ohio State (1–0)	Ohio State (2–0)	Michigan (2–1)	BYU (5–0)	Missouri (5–0)	SMU (6–0)	Alabama (6–1–1)	North Carolina (7–1)	SMU (8–1)	Texas (7–1–1)	USC (9–2)	USC (9–2)	Miami (FL) (9–2)	8.
9.	Texas	Penn State (0–0)	UCLA (1–0)	North Carolina (2–0)	Mississippi State (3–0)	Clemson (4–0)	Georgia (4–1)	Mississippi State (5–1)	North Carolina (6–1)	Arizona State (6–1)	Arizona State (7–1)	Southern Miss (8–0–1)	Miami (FL) (8–2)	Miami (FL) (9–2) (1)	North Carolina (10–2)	9.
10.	Georgia	Pittsburgh (1–0)	North Carolina (1–0)	Alabama (2–1)	BYU (4–0)	Oklahoma (1–1–1)	SMU (5–0)	Texas (4–1)	Arizona State (6–1)	SMU (7–1)	Texas (6–1–1)	USC (8–2)	North Carolina (9–2)	Pittsburgh (10–1)	Washington (10–2)	10.
11.	Ohio State (1)	Ohio State (0–0)	Michigan (0–1)	BYU (3–0)	Alabama (3–1)	Georgia (3–1)	Florida State (4–1)	Alabama (5–1–1)	Iowa State (5–1–1)	Nebraska (6–2)	Michigan (7–2)	Miami (FL) (7–2)	Penn State (8–2)	North Carolina (9–2)	Nebraska (9–3)	11.
12.	North Carolina	UCLA (0–0)	Alabama (1–1)	Mississippi State (2–0)	Washington (3–0)	Iowa State (3–0–1)	Iowa (4–1)	Arkansas (5–1)	Nebraska (5–2)	Michigan (6–2)	Miami (FL) (6–2)	North Carolina (8–2)	Washington (9–2)	Washington (9–2)	Michigan (9–3)	12.
13.	UCLA	North Carolina (0–0)	BYU (2–0)	Notre Dame (1–1)	Georgia (3–1)	Missouri (4–0)	Miami (FL) (3–1)	BYU (6–1)	SMU (6–1)	Miami (FL) (5–2)	North Carolina (7–2)	Penn State (7–2)	Iowa (8–3)	Iowa (8–3)	BYU (11–2)	13.
14.	Mississippi State	Mississippi State (1–0)	Mississippi State (1–0)	Miami (FL) (2–0)	Clemson (3–0)	SMU (4–0)	Wisconsin (4–1)	Iowa State (4–1–1)	Washington State (6–0–1)	Florida State (6–2)	Southern Miss (7–0–1)	Washington State (8–1–1)	BYU (10–2)	BYU (10–2)	USC (9–3)	14.
15.	Washington	BYU (1–0)	Washington (1–0)	Nebraska (1–1)	SMU (4–0)	Iowa (3–1)	Alabama (4–1–1)	Nebraska (4–2)	Michigan (5–2)	Mississippi State (6–2)	Oklahoma (5–2–1)	UCLA (7–2–1)	Ohio State (8–3)	Ohio State (8–3)	Ohio State (9–3)	15.
16.	BYU	Miami (FL) (1–0)	Miami (FL) (1–0)	Washington (2–0)	UCLA (2–1)	Miami (FL) (3–1)	Mississippi State (4–1)	Washington State (5–0–1)	Iowa (5–2)	Washington (7–1)	Arkansas (7–2)	Arkansas (8–2)	Michigan (8–3)	Michigan (8–3)	Arizona State (9–2)	16.
17.	Florida	Washington (0–0)	Nebraska (0–1)	Georgia (2–1)	Miami (FL) (2–1)	UCLA (3–1)	BYU (5–1)	Arizona State (5–1)	Florida State (5–2)	Oklahoma (4–2–1)	Washington State (7–1–1)	Washington (8–2)	Southern Miss (8–1–1)	Arizona State (9–2)	West Virginia (9–3)	17.
18.	Stanford	Florida State (1–0)	Arizona State (1–0)	Arizona State (2–0)	Iowa (2–1)	Ohio State (3–1)	Washington State (5–0)	Michigan (4–2)	Washington (6–1)	Ohio State (6–2)	UCLA (6–2–1)	BYU (9–2)	Arizona State (8–2)	Southern Miss (9–1–1)	Iowa (8–4)	18.
19.	Florida State	Stanford (0–0)	Florida State (2–0)	Clemson (3–0)	Arkansas (3–0)	Mississippi State (3–1)	Nebraska (3–2)	Missouri (5–1)	Oklahoma (3–2–1)	Arkansas (6–2)	Hawaii (7–0)	Iowa (7–3)	UCLA (7–3–1)	UCLA (7–3–1)	Missouri (8–4)	19.
20.	Arizona State	Arizona State (0–0)	Wisconsin (1–0)	SMU (3–0)	Iowa State (3–0)	Florida State (3–1)	Arizona State (4–1)	Florida State (4–2)	Arkansas (5–2)	Southern Miss (6–0–1)	Florida State (6–3)	Arizona State (7–2)	Washington State (8–2–1)	Washington State (8–2–1)	Oklahoma (7–4–1)	20.
	Preseason Aug 29	Week 1 Sep 7	Week 2 Sep 14	Week 3 Sep 21	Week 4 Sep 28	Week 5 Oct 5	Week 6 Oct 12	Week 7 Oct 19	Week 8 Oct 26	Week 9 Nov 2	Week 10 Nov 9	Week 11 Nov 16	Week 12 Nov 23	Week 13 Nov 30	Week 14 (Final) Jan 3	
		Dropped: Florida	Dropped: Stanford	Dropped: Florida State; Wisconsin	Dropped: Notre Dame; Nebraska; Arizona State	Dropped: Washington; Arkansas	Dropped: Oklahoma; Iowa State; UCLA; Ohio State	Dropped: Miami (FL); Wisconsin	Dropped: BYU; Missouri	Dropped: Iowa State; Washington State; Iowa	Dropped: Mississippi State; Washington; Ohio State	Dropped: Oklahoma; Hawaii; Florida State	Dropped: Arkansas	None	Dropped: Southern Miss; UCLA; Washington State	

== Coaches Poll ==
Arizona State, SMU, and Miami (FL) (after a November 3, 1981 ruling) were on probation by the NCAA during the 1981 season; they were therefore ineligible to receive votes in the Coaches Poll.

	Preseason Aug 29	Week 1 Sep 14	Week 2 Sep 21	Week 3 Sep 28	Week 4 Oct 5	Week 5 Oct 12	Week 6 Oct 19	Week 7 Oct 26	Week 8 Nov 2	Week 9 Nov 9	Week 10 Nov 16	Week 11 Nov 23	Week 12 Nov 30	Week 13 (Final) Jan 3	
1.	Michigan (22)	Notre Dame (1–0) (11)	USC (2–0) (28)	USC (3–0) (39)	USC (4–0) (40)	Texas (4–0) (23)	Penn State (5–0) (36)	Penn State (6–0) (40)	Pittsburgh (7–0) (35)	Pittsburgh (8–0) (38)	Pittsburgh (9–0) (40)	Pittsburgh (10–0) (39)	Clemson (11–0)	Clemson (12–0) (35)	1.
2.	Oklahoma (3)	USC (1–0) (10)	Oklahoma (1–0) (10)	Penn State (2–0) (2)	Penn State (3–0) (1)	Penn State (4–0) (19)	Pittsburgh (5–0) (6)	Pittsburgh (6–0) (2)	USC (7–1) (4)	Clemson (9–0) (1)	Clemson (10–0) (2)	Clemson (11–0) (3)	Georgia (10–1)	Pittsburgh (11–1)	2.
3.	Alabama (3)	Oklahoma (1–0) (14)	Penn State (1–0) (1)	Texas (3–0)	Texas (3–0)	Pittsburgh (4–0)	North Carolina (6–0)	USC (6–1)	Clemson (8–0) (2)	USC (8–1) (3)	Georgia (9–1)	Georgia (9–1)	Alabama (9–1–1)	Penn State (10–2) (1)	3.
4.	Notre Dame (5)	Georgia (2–0) (7)	Texas (2–0) (1)	Pittsburgh (2–0)	Pittsburgh (3–0)	North Carolina (5–0)	USC (5–1)	Clemson (7–0)	Georgia (7–1) (1)	Georgia (8–1)	Alabama (8–1–1)	Alabama (8–1–1)	Nebraska (9–2)	Texas (10–1–1) (1)	4.
5.	USC (2)	Penn State (1–0)	Pittsburgh (2–0)	North Carolina (3–0) (1)	North Carolina (4–0)	Michigan (4–1)	Clemson (6–0)	Georgia (6–1)	Texas (6–1)	Penn State (7–1)	Nebraska (8–2)	Nebraska (9–2)	Texas (9–1–1)	Georgia (10–2)	5.
6.	Nebraska	Texas (1–0)	Michigan (1–1)	Oklahoma (1–1)	Michigan (3–1)	USC (4–1)	Georgia (5–1)	Texas (5–1)	Penn State (6–1)	Alabama (7–1–1)	Michigan (8–2)	Texas (8–1–1)	Penn State (9–2)	Alabama (9–2–1)	6.
7.	Penn State (2)	Pittsburgh (1–0)	UCLA (2–0)	Ohio State (3–0)	Alabama (4–1)	Clemson (5–0)	Iowa (5–1)	Alabama (6–1–1)	Alabama (7–1–1)	Nebraska (7–2)	Texas (7–1–1)	USC (9–2)	USC (9–2)	Washington (10–2)	7.
8.	Georgia (4)	Ohio State (1–0)	Ohio State (2–0)	Michigan (2–1)	BYU (5–0)	Missouri (5–0)	Texas (4–1)	Mississippi State (6–1)	Nebraska (6–2)	Michigan (7–2)	Southern Miss (8–0–1)	North Carolina (9–2)	Pittsburgh (10–1)	North Carolina (10–2)	8.
9.	Pittsburgh (1)	North Carolina (1–0)	North Carolina (2–0)	Mississippi State (3–0)	Georgia (3–1)	Georgia (4–1)	Alabama (5–1–1)	Nebraska (5–2)	North Carolina (7–1)	Texas (6–1–1)	USC (8–2)	Penn State (8–2)	North Carolina (9–2)	Nebraska (9–3)	9.
10.	Texas	UCLA (1–0)	Alabama (2–1)	Alabama (3–1)	Clemson (4–0)	Florida State (4–1)	Mississippi State (5–1)	Iowa State (5–1–1)	Michigan (6–2)	Southern Miss (7–0–1)	Arkansas (8–2)	Washington (9–2)	Washington (9–2)	Michigan (9–3)	10.
11.	Ohio State	Alabama (1–1)	Notre Dame (1–1)	BYU (4–0)	Missouri (4–0)	Miami (FL) (3–1)	Nebraska (4–2)	North Carolina (6–1)	Miami (FL) (5–2)	Oklahoma (5–2–1)	North Carolina (8–2)	Iowa (8–3)	Iowa (8–3)	BYU (11–2)	11.
12.	UCLA	Michigan (0–1)	Nebraska (1–1)	Georgia (3–1)	Oklahoma (1–1–1)	Iowa (4–1)	Iowa State (4–1–1)	Washington State (6–0–1)	Washington (7–1)	North Carolina (7–2)	Washington State (8–1–1)	BYU (10–2)	BYU (10–2)	Ohio State (9–3)	12.
13.	Florida State	BYU (2–0)	BYU (3–0)	Washington (3–0)	Miami (FL) (3–1)	Wisconsin (4–1)	Arkansas (5–1)	Oklahoma (3–2–1)	Oklahoma (4–2–1)	Arkansas (7–2)	UCLA (7–2–1)	Michigan (8–3)	Michigan (8–3)	USC (9–3)	13.
14.	North Carolina	Mississippi State (1–0)	Mississippi State (2–0)	Clemson (3–0)	Iowa State (3–0–1)	Alabama (4–1–1)	Washington State (5–0–1)	Michigan (5–2)	Florida State (6–2)	UCLA (6–2–1)	Penn State (7–2)	Ohio State (8–3)	Ohio State (8–3)	Oklahoma (7–4–1)	14.
15.	Mississippi State	Miami (FL) (1–0)	Miami (FL) (2–0)	Miami (FL) (2–1)	Iowa (3–1)	BYU (5–1)	BYU (6–1)	Washington (6–1)	Mississippi State (6–2)	Washington State (7–1–1)	BYU (9–2)	Southern Miss (8–1–1)	Southern Miss (9–1–1)	Iowa (8–4)	15.
16.	Florida	Florida State (2–0)	Georgia (2–1)	Arkansas (3–0)	UCLA (3–1)	Mississippi State (4–1)	Missouri (5–1)	Iowa (5–2)	Ohio State (6–2)	Hawaii (7–0)	Washington (8–2)	UCLA (7–3–1)	UCLA (7–3–1)	Arkansas (8–4)	16.
17.	Washington	Washington (1–0)	Washington (2–0)	Missouri (3–0)	Ohio State (3–1)	Iowa State (3–1–1)	Oklahoma (2–2–1)	Florida State (5–2)	Arkansas (6–2)	BYU (8–2)	Iowa (7–3)	Arkansas (8–3)	Arkansas (8–3)	Mississippi State (8–4)	17.
18.	Houston	Purdue (1–0)	Clemson (3–0)	UCLA (2–1)	Nebraska (2–2)	Nebraska (3–2)	Washington (5–1)	Ohio State (5–2)	Southern Miss (6–0–1)	Iowa (6–3)	Ohio State (7–3)	Washington State (8–2–1)	Washington State (8–2–1)	West Virginia (9–3)	18.
19.	BYU	Nebraska (0–1)	Florida State (2–1)	Nebraska (1–2)	Florida State (3–1)	Washington State (5–0)	Michigan (4–2)	Miami (FL) (4–2)	Washington State (6–1–1)	Florida State (6–3)	West Virginia (8–2)	Houston (6–3–1)	Houston (7–3–1)	Southern Miss (9–2–1)	19.
20.	Baylor	Wisconsin (1–0)	Arkansas (2–0); West Virginia (2–0)	Iowa (2–1)	Mississippi State (3–1)	Oklahoma (1–2–1)	Florida State (4–2)	Arkansas (5–2)	Iowa State (5–2–1)	Minnesota (6–3)	Missouri (7–3)	San Jose State (8–2)	San Jose State (9–2)	Missouri (8–4)	20.
	Preseason Aug 29	Week 1 Sep 14	Week 2 Sep 21	Week 3 Sep 28	Week 4 Oct 5	Week 5 Oct 12	Week 6 Oct 19	Week 7 Oct 26	Week 8 Nov 2	Week 9 Nov 9	Week 10 Nov 16	Week 11 Nov 23	Week 12 Nov 30	Week 13 (Final) Jan 3	
		Dropped: Florida; Houston; Baylor	Dropped: Purdue; Wisconsin	Dropped: Notre Dame; Florida State; West Virginia	Dropped: Washington; Arkansas	Dropped: UCLA; Ohio State	Dropped: Miami (FL); Wisconsin	Dropped: BYU; Missouri	Dropped: Iowa	Dropped: Miami (FL); Washington; Mississippi State; Ohio State; Iowa State	Dropped: Oklahoma; Hawaii; Florida State; Minnesota	Dropped: West Virginia; Missouri	None	Dropped: UCLA; Washington State; Houston; San Jose State	
