= Billy Alton =

American football coach

Billy Alton is a former American football coach. He served as interim head coach at the University of Texas at El Paso following the firing of Bill Michael two games into the 1981 season. Alton compiled a 1–8 record and was replaced with Bill Yung soon after the season ended. His team's lone win was a 35 to 29 home victory over Colorado State on October 24, 1981.

Alton attended Beth Center High School in Frederickstown, Pennsylvania, where he was involved in many sports. He then attended University of West Virginia where he played on a baseball team as a pitcher and catcher, captaining the squad his final two seasons. He attended one semester of law school before dropping out to become an athletic recruiter for his alma mater. Alton got his coaching career started at West Virginia-Wesleyan coaching both football and baseball before moving to California University of Pennsylvania for the next two seasons. He then coached at Lenoir-Rhyne, Louisville, before becoming an assistant at UTEP. After only two games as defensive coordinator, Alton was tabbed as interim head coach after the firing of Bill Michael. After the 1981 season, Alton applied for the UTEP job but it was given to Bill Yung. He was then the wide receivers coach at West Virginia.

Alton became the supervisor of football officials for the West Virginia Intercollegiate Athletic Conference in 2009.

== Head coaching record ==
Year	Team	Overall	Conference	Standing	Bowl/playoffs
UTEP Miners (Western Athletic Conference) (1981)
1981	UTEP	1–8 (Note: Bill Michael served as head coach before he was fired after two games, both non-conference losses. Alton served as interim head coach for the remaining nine games of the season. UTEP finished the season with a record of 1–10.)	1–6	10th	
UTEP:		1–8	1–6		
Total:		1–8			
