= Aaronsburg =

Aaronsburg may refer to:

- Aaronsburg, Ohio, US
- Aaronsburg, Centre County, Pennsylvania, US
- Aaronsburg, Washington County, Pennsylvania, US
