= 1979 Colorado State Rams football team =

American college football season

1979 Colorado State Rams football
- Conference: Western Athletic Conference
- Record: 4–7–1 (3–4 WAC)
- Head coach: Sark Arslanian (7th season)
- Offensive coordinator: Charles Armey (3rd season)
- Defensive coordinator: Chester Caddas (1st season)
- Home stadium: Hughes Stadium

1979 Western Athletic Conference football standings
	Conf.					Overall
Team	W		L		T	W		L		T
No. 13 BYU $	7	–	0	–	0	11	–	1	–	0
Utah	5	–	2	–	0	6	–	6	–	0
San Diego State	4	–	2	–	0	8	–	3	–	0
Hawaii	3	–	3	–	0	6	–	5	–	0
New Mexico	3	–	4	–	0	6	–	6	–	0
Colorado State	3	–	4	–	0	4	–	7	–	1
Wyoming	2	–	5	–	0	4	–	8	–	0
UTEP	0	–	7	–	0	2	–	9	–	0
$ – Conference champion; Rankings from AP Poll

The 1979 Colorado State Rams football team was an American football team that represented Colorado State University in the Western Athletic Conference (WAC) during the 1979 NCAA Division I-A football season. In its seventh season under head coach Sark Arslanian, the team compiled a 4–7–1 record (3–4 against WAC opponents).

The team's statistical leaders included Keith Lee with 993 passing yards, Alvin Lewis with 635 rushing yards, and Cecil Stockdale with 361 receiving yards.

== Schedule ==
Date	Opponent	Site	Result	Attendance	Source
September 1	at Arizona*	Arizona Stadium; Tucson, AZ	L 17–33	50,323	
September 15	at No. 17 Arkansas*	War Memorial Stadium; Little Rock, AR	L 3–36	55,317	
September 22	at Utah State*	Romney Stadium; Logan, UT	L 6–32	17,960	
September 29	at Wyoming	War Memorial Stadium; Laramie, WY (rivalry)	W 20–16	29,021	
October 6	Utah	Hughes Stadium; Fort Collins, CO	L 16–21	27,257	
October 13	at UTEP	Sun Bowl; El Paso, TX	W 17–3	27,100	
October 20	San Diego State^{†}	Hughes Stadium; Fort Collins, CO	W 37–3	21,950	
October 27	Air Force*	Hughes Stadium; Fort Collins, CO (rivalry)	W 20–6	21,104	
November 3	No. 11 BYU	Hughes Stadium; Fort Collins, CO	L 7–30	25,612	
November 10	New Mexico	Hughes Stadium; Fort Collins, CO	L 9–24	16,273	
November 17	at UNLV*	Sam Boyd Stadium; Whitney, NV	T 21–21	24,607	
November 24	at Hawaii	Aloha Stadium; Halawa, HI	L 10–24	31,812	
*Non-conference game; ^{†}Homecoming; Rankings from AP Poll released prior to the game

== Roster ==
1979 Colorado State Rams football team roster
Players
Coaches
Offense

Pos.	#	Name	Class
TE	83	Rick Dennison	Sr
QB	12	Steve Driscoll	So
QB	4	Keith Lee	Sr
QB	3	Steve Fairchild	Jr

Defense

Pos.	#	Name	Class
DT	91	Mike Call	Fr
LB	44	Dave Jurk	Jr
DB	41	Steve Mog	Fr
DB	47	Greg Tillman	So

Special teams

Pos.	#	Name	Class

Head coach

- Sark Arslanian

Coordinators/assistant coaches

Legend

- (C) Team captain
- (S) Suspended
- (I) Ineligible
- Injured
- Redshirt

== Team players in the NFL ==
Player	Position	Round	Pick	NFL club
Keith Lee	Defensive back	5	129	Buffalo Bills
Dupree Branch	Defensive back	8	198	St. Louis Cardinals
