= 1979 Utah Utes football team =

American college football season

1979 Utah Utes football
- Conference: Western Athletic Conference
- Record: 6–6 (5–2 WAC)
- Head coach: Wayne Howard (3rd season)
- Offensive coordinator: Ron McBride (3rd season)
- Defensive coordinator: Tom Gadd (3rd season)
- Home stadium: Robert Rice Stadium

1979 Western Athletic Conference football standings
	Conf.					Overall
Team	W		L		T	W		L		T
No. 13 BYU $	7	–	0	–	0	11	–	1	–	0
Utah	5	–	2	–	0	6	–	6	–	0
San Diego State	4	–	2	–	0	8	–	3	–	0
Hawaii	3	–	3	–	0	6	–	5	–	0
New Mexico	3	–	4	–	0	6	–	6	–	0
Colorado State	3	–	4	–	0	4	–	7	–	1
Wyoming	2	–	5	–	0	4	–	8	–	0
UTEP	0	–	7	–	0	2	–	9	–	0
$ – Conference champion; Rankings from AP Poll

The 1979 Utah Utes football team was an American football team that represented the University of Utah as a member of the Western Athletic Conference (WAC) during the 1979 NCAA Division I-A football season. In their third season under head coach Wayne Howard, the Utes compiled an overall record of 6–6 with a mark of 5–2 against conference opponents, placing second in the WAC. Home games were played on campus at Robert Rice Stadium in Salt Lake City.

== Schedule ==
Date	Time	Opponent	Site	Result	Attendance	Source
September 1	7:30 pm	Long Beach State*	Robert Rice Stadium; Salt Lake City UT	W 34–10	26,238	
September 8	11:30 pm	Hawaii	Aloha Stadium; Halawa, HI	W 27–23	41,511	
September 15	2:30 pm	at No. 14 Washington*	Husky Stadium; Seattle, WA	L 7–41	49,416	
September 22	5:30 pm	at Tennessee*	Neyland Stadium; Knoxville, TN	L 18–51	85,783	
September 29	7:30 pm	Utah State*	Robert Rice Stadium; Salt Lake City, UT (rivalry)	L 21–47	31,108	
October 6	1:30 pm	at Colorado State	Hughes Stadium; Fort Collins, CO	W 21–16	27,257	
October 13	7:30 pm	Wyoming	Robert Rice Stadium; Salt Lake City, UT	W 24–14	25,258	
October 20	7:30 pm	at UNLV*	Las Vegas Silver Bowl; Whitney, NV	L 41–43	24,782	
October 27	1:30 pm	San Diego State	Robert Rice Stadium; Salt Lake City, UT	L 13–17	22,196	
November 3	4:00 pm	at New Mexico	University Stadium; Albuquerque, NM	W 26–7	19,093	
November 10	1:30 pm	UTEP^{†}	Robert Rice Stadium; Salt Lake City, UT	W 35–0	25,016	
November 17	1:30 pm	at No. 10 BYU	Cougar Stadium; Provo, UT (rivalry)	L 0–27	40,236	
*Non-conference game; ^{†}Homecoming; Rankings from AP Poll released prior to the game; All times are in Mountain time

== Roster ==
1979 Utah Utes football team roster
Players
Coaches
Offense

Pos.	#	Name	Class
QB	12	Tom Banks	Jr
OT	72	Tim Davis	Sr
TE	45	Dan Doubiago	So
OT	76	Scott Folsom	Sr
TE	82	Steve Folsom	Jr
WR	47	Clark Fuller	So
G	68	Darryl Haley	So
WR	80	Cory Hansen	Sr
QB	10	Floyd Hodge	Jr
G	64	Dean Miraldi	Jr
RB	33	Del Rodgers	So
RB	11	Lewis Walker	Sr

Defense

Pos.	#	Name	Class
DE	93	Bob Alvey	Sr
DB	49	Rob Beckwith	Sr
DT	90	Dan Clark	Sr
DT	99	Steve Clark	So
S	2	Derek Daniels	Jr
S	8	Scott Daniels	So
LB	30	Greg Day	So
LB	59	Gary Greene	Sr
DB	1	Jeff Griffin	Jr
LB	41	Mark Padjen	Sr

Special teams

Pos.	#	Name	Class

Head coach

- Wayne Howard

Coordinators/assistant coaches

Legend

- (C) Team captain
- (S) Suspended
- (I) Ineligible
- Injured
- Redshirt

== NFL draft ==
One Utah player was selected in the 1980 NFL draft.

Player	Position	Round	Pick	NFL team
Lewis Walker	Running back	10	268	Washington Redskins
