= 1979 Wyoming Cowboys football team =

American college football season

1979 Wyoming Cowboys football
- Conference: Western Athletic Conference
- Record: 4–8 (2–5 WAC)
- Head coach: Bill Lewis (3rd season)
- Captains: Pat Ogrin; Danny Pittman; Vic Baginski; Mike Dennis; Scott Winfield; Hugh Albora
- Home stadium: War Memorial Stadium

1979 Western Athletic Conference football standings
	Conf.					Overall
Team	W		L		T	W		L		T
No. 13 BYU $	7	–	0	–	0	11	–	1	–	0
Utah	5	–	2	–	0	6	–	6	–	0
San Diego State	4	–	2	–	0	8	–	3	–	0
Hawaii	3	–	3	–	0	6	–	5	–	0
New Mexico	3	–	4	–	0	6	–	6	–	0
Colorado State	3	–	4	–	0	4	–	7	–	1
Wyoming	2	–	5	–	0	4	–	8	–	0
UTEP	0	–	7	–	0	2	–	9	–	0
$ – Conference champion; Rankings from AP Poll

The 1979 Wyoming Cowboys football team was an American football team that represented the University of Wyoming as a member of the Western Athletic Conference (WAC) during the 1979 NCAA Division I-A football season. In their third and final season under head coach Bill Lewis, the Cowboys compiled a 4–8 record (2–5 against conference opponents), finished seventh out of eight teams in the WAC, were outscored by a total of 276 to 186, and played their home games at War Memorial Stadium in Laramie, Wyoming.

For the first time since 1958, Wyoming played a home game in the month of November.

== Schedule ==
Date	Opponent	Site	Result	Attendance	Source
September 8	at No. 15 Washington*	Husky Stadium; Seattle, WA	L 2–38	41,927	
September 15	at Northwestern*	Dyche Stadium; Evanston, IL	L 22–27		
September 22	Richmond*	War Memorial Stadium; Laramie, WY	W 9–7	21,474	
September 29	Colorado State	War Memorial Stadium; Laramie, WY (rivalry)	L 16–20	29,021	
October 6	UTEP	War Memorial Stadium; Laramie, WY	W 23–3	17,508	
October 13	at Utah	Robert Rice Stadium; Salt Lake City, UT	L 14–24	25,258	
October 20	No. 13 BYU	War Memorial Stadium; Laramie, WY	L 14–54	14,723	
October 27	UNLV*	War Memorial Stadium; Laramie, WY	L 24–28	13,637	
November 3	at San Diego State	San Diego Stadium; San Diego, CA	L 21–31	36,386	
November 10	Arkansas State*	War Memorial Stadium; Laramie, WY	W 17–14		
November 17	at Hawaii	Aloha Stadium; Halawa, HI (rivalry)	W 21–13	36,743	
November 24	at New Mexico	University Stadium; Albuquerque, NM	L 3–17	4,700	
*Non-conference game; Rankings from AP Poll released prior to the game

== Roster ==
1979 Wyoming Cowboys football team roster
Players
Coaches
Offense

Pos.	#	Name	Class
QB	16	Phil Davis	So
OT	60	Tom Dragt	So
RB	40	J. C. Flower	Jr
WR	25	Danny Pittman	Sr
WR	1	Andre Plummer	So
QB	12	Greg Tucker	Jr
G	68	Tim Volz	Jr

Defense

Pos.	#	Name	Class
CB	31	Lou Carter	So
LB	55	Scott Corriveau	Jr
LB	59	K. C. Cushing	Fr
FS	23	Mike Dennis	Sr
CB	22	Jerry Eure	Sr
DE	81	Guy Frazier	Jr
DT	72	Don Jessie	Sr
DT	71	Pat Ogrin	Sr

Special teams

Pos.	#	Name	Class
K	5	Wayne Vanderloo	Jr

Head coach

- Bill Lewis (3rd year)

Coordinators/assistant coaches

Legend

- (C) Team captain
- (S) Suspended
- (I) Ineligible
- Injured
- Redshirt
