= Mike Horan =

Mike Horan may refer to:

- Mike Horan (politician)
- Mike Horan (American football)
