= 1981 Hawaii Rainbow Warriors football team =

American college football season

1981 Hawaii Rainbow Warriors football
- Conference: Western Athletic Conference
- Record: 9–2 (5–1 WAC)
- Head coach: Dick Tomey (5th season)
- Home stadium: Aloha Stadium

1981 Western Athletic Conference football standings
	Conf.					Overall
Team	W		L		T	W		L		T
No. 13 BYU $	7	–	1	–	0	11	–	2	–	0
Hawaii	5	–	1	–	0	9	–	2	–	0
Utah	4	–	1	–	1	8	–	2	–	1
Wyoming	6	–	2	–	0	8	–	3	–	0
New Mexico	3	–	4	–	1	4	–	7	–	1
Air Force	2	–	3	–	0	4	–	7	–	0
San Diego State	3	–	5	–	0	6	–	5	–	0
UTEP	1	–	6	–	0	1	–	10	–	0
Colorado State	0	–	8	–	0	0	–	12	–	0
$ – Conference champion; Rankings from AP Poll

The 1981 Hawaii Rainbow Warriors football team was an American football team that represented the University of Hawaii in the Western Athletic Conference (WAC) during the 1981 NCAA Division I-A football season. In their fifth season under head coach Dick Tomey, the Rainbow Warriors compiled an 9–2 record (5–1 against WAC opponents), placed second in the WAC, and outscored opponents by a total of 328 to 130.

== Schedule ==
Date	Opponent	Rank	Site	Result	Attendance	Source
September 19	Cal State Fullerton*		Aloha Stadium; Halawa, HI	W 38–12	45,061	
September 26	Idaho*		Aloha Stadium; Halawa, HI	W 21–6	43,719	
October 10	at Wyoming		War Memorial Stadium; Laramie, WY (rivalry)	W 14–9	19,931	
October 17	New Mexico		Aloha Stadium; Halawa, HI	W 23–13	46,692	
October 24	at San Diego State		Jack Murphy Stadium; San Diego, CA	W 28–10	33,167	
October 31	UNLV*^{†}		Aloha Stadium; Halawa, HI	W 57–21	46,153	
November 7	at UTEP		Sun Bowl; El Paso, TX	W 35–7	9,600	
November 14	BYU	No. 19	Aloha Stadium; Halawa, HI	L 3–13	45,355	
November 21	Pacific (CA)*		Aloha Stadium; Halawa, HI	L 17–23	36,368	
November 28	Colorado State		Aloha Stadium; Halawa, HI	W 59–6	32,955	
December 5	South Carolina*		Aloha Stadium; Halawa, HI	W 33–10	43,958	
*Non-conference game; ^{†}Homecoming; Rankings from Coaches' Poll released prior to the game
