= 1979 Hawaii Rainbow Warriors football team =

American college football season

1979 Hawaii Rainbow Warriors football
- Conference: Western Athletic Conference
- Record: 6–5 (3–3 WAC)
- Head coach: Dick Tomey (3rd season)
- Defensive coordinator: Bob Burt (3rd season)
- Home stadium: Aloha Stadium

1979 Western Athletic Conference football standings
	Conf.					Overall
Team	W		L		T	W		L		T
No. 13 BYU $	7	–	0	–	0	11	–	1	–	0
Utah	5	–	2	–	0	6	–	6	–	0
San Diego State	4	–	2	–	0	8	–	3	–	0
Hawaii	3	–	3	–	0	6	–	5	–	0
New Mexico	3	–	4	–	0	6	–	6	–	0
Colorado State	3	–	4	–	0	4	–	7	–	1
Wyoming	2	–	5	–	0	4	–	8	–	0
UTEP	0	–	7	–	0	2	–	9	–	0
$ – Conference champion; Rankings from AP Poll

The 1979 Hawaii Rainbow Warriors football team represented the University of Hawaii at Manoa in the 1979 NCAA Division I-A football season. Hawaii finished the 1979 season with a 6–5 record and a 3–3 in their first season of Western Athletic Conference (WAC) play. The warriors were led by third-year head coach Dick Tomey.

== Schedule ==
Date	Opponent	Site	Result	Attendance	Source
September 8	Utah	Aloha Stadium; Halawa, HI	L 23–27	41,511	
September 22	New Mexico	Aloha Stadium; Halawa, HI	W 20–3	40,079	
September 29	UNLV*	Aloha Stadium; Halawa, HI	L 31–48	44,143	
October 5	at No. 20 BYU	Cougar Stadium; Provo, UT	L 15–38	34,741	
October 13	Santa Clara*	Aloha Stadium; Halawa, HI	W 52–3	35,455	
October 20	Prairie View A&M*	Aloha Stadium; Halawa, HI	W 65–0	28,839	
October 27	at UTEP	Sun Bowl; El Paso, TX	W 27–12	26,003	
November 3	Temple*^{†}	Aloha Stadium; Halawa, HI	L 31–34	33,742	
November 17	Wyoming	Aloha Stadium; Halawa, HI (rivalry)	L 13–21	36,743	
November 24	Colorado State	Aloha Stadium; Halawa, HI	W 24–10	31,812	
December 1	Arizona State*	Aloha Stadium; Halawa, HI	W 29–17	42,040	
*Non-conference game; ^{†}Homecoming; Rankings from AP Poll released prior to the game
