= 1981 Utah Utes football team =

American college football season

1981 Utah Utes football
- Conference: Western Athletic Conference
- Record: 8–2–1 (4–1–1 WAC)
- Head coach: Wayne Howard (5th season)
- Offensive coordinator: Ron McBride (5th season)
- Defensive coordinator: Tom Gadd (5th season)
- Home stadium: Robert Rice Stadium

1981 Western Athletic Conference football standings
	Conf.					Overall
Team	W		L		T	W		L		T
No. 13 BYU $	7	–	1	–	0	11	–	2	–	0
Hawaii	5	–	1	–	0	9	–	2	–	0
Utah	4	–	1	–	1	8	–	2	–	1
Wyoming	6	–	2	–	0	8	–	3	–	0
New Mexico	3	–	4	–	1	4	–	7	–	1
Air Force	2	–	3	–	0	4	–	7	–	0
San Diego State	3	–	5	–	0	6	–	5	–	0
UTEP	1	–	6	–	0	1	–	10	–	0
Colorado State	0	–	8	–	0	0	–	12	–	0
$ – Conference champion; Rankings from AP Poll

The 1981 Utah Utes football team was an American football team that represented the University of Utah as a member of the Western Athletic Conference (WAC) during the 1981 NCAA Division I-A football season. In their fifth and final season under head coach Wayne Howard, the Utes compiled an overall record of 8–2–1 with a mark of 4–1–1 against conference opponents, tying for third place in the WAC. Home games were played on campus at Robert Rice Stadium in Salt Lake City.

== Schedule ==
Date	Time	Opponent	Site	TV	Result	Attendance	Source
September 5	7:30 pm	Utah State*	Robert Rice Stadium; Salt Lake City, UT (Battle of the Brothers)		W 10–0	29,010	
September 12	8:30 pm	at No. 20 Arizona State*	Sun Devil Stadium; Tempe, AZ		L 10–52	64,558	
September 19	7:30 pm	Portland State*	Robert Rice Stadium; Salt Lake City, UT		W 46–0	24,122	
September 26	12:00 pm	at Northwestern*	Dyche Stadium; Evanston, IL		W 42–0	25,256	
October 2	7:30 pm	UTEP	Robert Rice Stadium; Salt Lake City, UT		W 38–10	26,851	
October 17	1:30 pm	at Colorado State	Hughes Stadium; Fort Collins, CO		W 24–13	15,933	
October 24	8:30 pm	at UNLV*	Las Vegas Silver Bowl; Paradise, NV		W 69–28	27,883	
October 31	1:30 pm	San Diego State^{†}	Robert Rice Stadium; Salt Lake City, UT		W 17–14	28,513	
November 7	7:00 pm	at New Mexico	University Stadium; Albuquerque, NM	ABC	T 7–7	14,420	
November 14	1:30 pm	Wyoming	Robert Rice Stadium; Salt Lake City, UT		W 30–27	28,206	
November 21	1:30 pm	No. 18 BYU	Cougar Stadium; Provo, UT (Holy War)		L 28–56	47,163	
*Non-conference game; ^{†}Homecoming; Rankings from AP Poll released prior to the game; All times are in Mountain time

== Roster ==
1981 Utah Utes football team roster
Players
Coaches
Offense

Pos.	#	Name	Class
OT	76	Jack Campbell	Sr
QB	11	Tyce Ferguson	Sr
G	68	Darryl Haley	Sr
QB	12	Michael Kiel	Fr
RB	25	Carl Monroe	Jr
TE	82	Andy Parker	Jr
RB	33	Del Rodgers	Sr

Defense

Pos.	#	Name	Class
DT	99	Steve Clark	Sr
LB	30	Greg Day	Jr
DT	78	Dan Doubiago	Jr
LB	14	Mike Kunz	Jr

Special teams

Pos.	#	Name	Class

Head coach

- Wayne Howard

Coordinators/assistant coaches

Legend

- (C) Team captain
- (S) Suspended
- (I) Ineligible
- Injured
- Redshirt

== NFL draft ==
Five Utah players were selected in the 1982 NFL draft.

Player	Position	Round	Pick	NFL team
Darryl Haley	Offensive tackle	2	55	New England Patriots
Del Rodgers	Running back	3	71	Green Bay Packers
Jack Campbell	Offensive tackle	6	144	Seattle Seahawks
Steve Clark	Defensive end	9	239	Miami Dolphins
Wayne Jones	Offensive tackle	10	276	Miami Dolphins
