= 1981 Wyoming Cowboys football team =

American college football season

1981 Wyoming Cowboys football
- Conference: Western Athletic Conference
- Record: 8–3 (6–2 WAC)
- Head coach: Al Kincaid (1st season)
- Offensive coordinator: Jack Crowe (1st season)
- Captains: Gary Crum; Phil Davis; Jim Eliopulos
- Home stadium: War Memorial Stadium

1981 Western Athletic Conference football standings
| | Conf. | | | | | Overall |
| Team | W | | L | | T | W | | L | | T |
|---|---|---|---|---|---|---|---|---|---|---|
| No. 13 BYU $ | 7 | – | 1 | – | 0 | 11 | – | 2 | – | 0 |
| Hawaii | 5 | – | 1 | – | 0 | 9 | – | 2 | – | 0 |
| Utah | 4 | – | 1 | – | 1 | 8 | – | 2 | – | 1 |
| Wyoming | 6 | – | 2 | – | 0 | 8 | – | 3 | – | 0 |
| New Mexico | 3 | – | 4 | – | 1 | 4 | – | 7 | – | 1 |
| Air Force | 2 | – | 3 | – | 0 | 4 | – | 7 | – | 0 |
| San Diego State | 3 | – | 5 | – | 0 | 6 | – | 5 | – | 0 |
| UTEP | 1 | – | 6 | – | 0 | 1 | – | 10 | – | 0 |
| Colorado State | 0 | – | 8 | – | 0 | 0 | – | 12 | – | 0 |
$ – Conference champion; Rankings from AP Poll

The 1981 Wyoming Cowboys football team represented the University of Wyoming in the 1981 NCAA Division I-A football season. Led by first-year head coach Al Kincaid, the Cowboys compiled an 8-3 record (6-2 against conference opponents), and finished fourth in the WAC. The Cowboys played their home games at War Memorial Stadium in Laramie, Wyoming.

== Schedule ==
| Date | Opponent | Site | Result | Attendance | Source |
|---|---|---|---|---|---|
| September 5 | Cal State Fullerton* | War Memorial Stadium; Laramie, WY | W 38–13 | 17,972 | |
| September 12 | at No. 3 Oklahoma* | Oklahoma Memorial Stadium; Norman, OK | L 20–37 | 75,920 | |
| September 19 | at Air Force | Falcon Stadium; Colorado Springs, CO | W 17–10 | 28,200 | |
| October 3 | UNLV* | War Memorial Stadium; Laramie, WY | W 45–21 | 23,793 | |
| October 10 | Hawaii | War Memorial Stadium; Laramie, WY (rivalry) | L 9–14 | 19,931 | |
| October 17 | UTEP | War Memorial Stadium; Laramie, WY | W 63–12 | 7,982 | |
| October 24 | No. 13 BYU | War Memorial Stadium; Laramie, WY | W 33–20 | 22,745 | |
| October 31 | Colorado State | War Memorial Stadium; Laramie, WY (rivalry) | W 55–21 | 23,327 | |
| November 7 | at San Diego State | Jack Murphy Stadium; San Diego, CA | W 24–13 | 30,361 | |
| November 14 | at Utah | Robert Rice Stadium; Salt Lake City, UT | L 27–30 | 28,206 | |
| November 21 | at New Mexico | University Stadium; Albuquerque, NM | W 13–12 | 13,868 | |
*Non-conference game; Rankings from AP Poll released prior to the game

== Roster ==
1981 Wyoming Cowboys football team roster
Players
Coaches
Offense

| Pos. | # | Name | Class |
|---|---|---|---|
| QB | | Phil Davis |
| QB | 6 | Jay Novacek | Fr |

Defense

| Pos. | # | Name | Class |
|---|---|---|---|
| LB | 80 | Jim Eliopulos | Sr |
| S | 5 | Chuck Pagano | Sr |

Special teams

| Pos. | # | Name | Class |
|---|---|---|---|
| P | 18 | Rick Donnelly | So |
| K | | Steve Tobin |

Head coach

- Al Kincaid

Coordinators/assistant coaches

Legend

- (C) Team captain
- (S) Suspended
- (I) Ineligible
- Injured
- Redshirt
