= Bethlehem-Center School District =

School district in Pennsylvania, US

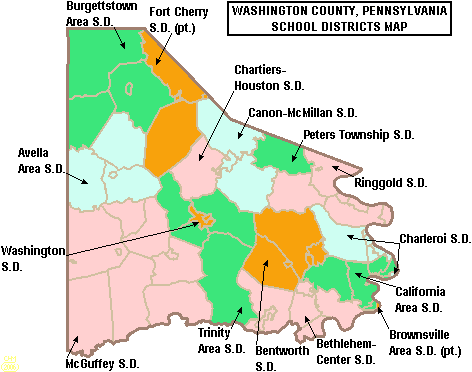

Address
- 194 Crawford Road Fredericktown, Washington County, Pennsylvania, 15333; United States
- Coordinates: 40.02234°N 80.02944°W

District information
- Type: Public school district
- Grades: K-12

Students and staff
- District mascot: Bulldogs
- Colors: Blue and gold

Other information
- Website: www.bcasd.net

The Bethlehem-Center School District is a small, rural, public school district located in the unincorporated Village of Fredericktown, Pennsylvania. It is one of fourteen school districts in Washington County, Pennsylvania. It encompasses approximately 55 square miles (140 km^{2}) serving the Boroughs of Beallsville, Centerville, Deemston, Marianna, East Bethlehem Township, and West Bethlehem Township. The district operates three schools. According to 2000 federal census data, it serves a resident population of 9,292. In 2009 the district residents' per capita income was $15,236, while the median family income was $37,302.

== Schools ==
- Bethlehem-Center Jr./Sr. High School (7th–12th)
- Bethlehem-Center Elementary School (K–6th)

== Extracurriculars ==
The district offers a variety of clubs, activities and sports. The district offers students many sports, including boys' varsity football, boys' varsity basketball, baseball, boys JV football, girls varsity basketball, softball, boys' middle school football, boys' middle school basketball, middle school softball, girls' varsity volleyball, varsity wrestling, track, boys' varsity soccer, middle school wrestling, girls' varsity soccer, golf, girls' middle school basketball and Girls Wrestling.
