= 1979 UTEP Miners football team =

American college football season

1979 UTEP Miners football
- Conference: Western Athletic Conference
- Record: 2–9 (0–7 WAC)
- Head coach: Bill Michael (3rd season)
- Home stadium: Sun Bowl

1979 Western Athletic Conference football standings
	Conf.					Overall
Team	W		L		T	W		L		T
No. 13 BYU $	7	–	0	–	0	11	–	1	–	0
Utah	5	–	2	–	0	6	–	6	–	0
San Diego State	4	–	2	–	0	8	–	3	–	0
Hawaii	3	–	3	–	0	6	–	5	–	0
New Mexico	3	–	4	–	0	6	–	6	–	0
Colorado State	3	–	4	–	0	4	–	7	–	1
Wyoming	2	–	5	–	0	4	–	8	–	0
UTEP	0	–	7	–	0	2	–	9	–	0
$ – Conference champion; Rankings from AP Poll

The 1979 UTEP Miners football team was an American football team that represented the University of Texas at El Paso in the Western Athletic Conference during the 1979 NCAA Division I-A football season. In their third year under head coach Bill Michael, the team compiled a 1–11 record.

== Schedule ==
Date	Opponent	Site	Result	Attendance	Source
September 1	at North Texas State*	Fouts Field; Denton, TX	L 0–35	17,500	
September 8	Pacific (CA)*	Sun Bowl; El Paso, TX	W 31–7	23,400	
September 15	New Mexico State*	Sun Bowl; El Paso, TX (rivalry)	L 13–14	30,132	
September 22	UNLV*	Sun Bowl; El Paso, TX	W 17–15	27,400	
September 29	at BYU	Cougar Stadium; Provo, UT	L 7–31	34,724	
October 6	at Wyoming	War Memorial Stadium; Laramie, WY	L 3–23	17,508	
October 13	Colorado State	Sun Bowl; El Paso, TX	L 3–17	27,100	
October 20	at New Mexico	University Stadium; Albuquerque, NM	L 0–20	19,612	
October 27	Hawaii^{†}	Sun Bowl; El Paso, TX	L 12–27	26,300	
November 10	Utah	Sun Bowl; El Paso, TX	L 0–35	25,016	
November 17	at San Diego State	San Diego Stadium; San Diego, CA	L 20–42	37,110	
*Non-conference game; ^{†}Homecoming
