= Chris Combs (tight end) =

American football player (born 1958)

No. 80, 89
- Position: Tight end

Personal information
- Born: March 17, 1958 (age 68); San Diego, California, U.S.
- Listed height: 6 ft 4 in (1.93 m)
- Listed weight: 238 lb (108 kg)

Career information
- High school: Sweetwater (National City, California)
- College: New Mexico (1976–1979)
- NFL draft: 1980: 4th round, 106th overall pick

Career history
- Houston Oilers (1980)*; St. Louis Cardinals (1980–1981); New York Giants (1982)*; Boston/New Orleans Breakers (1983–1984)
- * Offseason or practice squad member only

Career NFL statistics
- Receptions: 7
- Receiving yards: 106
- Touchdowns: 1
- Stats at Pro Football Reference

Christopher Allen Combs (born March 17, 1958) is an American former professional football player who was a tight end in the National Football League (NFL) for two seasons. He played college football for the New Mexico Lobos and was selected by the Houston Oilers in the fourth round of the 1980 NFL draft.

== College career ==
Combs played at the University of New Mexico for four seasons, from 1976 to 1979. In his junior season, Combs caught 21 passes, tied for the most among Lobos receivers that year. Combs caught 54 passes for 860 yards and 11 touchdowns over the course of his collegiate career.

=== Statistics ===
Year	Team	GP	Receiving			
Year	Team	GP	Rec	Yds	Avg	TD
1976	New Mexico	11	7	91	13.0	0
1977	New Mexico	12	15	284	18.9	6
1978	New Mexico	12	21	322	15.3	1
1979	New Mexico	12	11	163	14.8	4
Career		47	54	860	15.9	11

== Professional career ==
=== St. Louis Cardinals ===
Combs was selected 106th overall in the fourth round by the Houston Oilers in the 1980 NFL draft, but did not play for the team. He was claimed by the St. Louis Cardinals on August 29, 1980, and made the final roster in part because the team did not have a veteran tight end. Combs played all 16 games in 1980, catching two passes, one of which was a 38-yard touchdown against the Atlanta Falcons.

In the 1981 season, Combs again played all 16 games for the Cardinals, catching five passes for 54 yards.

=== New York Giants ===
In 1982, Combs signed with the New York Giants, but was released during training camp.

=== Boston/New Orleans Breakers ===
Combs joined the Boston Breakers for the United States Football League’s inaugural 1983 season. He played in 11 games, and caught one pass for 11 yards.

Combs remained with the Breakers after the team moved to New Orleans. In the 1984 season, Combs played in six games for the Breakers, but did not register a statistic.

== NFL career statistics ==
Year	Team	Games		Receiving				
Year	Team	GP	GS	Rec	Yds	Avg	Lng	TD
1980	St. Louis Cardinals	16	0	2	52	26.0	38	1
1981	St. Louis Cardinals	16	2	5	54	10.8	13	0
Career		32	2	7	106	15.1	38	1
