= 1981 Colorado State Rams football team =

American college football season

1981 Colorado State Rams football
- Conference: Western Athletic Conference
- Record: 0–12 (0–8 WAC)
- Head coach: Sark Arslanian (9th season; first 6 games); Chester Caddas (interim; final 6 games)
- Offensive coordinator: Al Sandahl (2nd season)
- Defensive coordinator: Chester Caddas (3rd season)
- Home stadium: Hughes Stadium

1981 Western Athletic Conference football standings
	Conf.					Overall
Team	W		L		T	W		L		T
No. 13 BYU $	7	–	1	–	0	11	–	2	–	0
Hawaii	5	–	1	–	0	9	–	2	–	0
Utah	4	–	1	–	1	8	–	2	–	1
Wyoming	6	–	2	–	0	8	–	3	–	0
New Mexico	3	–	4	–	1	4	–	7	–	1
Air Force	2	–	3	–	0	4	–	7	–	0
San Diego State	3	–	5	–	0	6	–	5	–	0
UTEP	1	–	6	–	0	1	–	10	–	0
Colorado State	0	–	8	–	0	0	–	12	–	0
$ – Conference champion; Rankings from AP Poll

The 1981 Colorado State Rams football team was an American football team that represented Colorado State University in the Western Athletic Conference (WAC) during the 1981 NCAA Division I-A football season. The team compiled a 0–12 record (0–8 against WAC opponents), becoming the first team to ever go 0–12 in a season; only the 2003 Army team has eclipsed them, as they went 0–13.

Head coach Sark Arslanian was fired after the Rams opened the season with a 0–6 record, ending his nine-year tenure with a 46–46–4 record. Defensive coordinator Chester Caddas was named as the team's interim head coach and led the team to an 0–6 record, finishing the season winless. Caddas was replaced by Texas defensive coordinator Leon Fuller after the 1981 season.

== Schedule ==
Date	Opponent	Site	Result	Attendance	Source
September 12	San Diego State	Hughes Stadium; Fort Collins, CO	L 14–30	25,257–25,287	
September 19	at Tennessee*	Neyland Stadium; Knoxville, TN	L 0–42	93,972	
September 26	at West Virginia*	Mountaineer Field; Morgantown, WV	L 3–49	48,716	
October 3	at Air Force	Falcon Stadium; Colorado Springs, CO (rivalry)	L 14–28	20,300	
October 10	No. 19 Mississippi State*^{†}	Hughes Stadium; Fort Collins, CO	L 27–37	24,761	
October 17	Utah	Hughes Stadium; Fort Collins, CO	L 13–24	15,933	
October 24	at UTEP	Sun Bowl; El Paso, TX	L 29–35	11,300	
October 31	at Wyoming	War Memorial Stadium; Laramie, WY (rivalry)	L 21–55	23,327	
November 7	BYU	Hughes Stadium; Fort Collins, CO	L 14–63	17,851	
November 14	New Mexico	Hughes Stadium; Fort Collins, CO	L 16–28	10,149	
November 21	at No. 20 Arizona State*	Sun Devil Stadium; Tempe, AZ	L 7–52	61,00	
November 28	at Hawaii	Aloha Stadium; Halawa, HI	L 6–59	32,955	
*Non-conference game; ^{†}Homecoming; Rankings from AP Poll released prior to the game
