= 1981 Pacific Tigers football team =

American college football season

1981 Pacific Tigers football
- Conference: Pacific Coast Athletic Association
- Record: 5–6 (2–3 PCAA)
- Head coach: Bob Toledo (3rd season)
- Home stadium: Pacific Memorial Stadium

1981 Pacific Coast Athletic Association football standings
| | Conf. | | | | | Overall |
| Team | W | | L | | T | W | | L | | T |
|---|---|---|---|---|---|---|---|---|---|---|
| San Jose State $ | 5 | – | 0 | – | 0 | 9 | – | 3 | – | 0 |
| Utah State | 4 | – | 1 | – | 1 | 5 | – | 5 | – | 1 |
| Fresno State | 2 | – | 3 | – | 0 | 5 | – | 6 | – | 0 |
| Pacific (CA) | 2 | – | 3 | – | 0 | 5 | – | 6 | – | 0 |
| Cal State Fullerton | 1 | – | 4 | – | 0 | 3 | – | 8 | – | 0 |
| Long Beach State | 1 | – | 4 | – | 0 | 2 | – | 8 | – | 0 |
$ – Conference champion

The 1981 Pacific Tigers football team represented the University of the Pacific (UOP) in the 1981 NCAA Division I-A football season as a member of the Pacific Coast Athletic Association. (Note: The Big West Conference was known as the Pacific Coast Athletic Association from its founding in 1969 through 1987.)

The team was led by head coach Bob Toledo, in his third year, and played their home games at Pacific Memorial Stadium (Note: Amos Alonzo Stagg Memorial Stadium was known as Pacific Memorial Stadium from its opening in 1950 through 1987.) in Stockton, California. They finished the season with a record of five wins and six losses (5–6, 2–3 PCAA). The Tigers were outscored by their opponents 170–253 over the season.

== Schedule ==
| Date | Opponent | Site | Result | Attendance | Source |
|---|---|---|---|---|---|
| September 5 | Central Michigan* | Pacific Memorial Stadium; Stockton, CA | W 10–3 | | |
| September 12 | at No. 17 Washington* | Husky Stadium; Seattle, WA | L 14–34 | 45,134 | |
| September 19 | at Oregon* | Autzen Stadium; Eugene, OR | L 0–34 | 24,519 | |
| October 3 | at Washington State* | Martin Stadium; Pullman, WA | L 0–31 | 17,923 | |
| October 10 | Utah State | Pacific Memorial Stadium; Stockton, CA | L 14–17 | 14,000 | |
| October 17 | at Long Beach State | Anaheim Stadium; Anaheim, CA | W 17–10 | 8,646 | |
| October 24 | Fresno State | Pacific Memorial Stadium; Stockton, CA | L 27–30 | 13,500 | |
| October 31 | Cal State Fullerton^{†} | Pacific Memorial Stadium; Stockton, CA | W 17–16 | 15,003 | |
| November 7 | at South Carolina* | Williams–Brice Stadium; Columbia, SC | W 23–21 | 51,879 | |
| November 14 | at San Jose State | Spartan Stadium; San Jose, CA (Victory Bell) | L 25–40 | 15,060 | |
| November 21 | at Hawaii* | Aloha Stadium; Halawa, HI | W 23–17 | 38,368 | |
*Non-conference game; ^{†}Homecoming; Rankings from AP Poll released prior to the game

== Team players in the NFL ==
The following UOP players were selected in the 1982 NFL draft.

| Player | Position | Round | Overall | NFL team |
| Mike Merriweather | Linebacker | 3 | 70 | Pittsburgh Steelers |
| Kirk Harmon | Linebacker | 8 | 206 | Minnesota Vikings |
