= 1981 Utah State Aggies football team =

American college football season

1981 Utah State Aggies football
- Conference: Pacific Coast Athletic Association
- Record: 5–5–1 (4–1 PCAA)
- Head coach: Bruce Snyder (6th season)
- Home stadium: Romney Stadium

1981 Pacific Coast Athletic Association football standings
| | Conf. | | | | | Overall |
| Team | W | | L | | T | W | | L | | T |
|---|---|---|---|---|---|---|---|---|---|---|
| San Jose State $ | 5 | – | 0 | – | 0 | 9 | – | 3 | – | 0 |
| Utah State | 4 | – | 1 | – | 1 | 5 | – | 5 | – | 1 |
| Fresno State | 2 | – | 3 | – | 0 | 5 | – | 6 | – | 0 |
| Pacific (CA) | 2 | – | 3 | – | 0 | 5 | – | 6 | – | 0 |
| Cal State Fullerton | 1 | – | 4 | – | 0 | 3 | – | 8 | – | 0 |
| Long Beach State | 1 | – | 4 | – | 0 | 2 | – | 8 | – | 0 |
$ – Conference champion

The 1981 Utah State Aggies football team represented Utah State University during the 1981 NCAA Division I-A football season as a member of the Pacific Coast Athletic Association (PCAA). The Aggies were led by sixth-year head coach Bruce Snyder and played their home games at Romney Stadium in Logan, Utah. They finished the season with a record of five wins, five losses, and one tie (5–5–1, 4–1 PCAA).

== Schedule ==
| Date | Opponent | Site | Result | Attendance | Source |
|---|---|---|---|---|---|
| September 5 | at Utah* | Robert Rice Stadium; Salt Lake City, UT (Battle of the Brothers, Beehive Boot) | L 0–10 | 29,010 | |
| September 12 | Cal State Fullerton | Romney Stadium; Logan, UT | W 14–9 | 12,472 | |
| September 19 | Weber State* | Romney Stadium; Logan, UT | W 31–18 | 17,132 | |
| September 26 | at Houston* | Houston Astrodome; Houston, TX | L 7–35 | 27,462 | |
| October 2 | at No. 10 BYU* | Cougar Stadium; Provo, UT (rivalry, Beehive Boot) | L 26–32 | 41,129 | |
| October 10 | at Pacific (CA) | Pacific Memorial Stadium; Stockton, CA | W 17–14 | 14,000 | |
| October 17 | at Texas Christian* | Amon G. Carter Stadium; Fort Worth, TX | T 13–13 | 15,357 | |
| October 24 | San Jose State | Romney Stadium; Logan, UT | L 24–27 | 16,071 | |
| October 31 | Fresno State | Romney Stadium; Logan, UT | W 20–0 | 13,086 | |
| November 7 | at Long Beach State | Anaheim Stadium; Anaheim, CA | W 28–2 | 3,800 | |
| November 14 | at Idaho State* | ASISU Minidome; Pocatello, ID | L 24–50 | 12,008 | |
*Non-conference game; Rankings from AP Poll released prior to the game
