= 1981 BYU Cougars football team =

American college football season

1981 BYU Cougars football

WAC champion Holiday Bowl champion

Holiday Bowl, W 38–36 vs. Washington State
- Conference: Western Athletic Conference

Ranking
- Coaches: No. 11
- AP: No. 13
- Record: 11–2 (7–1 WAC)
- Head coach: LaVell Edwards (10th season)
- Offensive coordinator: Roger French (1st season)
- Offensive scheme: West Coast
- Defensive coordinator: Fred Whittingham (3rd season)
- Base defense: 4–3
- Home stadium: Cougar Stadium

1981 Western Athletic Conference football standings
	Conf.					Overall
Team	W		L		T	W		L		T
No. 13 BYU $	7	–	1	–	0	11	–	2	–	0
Hawaii	5	–	1	–	0	9	–	2	–	0
Utah	4	–	1	–	1	8	–	2	–	1
Wyoming	6	–	2	–	0	8	–	3	–	0
New Mexico	3	–	4	–	1	4	–	7	–	1
Air Force	2	–	3	–	0	4	–	7	–	0
San Diego State	3	–	5	–	0	6	–	5	–	0
UTEP	1	–	6	–	0	1	–	10	–	0
Colorado State	0	–	8	–	0	0	–	12	–	0
$ – Conference champion; Rankings from AP Poll

The 1981 BYU Cougars football team represented Brigham Young University (BYU) in the 1981 NCAA Division I-A football season. The Cougars were led by 10th-year head coach LaVell Edwards and played their home games at Cougar Stadium in Provo, Utah. The team competed as a member of the Western Athletic Conference, winning their sixth consecutive conference title with a conference record of 7–1. BYU was invited to the 1981 Holiday Bowl, where they defeated Washington State. They were ranked 13th in the final AP Poll with an overall record of 11–2.

== Schedule ==
Date	Opponent	Rank	Site	Result	Attendance	Source
September 5	at Long Beach State*	No. 16	Anaheim Stadium; Anaheim, CA	W 31–8	20,953	
September 12	Air Force	No. 15	Cougar Stadium; Provo, UT	W 45–21	38,712	
September 19	at UTEP	No. 13	Sun Bowl; El Paso, TX	W 65–8	19,400	
September 26	at Colorado*	No. 11	Folsom Field; Boulder, CO	W 41–20	43,259	
October 2	Utah State*	No. 10	Cougar Stadium; Provo, UT (rivalry)	W 32–26	41,129	
October 10	UNLV*	No. 8	Cougar Stadium; Provo, UT	L 41–45	39,852	
October 17	at San Diego State	No. 17	Jack Murphy Stadium; San Diego, CA	W 27–7	41,727	
October 24	at Wyoming	No. 13	War Memorial Stadium; Laramie, WY	L 20–33	22,745	
October 31	New Mexico		Cougar Stadium; Provo, UT	W 31–7	36,343	
November 7	at Colorado State		Hughes Stadium; Fort Collins, CO	W 63–14	17,851	
November 14	at No. 19 Hawaii		Aloha Stadium; Halawa, HI	W 13–3	45,355	
November 21	Utah	No. 18	Cougar Stadium; Provo, UT (Holy War)	W 56–28	47,163	
December 18	vs. No. 20 Washington State*	No. 14	Jack Murphy Stadium; San Diego, CA (Holiday Bowl)	W 38–36	52,419	
*Non-conference game; Rankings from AP Poll released prior to the game

== Game summaries ==
=== At Long Beach State ===
#16 BYU Cougars (0–0) at Long Beach State 49ers (0–0)

Quarter	1	2	3	4	Total
BYU	7	10	14	0	31
Long Beach St	0	0	0	8	8

at Anaheim Stadium, Anaheim, California

- Date: September 5, 1981
- Game weather: Clear, 87 °F (31 °C)
- Game attendance: 20,953
- TV: ESPN
- Box Score

External videos
- Full game
- BYU highlights

Team	Category	Player	Statistics
BYU	Passing	Jim McMahon	28/45, 403 Yds, 2 INT
BYU	Rushing	Scott Pettis	5 Rush, 37 Yds, TD
BYU	Receiving	Dan Plater	8 Rec, 99 Yds
Long Beach St	Passing	Angelo Gasca	11/24, 73 Yds, 3 INT
Long Beach St	Rushing	Tim Gross	14 Rush, 40 Yds
Long Beach St	Receiving	Louis Leidelmeyer	2 Rec, 43 Yds

Scoring summary

Quarter	Time	Drive			Team	Scoring information	Score	
Quarter	Time	Plays	Yards	TOP	Team	Scoring information	BYU	LBS
1					BYU	Scott Pettis 10-yard touchdown run, Kurt Gunther kick good	7	0
2					BYU	Interception returned 12 yards for touchdown by Todd Shell, Kurt Gunther kick good	14	0
2					BYU	32-yard field goal by Kurt Gunther	17	0
3					BYU	Waymon Hamilton 2-yard touchdown run, Kurt Gunther kick good	24	0
3					BYU	Blocked punt recovered in end zone for touchdown by Tom Holmoe, Kurt Gunther kick good	31	0
4					Long Beach St	Darryl Stokes 11-yard touchdown reception from Doug Disney, 2-point run good	31	8
"TOP" = time of possession. For other American football terms, see Glossary of American football.							31	8

=== Air Force ===
Team	1	2	3	4	Total
Air Force	0	7	7	7	21
• BYU	10	14	7	14	45

- Date: September 12
- Location: Cougar Stadium, Provo, Utah
- Game attendance: 38,712

Scoring summary
Q1	BYU	Hudson 10 yard pass from McMahon (Gunther kick)	BYU 7–0
Q1	BYU	Gunther 32 yard field goal	BYU 10–0
Q2	BYU	Hamilton 1 yard run (Gunther kick)	BYU 17–0
Q2	AFA	Kirby 75 yard punt return (Pavlich kick)	BYU 17–7
Q2	BYU	Kozlowski 12 yard pass from McMahon (Gunther kick)	BYU 24–7
Q3	BYU	Hamilton 4 yard pass from McMahon (Gunther kick)	BYU 31–7
Q3	AFA	Sundquist 1 yard run (Pavlich kick)	BYU 31–14
Q4	AFA	James 13 yard run (Pavlich kick)	BYU 31–21
Q4	BYU	Hamilton 12 yard pass from McMahon (Gunther kick)	BYU 38–21
Q4	BYU	Sikahema 8 yard run (Gunther kick)	BYU 45–21

=== At Colorado ===
Team	1	2	3	4	Total
• BYU	14	3	14	10	41
Colorado	0	0	6	14	20

- Date: September 26
- Location: Folsom Field • Boulder, Colorado
- Game attendance: 43,259

Scoring summary
1	BYU	Plater 44-yard pass from McMahon (Gunther kick)	BYU 7-0
1	BYU	Pettis 7-yard pass from McMahon (Gunther kick)	BYU 14-0
2	BYU	Gunther 40-yard field goal	BYU 17-0
3	BYU	Kozlowski 3-yard pass from McMahon (Gunther kick)	BYU 24-0
3	COL	James 33-yard pass from Essington (pass failed)	BYU 24-6
3	BYU	Hudson 11-yard pass from Young (Gunther kick)	BYU 31-6
4	COL	Rouson 7-yard run (pass failed)	BYU 31-12
4	BYU	Plater 22-yard pass from Young (Gunther kick)	BYU 38-12
4	BYU	Gunther 32-yard field goal	BYU 41-12
4	COL	Beebe 1-yard pass from Essington (Johnson pass from Essington)	BYU 41-20

=== Utah State ===
Team	1	2	3	4	Total
Utah St	0	7	7	12	26
• BYU	0	7	6	19	32

- Date: October 2
- Location: Cougar Stadium • Provo, Utah

Scoring summary
2	USU	Jones 8-yard pass from Canales (Money kick)	Utah St 7-0
2	BYU	Pettis 6-yard run (Gunther kick)	Tie 7-7
3	USU	McPherson 4-yard pass from Canales (Money kick)	Utah St 14-7
3	BYU	Hamilton 1-yard run (kick failed)	Utah St 14-13
4	USU	McPherson 5-yard pass from Canales (kick failed)	Utah St 20-13
4	BYU	Collie 8-yard pass from Young (Gunther kick)	Tie 20-20
4	USU	Turner 6-yard run (kick failed)	Utah St 26-20
4	BYU	Hamilton 42-yard run (kick failed)	Tie 26-26
4	BYU	Shell 19-yard interception return (kick failed)	BYU 32-26

=== At Wyoming ===
#13 BYU Cougars (6–1) at Wyoming Cowboys (4–2)

Quarter	1	2	3	4	Total
BYU	14	0	0	6	20
Wyoming	0	14	7	12	33

at War Memorial Stadium, Laramie, Wyoming

- Date: October 24, 1981
- Game weather: Snow, 32 °F (0 °C)
- Game attendance: 22,745
- Box Score

Game information

First quarter

- BYU – Waymon Hamilton 2-yard run (Kurt Gunther kick). BYU 7–0.
- BYU – Scott Collie 63-yard pass from Jim McMahon (Lee Johnson kick). BYU 14–0.

Second quarter

- WYO – Phil Davis 30-yard run (kick failed). BYU 14–6.
- WYO – Charles Moore 25-yard run (run good). Tie 14–14.

Third quarter

- WYO – Phil Davis 32-yard run (Steve Tobin kick). Wyoming 21–14.

Fourth quarter

- WYO – James Williams 81-yard pass from Phil Davis (two-point conversion failed). Wyoming 27–14.
- WYO – Phil Davis 28-yard run (two-point conversion failed). Wyoming 33–14.
- BYU – David Mills 5-yard pass from Jim McMahon (kick failed). Wyoming 33–20.

Top passers

- BYU – Jim McMahon – 29/47, 393 yards, 2 TD, INT
- WYO – Phil Davis – 5/11, 124 yards, TD

Top rushers

- BYU – Scott Pettis – 9 rushes, 58 yards
- WYO – Phil Davis – 16 rushes, 140 yards, 3 TD

Top receivers

- BYU – Scott Collie – 5 receptions, 123 yards, TD
- WYO – James Williams – 4 receptions, 114 yards, TD

I'd rather lose and live in Provo than win and live in Wyoming.

— LaVell Edwards, following the loss

=== At Hawaii ===
Team	1	2	3	4	Total
• BYU	0	6	7	0	13
Hawaii	0	0	0	3	3

- Date: November 16
- Location: Aloha Stadium • Honolulu, Hawaii

Scoring summary
2	BYU	Gunther 19-yard field goal	BYU 3-0
2	BYU	Gunther 45-yard field goal	BYU 6-0
3	BYU	Balholm recovered fumble in end zone (Gunther kick)	BYU 13-0
4	HAW	Larsen 40-yard field goal	BYU 13-3

=== Utah ===
Utah at #18 BYU

Team	1	2	3	4	Total
Utah	10	11	7	0	28
• BYU	14	21	14	7	56

- Date: Saturday, November 21
- Location: Cougar Stadium, Provo, Utah
- Game attendance: 47,163
- Source: Eugene Register-Guard

Scoring summary
1	UTAH	Rodgers 87-yard run (Alvarez kick)	Utah 7-0
1	BYU	Pettis 6-yard run (Gunther kick)	Tied 7-7
1	UTAH	Alvarez 43-yard field goal	Utah 10-7
1	BYU	Hudson 8-yard pass from McMahon (Gunther kick)	BYU 14-10
2	UTAH	Alvarez 27-yard field goal	BYU 14-13
2	BYU	Hamilton 1-yard run (Gunther kick)	BYU 21-13
2	BYU	Mills 6-yard pass from McMahon (Gunther kick)	BYU 28-13
2	BYU	McKee 18-yard interception return (Gunther kick)	BYU 35-13
2	UTAH	Rodgers 1-yard run (Ferguson to Rodgers pass)	BYU 35-21
3	UTAH	Rodgers 8-yard run (Alvarez kick)	BYU 35-28
3	BYU	Hamilton 1-yard run (Gunther kick)	BYU 42-28
3	BYU	Plater 27-yard pass from McMahon (Gunther kick)	BYU 49-28
4	BYU	Hudson 37-yard pass from McMahon (Gunther kick)	BYU 56-28

Jim McMahon passes for 565 yards and becomes the NCAA's career leader in the category.

=== Holiday Bowl (vs Washington State) ===
1981 Holiday Bowl

== Personnel ==
1981 BYU Cougars football team roster
Players
Coaches
Offense

Pos.	#	Name	Class
G, C	57	Robert Anae	Fr
QB	6	Robbie Bosco	Fr
RB	2	Bruce Hansen	So
TE	95	Gordon Hudson	So
WR	7	Glen Kozlowski	RFr
QB	9	Jim McMahon	RSr
C	50	Bart Oates	Jr
RB	23	Vai Sikahema	So
QB	8	Steve Young	So

Defense

Pos.	#	Name	Class
DT	78	Chuck Ehin	Jr
DE	92	Jim Herrmann	Fr
DB	46	Tom Holmoe	Jr
DE	77	Mike Morgan	Jr
LB	47	Todd Shell	So
LB	59	Kyle Whittingham	Sr

Special teams

Pos.	#	Name	Class
K	2	Kurt Gunther	Jr
P	10	Lee Johnson	Fr

Head coach

- LaVell Edwards

Coordinators/assistant coaches

- Jim Paronto
  (Graduate assistant)

Legend

- (C) Team captain
- (S) Suspended
- (I) Ineligible
- Injured
- Redshirt

Roster

== Awards and honors ==
- Jim McMahon – Sammy Baugh Trophy, Davey O'Brien Award

== Team players in the NFL ==
The following were selected in the 1982 NFL draft.

Player	Position	Round	Overall	NFL team
Jim McMahon	Quarterback	1	5	Chicago Bears
Dan Plater	Wide receiver	4	106	Denver Broncos
