= 1979 New Mexico Lobos football team =

American college football season

1979 New Mexico Lobos football
- Conference: Western Athletic Conference
- Record: 6–6 (3–4 WAC)
- Head coach: Bill Mondt (6th season)
- Home stadium: University Stadium

1979 Western Athletic Conference football standings
	Conf.					Overall
Team	W		L		T	W		L		T
No. 13 BYU $	7	–	0	–	0	11	–	1	–	0
Utah	5	–	2	–	0	6	–	6	–	0
San Diego State	4	–	2	–	0	8	–	3	–	0
Hawaii	3	–	3	–	0	6	–	5	–	0
New Mexico	3	–	4	–	0	6	–	6	–	0
Colorado State	3	–	4	–	0	4	–	7	–	1
Wyoming	2	–	5	–	0	4	–	8	–	0
UTEP	0	–	7	–	0	2	–	9	–	0
$ – Conference champion; Rankings from AP Poll

The 1979 New Mexico Lobos football team was an American football team that represented the University of New Mexico in the Western Athletic Conference (WAC) during the 1979 NCAA Division I-A football season. In their sixth and final season under head coach Bill Mondt, the Lobos compiled a 6–6 record (3–4 against WAC opponents) and were outscored by a total of 229 to 211.

The team's statistical leaders included Casey Miller with 555 passing yards, Jimmy Sayers with 696 rushing yards, Derwin Williams with 250 receiving yards, and kicker Alan Moore with 49 points scored.

== Schedule ==
Date	Opponent	Site	Result	Attendance	Source
September 1	Louisiana Tech*	University Stadium; Albuquerque, NM	W 34–0	27,380	
September 8	Oregon State*	University Stadium; Albuquerque, NM	W 35–16	27,525	
September 15	at Texas Tech*	Jones Stadium; Lubbock, TX	L 7–17	42,109	
September 22	at Hawaii	Aloha Stadium; Halawa, HI	L 3–20	40,079	
September 29	at New Mexico State*	Aggie Memorial Stadium; Las Cruces, NM (rivalry)	W 30–16	26,271	
October 6	San Diego State^{†}	University Stadium; Albuquerque, NM	L 7–35	21,205	
October 13	at UNLV*	Las Vegas Silver Bowl; Whitney, NV	L 20–28	22,201	
October 20	UTEP	University Stadium; Albuquerque, NM	W 20–0	19,612	
October 27	at No. 11 BYU	Cougar Stadium; Provo, UT	L 7–59	33,921	
November 3	Utah	University Stadium; Albuquerque, NM	L 7–26	19,093	
November 10	at Colorado State	Hughes Stadium; Fort Collins, CO	W 24–9	16,273	
November 24	Wyoming	University Stadium; Albuquerque, NM	W 17–3	4,700	
*Non-conference game; ^{†}Homecoming; Rankings from AP Poll released prior to the game

== Roster ==
1979 New Mexico Lobos football team roster
Players
Coaches
Offense

Pos.	#	Name	Class
TE	92	Walt Arnold	Sr
QB	10	Jim Cappon	Jr
TE	89	Chris Combs	Sr
OT	74	Frank Giddens	Jr
OT	73	Shawn Hollingsworth	Fr
QB	9	C. J. Jones	Sr
QB	15	Brad Wright	Jr

Defense

Pos.	#	Name	Class
LB	53	Charles Baker	Sr
CB	6	Bill Turner	Sr

Special teams

Pos.	#	Name	Class
K	25	Allen Moore	Sr

Head coach

- Bill Mondt

Coordinators/assistant coaches

Legend

- (C) Team captain
- (S) Suspended
- (I) Ineligible
- Injured
- Redshirt
