= 1981 UTEP Miners football team =

American college football season

1981 UTEP Miners football
- Conference: Western Athletic Conference
- Record: 1–10 (1–6 WAC)
- Head coach: Bill Michael (5th season season; first 2 games); Billy Alton (interim; final 9 games)
- Home stadium: Sun Bowl

1981 Western Athletic Conference football standings
	Conf.					Overall
Team	W		L		T	W		L		T
No. 13 BYU $	7	–	1	–	0	11	–	2	–	0
Hawaii	5	–	1	–	0	9	–	2	–	0
Utah	4	–	1	–	1	8	–	2	–	1
Wyoming	6	–	2	–	0	8	–	3	–	0
New Mexico	3	–	4	–	1	4	–	7	–	1
Air Force	2	–	3	–	0	4	–	7	–	0
San Diego State	3	–	5	–	0	6	–	5	–	0
UTEP	1	–	6	–	0	1	–	10	–	0
Colorado State	0	–	8	–	0	0	–	12	–	0
$ – Conference champion; Rankings from AP Poll

The 1981 UTEP Miners football team was an American football team that represented the University of Texas at El Paso in the Western Athletic Conference during the 1981 NCAA Division I-A football season. After an 0–2 start to the season, fifth-year head coach Bill Michael was fired and replaced with assistant Billy Alton. The Miners then ended the season with one win and eight more losses and finished with an 1–10 record.

== Schedule ==
Date	Opponent	Site	Result	Attendance	Source
September 5	New Mexico State*	Sun Bowl; El Paso, TX (rivalry)	L 7–14	25,600	
September 12	Texas A&I*	Sun Bowl; El Paso, TX	L 15–37	17,600	
September 19	No. 13 BYU	Sun Bowl; El Paso, TX	L 8–65	19,400	
October 2	at Utah	Robert Rice Stadium; Salt Lake City, UT	L 10–38	26,851	
October 10	at New Mexico	University Stadium; Albuquerque, NM	L 3–26	18,367	
October 17	at Wyoming	War Memorial Stadium; Laramie, WY	L 12–63	7,982	
October 24	Colorado State	Sun Bowl; El Paso, TX	W 35–29	11,200	
October 31	at Arizona*	Arizona Stadium; Tucson, AZ	L 15–48	35,642	
November 7	Hawaii^{†}	Sun Bowl; El Paso, TX	L 7–35	9,600	
November 21	at San Diego State	Jack Murphy Stadium; San Diego, CA	L 14–59	20,824	
November 28	UNLV*	Sun Bowl; El Paso, TX	L 20–27	2,312	
*Non-conference game; ^{†}Homecoming; Rankings from AP Poll released prior to the game
