= 1981 San Jose State Spartans football team =

American college football season

1981 San Jose State Spartans football
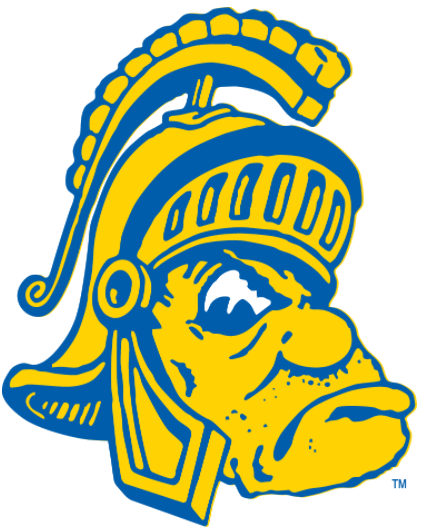

PCAA champion

California Bowl, L 25–27 vs. Toledo
- Conference: Pacific Coast Athletic Association
- Record: 9–3 (5–0 PCAA)
- Head coach: Jack Elway (3rd season)
- Offensive coordinator: Dennis Erickson (3rd season)
- Offensive scheme: Spread
- Home stadium: Spartan Stadium

1981 Pacific Coast Athletic Association football standings
| | Conf. | | | | | Overall |
| Team | W | | L | | T | W | | L | | T |
|---|---|---|---|---|---|---|---|---|---|---|
| San Jose State $ | 5 | – | 0 | – | 0 | 9 | – | 3 | – | 0 |
| Utah State | 4 | – | 1 | – | 1 | 5 | – | 5 | – | 1 |
| Fresno State | 2 | – | 3 | – | 0 | 5 | – | 6 | – | 0 |
| Pacific (CA) | 2 | – | 3 | – | 0 | 5 | – | 6 | – | 0 |
| Cal State Fullerton | 1 | – | 4 | – | 0 | 3 | – | 8 | – | 0 |
| Long Beach State | 1 | – | 4 | – | 0 | 2 | – | 8 | – | 0 |
$ – Conference champion

The 1981 San Jose State Spartans football team represented San Jose State University during the 1981 NCAA Division I-A football season as a member of the Pacific Coast Athletic Association. (Note: The Big West Conference was known as the Pacific Coast Athletic Association from its founding in 1969 through 1987.) Led by third-year head coach Jack Elway, they played home games at Spartan Stadium in San Jose, California.

The Spartans were champions of the PCAA, with a record of nine wins and three losses (9–3, 5–0 PCAA), and qualified for the initial California Bowl against the Mid-American Conference (MAC) champion Toledo Rockets. This was the second bowl appearance for the Spartans since moving up to Division I-A; they were in the Pasadena Bowl a decade earlier. The California Bowl was played at Bulldog Stadium in Fresno, and Toledo won 27–25 with a late field goal.

In early December, offensive coordinator Dennis Erickson was hired as the head coach at Idaho in the Big Sky Conference, but coached the Spartans in the bowl game.

The Spartan offense was led by quarterback Steve Clarkson, running back Gerald Willhite, and wide receiver Tim Kearse.

== Schedule ==
| Date | Opponent | Site | TV | Result | Attendance | Source |
|---|---|---|---|---|---|---|
| September 5 | UNLV* | Spartan Stadium; San Jose, CA | | L 6–16 | 17,112 | |
| September 12 | Santa Clara* | Spartan Stadium; San Jose, CA | | W 41–7 | 17,238 | |
| September 19 | at Stanford* | Stanford Stadium; Stanford, CA (rivalry) | USA | W 28–6 | 67,888 | |
| September 26 | at California* | California Memorial Stadium; Berkeley, CA | ABC | W 27–24 | 34,000 | |
| October 3 | at Fresno State | Bulldog Stadium; Fresno, CA (rivalry) | ABC | W 65–33 | 25,617 | |
| October 17 | Cal State Fullerton^{†} | Spartan Stadium; San Jose, CA | ESPN | W 45–23 | 21,238 | |
| October 24 | at Utah State | Romney Stadium; Logan, UT | | W 27–24 | 16,071 | |
| November 7 | at No. 10 Arizona State* | Sun Devil Stadium; Tempe, CA | | L 24–31 | 65,728 | |
| November 14 | Pacific (CA) | Spartan Stadium; San Jose, CA (Victory Bell) | | W 40–25 | 15,060 | |
| November 21 | at Long Beach State | Anaheim Stadium; Anaheim, CA | | W 25–22 | 6,723 | |
| November 28 | North Texas State* | Spartan Stadium; San Jose, CA | | W 28–16 | 13,091 | |
| December 19 | Toledo* | Bulldog Stadium; Fresno, CA (California Bowl) | Mizlou | L 25–27 | 15,565 | |
*Non-conference game; ^{†}Homecoming; Rankings from AP Poll released prior to the game

== Team players in the NFL ==
The following were selected in the 1982 NFL draft.

| Player | Position | Round | Overall | NFL team |
| Gerald Willhite | Running back | 1 | 21 | Denver Broncos |
| Stacey Bailey | Wide receiver | 3 | 63 | Atlanta Falcons |

The following finished their college career in 1981, were not drafted, but played in the NFL.

| Player | Position | First NFL team |
| Kenny Daniel | Defensive back | 1984 New York Giants |
| Tracy Franz | Guard | 1987 San Francisco 49ers |
