= 1981 New Mexico Lobos football team =

American college football season

1981 New Mexico Lobos football
- Conference: Western Athletic Conference
- Record: 4–7–1 (3–4–1 WAC)
- Head coach: Joe Morrison (2nd season)
- Home stadium: University Stadium

1981 Western Athletic Conference football standings
	Conf.					Overall
Team	W		L		T	W		L		T
No. 13 BYU $	7	–	1	–	0	11	–	2	–	0
Hawaii	5	–	1	–	0	9	–	2	–	0
Utah	4	–	1	–	1	8	–	2	–	1
Wyoming	6	–	2	–	0	8	–	3	–	0
New Mexico	3	–	4	–	1	4	–	7	–	1
Air Force	2	–	3	–	0	4	–	7	–	0
San Diego State	3	–	5	–	0	6	–	5	–	0
UTEP	1	–	6	–	0	1	–	10	–	0
Colorado State	0	–	8	–	0	0	–	12	–	0
$ – Conference champion; Rankings from AP Poll

The 1981 New Mexico Lobos football team was an American football team that represented the University of New Mexico in the Western Athletic Conference (WAC) during the 1981 NCAA Division I-A football season. In their second season under head coach Joe Morrison, the Lobos compiled a 4–7–1 record (3–4–1 against WAC opponents) and were outscored by a total of 231 to 225.

The team's statistical leaders included Robin Gabriel with 1,783 passing yards, Mike D. Carter with 595 rushing yards, Keith Magee with 706 receiving yards, and kicker Pete Parks with 49 points scored.

== Schedule ==
Date	Opponent	Site	Result	Attendance	Source
September 5	at Houston*	Houston Astrodome; Houston, TX	L 10–21	26,435	
September 12	at UNLV*	Las Vegas Silver Bowl; Whitney, NV	L 42–49	25,605	
September 19	at Texas Tech*	Jones Stadium; Lubbock, TX	L 21–28	42,321	
September 26	Air Force	University Stadium; Albuquerque, NM	W 27–10	24,240	
October 3	San Diego State	University Stadium; Albuquerque, NM	L 15–17	18,265	
October 10	UTEP^{†}	University Stadium; Albuquerque, NM	W 26–3	18,367	
October 17	at Hawaii	Aloha Stadium; Halawa, HI	L 13–23	46,692	
October 24	at New Mexico State*	Aggie Memorial Stadium; Las Cruces, NM (rivalry)	W 17–13	19,253	
October 31	at BYU	Cougar Stadium; Provo, UT	L 7–31	36,343	
November 7	Utah	University Stadium; Albuquerque, NM	T 7–7	14,420	
November 14	at Colorado State	Hughes Stadium; Fort Collins, CO	W 28–16	10,149	
November 21	Wyoming	University Stadium; Albuquerque, NM	L 12–13	13,868	
*Non-conference game; ^{†}Homecoming
