= 1981 Cal State Fullerton Titans football team =

American college football season

1981 Cal State Fullerton Titans football
- Conference: Pacific Coast Athletic Association
- Record: 3–8 (1–4 PCAA)
- Head coach: Gene Murphy (2nd season)
- Defensive coordinator: Bob Burt (2nd season)
- Home stadium: Titan Field

1981 Pacific Coast Athletic Association football standings
	Conf.					Overall
Team	W		L		T	W		L		T
San Jose State $	5	–	0	–	0	9	–	3	–	0
Utah State	4	–	1	–	1	5	–	5	–	1
Fresno State	2	–	3	–	0	5	–	6	–	0
Pacific (CA)	2	–	3	–	0	5	–	6	–	0
Cal State Fullerton	1	–	4	–	0	3	–	8	–	0
Long Beach State	1	–	4	–	0	2	–	8	–	0
$ – Conference champion

The 1981 Cal State Fullerton Titans football team represented California State University, Fullerton as a member of the Pacific Coast Athletic Association (PCAA) during the 1981 NCAA Division I-A football season. Led by second-year head coach Gene Murphy, Cal State Fullerton compiled an overall record of 3–8 with a mark of 1–4 in conference play, tying for fifth place in the PCAA. The Titans played home games at Titan Field on the Cal State Fullerton campus. The football team shared the stadium with the Cal State Fullerton Titans baseball from 1980 to 1982.

== Schedule ==
Date	Opponent	Site	Result	Attendance	Source
September 5	at Wyoming	War Memorial Stadium; Laramie, WY	L 13–38	17,972	
September 12	at Utah State	Romney Stadium; Logan, UT	L 9–14	12,472	
September 19	at Hawaii*	Aloha Stadium; Halawa, HI	L 12–38	45,061	
September 26	at Arizona*	Arizona Stadium; Tucson, AZ	L 16–37	36,279	
October 3	Cal Poly*	Titan Field; Fullerton, CA	W 34–10	5,125	
October 10	at Fresno State	Bulldog Stadium; Fresno, CA	W 13–10	20,348	
October 17	at San Jose State	Spartan Stadium; San Jose, CA	L 23–45	21,238	
October 24	Long Beach State^{†}	Titan Field; Fullerton, CA	L 9–10	3,800	
October 31	at Pacific (CA)	Pacific Memorial Stadium; Stockton, CA	L 16–17	15,003	
November 7	No. 3 Boise State*	Titan Field; Fullerton, CA	W 20–17	2,100	
November 21	Nevada*	Titan Field; Fullerton, CA	L 34–36	2,500	
*Non-conference game; ^{†}Homecoming; Rankings from NCAA Division I-AA Football Committee Poll released prior to the game
