= 1979 San Diego State Aztecs football team =

American college football season

1979 San Diego State Aztecs football
- Conference: Western Athletic Conference
- Record: 8–3 (4–2 WAC)
- Head coach: Claude Gilbert (7th season)
- Offensive coordinator: Ted Tollner (7th season)
- Offensive scheme: Pro-style
- Base defense: 4–3
- Home stadium: San Diego Stadium

1979 Western Athletic Conference football standings
	Conf.					Overall
Team	W		L		T	W		L		T
No. 13 BYU $	7	–	0	–	0	11	–	1	–	0
Utah	5	–	2	–	0	6	–	6	–	0
San Diego State	4	–	2	–	0	8	–	3	–	0
Hawaii	3	–	3	–	0	6	–	5	–	0
New Mexico	3	–	4	–	0	6	–	6	–	0
Colorado State	3	–	4	–	0	4	–	7	–	1
Wyoming	2	–	5	–	0	4	–	8	–	0
UTEP	0	–	7	–	0	2	–	9	–	0
$ – Conference champion; Rankings from AP Poll

The 1979 San Diego State Aztecs football team represented San Diego State University during the 1979 NCAA Division I-A football season as a member of the Western Athletic Conference (WAC).

The team was led by head coach Claude Gilbert, in his seventh year, and played home games at San Diego Stadium (Note: San Diego County Credit Union Stadium (SDCCU Stadium) was known as San Diego Stadium from its opening in 1967 through 1980.) in San Diego, California. They finished with a record of eight wins and three losses (8–3, 4–2 WAC).

== Schedule ==
Date	Opponent	Site	TV	Result	Attendance	Source
September 8	at No. 12 Missouri*	Memorial Stadium; Columbia, MO		L 15–45	62,168	
September 22	at Fresno State*	Ratcliffe Stadium; Fresno, CA (rivalry)		W 32–23	15,235	
September 29	Wisconsin*	San Diego Stadium; San Diego, CA		W 24–17	38,633	
October 6	at New Mexico	University Stadium; Albuquerque, NM		W 35–7	21,205	
October 13	Miami (FL)*	San Diego Stadium; San Diego, CA		W 31–20	40,126	
October 20	at Colorado State	Hughes Stadium; Fort Collins, CO		L 3–37	21,950	
October 27	at Utah	Robert Rice Stadium; Salt Lake City, UT		W 17–13	22,196	
November 3	Wyoming^{†}	San Diego Stadium; San Diego, CA		W 31–21	36,386	
November 10	Arizona*	San Diego Stadium; San Diego, CA		W 42–10	38,581	
November 17	UTEP	San Diego Stadium; San Diego, CA		W 42–20	37,110	
November 24	No. 10 BYU	San Diego Stadium; San Diego, CA	ABC (Note: This was the first ever nationally televised game for San Diego State)	L 14–63	46,121	
*Non-conference game; ^{†}Homecoming; Rankings from AP Poll released prior to the game

== Team players in the NFL ==
The following were selected in the 1980 NFL draft.

Player	Position	Round	Overall	NFL team
Terrell Ward	Defensive back	7	188	Philadelphia Eagles
Kevin Fidel	Center	10	263	Cleveland Browns

The following finished their college career in 1979, were not drafted, but played in the NFL.

Player	Position	First NFL team
Lucious Smith	Defensive back	1980 Los Angeles Rams

== Team awards ==
Award	Player
Most Valuable Player (John Simcox Memorial Trophy)	Tony Allen
Outstanding Offensive & Defensive Linemen (Byron H. Chase Memorial Trophy)	Pete Inge, Off; Randy Mastin, Def
Team captains Dr. R. Hardy / C.E. Peterson Memorial Trophy	Pete Inge, Off
Most Inspirational Player	Terrell Ward
