= Regester Log House =

Historic house in Pennsylvania, United States

- U.S. National Register of Historic Places
- Washington County History & Landmarks Foundation Landmark
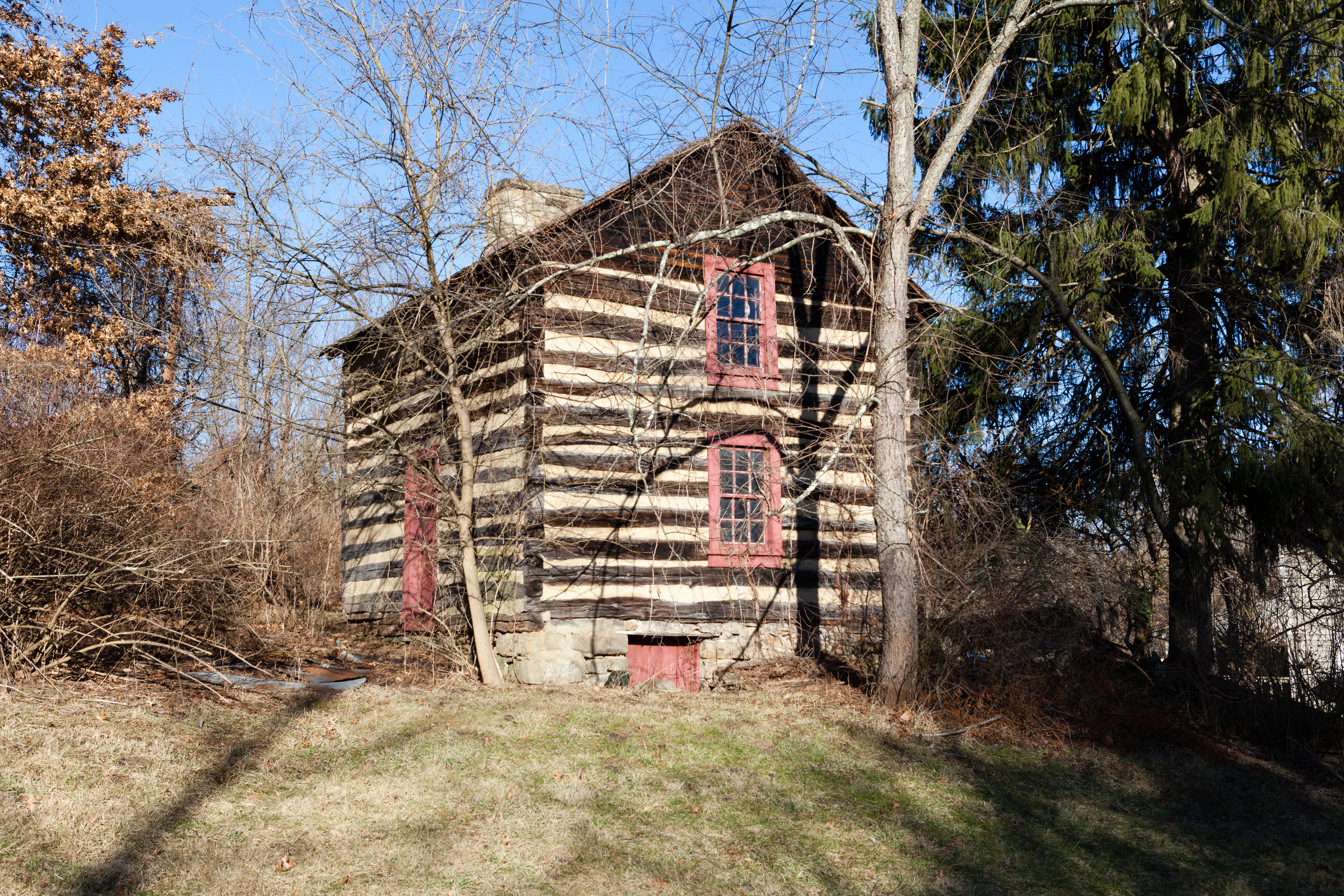
- The house in January 2015

- Location within Pennsylvania Location within the United States
- Nearest city: Fredericktown, Pennsylvania
- Coordinates: 40°0′42.5″N 79°59′45″W
- Area: 1 acre (0.40 ha)
- Built: 1830
- NRHP reference No.: 74001810
- Added to NRHP: October 16, 1974

The Regester Log House is an historic log house in Fredericktown, Pennsylvania, United States.

== History and architectural features ==
At the time that this building was added to the National Register of Historic Places in 1974, it consisted of two, two-story houses that were joined in an L-shape, the long side of one house flush with the short side of the other with roofs joined. An unusual configuration at the time, little has been documented about the size and manner of joining the two houses. Construction of the older house occurred during the second quarter of the nineteenth century with the addition created sometime later.

By 2014, only one of the two houses remained. Slightly relocated, it was placed on a new foundation.

The building was also designated as a historic residential landmark/farmstead by the Washington County History & Landmarks Foundation.
