= 1981 Long Beach State 49ers football team =

American college football season

1981 Long Beach State 49ers football
- Conference: Pacific Coast Athletic Association
- Record: 2–8 (1–4 PCAA)
- Head coach: Dave Currey (5th season)
- Defensive coordinator: Ken Visser (1st season)
- Home stadium: Anaheim Stadium

1981 Pacific Coast Athletic Association football standings
	Conf.					Overall
Team	W		L		T	W		L		T
San Jose State $	5	–	0	–	0	9	–	3	–	0
Utah State	4	–	1	–	1	5	–	5	–	1
Fresno State	2	–	3	–	0	5	–	6	–	0
Pacific (CA)	2	–	3	–	0	5	–	6	–	0
Cal State Fullerton	1	–	4	–	0	3	–	8	–	0
Long Beach State	1	–	4	–	0	2	–	8	–	0
$ – Conference champion

The 1981 Long Beach State 49ers football team represented California State University, Long Beach (Note: The official name of Long Beach State has been California State University, Long Beach since 1972. However, it is still commonly known as Long Beach State.) during the 1981 NCAA Division I-A football season.

Cal State Long Beach competed in the Pacific Coast Athletic Association. (Note: The Big West Conference was known as the Pacific Coast Athletic Association from its founding in 1969 through 1987.) The team was led by fifth-year head coach Dave Currey, and played home games at Anaheim Stadium in Anaheim, California. They finished the season with a record of two wins, eight losses (2–8, 1–4 PCAA).

== Schedule ==
Date	Time	Opponent	Site	Result	Attendance	Source
September 5	1:30 pm	No. 16 BYU*	Anaheim Stadium; Anaheim, CA	L 8–31	20,953	
September 12	4:30 pm	at Northern Illinois*	Huskie Stadium; DeKalb, IL	W 17–7	21,819	
September 19	4:00 pm	at Louisville*	Fairgrounds Stadium; Louisville, KY	L 13–35	23,424	
September 26	7:30 pm	at UNLV*	Las Vegas Silver Bowl; Whitney, NV	L 31–32	25,080	
October 3	11:30 am	at Drake*	Drake Stadium; Des Moines, IA	L 7–18	16,730	
October 17	7:30 pm	Pacific (CA)	Anaheim Stadium; Anaheim, CA	L 10–17	8,646	
October 24	1:30 pm	at Cal State Fullerton	Titan Field; Fullerton, CA	W 10–9	3,800	
November 7	7:30 pm	Utah State	Anaheim Stadium; Anaheim, CA	L 2–28	3,800	
November 14	7:30 pm	Fresno State	Anaheim Stadium; Anaheim, CA	L 30–31	5,077	
November 21	7:30 pm	San Jose State	Anaheim Stadium; Anaheim, CA	L 22–24	6,723	
*Non-conference game; Rankings from AP Poll released prior to the game; All times are in Pacific time

== Team players in the NFL ==
The following were selected in the 1982 NFL draft.

Player	Position	Round	Overall	NFL team
Mike Horan	Punter	9	235	Atlanta Falcons
