= 1981 Air Force Falcons football team =

American college football season

1981 Air Force Falcons football
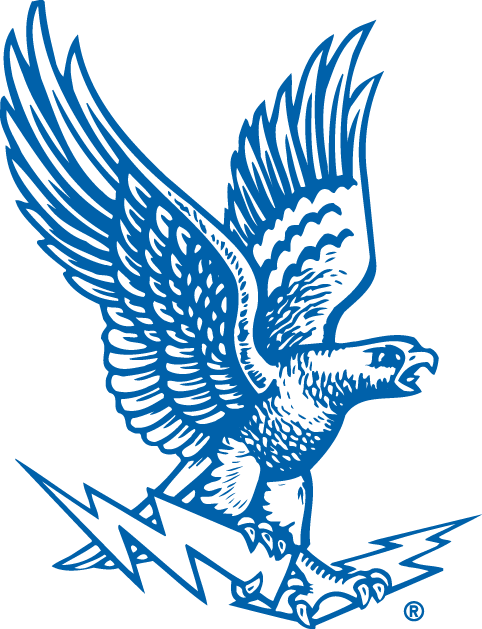
- Conference: Western Athletic Conference
- Record: 4–7 (2–3 WAC)
- Head coach: Ken Hatfield (3rd season)
- Offensive coordinator: Fisher DeBerry (1st season)
- Offensive scheme: Wishbone triple option
- Defensive coordinator: Chan Gailey (1st season)
- Base defense: 3–4
- Captains: Ed Antoine; Mike France
- Home stadium: Falcon Stadium

1981 Western Athletic Conference football standings
	Conf.					Overall
Team	W		L		T	W		L		T
No. 13 BYU $	7	–	1	–	0	11	–	2	–	0
Hawaii	5	–	1	–	0	9	–	2	–	0
Utah	4	–	1	–	1	8	–	2	–	1
Wyoming	6	–	2	–	0	8	–	3	–	0
New Mexico	3	–	4	–	1	4	–	7	–	1
Air Force	2	–	3	–	0	4	–	7	–	0
San Diego State	3	–	5	–	0	6	–	5	–	0
UTEP	1	–	6	–	0	1	–	10	–	0
Colorado State	0	–	8	–	0	0	–	12	–	0
$ – Conference champion; Rankings from AP Poll

The 1981 Air Force Falcons football team represented the United States Air Force Academy in the 1981 NCAA Division I-A football season. The team was led by third-year head coach Ken Hatfield and played its home games at Falcon Stadium. It finished the regular season with a 4–7 overall record and a 2–3 record in Western Athletic Conference games.

== Schedule ==
Date	Time	Opponent	Site	Result	Attendance	Source
September 12		at No. 15 BYU	Cougar Stadium; Provo, UT	L 21–45	38,712	
September 19		Wyoming	Falcon Stadium; Colorado Springs, CO	L 10–17	28,200	
September 26		at New Mexico	University Stadium; Albuquerque, NM	L 10–27	24,240	
October 3		Colorado State	Falcon Stadium; Colorado Springs, CO (rivalry)	W 28–14	20,300	
October 10		at Navy*	Navy–Marine Corps Memorial Stadium; Annapolis, MD (Commander-in-Chief's Trophy)	L 13–30	31,191	
October 17		Tulane*	Falcon Stadium; Colorado Springs, CO	L 13–31	18,467	
October 24	2:00 p.m.	at Oregon*	Autzen Stadium; Eugene, OR	W 20–10	23,290	
October 31		Army*	Falcon Stadium; Colorado Springs, CO	W 7–3	31,535	
November 14	1:00 p.m.	Notre Dame*	Falcon Stadium; Colorado Springs, CO (rivalry)	L 7–35	36,800	
November 21		at UNLV*	Las Vegas Silver Bowl; Las Vegas, NV	L 21–24	22,574	
November 28		vs. San Diego State	Olympic Memorial Stadium; Tokyo, Japan (Mirage Bowl)	W 21–16	60,000	
*Non-conference game; Rankings from AP Poll released prior to the game; All times are in Central time

== Roster ==
1981 Air Force Falcons football team roster
Players
Coaches
Offense

Pos.	#	Name	Class
FB		John Kershner	So
OL		Dave Schrek	Jr

Defense

Pos.	#	Name	Class
DL		Chris Funk	Fr
S		Johnny Jackson	Sr

Special teams

Pos.	#	Name	Class

Head coach

- Ken Hatfield

Coordinators/assistant coaches

- Mike Heimerdinger (Wide receivers)

Legend

- (C) Team captain
- (S) Suspended
- (I) Ineligible
- Injured
- Redshirt
