= Aaronsburg, Washington County, Pennsylvania =

Unincorporated community in Pennsylvania, US

Aaronsburg (Washington County), Pennsylvania
- census-designated place
- Location within Pennsylvania Location within the United States
- Coordinates: 40°00′39″N 79°59′49″W
- Country: United States
- State: Pennsylvania
- County: Washington

Population (2010)
  - Total: 259
- Time zone: UTC-5 (Eastern (EST))
  - Summer (DST): UTC-4 (EDT)
- FIPS code: 42-00104

Aaronsburg is a census-designated place located in East Bethlehem Township, Washington County in the state of Pennsylvania. The community is located just to the north of Fredericktown along Pennsylvania Route 88 which travels along the Monongahela River. As of the 2010 census the population was 259 residents.
