= 1981 San Diego State Aztecs football team =

American college football season

1981 San Diego State Aztecs football
- Conference: Western Athletic Conference
- Record: 6–5 (3–5 WAC)
- Head coach: Doug Scovil (1st season)
- Offensive scheme: West Coast
- Base defense: 4–3
- Home stadium: Jack Murphy Stadium

1981 Western Athletic Conference football standings
	Conf.					Overall
Team	W		L		T	W		L		T
No. 13 BYU $	7	–	1	–	0	11	–	2	–	0
Hawaii	5	–	1	–	0	9	–	2	–	0
Utah	4	–	1	–	1	8	–	2	–	1
Wyoming	6	–	2	–	0	8	–	3	–	0
New Mexico	3	–	4	–	1	4	–	7	–	1
Air Force	2	–	3	–	0	4	–	7	–	0
San Diego State	3	–	5	–	0	6	–	5	–	0
UTEP	1	–	6	–	0	1	–	10	–	0
Colorado State	0	–	8	–	0	0	–	12	–	0
$ – Conference champion; Rankings from AP Poll

The 1981 San Diego State Aztecs football team represented San Diego State University during the 1981 NCAA Division I-A football season as a member of the Western Athletic Conference (WAC).

The team was led by head coach Doug Scovil, in his first year, and played home games at Jack Murphy Stadium (Note: San Diego County Credit Union Stadium (SDCCU Stadium) was known as Jack Murphy Stadium from 1981 through 1997. It had been called San Diego Stadium from its opening in 1967 through 1980.) in San Diego, California. They finished with a record of six wins and five losses (6–5, 3–5 WAC).

The Aztecs were chosen to participate in the annual Mirage Bowl in 1981. This counted as a regular season game, and was played at the end of the season in Tokyo, Japan. They played the Air Force Academy on Nov. 29.

== Schedule ==
Date	Opponent	Site	Result	Attendance	Source
September 12	at Colorado State	Hughes Stadium; Fort Collins, CO	W 30–14	25,287	
September 26	at Oklahoma State*	Lewis Field; Stillwater, OK	W 23–16	45,000	
October 3	at New Mexico	University Stadium; Albuquerque, NM	W 17–15	18,265	
October 10	No. 12 Iowa State*	Jack Murphy Stadium; San Diego, CA	W 52–31	45,750	
October 17	BYU	Jack Murphy Stadium; San Diego, CA	L 7–27	41,727	
October 24	Hawaii	Jack Murphy Stadium; San Diego, CA	L 10–28	33,167	
October 31	at Utah	Robert Rice Stadium; Salt Lake City, UT	L 14–17	28,513	
November 7	Wyoming^{†}	Jack Murphy Stadium; San Diego, CA	L 13–24	30,361	
November 14	at UNLV*	Las Vegas Silver Bowl; Whitney, NV	W 38–20	23,090	
November 21	UTEP	Jack Murphy Stadium; San Diego, CA	W 59–14	20,824	
November 29	Air Force	Olympic Memorial Stadium; Tokyo, Japan (Mirage Bowl)	L 16–21	60,000	
*Non-conference game; ^{†}Homecoming; Rankings from AP Poll released prior to the game

== Team players in the NFL ==
The following were selected in the 1982 NFL draft.

Player	Position	Round	Overall	NFL team
Matt Kofler	Quarterback	2	48	Buffalo Bills
Vernon Dean	Defensive back	2	49	Washington Redskins

The following finished their college career in 1981, were not drafted, but played in the NFL.

Player	Position	First NFL team
Darryl Hall	Defensive back	1987 Los Angeles Rams
Rob Harrison	Defensive back	1987 Los Angeles Raiders

== Team awards ==
Award	Player
Most Valuable Player (John Simcox Memorial Trophy)	Matt Kofler
Outstanding Offensive & Defensive Linemen (Byron H. Chase Memorial Trophy)	Matt Long, Off; Mike Vance, Def
Team captains Dr. R. Hardy / C.E. Peterson Memorial Trophy	Matt Kofler, Off; Vernon Dean, Def
Most Inspirational Player	Jerome Franey
