= Bill Michael =

American football player and coach (1935–2016)

Biographical details
- Born: February 28, 1935; Rienzi, Mississippi, U.S.
- Died: March 4, 2016 (aged 81); Columbia, South Carolina, U.S.

Playing career
- 1956–1958: Arkansas

Coaching career (HC unless noted)
- 1959: Arkansas (freshmen)
- 1960–1961: Thomas Jefferson (TX) (assistant)
- 1962: Sherman HS (TX) (assistant)
- 1963: Caprock HS (TX) (line)
- 1964–1966: Texas Western (DC)
- 1967–1968: Oklahoma (DE)
- 1969–1972: Oklahoma (OL)
- 1977–1981: UTEP
- 1982-1985: South Carolina (DL)
- 1986: Texas (LB)
- 1987-1990: Purdue (TE/OT)
- 1991: Southern Miss (DL)
- 1992–1993: Oklahoma State (OC)
- 1994: North Texas (DC)
- 1995–1997: North Texas (asst. HC)
- 1998–1999: North Texas (DC)
- 2000: North Texas (OL/TE)

Head coaching record
- Overall: 5–43

Billy Gene Michael (February 28, 1935 – March 4, 2016) was an American football player and coach. He served as the head football coach at the University of Texas at El Paso (UTEP) from 1977 to 1981. He compiled a 5–43 (.104) record, which eventually led to his firing in 1981. He lost 10 consecutive games twice, in periods from 1977 to 1978 and 1979 to 1980.

== Coaching career ==
Michael's coaching career began at his alma mater, Arkansas, in 1959 when he coached the freshmen team. In 1960 and 1961 he worked as an assistant football coach at Thomas Jefferson High School, in Port Arthur, Texas, under head coach Clarence Underwood. In 1962 Michael moved to Sherman High School to serve as an assistant to Dave Smith. The following year, he joined the staff at the newly-formed Caprock High School, in Amarillo, Texas, as line coach.

Michael coached at Oklahoma. He served as a defensive coach at the University of South Carolina starting in 1982.

== Head coaching record ==
Year	Team	Overall	Conference	Standing
UTEP Miners (Western Athletic Conference) (1977–1981)
1977	UTEP	1–10	0–7	8th
1978	UTEP	1–11	1–5	7th
1979	UTEP	2–9	0–7	8th
1980	UTEP	1–11	1–6	9th
1981	UTEP	0–2 (Note: Michael was fired after two games. Billy Alton served as interim head coach for the remaining nine games of the season. UTEP finished the season 1–10 overall, placing eighth in the conference with a mark of 1–6.)	0–0	
UTEP:		5–43	2–25	
Total:		5–43		
