= East Bethlehem Township, Washington County, Pennsylvania =

Township in Pennsylvania, US

Coordinates: 39°59′30″N 79°59′49″W

East Bethlehem Township
- Township
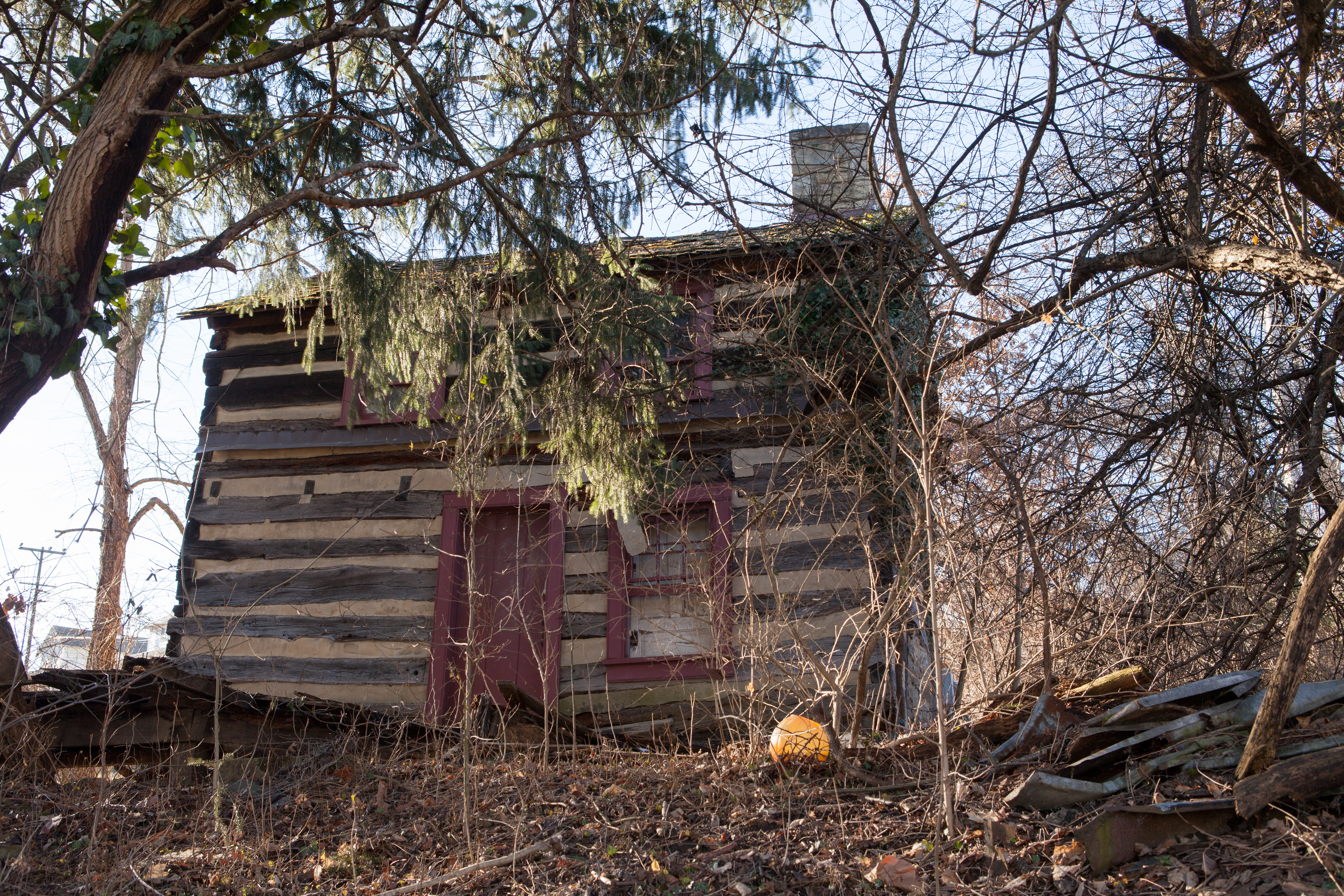
- The Regester Log House, a historic site in the township

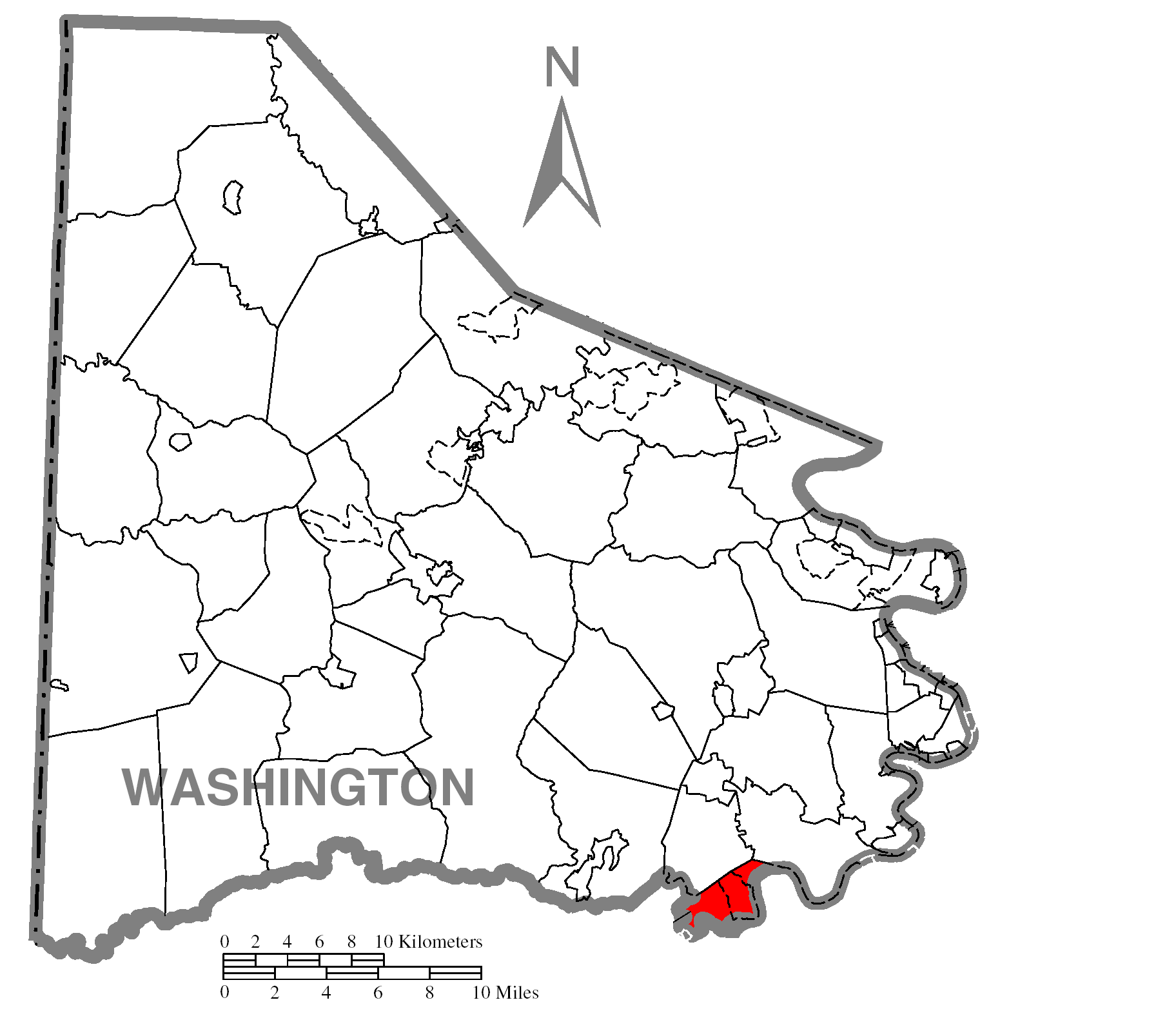
- Location of East Bethlehem Township in Washington County

- Location of Washington County in Pennsylvania
- Country: United States
- State: Pennsylvania
- County: Washington County

Area
  - Total: 5.32 sq mi (13.78 km^{2})
  - Land: 5.07 sq mi (13.12 km^{2})
  - Water: 0.25 sq mi (0.66 km^{2})

Population (2020)
  - Total: 2,313 ▼
  - Estimate (2023): 2,286
  - Density: 450/sq mi (173.8/km^{2})
- Time zone: UTC-4 (EST)
  - Summer (DST): UTC-5 (EDT)
- Area code: 724
- FIPS code: 42-125-20808
- Website: www.eastbethtwp.com

Historical population
Census	Pop.	Note	%±
2000	2,524		—
2010	2,354		−6.7%
2020	2,313		−1.7%
2025 (est.)	2,238		−3.2%
U.S. Decennial Census

East Bethlehem Township is a township in Washington County, Pennsylvania, United States. The population was 2,313 at the 2020 census. The township contains the Frederickstown-Millsboro census-designated place.

== History ==
Bethlehem Township, formed in 1781, was split into East and West Bethlehem Townships in 1790.

The Regester Log House was listed on the National Register of Historic Places in 1974.

== Geography ==
According to the United States Census Bureau, the township has a total area of 5.3 square miles (14 km^{2}), of which 5.1 square miles (13 km^{2}) is land and 0.2 square miles (0.52 km^{2}) (4.31%) is water. It contains the census-designated places of Aaronsburg, Fredericktown, and Millsboro.

== Demographics ==
At the 2000 census there were 2,524 people, 1,048 households, and 704 families living in the township. The population density was 494.0 inhabitants per square mile (190.7/km^{2}). There were 1,210 housing units at an average density of 236.8 per square mile (91.4/km^{2}). The racial makeup of the township was 96.12% White, 2.38% African American, 0.40% Native American, 0.04% Asian, 0.12% from other races, and 0.95% from two or more races. Hispanic or Latino of any race were 0.48%.

Of the 1,048 households 28.3% had children under the age of 18 living with them, 52.5% were married couples living together, 11.5% had a female householder with no husband present, and 32.8% were non-families. 29.0% of households were one person and 18.2% were one person aged 65 or older. The average household size was 2.41 and the average family size was 2.95.

The age distribution was 21.8% under the age of 18, 8.6% from 18 to 24, 26.2% from 25 to 44, 23.7% from 45 to 64, and 19.6% 65 or older. The median age was 40 years. For every 100 females there were 86.7 males. For every 100 females age 18 and over, there were 84.0 males.

The median household income was $24,103 and the median family income was $29,231. Males had a median income of $29,485 versus $17,275 for females. The per capita income for the township was $13,024. About 14.4% of families and 18.6% of the population were below the poverty line, including 32.0% of those under age 18 and 9.7% of those age 65 or over.

== Notable person ==
- Jonathan Knight (1787–1858), U.S. Congressman for Pennsylvania's 20th congressional district
