= Fredericktown-Millsboro, Pennsylvania =

Fredericktown-Millsboro
- Former CDP
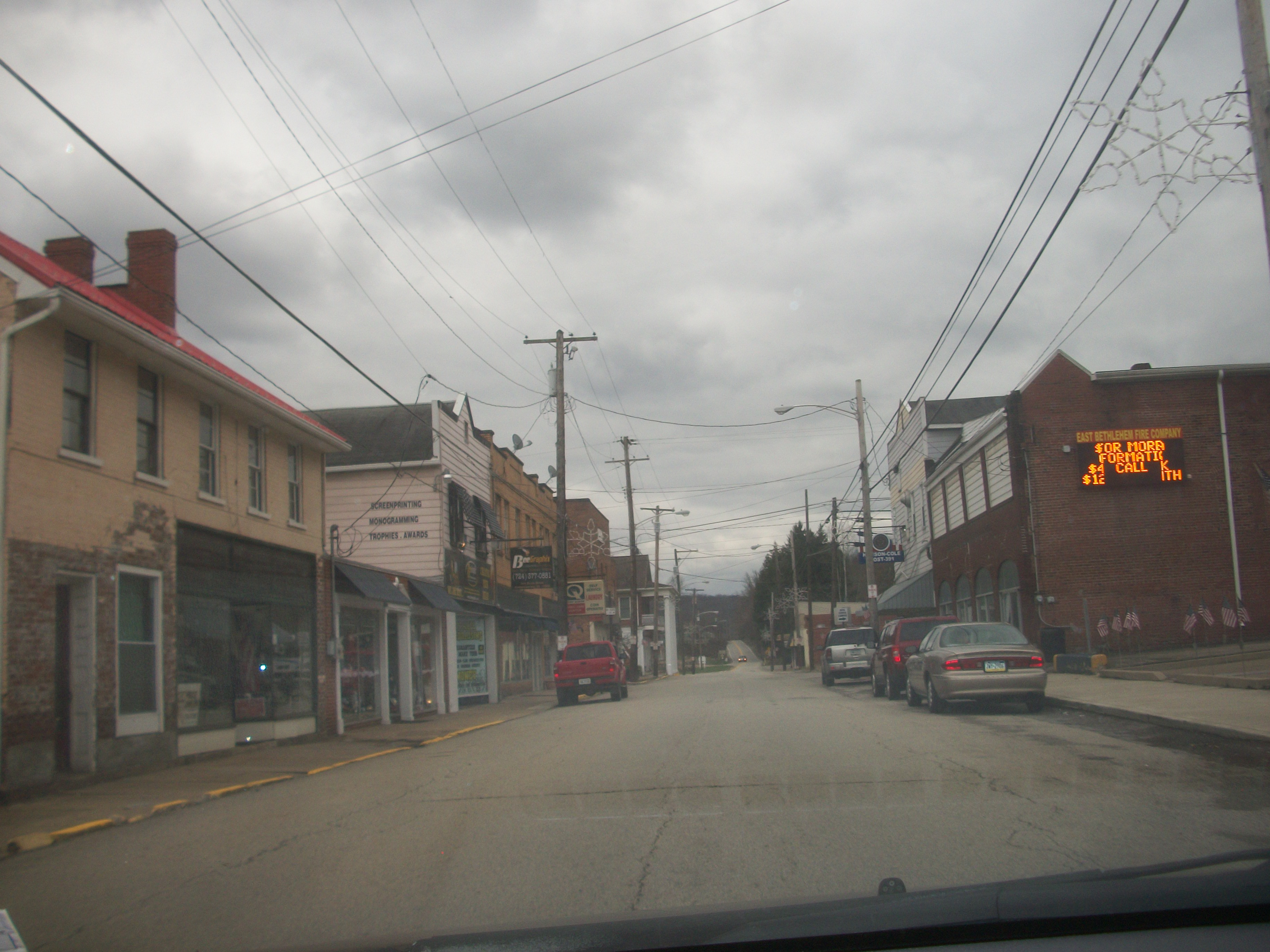
- Fredericktown from Route 88

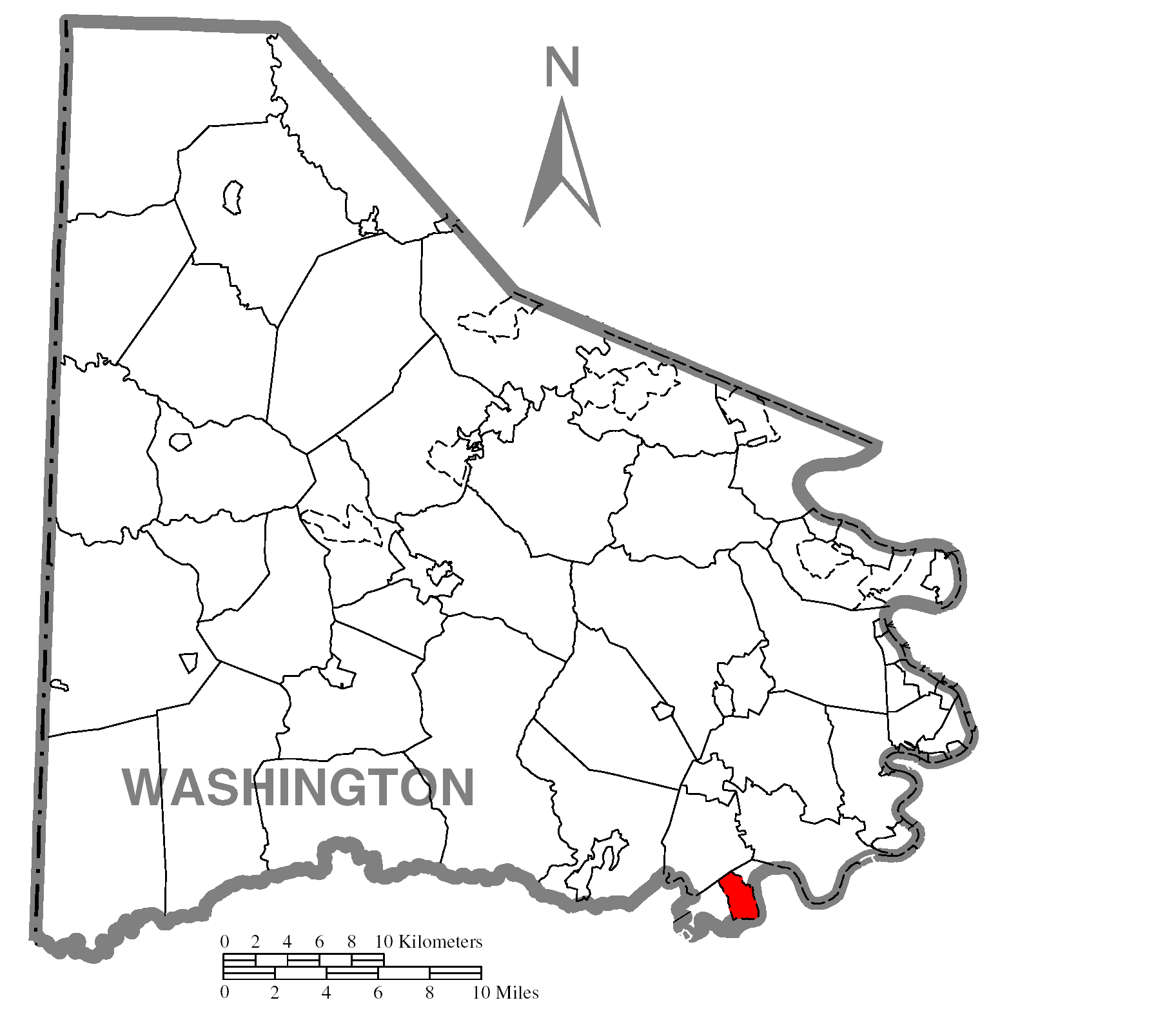
- Location of Fredericktown-Millsboro in Washington County
- Coordinates: 39°59′42″N 79°59′58″W
- Country: United States
- State: Pennsylvania
- County: Washington

Area
  - Total: 1.8 sq mi (4.7 km^{2})

Population (2000)
  - Total: 1,094
  - Density: 610/sq mi (230/km^{2})
- Time zone: UTC-4 (EST)
  - Summer (DST): UTC-5 (EDT)
- Area code: 724

Fredericktown-Millsboro was a census-designated place (CDP) in East Bethlehem Township, Washington County, Pennsylvania, United States. The population was 1,094 at the 2000 census. For the 2010 census the area was split into two CDPs, Fredericktown and Millsboro.

== Geography ==
The Fredericktown-Millsboro CDP was located at 39°59′42″N 79°59′58″W (39.995095, -79.999370).

According to the United States Census Bureau, the CDP had a total area of 1.8 square miles (4.7 km^{2}), all of it land.

Both Fredericktown and Millsboro are located along the Monongahela River in the river valley. The communities and the surrounding areas are the former homes of bituminous coal mines. The topography has been somewhat altered by the addition of slate dumps: large mounds of coal byproducts have been created on the riverbanks.

== Demographics ==
As of the census of 2000, there were 1,094 people, 446 households, and 290 families residing in the CDP. The population density was 624.3 people per square mile (241.0 people/km^{2}). There were 510 housing units at an average density of 291.0 per square mile (112.4/km^{2}). The racial makeup of the CDP was 97.90% White, 1.01% African American, 0.27% Native American, and 0.82% from two or more races. Hispanic or Latino of any race were 0.37% of the population.

There were 446 households, out of which 29.4% had children under the age of 18 living with them, 52.2% were married couples living together, 9.6% had a female householder with no husband present, and 34.8% were non-families. 30.7% of all households were made up of individuals, and 18.4% had someone living alone who was 65 years of age or older. The average household size was 2.45 and the average family size was 3.07.

In the CDP, the population was spread out, with 22.1% under the age of 18, 8.4% from 18 to 24, 27.1% from 25 to 44, 23.5% from 45 to 64, and 18.8% who were 65 years of age or older. The median age was 40 years. For every 100 females, there were 90.6 males. For every 100 females age 18 and over, there were 85.6 males.

The median income for a household in the CDP was $25,086, and the median income for a family was $32,292. Males had a median income of $27,188 versus $17,120 for females. The per capita income for the CDP was $13,425. About 10.0% of families and 13.5% of the population were below the poverty line, including 21.9% of those under age 18 and 8.2% of those age 65 or over.
