= 1979 BYU Cougars football team =

American college football season

1979 BYU Cougars football

WAC champion

Holiday Bowl, L 37–38 vs. Indiana
- Conference: Western Athletic Conference

Ranking
- Coaches: No. 12
- AP: No. 13
- Record: 11–1 (7–0 WAC)
- Head coach: LaVell Edwards (7th season)
- Offensive coordinator: Doug Scovil (3rd season)
- Offensive scheme: West Coast
- Defensive coordinator: Fred Whittingham (1st season)
- Base defense: 4–3
- Home stadium: Cougar Stadium

1979 Western Athletic Conference football standings
| | Conf. | | | | | Overall |
| Team | W | | L | | T | W | | L | | T |
|---|---|---|---|---|---|---|---|---|---|---|
| No. 13 BYU $ | 7 | – | 0 | – | 0 | 11 | – | 1 | – | 0 |
| Utah | 5 | – | 2 | – | 0 | 6 | – | 6 | – | 0 |
| San Diego State | 4 | – | 2 | – | 0 | 8 | – | 3 | – | 0 |
| Hawaii | 3 | – | 3 | – | 0 | 6 | – | 5 | – | 0 |
| New Mexico | 3 | – | 4 | – | 0 | 6 | – | 6 | – | 0 |
| Colorado State | 3 | – | 4 | – | 0 | 4 | – | 7 | – | 1 |
| Wyoming | 2 | – | 5 | – | 0 | 4 | – | 8 | – | 0 |
| UTEP | 0 | – | 7 | – | 0 | 2 | – | 9 | – | 0 |
$ – Conference champion; Rankings from AP Poll

The 1979 BYU Cougars football team represented Brigham Young University (BYU) for the 1979 NCAA Division I-A football season. The Cougars were led by eighth-year head coach LaVell Edwards and played their home games at Cougar Stadium in Provo, Utah. The team competed as a member of the Western Athletic Conference, winning the conference title for the fourth consecutive year with a conference record of 7–0. BYU finished the regular season with an undefeated record of 11–0. BYU was invited to the 1979 Holiday Bowl, where they lost to Indiana. They were ranked 13th in the final AP Poll and 12th in the final Coaches Poll.

== Schedule ==
| Date | Opponent | Rank | Site | TV | Result | Attendance | Source |
|---|---|---|---|---|---|---|---|
| September 8 | at No. 14 Texas A&M* | | Rice Stadium; Houston, TX | | W 18–17 | 40,000 | |
| September 15 | Weber State* | | Cougar Stadium; Provo, UT | | W 48–3 | 33,161 | |
| September 29 | UTEP | | Cougar Stadium; Provo, UT | | W 31–7 | 34,724 | |
| October 5 | Hawaii | No. 20 | Cougar Stadium; Provo, UT | | W 38–15 | 34,741 | |
| October 13 | at Utah State* | No. 16 | Romney Stadium; Logan, UT | | W 48–24 | 28,094 | |
| October 20 | at Wyoming | No. 13 | War Memorial Stadium; Laramie, WY | | W 54–14 | 14,723 | |
| October 27 | New Mexico | No. 11 | Cougar Stadium; Provo, UT | | W 59–7 | 33,921 | |
| November 3 | at Colorado State | No. 11 | Hughes Stadium; Fort Collins, CO | | W 30–7 | 25,612 | |
| November 9 | at Long Beach State* | No. 11 | Anaheim Stadium; Anaheim, CA | | W 31–17 | 20,051 | |
| November 17 | Utah | No. 10 | Cougar Stadium; Provo, UT | | W 27–0 | 40,236 | |
| November 24 | at San Diego State | No. 10 | San Diego Stadium; San Diego, CA | ABC | W 63–14 | 46,121 | |
| December 21 | vs. Indiana* | No. 9 | San Diego Stadium; San Diego, CA (Holiday Bowl) | | L 37–38 | 52,500 | |
*Non-conference game; Rankings from AP Poll released prior to the game

== Game summaries ==
=== Vs. Texas A&M ===
BYU Cougars (0–0) at #14 Texas A&M Aggies (0–0)

| Quarter | 1 | 2 | 3 | 4 | Total |
|---|---|---|---|---|---|
| BYU | 0 | 3 | 7 | 8 | 18 |
| Texas A&M | 7 | 0 | 7 | 3 | 17 |

at Rice Stadium, Houston, Texas

- Date: September 8, 1979
- Game attendance: 40,000
- Box Score

Game information

First quarter

- A&M – David Brothers 1-yard run (David Hardy kick). Texas A&M 7–0.

Second quarter

- BYU – Brent Johnson 27-yard field goal. Texas A&M 7–3.

Third quarter

- A&M – Mike Mosley 7-yard run (David Hardy kick). Texas A&M 14–3.
- BYU – Dan Plater 20-yard pass from Marc Wilson (Brent Johnson kick). Texas A&M 14–10.

Fourth quarter

- A&M – David Hardy 37-yard field goal. Texas A&M 17–16.
- BYU – Clay Brown 3-yard pass from Marc Wilson (pass good), 0:52. BYU 18–17.

Top passers

- BYU – Marc Wilson – 17/35, 165 yards, 2 TD, 3 INT
- A&M – Mike Mosley – 9/13, 125 yards

Top rushers

- BYU – Homer Jones – 7 rushes, 53 yards
- A&M – Curtis Dickey – 28 rushes, 148 yards

Top receivers

- BYU – Dan Plater – 3 receptions, 49 yards, TD
- A&M – Gerald Carter – 6 receptions, 104 yards

The game was played at Rice Stadium because Kyle Field was being renovated.

QB Marc Wilson had undergone an emergency appendectomy and had lost weight during the week of the game.

The defense carried the offense that was still finding its rhythm with a blocked punt and a goal line stand. The ailing Wilson drove BYU down the field to score with 52 seconds left to pull within 17–16. Coach Edwards let the team decide whether to go for the tie or the win and they chose the latter. The attempt was converted and BYU put itself in the national spotlight with a major upset.

External videos
- 1979 vs. Texas A&M – Game-winning touchdown & two-point conversion

=== Utah ===
| Team | 1 | 2 | 3 | 4 | Total |
|---|---|---|---|---|---|
| Utah | 0 | 0 | 0 | 0 | 0 |
| • BYU | 17 | 3 | 7 | 0 | 27 |

- Date: November 18
- Location: Cougar Stadium, Provo, Utah
- Game attendance: 40,236

Scoring summary
| 1 | BYU | Matt Braga 14-yard run (Johnson kick) | BYU 7-0 |
| 1 | BYU | H. Jones 5-yard run (Johnson kick) | BYU 14-0 |
| 1 | BYU | Johnson 39-yard field goal | BYU 17-0 |
| 2 | BYU | Johnson 44-yard field goal | BYU 20-0 |
| 3 | BYU | Matt Braga 18-yard pass from Marc Wilson (Johnson kick) | BYU 27-0 |

Marc Wilson threw for 374 yards as BYU clinched at least a share of the WAC title and set up a showdown with San Diego State for the following week. Wilson set an NCAA record for the most passing yards against a single opponent in two games and tied Rice's Tommy Kramer 1976 record for 300-yard passing games in a season with seven.

=== Game 12: Holiday Bowl (vs. Indiana) ===
Marc Wilson 28/43, 380 yards, 2 TD, TD rushing

== Personnel ==
1979 BYU Cougars football team roster
Players
Coaches
Offense

| Pos. | # | Name | Class |
|---|---|---|---|
| TE | 85 | Clay Brown | Jr |
| WR | 3 | Scott Collie | Fr |
| OT | 72 | Nick Eyre | Jr |
| WR | 87 | Lloyd Jones | Jr |
| RB | 36 | Eric Lane | Jr |
| QB | 9 | Jim McMahon (injured) | Jr |
| OT | 64 | Andy Reid | Jr |
| QB | 6 | Marc Wilson | Sr |

Defense

| Pos. | # | Name | Class |
|---|---|---|---|
| DT | 78 | Chuck Ehin | Fr |
| LB | 48 | Scott Garrett | Jr |
| DE | 83 | Mat Mendenhall | Sr |
| DE | 77 | Mike Morgan | Fr |
| LB | 41 | Glen Redd | Jr |
| LB | 59 | Kyle Whittingham | So |

Special teams

| Pos. | # | Name | Class |
|---|---|---|---|
| K | 2 | Brent Johnson | Sr |

Head coach

- LaVell Edwards

Coordinators/assistant coaches

Legend

- (C) Team captain
- (S) Suspended
- (I) Ineligible
- Injured
- Redshirt

Roster
