= Millsboro, Pennsylvania =

Unincorporated community in Pennsylvania, US

- census-designated place
- Interactive map of Millsboro, Pennsylvania
- Coordinates: 39°59′11″N 79°59′36″W
- Country: United States
- State: Pennsylvania
- County: Washington

Area
  - Total: 0.79 sq mi (2.04 km^{2})
  - Land: 0.79 sq mi (2.04 km^{2})
  - Water: 0 sq mi (0.00 km^{2})

Population (2020)
  - Total: 580
  - Density: 735.9/sq mi (284.12/km^{2})
- Time zone: UTC-5 (Eastern (EST))
  - Summer (DST): UTC-4 (EDT)
- FIPS code: 42-49880

Millsboro is a census-designated place located in East Bethlehem Township, Washington County, Pennsylvania. The community was part of the Fredericktown-Millsboro CDP for the 2000 census but was split into two separate CDPs for the 2010 census, the other community being Fredericktown. Millsboro is located in far southern Washington County, along Pennsylvania Route 88, which travels along the Monongahela River. As of the 2010 census the population was 666 residents.

== Demographics ==
Historical population
Census	Pop.	Note	%±
2010	666		—
2020	580		−12.9%
U.S. Decennial Census

== Notable people ==
- Billy Barty (1924–2000), actor and activist
