= 1981 Fresno State Bulldogs football team =

American college football season

1981 Fresno State Bulldogs football
- Conference: Pacific Coast Athletic Association
- Record: 5–6 (2–3 PCAA)
- Head coach: Jim Sweeney (4th season)
- Home stadium: Bulldog Stadium

1981 Pacific Coast Athletic Association football standings
	Conf.					Overall
Team	W		L		T	W		L		T
San Jose State $	5	–	0	–	0	9	–	3	–	0
Utah State	4	–	1	–	1	5	–	5	–	1
Fresno State	2	–	3	–	0	5	–	6	–	0
Pacific (CA)	2	–	3	–	0	5	–	6	–	0
Cal State Fullerton	1	–	4	–	0	3	–	8	–	0
Long Beach State	1	–	4	–	0	2	–	8	–	0
$ – Conference champion

The 1981 Fresno State Bulldogs football team represented California State University, Fresno as a member of the Pacific Coast Athletic Association (PCAA) during the 1981 NCAA Division I-A football season. Led by fourth-year head coach Jim Sweeney, Fresno State compiled an overall record of 5–6 with a mark of 2–3 in conference play, tying for third place in the PCAA. The Bulldogs played their home games at Bulldog Stadium in Fresno, California.

== Schedule ==
Date	Opponent	Site	Result	Attendance	Source
September 5	Oregon*	Bulldog Stadium; Fresno, CA	W 23–16	28,637	
September 12	at Oregon State*	Parker Stadium; Corvallis, OR	L 28–31	28,000	
September 19	at Montana State*	Reno H. Sales Stadium; Bozeman, MT	L 26–30	7,127	
October 3	San Jose State	Bulldog Stadium; Fresno, CA (rivalry)	L 33–65	25,617	
October 10	Cal State Fullerton	Bulldog Stadium; Fresno, CA	L 10–13	20,348	
October 17	Southern Illinois*	Bulldog Stadium; Fresno, CA	L 18–24	16,385	
October 24	at Pacific (CA)	Pacific Memorial Stadium; Stockton, CA	W 30–27	13,500	
October 31	at Utah State	Romney Stadium; Logan, UT	L 0–20	13,086	
November 7	UNLV*	Bulldog Stadium; Fresno, CA	W 42–26	16,241	
November 14	at Long Beach State	Anaheim Stadium; Anaheim, CA	W 31–30	5,077	
November 21	at Arizona*	Arizona Stadium; Tucson, AZ	W 23–17	38,107	
*Non-conference game

== Team players in the NFL ==
The following were selected in the 1982 NFL draft.]

Player	Position	Round	Overall	NFL team
Tony Woodruff	Wide receiver	9	244	Philadelphia Eagles
Tim Washington	Defensive back	12	334	San Francisco 49ers
