= Mike Horan (American football) =

American football player (born 1959)

No. 2
- Position: Punter

Personal information
- Born: February 1, 1959 (age 67); Orange, California, U.S.
- Listed height: 5 ft 11 in (1.80 m)
- Listed weight: 192 lb (87 kg)

Career information
- High school: Sunny Hills (Fullerton, California)
- College: Long Beach State (1980-1981)
- NFL draft: 1982: 9th round, 235th overall pick

Career history
- Atlanta Falcons (1982)*; Green Bay Packers (1983)*; Buffalo Bills (1983)*; Philadelphia Eagles (1984–1985); Minnesota Vikings (1986)*; Denver Broncos (1986–1992); New York Giants (1993–1996); St. Louis Rams (1997); Chicago Bears (1998); St. Louis Rams (1999)
- * Offseason or practice squad member only

Awards and highlights
- Super Bowl champion (XXXIV); First-team All-Pro (1988); Pro Bowl (1988); NFL punting yards leader (1996)

Career NFL statistics
- Punts: 1,003
- Total yards: 42,286
- Avg. / Net. yards: 42.2 / 36.1
- Inside 20: 262
- Touchbacks: 83
- Fair catches: 104
- Stats at Pro Football Reference

Michael William Horan (born February 1, 1959) is an American former professional football player who was a punter in the National Football League (NFL). He played college football for the Long Beach State 49ers and was selected by the Atlanta Falcons in the ninth round of the 1982 NFL draft.

Although Horan played for five different teams during his career, he is best known for having punted for the Denver Broncos during their Super Bowl runs of the 1980s, and with the St. Louis Rams in their Super Bowl XXXIV victory over the Tennessee Titans. In that last Super Bowl with St. Louis (his fourth), he punted twice to tie the career record for most punts in for a punter in a Super Bowl with 17 total; he retired after the game ended.

He was selected to the Pro Bowl after the 1988 season, and named All-Pro, in which he had a 37.8 net average. He was known for his coffin corner punts.

== College career ==
Horan attended Sunny Hills High School, after graduating, he attended Fullerton College before transferring to Long Beach State.

In 1980, Horan appeared in 11 games. He recorded 58 punts for 2,369 yards. In 1981, he appeared in 10 games. He recorded 63 punts for 2,816 yards. He was named to the All-PCAA team.

In 2008, Horan was inducted to the Fullerton College Athletic Hall of Fame.

=== Career statistics ===
Year	Team	GP	Punting		
Year	Team	GP	Pnt	Yds	Avg
1980	LBS	11	58	2,369	40.8
1981	LBS	10	63	2,816	44.7
Career		21	121	5,185	42.9

== Professional career ==
=== Early career ===
Horan was selected in the ninth round (235th overall) of the 1982 NFL draft by the Atlanta Falcons, however he failed to make the team. The next year, he was signed by the Green Bay Packers, but failed his physical. He then spent time with the Buffalo Bills, but did not see any action during the regular season.

In 1984, Horan was signed by the Philadelphia Eagles and appeared in 16 games. He recorded 92 punts for 3,880 yards, with 21 inside the 20, and six touchbacks. In 1985, he appeared in 16 games. He recorded 91 punts for 3,777 yards, with 20 inside the 20 and 10 touchbacks. On August 29, 1986, he was released by the Eagles. He then spent a short amount of time with the Minnesota Vikings.

=== Denver Broncos ===
Horan then signed with the Denver Broncos after head coach Dan Reeves was informed by then New York Giants head coach Bill Parcells that Horan could potentially help the Broncos, who had already used two punters during the season.

In his first season with the Broncos, Horan appeared in the final four games of the season. He recorded 21 punts for 864 yards, with eight inside the 20, and two touchbacks. In 1987, he appeared in 12 games. He recorded 44 punts for 1,807 yards, with 11 inside the 20, and five touchbacks. In 1988, he appeared in 16 games. He recorded 65 punts for 2,861 yards, with 19 inside the 20 and one touchback. For his performance, he was named to the Pro Bowl. In 1989, he appeared in 16 games. He recorded 77 punts for 3,111 yards, with 24 inside the 20 and five touchbacks. In 1990, he appeared in 15 games. He recorded 58 punts for 2,575 yards, with 14 inside the 20 and six touchbacks. In 1991, he appeared in 16 games. He recorded 72 punts for 3,012 yards, with 24 inside the 20 and eight touchbacks. In 1992, he appeared in seven games. He recorded 37 punts for 1,681 yards, with seven inside the 20 and one touchback, before suffering a major knee injury that ended his season.

In August 1993, he was released by the Denver Broncos.

=== Later career ===
On November 10, 1993, Horan signed with the New York Giants after the team waived punter Sean Landeta. For the season, he appeared in eight games. He recorded 44 punts for 1,882 yards, with 13 inside the 20 and one touchback. On July 23, 1994, he was re-signed by the Giants. For the season, he appeared in 16 games. He recorded 85 punts for 3,521 yards, with 25 inside he 20 and seven touchbacks. In 1995, he appeared in 16 games. He recorded 72 punts for 3,063 yards, with 15 inside the 20 and eight touchbacks. On May 6, 1996, he was re-signed by the Giants. For the season, he appeared in 16 games. He recorded a career high 102 punts for a career high 4,289 yards, with, a career high, 32 inside the 20 and 10 touchbacks.

On October 14, 1997, Horan signed with the St. Louis Rams. For the season, he appeared in 10 games. He recorded 53 punts for 2,272 yards, with 10 inside the 20 and four touchbacks. On September 22, 1998, he signed with the Chicago Bears after Todd Sauerbrun tore his ACL in the third game of the season. For the season, Horan appeared in 13 games. He recorded 64 punts for 2,643 yards, with 12 inside the 20 and four touchbacks. On November 10, 1999, he re-signed with the St. Louis Rams. That season, he appeared in the final eight games of the season. He recorded 26 punts for 1,048 yards, with seven inside the 20 and four touchbacks. The final game of his career was the Rams' victory over the Tennessee Titans in Super Bowl XXXIV, during which he punted twice for 77 yards.

== NFL career statistics ==
Year	Team	GP	Punting							
Year	Team	GP	Pnt	Yds	Avg	Net	Lng	Blk	In20	TB
1984	PHI	16	92	3,880	42.2	35.6	69	0	21	6
1985	PHI	16	91	3,777	41.5	34.2	75	0	20	10
1986	DEN	4	21	864	41.1	34.5	50	0	8	2
1987	DEN	12	44	1,807	41.1	33.1	61	2	11	5
1988	DEN	16	65	2,861	44.0	37.8	70	0	19	2
1989	DEN	16	77	3,111	40.4	34.3	63	0	24	5
1990	DEN	15	58	2,575	44.4	38.9	67	1	14	6
1991	DEN	16	72	3,012	41.8	36.7	71	1	24	8
1992	DEN	7	37	1,681	45.4	40.2	62	1	7	1
1993	NYG	8	44	1,882	42.8	39.9	60	0	13	1
1994	NYG	16	85	3,521	41.1	35.3	63	2	25	7
1995	NYG	16	72	3,063	42.5	36.2	60	0	15	8
1996	NYG	16	102	4,289	42.0	35.9	63	0	32	10
1997	STL	10	53	2,272	42.9	36.3	60	0	10	4
1998	CHI	13	64	2,643	41.3	35.4	57	0	12	4
1999	STL	8	26	1,048	40.3	35.3	57	0	7	4
Career		205	1,003	42,286	42.2	36.1	75	7	262	83

== Post-football ==
After retiring, Horan began giving punting lessons in and around the Los Angeles, California area. In 2005, he appeared in the film Tennis, Anyone...?. In 2011, he attended an event in support of the Rams' return to Los Angeles; the team returned in 2016.
