= Aaronsburg, Ohio =

Coordinates: 40°23′54″N 82°41′42″W

Aaronsburg is an extinct town in Morrow County, in the U.S. state of Ohio.

== History ==
Aaronsburg was laid out in 1824 by Aaron Macomber, and named for him.
