= Chester Caddas =

American football coach (1935–2019)

Biographical details
- Born: July 30, 1935
- Died: July 27, 2019 (aged 83); Lexington, Kentucky, U.S.

Coaching career (HC unless noted)
- 1966–1967: Vanderbilt (assistant)
- 1968–1971: Pacific (CA) (assistant)
- 1972–1978: Pacific (CA)
- 1979–1981: Colorado State (DC)
- 1981: Colorado State (interim HC)
- 1982: Purdue (assistant)
- 1993–1996: Purdue (assistant)

Head coaching record
- Overall: 38–44–2

Chester Caddas (July 30, 1935 – July 27, 2019) was an American college football coach. He served as the head football coach at the University of the Pacific from 1972 to 1978 and as the interim head football coach Colorado State University in 1981, compiling a career head coaching record of 38–44–2.

Caddas graduated from Murray State College—now known as Murray State University—in 1957. He died on July 27, 2019, in Lexington, Kentucky.

== Head coaching record ==
Year	Team	Overall	Conference	Standing
Pacific Tigers (Pacific Coast Athletic Association) (1972–1978)
1972	Pacific	8–3	3–1	2nd
1973	Pacific	7–2–1	2–1–1	3rd
1974	Pacific	6–5	2–2	T–2nd
1975	Pacific	5–6–1	2–3	4th
1976	Pacific	2–9	0–4	5th
1977	Pacific	6–5	3–1	2nd
1978	Pacific	4–8	3–2	3rd
Pacific:		38–38–2	15–13–1	
Colorado State Rams (Western Athletic Conference) (1981)
1981	Colorado State	0–6 (Note: Sark Arslanian was fired after the first six games of the 1981 season. Caddas was appointed interim head coach for the remainder of the season. Colorado State finished the year 0–12 overall and 0–8 in conference play.)	0–5	9th
Colorado State:		0–6	0–5	
Total:		38–44–2		
