= Darryl Haley =

American football player (born 1961)

No. 68, 65, 74
- Positions: Offensive tackle, guard

Personal information
- Born: February 16, 1961 (age 65); Compton, California, U.S.
- Listed height: 6 ft 4 in (1.93 m)
- Listed weight: 269 lb (122 kg)

Career information
- High school: Locke (Los Angeles)
- College: Utah
- NFL draft: 1982: 2nd round, 55th overall pick

Career history
- New England Patriots (1982–1986); Tampa Bay Buccaneers (1987)*; San Diego Chargers (1987)*; Cleveland Browns (1987–1988); Green Bay Packers (1988); Cleveland Browns (1989)*
- * Offseason or practice squad member only

Career NFL statistics
- Games played: 79
- Games started: 25
- Stats at Pro Football Reference

Darryl Haley (born February 16, 1961) is an American former professional football player who was an offensive lineman in the National Football League (NFL). He played college football for the Utah Utes before spending six seasons in the NFL with the New England Patriots, the Cleveland Browns, and the Green Bay Packers. In 1995 Haley became an Ironman Triathlete. His completion of the race was dubbed by Mark Allen as one of the 40 greatest Ironman Moments and he is considered the largest athlete to ever complete the event at Kona.
