= Hawaii–Wyoming football rivalry =

College football rivalry

- Hawaii Rainbow Warriors Wyoming Cowboys
- Sport: Football
- First meeting: November 18, 1978; Hawaii, 27–22
- Latest meeting: September 26, 2026; Wyoming, 27–10
- Next meeting: 2027 in Honolulu
- Stadiums: Clarence T. C. Ching Athletics Complex; Honolulu, Hawaii, U.S. War Memorial Stadium; Laramie, Wyoming, U.S.
- Trophy: Paniolo Trophy

Statistics
- Total meetings: 30
- All-time series: Wyoming leads, 18–12
- Largest victory: Wyoming, 66–0 (1996)
- Longest win streak: Wyoming, 6 (1993–2013)
- Current win streak: Wyoming, 1 (2026–present)

Locations of Wyoming and Hawaii

The Hawaii–Wyoming football rivalry is an American college football rivalry between the Hawaii Rainbow Warriors and Wyoming Cowboys. The rivalry began in 1978, when Hawaii joined the Western Athletic Conference and was played annually until 1997, shortly before Wyoming departed from the WAC and joined the newly formed Mountain West Conference. The rivalry was renewed in 2012 when Hawaii joined the MW as a football-only affiliate member. The teams have met 30 times with Wyoming leading the series 18–12.

== Paniolo Trophy ==
The Paniolo Trophy was the trophy that went to the winner of the game. Paniolo is a Hawaiian word meaning “cowboy”, and the trophy featured a bronze cowboy on horseback, twirling a lariat. The trophy was donated to the two schools by the Wyoming Paniolo Society, a group of Hawaii residents with Wyoming roots. However, neither team was able to locate the original Paniolo Trophy before the rivalry was reinstated; this led to a new replacement trophy being created based on photographs of the original.

== Game results ==
Hawaii victories	Wyoming victories

No.	Date	Location	Winning team		Losing team	
1	November 18, 1978	Honolulu, HI	Hawaii	27	Wyoming	22
2	November 17, 1979	Honolulu, HI	Wyoming	21	Hawaii	13
3	September 27, 1980	Laramie, WY	Wyoming	45	Hawaii	20
4	October 10, 1981	Laramie, WY	Hawaii	14	Wyoming	9
5	October 2, 1982	Honolulu, HI	Wyoming	28	Hawaii	10
6	November 26, 1983	Honolulu, HI	Wyoming	31	Hawaii	13
7	November 3, 1984	Honolulu, HI	Hawaii	31	Wyoming	28
8	October 12, 1985	Laramie, WY	Hawaii	26	Wyoming	18
9	November 29, 1986	Honolulu, HI	Hawaii	35	Wyoming	19
10	November 28, 1987	Honolulu, HI	Wyoming	24	Hawaii	20
11	November 19, 1988	Honolulu, HI	No. 16 Wyoming	28	Hawaii	22
12	September 16, 1989	Laramie, WY	Wyoming	20	Hawaii	15
13	November 17, 1990	Honolulu, HI	Hawaii	38	Wyoming	17
14	August 31, 1991	Laramie, WY	Hawaii	32	Wyoming	17
15	November 21, 1992	Honolulu, HI	Hawaii	42	Wyoming	18
16	October 23, 1993	Laramie, WY	Wyoming	48	Hawaii	10
17	November 19, 1994	Honolulu, HI	Wyoming	13	Hawaii	10
18	September 16, 1995	Laramie, WY	Wyoming	52	Hawaii	6
19	September 14, 1996	Laramie, WY	Wyoming	66	Hawaii	0
20	September 13, 1997	Honolulu, HI	Wyoming	35	Hawaii	6
21	November 23, 2013	Laramie, WY	Wyoming	59	Hawaii	56^{OT}
22	October 11, 2014	Honolulu, HI	Hawaii	38	Wyoming	28
23	September 23, 2017	Laramie, WY	Wyoming	28	Hawaii	21^{OT}
24	October 6, 2018	Honolulu, HI	Hawaii	17	Wyoming	13
25	October 30, 2020	Laramie, WY	Wyoming	31	Hawaii	7
26	November 27, 2021	Laramie, WY	Hawaii	38	Wyoming	14
27	October 29, 2022	Honolulu, HI	Wyoming	27	Hawaii	20
28	November 18, 2023	Laramie, WY	Wyoming	42	Hawaii	9
29	November 29, 2025	Honolulu, HI	Hawaii	27	Wyoming	7
30	September 26, 2026	Laramie, WY	Wyoming	27	Hawaii	10
Series: Wyoming leads 18–12

== See also ==
- List of NCAA college football rivalry games
