= Fredericktown, Pennsylvania =

Unincorporated community in Pennsylvania, US

Fredericktown
- census-designated place
- Location within Pennsylvania Location within the United States
- Country: United States
- State: Pennsylvania
- County: Washington
- Established: 2010

Area
  - Total: 0.97 sq mi (2.50 km^{2})
  - Land: 0.97 sq mi (2.50 km^{2})
  - Water: 0 sq mi (0.00 km^{2})

Population (2020)
  - Total: 402
  - Estimate (2022): 296
  - Density: 415.8/sq mi (160.56/km^{2})
- Time zone: UTC-5 (Eastern (EST))
  - Summer (DST): UTC-4 (EDT)
- FIPS code: 42-27672

Fredericktown is a census-designated place located in East Bethlehem Township, Washington County in the state of Pennsylvania. The community was part of the Fredericktown-Millsboro CDP for the 2000 census, but was split into two separate CDPs for the 2010 census, the other community being Millsboro. Fredericktown is located in far southern Washington County, along Pennsylvania Route 88, which travels along the Monongahela River. As of the 2022 American Community Survey, the population was estimated to be 296.

== Demographics ==
Historical population
Census	Pop.	Note	%±
2010	403		—
2020	402		−0.2%
U.S. Decennial Census
