= List of Texas A&M Aggies football seasons =

This is a list of seasons completed by the Texas A&M Aggies college football program since the team's inception in 1894. The list documents season-by-season records, bowl game results, and conference records from 1915 to the present.

== Seasons ==
Year	Coach	Overall	Conference	Standing	Bowl/playoffs	Coaches^{#}	AP^{°}
F. Dudley Perkins (Independent) (1894)
1894	F. Dudley Perkins	1–1					
1895	No team						
Andrew M. Soule & Horace W. South (Independent) (1896)
1896	Soule & South	2–0–1					
C. W. Taylor (Independent) (1897)
1897	C. W. Taylor	1–2					
H. W. Williams (Independent) (1898)
1898	H. W. Williams	4–2					
W. A. Murray (Independent) (1899–1901)
1899	W. A. Murray	4–2					
1900	W. A. Murray	2–2–1					
1901	W. A. Murray	1–4					
J. E. Platt (Independent) (1902–1903)
1902	J. E. Platt	7–0–2					
J. E. Platt (SIAA) (1903–1904)
1903	J. E. Platt	7–3–1	0–1	T–15th			
1904	J. E. Platt	4–2	0–2	14th			
Walter E. Bachman (SIAA) (1905–1906)
1905	Walter E. Bachman	7–2	0–1	T–12th			
1906	Walter E. Bachman	6–1	2–1	5th			
Lester Larson (SIAA) (1907)
1907	Lester Larson	6–1–1	?	?			
Ned Merriam (SIAA) (1908)
1908	Ned Merriam	3–5	?	?			
Charley Moran (Independent) (1909–1911)
1909	Charley Moran	7–0–1					
1910	Charley Moran	8–1					
1911	Charley Moran	6–1					
Charley Moran (SIAA) (1912–1914)
1912	Charley Moran	8–1	2–0	2nd			
1913	Charley Moran	3–4–2	0–1–1	13th			
1914	Charley Moran	6–1–1	2–0	3rd			
Edwin Harlan (Southwest Conference) (1915–1916)
1915	Edwin Harlan	6–2	1–1	T–3rd			
1916	Edwin Harlan	6–3	1–2	5th			
Dana X. Bible (Southwest Conference) (1917)
1917	Dana X. Bible	8–0	3–0	1st			
D. V. Graves (Southwest Conference) (1918)
1918	D. V. Graves	6–1	1–1	T–3rd			
Dana X. Bible (Southwest Conference) (1919–1928)
1919	Dana X. Bible	10–0	4–0	1st			
1920	Dana X. Bible	6–1–1	5–1	2nd			
1921	Dana X. Bible	6–1–2	3–0–2	1st	W Dixie Classic		
1922	Dana X. Bible	5–4	2–2	T–3rd			
1923	Dana X. Bible	5–3–1	0–3–1	8th			
1924	Dana X. Bible	7–2–1	2–2–1	T–3rd			
1925	Dana X. Bible	7–1–1	4–1	1st			
1926	Dana X. Bible	5–3–1	1–3–1	6th			
1927	Dana X. Bible	8–0–1	4–0–1	1st			
1928	Dana X. Bible	5–4–1	1–3–1	6th			
Matty Bell (Southwest Conference) (1929–1933)
1929	Matty Bell	5–4	2–3	6th			
1930	Matty Bell	2–7	0–5	7th			
1931	Matty Bell	7–3	3–2	3rd			
1932	Matty Bell	4–4–2	1–2–2	4th			
1933	Matty Bell	6–3–1	2–2–1	4th			
Homer H. Norton (Southwest Conference) (1934–1947)
1934	Homer H. Norton	2–7–2	1–4–1	6th			
1935	Homer H. Norton	3–7	1–5	T–6th			
1936	Homer H. Norton	8–3–1	3–2–1	T–3rd			
1937	Homer H. Norton	5–2–2	2–2–2	T–4th			
1938	Homer H. Norton	4–4–1	2–3–1	5th			
1939	Homer H. Norton	11–0	6–0	1st	W Sugar		1
1940	Homer H. Norton	9–1	5–1	T–1st	W Cotton		6
1941	Homer H. Norton	9–2	5–1	1st	L Cotton		9
1942	Homer H. Norton	4–5–1	2–3–1	5th			
1943	Homer H. Norton	7–2–1	5–1	2nd	L Orange		
1944	Homer H. Norton	7–4	2–3	T–4th			
1945	Homer H. Norton	6–4	3–3	T–3rd			
1946	Homer H. Norton	4–6	4–2	T–3rd			
1947	Homer H. Norton	3–6–1	1–4–1	T–5th			
Harry Stiteler (Southwest Conference) (1948–1950)
1948	Harry Stiteler	0–9–1	0–5–1	7th			
1949	Harry Stiteler	1–8–1	0–5–1	7th			
1950	Harry Stiteler	7–4	3–3	T–3rd	W Presidential Cup		
Raymond George (Southwest Conference) (1951–1953)
1951	Raymond George	5–3–2	1–3–2	5th			
1952	Raymond George	3–6–1	1–4–1	6th			
1953	Raymond George	4–5–1	1–5	T–6th			
Bear Bryant (Southwest Conference) (1954–1957)
1954	Bear Bryant	1–9	0–6	7th			
1955	Bear Bryant	7–2–1	4–1–1	2nd		14	17
1956	Bear Bryant	9–0–1	6–0	1st	Ineligible (Note: The NCAA declared Texas A&M ineligible for a bowl game in 1956 due to recruiting violations in 1955.)	5	5
1957	Bear Bryant	8–3	4–2	3rd	L Gator	10	9
Jim Myers (Southwest Conference) (1958–1961)
1958	Jim Myers	4–6	2–4	T–5th			
1959	Jim Myers	3–7	0–6	7th			
1960	Jim Myers	1–6–3	0–4–3	7th			
1961	Jim Myers	4–5–1	3–4	4th			
Hank Foldberg (Southwest Conference) (1962–1964)
1962	Hank Foldberg	3–7	3–4	T–4th			
1963	Hank Foldberg	2–7–1	1–5–1	8th			
1964	Hank Foldberg	1–9	1–6	7th			
Gene Stallings (Southwest Conference) (1965–1971)
1965	Gene Stallings	3–7	1–6	T–7th			
1966	Gene Stallings	4–5–1	4–3	4th			
1967	Gene Stallings	7–4	6–1	1st	W Cotton		
1968	Gene Stallings	3–7	2–5	T–6th			
1969	Gene Stallings	3–7	2–5	T–6th			
1970	Gene Stallings	2–9	0–7	8th			
1971	Gene Stallings	5–6	4–3	4th			
Emory Bellard (Southwest Conference) (1972–1978)
1972	Emory Bellard	3–8	2–5	T–7th			
1973	Emory Bellard	5–6	3–4	6th			
1974	Emory Bellard	8–3	5–2	T–2nd		15	16
1975	Emory Bellard	10–2	6–1	T–1st	L Liberty	12	11
1976	Emory Bellard	10–2	6–2	3rd	W Sun	8	7
1977	Emory Bellard	8–4	6–2	3rd	L Bluebonnet		
1978	Emory Bellard (Note: The Aggies were led by head coach Emory Bellard in his seventh season through the first six games before his resignation on October 24. Tom Wilson was named interim coach and led the Aggies in their final six games.)	8–4	4–4	5th	W Hall of Fame Classic	18	19
Tom Wilson (Southwest Conference) (1978–1981)
1979	Tom Wilson	6–5	4–4	5th			
1980	Tom Wilson	4–7	3–5	T–6th			
1981	Tom Wilson	7–5	4–4	5th	W Independence		
Jackie Sherrill (Southwest Conference) (1982–1988)
1982	Jackie Sherrill	5–6	3–5	T–6th			
1983	Jackie Sherrill	5–5–1	4–3–1	T–3rd			
1984	Jackie Sherrill	6–5	3–5	7th			
1985	Jackie Sherrill	10–2	7–1	1st	W Cotton	7	6
1986	Jackie Sherrill	9–3	7–1	1st	L Cotton	12	13
1987	Jackie Sherrill	10–2	6–1	1st	W Cotton	9	10
1988	Jackie Sherrill	7–5	6–1	2nd (Note: Ineligible for conference championship and postseason bowl games due to NCAA sanctions.)	Ineligible		
R. C. Slocum (Southwest Conference) (1989–1995)
1989	R. C. Slocum	8–4	6–2	T–2nd	L John Hancock		20
1990	R. C. Slocum	9–3–1	5–2–1	T–3rd	W Holiday	13	15
1991	R. C. Slocum	10–2	8–0	1st	L Cotton	13	12
1992	R. C. Slocum	12–1	7–0	1st	L Cotton	6	7
1993	R. C. Slocum	10–2	7–0	1st	L Cotton	8	9
1994	R. C. Slocum	10–0–1	6–0–1	1st (Note: Texas A&M ineligible for championship and post-season due to NCAA sanctions.Due to NCAA sanctions, A&M was also banned from television for the 1994 season.)	Ineligible		8
1995	R. C. Slocum	9–3	5–2	T–2nd	W Alamo	15	15
R. C. Slocum (Big 12 Conference) (1996–2002)
1996	R. C. Slocum	6–6	4–4	3rd (South)			
1997	R. C. Slocum	9–4	6–2	1st (South)	L Cotton	21	20
1998	R. C. Slocum	11–3	7–1	1st (South)	L Sugar^{†}	13	11
1999	R. C. Slocum	8–4	5–3	T–2nd (South)	L Alamo	20	23
2000	R. C. Slocum	7–5	5–3	3rd (South)	L Independence		
2001	R. C. Slocum	8–4	4–4	T–3rd (South)	W Galleryfurniture.com		
2002	R. C. Slocum	6–6	3–5	5th (South)			
Dennis Franchione (Big 12 Conference) (2003–2007)
2003	Dennis Franchione	4–8	2–6	5th (South)			
2004	Dennis Franchione	7–5	5–3	T–3rd (South)	L Cotton		
2005	Dennis Franchione	5–6	3–5	4th (South)			
2006	Dennis Franchione	9–4	5–3	3rd (South)	L Holiday		
2007	Dennis Franchione (Note: Franchione resigned at the end of the regular season. Gary Darnell coached the bowl game.)	7–6	4–4	T–3rd (South)	L Alamo		
Mike Sherman (Big 12 Conference) (2008–2011)
2008	Mike Sherman	4–8	2–6	T–5th (South)			
2009	Mike Sherman	6–7	3–5	5th (South)	L Independence		
2010	Mike Sherman	9–4	6–2	T–1st (South)	L Cotton	21	19
2011	Mike Sherman (Note: A week after losing the rivalry game with Texas, on December 1, 2011, head coach Mike Sherman was fired by phone while on a recruiting trip in Houston, Texas. Defensive coordinator Tim DeRuyter was the interim head coach for their bowl game.)	7–6	4–5	T–6th	W Texas		
Kevin Sumlin (Southeastern Conference) (2012–2017)
2012	Kevin Sumlin	11–2	6–2	T–2nd (Western)	W Cotton	5	5
2013	Kevin Sumlin	9–4	4–4	4th (Western)	W Chick-fil-A	18	18
2014	Kevin Sumlin	8–5	3–5	6th (Western)	W Liberty		
2015	Kevin Sumlin	8–5	4–4	T–5th (Western)	L Music City		
2016	Kevin Sumlin	8–5	4–4	4th (Western)	L Texas		
2017	Kevin Sumlin (Note: On November 26, head coach Kevin Sumlin was fired. Interim head coach Jeff Banks led the Aggies in the Belk Bowl.)	7–6	4–4	T–4th (Western)	L Belk		
Jimbo Fisher (Southeastern Conference) (2018–2023)
2018	Jimbo Fisher	9–4	5–3	T–2nd (Western)	W Gator	16	16
2019	Jimbo Fisher	8–5	4–4	4th (Western)	W Texas		
2020	Jimbo Fisher	9–1	8–1	2nd (Western)	W Orange^{†}	4	4
2021	Jimbo Fisher	8–4	4–4	T–3rd (Western)	Gator (Note: A COVID-19 outbreak amongst the players and coaches forced Texas A&M to withdraw from the Gator Bowl)	25	
2022	Jimbo Fisher	5–7	2–6	7th (Western)			
2023	Jimbo Fisher	7–6	4–4	4th (Western)	L Texas		
Mike Elko (Southeastern Conference) (2024–present)
2024	Mike Elko	8–5	5–3	T–4th	L Las Vegas		
2025	Mike Elko	11–2	7–1	T–1st	L CFP First Round^{†}	8	8
Total:		797–511–48					
National championship Conference title Conference division title or championship game berth
^{†}Indicates Bowl Coalition, Bowl Alliance, BCS, or CFP / New Years' Six bowl.; ^{#}Rankings from final Coaches Poll.
