= List of Texas A&M Aggies head football coaches =

The Texas A&M Aggies football program is a college football team that represents Texas A&M University in the Western Division of the Southeastern Conference (SEC) in the National Collegiate Athletic Association (NCAA). The team has had 27 head coaches since it started playing organized football in 1894. Texas A&M University was a charter member of the Southwest Conference, joining in 1915, while then known as the Agricultural and Mechanical College of Texas or Texas A.M.C. Texas A&M became a charter member of the Big 12 in 1996 when the Southwest Conference disbanded. The Aggies subsequently left the Big 12 following the 2011 season and joined as the 13th member of the SEC effective for the 2012 season. The team nickname is the Aggies, a reference to the agricultural roots of the university. The Aggies have played in 1,244 games during their 122 completed seasons. In those seasons, twelve coaches have led Texas A&M to postseason bowl games: Dana X. Bible, Homer H. Norton, Robert Harry Stiteler, Bear Bryant, Gene Stallings, Emory Bellard, Tom Wilson, Jackie Sherrill, R. C. Slocum, Dennis Franchione, Mike Sherman, and Kevin Sumlin. Seven coaches have won conference championships with the Aggies: Bible, Norton, Bryant, Stallings, Bellard, Sherrill and Slocum. Bible and Norton are the only coaches to have won a national championship at Texas A&M.

Slocum is the all-time leader in games coached (172), total wins (123) and is tied with Norton for years coached (14). D. V. Graves has the highest winning percentage of any Aggies coach with a 6–1 record (.857) in his only year. Of coaches who served more than one season, Walter E. Bachman leads with a .813 winning percentage. Henry Foldberg is, in terms of winning percentage, the worst coach the Aggies have had (.217). Of the 27 Aggie coaches, six have been inducted in the College Football Hall of Fame: Bible, Madison Bell, Norton, Bryant, Stallings and Slocum. Slocum and Sumlin are the only coaches to have received any coach of the year accolades, with Slocum winning the Southwest Conference Coach of the Year award three years in a row, and Sumlin winning SEC Coach of the Year in 2012.

== Key ==
Key to symbols in coaches list
General		Overall		Conference		Postseason (Note: Although the first Rose Bowl Game was played in 1902, it has been continuously played since the 1916 game, and is recognized as the oldest bowl game by the NCAA. "—" indicates any season prior to 1916 when postseason games were not played.)	
No.	Order of coaches (Note: A running total of the number of head coaches, with coaches who served separate tenures being counted only once. Interim head coaches are represented with "Int" and are not counted in the running total. "—" indicates the team played but either without a coach or no coach is on record. "X" indicates an interim year without play.)	GC	Games coached	CW	Conference wins	PW	Postseason wins
DC	Division championships	OW	Overall wins	CL	Conference losses	PL	Postseason losses
CC	Conference championships	OL	Overall losses	CT	Conference ties	PT	Postseason ties
NC	National championships	OT	Overall ties (Note: Overtime rules in college football were introduced in 1996, making ties impossible in the period since.)	C%	Conference winning percentage		
†	Elected to the College Football Hall of Fame	O%	Overall winning percentage (Note: When computing the win–loss percentage, a tie counts as half a win and half a loss.)				

== Coaches ==
List of head football coaches showing season(s) coached, overall records, conference records, postseason records, championships and selected awards (Note: Statistics correct as of the end of the 2025 NCAA Division I FBS football season.)
No.	Name	Year(s)	Season(s)	GC	OW	OL	OT	O%	CW	CL	CT	C%	PW	PL	PT	CCs (Note: Texas A&M did not join a conference until 1915.)	NCs	
1	F. Dudley Perkins	1894	1	2	1	1	0	.500	—	—	—	—	—	—	—	—	—	—
2	Andrew M. Soule & Horace W. South	1896	1	3	2	0	1	.833	—	—	—	—	—	—	—	—	—	—
3	C. W. Taylor	1897	1	3	1	2	0	.333	—	—	—	—	—	—	—	—	—	—
4	H. W. Williams	1898	1	6	4	2	0	.667	—	—	—	—	—	—	—	—	—	—
5	W. A. Murray	1899–1901	3	16	7	8	1	.469	—	—	—	—	—	—	—	—	—	—
6	J. E. Platt	1902–1904	3	26	18	5	3	.750	—	—	—	—	—	—	—	—	—	—
7	Walter E. Bachman	1905–1906	2	16	13	3	0	.813	—	—	—	—	—	—	—	—	—	—
8	L. L. Larson	1907	1	8	6	1	1	.813	—	—	—	—	—	—	—	—	—	—
9	Ned Merriam	1908	1	10	4	5	1	.375	—	—	—	—	—	—	—	—	—	—
10	Charley Moran	1909–1914	6	48	37	8	3	.800	—	—	—	—	—	—	—	—	—	—
11	Edwin Harlan	1915–1916	2	18	13	5	0	.722	3	2	0	.600	—	—	—	—	—	—
12	Dana X. Bible^{†}	1917, 1919–1928	1, 10	100	72	19	9	.765	26	15	7	.615	1	0	0	5	2 — 1919, 1927	—
13	D. V. Graves	1918	1	7	6	1	0	.857	1	1	0	.500	—	—	—	—	—	—
14	Madison A. Bell^{†}	1929–1933	5	48	24	21	3	.531	8	14	3	.380	—	—	—	—	—	—
15	Homer H. Norton^{†}	1934–1947	14	144	82	53	9	.601	40	35	7	.530	2	2	0	3	1 – 1939	—
16	Harry Stiteler	1948–1950	3	31	8	21	2	.290	3	13	2	.222	1	0	0	—	—	—
17	Raymond George	1951–1953	3	30	12	14	4	.467	3	12	3	.250	—	—	—	—	—	—
18	Paul "Bear" Bryant^{†}	1954–1957	4	41	25	14	2	.634	14	9	1	.604	0	1	0	1	—	—
19	James A. Myers	1958–1961	4	40	12	24	4	.350	5	18	3	.250	—	—	—	—	—	—
20	Henry Foldberg	1962–1964	3	30	6	23	1	.217	5	15	1	.262	—	—	—	—	—	—
21	Gene Stallings^{†}	1965–1971	7	73	27	45	1	.377	19	30	0	.388	1	0	0	1	—	—
22	Emory Bellard (Note: Emory Ballard resigned in the middle of the 1978 season, after going 4–2 (1–2 in conference). Tom Wilson replaced him and finished the season 4–2 (3–2 in conference).)	1972–1978	7	75	48	27	0	.640	29	18	0	.617	1	2	0	1	—	—
23	Tom Wilson	1978–1981	4	40	21	19	0	.525	14	15	0	.483	2	0	0	—	—	—
24	Jackie Sherrill	1982–1988	7	81	52	28	1	.648	36	17	1	.676	2	1	0	3	—	—
25	R. C. Slocum^{†}	1989–2002	14	172	123	47	2	.721	78	28	2	.731	3	8	0	4	—	Southwest Conference Coach of the Year (1991, 1992, 1993)
26	Dennis Franchione	2003–2007	5	60	32	28	—	.533	19	21	—	.475	0	2	—	—	—	—
Int	Gary Darnell	2007	1	1	0	1	—	.000	0	0	—	.000	0	1	—	—	—	—
27	Mike Sherman	2008–2011	4	50	25	25	—	.500	15	18	—	.455	0	1	—	—	—	—
Int	Tim DeRuyter	2011	1	1	1	0	—	1.000	0	0	—	.000	1	0	—	—	—	—
28	Kevin Sumlin	2012–2017	6	65	44	21	—	.677	21	19	—	.525	3	2	—	—	—	SEC Coach of the Year (2012)
Int	Jeff Banks	2017	1	1	0	1	—	.000	0	0	—	.000	0	0	—	—	—	—
29	Jimbo Fisher	2018–2023	6	70	45	25	—	.643	27	21	—	.563	3	0	—	—	—	—
Int	Elijah Robinson	2023	1	3	1	2	—	.500	0	1	—	.000	0	0	—	—	—	—
30	Mike Elko	2024–present	2	26	19	7	—	0.731	12	4	—	0.750	0	2	—	—	—	—
