= Jack Little (American football) =

American football player and coach (1931–2016)

- Little with the Baltimore Colts in 1953

No. 72
- Position: Offensive tackle

Personal information
- Born: December 31, 1931; Corpus Christi, Texas, U.S.
- Died: November 26, 2016 (aged 84); Speegleville, Texas, U.S.
- Listed height: 6 ft 4 in (1.93 m)
- Listed weight: 235 lb (107 kg)

Career information
- High school: Roy Miller (Corpus Christi)
- College: Texas A&M (1949–1952)
- NFL draft: 1953: 5th round, 51st overall pick

Career history
- Baltimore Colts (1953–1954)

Awards and highlights
- First-team All-American (1951); 2× First-team All-SWC (1951, 1952)

Career NFL statistics
- Games played: 20
- Starts: 12
- Stats at Pro Football Reference

Jack Harold Little (December 31, 1931 – November 26, 2016) was an American professional football player and assistant football coach. After playing college football for Texas A&M, he played two seasons for the Baltimore Colts from 1953–54. He later served as a college assistant coach before working in Texas' parole system and finally retiring.

== Early life ==
Little was born in Corpus Christi, Texas. At the age of 12, his father died. His mother remarried when Jack was a senior in high school and moved to Washington, D.C. Jack and his older brother, Gene, remained in Corpus Christi. His brother received a scholarship to play football at Rice University.

In high school, Little was a second-team All-District football player.

== Playing career ==
Although Little enrolled at the University of Houston as a freshman, he did not attend any classes or played football there. Intimidated by the three-a-day practices that Houston held, Little and a high school friend escaped to Texas A&M. Little tried out for the football team, only because head coach Harry Stiteler was impressed by his toughness, determination, and intelligence.

Little lettered in football at Texas A&M from 1950–52. In 1950, he was part of an A&M squad that led the Southwest Conference (SWC) in total offense, and played in the Presidential Cup. Little made two All-America first-teams during his college years, one as a junior in 1951 and another as a senior in 1952. He also named an All-SWC lineman the same years. He also made the distinguished students list during his senior year for his academic performance. He was ultimately inducted into the Texas A&M Athletic Hall of Fame in 1982.

In the 1953 NFL draft, Little was selected in the fifth round (50th overall) by the Baltimore Colts. He played two seasons for the Colts before a back injury ended his playing career.

== Career after the NFL ==
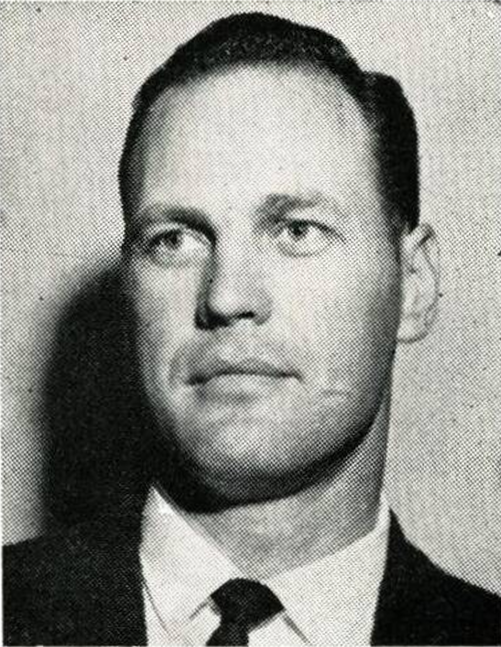
Little as an assistant coach at Baylor University, c. 1964

After his brief stint in the NFL, Little became an assistant football coach for Texas A&I (now Texas A&M–Kingsville). He was subsequently offered another assistant job by Baylor University head coach John Bridgers. Little accepted the position in 1963, and helped lead the Bears to an 8–3–0 record and a No. 20 finish in the national Coaches Poll. Little served as a coaching assistant at Baylor until 1968, when Bridgers was fired. Little remained for a brief period at Baylor, working in the school's outdoor education program.

Little later became an assistant for Sam Houston State University. He quit the coaching profession after another back injury. He then worked for Texas' parole system for 17 years before retiring in 1996.

== Personal life and death ==
Little married his wife Nancy in 1950, which was at the end of his freshman year. They soon had the first of their two daughters by the time he left Texas A&M. His oldest daughter eventually received a doctorate degree from the school. His brother, Gene Little played football at Rice University and was drafted by the Giants, but never played as he joined the US Marines. Jack's nephew's son, Walker Little, was drafted in the second round of the 2021 NFL draft by the Jacksonville Jaguars after playing college football at Stanford. His niece's son, Jack Engelmann (his namesake) played college baseball as a pitcher for the University of Louisiana-Monroe.

Jack Little died in Speegleville, Texas on November 26, 2016, at the age of 84.
