= Andrew Soule =

Andrew Soule may refer to:

- Andy Soule (born 1980), American Nordic skier
- Andrew M. Soule (1872–1934), American football coach and college dean
