= James Platt =

James Platt may refer to:

- James Platt (MP) (1823–1857), Liberal MP for Oldham
- James H. Platt Jr. (1837–1894), U.S. Representative from Virginia
- James Perry Platt (1851–1913), American judge
- J. E. Platt (James Edward Platt) (born 1878), American college football coach
- Jim Platt (born 1952), Northern Irish football player
- Jim Platt (basketball) (born 1952), assistant coach with the Army Black Knights
