= Presidential Cup =

The Presidential Cup may refer to:

- Turkish Super Cup, previously known as the Presidential Cup
- Turkish Basketball Presidential Cup
- Presidential Cup Bowl
