= Speegleville, Texas =

Unincorporated community in Texas, US

Coordinates: 31°33′22″N 97°15′09″W

Speegleville is an unincorporated community located in McLennan County in Central Texas. Speegleville is a suburb in the Waco Metropolitan Statistical Area. The community is located along Texas State Highway 6 around 8 miles to the west of the City of Waco on the western edge of Lake Waco. The population of Speegleville was 111 at the time of the 2000 census.

As of 2010 Speegleville continued to maintain a volunteer fire department, elementary school, and 3 churches. Speegleville Park is a US Army Corps of Engineers maintained recreational area with a public beach and campgrounds located on Lake Waco.

Speegleville was named for Israel Washington Speegle, a blacksmith and farmer who came to the area from Jasper County, Missouri, in 1849. A Baptist congregation, which was organized in 1859 as the Pleasant Grove Church, shared a building with the local school. The Speegleville post office operated from 1879 until 1929. Speegle was the first postmaster. Speegleville had a population of twenty-five in the mid-1880s and fifty by the early 1890s. In 1896 the community had two general stores, and the principal occupation of area residents was stock raising. That year the Speegleville school district had seventy-seven students and one teacher.

Construction of Waco Dam in the late 1920s forced several residents to move their homes or businesses. Residents were forced to move again in the late 1950s and early 1960s because of the construction of the new Lake Waco dam. The original townsite was destroyed, and Speegleville became a scattered collection of houses instead of an organized town.

The Speegleville Independent School District was consolidated with the Midway Independent School District in 1980. Population estimates for the community remained at 111 from 1900 through 2000.

== Links ==
- Handbook of Texas Online entry for Speegleville, Texas
- Speegleville Methodist Church Homepage
- Speegleville Elementary
