= Horace W. South =

American football coach and educator

Biographical details
- Born: January 11, 1877; Brazos County, Texas, U.S.
- Died: May 20, 1954 (aged 77); Laredo, Texas, U.S.

Coaching career (HC unless noted)
- 1896: Texas A&M

Head coaching record
- Overall: 2–0–1

Horace Walter South (January 11, 1877 – May 20, 1954) was an American college football coach and educator. He served as co-head football coach with Andrew M. Soule at Texas A&M University in 1896, compiling a record of 2–0–1. A native of Brazos County, Texas, South attended Sam Houston Normal Institute—now known as Sam Houston State University—and the University of Virginia. He taught at Texas A&M from 1896 to 1904. He later purchased an interest in Allen Academy in Bryan, Texas, where he remained in 1911. After working the oil business in Mexico, he taught in public schools in Houston, Texas. He died on May 20, 1954, in Laredo, Texas.

South was a student at the University of Chicago in 1904.

== Head coaching record ==
| Year | Team | Overall | Conference | Standing | Bowl/playoffs |
|---|---|---|---|---|---|
Texas A&M Aggies (Independent) (1896)
| 1896 | Texas A&M | 2–0–1 | | | |
| Texas A&M: | | 2–0–1 | | | |
| Total: | | 1–1 | | | |
