= Raymond George =

American football player and coach (1918–1995)

Ray George
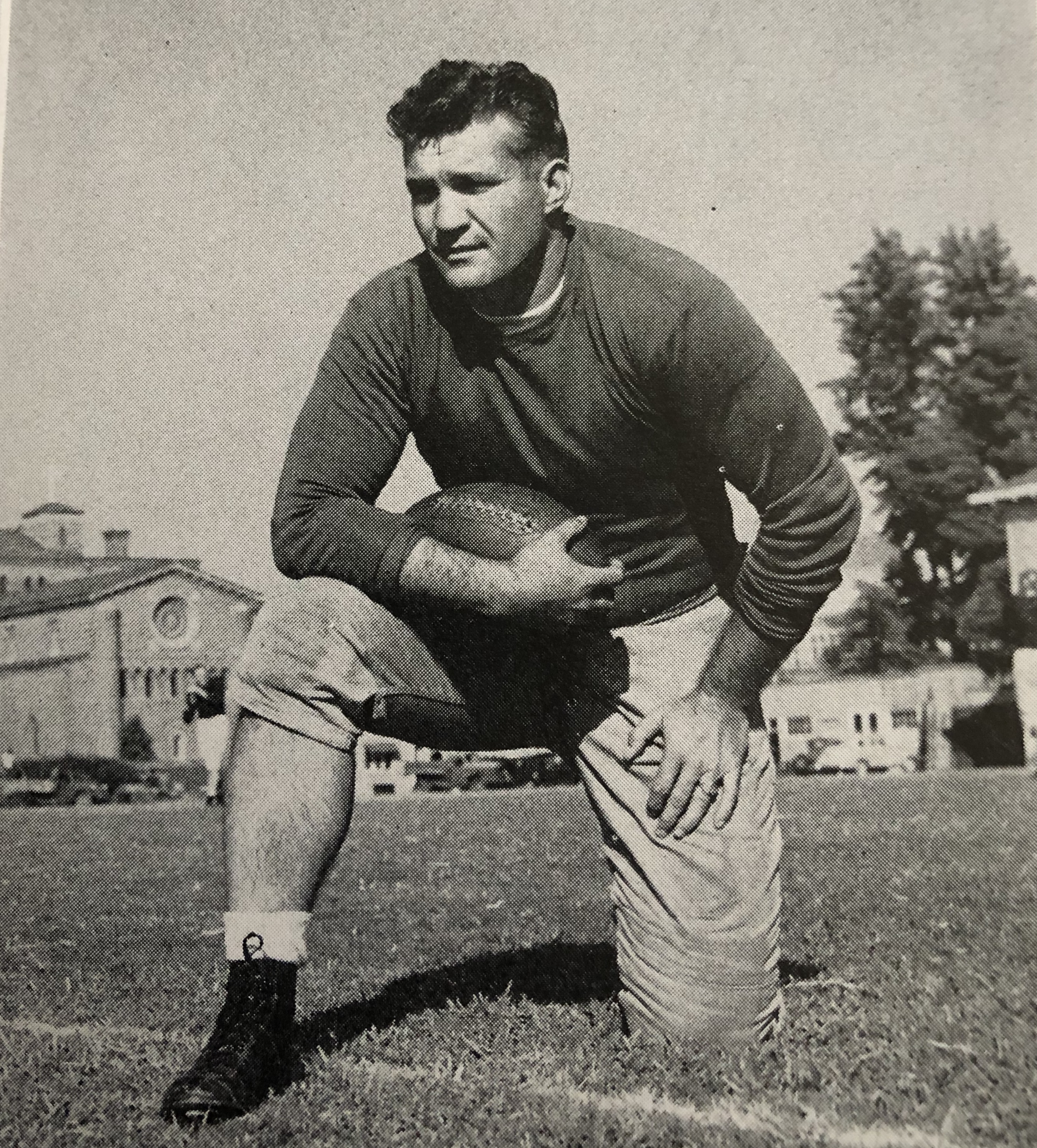
- George at USC, c. 1948

No. 14, 23, 19
- Position: Tackle

Personal information
- Born: January 17, 1916; St. Louis, Missouri, U.S.
- Died: January 12, 1995 (aged 78); Costa Mesa, California, U.S.
- Listed height: 6 ft 0 in (1.83 m)
- Listed weight: 229 lb (104 kg)

Career information
- High school: Loyola (Los Angeles, California)
- College: USC (1935-1938)
- NFL draft: 1939: 10th round, 87th overall pick

Career history

Playing
- Detroit Lions (1939); Philadelphia Eagles (1940); Los Angeles Bulldogs (1945)

Coaching
- Porterville HS (CA) (1941) Head coach; USC (1946-1950) Line coach; Texas A&M (1951-1953) Head coach; USC (1958-1964, 1972-1974) Assistant coach

Awards and highlights
- Pro Bowl (1939)

Career NFL statistics
- Games played: 13
- Stats at Pro Football Reference

Head coaching record
- Career: 12–14–4 (.467)

Raymond Edward George (January 7, 1918 – January 12, 1995) was an American football player and coach. He played college football at the University of Southern California (USC) and professionally in the National Football League (NFL) with the Detroit Lions and Philadelphia Eagles. George was the head football coach at Texas A&M University from 1951 to 1953, compiling a record of 12–14–4. He also served three stints as an assistant football coach at his alma mater, USC.

== Playing career ==
George played college football at the University of Southern California as a tackle under Hall of Fame coach Howard Jones from 1936 to 1938. His senior season was successful, as the Trojans upset both top-ranked rival Notre Dame, 13–0, and previously unbeaten and unscored-upon Duke, 7–3, in the 1939 Rose Bowl.

In 1939, George was the second USC player ever drafted by an NFL team; he taken by the Detroit Lions as the 87th overall pick. He played two years of professional football, in 1939 with the Lions and in 1940 with the Philadelphia Eagles.

== Coaching career ==
After playing football George returned to California and became a coach at Porterville High School in Porterville, California before joining the military in 1942 and ultimately reaching the rank of lieutenant. He returned from the service to USC where he acted as a line coach from 1946 to 1950.

=== Texas A&M ===
George was the 17th head coach of the Texas A&M Aggies in College Station, Texas. He was head coach from 1951 until the completion of the 1953 season. His teams produced a total record of 12 wins, 14 losses, and 4 ties. Among his wins were victories over Bud Wilkinson's Oklahoma Sooners, Henry Russell Sanders' UCLA Bruins and Bear Bryant's Kentucky Wildcats. Bryant succeeded George at Texas A&M.

=== Return to USC ===
After leaving Texas A&M, George went into private business. He persuaded to return to coaching by USC head coach Don Clark in 1958. For five years, George served as John McKay's senior assistant, where he was a part of the 1962 championship team.

George retired after the championship, reentering the private business realm and serving as vice president of sales for Transamerica Title Insurance Company for six years. He returned to USC again in January 1971, this time as both an assistant athletic director and assistant football coach. He was an assistant on both the 1972 and 1974 national championship teams before focusing solely on working as an assistant athletic director, retiring from that position in 1985.

George died on January 12, 1995, at age 78, of complications from a stroke, in Costa Mesa, California. In 2001, he was inducted into the USC Athletic Hall of Fame.

== Head coaching record ==
=== College ===
| Year | Team | Overall | Conference | Standing | Bowl/playoffs |
|---|---|---|---|---|---|
Texas A&M Aggies (Southwest Conference) (1951–1953)
| 1951 | Texas A&M | 5–3–2 | 1–3–2 | T–5th | |
| 1952 | Texas A&M | 3–6–1 | 1–4–1 | 6th | |
| 1953 | Texas A&M | 4–5–1 | 1–5 | T–6th | |
| Texas A&M: | | 12–14–4 | 3–12–3 | | |
| Total: | | 12–14–4 | | | |
