= Edwin Harlan =

American lawyer

Biographical details
- Born: May 12, 1886; Maryland, U.S.
- Died: August 7, 1939 (aged 53); Bel Air, Maryland, U.S.

Playing career

Football
- 1905–1907: Princeton

Baseball
- 1906–1908: Princeton
- Positions: Halfback, quarterback (football)

Coaching career (HC unless noted)

Football
- 1910: Princeton (field coach)
- 1911: Johns Hopkins
- 1913–1914: Pittsburgh (assistant)
- 1915–1916: Texas A&M

Baseball
- 1912: Johns Hopkins

Head coaching record
- Overall: 17–10 (football)

Accomplishments and honors

Awards
- Consensus All-American (1907)

Edwin Hanson Webster "Jigger" Harlan (May 12, 1886 – August 7, 1939) was an American college football and college baseball player and coach, and attorney. He played football at Princeton University and was a consensus first-team selection to the 1907 College Football All-America Team. Harlan coached the Johns Hopkins University football and baseball teams in 1912. He served as the head football coach at Texas A&M University from 1915 to 1916.

== Biography ==
Harlan was born in Maryland in 1886. His father, William H. Harlan, was a judge in Bel Air, Maryland. Harlan graduated from Episcopal High School in Alexandria, Virginia, in 1904.

Harlan enrolled in Princeton University in 1904. He played for the Princeton Tigers football and baseball teams. He was captain of the baseball team, and he was selected as a consensus first-team halfback on the 1907 College Football All-America Team.

Harlan graduated from Princeton in 1908 and enrolled at the University of Maryland School of Law, receiving his degree in 1911. He served as the football and baseball coach at Johns Hopkins University in 1912. He also practiced law in Harford County, Maryland, serving at various times as the city attorney for Bel Air, Maryland, and as counsel to the Harford County Boards of Education and Elections Supervisors.

Harlan coached football at Princeton and the University of Pittsburgh. He was appointed as the head football coach at Texas A&M University in 1915.

Harlan died in 1939 at Bel Air, Maryland, after a lengthy illness.

== Head coaching record ==
=== Football ===
Year	Team	Overall	Conference	Standing	Bowl/playoffs
Johns Hopkins Blue Jays (Independent) (1911)
1911	Johns Hopkins	4–5			
Johns Hopkins:		4–5			
Texas A&M Aggies (Southwest Conference) (1915–1916)
1915	Texas A&M	6–2	1–1	T–3rd	
1916	Texas A&M	6–3	2–1	T–3rd	
Texas A&M:		12–5	3–2		
Total:		17–10			
