= Andrew M. Soule =

American football coach and college dean

Biographical details
- Born: July 8, 1872 near Hamilton, Ontario, Canada
- Died: April 16, 1934 (aged 61); Atlanta, Georgia, U.S.

Coaching career (HC unless noted)
- 1896: Texas A&M

Head coaching record
- Overall: 2–0–1

Andrew MacNarin Soule (July 8, 1872 – April 16, 1934) was an American college football coach and university dean. He served as the volunteer, co-head football coach with Horace W. South at Texas A&M University in 1896, compiling a record of 2–0–1.

Soule spent his early career working for agriculture extension departments at the University of Missouri and the University of Tennessee, and he also served as the dean of the College of Agriculture at Virginia Tech in 1904. In 1907, he became the president of the College of Agriculture at the University of Georgia. Among Soule's notable contributions is his research on the boll weevil.

Soule was born near Hamilton, Ontario on July 8, 1872. He died on April 16, 1934, at Crawford Long Hospital in Atlanta, after suffering from pneumonia following an operation two months prior.

== Head coaching record ==
Year	Team	Overall	Conference	Standing	Bowl/playoffs
Texas A&M Aggies (Independent) (1896)
1896	Texas A&M	2–0–1			
Texas A&M:		2–0–1			
Total:		1–1			
