= F. Dudley Perkins =

American football player and coach (1875–1960)

Biographical details
- Born: August 1, 1875; McKinney, Texas, U.S.
- Died: December 31, 1960 (aged 85); McKinney, Texas, U.S.

Playing career

Football
- 1894: Texas A&M
- 1896–1897: Texas A&M

Baseball
- 1895: Texas A&M
- Positions: End, fullback (football); Second baseman (baseball)

Coaching career (HC unless noted)

Football
- 1894: Texas A&M

Head coaching record
- Overall: 1–1

Frank Dudley Perkins (August 1, 1875 – December 31, 1960) was an American college football player and coach. He served as the player-coach for the 1894 Texas A&M Aggies football team. He was also a second baseman on the school's baseball team in 1895.

Perkins was born on August 1, 1875, in McKinney, Texas. He was a businessman and civil leader there before his death on December 31, 1960.

== Head coaching record ==
Year	Team	Overall	Conference	Standing	Bowl/playoffs
Texas A&M Aggies (Independent) (1894)
1894	Texas A&M	1–1			
Texas A&M:		1–1			
Total:		1–1			
