= Texas A&M Aggies football =

Program representing Texas A&M University in American football

2026 Texas A&M Aggies football team
- First season: 1894; 132 years ago
- Athletic director: Trev Alberts
- General manager: Derek Miller
- Head coach: Mike Elko; 3rd season, 23–14 (.622)
- Location: College Station, Texas
- Stadium: Kyle Field (capacity: 102,733)
- NCAA division: Division I FBS
- Conference: SEC
- Colors: Maroon and white
- All-time record: 801–516–48 (.604)
- CFP record: 0–1 (.000)
- Bowl record: 20–24 (.455)

National championships
- Claimed: 1919, 1927, 1939

College Football Playoff appearances
- 2025

Conference championships
- SWC: 1917, 1919, 1921, 1925, 1927, 1939, 1940, 1941, 1956, 1967, 1975, 1985, 1986, 1987, 1991, 1992, 1993 Big 12: 1998

Division championships
- Big 12 South: 1997, 1998, 2010
- Heisman winners: John David Crow – 1957; Johnny Manziel – 2012
- Consensus All-Americans: 33
- Rivalries: Texas (rivalry); LSU (rivalry); Baylor (rivalry); Arkansas (rivalry); South Carolina (rivalry); Missouri (rivalry); Texas Tech (rivalry); TCU (rivalry)

Uniforms
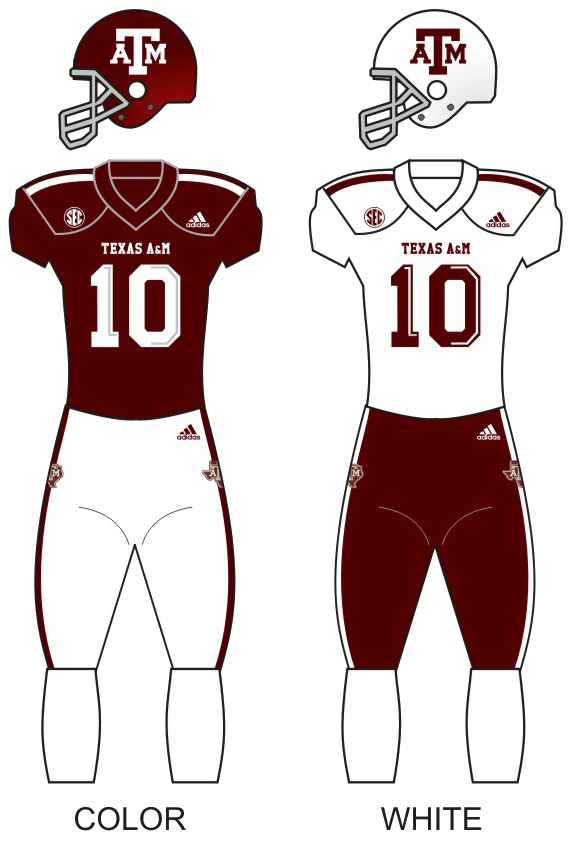
- Fight song: Aggie War Hymn
- Mascot: Reveille
- Marching band: Fightin' Texas Aggie Band
- Outfitter: Adidas
- Website: 12thman.com

The Texas A&M Aggies football program represents Texas A&M University in the sport of American football. The Aggies compete in the Football Bowl Subdivision (FBS) of the National Collegiate Athletic Association (NCAA) and are a member of the Southeastern Conference (SEC). Texas A&M football claims three national titles and 18 conference titles. The team plays all home games at Kyle Field, a 102,733-person capacity outdoor stadium on the university campus.

== History ==
=== Early history (1894–1964) ===
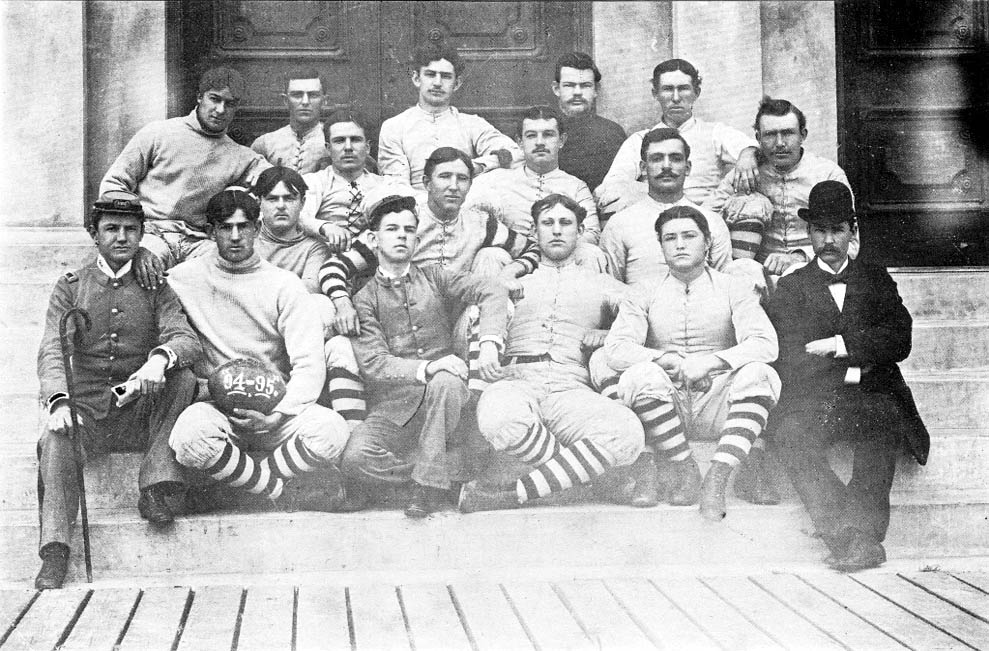
Texas A&M team of 1894

Texas A&M first fielded a football team in 1894, under the direction of head coach F. Dudley Perkins. The team compiled a 1–1 record. W. A. Murray served as A&M's head coach from 1899 to 1901, compiling a record of 7–8–1.

From 1902 to 1904, J. E. Platt served as A&M's head coach, his teams compiling a record of 18–5–3. From 1909 to 1914, A&M compiled a 38–8–4 record under head coach Charley Moran. Moran's 1909 team finished undefeated, and all but one of Moran's other seasons the Aggies only lost one game each year. Under head coach Edwin Harlan, the Aggies compiled a record of 12–5 in two seasons and joined the Southwest Conference.

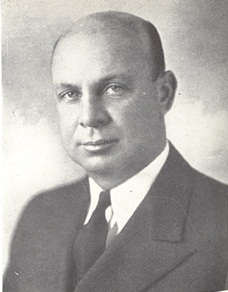
Coach Bible

Dana X. Bible became Texas A&M's head coach in 1919, leaving LSU, and under his tutelage the Aggies compiled a record of 72–19–9 in ten seasons. Bible's 1919 Texas A&M Aggies football team, which was undefeated, untied, and outscored its opposition 275–0, was retroactively named a national champion by the Billingsley Report and the National Championship Foundation. In the 1922 Dixie Classic, Bible made his most visible and lasting impression in his A&M career when he began the Twelfth Man Tradition. Bible had a roster of only eighteen players, who had to play both offense and defense against the heavily favored Centre College. He lost three players to injuries early in the game, but the Aggies took the lead. Fearing more injuries and a possibility of having to forfeit the game for lack of men, Bible called upon a reserve halfback, E. King Gill, who was in the press box running stats for the team, to suit up and be ready if needed. The Aggies wouldn't need Gill's help to win, but since then A&M students stand throughout football games to show their willingness to play if needed. Bible departed the Aggies after the 1928 season to accept the Nebraska head coaching position.

After Bible's departure, A&M brought in Matty Bell from TCU to lead the Aggies football program. Under Bell's tutelage, the Aggies compiled a record of 24–21–3. However, the Aggies did not play up to the standards set by Dana Bible's tenure, and Bell left for SMU after five seasons. Homer Norton was hired away from Centenary to replace Bell in 1934. A&M enjoyed great successes under Norton. The 1939 Texas A&M team went 11–0, beating Tulane in the Sugar Bowl, and was named a national champion. Norton's record at Texas A&M was 82–53–9, giving him the second most wins of any coach in Texas A&M Aggies football history. Among the many stars that Norton developed were John Kimbrough and Joe Routt. Norton was fired in 1947 when his team went 3–6–1 and lost to archrival University of Texas for the eighth straight year.

In December 1947, Harry Stiteler was promoted from running backs coach to head coach for the Texas A&M football team following the firing of Homer Norton. In Stiteler's first season as head coach, the Aggies failed to win a game, accumulating a record of 0–9–1. For the 1949 season, the Aggies won only one game and had a record of 1–8–1. Despite the poor record in his first two seasons, Stiteler developed a reputation as a good recruiter. In 1950, Stiteler turned the program around with a 7–4 record, including impressive wins over Arkansas (42–13) and SMU (25–20) and a 40–20 win over Georgia in the Presidential Cup Bowl at Baltimore. The 1950 team had the best record of any Texas A&M football team in the first decade after World War II (1945–1954). In December 1950, Stiteler reported that he had been attacked and beaten by a stranger near the Shamrock Hotel in Houston, where Stiteler had been scheduled to address a group of Texas A&M alumni. Stiteler tried to downplay the incident, but the press reported Stiteler declined to provide details to the police and that there were conflicting versions as to what had happened. The San Antonio Light reported the incident under a banner headline, "MYSTERY SHROUDS STITELER BEATING." In March 1951, Stiteler admitted that he had misrepresented the facts concerning the assault. He reported that he had known his attacker and "the affair was a personal one." Embarrassed, Stiteler submitted his letter of resignation to the President of Texas A&M upon revealing the true facts concerning "my affair in Houston." Following the resignation, the members of the football team issued a statement in support of their former coach:

"We believe that whatever happened to Mr. Stiteler was a personal matter and it should have remained that. A lot of us boys came to A. and M. in 1948 not because A. and M. had won games but simply because of Harry Stiteler and his character. He has never ceased to set us that same example in the years we have played and worked for him."

In three years as the head coach at Texas A&M, Stiteler compiled a record of 8–21–2. Raymond George, previously USC's defensive line coach, was hired as the 17th head coach of the Texas A&M Aggies after the Stiteler scandal. He served as head coach for three seasons, from 1951 to 1953, during which time the Aggies produced a total record of 12–14–4. Among A&M's notable wins during this time period were victories over Bud Wilkinson's Oklahoma Sooners, Henry Russell Sanders' UCLA Bruins and Bear Bryant's Kentucky Wildcats. George resigned as the Aggies head coach following the 1953 season. In 1994 as a result of the NCAA findings of major violations of NCAA rules in this case, Texas A&M became one of three universities to receive as many as seven public penalties since 1952. Between 1956 and 1977, the university was placed on probation three times and publicly reprimanded once for major violations of NCAA rules. This era began a series of NCAA rules violations that continued to 2020.

Legendary coach Bear Bryant arrived in College Station after successful head coaching tenures at Maryland and Kentucky, signing a contract worth $15,000 per year. The Aggies suffered through a grueling 1–9 record in Bryant's first season, which began with the infamous training camp in Junction, Texas, during which time many Aggie football players quit the team. The "survivors" were given the name "Junction Boys." Two years later, Bryant led the team to the Southwest Conference championship, despite being on probation, with a 34–21 victory over Texas in Austin. The following year, star running back John David Crow won the Heisman Trophy and the Aggies were in title contention until they lost to Rice Owls. Bryant attempted to integrate the all-white Texas A&M squad. "We'll be the last football team in the Southwest Conference to integrate," he was told by a Texas A&M official. "Well," Bryant replied, "then that's where we're going to finish in football." After the 1957 season, having compiled an overall 25–14–2 record at A&M, Bryant left for Alabama, his alma mater, where he would cement his legacy as one of the greatest, if not the greatest, college football coach of all time.

A&M next turned to Iowa State head coach Jim Myers for its head coaching position. Under Myers, the Aggies struggled mightily, compiling a 12–24–4 record. The Aggies failed to win more than four games in a single season. The fallout that ensued from fans, boosters and the administration led Myers to join Tom Landry's Dallas Cowboys staff as an assistant coach. Hank Foldberg was hired as the Aggies head coach after Myers' departure, and brought with him high hopes that Aggie success would return. However, the struggles remained, in the form of a 6–23–1 record in three seasons. Foldberg was replaced after the 1964 season.

=== Gene Stallings era (1965–1971) ===
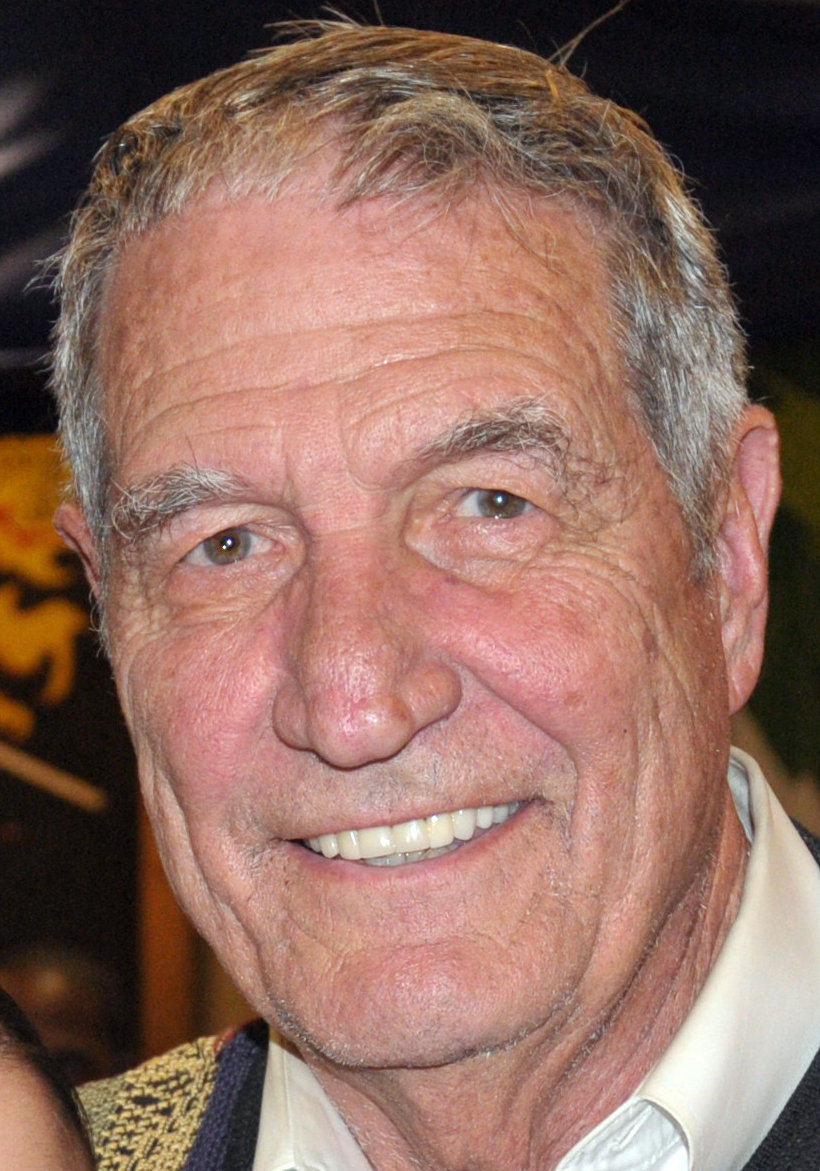
Coach Stallings

Fresh off helping Bear Bryant and Alabama win the 1964 national title as an assistant coach, Gene Stallings, one of the "Junction Boys", was named the head coach of his alma mater at the age of 29. The Aggies struggles persisted under Stallings. Texas A&M compiled a record of 27–45–1 in Stallings' seven seasons. However, the Aggies won the Southwest Conference in 1967, Stallings' only winning season at A&M. At the end of that season, A&M beat Alabama in the Cotton Bowl. During Stallings' tenure, the Aggies won the Southwest Conference in 1967, Stallings' only winning season at A&M. At the end of that season Stallings led Texas A&M to a victory over Alabama and mentor Bear Bryant in the Cotton Bowl, a victory where Coach Bryant carried Coach Stallings off the field. With the university only recently going co-ed, its military focus and the ongoing war in Vietnam, A&M struggled to recruit against its Southwest Conference rivals. He was fired at A&M following the 1971 season, but, like his mentor Bryant, would go on to become Alabama's head coach in the 1990s and solidify a Hall of Fame career there, winning a national championship in 1992.

=== Emory Bellard era (1972–1978) ===
Texas offensive coordinator Emory Bellard became the Aggies' head coach in 1972 and brought with him the wishbone offense. In his seven years at Texas A&M, he finished with a record of 48–27 and three top-15 finishes. Acting as his own offensive coordinator, Bellard hired former high school football coaches to assist him as backfield coaches. Bellard's first two seasons at Texas A&M were difficult, as his Aggies finished 3–8 and 5–6, respectively. In 1974, with a pair of his own recruiting classes suited to run the wishbone formation, the Aggies went 8–3, then followed it up with two 10–2 seasons, including a pair of wins over Texas and three consecutive bowl game appearances. After starting the 1978 season 4–0, Bellard resigned mid-season after two consecutive losses: 33–0 to Houston and 24–6 to Baylor.

=== Tom Wilson era (1978–1981) ===
Tom Wilson was promoted from offensive coordinator to head coach of the Aggies following Bellard's resignation. The Aggies enjoyed moderate success under Wilson's tutelage, compiling a record of 21–19 and an Independence Bowl victory in 1981. However, the mediocrity did not sit well with the administration, and Wilson was fired after the 1981 season.

=== Jackie Sherrill era (1982–1988) ===
On January 19, 1982, Jackie Sherrill was hired away from Pittsburgh by A&M as the replacement for Tom Wilson, signing a record six-year contract over $1.7 million. Sherrill was the head coach of the Texas A&M Aggies for seven seasons, from 1982 to 1988. While head coach at A&M, Sherrill started the tradition of the "12th Man Kickoff Team", this tradition is still observed by A&M today only in a significantly scaled back form, including a single walk-on rather than an entire return team unit. In Sherrill's seven seasons, A&M compiled a 52–28–1 record. A&M also won three consecutive Southwest Conference championships during Sherrill's tenure, in 1985, 1986 and 1987. As a result, the Aggies played in the Cotton Bowl Classic at the end of each season, defeating Auburn 36–16 on January 1, 1986 and Notre Dame 35–10 on January 1, 1988, and losing to Ohio State 28–12 on January 1, 1987. He is also one of the few coaches to leave Texas A&M with a winning record against the Longhorns, winning his last five against Texas after losing his first two. However, he only won two out of seven games versus Texas A&M's other conference rival, Arkansas, in that same time span. In 1988, Texas A&M was put under probation by the NCAA for a period of two years. Violations included improper employment, extra benefits, unethical conduct and lack of institutional control. Sherrill was not personally found guilty of any infractions. However, in December 1988, Sherrill resigned.

=== R. C. Slocum era (1989–2002) ===
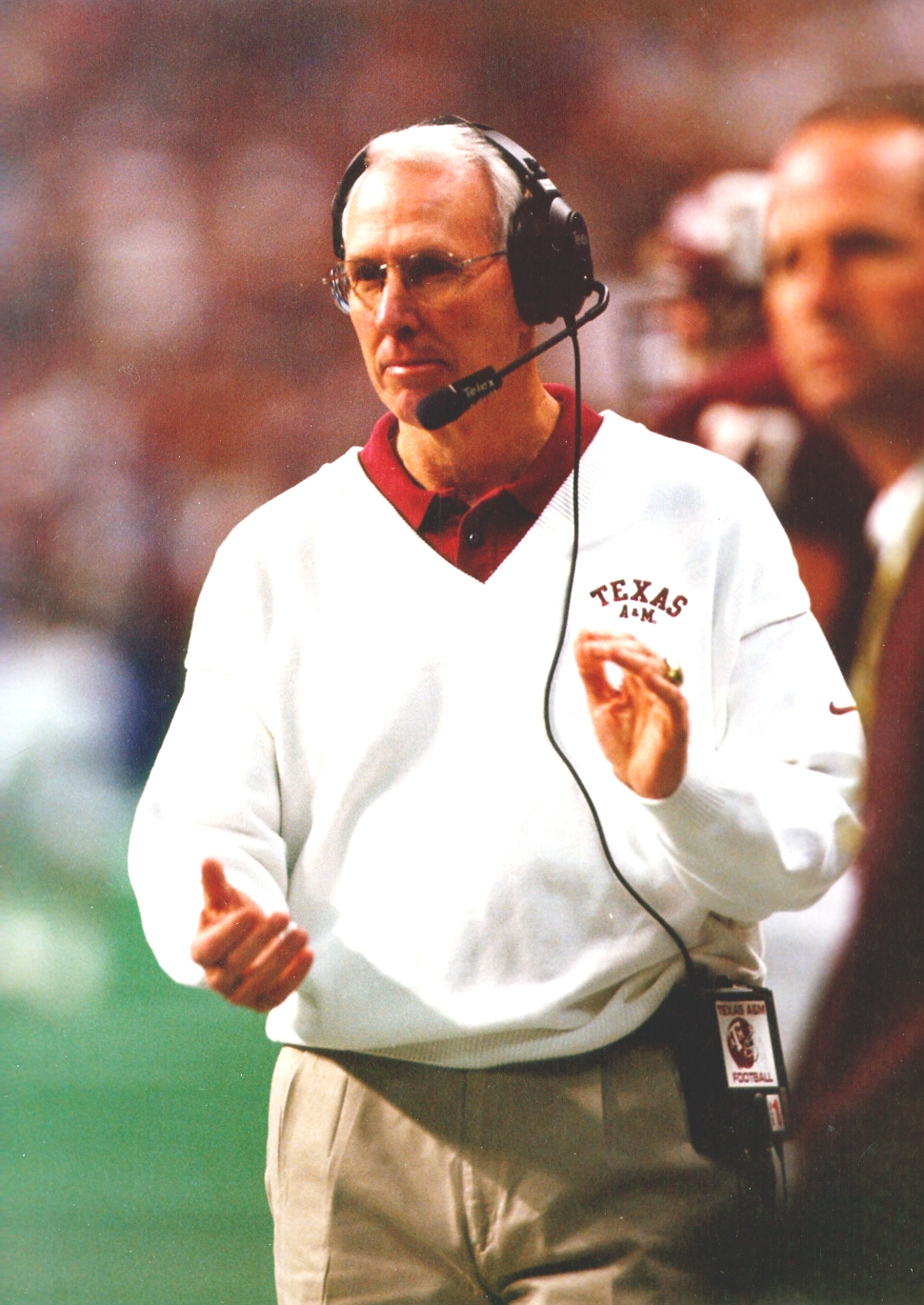
Coach Slocum

In December 1988, R.C. Slocum was promoted from defensive coordinator and named head coach of the Aggies. During Slocum's 14 years as head coach, the Aggies compiled a record of 123–47–2, making Slocum the winningest coach in Texas A&M history. During his career, Slocum never had a losing season and won four conference championships, including the Big 12 (the Southwest Conference was renamed in 1996) title in 1998 and two Big 12 South Championships, 1997 1998. Additionally, he led the Aggies to become the first school in the Southwest Conference history to post three consecutive perfect conference seasons and actually went four consecutive seasons without a conference loss. Slocum reached 100 wins faster than any other active coach.

A&M's Kyle Field became one of the hardest places for opponents to play during Slocum's tenure, losing only 12 games at home in 14 years. For over a year, A&M held the longest home-winning streak in the nation, losing in 1989 and not again until late in 1995. In the 1990s, A&M lost only four times at Kyle Field. Slocum was named SWC Coach of the Year three times during his tenure as head coach. A&M's "Wrecking Crew" defense led the Southwest Conference in four statistical categories from 1991 through 1993 and led the nation in total defense in 1991. Over 50 Texas A&M players were drafted into the NFL during Slocum's career as head coach.

Slocum inherited an Aggie football program that had just finished 7–5 and under severe NCAA sanctions, and cleaned it up quickly. He was quoted in 2002 as saying "I wouldn't trade winning another game or two for my reputation as a person. I've said from day one I'm going to do things the way I think they should be done. There were those who said, `If you don't cheat, you're pretty naive. You can't win that way.' Well, we're going to find out. That's the way we're going to do it. I can walk away and look myself in the mirror and say, 'We did it the right way.' After 14 years as head coach of the Aggies, Slocum was asked to resign in 2002 following only the second non-winning season of his career. He immediately assumed a position as special adviser to Texas A&M president Robert Gates.

=== Dennis Franchione era (2003–2007) ===
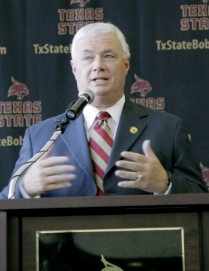
Coach Francione

A&M turned to Alabama head coach Dennis Franchione to replace the ousted Slocum. Franchione brought the majority of his coaching staff from the Crimson Tide for the 2003 season. Franchione signed a contract that was set to pay him a yearly salary of $1.7 million through 2010.

The Aggies finished the 2003 season with a 4–8 record, including a nationally televised 77–0 loss to Oklahoma, the worst loss in A&M's history. The season also marked the first losing season for the Aggies after 21 years. In the 2004 season, Franchione attempted the rebuilding process as the team improved to a 7–5 record, and a 5–3 record in conference play, including a 35–34 overtime loss to unranked Baylor, ending a 13-game winning streak the Aggies had over Baylor and a 32–25 overtime win over the then No. 25 Texas Tech at Kyle Field, snapping a 3-game skid to the Red Raiders. The Aggies ended up advancing to the Cotton Bowl Classic to play No. 17 Tennessee, but lost 38–7. Following the bowl game, A&M officials extended Franchione's contract through 2012 and raised his salary to $2 million. In June 2005, prior to the 2005 season, Franchione donated $1 million to the A&M athletic department. The donation went toward the construction of an indoor practice facility, which is now located adjacent to Kyle Field.

In the 2005 season, Franchione's Aggies, who were ranked 17th in the preseason AP Poll, regressed to a 5–6 record. The 2005 Aggie defense ranked 107th nationally (out of 119 NCAA Division I-A teams) and allowed 443.8 yards per game. This prompted Franchione to dismiss defensive coordinator Carl Torbush. Franchione then hired former Western Michigan head coach Gary Darnell to replace Torbush. In the 2006 season, the Aggies again rebounded under Franchione, posting a 9–3 regular season record that included Franchione's first win over rival Texas. The 9–3 record also marked the most wins for A&M since 1998. However, in that season's Oklahoma game, which ESPN's College GameDay visited, Franchione was criticized by fans for making a field goal call with 3:28 left in the game. The 18th-ranked Sooners ended up defeating the 21st-ranked Aggies, 17–16. In the postseason, the Aggies faced 20th-ranked California in the Holiday Bowl and lost 45–10.

During the 2007 season, Franchione was discovered selling a secret email newsletter, which violated two NCAA rules and one of the Big 12's "Principles and Standards of Sportsmanship". After the Aggies' 34–17 loss to unranked Miami in September 2007, Franchione's coaching abilities were questioned. Several news outlets reported that Franchione would not return for the 2008 season. After Franchione led the Aggies to a 38–30 victory over 13th-ranked Texas, he announced his resignation. According to ESPN's Pat Forde, any realistic chance of Franchione returning ended with the furor over the newsletter. Defensive coordinator Gary Darnell was named interim head coach and led the Aggies to a 24–17 defeat against Penn State in the Alamo Bowl.

=== Mike Sherman era (2008–2011) ===
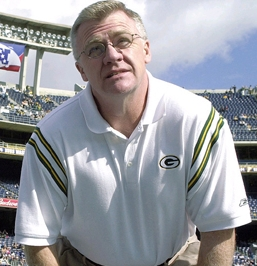
Coach Sherman

Mike Sherman was hired away from his post as offensive coordinator of the NFL's Houston Texans to replace Franchione. Sherman signed a 7-year contract that at the time paid him $1.8 million annually. Sherman abandoned the zone read option offense run by Franchione and his coaching staff, and installed a pro-style system. A&M used a balanced offense run primarily out of the pro-style formations. Sherman's quarterbacks at A&M were Stephen McGee and Ryan Tannehill, both of whom would go on to be drafted into the NFL.

After two straight losing seasons, the Aggies started the 2010 season 3–3 but won their final six games and earn a share of the Big 12 South Division title. No. 18 Texas A&M went on to play No. 11 LSU in the Cotton Bowl. Texas A&M lost 41–24 to end the season at 9–4. After the 2010 season, A&M signed Sherman a contract extension through the 2015 season. His salary was raised to $2.2 million.

In 2011, the Aggies began as a top 10 ranked team, but fell out of the polls after losing four games, three of which had double-digit half-time leads. Three of those four losses were to teams later ranked among the top ten in the nation. On November 12, 2011, Texas A&M lost 53–50 after 4 overtimes to the Kansas State University, the most overtimes in program history until a record 7-overtime 74–72 victory over Louisiana State University on November 24, 2018. On November 19, 2011, the Aggies defeated Kansas 61–7 and became bowl-eligible for a third straight season. Five days later, on November 24, 2011, they would lose at home to Texas by a score of 27–25 on a last-second field goal, in what would be the last game of the rivalry for the foreseeable future, as the Aggies were to join the SEC beginning in 2012. It was the Aggies' sixth loss of the season, and the fifth in which they held a second-half lead of two or more scores. Sherman was fired by Texas A&M on December 1, 2011. The Aggies compiled a record of 25–25 during Sherman's four-year tenure.

=== Kevin Sumlin era (2012–2017) ===
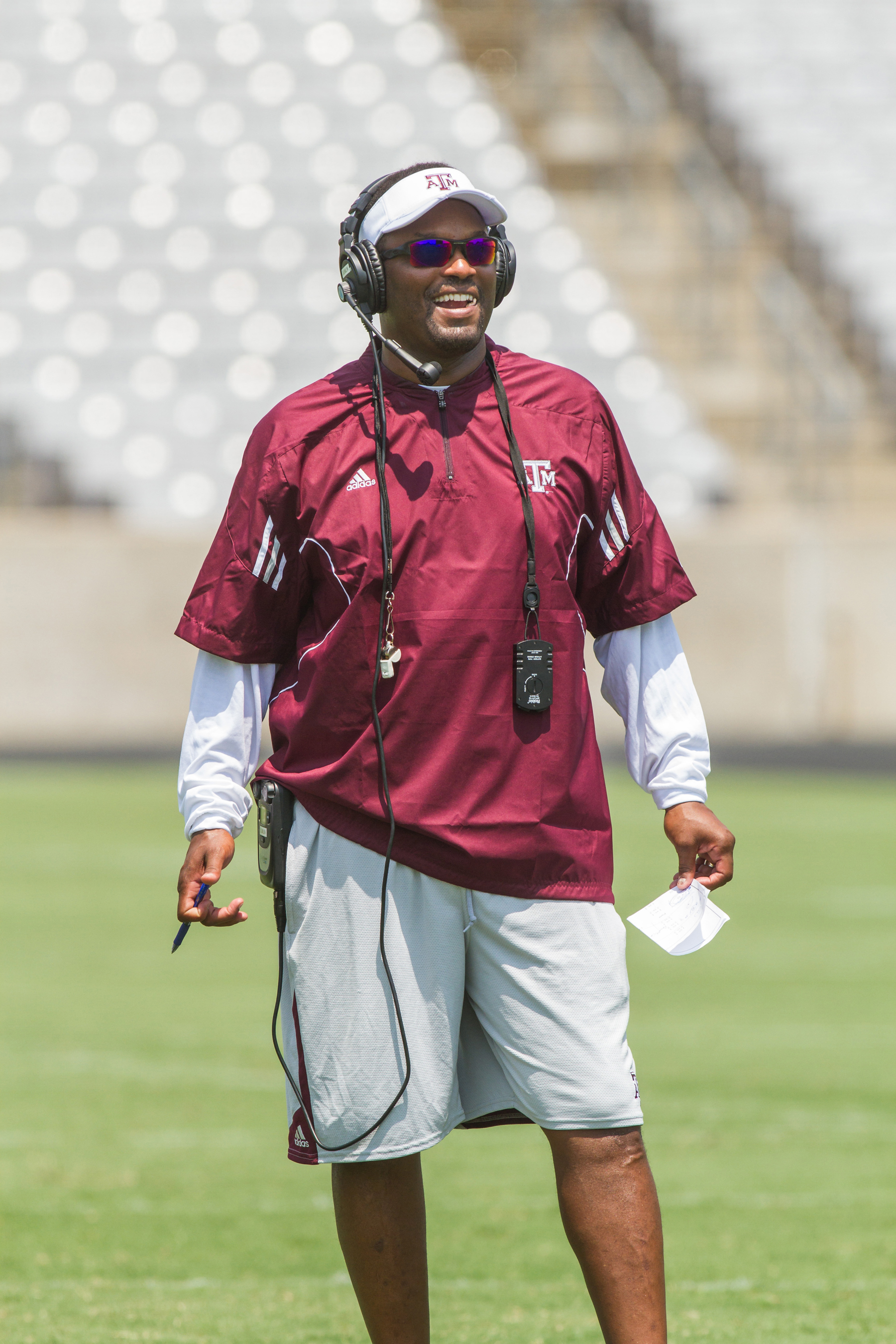
Sumlin in 2011

On December 13, 2011, A&M hired Houston head coach Kevin Sumlin as the program's 28th head football coach. Sumlin was the first African American head coach in Texas A&M football history. In 2012, Sumlin led the Aggies to an 11–2 record, including victories over then-No. 1 Alabama, and No. 11 Oklahoma in the AT&T Cotton Bowl. Starting quarterback Johnny Manziel won the Heisman Trophy. The Aggies finished the 2012 season ranked in the top 5 of both the Coaches Poll and the AP Poll. Texas A&M also led the SEC in total offense, total scoring offense, total rushing yds, and led the nation in third down conversion percentage. Kevin Sumlin and the Texas A&M Aggies became the first SEC team in history to amass over 7,000 yds in total offense. Sumlin's 2013 Aggies, led by Manziel, finished with a 9–4 record, which included a victory over Duke in the Chick-fil-A Bowl. On November 30, 2013, A&M signed Sumlin to a six-year, $30 million contract extension.

For the 2014 season, the Aggies came out strong to begin the season, winning their first 5 games before stumbling mid-season to three top 10-ranked teams, including a 59–0 loss to No. 7 ranked Alabama. The Aggies finished the season 8–5 overall and 3–5 in SEC play. With the Liberty Bowl victory over West Virginia, the Aggies won four straight bowl games for the first time in program history. After the season, which was marred by defensive struggles, Sumlin dismissed his defensive coordinator, Mark Snyder, and replaced him with John Chavis. In 2015, A&M again finished 8–5. The season was marked by a strong start with struggles to close the season. A&M finished the season with a loss to Louisville in the Music City Bowl.

Sumlin led the Aggies to a third consecutive 8–5 mark in 2016. The season was again marked a strong start with another late-season collapse, as A&M began the season 6–0, but losing four of its final five games. Texas A&M finished the 2016 season with a loss to Kansas State in the Texas Bowl. Sumlin started off the 2017 season by surrendering a 34-point lead to UCLA. Sumlin was fired from the position on November 26, 2017, after his team finished 7–5. Sumlin finished 51–26 at A&M and with a 25–23 record in the SEC. Despite A&M football's struggles during the Sumlin era, the program was recognized by Forbes in August 2018 as the most valuable in the country, based on average revenue and profit figures from the 2014–16 seasons.

=== Jimbo Fisher era (2018–2023) ===
On December 4, 2017, Florida State head coach Jimbo Fisher was formally introduced as the Aggies head coach. A splashy hire, Fisher arrived in College Station after a very successful eight-year run at FSU, leading the Seminoles to three Atlantic Coast Conference championships, six ten-win seasons, the 2013 national championship and coached Heisman Trophy winning quarterback Jameis Winston. A&M signed Fisher to a 10-year contract worth a total base salary of $75 million, the most lucrative contract in terms of guaranteed money signed by a newly hired head coach in college football history.

In 2018, Fisher led the Aggies to a 9–4 record. The season included a notable seven-overtime victory over then-No. 7 LSU. The combined 146 points scored during the game broke the NCAA FBS record for the most points scored in a game, the most points scored in a losing effort (72 by LSU), and tied the record for the most overtimes along with multiple school records for both sides. In 2019, Coach Fisher posted a 4–4 conference record, good for fourth in the Southeastern Conference West division. The Aggies wound up with an 8–5 overall win-loss record. On December 27, 2019, Texas A&M defeated #25 Oklahoma State 24–21 at the "Academy Sports + Outdoors Bowl", later titled the Texas Bowl.

The Aggies improved substantially in 2020 despite the challenges imposed by the COVID-19 pandemic. They finished the season with an 8–1 SEC record, a 9–1 overall result, and a #5 national ranking. Texas A&M faced the #13 North Carolina Tar Heels football team at the 2021 Orange Bowl on January 2, 2021. The Aggies won handily 41–27. The victory produced a combined 3–0 Orange Bowl record for Fisher following his previous successful outings with the Florida State Seminoles football team at the 2013 and 2016 Orange Bowls. In January 2021, following the Orange Bowl victory, A&M gave Fisher a new ten-year contract worth $95 million fully guaranteed excluding incentives. Texas A&M slipped in 2021. Despite an upset 41–38 win over the #1 Alabama Crimson Tide football team on October 9, 2021, and a 20–3 rout of the Auburn Tigers football team on November 6, 2021, the Aggies were unable to win consistently. They failed to qualify for a 2021-22 bowl game. Ultimately, Fisher steered the team to a 4–4 SEC conference standing and 8–4 overall record. After the 2021 season, Fisher lost his defensive coordinator Mike Elko, who took the Duke head coaching job.

The Aggies would enter the 2022 with high expectations, ranked #6 in the country. They lost six of their first nine games, including a shocking upset loss to unranked Appalachian State in the Aggies' second game. The Aggies suffered through a six-game losing streak during the season. 2022 marked the first time the Aggies had lost six consecutive games since the 1972 season. The team finished with a 5–7 mark, missing a bowl game, but ending the season on a positive note with an upset 38–23 victory over #5 LSU. In response to the offensive struggles and overall disappointment with the 2022 season, Fisher gave up play-calling duties and hired former Louisville and Arkansas head coach Bobby Petrino as the team's offensive coordinator. Fisher was fired as Aggies head coach on November 12, 2023, after having a 6–4 record through 10 games in the 2023 season. His contract was bought out for $77.5 million, more than three times the largest buyout in college football history. Fisher left College Station with a 45–25 overall record with a 27–21 record in SEC play. Defensive line coach Elijah Robinson was named interim head coach for the rest of the 2023 season.

=== Mike Elko era (2024–present) ===
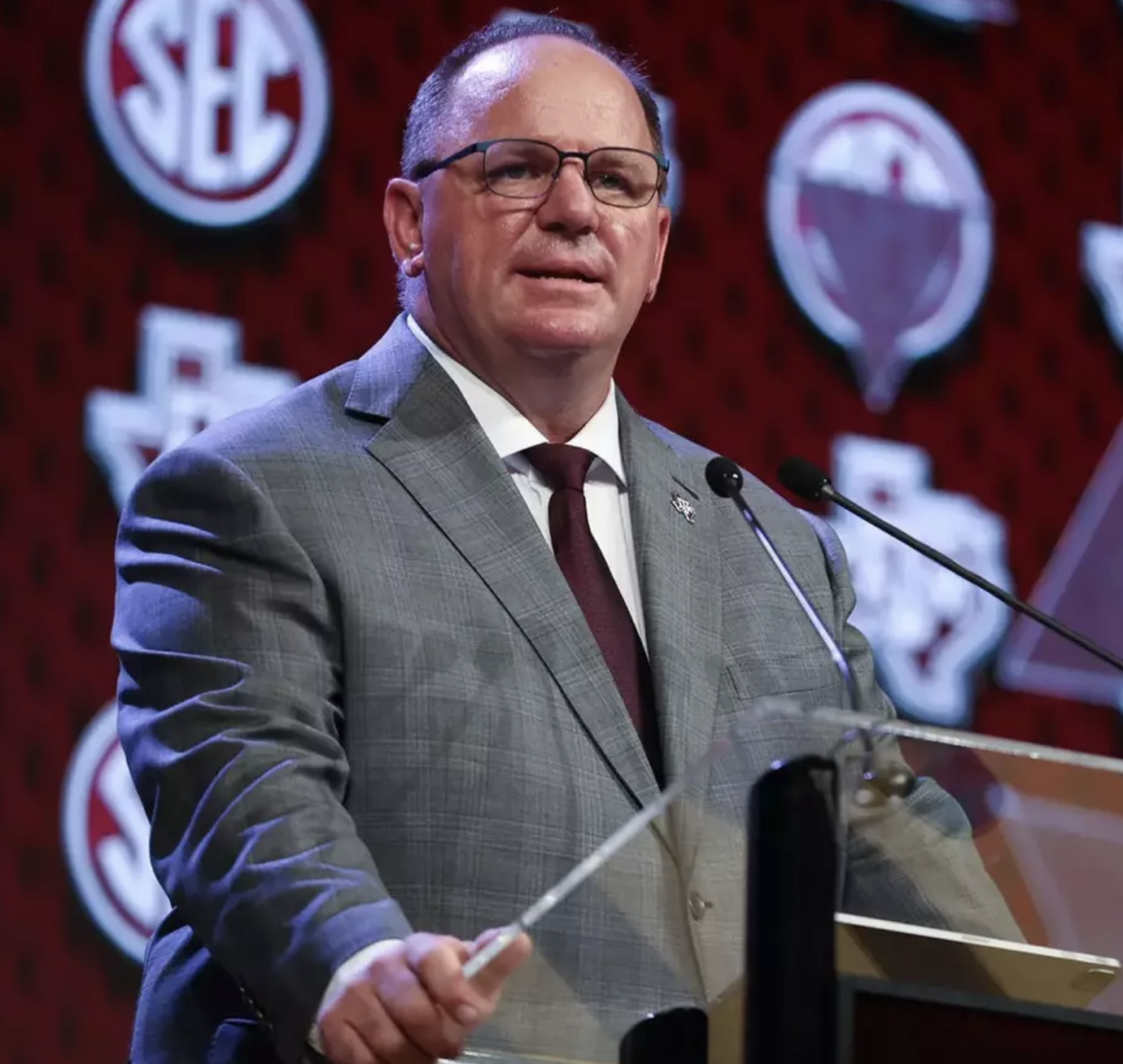
Elko in 2024

On November 26, 2023, Duke head coach Mike Elko was officially named as the new Aggies head coach. Elko had prior ties to Texas A&M, serving as Jimbo Fisher's defensive coordinator from 2018 to 2021. Elko signed a six-year contract with A&M worth $7 million annually excluding incentives.

Elko's tenure with the Aggies started positively in 2024, as through his first 7 games as head coach, the Aggies compiled a 6–1 record, 4–0 against SEC foes, and a 41–10 rout of the then 9th ranked Missouri Tigers at home. Elko wrapped up his inaugural season at Texas A&M with a 5-3 SEC record and 8-5 overall standing, including a 4OT loss to Auburn on the road, the second-highest number of overtimes in the 2024 regular college football season. This result was good enough to face USC in a competitive 2024 Las Vegas Bowl, which the Aggies ultimately lost 31-35.

Elko's second season in 2025 started with a blazing 11–0 record, their first since 1992. This included a road 41–40 win over the 8th ranked Notre Dame Fighting Irish (their road win against a ranked opponent first since 2014), and a 49–25 rout of the LSU Tigers in Death Valley, climbing all the way up to the No. 3 ranking in the AP Poll, their highest ranking since 1995, and maintained the ranking from Weeks 9–14. The Aggies finished the season 11–2 after losses to Texas and Miami (FL). The Texas A&M Aggies earned their first ever College Football Playoff selection, and were eliminated in a first round 3–10 loss to Miami.

== Conference affiliations ==
Texas A&M joined the Southeastern Conference in 2012.

- Independent (1894–1902)
- Southern Intercollegiate Athletic Association (1903–1908)
- Independent (1909–1911)
- Southern Intercollegiate Athletic Association (1912–1914)
- Texas Intercollegiate Athletic Association (1913–1917)
- Southwest Conference (1915–1995)
- Big 12 Conference (1996–2011)
- Southeastern Conference (2012–present)

== Championships ==
=== National championships ===
Texas A&M has been selected national champions in three seasons from NCAA-designated major selectors, including the AP Poll national championship in 1939. Texas A&M claims all three championships.

Season	Coach	Selectors	Record	Bowl	Final AP	Final Coaches
1919	Dana X. Bible	Billingsley, National Championship Foundation	10–0	–	–	–
1927	Dana X. Bible	Sagarin, Sagarin ELO-Chess	8–0–1	–	–	–
1939	Homer H. Norton	Associated Press, Berryman, Billingsley, Boand, CFRA, DeVold, Dunkel, Helms, Houlgate, NCF, Poling, Sagarin, Williamson	11–0	Won Sugar	No. 1	–

- The 1919 team finished 10–0–0 and was not scored upon, earning a retroactive national title by ten selectors, including the Billingsley Report and National Championship Foundation. Other systems retroactively award the 1919 National Championship to either Notre Dame or Harvard.
- The 1927 team finished 8–0–1, with a tie against TCU in Fort Worth, Texas, earning a retroactive national title awarded by the Sagarin Rating and the Sagarin ELO-Chess.
- In 1939, the undefeated Aggies (11–0) were voted No. 1 by the AP Poll shortly after its inception along with No. 1 in 8 of the 12 other major polls. Texas A&M defeated the No. 5 Tulane Green Wave in the 1940 Sugar Bowl.

=== Conference championships ===
The Aggies have won eighteen conference championships, with seventeen occurring in the Southwest Conference and the last being in the Big 12 Conference.

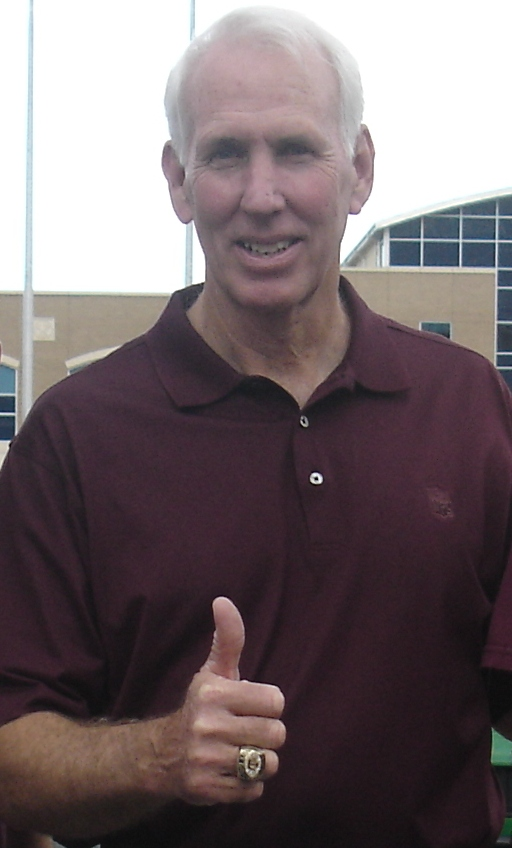
Former head coach R.C. Slocum gives a gig 'em with his Big 12 Championship ring.

Season	Conference	Coach	Overall record	Conference record
1917	Southwest Conference	Dana X. Bible	8–0	2–0
1919	Southwest Conference	Dana X. Bible	10–0	4–0
1921	Southwest Conference	Dana X. Bible	6–1–2	3–0–2
1925	Southwest Conference	Dana X. Bible	7–1–1	4–1
1927	Southwest Conference	Dana X. Bible	8–0–1	4–0–1
1939	Southwest Conference	Homer H. Norton	11–0	6–0
1940†	Southwest Conference	Homer H. Norton	9–1	5–1
1941	Southwest Conference	Homer H. Norton	9–2	5–1
1956	Southwest Conference	Paul "Bear" Bryant	9–0–1	6–0
1967	Southwest Conference	Gene Stallings	7–4–1	6–1
1975†	Southwest Conference	Emory Bellard	10–2	6–2
1985	Southwest Conference	Jackie Sherrill	10–2	7–1
1986	Southwest Conference	Jackie Sherrill	9–3	7–1
1987	Southwest Conference	Jackie Sherrill	10–2	7–1
1991	Southwest Conference	R. C. Slocum	10–2	8–0
1992	Southwest Conference	R. C. Slocum	12–1	7–0
1993	Southwest Conference	R. C. Slocum	10–2	7–0
1998	Big 12 Conference	R. C. Slocum	11–3	7–1

† Co-champions

=== Division championships ===
The Aggies were previously members of the Big 12 South between its inception in 1996 and the dissolution of conference divisions within the Big 12 in 2011. The Aggies joined the SEC as members of the SEC West starting in 2012.

Season	Division	Opponent	CG result
1997	Big 12 South	Nebraska	L 15–54
1998	Big 12 South	Kansas State	W 36–33
2010†	Big 12 South	N/A (lost tiebreaker to Oklahoma)	

† Co-champions

== Bowl games ==
Texas A&M has participated in 42 bowl games. The Aggies have a bowl record of 20–22 (.476). During their 81 years in the Southwest Conference, the Aggies went 12–10 (.545) in bowl games, winning their AP National Championship in 1939. During their 16 years in the Big 12 Conference, the Aggies went 2–9 (.182) in bowl games. Since joining the Southeastern Conference in 2012, the Aggies have gone 6–3 (.667) in bowl games.

Season	Coach	Bowl	Opponent	Result
1921	Dana X. Bible	Dixie Classic	Centre	W 22–14
1939	Homer H. Norton	Sugar Bowl	Tulane	W 14–13
1940	Homer H. Norton	Cotton Bowl Classic	Fordham	W 13–12
1941	Homer H. Norton	Cotton Bowl Classic	Alabama	L 21–29
1943	Homer H. Norton	Orange Bowl	LSU	L 14–19
1950	Harry Stiteler	Presidential Cup Bowl	Georgia	W 40–20
1957	Bear Bryant	Gator Bowl	Tennessee	L 0–3
1967	Gene Stallings	Cotton Bowl Classic	Alabama	W 20–16
1975	Emory Bellard	Liberty Bowl	Southern California	L 0–20
1976	Emory Bellard	Sun Bowl	Florida	W 37–14
1977	Emory Bellard	Bluebonnet Bowl	Southern California	L 28–47
1978	Tom Wilson	Hall of Fame Classic	Iowa State	W 28–12
1981	Tom Wilson	Independence Bowl	Oklahoma State	W 33–16
1985	Jackie Sherrill	Cotton Bowl Classic	Auburn	W 36–16
1986	Jackie Sherrill	Cotton Bowl Classic	Ohio State	L 12–28
1987	Jackie Sherrill	Cotton Bowl Classic	Notre Dame	W 35–10
1989	R. C. Slocum	John Hancock Bowl	Pittsburgh	L 28–31
1990	R. C. Slocum	Holiday Bowl	BYU	W 65–14
1991	R. C. Slocum	Cotton Bowl Classic	Florida State	L 2–10
1992	R. C. Slocum	Cotton Bowl Classic	Notre Dame	L 3–28
1993	R. C. Slocum	Cotton Bowl Classic	Notre Dame	L 21–24
1995	R. C. Slocum	Alamo Bowl	Michigan	W 22–20
1997	R. C. Slocum	Cotton Bowl Classic	UCLA	L 23–29
1998	R. C. Slocum	Sugar Bowl	Ohio State	L 14–24
1999	R. C. Slocum	Alamo Bowl	Penn State	L 0–24
2000	R. C. Slocum	Independence Bowl	Mississippi State	L 41–43
2001	R. C. Slocum	Galleryfurniture.com Bowl	TCU	W 28–9
2004	Dennis Franchione	Cotton Bowl Classic	Tennessee	L 7–38
2006	Dennis Franchione	Holiday Bowl	California	L 10–45
2007	Gary Darnell (interim)	Alamo Bowl	Penn State	L 17–24
2009	Mike Sherman	Independence Bowl	Georgia	L 20–44
2010	Mike Sherman	Cotton Bowl Classic	LSU	L 24–41
2011	Tim DeRuyter (interim)	Meineke Car Care Bowl of Texas	Northwestern	W 33–22
2012	Kevin Sumlin	Cotton Bowl Classic	Oklahoma	W 41–13
2013	Kevin Sumlin	Chick-fil-A Bowl	Duke	W 52–48
2014	Kevin Sumlin	Liberty Bowl	West Virginia	W 45–37
2015	Kevin Sumlin	Music City Bowl	Louisville	L 21–27
2016	Kevin Sumlin	Texas Bowl	Kansas State	L 28–33
2017	Jeff Banks (interim)	Belk Bowl	Wake Forest	L 52–55
2018	Jimbo Fisher	Gator Bowl	NC State	W 52–13
2019	Jimbo Fisher	Texas Bowl	Oklahoma State	W 24–21
2020	Jimbo Fisher	Orange Bowl †	North Carolina	W 41–27
2023	Elijah Robinson (interim)	Texas Bowl	Oklahoma State	L 23–31
2024	Mike Elko	Las Vegas Bowl	Southern California	L 31–35
2025	Mike Elko	CFP First Round	Miami (FL)	L 3–10

† New Year's Six bowl game

== Rivalries ==
=== Texas ===
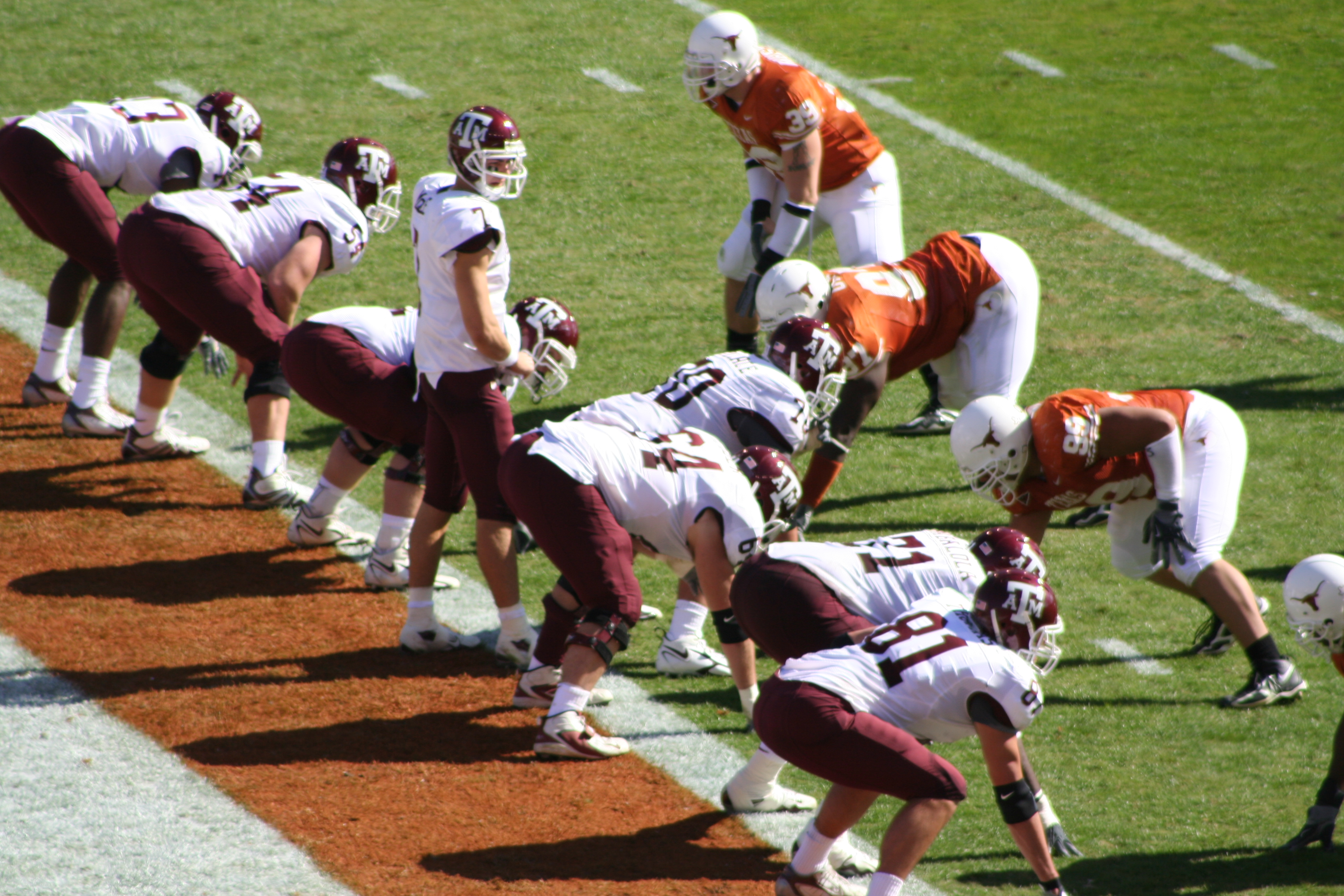
2006 Lone Star Showdown football game

The Texas-Texas A&M rivalry dates back to 1894. It is the longest-running rivalry for both teams. It ranks as the third most-played rivalry in Division I-A college football, and the most-played intrastate rivalry. Most of the series' lopsided victories occurred prior to A&M's transition from an all-male and all-white military school, and the rivalry has been fairly even since. Until the rivalry ended in 2012, the two teams played each other every year since 1894 with the exception of six seasons [1895 (when the Aggies did not field a team), 1896, 1897, 1913, and 1914]. During some seasons, the Aggies and Longhorns played each other twice.

In an attempt to generate more attention for the rivalry in sports other than football, in 2004 the two schools started the Lone Star Showdown, a trial two-year program. Essentially, each time the two schools meet in a sport, the winner of the matchup gets a point. At the end of the year, the school with the most points wins the series and receives the Lone Star Showdown trophy.

Aspects of the rivalry include:

- Each school mentions the other in its fight song (Texas with "and it's goodbye to A&M" in Texas Fight, and the Aggies singing "Goodbye to Texas University, so long to the orange and the white" as the opening line of the second verse of the Aggie War Hymn, and "saw Varsity's horns off" about Texas in the chorus.)
- The football series between the two universities is the third longest running rivalry in all of college football. Since 1900, the last regular season football game is usually reserved for their matchup.
- Each school has elaborate pre-game preparations for the annual football clash, including the Aggie Bonfire and the Hex Rally.
- Texas has a unique lighting scheme for the UT Tower after wins over Texas A&M.
- In the past, mischief has preceded the annual game, such as the "kidnapping" of Bevo.

Though the Longhorns lead the series overall (77–37–5), the series has been much closer since 1965 (when Texas A&M dropped compulsory participation in the Corps of Cadets). Since that time, the Aggies have accumulated 20 wins to 27 losses. During the last 40 meetings (from 1972—when the NCAA introduced scholarship limitations—to the present), the series is nearly even at 19–21. The Aggies' best years in recent times were from 1984 to 1994 when they won 10 out of 11 games, losing only in 1990 by one point.

Over the life of the series, the Aggies have shut out the Longhorns 13 times, and have been shut out 27 times (including scoreless ties in 1902, 1907, and 1921). However, since 1961, neither team has been shut out. The Aggies and Longhorns have never had a game decided in overtime. The Longhorns hold the largest margin of victory with a 48–0 win in Austin on October 22, 1898 (the second meeting in the series). The Longhorns also hold the series' longest winning streak of 10 games from 1957 to 1966. In addition, the Longhorns had an 11-game unbeaten streak from 1940 to 1950 that included a 14–14 tie in 1948.

In the 75 meetings since 1936 when the Associated Press College Poll began, the Aggies and Longhorns have faced each other 59 times when one or both teams have been ranked (the Aggies have been ranked 25 times, whereas the Longhorns have been ranked 44 times). In those 59 meetings, the lower-ranked or unranked team has won 11 times (the Aggies did it six times—1951, 1979, 1984, 1999, 2006, and 2007; the Longhorns did it five times—1941, 1955, 1957, 1974, and 1998).

In 2024, #3 Texas defeated #20 Texas A&M to clinch a spot in the 2024 SEC Championship Game in the rivalries first match up after a 13-year hiatus, following Texas move to the conference that fall.

=== LSU ===
Texas A&M and LSU were both members of the Southern Intercollegiate Athletic Association from 1903 to 1908 and 1912–1914 and are both members of the SEC. The Aggies first played the Tigers in College Station in 1899, winning 52–0. The Tigers are the Aggies' seventh-oldest collegiate-football rival. Last played in 1995, the Aggies and Tigers then faced off in the 2011 Cotton Bowl Classic. The series resumed in 2012, when the Aggies joined the SEC. Between 2014 and 2024, the Aggies became LSU's final regular season opponent. LSU leads the series 32*–25–3 through the 2025 season.

Over the life of the series, the Aggies have claimed the largest margin of victory with a 63–9 final score in 1914 (the Aggies also have the next two largest margins of victory with the 52–0 win in 1899 and 47–0 win in 1922). The Aggies have shut-out the Tigers 7 times (including the Aggies' non-university recognized National Championship Season of 1917 when they did not surrender a point during 8 games, and beat the Tigers 27–0). The Tigers have shut-out the Aggies 9 times (including the Tigers' non-university recognized National Championship season of 1908, when they beat the Aggies 26–0, and the Tigers' non-university recognized National Championship season of 1962, when they beat the Aggies 21–0). Add to those totals the game in which the Aggies and Tigers shut each other out 0–0 in 1920. The Tigers hold the series' longest winning streak of 7 games from 2011 to 2017. The 1960 winning streak was part of a 10-game unbeaten streak for the Tigers from 1960 to 1969 which included a 7–7 tie in 1966. From 1945 to 1973 was the most dominant span by either team in the series history. LSU was 17–3–1 vs Texas A&M during this span.

*4 LSU wins have been vacated by the NCAA

=== Arkansas ===
The Aggies first played the Razorbacks in 1903. From 1934 to 1991, the two teams played annually as Southwest Conference members. In 1991, however, Arkansas left the Southwest Conference to join the Southeastern Conference. Arkansas leads the all-time series 42–37–3 through the 2025 season.

On March 10, 2008, officials from both schools announced the revival of the series, which recommenced on October 3, 2009. The game is played at Cowboys Stadium, which was initially expected to hold about 80,000 fans. The game is dubbed "The Southwest Classic", which pays homage to both schools' past relationship to the Southwest Conference. The initial agreement between the two schools allows the game to be played for at least 10 years, followed by five consecutive four-year rollover options, allowing the game to be played for a total of 30 consecutive seasons.

Once the Aggies joined the SEC, the agreement with Cowboys Stadium came to an end because the SEC does not allow its members to entertain potential recruits at neutral-site games. However, the SEC has removed this recruiting rule, and the Aggies and Razorbacks will again move the rivalry to AT&T Stadium in 2014. (cf. Georgia and Florida, which play at a neutral site, do not intend to entertain recruits at that site.) This agreement lasted 11 seasons, or through the 2024 football season. In 2025, the series moved back to local stadiums, with the first game played in Fayetteville.

Over the life of the series, the Aggies have shut out the Razorbacks 10 times, and been shut out 9 times. The Aggies hold the largest margin of victory with a 58–10 win in College Station on September 29, 2012 (the Aggies also hold the second-largest margin of victory with a 41–0 win in College Station in 1942). The Razorbacks and Aggies are tied for the longest winning streak at 9, the Razorbacks from 1958 to 1966, and the Aggies from 2012 to 2020.

=== Baylor ===
The Aggies first played the Baylor Bears in 1899, and competed with them annually since 1945. It is the Aggies' eighth-oldest collegiate-football rivalry, and their third most played behind TCU and Texas. The rivalry is nicknamed the Battle of the Brazos, a term coined after the Brazos River, which flows by the two schools which are only 90 miles (145 km) apart. Texas A&M leads the series 68–31–9. The Aggies' 68 wins against the Bears is the highest number of wins that the Aggies have accumulated against any team. From 1960 to 1990 the rivalry was very competitive as A&M won 16 times, Baylor won 13 times, and 2 games ended in ties; while many of the games were decided by 7 points or less.

Over the life of the series, the Aggies have shutout the Bears 29 times (including scoreless ties in 1903, 1923, 1932, and 1936). The Bears have shutout the Aggies 11 times (including those same scoreless ties). The Aggies hold the largest margin of victory with a 73–10 win in College Station on October 11, 2003, as well as the second-largest margin of victory with a 53–0 win in College Station in 1912. The Aggies hold the longest winning streak in the series of 13 games from 1991 to 2003. That winning streak is also part of an 18-game unbeaten streak for the Aggies from 1986 to 2003 (the Aggies and Bears played to a 20–20 tie in 1990).

As with the Texas Longhorns rivalry, the Baylor rivalry was put on hold after the 2011 season with the Aggies decision to leave the Big 12 Conference. When A&M announced its decision to leave the Big 12 and join the SEC in 2011, then-Baylor president Kenneth Starr filed suit in federal court in an attempt to block A&M from moving. Eventually the lawsuit was dropped, and soon thereafter, Missouri announced it was joining A&M in departing the Big 12 for the SEC.

=== Texas Tech ===
The Aggies first played the Red Raiders in 1927. The Aggies lead the all-time series 37–32–1.

Over the life of the series, the Aggies have shutout the Red Raiders four times, and the Red Raiders have shutout the Aggies four times. The Aggies hold the largest margin of victory with a 47–6 win in College Station on November 28, 1927. The Aggies and Red Raiders each have win streaks of six games, which are the longest in the series (the Aggies' streak included the 1927 and 1932 games as well as the games from 1942 to 1945; the Red Raiders' streak was uninterrupted from 1968 to 1973).

The series continued from the Southwest Conference to the Big 12, with the Aggies defeating the Red Raiders only 6 times between 1996 and 2011, 3 of which came in a row between 2009 and 2011. However, following the Aggies move to the SEC, the rivalry has not been played, with the most recent game being a 45-40 Aggie victory in Lubbock during the 2011 season.

=== TCU ===
The rivalry with TCU began in 1897 and is the Aggies' third-oldest collegiate-football rivalry. Though the Aggies no longer play the Horned Frogs annually since the Southwest Conference disbanded in 1996, this series is still notable because it contains the longest, active winning streak that the Aggies have against any opponent. The Horned Frogs have not beaten the Aggies since October 21, 1972, when they won in College Station with a final score of 13–10. Adding further intrigue to this series is the fact that the Aggies' National Championship Season of 1939 succeeded the Horned Frogs' National Championship Season of 1938. Texas A&M leads the series 56–29–7 through the 2025 season, although the two teams have not played since 2001.

== Individual accomplishments ==
=== National awards ===
==== Overall Honors ====
- Heisman Trophy
  John David Crow (1957)
  Johnny Manziel (2012)
- AP Player of the Year
  Johnny Manziel (2012)
- SN Player of the Year
  John David Crow (1957)
  Johnny Manziel (2012)
- UPI Player of the Year
  John David Crow (1957)
- Outland Trophy
  Luke Joeckel (2012)
- Paul Hornung Award
  KC Concepcion (2025)
- Archie Griffin Award
  Johnny Manziel (2012)
- Chic Harley Award
  John David Crow (1957)
  Johnny Manziel (2012)

==== Offensive Honors ====
- Davey O'Brien Award
  Johnny Manziel (2012)
- Manning Award
  Johnny Manziel (2012)
- Jim Parker Trophy
  Luke Joeckel (2012)

==== Defensive Honors ====
- Dick Butkus Award
  Von Miller (2010)
- Chuck Bednarik Award
  Dat Nguyen (1998)
- Lombardi Award
  Dat Nguyen (1998)
- Jack Lambert Trophy
  Dat Nguyen (1998)
  Von Miller (2010)
- Bill Willis Trophy
  Myles Garrett (2015)

==== Special Teams Honors ====
- Lou Groza Award
  Randy Bullock (2011)
- Ray Guy Award
  Braden Mann (2018)

==== Coaching Honors ====
- SN Coach of The Year
  Emory Bellard (1975)

==== Other Honors ====
- Wuerffel Trophy
  Trevor Knight (2016)

=== Conference awards ===
==== SWC ====
- SWC Offensive Player of the Year
  Derace Moser (1941)
  Kevin Murray (1986)
  Darren Lewis (1988)
  Bucky Richardson (1991)
- SWC Defensive Player of the Year
  Ed Simonini (1973)
  John Roper (1987)
  Quentin Coryatt (1991)
  Marcus Buckley (1992)
  Aaron Glenn (1993)
- SWC Offensive Newcomer of the Year
  Curtis Dickey (1976)
  Johnny Hector (1990)
  Kevin Murray (1983)
  Darren Lewis (1987)
  Robert Wilson (1988)
  Greg Hill (1991)
  Leeland McElroy (1993)
- SWC Defensive Newcomer of the Year
  Jerry Bullitt (1980)
  Quentin Coryatt (1990)
  Sam Adams (1991)
  Aaron Glenn (1992)
- SWC Coach of the Year
  Gene Stallings (1967)
  Emory Bellard (1975)
  Jackie Sherrill (1985, 1986, 1987)
  R.C. Slocum (1991, 1992, 1993)

==== Big 12 ====
- Big 12 Defensive Player of the Year
  Dat Nguyen (1998)
- Big 12 Offensive Newcomer of the Year
  Robert Ferguson (2000)
- Big 12 Defensive Newcomer of the Year
  Misi Tupe (2006)
- Big 12 Offensive Freshman of the Year
  Christine Michael (2009)
- Big 12 Offensive Lineman of the Year
  Cody Wallace (2007)

==== SEC ====
- SEC Offensive Player of the Year
  Johnny Manziel (2012)
- SEC Defensive Player of the Year
  Cashius Howell (2025)
- SEC Special Teams Player of the Year
  Braden Mann (2018)
- Jacobs Blocking Trophy (SEC)
  Luke Joeckel (2012)
  Jake Matthews (2013)
  Trey Zuhn III (2025)
- SEC Freshman of the Year
  Johnny Manziel (2012)
  Christian Kirk (2015)
- SEC Coach of the Year
  Kevin Sumlin (2012)

=== Aggies in the NFL ===
All former players on Active NFL Rosters or reserved list

Name	Position	Team	Notes
De'Von Achane	RB	Miami Dolphins	
Chase Bisontis	OG	Arizona Cardinals	
Nate Boerkircher	TE	Jacksonville Jaguars	
Bobby Brown III	DT	Carolina Panthers	
Tyreek Chappell	CB	Minnesota Vikings	
Micheal Clemons	DE	Indianapolis Colts	
KC Concepcion	WR	Cleveland Browns	
Edgerrin Cooper	LB	Greenbay Packers	
Dametrious Crownover	OT	New England Patriots	
Jermaine Eluemunor	OT	New York Giants	
Mike Evans	WR	San Francisco 49ers	
Myles Garrett	OLB	Los Angeles Rams	
Cashius Howell	DE	Cincinnati Bengals	
Antonio Johnson	S	Jacksonville Jaguars	
Jaylon Jones	CB	Indianapolis Colts	
Christian Kirk	WR	San Francisco 49ers	
Will Lee III	CB	Carolina Panthers	
Nnamdi Madubuike	DE	Baltimore Ravens	
Braden Mann	P	Philadelphia Eagles	
Jake Matthews	OT	Atlanta Falcons	
Ryan McCollum	OC	Pittsburgh Steelers	
Erik McCoy	OG/C	New Orleans Saints	
Von Miller	OLB	Dallas Cowboys	
Dan Moore Jr.	OT	Tennessee Titans	
Tyler Onyedim	DE	Denver Broncos	
Ar'maj Reed-Adams	OG	Buffalo Bills	
Albert Regis	DT	Jacksonville Jaguars	
Nic Scourton	OLB	Carolina Panthers	
EJ Smith	RB	Kansas City Chiefs	
Shemar Stewart	DE	Cincinnati Bengals	
Shemar Turner	DE	Chicago Bears	
Jahdae Walker	WR	Chicago Bears	
Trey Zuhn III	OT/C	Las Vegas Raiders	

== Heisman Trophy ==
Top 5 finishes for Texas A&M players:

Year	Name	Position	Finish
1939	John Kimbrough	FB	5th
1940	John Kimbrough	FB	2nd
1957	John David Crow	RB	1st
2012	Johnny Manziel	QB	1st
2013	Johnny Manziel	QB	5th

== Texas A&M first-team All-Americans ==
In the years since 1889, several organizations and publications have recognized the top players in the nation by naming them to All-America teams. To be considered an All-American, a player needs to be named to the first-team on at least one of the lists of these organizations. In addition, the NCAA further recognizes certain players by honoring them with the "Consensus" All-American title. At present, the Consensus honor is determined by referencing the first, second, and third teams of five organizations and assigning a varying number of points for each time a player appears on one of those five lists. The points are totaled and the player with the most points at his position is awarded the Consensus honor. The five organizations whose lists are used for the Consensus determination are the Associated Press (AP), American Football Coaches Association (AFCA), Football Writers Association of America (FWAA), Sporting News (TSN), and Walter Camp Football Foundation (WCFF). Finally, a player can be recognized with the "Unanimous Consensus" honor if all five of the previously listed organizations have recognized that player as a First-Team All-American.

Texas A&M has had 53 players that have been named First-Team All-Americans for a total of 72 seasons (19 players have been honored in two different seasons). 30 of those were Consensus All-Americans. Texas A&M has had 27 All-Americans on Offense, 34 All-Americans on Defense, and 11 All-Americans on Special Teams. The Linebacker position is the most represented position with 14 selections (Offensive Tackle/Offensive Guard is the next highest with 12 selections). Texas A&M has had an All-American selection at every position, and has had at least one All-American in every decade since the 1930s. The highest number of All-Americans during one decade took place from 1990 to 1999 when 16 players were named All-Americans for a total of 18 seasons.

Name	Position	Years at Texas A&M	All-America							
Name	Position	Years at Texas A&M	AP (Since 1925)	AFCA (Since 1945)	FWAA (Since 1944)	TSN (Since 1934)	WCFF (Since 1889)	Other	Consensus	Unanimous Consensus
Sam Adams	DE	1991–1993	1993	1993		1993	1993	1993	1993	
Antonio Armstrong	LB	1991–1994	1994					1994		
Mike Arthur	C	1987–1990			1990					
Patrick Bates	FS	1992			1992	1992		1992		
Rod Bernstine	TE	1983–1986						1986		
Joe Boyd	OT	1936–1939						1939		
Marcus Buckley	LB	1990–1992	1992	1992	1992	1992	1992	1992	1992	1992
Randy Bullock	PK	2008–2011	2011	2011		2011	2011	2011	2011	
Ray Childress	DT	1981–1984				1984		1983; 1984	1984	
KC Concepcion	AP/RS	2025	2025	2025	2025			2025	2025	
Edgerrin Cooper	LB	2020–2023	2023	2023			2023	2023	2023	
Quentin Coryatt	LB	1989–1991						1991		
John David Crow	RB	1955–1957	1957	1957	1957	1956; 1957	1957	1957	1957	1957
Dave Elmendorf	FS	1968–1970	1970		1970				1970	
Mike Evans	WR	2012–2013	2013	2013	2013	2013	2013	2013	2013	2013
Tony Franklin	PK	1975–1978			1976; 1978			1976	1976	
Myles Garrett	DE	2014–2016	2016	2016	2015; 2016	2016	2015; 2016	2016	2016	2016
Aaron Glenn	DB	1992–1993	1993	1993	1993	1993	1993	1993	1993	1993
Dennis Goehring	OG	1953–1956						1956		
Jacob Green	DE	1977–1979	1979				1979	1978		
Kenyon Green	OT	2019–2021	2021		2020	2020; 2021		2020; 2021	2020; 2021	
Lester Hayes	FS	1973–1976				1976				
Bill Hobbs	LB	1965–1968	1967					1968		
Johnny Holland	LB	1983–1986	1985		1985			1986	1985	
Cashius Howell	DL	2024–2025	2025	2025	2025	2025	2025	2025	2025	2025
Robert Jackson	LB	1973–1976	1976	1976	1976	1976	1976	1976	1976	1976
Luke Joeckel	OT	2010–2012	2012	2012	2012	2012	2012	2012	2012	2012
Drew Kaser	P	2012–2015	2013	2013	2013	2013	2013	2013; 2015	2013	2013
John Kimbrough	FB	1938–1940	1939; 1940				1939; 1940	1939; 1940	1939; 1940	1940
Christian Kirk	PR	2015–2017						2015		
Charlie Krueger	OT	1955–1957			1957			1956; 1957		
Rolf Krueger	OT	1965–1968				1968		1968		
DeMarvin Leal	DE	2019–2021	2021			2021		2021	2021	
Shane Lechler	P	1996–1999	1999			1998		1999		
Darren Lewis	RB	1987–1990	1988; 1990	1990		1988	1990	1990	1990	
Jack Little	FB	1949–1952			1951			1952		
Leeland McElroy	AP/KR	1993–1995	1995		1994	1994	1994	1994	1994	
Braden Mann	P	2016-2019	2018	2018	2018	2018	2018	2018; 2019	2018	2018
Johnny Manziel	QB	2012–2013	2012; 2013		2012	2012	2012	2012;2013	2012	
Jake Matthews	OT	2010–2013	2013	2013	2012; 2013	2013	2013	2013	2013	2013
Tommy Maxwell	FS	1965–1968				1968		1968		
Ray Mickens	DB	1992–1995					1995			
Von Miller	DE/LB	2007–2010	2010			2009	2010	2009; 2010	2010	
Brandon Mitchell	DE	1993–1996					1995			
Keith Mitchell	LB	1993–1996						1996		
Damontre Moore	DE	2010–2012		2012	2012		2012	2012	2012	
Maurice "Mo" Moorman	OT	1966–1967			1966	1966		1966		
Dat Nguyen	LB	1995–1998	1998	1998	1998	1998	1998	1998	1998	1998
Steve O'Neal	P	1965–1968				1968				
Jack Pardee	FB	1954–1956			1956			1956		
Marshall Robnett	OG	1938–1940					1940	1940	1940	
John Roper	LB	1985–1988	1987		1987				1987	
Joe Routt	OG	1935–1937	1936; 1937					1937	1937	
Ed Simonini	LB	1972–1975	1975	1975	1975	1975	1975	1975	1975	1975
Bob Smith	RB	1949–1951						1950		
Kevin Smith	CB	1988–1991	1991	1991		1991	1991	1991	1991	
Jace Sternberger	TE	2018	2018		2018	2018	2018	2018	2018	
Garth TenNapel	LB	1973–1975						1975		
Pat Thomas	CB	1972–1975	1974; 1975	1975	1974		1975	1974; 1975	1974; 1975	
Jason Webster	DB	1996–1999						1999		

== Hall of Fame ==
=== College Football Hall of Fame coaches ===
Texas A&M has six coaches inducted into the College Football Hall of Fame.

Coach	Years	Induction
Madison A. "Matty" Bell	1929–1933	1955
Dana X. Bible	1917, 1919–1928	1951
Paul "Bear" Bryant	1954–1957	1986
Homer H. Norton	1934–1947	1971
Gene Stallings	1965–1971	2010
RC Slocum	1982–2002	2012

=== College Football Hall of Fame players ===
Texas A&M has 12 players inducted into the College Football Hall of Fame.

Player	Position	Years	Induction
Ray Childress	DT	1981–1984	2010
John David Crow	HB	1955–1957	1976
Dave Elmendorf	S	1968–1970	1997
Jacob Green	DE	1977–1979	2019
Joel Hunt	HB	1925–1927	1967
John Kimbrough	FB	1938–1940	1954
Charlie Krueger	T	1955–1957	1983
Dat Nguyen	LB	1995–1998	2017
Jack Pardee	FB	1954–1956	1986
Joe Routt	G	1935–1937	1962
Gene Stallings	DB	1954–1956	2010
Joe Utay	HB	1905–1907	1974

=== Pro Football Hall of Fame players ===
Player	Position	Years	Induction	Ref
Yale Lary	S	1948–1951	1979	

== Venue ==
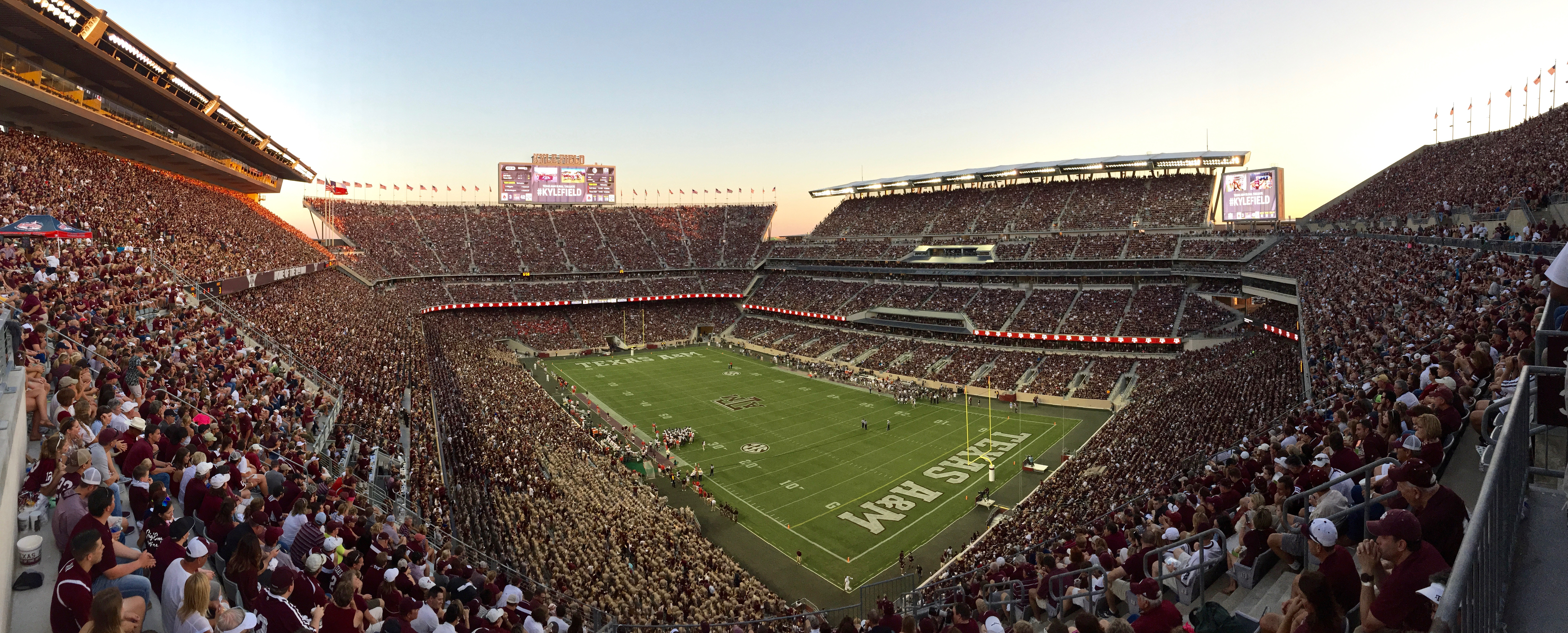
Kyle Field stadium (pictured in 2015), where the Aggies play their home games

The Aggies play at Kyle Field, which has been the home to the Aggies in rudimentary form since 1904, and as a permanent concrete stadium since 1927. The seating capacity of 102,733 in 2015 makes the stadium the largest in the Southeastern Conference and the fourth-largest stadium in the NCAA, the fourth-largest stadium in the United States, and the sixth-largest non-racing stadium in the world. It is also the largest football stadium in the state of Texas.

== Traditions ==
=== 12th Man ===
Aggie football fans call themselves the 12th Man, meaning they are there to support the 11 players on the field. To further symbolize their "readiness, desire, and enthusiasm," the entire student body stands throughout the game. In a further show of respect, the students step "off the wood" (step off the bleachers onto the concrete) whenever a player is injured or when the band plays the Aggie War Hymn or The Spirit of Aggieland.

Seniors wearing either their Senior boots or Aggie Rings are also encouraged to join the "Boot Line." As the Fightin' Texas Aggie Band leaves the field after their half-time performances, seniors line up at the south end of Kyle Field to welcome the team back onto the field for the second half.

The tradition began in Dallas on January 2, 1922, at the Dixie Classic, the forerunner of the Cotton Bowl Classic. A&M played defending national champion Centre College in the first post-season game in the southwest. In this hard fought game, which produced national publicity, an underdog Aggie team was slowly defeating a team which had allowed fewer than 6 points per game. The first half produced so many injuries for A&M that Coach D. X. Bible feared he wouldn't have enough men to finish the game. At that moment, he called into the Aggie section of the stands for E. King Gill, a student who had left football after the regular season to play basketball. Gill, who was spotting players for a Waco newspaper and was not in football uniform, donned the uniform of injured player Heine Weir and stood on the sidelines to await his turn. Although he did not actually play in the game, his readiness to play symbolized the willingness of all Aggies to support their team to the point of actually entering the game. When the game ended in a 22–14 Aggie victory, Gill was the only man left standing on the sidelines for the Aggies. Gill later said, "I wish I could say that I went in and ran for the winning touchdown, but I did not. I simply stood by in case my team needed me."

In the 1980s, the tradition was expanded as coach Jackie Sherrill created the 12th Man squad led by 12th man standout Dean Berry. Composed solely of walk-on (non-scholarship) players, the squad would take the field for special teams' performances. This squad never allowed a kickoff return for a touchdown. Sherrill's successor, R. C. Slocum, amended the tradition in the 1990s to allow one walk-on player, wearing the No. 12 jersey, to take the field for special teams' plays. The player is chosen based on the level of determination and hard work shown in practices. Coach Dennis Franchione has continued Slocum's model, while also keeping an all-walk-on kickoff team that played three times in the 2006 season.

=== Bonfire ===
Aggie Bonfire was a long-standing tradition at Texas A&M University as part of a college rivalry with the University of Texas at Austin, known as t.u. by Texas A&M students. For ninety years, Texas A&M students built and burned a large bonfire on campus each fall. Known within the Aggie community simply as Bonfire, the annual fall event symbolized the students' "burning desire to beat the hell outta t.u." The bonfire was traditionally lit around Thanksgiving in conjunction with the festivities surrounding the annual game between the schools.

The first on-campus Aggie Bonfire was burned in 1909, and the tradition continued for the next 90 years. For almost two decades, Bonfire was constructed from debris and pieces of wood that Aggies "found," including lumber intended for a dormitory that students appropriated in 1912. The event became school-sanctioned in 1936, and, for the first time, students were provided with axes, saws, and trucks and pointed towards a grove of dead trees on the edge of town. In the following years the Bonfire became more elaborate, and in 1967 the flames could be seen 25 miles (40 km) away. In 1969, the stack set the world record at 111 feet (30 m) tall.

In 1978, Bonfire shifted to a wedding-cake style, in which upper stacks of logs were wedged on top of lower stacks. The structure was built around a fortified centerpole, made from two telephone poles. Although tradition stated that if Bonfire burned through midnight A&M would win the following day's game, with the introduction of the wedding cake design Bonfire began to fall very quickly, sometimes burning for only 30 or 45 minutes.

At 2:42 am on November 18, 1999, the partially completed Aggie Bonfire, standing 40 feet (10 m) tall and consisting of about 5000 logs, collapsed during construction. Of the 58 students and former students working on the stack, 12 were killed and 27 others were injured. On November 25, 1999, the date that Bonfire would have burned, Aggies instead held a vigil and remembrance ceremony. Over 40,000 people, including former President George H. W. Bush and his wife Barbara and then-Texas governor George W. Bush and his wife Laura, lit candles and observed up to two hours of silence at the site of the Bonfire collapse. The Bonfire Memorial was officially dedicated on November 18, 2004.

Bonfire was postponed until 2002 in order to restructure it to make it safer. Delays in the development of a safety plan and a high estimated cost (mainly due to liability insurance), led A&M president Ray Bowen to postpone Bonfire indefinitely. Despite the university's refusal to allow Bonfire to take place on campus, since 2002 a non-university sanctioned Bonfire has burned annually. Known as Student Bonfire, the off-campus event draws between 8,000 and 15,000 fans. Student Bonfire utilizes many changes for safety purposes, and has only recorded two serious injuries since its inception, neither life-threatening. The newly designed stack was designed by a professional engineer (a former student) and features a center pole with 4 perimeter poles connected via "windle-sticks". In the new design, the height is capped at 45 feet (not including the outhouse), and all the logs touch the ground. Alcohol is strictly prohibited from all student bonfire functions as it was revealed that a number of the students working on the collapsed bonfire in 1999 had BACs higher than the legal driving limit.

=== Fightin' Texas Aggie Band ===
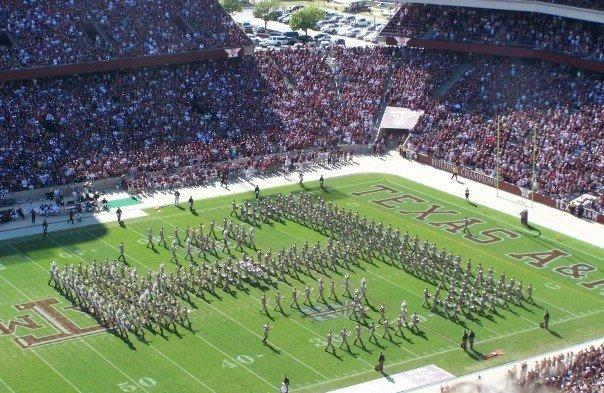
The Fightin' Texas Aggie Band marches in TAM formation during halftime at Kyle Field.

The Fightin' Texas Aggie Band (also known as The Noble Men of Kyle or the Aggie Band) is the official marching band of Texas A&M University. Composed of over 400 men and women from the school's Corps of Cadets, it is the largest military marching band in the world. The complex straight-line maneuvers, performed exclusively to traditional marches, are so complicated and precise that computer marching simulations say they cannot be performed.

Since its inception in 1894, its members eat together, sleep in the same dormitories, and practice up to forty hours per week on top of a full academic schedule. The Aggie Band performs at all home football games, some away games, and university and Corps functions throughout the year. Other events in which the band participated include inauguration parades for many United States Presidents and Texas Governors, major annual parades across the country, and the dedication ceremony for the George H. W. Bush Presidential Library.

=== Midnight Yell Practice ===
Midnight Yell Practice is a pep rally usually held the night before a football game. If the football game is to be held at Kyle Field, midnight yell takes place the day of the football game at 12:00 am. If the football game is an away game, a yell is held on the Thursday night before at the Corps Arches on the Texas A&M campus, and Midnight Yell will be held in the city the game is being played.

=== Wrecking Crew ===
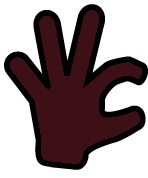
Hand sign for the Wrecking Crew

The term Wrecking Crew is a name given to defenses of the football team. The term, coined by defensive back Chet Brooks, became popular during the coach R. C. Slocum's tenure in 80s and the 90s. After the coach's firing, many fans, coaches, and sports analysts feel that recent Aggie defenses have not "earned" the title. Despite this, the university still owns a trademark on the term.

=== Yell Leaders ===
Yell Leaders are five students who lead the crowd in yells during the games. The team consists of three seniors and two juniors elected by the student body. The Yell Leaders take the place of traditional "cheerleaders" and perform many of the same functions without the gymnastics and dance routines. They also participate in post-game activities such as being thrown in the Fish Pond if the team wins, or leading the student body in the singing of The Twelfth Man if the team loses.

== Future opponents ==
=== Non-conference opponents ===
Announced schedules as of October 14, 2026.

2026	2027	2028	2029
Missouri State	Texas State	Louisville	at Louisville
Arizona State	at Arizona State	Abilene Christian	
The Citadel	Texas Southern		

== See also ==
- List of Texas A&M Aggies head football coaches
