= Harry Stiteler =

American athlete and football coach

Biographical details
- Born: September 19, 1909; Smithville, Texas, U.S.
- Died: July 17, 1994 (aged 84); Bryan, Texas, U.S.

Playing career
- 1930: Texas A&M
- Position: Quarterback

Coaching career (HC unless noted)
- 1931–1933: Smithville HS (TX)
- 1934–1937: Bellville HS (TX)
- 1938–1941: Corpus Christi HS (TX)
- 1942–1945: Waco HS (TX)
- 1946: Rice (assistant)
- 1947: Texas A&M (backfield)
- 1948–1950: Texas A&M

Head coaching record
- Overall: 8–21–2 (college)
- Bowls: 1–0

Robert Harry Stiteler (September 19, 1909 – July 17, 1994) was an American athlete and football coach. While attending Texas A&M University, he set a Southwest Conference record in the pole vault and played football at the quarterback position for the Aggies football team in 1930. From 1931 to 1945, Stiteler was a high school football coach in Texas, leading teams from Corpus Christi and Waco to state championships. He was the head football coach at Texas A&M from 1948 to 1950.

== Athlete ==
Stiteler attended Texas A&M University from 1927 to 1931. He lettered in track three times and broke the Southwest Conference record in the pole vault. He tried out for the football team in his senior year and, despite weighing only 137 pounds, became the number two quarterback for the Aggies in 1930.

== Coaching career ==
=== High school football coach ===
After graduating from Texas A&M, Stiteler served as a high school football coach from 1931 to 1945. He began his coaching career at Smithville, Texas (1931–1933), and later coached high school teams in Bellville (1934–1937), Corpus Christi (1938–1941), and Waco (1942–1945). In 15 years as a high school football coach, Stiteler's teams won ten district championships, two regional championships, a Texas state championship with Corpus Christi in 1938, and a tie for another state championship with Waco in 1945. His 1938 Corpus Christi team finished the season 13–0–1, outscored opponents 466–85, and won the state championship in front of 21,000 spectators at the Cotton Bowl. His record from 1934 to 1938 was 55–1–2. He was the president of the Texas High School Coaches Association in 1942.

=== Rice Institute ===
In February 1946, after leading Waco to the Texas football co-championship in 1945, Stiteler was hired by Rice Institute as an assistant football coach. Rice head coach Jess Neely hired Stiteler to fill a vacancy created when backfield coach Buster Brannon resigned to take a position at the University of Florida. Stiteler helped lead the 1946 Rice Owls football team to a 9–2 record and a victory over the Tennessee Volunteers in the Orange Bowl on January 1, 1947.

=== Texas A&M ===
Stiteler returned to his alma mater in July 1947 as the backfield coach for the Texas A&M Aggies football team.

In December 1947, he was hired as the head coach for the Texas A&M football team following the resignation of Homer Norton. In his first season as head coach, the Aggies failed to win a game, accumulating a record of 0–9–1. For the 1949 season, the Aggies won only one game and had a record of 1–8–1. Despite the poor record in his first two seasons, Stiteler developed a reputation as a good recruiter. In 1950, Stiteler turned the program around with a 7–4 record, including impressive wins over Arkansas (42–13) and SMU (25–20) and a 40–20 win over Georgia in the Presidential Cup Bowl at Baltimore. The 1950 team had the best record of any Texas A&M football team in the first decade after World War II (1945–1954).

In December 1950, Stiteler reported that he had been attacked and beaten by a stranger near the Shamrock Hotel in Houston, where Stiteler had been scheduled to address a group of Texas A&M alumni. Stiteler tried to downplay the incident, but the press reported Stiteler declined to provide details to the police and that there were conflicting versions as to what had happened. The San Antonio Light reported the incident under a banner headline, "MYSTERY SHROUDS STITELER BEATING." In March 1951, Stiteler admitted that he had misrepresented the facts concerning the assault. He reported that he had known his attacker and "the affair was a personal one." Stiteler submitted his letter of resignation to the President of Texas A&M upon revealing the true facts concerning "my affair in Houston." Following the resignation, the members of the football team issued a statement in support of their former coach:

"We believe that whatever happened to Mr. Stiteler was a personal matter and it should have remained that. A lot of us boys came to A. and M. in 1948 not because A. and M. had won games but simply because of Harry Stiteler and his character. He has never ceased to set us that same example in the years we have played and worked for him."

In three years as the head coach at Texas A&M, Stiteler compiled a record of 8–21–2.

== Later years ==
As of February 1953, Stiteler was reported to be selling stainless steel in Houston. He died in July 1994.

== Head coaching record ==
=== College ===
Year	Team	Overall	Conference	Standing	Bowl/playoffs
Texas A&M Aggies (Southwest Conference) (1948–1950)
1948	Texas A&M	0–9–1	0–5–1	7th	
1949	Texas A&M	1–8–1	0–5–1	7th	
1950	Texas A&M	7–4	3–3	T–3rd	W Presidential Cup
Texas A&M:		8–21–2	3–13–2		
Total:		8–21–2			
