= W. A. Murray =

American football coach

Coaching career (HC unless noted)
- 1899–1901: Texas A&M

Head coaching record
- Overall: 7–8–1

W. A. Murray was a college football coach. He was the fifth head football coach at Texas A&M University, serving from 1899 to 1901 and compiling a record of 7–8–1.

== Head coaching record ==
Year	Team	Overall	Conference	Standing	Bowl/playoffs
Texas A&M Aggies (Independent) (1899–1901)
1899	Texas A&M	4–2			
1900	Texas A&M	2–2–1			
1901	Texas A&M	1–4			
Texas A&M:		7–8–1			
Total:		7–8–1			
