= Jim Myers =

American football player and coach, college athletics administrator (1921–2014)

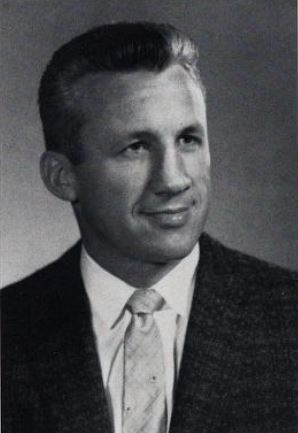

Biographical details
- Born: November 12, 1921; Madison, West Virginia, U.S.
- Died: July 17, 2014 (aged 92); Dallas, Texas, U.S.

Playing career
- 1941–1942: Tennessee
- 1944: Card-Pitt (off-season member)
- 1946: Tennessee
- Position: Guard

Coaching career (HC unless noted)
- 1947: Wofford (line)
- 1948: Vanderbilt (line)
- 1949–1956: UCLA (line)
- 1957: Iowa State
- 1958–1961: Texas A&M
- 1962–1986: Dallas Cowboys (OC/OL)

Head coaching record
- Overall: 16–29–5

James A. Myers (November 12, 1921 – July 17, 2014) was an American football coach. He coached for 40 years at the collegiate and professional level. He is probably most remembered for his time as line coach and (since 1971) associate head coach with the Dallas Cowboys under Tom Landry. He was also an offseason member of the Card-Pitt team in 1944, playing as a guard. Card-Pitt was the contraction of the Cardinals and Steelers teams during World War II and was generally considered one of the worst teams in history, finishing 0–10 and outscored by 220 points.

After serving as line coach under Red Sanders at Vanderbilt University and later University of California, Los Angeles (UCLA), Myers became head coach at Iowa State University in 1957, where he compiled a 4–5–1 record. He then succeeded Bear Bryant in a similar capacity at Texas A&M University in 1958. Myers, the fourth candidate pursued by the Aggies after Duffy Daugherty, his coaching mentor Sanders and Frank Leahy rejected its offers, was approved by both university president Dr. Marion Thomas Harrington and the faculty athletic council. He withdrew his name from consideration when the alumni blocked his appointment in an attempt to land a more high-profile coach and the Board of Regents were recruiting Eddie Erdelatz who eventually spurned them. A telegram of support signed and sent by the student body successfully convinced Myers to reconsider and become the Aggies' head coach. His record in four seasons from 1958 to 1961 was 12–24–4. Myers frequently used a single-wing formation he had learned at Tennessee under head coach Robert Neyland.

Myers was hired by Tom Landry to coach the Dallas Cowboys offensive line in 1962. He was promoted twice, first to offensive coordinator in 1970 and then associate head coach in 1977.

Myers died at the age of 92 on July 17, 2014.

== Head coaching record ==
Year	Team	Overall	Conference	Standing
Iowa State Cyclones (Big Seven Conference) (1957)
1957	Iowa State	4–5–1	2–4	T–5th
Iowa State:		4–5–1	2–4	
Texas A&M Aggies (Southwest Conference) (1958–1961)
1958	Texas A&M	4–6	2–4	T–5th
1959	Texas A&M	3–7	0–6	7th
1960	Texas A&M	1–6–3	0–4–3	7th
1961	Texas A&M	4–5–1	3–4	4th
Texas A&M:		12–24–4	5–18–3	
Total:		16–29–5		
