= Homer Norton =

American football, basketball, and baseball player and coach

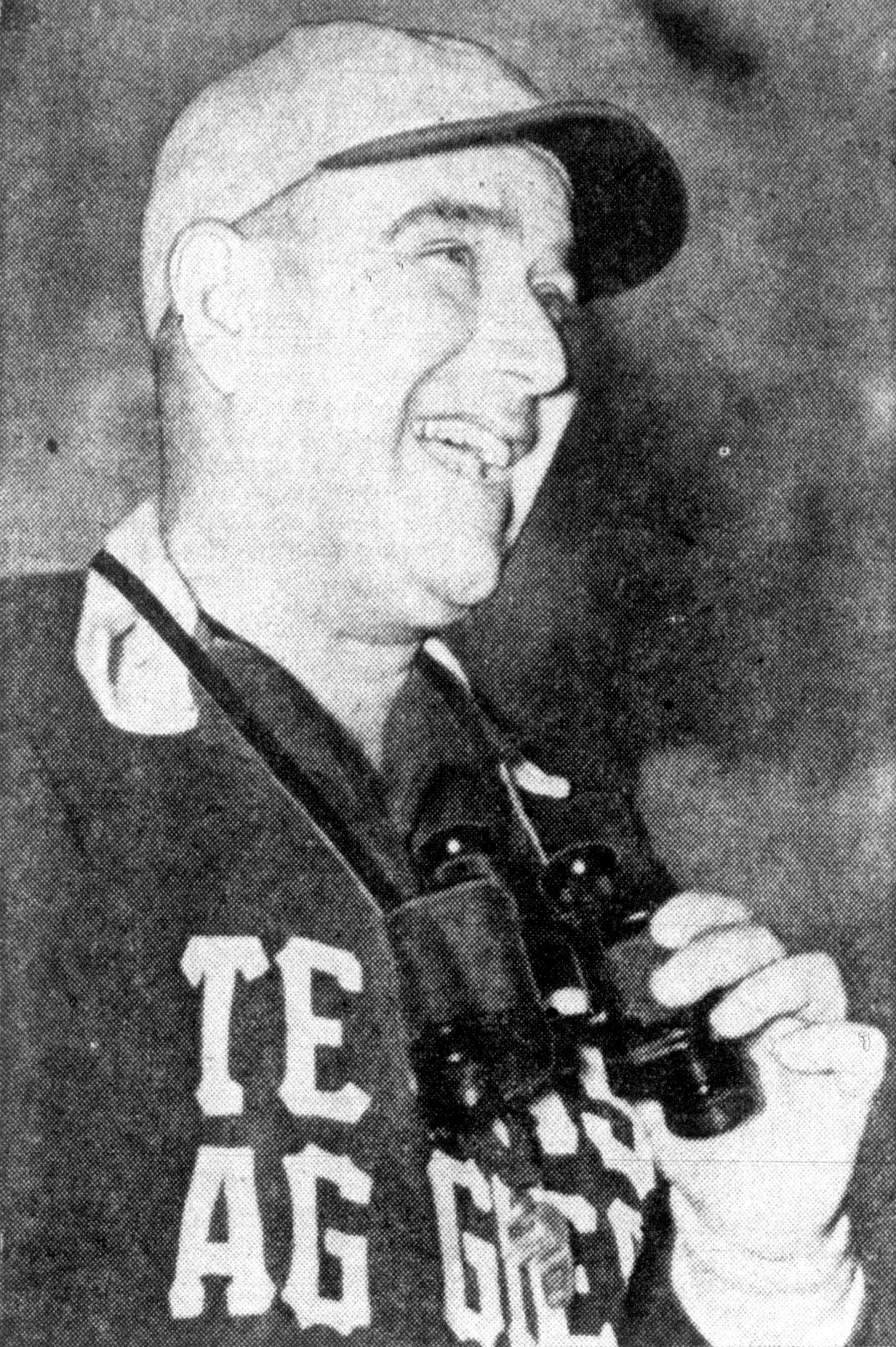
- Norton, circa 1945

Biographical details
- Born: December 30, 1896; Carrollton, Alabama, U.S.
- Died: May 26, 1965 (aged 68); College Station, Texas, U.S.

Playing career

Football
- 1916: Birmingham

Basketball
- 1915–1916: Birmingham

Baseball
- 1916: Birmingham
- 1916–1919: Birmingham Barons
- 1920: Greensboro Patriots
- 1921: Lakeland Highlanders
- Positions: End (football); Outfielder (baseball)

Coaching career (HC unless noted)

Football
- 1919–1921: Centenary
- 1922–1925: Centenary (assistant)
- 1926–1933: Centenary
- 1934–1947: Texas A&M

Basketball
- 1921–1926: Centenary

Baseball
- 1924–1928: Centenary
- 1943–1944: Texas A&M

Head coaching record
- Overall: 143–75–18 (football); 49–43 (basketball); 62–37–1 (baseball)
- Bowls: 2–2–1

Accomplishments and honors

Championships
- Football; 1 National (1939); 2 SIAA (1926–1927); 3 SWC (1939–1941)
- College Football Hall of Fame; Inducted in 1971 (profile)

Homer Hill Norton (December 30, 1896 – May 26, 1965) was an American football, basketball, and baseball player and coach. He served as the head football coach at Centenary College of Louisiana from 1919 to 1921 and 1926 to 1933 and at Texas A&M University from 1934 to 1947, compiling a career college football record of 143–75–18. His 1939 Texas A&M team went 11–0, beating Tulane in the Sugar Bowl, and was named 1939 National Football Champions national champion. Norton's record at Texas A&M was 82–53–9, giving him the second most wins of any coach in Texas A&M Aggies football history. He was fired in 1947 when his team went 3–6–1 and lost to Texas for the eighth straight year. Norton was inducted into the College Football Hall of Fame as a coach in 1971.

Norton played four different sports at Birmingham–Southern College and played minor league baseball with the Birmingham Barons prior to becoming a coach. In addition to football, Norton also coached basketball at Centenary from 1921 to 1926 and baseball at Texas A&M from 1943 to 1944.

Norton died of a heart attack on May 26, 1965, in College Station, Texas.

== Head coaching record ==
=== Football ===
Year	Team	Overall	Conference	Standing	Bowl/playoffs	AP^{#}
Centenary Gentlemen (Independent) (1919–1920)
1919	Centenary	1–3				
1920	Centenary	0–1				
Centenary Gentlemen (Louisiana Intercollegiate Athletic Association) (1921)
1921	Centenary	3–3				
Centenary Gentlemen (Southern Intercollegiate Athletic Association) (1926–1933)
1926	Centenary	6–3	5–0	1st		
1927	Centenary	10–0	4–0	T–1st		
1928	Centenary	6–3–2	2–1–1	T–8th		
1929	Centenary	6–3–1	1–0	T–6th		
1930	Centenary	8–1–1	2–0	T–4th		
1931	Centenary	5–5	3–0	3rd		
1932	Centenary	8–0–1	1–0	6th		
1933	Centenary	8–0–4	3–0	3rd	T Dixie Classic	
Centenary:		61–22–9	21–1–1			
Texas A&M Aggies (Southwest Conference) (1934–1947)
1934	Texas A&M	2–7–2	1–4–1	6th		
1935	Texas A&M	3–7	1–5	7th		
1936	Texas A&M	8–3–1	3–2–1	T–3rd		
1937	Texas A&M	5–2–2	2–2–2	5th		
1938	Texas A&M	4–4–1	2–3–1	5th		
1939	Texas A&M	11–0	6–0	1st	W Sugar	1
1940	Texas A&M	9–1	5–1	T–1st	W Cotton	6
1941	Texas A&M	9–2	5–1	1st	L Cotton	9
1942	Texas A&M	4–5–1	2–3–1	5th		
1943	Texas A&M	7–2–1	4–1	2nd	L Orange	
1944	Texas A&M	7–4	2–3	T–4th		
1945	Texas A&M	6–4	3–3	T–3rd		
1946	Texas A&M	4–6	3–3	4th		
1947	Texas A&M	3–6–1	1–4–1	T–5th		
Texas A&M:		82–53–9	40–35–7			
Total:		143–75–18				
National championship Conference title Conference division title or championship game berth
^{#}Rankings from final AP Poll.
