= J. E. Platt =

American football coach

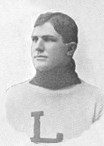
- Platt pictured in The Long Horn 1903, Texas A&M yearbook

Biographical details
- Born: December 11, 1878; Laceyville, Pennsylvania, U.S.

Coaching career (HC unless noted)
- 1902–1904: Texas A&M

Head coaching record
- Overall: 18–5–3

James Edward Platt (December 11, 1878 – ?) was an American college football coach. He was the sixth head football coach at Texas A&M University, serving for three seasons, from 1902 to 1904, and compiling a record of 8–5–3 (.750). Platt was born in Laceyville, Pennsylvania.

== Head coaching record ==
Year	Team	Overall	Conference	Standing	Bowl/playoffs
Texas A&M Aggies (Independent) (1902)
1902	Texas A&M	7–0–2			
Texas A&M Aggies (Southern Intercollegiate Athletic Association) (1903–1904)
1903	Texas A&M	7–3–1	0–1	T–15	
1904	Texas A&M	4–2	0–2	14th	
Texas A&M:		18–5–3	0–3		
Total:		18–5–3			
