= List of Texas A&M Aggies in the NFL draft =

This is a list of Texas A&M Aggies football players in the NFL draft.

== Key ==
= Pro Bowler
= Hall of Famer

B	Back	K	Kicker	T	Tackle
C	Center	LB	Linebacker	FB	Fullback
DB	Defensive back	CB	Cornerback	S	Safety
DE	Defensive end	QB	Quarterback	WR	Wide receiver
DT	Defensive tackle	RB	Running back	G	Guard
E	End	OT	Offensive tackle	TE	Tight end

== Selections ==
Year	Round	Pick	Overall	Name	Team	Position
1938	3	1	16	Joe Routt	Los Angeles Rams	G
1938	7	9	59	Roy Young	Washington Redskins	T
1939	5	4	34	Zed Coston	Philadelphia Eagles	G
1939	5	8	38	Dick Todd	Washington Redskins	B
1939	9	4	74	Rankin Britt	Philadelphia Eagles	E
1939	12	10	110	Bruno Schroeder	New York Giants	E
1940	6	8	48	Joe Boyd	Washington Redskins	T
1941	1	2	2	John Kimbrough	Chicago Cardinals	FB
1941	1	5	5	Jim Thomason	Detroit Lions	B
1941	3	1	16	Marion Pugh	Philadelphia Eagles	QB
1941	6	3	43	Marshall Robnett	Chicago Cardinals	G
1941	16	1	141	Bill Conatser	Philadelphia Eagles	B
1941	16	6	146	Ernie Pannell	Green Bay Packers	T
1941	21	1	201	Charley Henke	Philadelphia Eagles	G
1942	5	10	40	Martin Ruby	Chicago Bears	T
1943	7	5	55	Bill Henderson	Los Angeles Rams	E
1943	16	5	145	Cullen Rogers	Los Angeles Rams	B
1943	19	3	173	Elvis Simmons	Chicago Cardinals	E
1943	19	7	177	Ray Bucek	Pittsburgh Steelers	G
1943	22	7	207	Willie Zapalac	Pittsburgh Steelers	FB
1944	12	1	110	Leo Daniels	Chicago Cardinals	B
1944	30	6	313	Bob Butchofsky	Green Bay Packers	B
1945	3	4	20	Damon Tassos	Boston Yanks	G
1945	29	3	299	Ed Dusek	Chicago Cardinals	B
1945	30	2	309	Otto Payne	Chicago Cardinals	B
1946	6	1	41	Len Dickey	Chicago Cardinals	T
1946	9	6	76	Grant Darnell	Green Bay Packers	G
1946	12	9	109	Monte Moncrief	Washington Redskins	T
1946	16	9	149	Bob Butchofsky	Washington Redskins	B
1946	26	9	249	Marion Flanagan	Washington Redskins	B
1946	28	9	269	Jim Hallmark	Washington Redskins	B
1947	8	7	62	Monte Moncrief	Green Bay Packers	T
1947	19	1	166	Buryl Baty	Detroit Lions	B
1947	27	2	247	Odell Stautzenberger	Boston Yanks	G
1947	29	1	266	Bob Tulis	Detroit Lions	T
1948	15	9	134	Rob Goode	Chicago Bears	RB
1948	31	1	286	Barney Welch	Washington Redskins	B
1949	1	8	8	Rob Goode	Washington Redskins	RB
1949	3	6	27	Jim Winkler	Los Angeles Rams	DT
1949	25	4	245	Bobby Gaff	Pittsburgh Steelers	B
1950	12	2	146	Andy Hillhouse	New York Yanks	E
1951	4	3	41	Bob Smith	Cleveland Browns	FB
1951	16	2	185	Bob Bates	Washington Redskins	C
1952	3	8	33	Billy Tidwell	San Francisco 49ers	B
1952	3	9	34	Yale Lary	Detroit Lions	DB
1952	22	3	256	Glenn Lippman	Chicago Cardinals	B
1952	27	2	315	Sam Moses	Chicago Cardinals	T
1952	27	12	325	Hugh Meyer	Los Angeles Rams	C
1952	29	1	338	Russ Hudeck	New York Yanks	T
1953	5	1	50	Jack Little	Baltimore Colts	T
1953	10	3	112	Darrow Hooper	New York Giants	E
1953	27	1	314	Ray Graves	Baltimore Colts	B
1954	5	4	53	Don Ellis	Baltimore Colts	B
1955	14	7	164	Elwood Kettler	New York Giants	B
1955	29	5	342	Bernie Sinclair	Pittsburgh Steelers	E
1956	8	1	86	Jack Powell	Detroit Lions	T
1957	2	1	14	Jack Pardee	Los Angeles Rams	LB
1957	23	10	275	George Gillar	Detroit Lions	B
1958	1	2	2	John David Crow	Chicago Cardinals	RB
1958	1	9	9	Charlie Krueger	San Francisco 49ers	DT
1958	5	9	58	Bobby Joe Conrad	New York Giants	WR
1958	8	6	91	Bobby Marks	Los Angeles Rams	B
1958	14	8	165	Kenneth Hall	Baltimore Colts	B
1958	17	11	204	Roddy Osbourne	Cleveland Browns	B
1959	4	2	38	Ken Beck	Chicago Cardinals	DT
1959	4	8	44	John Tracey	Los Angeles Rams	LB
1960	14	4	160	Charlie Milstead	Washington Redskins	B
1961	18	12	250	Arthur Sims	Green Bay Packers	B
1963	7	4	88	Lee Roy Caffey	Philadelphia Eagles	LB
1964	4	4	46	Ray Kubala	Philadelphia Eagles	C
1966	8	14	124	Ken McLean	Green Bay Packers	WR
1966	17	15	260	Randy Matson	Baltimore Colts	T
1967	5	13	120	Randy Matson	Atlanta Falcons	T
1967	11	3	266	Jacky Pyburn	Miami Dolphins	T
1967	15	11	378	Ed Breding	Washington Redskins	LB
1967	17	4	432	Larry Lee	Houston Oilers	WR
1968	1	19	19	Mo Moorman	Kansas City Chiefs	G
1969	2	9	35	Rolf Krueger	St. Louis Cardinals	DT
1969	2	25	51	Tom Maxwell	Baltimore Colts	DB
1969	8	2	184	Bill Hobbs	Philadelphia Eagles	LB
1969	12	12	298	Tom Buckman	Green Bay Packers	TE
1969	12	13	299	George Resley	Houston Oilers	DT
1969	13	21	338	Steve O'Neal	New York Jets	P
1969	16	7	397	Edd Hargett	New Orleans Saints	QB
1969	17	15	431	Bob Long	Chicago Bears	WR
1969	17	17	433	Wendell Housely	Minnesota Vikings	RB
1970	1	8	8	Larry Stegent	St. Louis Cardinals	RB
1970	3	9	61	Billy Bob Barnett	Kansas City Chiefs	DE
1970	4	22	100	Ross Brupbacher	Chicago Bears	LB
1970	9	18	226	Barney Harris	Baltimore Colts	DB
1971	3	11	63	Dave Elmendorf	Los Angeles Rams	DB
1971	12	5	291	Jim Sheffield	Buffalo Bills	K
1972	6	19	149	Leonard Forey	Cleveland Browns	G
1972	12	11	297	Doug Neill	Chicago Bears	RB
1972	12	17	303	David Hoot	Los Angeles Rams	DB
1973	3	4	56	Brad Dusek	New England Patriots	LB
1973	9	4	212	David Callaway	New England Patriots	T
1973	11	4	264	Homer May	New England Patriots	TE
1973	14	2	340	Ralph Sacra	Philadelphia Eagles	T
1975	1	21	21	Tim Gray	St. Louis Cardinals	DB
1975	5	11	115	John McCrumbly	Buffalo Bills	LB
1975	7	24	180	James Daniels	Oakland Raiders	DB
1975	17	11	427	Ricky Seeker	Houston Oilers	C
1976	1	9	9	Bubba Bean	Atlanta Falcons	RB
1976	2	10	38	Glenn Bujnoch	Cincinnati Bengals	G
1976	2	11	39	Pat Thomas	Los Angeles Rams	DB
1976	3	21	81	Ed Simonini	Baltimore Colts	LB
1976	7	13	195	Jackie Williams	Buffalo Bills	DB
1976	7	16	198	Garth TenNapel	Detroit Lions	LB
1976	9	1	238	Bruce Welch	Tampa Bay Buccaneers	G
1976	9	11	248	Richard Osborne	Philadelphia Eagles	TE
1976	11	20	311	Alvin Walker	Houston Oilers	RB
1976	14	2	377	Carl Roaches	Tampa Bay Buccaneers	WR
1977	1	17	17	Robert Jackson	Cleveland Browns	LB
1977	2	27	55	Dennis Swilley	Minnesota Vikings	C
1977	3	7	63	Edgar Fields	St. Louis Cardinals	DT
1977	3	16	72	Tank Marshall	New York Jets	DE
1977	4	2	86	Jimmy Dean	Buffalo Bills	DT
1977	5	14	126	Lester Hayes	Oakland Raiders	DB
1978	5	7	117	Frank Myers	Baltimore Colts	T
1978	10	24	274	Mark Dennard	Miami Dolphins	C
1978	11	19	297	Mike Williams	Washington Redskins	DB
1979	3	18	74	Tony Franklin	Philadelphia Eagles	K
1979	7	18	183	Cody Risien	Cleveland Browns	T
1979	8	25	217	Gene Sanders	Tampa Bay Buccaneers	G
1980	1	5	5	Curtis Dickey	Baltimore Colts	RB
1980	1	10	10	Jacob Green	Seattle Seahawks	DE
1980	9	19	240	Gerald Carter	Tampa Bay Buccaneers	WR
1980	11	12	289	George Woodard	New Orleans Saints	RB
1980	11	13	290	James Zachery	New York Jets	LB
1981	3	20	76	Mike Mosley	Buffalo Bills	WR
1981	6	14	152	Mack Moore	Miami Dolphins	DE
1982	2	4	31	Keith Baldwin	Cleveland Browns	DE
1982	6	23	162	Mike Whitwell	Cleveland Browns	WR
1983	2	23	51	Johnny Hector	New York Jets	RB
1983	8	1	197	Gary Kubiak	Denver Broncos	QB
1983	8	6	202	Earnest Jackson	San Diego Chargers	RB
1984	1	25	25	Billy Cannon Jr.	Dallas Cowboys	LB
1984	5	22	134	Jeff Paine	Kansas City Chiefs	LB
1984	5	27	139	Jeff Fuller	San Francisco 49ers	DB
1984	6	5	145	Keith Guthrie	San Diego Chargers	DT
1984	9	4	228	Don Jones	Cleveland Browns	WR
1984s	2	22	50	Tommy Robison	Cleveland Browns	T
1985	1	3	3	Ray Childress	Houston Oilers	DT
1985	5	7	119	Matt Darwin	Dallas Cowboys	C
1985	5	18	130	Jimmy Teal	Buffalo Bills	WR
1985	6	15	155	Mark Lewis	Green Bay Packers	TE
1985	6	16	156	Ken Reeves	Philadelphia Eagles	T
1985	9	26	250	Thomas Sanders	Chicago Bears	RB
1986	2	10	36	Anthony Toney	Philadelphia Eagles	RB
1986	2	22	49	Doug Williams	New York Jets	T
1986	4	24	106	Matt Darwin	Philadelphia Eagles	C
1986	6	10	148	Domingo Bryant	Pittsburgh Steelers	DB
1986	9	18	239	Wayne Asberry	Washington Redskins	DB
1986	11	15	292	Randy Dausin	Cleveland Browns	RB
1987	1	21	21	Roger Vick	New York Jets	FB
1987	1	24	24	Rod Bernstine	Denver Broncos	RB
1987	2	13	41	Johnny Holland	Green Bay Packers	LB
1987	3	17	73	Todd Howard	Kansas City Chiefs	LB
1987	4	6	90	Rod Saddler	St. Louis Cardinals	DT
1987	4	24	108	Larry Kelm	Los Angeles Rams	LB
1987	8	25	220	Steve Bullitt	Cleveland Browns	LB
1987	12	7	314	Ira Valentine	Houston Oilers	RB
1988	3	6	61	Keith Woodside	Green Bay Packers	RB
1988	8	27	220	Louis Cheek	Miami Dolphins	T
1988	9	2	223	Kip Corrington	Detroit Lions	DB
1988	11	26	303	Chet Brooks	San Francisco 49ers	DB
1989	2	8	36	John Roper	Chicago Bears	LB
1989	3	9	65	Jerry Fontenot	Chicago Bears	G
1989	4	20	104	Rod Harris	Houston Oilers	WR
1989	9	9	232	Dana Batiste	Detroit Lions	LB
1989	10	14	265	Adam Bob	New York Jets	LB
1990	1	9	9	Richmond Webb	Miami Dolphins	T
1990	2	12	37	Aaron Wallace	Los Angeles Raiders	DE
1990	3	1	54	Mike L. Jones	Minnesota Vikings	TE
1990	4	1	82	Jeroy Robinson	Denver Broncos	LB
1990	4	25	106	Rick Cunningham	Indianapolis Colts	G
1990	8	6	199	Mickey Washington	Phoenix Cardinals	DB
1990	9	19	239	Gary Jones	Pittsburgh Steelers	DB
1990	10	7	255	Terry Price	Chicago Bears	DE
1991	3	25	80	Robert Wilson	Tampa Bay Buccaneers	RB
1991	4	21	104	William Thomas	Philadelphia Eagles	LB
1991	5	19	130	Mike Arthur	Cincinnati Bengals	C
1991	6	20	159	Dennis Ransom	Washington Redskins	TE
1991	6	22	161	Darren Lewis	Chicago Bears	RB
1991	8	22	217	Larry Horton	Chicago Bears	DB
1991	9	18	241	Shane Garrett	Cincinnati Bengals	WR
1992	1	2	2	Quentin Coryatt	Indianapolis Colts	LB
1992	1	17	17	Kevin Smith	Dallas Cowboys	DB
1992	3	3	59	Mark Wheeler	Tampa Bay Buccaneers	DT
1992	5	2	114	Chris Crooms	Los Angeles Rams	DB
1992	6	24	164	Kary Vincent	New Orleans Saints	DB
1992	8	24	220	Bucky Richardson	Houston Oilers	QB
1992	9	19	243	Keith Alex	Atlanta Falcons	T
1992	11	5	285	Keith McAfee	San Diego Chargers	RB
1993	1	12	12	Patrick Bates	Los Angeles Raiders	DB
1993	3	10	66	Marcus Buckley	New York Giants	LB
1993	3	19	75	Derrick Frazier	Philadelphia Eagles	DB
1994	1	8	8	Sam Adams	Seattle Seahawks	DT
1994	1	12	12	Aaron Glenn	New York Jets	DB
1994	1	25	25	Greg Hill	Kansas City Chiefs	RB
1994	3	2	67	Jason Mathews	Indianapolis Colts	T
1994	3	24	89	Eric England	Arizona Cardinals	DE
1994	7	2	196	Lance Teichelman	Indianapolis Colts	DT
1995	3	25	89	Rodney Thomas	Houston Oilers	RB
1995	6	30	201	Antonio Armstrong	San Francisco 49ers	DE
1996	1	17	17	Reggie Brown	Detroit Lions	LB
1996	2	2	32	Leeland McElroy	Arizona Cardinals	RB
1996	3	1	62	Ray Mickens	New York Jets	DB
1996	3	4	65	Detron Smith	Denver Broncos	FB
1996	4	2	97	Hunter Goodwin	Minnesota Vikings	TE
1996	6	34	201	Hayward Clay	St. Louis Rams	TE
1997	2	29	59	Brandon Mitchell	New England Patriots	DE
1997	4	19	115	Albert Connell	Washington Redskins	WR
1997	6	17	180	Calvin Collins	Atlanta Falcons	C
1997	6	35	198	Ed Jasper	Philadelphia Eagles	DT
1998	3	28	89	Chris Ruhman	San Francisco 49ers	T
1998	4	1	93	Steve McKinney	Indianapolis Colts	C
1999	3	5	66	Rex Tucker	Chicago Bears	G
1999	3	7	68	Rich Coady	St. Louis Rams	DB
1999	3	18	79	Dan Campbell	New York Giants	TE
1999	3	24	85	Dat Nguyen	Dallas Cowboys	LB
1999	4	11	106	Warrick Holdman	Chicago Bears	LB
1999	5	12	145	Cameron Spikes	St. Louis Rams	G
2000	2	17	48	Jason Webster	San Francisco 49ers	DB
2000	3	8	70	Chris Cole	Denver Broncos	WR
2000	5	13	142	Shane Lechler	Oakland Raiders	P
2000	5	24	153	Dante Hall	Kansas City Chiefs	WR
2001	2	10	41	Robert Ferguson	Green Bay Packers	WR
2001	3	14	76	Ron Edwards	Buffalo Bills	DT
2001	6	2	165	Michael Jameson	Cleveland Browns	DB
2001	6	10	173	Jason Glenn	Detroit Lions	LB
2001	7	18	218	Chris Taylor	Pittsburgh Steelers	WR
2001	7	26	226	Ronald Flemons	Atlanta Falcons	DE
2002	3	25	90	Seth McKinney	Miami Dolphins	C
2002	5	11	146	Rocky Bernard	Seattle Seahawks	DT
2003	1	13	13	Ty Warren	New England Patriots	DT
2003	1	30	30	Sammy Davis	San Diego Chargers	DB
2003	2	13	45	Bethel Johnson	New England Patriots	WR
2003	2	30	62	Terrence Kiel	San Diego Chargers	DB
2003	3	23	87	Taylor Whitley	Miami Dolphins	G
2003	7	19	233	Chance Pearce	Houston Texans	C
2004	6	3	168	Jamaar Taylor	New York Giants	WR
2005	2	26	58	Terrence Murphy	Green Bay Packers	WR
2005	5	33	169	Geoff Hangartner	Carolina Panthers	C
2005	6	6	180	Michael Montgomery	Green Bay Packers	DE
2006	6	14	183	Johnny Jolly	Green Bay Packers	DT
2006	6	24	193	Reggie McNeal	Cincinnati Bengals	QB
2008	2	30	61	Martellus Bennett	Dallas Cowboys	TE
2008	4	8	107	Cody Wallace	San Francisco 49ers	C
2008	4	22	121	Red Bryant	Seattle Seahawks	DT
2008	6	19	185	Chris Harrington	Arizona Cardinals	DE
2008	7	27	234	Corey Clark	San Diego Chargers	T
2009	4	1	101	Stephen McGee	Dallas Cowboys	QB
2009	4	11	111	Mike Goodson	Carolina Panthers	RB
2010	6	33	202	Jordan Pugh	Carolina Panthers	DB
2011	1	2	2	Von Miller	Denver Broncos	LB
2012	1	8	8	Ryan Tannehill	Miami Dolphins	QB
2012	5	26	161	Randy Bullock	Houston Texans	K
2012	6	12	182	Cyrus Gray	Kansas City Chiefs	RB
2012	7	39	246	Terrence Frederick	Pittsburgh Steelers	DB
2013	1	2	2	Luke Joeckel	Jacksonville Jaguars	T
2013	2	30	62	Christine Michael	Seattle Seahawks	RB
2013	3	19	81	Damontre Moore	New York Giants	DE
2013	4	21	118	Sean Porter	Cincinnati Bengals	LB
2013	6	6	174	Ryan Swope	Arizona Cardinals	WR
2014	1	6	6	Jake Matthews	Atlanta Falcons	T
2014	1	7	7	Mike Evans	Tampa Bay Buccaneers	WR
2014	1	22	22	Johnny Manziel	Cleveland Browns	QB
2015	1	21	21	Cedric Ogbuehi	Cincinnati Bengals	T
2015	5	16	152	Jarvis Harrison	New York Jets	G
2016	1	31	31	Germain Ifedi	Seattle Seahawks	T
2016	3	30	92	Brandon Williams	Arizona Cardinals	DB
2016	6	4	179	Drew Kaser	San Diego Chargers	P
2017	1	1	1	Myles Garrett	Cleveland Browns	DE
2017	2	18	50	Justin Evans	Tampa Bay Buccaneers	DB
2017	3	13	77	Daeshon Hall	Carolina Panthers	DE
2017	4	10	117	Josh Reynolds	Los Angeles Rams	WR
2017	5	15	159	Jermaine Eluemunor	Baltimore Ravens	G
2018	2	15	47	Christian Kirk	Arizona Cardinals	WR
2018	4	24	124	Armani Watts	Kansas City Chiefs	DB
2018	6	1	175	Damion Ratley	Cleveland Browns	WR
2019	2	16	48	Erik McCoy	New Orleans Saints	C
2019	3	11	75	Jace Sternberger	Green Bay Packers	TE
2019	4	12	150	Kingsley Keke	Green Bay Packers	DT
2019	4	22	160	Daylon Mack	Baltimore Ravens	DT
2019	6	9	182	Trayveon Williams	Cincinnati Bengals	RB
2019	6	40	213	Donovan Wilson	Dallas Cowboys	DB
2019	7	6	220	Cullen Gillaspia	Houston Texans	FB
2020	3	7	71	Justin Madubuike	Baltimore Ravens	DT
2020	6	12	191	Braden Mann	New York Jets	P
2021	3	2	66	Kellen Mond	Minnesota Vikings	QB
2021	4	12	117	Bobby Brown III	Los Angeles Rams	DT
2021	4	21	128	Dan Moore	Pittsburgh Steelers	T
2021	4	35	140	Buddy Johnson	Pittsburgh Steelers	LB
2022	1	15	15	Kenyon Green	Houston Texans	G
2022	3	20	84	DeMarvin Leal	Pittsburgh Steelers	DE
2022	4	12	117	Micheal Clemons	New York Jets	DE
2022	4	18	123	Isaiah Spiller	Los Angeles Chargers	RB
2023	3	21	84	De’Von Achane	Miami Dolphins	RB
2023	5	25	160	Antonio Johnson	Jacksonville Jaguars	DB
2023	7	4	221	Jaylon Jones	Indianapolis Colts	DB
2024	2	13	45	Edgerrin Cooper	Green Bay Packers	LB
2024	3	33	97	McKinnley Jackson	Cincinnati Bengals	DT
2024	4	3	103	Layden Robinson	New England Patriots	G
2024	5	17	152	Ainias Smith	Philadelphia Eagles	WR
2025	1	17	17	Shemar Stewart	Cincinnati Bengals	DE
2025	2	19	51	Nic Scourton	Carolina Panthers	DE
2025	2	30	62	Shemar Turner	Chicago Bears	DT
2026	1	24	24	KC Concepcion	Cleveland Browns	WR
2026	2	2	34	Chase Bisontis	Arizona Cardinals	G
2026	2	9	41	Cashius Howell	Cincinnati Bengals	DE
2026	2	24	56	Nate Boerkircher	Jacksonville Jaguars	TE
2026	3	2	66	Tyler Onyedim	Denver Broncos	DE
2026	3	17	81	Albert Regis	Jacksonville Jaguars	DT
2026	3	27	91	Trey Zuhn III	Las Vegas Raiders	C
2026	4	29	129	Will Lee III	Carolina Panthers	CB
2026	6	15	196	Dametrious Crownover	New England Patriots	T
2026	7	25	241	Ar'maj Reed-Adams	Buffalo Bills	G

== Notable undrafted players ==
Debut Year	Player	Debut Team	Position	Notes
1963	Mike Clark	Philadelphia Eagles	K	—
1965	Danny McIlhany	Los Angeles Rams	CB	—
1966	Joe Wellborn	New York Giants	C	—
1968	Grady Allen	Atlanta Falcons	LB	—
1979	Adger Armstrong	Dallas Cowboys	FB	—
1979	Russ Mikeska	Atlanta Falcons	TE	—
1983	David Hardy	Seattle Seahawks	K	—
1987	Rich Siler	Miami Dolphins	TE	—
1995	Jeff Jones	Detroit Lions	OT	—
1995	James McKeehan	Seattle Seahawks	TE	—
1997	Keith Mitchell	New Orleans Saints	LB	—
1997	Pat Williams	Buffalo Bills	DT	—
2000	Brandon Jennings	Oakland Raiders	CB	—
2004	Don Muhlbach	Baltimore Ravens	LS	—
2007	Melvin Bullitt	Indianapolis Colts	S	—
2009	Michael Bennett	Seattle Seahawks	DT	—
2009	Danny Gorrer	New Orleans Saints	CB	—
2009	Cyril Obiozor	Green Bay Packers	LB	—
2010	Kevin Matthews	Tennessee Titans	C	—
2015	Josh Lambo	San Diego Chargers	K	—
2018	Keith Ford	Buffalo Bills	RB	—
2019	Landis Durham	Los Angeles Rams	LB	—
2025	Moose Muhammad III	Carolina Panthers	WR	—
2025	Jahdae Walker	Chicago Bears	WR	—
2025	Tre Watson	Kansas City Chiefs	TE	—
2026	Tyreek Chappell	Minnesota Vikings	CB	—
2026	Le'Veon Moss	Miami Dolphins	RB	—
2026	E. J. Smith	Kansas City Chiefs	RB	—
2026	Scooby Williams	Minnesota Vikings	LB	—
2026	Taurean York	Denver Broncos	LB	—
