= 1991 Texas A&M Aggies football team =

American college football season

1991 Texas A&M Aggies football

SWC champion

Cotton Bowl Classic, L 2–10 vs. Florida State
- Conference: Southwest Conference

Ranking
- Coaches: No. 13
- AP: No. 12
- Record: 10–2 (8–0 SWC)
- Head coach: R. C. Slocum (3rd season)
- Offensive coordinator: Bob Toledo (3rd season)
- Offensive scheme: West Coast
- Defensive coordinator: Bob Davie (3rd season)
- Base defense: 3–4
- Home stadium: Kyle Field

1991 Southwest Conference football standings
	Conf.					Overall
Team	W		L		T	W		L		T
No. 12 Texas A&M $	8	–	0	–	0	10	–	2	–	0
Baylor	5	–	3	–	0	8	–	4	–	0
Texas Tech	5	–	3	–	0	6	–	5	–	0
Arkansas	5	–	3	–	0	6	–	6	–	0
TCU	4	–	4	–	0	7	–	4	–	0
Texas	4	–	4	–	0	5	–	6	–	0
Houston	3	–	5	–	0	4	–	7	–	0
Rice	2	–	6	–	0	4	–	7	–	0
SMU	0	–	8	–	0	1	–	10	–	0
$ – Conference champion; Rankings from AP Poll

The 1991 Texas A&M Aggies football team represented Texas A&M University as a member of the Southwest Conference (SWC) during the 1991 NCAA Division I-A football season. Led by third-year head coach R. C. Slocum, the Aggies compiled an overall record of 10–2 with a mark of 8–0 in conference play, winning the SWC title. Texas A&M earned a berth in the Cotton Bowl Classic, where the Aggies lost to Florida State. The team was ranked No. 12 in the final AP poll and No. 13 in the final Coaches Poll. Texas A&M played home games at Kyle Field in College Station, Texas.

== Schedule ==
Date	Time	Opponent	Rank	Site	TV	Result	Attendance	Source
September 14	12:00 p.m.	LSU*	No. 20	Kyle Field; College Station, TX (rivalry)	Raycom	W 45–7	66,281	
September 21	12:00 p.m.	at Tulsa*	No. 15	Skelly Stadium; Tulsa, OK	Raycom	L 34–35	30,122	
September 28	6:00 p.m.	Southwestern Louisiana*		Kyle Field; College Station, TX		W 34–7	56,271	
October 5	12:00 p.m.	at Texas Tech	No. 23	Jones Stadium; Lubbock, TX (rivalry)	Raycom	W 37–14	50,577	
October 19	2:30 p.m.	at No. 16 Baylor	No. 19	Floyd Casey Stadium; Waco, TX (Battle of the Brazos)	ABC	W 34–12	50,267	
October 26	2:00 p.m.	Houston	No. 13	Kyle Field; College Station, TX	PPV	W 27–18	65,812	
November 2	2:00 p.m.	at Rice	No. 12	Rice Stadium; Houston, TX		W 38–21	42,600	
November 7	7:00 p.m.	at TCU	No. 12	Amon G. Carter Stadium; Fort Worth, TX (rivalry)	ESPN	W 44–7	27,762	
November 16	6:30 p.m.	Arkansas	No. 13	Kyle Field; College Station, TX (rivalry)	ESPN	W 13–3	62,487	
November 23	2:00 p.m.	SMU	No. 12	Kyle Field; College Station, TX		W 65–6	52,523	
November 28	7:00 p.m.	Texas	No. 10	Kyle Field; College Station, TX (rivalry)	ESPN	W 31–14	76,532	
January 1	12:30 p.m.	vs. No. 5 Florida State*	No. 9	Cotton Bowl; Dallas, TX (Cotton Bowl Classic)	CBS	L 2–10	73,728	
*Non-conference game; Rankings from AP Poll released prior to the game; All times are in Central time; Source:

== Game summaries ==
=== LSU ===
Greg Hill ran for 216 yards and 2 TDs on the way to a 45–7 rout of the LSU Tigers. The Wrecking Crew held LSU to 31 net yards rushing in the game led by Quentin Coryatt and Chris Crooms who logged 8 tackles each. Patrick Bates had 2 INTs as the Aggies crushed the Tigers in Kyle Field. J Elliott was the 12th Man for the game.Official NCAA Scoresheet

	1	2	3	4	Total
LSU	0	0	0	7	7
#20 Texas A&M	7	28	3	7	45

=== Tulsa ===
	1	2	3	4	Total
#15 Texas A&M					0
Tulsa					0

=== Southwestern Louisiana ===
	1	2	3	4	Total
Southwestern Louisiana	7				7
Texas A&M	34				34

=== Texas Tech ===
	1	2	3	4	Total
#23 Texas A&M	0	0	3	3	6
Texas Tech	7	10	14	10	41

=== Baylor ===
	1	2	3	4	Total
#19 Texas A&M					0
#16 Baylor					0

=== Houston ===
	1	2	3	4	Total
Houston					0
#13 Texas A&M					0

=== Rice ===
	1	2	3	4	Total
#12 Texas A&M	0	0	14	0	14
Rice	21	3	10	16	50

=== TCU ===
	1	2	3	4	Total
#12 Texas A&M	17	14	6	7	44
TCU	0	7	0	0	7

=== Arkansas ===
This was the final game played between Arkansas and Texas A&M until the 2009 rivalry renewal.

	1	2	3	4	Total
Arkansas					0
#13 Texas A&M					0

=== SMU ===
	1	2	3	4	Total
SMU					0
#12 Texas A&M					0

=== Texas ===
	1	2	3	4	Total
Texas	0	7	0	7	14
#10 Texas A&M	7	3	14	7	31

=== Florida State ===
Quentin Coryatt accounted for the only Aggie score with a safety sack of Casey Weldon in the first quarter.

	1	2	3	4	Total
#5 Florida State	7	0	0	3	10
#9 Texas A&M	2	0	0	0	2

== Roster ==
1991 Texas A&M Aggies football team roster
Players
Coaches
Offense

Pos.	#	Name	Class
RB	27	Greg Hill
QB	7	Bucky Richardson	Sr

Defense

Pos.	#	Name	Class
DT	95	Sam Adams
FS	29	Patrick Bates
LB	9	Marcus Buckley
LB	44	Quentin Coryatt	Sr
SS	6	Chris Crooms
CB	3	Derrick Frazier
CB	26	Kevin Smith
DT	97	Mark Wheeler

Special teams

Pos.	#	Name	Class
FB	45	Derek Hall

Head coach

- R. C. Slocum

Coordinators/assistant coaches

Legend

- (C) Team captain
- (S) Suspended
- (I) Ineligible
- Injured
- Redshirt
