= Jeff Granger =

American baseball player (born 1971)

- Pitcher
- Born: December 16, 1971 (age 54); San Pedro, California, U.S.
- Batted: Right Threw: Left

MLB debut
- September 16, 1993, for the Kansas City Royals

Last MLB appearance
- April 25, 1997, for the Pittsburgh Pirates

MLB statistics
- Win–loss record: 0–1
- Earned run average: 9.09
- Strikeouts: 19
- Stats at Baseball Reference

Teams
- Kansas City Royals (1993–1996); Pittsburgh Pirates (1997)
Medals
Men's baseball
Representing United States
Pan American Games
Bronze medal – third place	1991 Havana	Team

Jeffery Adam Granger (born December 16, 1971) is an American former professional baseball pitcher who played for the Kansas City Royals and the Pittsburgh Pirates of Major League Baseball (MLB).

== High school ==
Granger was a star quarterback and pitcher for Orangefield High School in Orangefield, Texas. In 1990, his senior year, he led the Orangefield Bobcats to the state semifinals with a 23–6 record. Also an outstanding hitter, he still holds the Texas state record for longest hitting streak (42 games). In football, he was named the #6 Texas high school prospect in the class of 1990 by the Austin American-Statesman, and the #2 quarterback overall.

Still owns the Orangefield 400m school record with a sub 50 second performance.

== College ==
In two seasons for Texas A&M Granger had a record of 16–6 with 251 strikeouts in 220 innings during his first two seasons. In 1993, he broke the Aggie record with 150 strikeouts and broke Roger Clemens' Southwest Conference career strikeout record. He was the College Station Regional MVP in the College World Series, and was all-SWC as well as being named a first team All-American. Granger was a finalist for the Golden Spikes award and also pitched for Team USA in international play.

He also played quarterback for the Texas A&M Aggies football team, and was briefly the starter. Highlights included a 4 TD performance against Tulsa playing in place of an injured Bucky Richardson in 1991. Granger engineered two memorable last-minute drives in 1992. After being pulled from the season opening Disneyland Pigskin Classic game against Stanford for a weak passing performance, he returned to throw a game-tying pass to tight end Greg Schorp. On a subsequent drive, he scrambled 33 yards to the Cardinal 29 yard line to set up a game-winning field goal by Terry Venetoulias as the Aggies prevailed 10–7. Granger led the Aggies to a 4–0 start that season, and top 5 early season ranking. Later against Texas Tech, Granger escaped a sack on a third-and-eight at the Raiders' 42-yard line and hit Schorp with a first-down pass that set up another Venetoulias game-winning field goal as time expired.

== Professional career ==
Granger was drafted in the 1st Round (5th overall pick) of the 1993 MLB draft by the Kansas City Royals. He was only 21 when he broke into the majors with the Royals in September of that same year after only 7 impressive starts at single-A Eugene in which he struck out 56 batters in only 36 innings. He began the 1994 Season at AA Memphis and was called up to the big leagues for two respectable (but not overpowering) starts in May. Although he had dominated at the minor league level, it was clear that he needed some finesse to complement his impressive velocity, and the Royals kept him at AA Wichita in 1995. Granger was moved to the bullpen the following season and made a smooth transition, compiling an impressive 2.34 ERA for the AAA Omaha Royals. He was once again hit hard in 15 relief appearances for the major league club. In December 1996, Granger was traded with Jeff Wallace, Joe Randa, and Jeff Martin to the Pittsburgh Pirates for Jeff King and Jay Bell.

Granger began the 1997 season with the Pirates, but was shelled in 9 relief appearances and sent down to AAA Calgary, where he struggled for the rest of the season. It was his last major league action.

Granger spent the next three seasons struggling in the minor leagues for five different clubs in four different organizations. He even attempted to resurrect his career with the Long Island Ducks, but ultimately retired from baseball. Although he was a phenomenal two-sport college athlete and was able to play four seasons in the major leagues, he did not end up being the major-league All-star that some envisioned him becoming, instead a cautionary tale against rushing players to the major leagues.
