= 1992 All-Southwest Conference football team =

American college football all-star team

The 1992 All-Southwest Conference football team consists of American football players chosen by various organizations for All-Southwest Conference teams for the 1992 NCAA Division I-A football season. The selectors for the 1992 season included the Associated Press (AP).

== Offensive selections ==
=== Quarterbacks ===
- Bert Emanuel, Rice (AP-1)
- Jimmy Klingler, Houston (2nd)

=== Running backs ===
- Greg Hill, Texas A&M (AP-1)
- Trevor Cobb, Rice (AP-1)
- Bam Morris, Texas Tech (2nd)

=== Tight ends ===
- Greg Schorp, Texas A&M (AP-1)

=== Wide receivers ===
- Lloyd Hill, Texas Tech (AP-1)
- Melvin Bonner, Baylor (AP-1)
- Sherman Smith, Houston (1st)
- Jimmy Lee, Rice (2nd)
- Freddie Gilbert, Houston (2nd)

=== Tackles ===
- Charlie Biggurs, Texas Tech (AP-1)
- Derrick Clapp, Houston (AP-1)
- Billy Baldwin, Rice (2nd)

=== Guards ===
- John Ellisor, Texas A&M (AP-1)
- Alan Luther, Texas (AP-1)
- Jason Youngblood, Houston (1st)
- Mike Appelbaum, Rice (2nd)
- David Leaks, Baylor (2nd)
- Stance Labaj, Texas Tech (2nd)

=== Centers ===
- Chris Dausin, Texas A&M (AP-1)
- Turk Mcdonald, Texas (2nd)

== Defensive selections ==
=== Defensive lineman ===
- Albert Fontenot, Baylor (AP-1)
- Sam Adams, Texas A&M (AP-1)
- Bo Robinson, Texas (AP-1)
- Lance Teichelman, Texas A&M (AP-1)
- Shawn Jackson, Texas Tech (2nd)
- Chad Patton, SMU (2nd)
- Allen Aldridge, Houston (2nd)
- Matt Sign, Rice (2nd)

=== Linebackers ===
- Marcus Buckley, Texas A&M (AP-1)
- Ryan McCoy, Houston (AP-1)
- Le'Shai Maston, Baylor (AP-1)
- Winfred Tubbs, Texas (2nd)
- Mike Liscio, Texas Tech (2nd)
- Emmett Waldron, Rice (2nd)
- Eric Blount, Houston (2nd)

=== Secondary ===
- Aaron Glenn, Texas A&M (AP-1)
- Tracy Saul, Texas Tech (AP-1)
- Patrick Bates, Texas A&M (AP-1)
- Lance Gunn, Texas (AP-1)
- Tony Rand, TCU (2nd)
- Greg W. Brown, Houston (2nd)
- Greg Evans, TCU (2nd)
- Sean Washington, Rice (2nd)

== Special teams ==
=== Placekickers ===
- Terry Venetoulias, Texas A&M (AP-1)

=== Punters ===
- David Davis, Texas A&M (AP-1)

== Miscellaneous ==
- Offensive Player of the Year: Lloyd Hill, Texas Tech (AP-1)
- Defensive Player of the Year: Marcus Buckley, Texas A&M (AP)
- Coaches of the Year: Tom Rossley, SMU and R. C. Slocum, Texas A&M (AP)
- Offensive Newcomer of the Year: Bert Emanuel, Rice (AP)
- Defensive Newcomers of the Year: Lenoy Jones, TCU and Aaron Glenn, Texas A&M (AP)

== Key ==
AP = Associated Press

== See also ==
1992 College Football All-America Team
