= 1992 Cotton Bowl Classic =

College football bowl game

1992 Mobil Cotton Bowl Classic
- 56th Cotton Bowl Classic
- The Cotton Bowl in Dallas, Texas, hosted the Cotton Bowl Classic.
Florida State Seminoles	Texas A&M Aggies
(10–2)	(10–1)
Independent	SWC
10	2
Head coach: Bobby Bowden	Head coach: R. C. Slocum
AP / Coaches; 5 / 6	AP / Coaches; 9 / 9
	1	2	3	4	Total
Florida State	7	0	0	3	10
Texas A&M	2	0	0	0	2
- Date: January 1, 1992
- Season: 1991
- Stadium: Cotton Bowl
- Location: Dallas, Texas
- MVP: RB Sean Jackson (Florida State); S Chris Crooms (Texas A&M)
- Favorite: Florida State by 7.5
- Referee: Jack Baker (WAC)
- Attendance: 73,728

United States TV coverage
- Network: CBS
- Announcers: Jim Nantz and Terry Bradshaw

The 1992 Cotton Bowl Classic featured the Florida State Seminoles and the Texas A&M Aggies. Florida State won 10–2 in bad weather that led the teams to combine for 13 turnovers.

== Background ==
The Aggies were the Southwest Conference champions for the first time since 1987, and they had done it with a perfect 8–0 record in conference. A Tulsa loss early in the season was their only one in the regular season as they bounced back to play in the Cotton Bowl for the first time since 1988.

Florida State was the preseason #1 team, and they had stayed #1 for ten weeks until their one-point loss to Miami. A five-point loss to Florida the next week removed them from national title contention. The Seminoles looked for consolation in this game and head coach Bobby Bowden looked to win his seventh consecutive bowl game.

== Game summary ==
Rain turned out to be the enemy for the Aggies, who could only muster a safety after Quentin Coryatt sacked Casey Weldon five minutes into the game. But the Seminoles responded eight minutes later with a Weldon touchdown run that had been set up by a fumble recovery by Clifton Abraham. The game was marred by missed opportunities and 13 turnovers, which tied a bowl record. With 2:40 to go, Gerry Thomas would seal A&M's fate with a 27-yard field goal, making the final score 10–2. This was the first Cotton Bowl Classic to have a team's only score be a safety since the 1981 Cotton Bowl Classic. Sean Jackson rushed for 119 yards on 27 carries for the Seminoles and Chris Crooms had two interceptions for A&M, and both were named MVP.

== Aftermath ==
Florida State moved up one position in the final AP poll for the season, ending at #4. Texas A&M lost three rankings, falling to #12.

The Seminoles would move to the Atlantic Coast Conference in 1992 and was in position for another shot at the championship before another loss to Miami knocked them out of contention. A&M would go to three more Cotton Bowls before the decade ended but lose all three.

== Statistics ==
Statistics	FSU	A&M
First downs	17	12
Yards rushing	188	123
Yards passing	92	57
Total yards	280	180
Punts-Average	8-43.3	9-39.7
Fumbles-Lost	3-1	7–6
Interceptions	4	2
Penalties-Yards	11-77	6-50
