= Quentin Coryatt =

American football player (born 1970)

No. 55, 57
- Position: Linebacker

Personal information
- Born: August 1, 1970 (age 56); St. Croix, U.S. Virgin Islands
- Listed height: 6 ft 2 in (1.88 m)
- Listed weight: 250 lb (113 kg)

Career information
- High school: Robert E. Lee (Baytown, Texas)
- College: Texas A&M
- NFL draft: 1992: 1st round, 2nd overall pick

Career history
- Indianapolis Colts (1992–1998); Dallas Cowboys (1999)

Awards and highlights
- PFWA All-Rookie Team (1992); Second-team All-American (1991); SWC Defensive Player of the Year (1991); First-team All-SWC (1991); SWC Defensive Newcomer of the Year (1990)

Career NFL statistics
- Games played: 82
- Total tackles: 442
- Sacks: 8.5
- Interceptions: 3
- Stats at Pro Football Reference

Quentin John Coryatt (born August 1, 1970) is a former American football linebacker in the National Football League (NFL) for the Indianapolis Colts and Dallas Cowboys. He played college football at Texas A&M University. He is distinguished as being the first Crucian to play in the NFL.

== Early life ==
Coryatt was born in St. Croix, U.S. Virgin Islands, where he was raised until the age of 15. He attended Robert E. Lee High School in Baytown, Texas. As a senior, he received All-district, All-area and All-Greater Houston honors. He also practiced baseball and track.

== College career ==
He accepted a football scholarship from Texas A&M University. He didn't play in his first two years after failing to meet the requirements of Proposition 48.

As a junior, he became a starter at inside linebacker. He posted 92 tackles (five for loss), three sacks, 18 quarterback pressures and two fumble recoveries. He received SWC Newcomer of the Year honors, contributing to the defense ranking first in the nation. He was the centerpiece of an outstanding Aggie defensive unit (nicknamed "Wrecking Crew"), along with players like Mark Wheeler, Marcus Buckley, Kevin Smith, Derrick Frazier, and Patrick Bates.

As a senior, he registered 92 tackles (second on the team), 4.5 sacks, 11 tackles for loss, three passes defensed, one forced fumble and one fumble recovery. He gained fame in a nationally televised game by knocking out Texas Christian University wide receiver Kyle McPherson with a ferocious hit on a pass over the middle, breaking McPherson's jaw in three places. ESPN named it the "Hit of the Year". He was selected second-team All-American, All-SWC, and a SWC Defensive Player of the Year. In the 1992 Cotton Bowl Classic, the Aggies lost 10–2 against Florida State University, with Coryatt producing the only points after making a sack for a safety, while also having 15 tackles (10 solo), three tackles for loss and one safety.

In 2009, he was inducted into the Texas A&M Athletic Hall of Fame. In 2018, he was inducted into the Cotton Bowl Hall of Fame.

== Professional career ==
NFL statistics
Year	Team	Games	Combined tackles	Tackles	Assisted tackles	Sacks	Forced fumbles	Fumble recoveries	Fumble return yards	Interceptions	Interception return yards	Yards per interception return	Longest interception return	Interceptions returned for touchdown	Passes defended
1992	IND	7	0	0	0	2.0	0	1	0	0	0	0	0	0	0
1993	IND	16	140	103	37	1.0	1	0	0	0	0	0	0	0	7
1994	IND	16	141	59	34	1.0	0	1	0	0	0	0	0	0	4
1995	IND	16	163	86	77	2.5	1	3	0	1	6	6	6	0	8
1996	IND	8	40	32	8	0.0	0	2	0	0	0	0	0	0	0
1997	IND	15	77	56	21	2.0	2	0	0	2	3	2	3	0	3
1999	DAL	4	1	1	0	0.0	0	0	0	0	0	0	0	0	0
Career		82	459	339	120	8.5	4	7	0	3	9	3	6	0	22

=== Indianapolis Colts ===
Entering the 1992 NFL draft, the Indianapolis Colts owned the first two overall draft picks. After selecting defensive tackle Steve Emtman, the team chose Coryatt who was projected as the No. 1 linebacker. It was the highest draft position for a Texas A&M player since John David Crow in 1958.

As a rookie, he became the starter at left inside linebacker in the team's 3–4 defense for the first seven games. On October 27, he was placed on the injured reserve list with a broken left wrist he suffered in the seventh game against the Miami Dolphins. He recorded 54 tackles (at the time of the injury second on the team), two sacks and two forced fumbles.

In 1993, the team changed to a 4–3 defense and he was named the starter at middle linebacker. He tallied 150 tackles (led the team), 11 passes defensed, eight quarterback pressures, one sack and one forced fumble.

In 1994, Vince Tobin was hired as the new defensive coordinator and proceeded to move Coryatt to right outside linebacker, where he registered 141 tackles (third on the team), six passes defensed, one sack, two quarterback pressures and one fumble recovery. He set the franchise record for the longest fumble return (78 yards) against the Pittsburgh Steelers.

In 1995, he started at right outside linebacker, recording 163 tackles (second on the team), 2.5 sacks, six quarterback hurries, seven passes defensed, three fumble recoveries and his first career interception, while helping the team reach the AFC Championship Game.

In 1996, he was a restricted free agent and was signed to a $17.5 million offer sheet by the Jacksonville Jaguars, which the Colts ended up matching, ensuring he would remain with the team. He played just eight games in the season, after tearing 20 percent of his left pectoral muscle and later in the season tearing his right pectoral muscle off the bone, which was a career-threatening injury. He finished with 58 tackles, four quarterback pressures, two fumble recoveries and one forced fumble.

In 1997, he was limited with an injured left shoulder, starting 15 games (11 at the right side and 4 at the left side). He missed the game against the Tampa Bay Buccaneers with an Achilles injury. He posted 116 tackles (second on the team), two sacks, six quarterback pressures, two interceptions, one pass defensed and two forced fumbles. He was waived injured on August 31, 1998. He underwent reconstructive surgery on his left shoulder on September 30.

=== Dallas Cowboys ===
The Dallas Cowboys gambled that Coryatt could regain his form and signed him as a free agent on April 17, 1999. He was expected to be the starter at strongside linebacker, but was slowed down by an Achilles injury suffered during a June minicamp and also had problems with his surgically reconstructed left shoulder.

After not being able to overcome his injuries, he initially announced his retirement on September 14. He tried again to come back in December, playing in four games (one start), while making only one tackle. He was released on February 13, 2000.

Coryatt played in 82 games over a seven-year stretch in the NFL and although he was a solid contributor, injuries didn't allow him to live up to the stardom that was expected of him by virtue of his high draft status.
