= 1991 Baylor Bears football team =

American college football season

1991 Baylor Bears football

Copper Bowl, L 0–24 vs. Indiana
- Conference: Southwest Conference
- Record: 8–4 (5–3 SWC)
- Head coach: Grant Teaff (20th season)
- Offensive coordinator: Chuck Reedy (2nd season)
- Offensive scheme: I formation
- Defensive coordinator: Pete Fredenburg (9th season)
- Base defense: 4–4
- Home stadium: Floyd Casey Stadium

1991 Southwest Conference football standings
| | Conf. | | | | | Overall |
| Team | W | | L | | T | W | | L | | T |
|---|---|---|---|---|---|---|---|---|---|---|
| No. 12 Texas A&M $ | 8 | – | 0 | – | 0 | 10 | – | 2 | – | 0 |
| Baylor | 5 | – | 3 | – | 0 | 8 | – | 4 | – | 0 |
| Texas Tech | 5 | – | 3 | – | 0 | 6 | – | 5 | – | 0 |
| Arkansas | 5 | – | 3 | – | 0 | 6 | – | 6 | – | 0 |
| TCU | 4 | – | 4 | – | 0 | 7 | – | 4 | – | 0 |
| Texas | 4 | – | 4 | – | 0 | 5 | – | 6 | – | 0 |
| Houston | 3 | – | 5 | – | 0 | 4 | – | 7 | – | 0 |
| Rice | 2 | – | 6 | – | 0 | 4 | – | 7 | – | 0 |
| SMU | 0 | – | 8 | – | 0 | 1 | – | 10 | – | 0 |
$ – Conference champion; Rankings from AP Poll

The 1991 Baylor Bears football team represented Baylor University as a member of the Southwest Conference (SWC) during the 1991 NCAA Division I-A football season. Led by 20th-year head coach Grant Teaff, the Bears compiled an overall record of 8–4 with a mark of 5–3 in conference play, placing in a three-way tie for second in the SWC. Baylor was invited to the Copper Bowl, where the Bears lost to Indiana. The team played home games at Floyd Casey Stadium in Waco, Texas.

== Schedule ==
| Date | Time | Opponent | Rank | Site | TV | Result | Attendance | Source |
|---|---|---|---|---|---|---|---|---|
| September 7 | 7:00 p.m. | UTEP* | | Floyd Casey Stadium; Waco, TX | | W 27–7 | 35,127 | |
| September 14 | 1:00 p.m. | at No. 12 Colorado* | No. 23 | Folsom Field; Boulder, CO | | W 16–14 | 50,754 | |
| September 21 | 7:00 p.m. | Missouri* | No. 14 | Floyd Casey Stadium; Waco, TX | | W 47–21 | 41,721 | |
| September 28 | 12:00 p.m. | at SMU | No. 12 | Ownby Stadium; University Park, TX | Raycom | W 45–7 | 22,239 | |
| October 5 | 4:00 p.m. | at Houston | No. 11 | Houston Astrodome; Houston, TX (rivalry) | | W 38–21 | 37,022 | |
| October 12 | 12:00 p.m. | Rice | No. 8 | Floyd Casey Stadium; Waco, TX | Raycom | L 17–20 | 37,987 | |
| October 19 | 2:30 p.m. | No. 19 Texas A&M | No. 16 | Floyd Casey Stadium; Waco, TX (Battle of the Brazos) | ABC | L 12–34 | 50,267 | |
| October 26 | 12:00 p.m. | TCU^{†} | No. 22 | Floyd Casey Stadium; Waco, TX (rivalry) | Raycom | W 26–9 | 39,102 | |
| November 2 | 2:30 p.m. | at No. 24 Arkansas | No. 21 | Razorback Stadium; Fayetteville, AR | ABC | W 9–5 | 43,820 | |
| November 16 | 1:00 p.m. | Texas Tech | No. 20 | Floyd Casey Stadium; Waco, TX (rivalry) | | L 24–31 | 36,163 | |
| November 23 | 1:00 p.m. | at Texas | | Texas Memorial Stadium; Austin, TX (rivalry) | | W 21–11 | 61,310 | |
| December 31 | 7:00 p.m. | vs. Indiana* | | Arizona Stadium; Tucson, AZ (Copper Bowl) | WTBS | L 0–24 | 35,751 | |
*Non-conference game; ^{†}Homecoming; Rankings from AP Poll released prior to the game; All times are in Central time; Source:

== Roster ==
1991 Baylor Bears football team roster
Players
Coaches
Offense

| Pos. | # | Name | Class |
|---|---|---|---|
| WR | 83 | Melvin Bonner | Sr |

Defense

| Pos. | # | Name | Class |
|---|---|---|---|
| DT | 77 | Santana Dotson | Sr |
| DB | 37 | Frankie Smith | Sr |

Special teams

| Pos. | # | Name | Class |

Head coach

- Grant Teaff

Coordinators/assistant coaches

Legend

- (C) Team captain
- (S) Suspended
- (I) Ineligible
- Injured
- Redshirt

== After the season ==
=== NFL draft ===
The following Bears were selected in the 1992 NFL draft following the season.

| Round | Pick | Player | Position | NFL ream |
|---|---|---|---|---|
| 4 | 104 | Frankie Smith | Cornerback | Atlanta Falcons |
| 5 | 132 | Santana Dotson | Defensive end | Tampa Bay Buccaneers |
| 10 | 260 | Marcus Lowe | Defensive tackle | Cleveland Browns |
| 11 | 294 | Lee Miles | Wide receiver | Miami Dolphins |
| 11 | 297 | Robin Jones | Defensive end | Atlanta Falcons |
