= 1992 All-Western Athletic Conference football team =

American football team

The 1992 All-Western Athletic Conference football team consists of American football players chosen by various organizations for All-WAC teams for the 1992 college football season.

== Offensive selections ==
=== Quarterbacks ===
- Trent Dilfer, Fresno St. (Coaches-1)
- Ryan Hancock, BYU (Coaches-2)

=== Running backs ===
- Marshall Faulk, San Diego St. (Coaches-1)
- Travis Sims, Hawaii (Coaches-1)
- Dwight Driver, Wyoming (Coaches-2)
- Jamal Willis, BYU (Coaches-2)
- Lorenzo Neal, Fresno St. (Coaches-2)

=== Wide receivers ===
- Ryan Yarborough, Wyoming (Coaches-1)
- Greg Primus, Colorado St. (Coaches-1)
- Eric Drage, BYU (Coaches-1)
- Darney Scott, San Diego St. (Coaches-1)
- Darrick Branch, Hawaii (Coaches-2)
- Carl Winston, New Mexico (Coaches-2)
- Malcolm Seabron, Fresno St. (Coaches-2)

=== Tight ends ===
- Byron Rex, BYU (Coaches-1)
- Mike Jones, Wyoming (Coaches-2)

=== Offensive Linemen ===
- Jesse Hardwick, Fresno St. (Coaches-1)
- Scott Brumfield, BYU (Coaches-1)
- Tony Nichols, San Diego St. (Coaches-1)
- Doug Vailoleti, Hawaii (Coaches-1)
- Carlson Leomiti, San Diego St. (Coaches-2)
- Jim Remsey, Air Force (Coaches-2)
- Pat Meyer, Colorado St. (Coaches-2)
- Mike DeHoog, Utah (Coaches-2)

=== Centers ===
- Garry Pay, BYU (Coaches-1)
- Bob Cox, Colorado St. (Coaches-2)

== Defensive selections ==
=== Defensive Linemen ===
- Lenny Gomes, BYU (Coaches-1)
- Maa Tanuvasa, Hawaii (Coaches-1)
- Luther Elliss, Utah (Coaches-1)
- Zack Rix, Fresno St. (Coaches-1)
- Jamal Duff, San Diego St. (Coaches-2)
- Dave Chaytors, Utah (Coaches-2)
- Chris Baker, Air Force (Coaches-2)
- Randy Brock, BYU (Coaches-2)

=== Linebackers ===
- Barron Wortham, UTEP (Coaches-1)
- Vergil Simpson, Air Force (Coaches-1)
- Shad Hansen, BYU (Coaches-1)
- Jesse Becton, New Mexico (Coaches-1)
- Wendell Valentine, Fresno St. (Coaches-2)
- Brian Schneider, Colorado St. (Coaches-2)
- Robert Griffith, San Diego St. (Coaches-2)
- Todd Herget, BYU (Coaches-2)

=== Defensive Backs ===
- Carlton McDonald, Air Force (Coaches-1)
- Derwin Gray, BYU (Coaches-1)
- Damon Pieri, San Diego St. (Coaches-1)
- Greg Myers, Colorado St. (Coaches-1)
- Bryan Addison, Hawaii (Coaches-2)
- Eldrick Hill, Air Force (Coaches-2)
- Junior Marcellus, Wyoming (Coaches-2)
- Sam Watson, Fresno St. (Coaches-2)

== Special teams ==
=== Placekickers ===
- Jason Elam, Hawaii (Coaches-1)
- Marshall Young, UTEP (Coaches-2)

=== Punters ===
- Ed Bunn, UTEP (Coaches-1)
- Jason Elam, Hawaii (Coaches-2)

=== Return specialists ===
- Prentice Rhone, Wyoming (Coaches-1)
- Darrick Branch, Hawaii (Coaches-2)

== Other ==
=== Offensive Player of the Year ===
- Marshall Faulk, San Diego St. (Coaches)

=== Defensive Player of the Year ===
- Carlton McDonald, Air Force (Coaches)

=== Freshman of the Year ===
- Winslow Oliver, New Mexico (Coaches)

=== Special Teams Player of the Year ===
- Jason Elam, Hawaii (Coaches)

=== Coach of the Year ===
- Bob Wagner, Hawaii (Coaches)

== Key ==
Coaches = Western Athletic Conference head football coaches and sports information directors.

== See also ==
- 1992 College Football All-America Team
