= Travis Hill =

American football player (1969–2018)

No. 59, 93
- Position: Linebacker

Personal information
- Born: October 3, 1969; Texas City, Texas, U.S.
- Died: March 28, 2018 (aged 48); Houston, Texas, U.S.
- Listed height: 6 ft 2 in (1.88 m)
- Listed weight: 240 lb (109 kg)

Career information
- High school: Pearland (Pearland, Texas)
- College: Nebraska (1988–1992)
- NFL draft: 1993: 7th round, 180th overall pick

Career history
- Cleveland Browns (1993–1994); Carolina Panthers (1995); Cleveland Browns (1995)

Awards and highlights
- First-team All-American (1992); First-team All-Big Eight (1992); Second-team All-Big Eight (1991)

Career NFL statistics
- Tackles: 2
- Touchdowns: 1
- Stats at Pro Football Reference

Travis LaVell Hill (October 3, 1969 – March 28, 2018) was an American professional football player who played two seasons in the National Football League (NFL) with the Cleveland Browns and Carolina Panthers. Drafted in the seventh round by the Cleveland Browns in 1993, Hill did not see any playing time during the 1993 season, instead making his debut with the Browns in 1994. The following season, he played four games with the Browns before being traded to the expansion Panthers, where he would play the final three games of his career. During his brief career, Hill played in 21 games, recorded two tackles (one solo and one assist) and scored one touchdown, which came after a blocked punt. He died on March 28, 2018.

Pre-draft measurables
Height	Weight	Arm length	Hand span
6 ft 1 5/8 in (1.87 m)	231 lb (105 kg)	33 in (0.84 m)	8 7/8 in (0.23 m)
