= 1991 All-Southwest Conference football team =

American college football all-star team

The 1991 All-Southwest Conference football team consists of American football players chosen by various organizations for All-Southwest Conference teams for the 1991 NCAA Division I-A football season. The selectors for the 1991 season included the Southwest Conference coaches (the "Coaches" team).

== Offensive selections ==
=== Quarterbacks ===
- Bucky Richardson, Texas A&M (Coaches-1)
- David Klingler, Houston (Coaches-2)

=== Running backs ===
- Trevor Cobb, Rice (Coaches-1)
- Greg Hill, Texas A&M (Coaches-1)
- David Mims, Baylor (Coaches-2)
- Rongea Hill, SMU (Coaches-2)

=== Tight ends ===
- Kelly Blackwell, TCU (Coaches-1)
- Alonzo Pierce, Baylor (Coaches-2)

=== Wide receivers ===
- Marcus Grant, Houston (Coaches-1)
- Rodney Blackshear, Texas Tech (Coaches-1)
- Melvin Bonner, Baylor (Coaches-2)
- Fred Gilbert, Houston (Coaches-2)
- Tony Harrison, Texas A&M (Coaches-2)

=== Offensive Line ===
- Monte Jones, Baylor (Coaches-1)
- John Ellisor, Texas A&M (Coaches-1)
- Trey Teichelman, Rice (Coaches-1)
- Keith Alex, Texas A&M (Coaches-1)
- Jason Duvall, Texas Tech (Coaches-2)
- John Turnpaugh, Baylor (Coaches-2)
- Mike Gisler, Houston (Coaches-2)
- Dexter Wesley, Texas A&M (Coaches-2)

=== Centers ===
- Mark Henry, Arkansas (Coaches-1)
- Scott Baehren, Baylor (Coaches-2)

== Defensive selections ==
=== Defensive lineman ===
- Shane Dronett, Texas (Coaches-1)
- James Patton, Texas (Coaches-1)
- Santana Dotson, Baylor (Coaches-1)
- Roosevelt Collins, TCU (Coaches-1)
- Robin Jones, Baylor (Coaches-1)
- Sam Adams, Texas A&M (Coaches-2)
- Tommy Jeter, Texas (Coaches-2)
- Matt Sign, Rice (Coaches-2)
- Fred Petty, Texas Tech (Coaches-2)

=== Linebackers ===
- Quentin Coryatt, Texas A&M (Coaches-1)
- Marcus Buckley, Texas A&M (Coaches-1)
- Le'Shai Maston, Baylor (Coaches-1)
- Anthony Curl, Texas (Coaches-2)
- Jason Atkinson, Texas A&M (Coaches-2)
- Matt Wingo, Texas Tech (Coaches-2)

=== Defensive backs ===
- Kevin Smith, Texas A&M (Coaches-1)
- Tracy Saul, Texas Tech (Coaches-1)
- Michael James, Arkansas (Coaches-1)
- Patrick Bates, Texas A&M (Coaches-1)
- Lance Gunn, Texas (Coaches-2)
- Mark Berry, Texas (Coaches-2)
- Grady Cavness, Texas (Coaches-2)
- Derrick Frazier, Texas A&M (Coaches-2)

== Special teams ==
=== Placekickers ===
- Roman Anderson, Houston (Coaches-1)
- Lin Elliott, Texas Tech (Coaches-2)

=== Punters ===
- Mark Bounds, Texas Tech (Coaches-1)
- Charles Langston, Houston (Coaches-2)

== Miscellaneous ==
- Offensive MVP: Bucky Richardson, Texas A&M (Coaches)
- Defensive MVP: Quentin Coryatt, Texas A&M (Coaches)
- Coach of the Year: R. C. Slocum, Texas A&M (Coaches)
- Offensive Newcomer of the Year: Greg Hill, Texas A&M (Coaches)
- Defensive Newcomer of the Year: Sam Adams, Texas A&M (Coaches)

== Key ==
Coaches = selected by Southwest Conference coaches

== See also ==
1991 College Football All-America Team
