= 1991 TCU Horned Frogs football team =

American college football season

1991 TCU Horned Frogs football
- Conference: Southwest Conference
- Record: 7–4 (4–4 SWC)
- Head coach: Jim Wacker (9th season)
- Home stadium: Amon G. Carter Stadium

1991 Southwest Conference football standings
| | Conf. | | | | | Overall |
| Team | W | | L | | T | W | | L | | T |
|---|---|---|---|---|---|---|---|---|---|---|
| No. 12 Texas A&M $ | 8 | – | 0 | – | 0 | 10 | – | 2 | – | 0 |
| Baylor | 5 | – | 3 | – | 0 | 8 | – | 4 | – | 0 |
| Texas Tech | 5 | – | 3 | – | 0 | 6 | – | 5 | – | 0 |
| Arkansas | 5 | – | 3 | – | 0 | 6 | – | 6 | – | 0 |
| TCU | 4 | – | 4 | – | 0 | 7 | – | 4 | – | 0 |
| Texas | 4 | – | 4 | – | 0 | 5 | – | 6 | – | 0 |
| Houston | 3 | – | 5 | – | 0 | 4 | – | 7 | – | 0 |
| Rice | 2 | – | 6 | – | 0 | 4 | – | 7 | – | 0 |
| SMU | 0 | – | 8 | – | 0 | 1 | – | 10 | – | 0 |
$ – Conference champion; Rankings from AP Poll

The 1991 TCU Horned Frogs football team represented Texas Christian University (TCU) in the 1991 NCAA Division I-A football season. The Horned Frogs finished the season 7–4 overall and 4–4 in the Southwest Conference. The team was coached by Jim Wacker, in his ninth and final year as head coach. The Frogs played their home games in Amon G. Carter Stadium, which is located on campus in Fort Worth, Texas.

Following the 1990 NCAA Division I-A football season, TCU replaced the existing upper-deck seating area of Amon G. Carter stadium with aluminum bleacher seating. The new designed reduced the official seating capacity of the stadium from 46,083 to 44,008. Additionally, TCU replaced the field's artificial turf with natural grass.

== Schedule ==
| Date | Time | Opponent | Site | TV | Result | Attendance | Source |
|---|---|---|---|---|---|---|---|
| September 7 | | New Mexico* | Amon G. Carter Stadium; Fort Worth, TX | | W 60–7 | 21,112 | |
| September 14 | | Ball State* | Amon G. Carter Stadium; Fort Worth, TX | | W 22–16 | 25,421 | |
| September 21 | 6:30 p.m. | at Oklahoma State* | Lewis Field; Stillwater, OK | | W 24–21 | 37,206 | |
| September 28 | 7:00 p.m. | at Texas Tech | Jones Stadium; Lubbock, TX (rivalry) | | W 30–16 | 40,276 | |
| October 5 | 7:00 p.m. | Arkansas | Amon G. Carter Stadium; Fort Worth, TX | | L 21–22 | 36,146 | |
| October 19 | | at Rice | Rice Stadium; Houston, TX | | W 39–28 | 22,400 | |
| October 26 | 12:00 p.m. | at No. 22 Baylor | Floyd Casey Stadium; Waco, TX (rivalry) | Raycom | L 9–26 | 39,102 | |
| November 2 | 2:00 p.m. | SMU | Amon G. Carter Stadium; Fort Worth, TX (rivalry) | | W 18–10 | 24,021 | |
| November 9 | 7:00 p.m. | No. 12 Texas A&M | Amon G. Carter Stadium; Fort Worth, TX (rivalry) | ESPN | L 7–44 | 27,762 | |
| November 16 | 12:00 p.m. | at Texas | Texas Memorial Stadium; Austin, TX (rivalry) | Raycom | L 0–32 | 57,656 | |
| November 23 | | Houston | Amon G. Carter Stadium; Fort Worth, TX | | W 49–45 | 26,432 | |
*Non-conference game; Rankings from AP Poll released prior to the game; All times are in Central time; Source:

== Roster ==
1991 TCU Horned Frogs football team roster
| Players | | | Coaches |
|---|---|---|---|
| Offense: Pos. / # / Name / Class; TE / 89 / Kelly Blackwell / Sr | Defense: Pos. / # / Name / Class; DB / / Richard Woodley / So | Special teams: Pos. / # / Name / Class | Head coach: Jim Wacker; Coordinators/assistant coaches Legend: (C) Team captain; (S) Suspended; (I) Ineligible; Injured; Redshirt |
