= Deon Figures =

American football player (born 1970)

No. 21, 27
- Position: Cornerback

Personal information
- Born: January 10, 1970 (age 56); Bellflower, California, U.S.
- Listed height: 6 ft 0 in (1.83 m)
- Listed weight: 200 lb (91 kg)

Career information
- High school: Junípero Serra (Gardena, California)
- College: Colorado (1988–1992)
- NFL draft: 1993: 1st round, 23rd overall pick

Career history
- Pittsburgh Steelers (1993–1996); Jacksonville Jaguars (1997–1998)

Awards and highlights
- National champion (1990); Jim Thorpe Award (1992); Jack Tatum Trophy (1992); Consensus All-American (1992); Big Eight Defensive Player of the Year (1992); Big Eight Defensive Newcomer of the Year (1988); First-team All-Big Eight (1992); Second-team All-Big Eight (1991)

Career NFL statistics
- Tackles: 269
- Interceptions: 9
- Interception yards: 139
- Forced fumbles: 2
- Fumble recoveries: 4
- Sacks: 1
- Stats at Pro Football Reference
- College Football Hall of Fame

Deon Juniel Figures (born January 10, 1970) is an American former professional football player who was a cornerback in the National Football League (NFL) for six seasons. He played college football for the Colorado Buffaloes, and earned consensus All-American honors. He was selected by the Pittsburgh Steelers in the first round pick of the 1993 NFL draft. He also played for the Jacksonville Jaguars. In 2024, Figures was inducted into the College Football Hall of Fame.

== Early life ==
Figures was born in Bellflower, California. He grew up playing Pop Warner football in Gardena, under coach Chris Mahoney. He graduated from Junípero Serra High School, where he played for the Serra Cavaliers high school football team.

== College career ==
Figures attended the University of Colorado at Boulder, and played for the Colorado Buffaloes football team from 1988 to 1992. As a freshman in 1988, he played in 10 games and intercepted two passes against the Iowa State Cyclones, setting a record for Buffalo freshmen. He did not qualify academically in 1989, but played in all 12 games and compiled 67 unassisted tackles and 18 assists as a redshirt sophomore in 1990. In a non-conference game against the No. 12 Washington Huskies, Figures intercepted a second pass from Huskies quarterback Mark Brunell in the final minute of the game to secure the victory. After winning the Big Eight Conference championship with a 7–0 conference schedule and compiling a 10–1–1 overall record, the Buffaloes faced the No. 5 Notre Dame Fighting Irish in the Orange Bowl. Memorably, Figures intercepted a pass from Irish quarterback Rick Mirer as time expired to ice the Buffaloes' 10–9 victory and win the 1990 national championship.

By the start of his 1991 junior season, opposing Big Eight coaches were well aware of Figures' defensive skills and sought to direct offensive plays away from him. He managed to record two interceptions and 39 tackles and helped the Buffaloes win a share of their third straight Big Eight championship and another top-25 ranking. As a senior in 1992, he had six more interceptions while logging 38 tackles, and was recognized as a consensus first-team All-American. He was also the recipient of the Jim Thorpe Award and Jack Tatum Trophy as the best college defensive back in the country.

== Professional career ==
The Pittsburgh Steelers selected Figures in the first round, 23rd pick overall, of the 1993 NFL Draft. He played for the Steelers from 1993 to 1996. As a member of the Steelers, he helped his team reach the AFC Championship Game against the San Diego Chargers in 1994. He finished his NFL career with the Jacksonville Jaguars in 1997 and 1998. In his six seasons in the NFL, Figures played in 93 games, started 40 of them, and recorded 269 tackles, nine interceptions and four recovered fumbles.

=== NFL statistics ===
Year	Team	Games	Combined tackles	Tackles	Assisted tackles	Sacks	Forced fumbles	Fumble recoveries	Fumble return yards	Interceptions	Interception return yards	Yards per interception return	Longest interception return	Interceptions returned for touchdown	Passes defended
1993	PIT	15	29	27	2	0.0	1	2	0	1	78	78	78	0	15
1994	PIT	16	70	56	14	1.0	1	0	0	0	0	0	0	0	17
1995	PIT	14	11	10	1	0.0	0	0	0	0	0	0	0	0	4
1996	PIT	16	61	54	7	0.0	0	0	0	2	13	7	13	0	6
1997	JAX	16	58	56	2	0.0	0	0	0	5	48	10	32	0	10
1998	JAX	16	35	32	3	0.0	0	0	0	1	0	0	0	0	10
Career		93	264	235	29	1.0	2	2	0	9	139	15	78	0	62
