= 1991 Rice Owls football team =

American college football season

1991 Rice Owls football
- Conference: Southwest Conference
- Record: 4–7 (2–6 SWC)
- Head coach: Fred Goldsmith (3rd season)
- Offensive coordinator: Mike Heimerdinger (3rd season)
- Defensive coordinator: Craig Bohl (3rd season)
- Home stadium: Rice Stadium

1991 Southwest Conference football standings
	Conf.					Overall
Team	W		L		T	W		L		T
No. 12 Texas A&M $	8	–	0	–	0	10	–	2	–	0
Baylor	5	–	3	–	0	8	–	4	–	0
Texas Tech	5	–	3	–	0	6	–	5	–	0
Arkansas	5	–	3	–	0	6	–	6	–	0
TCU	4	–	4	–	0	7	–	4	–	0
Texas	4	–	4	–	0	5	–	6	–	0
Houston	3	–	5	–	0	4	–	7	–	0
Rice	2	–	6	–	0	4	–	7	–	0
SMU	0	–	8	–	0	1	–	10	–	0
$ – Conference champion; Rankings from AP Poll

The 1991 Rice Owls football team was an American football team that represented Rice University in the Southwest Conference during the 1991 NCAA Division I-A football season. In their third year under head coach Fred Goldsmith, the team compiled a 4–7 record.

== Schedule ==
Date	Opponent	Site	Result	Attendance	Source
September 14	at Northwestern*	Dyche Stadium; Evanston, IL	W 36–7	23,216	
September 21	at Tulane*	Louisiana Superdome; New Orleans, LA	W 28–19	18,475	
September 28	Iowa State*	Rice Stadium; Houston, TX	L 27–28	33,900	
October 5	at Texas	Texas Memorial Stadium; Austin, TX (rivalry)	L 7–28	67,328	
October 12	at No. 8 Baylor	Floyd Casey Stadium; Waco, TX	W 20–17	37,987	
October 19	TCU	Rice Stadium; Houston, TX	L 28–39	22,400	
October 26	at Texas Tech	Jones Stadium; Lubbock, TX	L 20–40	32,144	
November 2	No. 12 Texas A&M	Rice Stadium; Houston, TX	L 21–38	42,600	
November 9	at SMU	Ownby Stadium; University Park, TX (rivalry)	W 31–10	13,100	
November 16	Houston	Rice Stadium; Houston, TX (rivalry)	L 21–41	22,800	
November 23	at Arkansas	War Memorial Stadium; Little Rock, AR	L 0–20	40,436	
*Non-conference game; Rankings from AP Poll released prior to the game
