= 1992 All-Big Eight Conference football team =

Football team

The 1992 All-Big Eight Conference football team consists of American football players chosen by various organizations for All-Big Eight Conference teams for the 1992 NCAA Division I-A football season. The selectors for the 1992 season included the Associated Press (AP).

== Offensive selections ==
=== Quarterbacks ===
- Chip Hilleary, Kansas (AP-1)
- Kordell Stewart, Colorado (AP-2)

=== Running backs ===
- Calvin Jones, Nebraska (AP-1)
- Derek Brown, Nebraska (AP-1)
- Eric Gallon, Kansas State (AP-2)
- Maurice Douglas, Kansas (AP-2)

=== Tight ends ===
- Dwayne Chandler, Kansas (AP-1)
- Christian Fauria, Colorado (AP-2)

=== Wide receivers ===
- Victor Bailey, Missouri (AP-1)
- Michael Westbrook, Colorado (AP-1)
- Charles Johnson, Colorado (AP-2)
- Kenny Holly, Missouri (AP-2)

=== Centers ===
- Jim Scott, Nebraska (AP-1)
- Quentin Neujahr, Kansas State (AP-2)

=== Offensive linemen ===
- Will Shields, Nebraska (AP-1)
- Jim Hansen, Colorado (AP-1)
- Keith Loneker, Kansas (AP-1)
- Mike Bedosky, Missouri (AP-1)
- Zach Wiegert, Nebraska (AP-2)
- Jeff Resler, Oklahoma (AP-2)
- Lance Lundberg, Nebraska (AP-2)
- Doug Skartvedt, Iowa State (AP-2)

== Defensive selections ==
=== Defensive ends ===
- Travis Hill, Nebraska (AP-1)
- Chad Brown, Colorado (AP-1)
- Reggie Barnes, Oklahoma (AP-2)
- Jason Gildon, Oklahoma State (AP-2)

=== Defensive lineman ===
- Dana Stubblefield, Kansas (AP-1)
- John Parrella, Nebraska (AP-1)
- Leonard Renfro, Colorado (AP-1)
- Troy Peterson, Iowa State (AP-2)
- Rick Lyle, Missouri (AP-2)
- Chris Maumalanga, Kansas (AP-2)

=== Linebackers ===
- Keith Burns, Oklahoma State (AP-1)
- Greg Biekert, Colorado (AP-1)
- Ron Woolfork, Colorado (AP-1)
- Aubrey Beavers, Oklahoma (AP-2)
- Trev Alberts, Nebraska (AP-2)
- Malcolm Goodwin, Iowa State (AP-2)

=== Defensive backs ===
- Deon Figures, Colorado (AP-1)
- Jaime Mendez, Kansas State (AP-1)
- Tyrone Byrd, Nebraska (AP-1)
- Scott Harmon, Oklahoma State (AP-2)
- Mark DouBrava, Iowa State (AP-2)
- C. J. Masters, Kansas State (AP-2)

== Special teams ==
=== Place-kicker ===
- Dan Eichloff, Kansas (AP-1)
- Scott Blanton, Oklahoma (AP-2)

=== Punter ===
- Sean Snyder, Kansas State (AP-1)
- Mike Stigge, Nebraska (AP-2)

== Coach of the Year ==
- Pat Jones, Oklahoma State (AP-1)

== Key ==
AP = Associated Press

== See also ==
- 1992 College Football All-America Team
