= 1991 Arkansas Razorbacks football team =

American college football season

1991 Arkansas Razorbacks football

Independence Bowl, L 15–24 vs. Georgia
- Conference: Southwest Conference
- Record: 6–6 (5–3 SWC)
- Head coach: Jack Crowe (2nd season)
- Defensive coordinator: Joe Kines (1st season)
- Captains: Kirk Collins; Mark Henry
- Home stadium: Razorback Stadium; War Memorial Stadium

1991 Southwest Conference football standings
	Conf.					Overall
Team	W		L		T	W		L		T
No. 12 Texas A&M $	8	–	0	–	0	10	–	2	–	0
Baylor	5	–	3	–	0	8	–	4	–	0
Texas Tech	5	–	3	–	0	6	–	5	–	0
Arkansas	5	–	3	–	0	6	–	6	–	0
TCU	4	–	4	–	0	7	–	4	–	0
Texas	4	–	4	–	0	5	–	6	–	0
Houston	3	–	5	–	0	4	–	7	–	0
Rice	2	–	6	–	0	4	–	7	–	0
SMU	0	–	8	–	0	1	–	10	–	0
$ – Conference champion; Rankings from AP Poll

The 1991 Arkansas Razorbacks football team represented the University of Arkansas as a member of the Southwest Conference (SWC) during the 1991 NCAA Division I-A football season. Led by second-year head coach Jack Crowe, the Razorbacks compiled an overall record of 6–6 with a mark of 5–3 in conference play, placing in a three-way tie for second in the SWC. Arkansas was invited to the Independence Bowl, where the Razorbacks lost to Georgia. The team played home games at Razorback Stadium in Fayetteville, Arkansas and War Memorial Stadium in Little Rock, Arkansas.

Punter Pete Raether finished third in the nation in punting average, with 43.6 yards per boot. Punt returner Michael James averaged 14.3 yards per return, seventh in the nation. A knee injury to starting quarterback Jason Allen in the second half of the Baylor hampered Arkansas' ability to move the football on offense. The Razorbacks lost four of their final five games. However, the Hogs enjoyed a 14-13 victory over Texas in Little Rock in the final meeting of the rivals as SWC opponents.

This season ended Arkansas' tenure in the SWC, of which the school had been a member since 1915. The SWC's reputation had been badly tarnished over the previous decade as the conference had seen every football team except Arkansas, Baylor, and Rice, hit with sanctions or recruiting scandals in the 1980s, including SMU's "death penalty" in 1987. Arkansas joined the Southeastern Conference (SEC) in 1992 along with the University of South Carolina. The SWC was dissolved after the 1995–96 school year.

== Schedule ==
Date	Time	Opponent	Rank	Site	TV	Result	Attendance	Source
August 31	11:30 a.m.	No. 3 Miami (FL)*		War Memorial Stadium; Little Rock, AR	ABC	L 3–31	46,308	
September 7	7:00 p.m.	SMU		War Memorial Stadium; Little Rock, AR		W 17–6	49,216	
September 21	5:00 p.m.	Southwestern Louisiana*		Razorback Stadium; Fayetteville, AR		W 9–7	41,740	
September 28	6:00 p.m.	at Ole Miss*		Mississippi Veterans Memorial Stadium; Jackson, MS (rivalry)		L 17–24	56,500	
October 5	7:00 p.m.	at TCU		Amon G. Carter Stadium; Fort Worth, TX		W 22–21	36,146	
October 12	2:00 p.m.	Houston		Razorback Stadium; Fayetteville, AR		W 29–17	45,860	
October 19	12:00 p.m.	Texas		War Memorial Stadium; Little Rock, AR (rivalry)	Raycom	W 14–13	55,618	
November 2	2:30 p.m.	No. 21 Baylor	No. 24	Razorback Stadium; Fayetteville, AR	ABC	L 5–9	43,820	
November 9	12:00 p.m.	at Texas Tech		Jones Stadium; Lubbock, TX (rivalry)	Raycom	L 21–38	31,895	
November 16	6:30 p.m.	at No. 13 Texas A&M		Kyle Field; College Station, TX (rivalry)	ESPN	L 3–13	62,487	
November 23	1:00 p.m.	Rice		War Memorial Stadium; Little Rock, AR		W 20–0	40,436	
December 29	1:30 p.m.	vs. No. 24 Georgia*		Independence Stadium; Shreveport, LA (Independence Bowl)	ABC	L 15–24	46,932	
*Non-conference game; Rankings from AP Poll released prior to the game; All times are in Central time; Source:
