= 1991 Texas Longhorns football team =

American college football season

1991 Texas Longhorns football
- Conference: Southwest Conference
- Record: 5–6 (4–4 SWC)
- Head coach: David McWilliams (5th season)
- Offensive coordinator: Lynn Amedee (3rd season)
- Defensive coordinator: Leon Fuller (8th season)
- Home stadium: Texas Memorial Stadium

1991 Southwest Conference football standings
	Conf.					Overall
Team	W		L		T	W		L		T
No. 12 Texas A&M $	8	–	0	–	0	10	–	2	–	0
Baylor	5	–	3	–	0	8	–	4	–	0
Texas Tech	5	–	3	–	0	6	–	5	–	0
Arkansas	5	–	3	–	0	6	–	6	–	0
TCU	4	–	4	–	0	7	–	4	–	0
Texas	4	–	4	–	0	5	–	6	–	0
Houston	3	–	5	–	0	4	–	7	–	0
Rice	2	–	6	–	0	4	–	7	–	0
SMU	0	–	8	–	0	1	–	10	–	0
$ – Conference champion; Rankings from AP Poll

The 1991 Texas Longhorns football team represented the University of Texas at Austin as a member of the Southwest Conference (SWC) during the 1991 NCAA Division I-A football season. Led by David McWilliams in his fifth and final season as head coach, the Longhorns compiled an overall record of 5–6 with a mark of 4–4 in conference play, tying for fifth place in the SWC. The team played home games at Texas Memorial Stadium in Austin, Texas.

== Schedule ==
Date	Time	Opponent	Rank	Site	TV	Result	Attendance	Source
September 7	11:30 a.m.	at Mississippi State*	No. 13	Scott Field; Starkville, MS	WTBS	L 6–13	34,123	
September 21	6:30 p.m.	No. 13 Auburn*		Texas Memorial Stadium; Austin, TX	ESPN	L 10–14	77,809	
October 5	1:00 p.m.	Rice		Texas Memorial Stadium; Austin, TX (rivalry)		W 28–7	67,328	
October 12	2:30 p.m.	vs. No. 6 Oklahoma*		Cotton Bowl; Dallas, TX (Red River Shootout)	ABC	W 10–7	75,587	
October 19	12:00 p.m.	at Arkansas		War Memorial Stadium; Little Rock, AR (rivalry)	Raycom	L 13–14	55,618	
October 26	2:00 p.m.	at SMU		Cotton Bowl; Dallas, TX		W 34–0	26,000	
November 2	12:00 p.m.	Texas Tech		Texas Memorial Stadium; Austin, TX (rivalry)	Raycom	W 23–15	74,873	
November 9	2:30 p.m.	at Houston		Houston Astrodome; Houston, TX	ABC	L 14–23	47,911	
November 16	12:00 p.m.	TCU		Texas Memorial Stadium; Austin, TX (rivalry)	Raycom	W 32–0	57,656	
November 23	1:00 p.m.	Baylor		Texas Memorial Stadium; Austin, TX (rivalry)		L 11–21	61,310	
November 28	6:30 p.m.	at No. 10 Texas A&M		Kyle Field; College Station, TX (rivalry)	ESPN	L 14–31	76,532	
*Non-conference game; Rankings from AP Poll released prior to the game; All times are in Central time; Source:

== Season summary ==
=== vs Oklahoma ===
#6 Oklahoma Sooners (4–0) vs. Texas Longhorns (1–2)

Quarter	1	2	3	4	Total
Oklahoma	7	0	0	0	7
Texas	0	3	0	7	10

at Cotton Bowl Stadium, Dallas, Texas

- Game weather: Clear, 93 °F (34 °C), wind 15–20 NW
- Game attendance: 75,587
- Referee: John Laurie
- TV: ABC
- Box Score

Game information

First quarter

- OU – Ted Long 24-yard pass from Cale Gundy (Scott Blanton kick), 4:56. Oklahoma 7–0. Drive: 4 plays, 40 yards, 1:45.

Second quarter

- UT – Jason Post 30-yard field goal, 7:10. Oklahoma 7–3. Drive: 12 plays, 67 yards, 3:36.

Third quarter

- No scoring

Fourth quarter

- UT – Bubba Jacques 30-yard fumble return (Jason Post kick), 13:30. Texas 10–7.

Top passers

- OU – Cale Gundy – 5/17, 69 yards, TD
- UT – Peter Gardere – 11/24, 110 yards, INT

Top rushers

- OU –
- UT – Adrian Walker – 10 rushes, 56 yards

Top receivers

- OU
- UT – Darrick Duke – 4 Receptions, 57 yards

External videos
- 1991 Oklahoma vs. Texas - full game broadcast

== Personnel ==
1991 Texas Longhorns football team roster
Players
Coaches
Offense

Pos.	#	Name	Class
OL		Jeff Boyd
RB		Phil Brown
OL		Jason Burleson
RB		Shane Childers
RB		Gerald Crawford
WR		Mike Davis
WR		Darrick Duke
QB		Peter Gardere	RJr
OL		Scott Gooch
RB		Butch Hadnot
WR		Brian Howard
TE		Clay Howell
OL		Chuck Johnson	Sr
TE		Darriel Johnson
QB		Chad Lucas
OL		Alan
OL		Turk McDonald
WR		Justin McLemore
WR		Kenny Neal
WR		Cosmo Palmieri
QB		Jimmy Saxton
OL		Shay Shafie
TE		Curtis Thrift
RB		Adrian Walker
RB		Rodrick Walker
RB		Patrick Wilson

Defense

Pos.	#	Name	Class
DB		Mark Berry
DB		Grady Cayness
LB		Anthony Curl
DL		Shane Dronett
DB		Willie Mack Garza
DB		Lance Gunn
FS		Bubba Jacques	Sr
DL		Tommy Jeter
DB		Van Malone
LB		Mical Padgett
DT		Jason Patton
LB		Boone Powell
LB		Chris Rapp
DL		Bo Robinson

Special teams

Pos.	#	Name	Class
K		Craig Dickey
P		Kelly McClanahan
K		Jason Post
K		Jason Ziegler

Head coach

- David McWilliams

Coordinators/assistant coaches

- Leon Fuller (DC)

Legend

- (C) Team captain
- (S) Suspended
- (I) Ineligible
- Injured
- Redshirt
