= Orangefield, Texas =

Unincorporated community in Texas, US

Coordinates: 30°04′29″N 93°51′20″W

Orangefield is an unincorporated community located in the Beaumont-Port Arthur metropolitan area, approximately twelve miles east of Beaumont in Orange County, Texas, United States. In 1913, the town began to develop around the oilfield just west of Orange, and its name was derived from being called the "Orange Oil Field", which was later shorted to "Orangefield". After a major producing well was discovered in August 1913, a post office was established for Orangefield in 1922.

== History ==
It was a small community of farmers before the discovery of oil. A few rice farms and marshes comprised the population in the area between Orange, Bridge City, and Vidor. The rice crop planted in the area was linked to W.R. Hill, possibly as early as 1888. Immigrant farmers made up much of the population in the area that was divided into three different communities. The communities fell under the names Oilla, Terry, and Duncan's Woods. It is unclear when the name Orangefield actually formed, but it was sometime after the first oil well struck.

Many farmers allowed oil wells to be dug on their properties, especially since they still owned the mineral rights. The Bland oil well was the first to strike oil in 1913. It received the name "Old Faithful," because it was said to "head like Old Faithful every 50 minutes." Wildcatters from all over raced to the area after the news of the Bland well. The discovery of oil in Orange County raised a lot of hopes. These hopes began to dwindle during the ten years until the true boom commenced.

Much of the town's business district was destroyed in a fire that burned down 13 buildings in the business district after starting in a tailor shop. Reportedly, a steam press for clothes caught fire and "an employee picked up a bucket of gasoline, believing it to be water" and threw it on the blaze.

By 1927, the boom seemed to be over.

A second boom in 1937 revived the little town and breathed new life into the dying community. A. H. Montagne and Paul Cormier brought in the new boom when they hit a major oil pocket. Montagne was quoted as saying about Cormier, "The man just found a deeper well. He gambled and hit." The population once again shot through the roof during this second boom. The Depression was eased on a lot of people living in Orangefield because of this second boom. Work was readily available in the oilfields for those who were willing. There were not many who would not be willing to work in the oilfields during that time. Farmers whose crops failed would change profession to save their families and farms. The boom only lasted a few years, until World War II would cause it to come to a premature end.

The population reached an estimated 1000 people by the mid-1930s, but decreased to about 500 by the early 1950s. In 1990, the estimated population was 725.

The Orangefield Independent School District serves area students.

The community is in the Central Standard time zone. Elevation is 10 feet.

== Notable people ==
- Jeff Granger - Former Texas A&M quarterback and pitcher (All SWC and All American) (1991-1993); former MLB pitcher for Kansas City Royals and Pittsburgh Pirates (fifth overall pick in 1993 MLB Draft)
- Bradley Dale Peveto - Assistant football coach at University of Texas at El Paso.
- Michael Berry - three-term Houston city councilman and now a conservative talk show host on KTRH radio and KPRC radio, both based in Houston.
