= 1992 All-America college football team =

Official list of the best college football players of 1992

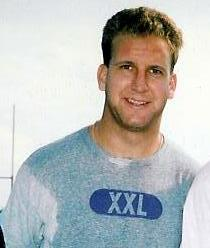
1992 Heisman Trophy winner Gino Torretta

The 1992 All-America college football team is composed of college football players who were selected as All-Americans by various organizations and publications that chose College Football All-America Teams in 1992. It is an honor given annually to the best American college football players at their respective positions.

The National Collegiate Athletic Association (NCAA) recognizes five selectors as "official" for the 1992 season. They are: (1) the American Football Coaches Association (AFCA); (2) the Associated Press (AP); (3) the Football Writers Association of America (FWAA); (4) the United Press International (UPI); and (5) the Walter Camp Football Foundation (WCFF). Other notable selectors included Football News, Gannett News Service (GNS), Scripps Howard (SH), The Sporting News (TSN), and The World Almanac (WA) in conjunction with the Newspaper Enterprise Association.

Nine players were selected unanimously by all five official selectors. They are: quarterback Gino Torretta of Miami (FL), running backs Marshall Faulk of San Diego State and Garrison Hearst of Georgia, tight end Chris Gedney of Syracuse, tackle Lincoln Kennedy of Washington, guard Will Shields of Nebraska, linebackers Marcus Buckley of Texas A&M and Marvin Jones of Florida State, and defensive back Carlton McDonald of Air Force. Gino Torretta also won the 1992 Heisman Trophy.

== Offense ==
=== Quarterback ===
- Gino Torretta, Miami (CFHOF) (AFCA, AP-1, FWAA, UPI, WCFF, FN, GNS, SH, TSN-1)
- Drew Bledsoe, Washington State (WA)
- Charlie Ward, Florida State (CFHOF) (AP-3, TSN-2)
- Marvin Graves, Syracuse (AP-2)

=== Running backs ===
- Marshall Faulk, San Diego State (CFHOF) (AFCA, AP-1, FWAA, UPI, WCFF, FN, GNS, SH, TSN-1, WA)
- Garrison Hearst, Georgia (AFCA, AP-1, FWAA, UPI, WCFF, FN, GNS, SH, TSN-1, WA)
- Reggie Brooks, Notre Dame (AP-2, TSN-2)
- Greg Hill, Texas A&M (AP-3, TSN-2)
- Trevor Cobb, Rice (AP-2)
- Chuckie Dukes, Boston College (AP-3)

=== Wide receivers ===
- O.J. McDuffie, Penn St. (AFCA, AP-1, UPI, WCFF, FN, GNS, SH, TSN-2)
- Sean Dawkins, California (AP-1, FWAA, WCFF, GNS, SH, TSN-1, WA)
- Lloyd Hill, Texas Tech (AFCA, AP-2, UPI, FN, TSN-1)
- Michael Westbrook, Colorado (AP-2, WA)
- Ryan Yarborough, Wyoming (FWAA)
- Lamar Thomas, Miami (FL) (AP-3, TSN-2)
- Derrick Alexander, Michigan (AP-3)

=== Tight end ===
- Chris Gedney, Syracuse (AFCA, AP-1, FWAA, UPI, WCFF, FN, SH, TSN-1, WA)
- Irv Smith, Notre Dame (GNS)
- Coleman Bell, Miami (FL) (AP-2)
- Clarence Williams, Washington State (TSN-2)
- Troy Drayton, Penn State (AP-3)

=== Tackles ===
- Lincoln Kennedy, Washington (AFCA, AP-1, FWAA, UPI, WCFF, GNS, SH, TSN-1, WA)
- Willie Roaf, Louisiana Tech (CFHOF) (AP-2, FWAA, UPI, GNS, TSN-2, WA)
- Tony Boselli, USC (CFHOF) (AP-2, WCFF, SH)
- Tom Scott, East Carolina (FN, TSN-1)
- Alec Millen, Georgia (AP-3)

=== Guards ===
- Will Shields, Nebraska (CFHOF) (AFCA, AP-1, FWAA, UPI, WCFF, FN, SH, TSN-1, WA)
- Aaron Taylor, Notre Dame (AP-1, UPI, WCFF, FN, SH, TSN-1)
- Everett Lindsay, Mississippi (AP-1 [tackle], FWAA, TSN-2 [tackle], WA)
- Ben Coleman, Wake Forest (AFCA, AP-3 [tackle], GNS)
- Lester Holmes, Jackson State (GNS)
- Stacy Seegars, Clemson (AP-2)
- Joe Cocozzo, Michigan (AP-2, TSN-2)
- Mike Govi, Tulsa (TSN-2)
- Mike Gee, NC State (AP-3)
- Fletcher Kelster, Oregon State (AP-3)

=== Center ===
- Mike Compton, West Virginia (AFCA, AP-1, UPI, WCFF, FN, SH, TSN-1, WA)
- Mike Devlin, Iowa (AFCA, FWAA)
- Steve Everitt, Michigan (AP-2, GNS, TSN-2)
- Ed Bowen, Temple (AP-3)

== Defense ==
=== Linemen ===
- Eric Curry, Alabama (AFCA, AP-1, UPI, WCFF, GNS, SH, TSN-1, WA)
- Chris Slade, Virginia (AP-1, FWAA, UPI, WCFF, FN, TSN-1)
- John Copeland, Alabama (AFCA, AP-1, FWAA, WCFF, FN, GNS, SH, TSN-1)
- Rob Waldrop, Arizona (CFHOF) (AP-1, FWAA, UPI, TSN-2, WA)
- Chris Hutchinson, Michigan (AFCA, AP-2, FWAA, FN, SH, TSN-2)
- Coleman Rudolph, Georgia Tech (AP-2, WCFF, SH, TSN-1)
- Shante Carver, Arizona State (AP-3, WA)
- Travis Hill, Nebraska (AFCA)
- John Parrella, Nebraska (GNS)
- Leonard Renfro, Colorado (GNS)
- Dana Stubblefield, Kansas (AP-2)
- Albert Fontenot, Baylor (AP-2)
- Kevin Mitchell, Syracuse (TSN-2)
- Lou Benfatti, Penn State (TSN-2)
- Todd Kelly, Tennessee (AP-3)
- Jeff Zgonina, Purdue (AP-3)
- Ricky Logo, NC State (AP-3)

=== Linebackers ===
- Marvin Jones, Florida State (AFCA, AP-1, FWAA, UPI, WCFF, FN, GNS, SH, TSN-1, WA)
- Marcus Buckley, Texas A&M (AFCA, AP-1, FWAA, UPI, WCFF, FN, SH, TSN-1)
- Micheal Barrow, Miami (Fla.) (AP-1, FWAA, UPI, WCFF, FN, SH, TSN-1, WA)
- Ron George, Stanford (AP-3, FN, TSN-2, WA)
- Dave Hoffmann, Washington (AFCA, AP-2, GNS, TSN-2, WA)
- Steve Tovar, Ohio St. (AFCA)
- Darrin Smith, Miami (Fla.) (AP-2, UPI)
- Curt McMillan, Miami (OH) (AP-3, GNS)
- Travis Hill, Nebraska (AP-2, TSN-2)
- Brett Wallerstedt, Arizona State (AP-3)

=== Defensive backs ===
- Carlton McDonald, Air Force (AFCA, AP-1, FWAA, UPI, WCFF, SH, TSN-1, WA)
- Deon Figures, Colorado (AP-1, FWAA, UPI, WCFF, FN, GNS, SH, TSN-1, WA)
- Carlton Gray, UCLA (AFCA, AP-1, UPI, WCFF, FN, SH, TSN-1, WA)
- Ryan McNeil, Miami (Fla.) (AFCA, AP-1, WCFF, FN, GNS, SH, TSN-2)
- Patrick Bates, Texas A&M (AP-2, FWAA, UPI, TSN-1, WA)
- Lance Gunn, Texas (FWAA, FN, TSN-2)
- Othello Henderson, UCLA (GNS)
- Stephon Pace, Southern California (GNS)
- George Teague, Alabama (AP-2)
- Corey Sawyer, Florida State (AP-2)
- Mike Reid, NC State (AP-2, TSN-2)
- Aaron Glenn, Texas A&M (TSN-2)
- Tom Carter, Notre Dame (AP-3)
- George Coghill, Wake Forest (AP-3)
- John Lynch, Stanford (AP-3)
- Antonio Langham, Alabama (AP-3)

== Specialists ==
=== Placekicker ===
- Joe Allison, Memphis State (AP-1, FWAA, UPI, FN, TSN-1)
- Jason Elam, Hawaii (AFCA, AP-3 [punter], SH, WA)
- Scott Sisson, Georgia Tech (AP-2, WCFF, GNS, TSN-2)
- Nelson Welch, Clemson (AP-3)

=== Punter ===
- Sean Snyder, Kansas St. (AFCA, AP-1)
- Ed Bunn, UTEP (AP-2, WCFF, FN, SH, TSN-2, WA)
- Josh Miller, Arizona (FWAA, TSN-1)
- Mitch Berger, Colorado (UPI)
- Harold Alexander, Appalachian State (GNS)

=== All-purpose / kick returners ===
- Curtis Conway, USC (AP-3, FWAA, GNS, TSN-2)
- Glyn Milburn, Stanford (AP-1 [all-purpose])
- Tamarick Vanover, Florida State (TSN-1)
- Ryan Benjamin, Pacific (AP-2)

== Key ==
- **Bold** – Used for (1) consensus All-American and (2) first-team selections by an official selector
- CFHOF - Inducted into the College Football Hall of Fame
- -1 – First-team selection
- -2 – Second-team selection
- -3 – Third-team selection

=== Official selectors ===
- AFCA = American Football Coaches Association for Kodak
- AP = Associated Press
- FWAA = Football Writers Association of America
- UPI = United Press International
- WCFF = Walter Camp Football Foundation as chosen by coaches and sports information directors at 107 NCAA Division IA schools

=== Other selectors ===
- FN = Football News
- GNS = Gannett News Service
- SH = Scripps Howard News Service
- TSN = The Sporting News
- WA = The World Almanac team announced by the Newspaper Enterprise Association and syndicated in more than 600 newspapers; selected by "a panel of sports experts" for The World Almanac, its co-sponsoring newspapers; and its publisher Pharos Books

== See also ==
- 1992 All-Atlantic Coast Conference football team
- 1992 All-Big Eight Conference football team
- 1992 All-Big Ten Conference football team
- 1992 All-Pacific-10 Conference football team
- 1992 All-SEC football team
- 1992 All-Western Athletic Conference football team
