= Greg Schorp =

American football player (born 1971)

Profile
- Position: Tight end

Personal information
- Born: September 6, 1971 (age 55); Biloxi, Mississippi, U.S.
- Listed height: 6 ft 3 in (1.91 m)
- Listed weight: 24 lb (11 kg)

Career information
- High school: Winston Churchill (San Antonio, Texas)
- College: Texas A&M
- NFL draft: 1994: undrafted

Career history
- Dallas Cowboys (1994)*; Seattle Seahawks (1994)*; Jacksonville Jaguars (1995)*; Dallas Cowboys (1995)*
- * Offseason or practice squad member only

Awards and highlights
- Super Bowl champion (XXX); First-team All-SWC (1992)

Greg Schorp (born September 6, 1971) is an American former professional football player who was a tight end for the Dallas Cowboys of the National Football League (NFL). He played college football for the Texas A&M Aggies, receiving All-SWC honors from 1991 to 1993 and was a first-team selection the latter two years. As a senior, he received honorable-mention All-American recognition.

== Early life ==
Schorp was a standout at San Antonio Churchill High School. He was a two-time All-district tight end and linebacker. He also competed in basketball and baseball.

He accepted a football scholarship from Texas A&M University. He was a part of a strong squad that beat 13th ranked BYU 65–14 in the Holiday Bowl. As a sophomore in 1991, he caught seven passes for 114 yards as the Aggies won the first of three straight SWC titles during his Aggie tenure.

As a junior in 1992, Schorp had 26 receptions for 294 yards and one touchdown, becoming the first tight end to lead the Aggies in receptions since Rod Bernstine in 1986, almost helping the Aggies complete a perfect year, as they remained undefeated until the last game of the season, losing to #5 Notre Dame in the Cotton Bowl Classic. In the season opener, Schorp's 21-yard touchdown catch in the fourth quarter pulled A&M even with Stanford - the only TD the Aggies would score that day as they went on to win a 10–7 nailbiter. Schorp caught four passes for 68 yards against the Cardinal and was named the Most Valuable Player of the Disneyland Pigskin Classic. The catch that he is most remembered for by Aggie fans came three games later at Kyle Field in College Station. With the #5 Aggies trailing Texas Tech 17–16 with time running out in the fourth quarter on a third-and-long play, quarterback Jeff Granger broke away from Tech's Dusty Beavers to avoid a sack deep behind the line of scrimmage. Granger, who had been inconsistent all day, somehow managed to duck under the tackle and scrambled to find Schorp, who made a diving 13-yard catch for a first down. That catch saved the game for the Aggies and set up a Terry Venetoulias field goal as time expired, giving the Aggies a 19–17 win against their hated rival. It was the second of nine consecutive wins that season for the Aggies, who finished the season with a tough 24–21 loss to #4 Notre Dame in the Cotton Bowl Classic.

As a senior in 1993, he started all 11 games, registering 17 receptions for 220 yards. He is, to date, the last tight end to earn first-team all-conference honors for the Aggies.

== Professional career ==
Schorp was signed as an undrafted free agent by the Dallas Cowboys after the 1994 NFL draft on April 29. He was waived on August 17. He had two stints with the team and was given a Super Bowl XXX championship ring in 1995, as a member of the team's practice squad.

On January 12, 1995, he signed with the Jacksonville Jaguars. He was released on August 28.
