= 1991 Houston Cougars football team =

American college football season

1991 Houston Cougars football
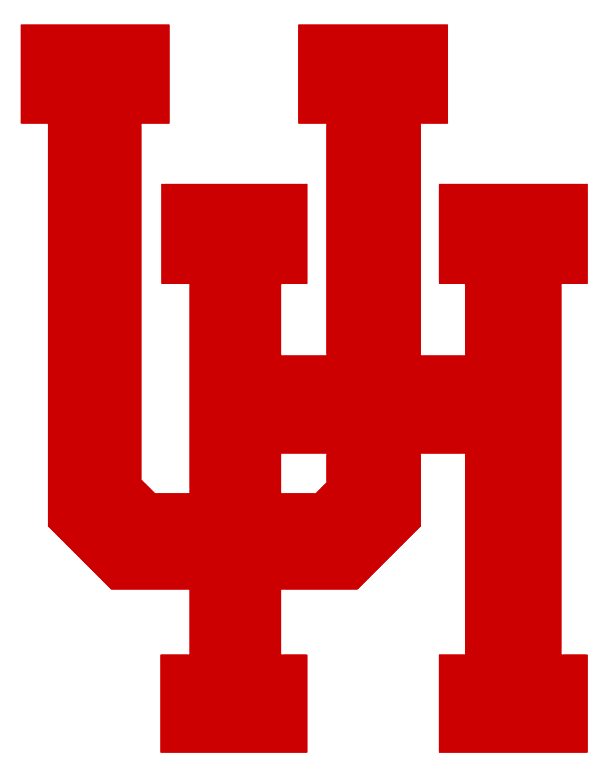
- Conference: Southwest Conference
- Record: 4–7 (3–5 SWC)
- Head coach: John Jenkins (2nd season)
- Offensive scheme: Run and shoot
- Defensive coordinator: Ben Hurt (1st season)
- Base defense: 4–3
- Captains: Roman Anderson; David Klingler; Glenn Cadrez
- Home stadium: Houston Astrodome

1991 Southwest Conference football standings
	Conf.					Overall
Team	W		L		T	W		L		T
No. 12 Texas A&M $	8	–	0	–	0	10	–	2	–	0
Baylor	5	–	3	–	0	8	–	4	–	0
Texas Tech	5	–	3	–	0	6	–	5	–	0
Arkansas	5	–	3	–	0	6	–	6	–	0
TCU	4	–	4	–	0	7	–	4	–	0
Texas	4	–	4	–	0	5	–	6	–	0
Houston	3	–	5	–	0	4	–	7	–	0
Rice	2	–	6	–	0	4	–	7	–	0
SMU	0	–	8	–	0	1	–	10	–	0
$ – Conference champion; Rankings from AP Poll

The 1991 Houston Cougars football team represented the University of Houston as a member of the Southwest Conference (SWC) during the 1991 NCAA Division I-A football season. Led by second-year head coach John Jenkins, the Cougars compiled an overall record of 4–7 and a mark of 3–5 in conference play, placing seventh in the SWC. The team played home games at the Houston Astrodome in Houston.

== Schedule ==
Date	Opponent	Rank	Site	TV	Result	Attendance	Source
August 31	Louisiana Tech*	No. 12	Houston Astrodome; Houston, TX		W 73–3	30,082	
September 12	at No. 2 Miami (FL)*	No. 10	Miami Orange Bowl; Miami, FL	ESPN	L 10–40	71,842	
September 21	at Illinois*	No. 21	Memorial Stadium; Champaign, IL	ABC	L 10–51	60,182	
October 5	No. 11 Baylor		Houston Astrodome; Houston, TX (rivalry)		L 21–38	37,022	
October 12	at Arkansas		Razorback Stadium; Fayetteville, AR		L 17–29	45,860	
October 19	SMU^{†}		Houston Astrodome; Houston, TX (rivalry)		W 49–20	17,339	
October 26	at No. 13 Texas A&M		Kyle Field; College Station, TX		L 18–27	65,812	
November 9	Texas		Houston Astrodome; Houston, TX	ABC	W 23–14	47,911	
November 16	at Rice		Rice Stadium; Houston, TX (rivalry)		W 41–21	22,800	
November 23	at TCU		Amon G. Carter Stadium; Fort Worth, TX		L 45–49	26,432	
November 30	Texas Tech		Houston Astrodome; Houston, TX (rivalry)	Raycom	L 46–52	18,114	
*Non-conference game; ^{†}Homecoming; Rankings from AP Poll released prior to the game; Source:

== Game summaries ==
=== At No. 2 Miami (FL) ===
	1	2	3	4	Total
No. 10 Cougars	0	3	0	7	10
No. 2 Hurricanes	14	16	7	3	40

== Roster ==
1991 Houston Cougars football team roster
Players
Coaches
Offense

Pos.	#	Name	Class
WR		John Brown	Sr
WR		Freddie Gilbert
QB	7	David Klingler	Sr

Defense

Pos.	#	Name	Class
LB		Glenn Cadrez	Sr

Special teams

Pos.	#	Name	Class
K		Roman Anderson	Sr

Head coach

- John Jenkins

Coordinators/assistant coaches

Legend

- (C) Team captain
- (S) Suspended
- (I) Ineligible
- Injured
- Redshirt

== After the season ==
=== NFL draft ===
The following Cougars were selected in the 1992 NFL draft after the season.

Round	Pick	Player	Position	NFL team
1	6	David Klingler	Quarterback	Cincinnati Bengals
6	154	Glenn Cadrez	Linebacker	New York Jets
7	192	John Brown	Wide receiver	Chicago Bears
9	226	Ostell Miles	Running back	Cincinnati Bengals
11	303	Mike Gisler	Defensive tackle	New Orleans Saints
