= 1991 Copper Bowl =

- 3rd Copper Bowl
Indiana Hoosiers	Baylor Bears
(6–4–1)	(8–3)
Big Ten	SWC
24	0
Head coach: Bill Mallory	Head coach: Grant Teaff
	1	2	3	4	Total
Indiana	7	10	0	7	24
Baylor	0	0	0	0	0
- Date: December 31, 1991
- Season: 1991
- Stadium: Arizona Stadium
- Location: Tucson, Arizona
- MVP: Vaughn Dunbar (TB, Indiana) & Mark Hagen (LB, Indiana)
- Referee: Dick Burleson (SEC)
- Attendance: 35,751

United States TV coverage
- Network: TBS
- Announcers: Ron Thulin and Pat Haden

The 1991 Copper Bowl was an American college football bowl game played on December 31, 1991, at Arizona Stadium in Tucson, Arizona. The game featured the Indiana Hoosiers and the Baylor Bears.

In the first quarter, Indiana quarterback Trent Green scored on a 1-yard touchdown run making it 7–0 Indiana. In the second quarter, Indiana got a 27-yard field goal from Bonnell making the lead 10–0. Vaughn Dunbar scored on a 5-yard touchdown run giving Indiana a 17–0 halftime lead. In the fourth quarter, Trent Green scored on a 4-yard touchdown run, making the final margin 24–0.

== Aftermath ==
The 1991 Copper Bowl was Indiana's last bowl win prior to the 2026 Rose Bowl College Football Playoff quarterfinal against Alabama during their national championship season. The 34-year drought was the second-longest in the FBS at the time it was broken.

== Statistics ==
Statistics	Indiana	Baylor
First downs	20	17
Rushes-yards	49-147	46-138
Passing yards	226	172
Passes, Comp-Att-Int	12-22-0	10-27-1
Return yards	10	53
Punts-average	6-49.0	6-34.8
Fumbles-lost	2-0	4-1
Penalties-yards	6-59	4-29
Time of Possession	32:55	27:05
