= Sean Snyder =

American football player and coach (born 1969)

Biographical details
- Born: September 21, 1969 (age 57)

Playing career
- 1989: Iowa
- 1990–1992: Kansas State
- Position: Punter

Coaching career (HC unless noted)
- 1994–2010: Kansas State (DFO)
- 2011–2018: Kansas State (AHC/ST)
- 2019: Kansas State (STA)
- 2020–2021: USC (ST)
- 2022: Illinois (ST)
- 2023: Kansas (AC)
- 2024: Oklahoma State (PKS)

Accomplishments and honors

Awards
- Player: Consensus All-American (1992); First-team All-Big Eight (1992); Big Eight Defensive Newcomer of the Year (1991); Kansas State Ring of Honor Coach: Football Scoop Special Teams Coordinator of the Year (2015); Special Teams Coach of the Year (ESPN) (2017); Special Teams Coach of the Year (Phil Steele) (2015, 2017)

Sean Snyder (born September 21, 1969) is an American football coach who coaches the kickers and punters for the Oklahoma State football program. He played college football at Kansas State, where he was an All-American punter.

Snyder is the son of former Kansas State head football coach Bill Snyder.

== Early life ==
Snyder earned first-team all-area and second-team all-district honors as a punter and kicker at Greenville High School in Greenville, Texas. He also played baseball.

== College career ==
After redshirting his first season at the University of Iowa in 1988, Snyder saw action in two games for the Hawkeyes as a redshirt freshman in 1989. He transferred to Kansas State, following his father, Bill. Due to NCAA rules, he was forced to sit out the 1990 season. In 1991, as a junior, he was named the 1991 Big Eight Defensive Newcomer of the Year by the conference coaches after finishing fourth in the league and 27th nationally with a 40.5 punting average. He also earned honorable mention All-Big Eight honors from the Associated Press and the coaches and out-punted six of his seven Big Eight counterparts in head-to-head matchups, including all three punters that finished ahead of him in the overall statistics.

In 1992 as a senior, he was named first-team All-American by the AP and the AFCA and was named the First first-team All-American at Kansas State since Gary Spani in 1977, a span of 15 years. Snyder finished his senior season by rewriting the Kansas State punting record book and broke the Wildcat records for best punting average with 52.8 yards per punt. He was also a first team All-Big Eight selection by the Associated Press and the league's coaches. He had at least one punt of 52 yards or more in all but one game and has booted at least one 60-yarder in four of 11 games.

=== Career statistics ===
Year	Team	G	No	Yards	Avg	Long
1989	Iowa	11	7	237	33.9	47
1991	Kansas State	11	55	2,228	40.5	64
1992	Kansas State	11	80	3,572	44.7	46
	Career Totals	33	142	6,037	42.5	64
