= 1991 SMU Mustangs football team =

American college football season

1991 SMU Mustangs football
- Conference: Southwest Conference
- Record: 1–10 (0–8 SWC)
- Head coach: Tom Rossley (1st season)
- Offensive coordinator: Mike Wade (1st season)
- Offensive scheme: Run and shoot
- Defensive coordinator: Jon Tenuta (2nd season)
- Base defense: 4–3
- Home stadium: Ownby Stadium; Cotton Bowl

1991 Southwest Conference football standings
| | Conf. | | | | | Overall |
| Team | W | | L | | T | W | | L | | T |
|---|---|---|---|---|---|---|---|---|---|---|
| No. 12 Texas A&M $ | 8 | – | 0 | – | 0 | 10 | – | 2 | – | 0 |
| Baylor | 5 | – | 3 | – | 0 | 8 | – | 4 | – | 0 |
| Texas Tech | 5 | – | 3 | – | 0 | 6 | – | 5 | – | 0 |
| Arkansas | 5 | – | 3 | – | 0 | 6 | – | 6 | – | 0 |
| TCU | 4 | – | 4 | – | 0 | 7 | – | 4 | – | 0 |
| Texas | 4 | – | 4 | – | 0 | 5 | – | 6 | – | 0 |
| Houston | 3 | – | 5 | – | 0 | 4 | – | 7 | – | 0 |
| Rice | 2 | – | 6 | – | 0 | 4 | – | 7 | – | 0 |
| SMU | 0 | – | 8 | – | 0 | 1 | – | 10 | – | 0 |
$ – Conference champion; Rankings from AP Poll

The 1991 SMU Mustangs football team represented Southern Methodist University (SMU) as a member of the Southwest Conference (SWC) during the 1991 NCAA Division I-A football season. Led by first-year head coach Tom Rossley, the Mustangs compiled an overall record of 1–10 with a mark of 0–8 in conference play, placing last out of nine teams in the SWC.

== Schedule ==
| Date | Time | Opponent | Site | TV | Result | Attendance | Source |
|---|---|---|---|---|---|---|---|
| September 7 | 7:00 p.m. | at Arkansas | War Memorial Stadium; Little Rock, AR | | L 6–17 | 49,216 | |
| September 14 | 6:00 p.m. | at Vanderbilt* | Vanderbilt Stadium; Nashville, TN | | L 11–14 | 31,104 | |
| September 28 | 12:00 p.m. | No. 12 Baylor | Ownby Stadium; University Park, TX | Raycom | L 7–45 | 22,239 | |
| October 5 | 7:00 p.m. | at Tulane* | Louisiana Superdome; New Orleans, LA | | W 31–17 | 19,708 | |
| October 12 | 2:00 p.m. | Texas Tech | Ownby Stadium; University Park, TX | | L 14–38 | 22,412 | |
| October 19 | 4:00 p.m. | at Houston | Houston Astrodome; Houston, TX (rivalry) | | L 20–49 | 17,339 | |
| October 26 | 2:00 p.m. | Texas | Cotton Bowl; Dallas, TX | | L 0–34 | 26,000 | |
| November 2 | 2:00 p.m. | at TCU | Amon G. Carter Stadium; Fort Worth, TX (rivalry) | | L 10–18 | 24,021 | |
| November 9 | 2:00 p.m. | Rice^{†} | Ownby Stadium; University Park, TX (rivalry) | | L 10–31 | 13,100 | |
| November 23 | 2:00 p.m. | at No. 12 Texas A&M | Kyle Field; College Station, TX | | L 6–65 | 52,523 | |
| November 30 | 2:00 p.m. | No. 22 Tulsa* | Ownby Stadium; University Park, TX | | L 26–31 | 7,900 | |
*Non-conference game; ^{†}Homecoming; Rankings from AP Poll released prior to the game; All times are in Central time; Source:

== Roster ==
1991 SMU Mustangs football team roster
Players
Coaches
Offense

| Pos. | # | Name | Class |
|---|---|---|---|
| OL | 79 | Trey Cowan | Jr |
| WR | 22 | Mick Rossley | Fr |
| WR | 33 | Jason Wolf | Jr |

Defense

| Pos. | # | Name | Class |
|---|---|---|---|
| DB | 40 | Cary Brabham | Jr |
| DB | 28 | Marcello Simmons | Jr |
| DB | 9 | Marcus Malonson | Jr |

Special teams

| Pos. | # | Name | Class |

Head coach

- Tom Rossley

Coordinators/assistant coaches

- Joe Loth (GA)

Legend

- (C) Team captain
- (S) Suspended
- (I) Ineligible
- Injured
- Redshirt
