= 1991 Texas Tech Red Raiders football team =

American college football season

1991 Texas Tech Red Raiders football
- Conference: Southwest Conference
- Record: 6–5 (5–3 SWC)
- Head coach: Spike Dykes (5th season)
- Offensive coordinator: Dick Winder (5th season)
- Offensive scheme: No-huddle spread
- Defensive coordinator: Carlos Mainord (5th season)
- Base defense: 3–4
- Captain: Ronnie Gossett DT
- Home stadium: Jones Stadium

1991 Southwest Conference football standings
	Conf.					Overall
Team	W		L		T	W		L		T
No. 12 Texas A&M $	8	–	0	–	0	10	–	2	–	0
Baylor	5	–	3	–	0	8	–	4	–	0
Texas Tech	5	–	3	–	0	6	–	5	–	0
Arkansas	5	–	3	–	0	6	–	6	–	0
TCU	4	–	4	–	0	7	–	4	–	0
Texas	4	–	4	–	0	5	–	6	–	0
Houston	3	–	5	–	0	4	–	7	–	0
Rice	2	–	6	–	0	4	–	7	–	0
SMU	0	–	8	–	0	1	–	10	–	0
$ – Conference champion; Rankings from AP Poll

The 1991 Texas Tech Red Raiders football team represented Texas Tech University as a member of the Southwest Conference (SWC) during the 1991 NCAA Division I-A football season. In their fifth season under head coach Spike Dykes, the Red Raiders compiled a 6–5 record (5–3 against SWC opponents), finished in a tie for second place in the conference, and outscored opponents by a combined total of 315 to 272. The team played its home games at Clifford B. and Audrey Jones Stadium in Lubbock, Texas.

== Schedule ==
Date	Time	Opponent	Site	TV	Result	Attendance	Source
September 7	7:00 p.m.	Cal State Fullerton*	Jones Stadium; Lubbock, TX		W 41–7	36,228	
September 14	7:00 p.m.	Oregon*	Jones Stadium; Lubbock, TX		L 13–28	36,308	
September 21	1:00 p.m.	at Wyoming*	War Memorial Stadium; Laramie, WY		L 17–22	18,183	
September 28	7:00 p.m.	TCU^{†}	Jones Stadium; Lubbock, TX (rivalry)		L 16–30	40,276	
October 5	12:00 p.m.	No. 23 Texas A&M	Jones Stadium; Lubbock, TX (rivalry)	Raycom	L 14–37	50,577	
October 12	2:00 p.m.	at SMU	Ownby Stadium; University Park, TX		W 38–14	22,412	
October 26	2:00 p.m.	Rice	Jones Stadium; Lubbock, TX		W 40–20	32,144	
November 2	12:00 p.m.	at Texas	Texas Memorial Stadium; Austin, TX (rivalry)	Raycom	L 15–23	74,873	
November 9	12:00 p.m.	Arkansas	Jones Stadium; Lubbock, TX (rivalry)	Raycom	W 38–21	31,895	
November 16	1:00 p.m.	at No. 20 Baylor	Floyd Casey Stadium; Waco, TX (rivalry)		W 31–24	36,163	
November 30	2:00 p.m.	at Houston	Houston Astrodome; Houston, TX (rivalry)		W 52–46	18,114	
*Non-conference game; ^{†}Homecoming; Rankings from AP Poll released prior to the game; All times are in Central time; Source:
