= Melvin Bonner =

American football player (born 1970)

No. 83, 82
- Position: Wide receiver

Personal information
- Born: February 18, 1970 (age 56); Hempstead, Texas, U.S.
- Listed height: 6 ft 3 in (1.91 m)
- Listed weight: 207 lb (94 kg)

Career information
- High school: Van Vleck (TX)
- College: Baylor
- NFL draft: 1993: 6th round, 154th overall pick

Career history
- Denver Broncos (1993-1994); Washington Redskins (1995)*
- * Offseason or practice squad member only

Awards and highlights
- First-team All-SWC (1992); Second-team All-SWC (1991)
- Stats at Pro Football Reference

Melvin Bonner (born February 18, 1970) is an American former professional football player who was a wide receiver for the Denver Broncos of the National Football League (NFL) in 1993. He played college football for the Baylor Bears.
