= Tom Rossley =

American football coach (born 1946)

Biographical details
- Born: August 9, 1946 (age 80); Painesville, Ohio, U.S.

Playing career
- 1967–1968: Cincinnati
- Position: Wide receiver

Coaching career (HC unless noted)
- 1977: Cincinnati (WR)
- 1978–1981: Rice (QB)
- 1982–1984: Montreal Concordes (RB/WR)
- 1985: San Antonio Gunslingers (OC)
- 1986–1987: Holy Cross (OC/QB)
- 1988–1989: SMU (OC/QB)
- 1990: Atlanta Falcons (QB)
- 1991–1996: SMU
- 1997–1998: Chicago Bears (WR/TE)
- 1999: Kansas City Chiefs (QB)
- 2000–2005: Green Bay Packers (OC)
- 2008–2011: Texas A&M (QB)

Head coaching record
- Overall: 15–48–3

Accomplishments and honors

Awards
- SWC Co-Coach of the Year (1992)

Tom Rossley (born August 9, 1946) is an American former football coach and player. He was the head football coach at Southern Methodist University (SMU) from 1991 to 1996, compiling a record of 15–48–3.

== Coaching career ==
=== Early career ===
Rossley started his coaching career in 1969 at the high school level. After serving as a graduate assistant coach at the University of Arkansas in 1972, Rossley worked as an offensive assistant coach at one high school and several colleges. These coaching jobs were at Lake Worth High School, the University of Cincinnati (his alma mater), Rice University, Holy Cross, and Southern Methodist University, respectively. He also spent time coaching in the Canadian Football League, Arena Football League, and the now defunct United States Football League.

While at Holy Cross, Rossley worked with future Green Bay Packers head coach Mike Sherman, where the two became friends and established a successful working relationship. Rossley's job at Southern Methodist led to the head coaching position, after a one-year foray into the NFL, where he worked as a quarterbacks coach for the Atlanta Falcons in 1990.

=== SMU ===
Rossley was the head coach at Southern Methodist University from 1991 to 1996, where he inherited a team only two seasons back from the "Death Penalty" punishment by the NCAA, where the entire 1987 and 1988 football seasons were canceled. Rossley inherited a team that was 3–19 in the two seasons since the football program was reinstated, but quickly earned Southwest Conference Co-Coach of the Year for impressively turning around the 1–10 Mustangs with a respectable 5–6 record in 1992.

=== NFL ===
After leaving the Mustangs, Rossley spent two years as an assistant with the Chicago Bears and one year with the Kansas City Chiefs before being offered the Packers offensive coordinator position in 2000 by his former colleague Mike Sherman, who was at the time putting together his Green Bay coaching staff.

In early 2006, Sherman was fired by the Packers after a disappointing 4–12 season. The new head coach, Mike McCarthy released much of the coaching staff after he was hired, including Rossley.

=== Texas A&M ===
Sherman, now head coach at Texas A&M, named Rossley the quarterbacks coach/senior assistant on January 26, 2008. Under the tutelage of Rossley, quarterback Jerrod Johnson was arguably the nation's most improved player. Johnson shattered numerous school records including an A&M record 28 touchdowns and became the first player in A&M history to surpass 3,000 yards through the air (3,217). Along with posting five 300-yard passing games, Johnson ran for eight touchdowns and 455 yards.

In 2009, Rossley was selected as the FootballScoop Quarterbacks Coach of the Year. Rossley was nominated by his peers and was selected by a panel of coaches, former coaches, and previous winners. Other finalists for the award were Mike Bajakian (Central Michigan), Dana Holgorsen (Houston), and Greg Forest (Cincinnati).

Rossley recruited future Heisman Trophy-winning quarterback Johnny Manziel to Texas A&M.

== Head coaching record ==
Year	Team	Overall	Conference	Standing
SMU Mustangs (Southwest Conference) (1991–1995)
1991	SMU	1–10	0–8	9th
1992	SMU	5–6	2–5	T–6th
1993	SMU	2–7–2	1–5–1	T–7th
1994	SMU	1–9–1	0–6–1	8th
1995	SMU	1–10	0–7	8th
SMU Mustangs (Western Athletic Conference) (1996)
1996	SMU	5–6	4–4	4th (Mountain)
SMU:		15–48–3	8–35–2	
Total:		15–48–3		
