= Keith Alex =

American football player (born 1969)

No. 62, 63
- Position: Guard

Personal information
- Born: June 9, 1969 (age 57); Kountze, Texas, U.S.
- Listed height: 6 ft 4 in (1.93 m)
- Listed weight: 307 lb (139 kg)

Career information
- High school: Central (Beaumont, Texas)
- College: Texas A&M
- NFL draft: 1992: 9th round, 243rd overall pick

Career history
- Atlanta Falcons (1993); Minnesota Vikings (1995); Denver Broncos (1997)*
- * Offseason or practice squad member only

Awards and highlights
- First-team All-SWC (1991)

Career NFL statistics
- Games played: 14
- Stats at Pro Football Reference

Hiram Keith Alex (born June 9, 1969) is an American former professional football player who was a guard in the National Football League (NFL). He played for the Atlanta Falcons (1993) and the Minnesota Vikings (1995). Alex was a four-year letterman playing college football for the Texas A&M Aggies from 1987 to 1992. Following his senior year in 1991, he received honorable mention All-American accolades by the Football News and was also selected as an Associated Press First-team All-Southwest Conference offensive tackle. Alex was the ninth-round pick (243rd overall) of the Atlanta Falcons in the 1992 NFL draft. He is currently a physical education teacher and football coach at Cypress Springs High School. Alex has coached at Texas A&M as a graduate assistant coach, Arizona Western College as the offensive line coach, and in high school for the last eleven years.
