= Carlton McDonald =

American football player (born 1971)

Profile
- Position: Cornerback

Personal information
- Born: February 20, 1971

Career information
- College: United States Air Force Academy

Career history
- 1992: Air Force Falcons

Awards and highlights
- Unanimous All-American (1992); 2x WAC Defensive Player of the Year (1991, 1992); 2x First-team All-WAC (1991, 1992)

Carlton R. McDonald (born February 20, 1971) is an American former football player. He was a consensus All-American defensive back while playing for the Air Force Falcons football team in 1992.

== Air Force Academy ==
McDonald attended the United States Air Force Academy at Colorado Springs, Colorado. While attending the Academy, he played at the cornerback position for the Air Force Falcons football team from 1989 to 1992 under head coach Fisher DeBerry. In the 1990 Liberty Bowl, McDonald intercepted two passes, including one late in the game that he returned 40 yards for a touchdown to clinch the Falcons' 23-11 victory over Ohio State.

As a senior, McDonald was selected as a consensus defensive back on the 1992 College Football All-America Team. He was also selected as the Western Athletic Conference defensive player of the year in both 1991 and 1992. He also finished second in the voting for the 1992 Thorpe Award, presented to the top defensive back in college football since 1986. During his playing career, he was six feet tall and weighed 195 pounds.

== Later life ==
After graduating from the Air Force Academy in 1993, McDonald served five years in the Air Force as a finance officer. He subsequently became employed by Winn-Dixie at its headquarters in Jacksonville, Florida. He also became a pilot for the Florida Air National Guard. In 2013, he was inducted into the Air Force Academy's Sports Hall of Fame.
