= John Parrella =

American football player and coach (born 1969)

No. 92, 97
- Position: Defensive tackle

Personal information
- Born: November 22, 1969 (age 56); Topeka, Kansas, U.S.
- Listed height: 6 ft 3 in (1.91 m)
- Listed weight: 300 lb (136 kg)

Career information
- High school: Grand Island (NE) Central Catholic
- College: Nebraska
- NFL draft: 1993: 2nd round, 55th overall pick

Career history

Playing
- Buffalo Bills (1993); San Diego Chargers (1994–2001); Oakland Raiders (2002–2004); St. Louis Rams (2005)*
- * Offseason or practice squad member only

Coaching
- Dublin (CA) Valley Christian HS (2009–2012) Head coach; Chabot College (2013) Assistant coach; Northern Michigan (2014–2015) Defensive line coach; Nebraska (2016–2017) Defensive line coach; Cleveland Browns (2019) Assistant defensive line coach; Lutheran High School West (2021–2025) Head coach

Awards and highlights
- First-team All-Big Eight (1992)

Career NFL statistics
- Tackles: 407
- Sacks: 26.5
- Forced fumbles: 5
- Stats at Pro Football Reference

John Lorin Parrella (born November 22, 1969) is an American football coach and former defensive tackle who was the head coach at Lutheran West High School in Rocky River, Ohio. He resigned in December 2025. Parrella was the assistant defensive line coach for the Cleveland Browns of the National Football League (NFL) in 2019. He previously served as the former defensive line coach for the University of Nebraska–Lincoln. He played college football at Nebraska and was selected by the Buffalo Bills in the second round of the 1993 NFL draft.

== Playing career ==
Parrella was selected by the Buffalo Bills in the second round of the 1993 NFL draft. Parrella played most of his career with the San Diego Chargers from 1994 to 2001. He proved to be a reliable defender on the interior as a defensive tackle starting in 1996, routinely finishing with more than 30 tackles a year through 2002. His best seasons came in 1999 and 2000 when he recorded 5.5 and 7.0 Sacks along with 5 combined forced fumbles. He also played for the Oakland Raiders from 2002 to 2004. He would record 1 Sack with 41 tackles in 2002.

== Coaching career ==
=== High School and College coaching ===
From 2009 to 2012, Parrella served as the head coach at Valley Christian High School.

In 2013, Parrella was hired as an assistant coach at Chabot College.

Parrella then served as the defensive line coach at Northern Michigan University from 2014 to 2015.

On February 22, 2016, Parrella was hired at Nebraska as its defensive line coach. Following the 2017 season, he was not retained with the new staff in December 2017.

=== Cleveland Browns ===
On January 18, 2019, Parrella was hired by the Cleveland Browns as an assistant defensive line coach.
