= Orangefield Independent School District =

School district in Texas, United States

Address
- 9974 FM 105 Orangefield, Texas, 77639; United States

District information
- Type: Public
- Grades: PK–12
- Schools: 3
- NCES District ID: 4833780

Students and staff
- Students: 1,809 (2023–2024)
- Teachers: 132.89 (on an FTE basis) (2023–2024)
- Staff: 138.99 (on an FTE basis) (2023–2024)
- Student–teacher ratio: 13.61 (2023–2024)

Other information
- Website: www.orangefieldisd.net

Orangefield Independent School District is a public school district based in the community of Orangefield, Texas (USA).

In 2009, the school district was rated "recognized" by the Texas Education Agency.

== Schools ==
- Orangefield High School (Grades 9-12)
- Orangefield Junior High (Grades 4-8)
- Orangefield Elementary (Grades PK-5)
