= Mike Jones (tight end) =

American football player (born 1966)

Mike L. Jones
No. 82, 47
- Positions: Tight end, quarterback

Personal information
- Born: November 10, 1966 (age 59); Bridgeport, Connecticut, U.S.
- Listed height: 6 ft 3 in (1.91 m)
- Listed weight: 255 lb (116 kg)

Career information
- High school: Bridgeport (CT) Warren Harding
- College: Texas A&M
- NFL draft: 1990: 3rd round, 54th overall pick

Career history
- Minnesota Vikings (1990–1991); Seattle Seahawks (1992); Indianapolis Colts (1993–1994)

Awards and highlights
- First-team All-SWC (1989)

Career NFL statistics
- Receptions: 5
- Receiving yards: 26
- Receiving touchdowns: 2
- Stats at Pro Football Reference

Michael Lenere Jones (born November 10, 1966) is an American former professional football player in the National Football League (NFL). A native of Bridgeport, Connecticut, Jones was a three-sport star and high school all-American amassing several state championships for Warren Harding High School. He attended the University of Michigan on a football and baseball scholarship. While at Harding he played football, basketball and baseball winning 9 total state championships and was a high school All-American in all three sports. He was a 4 time all state basketball, football and 2 time baseball player.

He had a tryout and was offered a contract for the NY Yankees but ultimately chose football and college. He played college football for the 1985 Michigan Wolverines football team as a backup quarterback behind Jim Harbaugh. With Harbaugh securely entrenched in the starting quarterback spot, Jones transferred to Sacramento City Junior College, after one year at Michigan. While at Sacramento City College, he was a two-time All-America, catching 46 passes for 543 yards and 6 touchdowns in 1987. He would transfer to play college football at the tight end position for the Texas A&M Aggies football team from 1988 to 1989 where he obtained All- American honors.

Pre-draft measurables
Height	Weight	Arm length	Hand span	40-yard dash	10-yard split	20-yard split	Vertical jump	Broad jump	Bench press
6 ft 3 1/8 in (1.91 m)	255 lb (116 kg)	33 3/4 in (0.86 m)	9 in (0.23 m)	4.77 s	1.67 s	2.77 s	27.5 in (0.70 m)	8 ft 6 in (2.59 m)	15 reps

He was selected by the Vikings in the third round of the 1990 NFL draft. He played professional football as a tight end for the Minnesota Vikings from 1990 to 1991 and for the Seattle Seahawks in 1992. Also playing for the Indianapolis Colts. Jones has recently served as an advanced scout and assistant coach for the Minnesota Vikings as well as New England Patriots and Philadelphia Eagles.

Jones is also a member of Omega Psi Phi.
