= Derrick Frazier =

American football player (born 1970)

No. 23, 31
- Position: Cornerback

Personal information
- Born: April 29, 1970 (age 56); Sugar Land, Texas, U.S.
- Listed height: 5 ft 11 in (1.80 m)
- Listed weight: 178 lb (81 kg)

Career information
- High school: Clements (Sugar Land, Texas)
- College: Texas A&M
- NFL draft: 1993: 3rd round, 75th overall pick

Career history
- Philadelphia Eagles (1993–1995); Indianapolis Colts (1996); Dallas Cowboys (1996); Los Angeles Rams (1998)*
- * Offseason or practice squad member only

Awards and highlights
- Second-team All-SWC (1991)

Career NFL statistics
- Tackles: 42
- Interceptions: 1
- Fumble recoveries: 1
- Stats at Pro Football Reference

Derrick Lothair Frazier (born April 29, 1970) is an American former professional football player who was a cornerback in the National Football League (NFL). He was selected by the Philadelphia Eagles in the third round of the 1993 NFL draft and played for the team from 1993 to 1995. He also played for the Indianapolis Colts and Dallas Cowboys. He played college football for the Texas A&M Aggies.

== Professional career ==
Frazier was selected by the Philadelphia Eagles in the third round (75th overall) of the 1993 NFL draft with a pick obtained from the Houston Oilers in a trade. On July 14, 1993, Frazier signed two one-year contracts with the team with an option year. While competing for the starting left cornerback job in the preseason, he injured his right knee during an American Bowl loss to the New Orleans Saints in Tokyo on July 31. He was placed on injured reserve on August 24.

Frazier played in twelve games in 1994 with a fumble recovery and three tackles. After Eric Allen left the team following the season, Frazier was expected to start at right cornerback in 1995. Frazier had 26 tackles and one interception in 1995.

Following the 1995 season, Frazier signed with the Indianapolis Colts after his contract expired with the Eagles. He broke his right arm early in the 1996 season, but managed to start in four games for the Colts and record 13 tackles. He was waived in the first week of December and was signed by the Dallas Cowboys.

== After football ==
Frazier and former Texas A&M roommate Quentin Coryatt created a men's lifestyle magazine, Controversy, in 2002.

Frazier was married to fellow Aggie, Candice Manning. He shares one daughter with her, another fellow Aggie, Tia Frazier. He is currently married to Leslee Frazier and shares 1 son and 3 stepsons with her.

Frazier coaches high school football in Gilbert, Arizona.
