= Kevin Smith (cornerback) =

American football player (born 1970)

No. 26
- Position: Cornerback

Personal information
- Born: April 7, 1970 (age 56); Orange, Texas, U.S.
- Listed height: 5 ft 11 in (1.80 m)
- Listed weight: 190 lb (86 kg)

Career information
- High school: West Orange-Stark (Orange)
- College: Texas A&M
- NFL draft: 1992: 1st round, 17th overall pick

Career history
- Dallas Cowboys (1992–2000)

Awards and highlights
- 3× Super Bowl champion (XXVII, XXVIII, XXX); Second-team All-Pro (1996); Consensus All-American (1991); 3× First-team All-SWC (1989–1991)

Career NFL statistics
- Interceptions: 20
- Interceptions yards: 190
- Touchdowns: 1
- Stats at Pro Football Reference
- College Football Hall of Fame

Kevin Rey Smith (born April 7, 1970) is an American former professional football player who was a cornerback for nine seasons with the Dallas Cowboys of the National Football League (NFL). He played college football for the Texas A&M Aggies, earning consensus All-American honors in 1991. Smith won three Super Bowls with the Cowboys.

== Early life ==
Smith help lead West Orange-Stark High School to back to back 4A State Championships (1986–1987). He earned All-State on both sides of the ball his senior year, after intercepting 12 passes and catching 9 touchdowns. Smith was also a letterman in baseball, basketball and track and field.

He was recruited to play wide receiver for University of Houston and Louisiana State University.

== College career ==
Smith attended Texas A&M University, where he played cornerback for the Aggies. In 1991 the Aggies allowed only 222.4 yards per game to lead the nation in total defense. He helped win the Southwest Conference championship in 1991 and 1992.

As a senior, he was called upon to return kicks midway through the season. He quickly made his mark returning one punt 71 yards for a touchdown against Rice University and latter adding a 73-yard touchdown kickoff return against Texas. He finished the season with the sixth best punt return average in the nation and scored six special teams touchdowns.

Smith owns the all-time Aggie interception and Southwest Conference record with 20. He was an All-SWC selection for 3 straight years, a semifinalist for the Jim Thorpe Award given to the nation's best defensive back and was a consensus All-American in 1991. He is arguably the greatest cornerback in Texas A&M University history and was inducted into the Texas A&M Athletic Hall of Fame in 1997. 2024 College Football Hall of Fame

== Professional career ==
Pre-draft measurables
Height	Weight	Arm length	Hand span	40-yard dash	10-yard split	20-yard split	20-yard shuttle	Vertical jump	Broad jump	Bench press
5 ft 10 3/4 in (1.80 m)	173 lb (78 kg)	31 1/4 in (0.79 m)	8 3/8 in (0.21 m)	4.49 s	1.56 s	2.61 s	4.13 s	37.5 in (0.95 m)	10 ft 6 in (3.20 m)	10 reps
All values from NFL Combine

Smith was drafted in the first round of the 1992 NFL draft by the Dallas Cowboys with the 17th overall pick. He became the starting left cornerback late in his rookie season, helping the team win their first Super Bowl since the 1970s. In his second season, he led the Cowboys with six interceptions and teamed with Larry Brown to form the youngest set of starting cornerbacks in the NFL. In 1994 he led the team with 17 passes defended.

Smith tore his Achilles tendon in the first game of the 1995 season against the New York Giants on Monday Night Football. While recovering from the injury, Smith appeared in a Nike commercial with newly-signed Deion Sanders, using crutches and playing the role of "The Gipper".

In 1996 he regained his starting position, and had five interceptions and established a career-high with 18 passes defensed.

Including 1998, Smith led the Cowboys in passes defensed every year he was in the league, except 1992 (rookie season) and 1995 (missed due to injury). He ended up winning three Super Bowls in his first four seasons.

In 1999 he reported to training camp with a back injury and missed eight regular season games. Smith's final season was in 2000, retiring after hurting his knee during training camp. He played nine seasons in the NFL, intercepting 19 passes and returning one for a touchdown.

=== NFL statistics ===
Year	Team	Games		Tackles				Fumbles			Interceptions					
Year	Team	GP	GS	Cmb	Solo	Ast	Sacks	FF	FR	Yds	Int	Yds	Avg	Long	TDs	PDs
1992	DAL	16	6	0	0	0	0.0	0	0	0	2	10	5.0	7	0	0
1993	DAL	16	16	78	69	9	0.0	2	1	14	6	56	9.3	32	1	18
1994	DAL	16	16	62	53	9	0.0	0	0	0	2	11	5.5	11	0	15
1995	DAL	1	1	3	3	0	0.0	0	0	0	0	0	0.0	0	0	0
1996	DAL	16	16	51	48	3	0.0	0	0	0	5	45	9.0	24	0	14
1997	DAL	16	16	51	44	7	0.0	2	0	0	1	21	21.0	21	0	19
1998	DAL	14	14	55	50	5	0.0	1	0	0	2	31	15.5	22	0	15
1999	DAL	8	8	14	11	3	0.0	0	0	0	1	16	16.0	16	0	10
Career		103	93	314	278	36	0.0	5	1	14	19	190	10.0	32	1	91

== Personal life ==
After retiring from the NFL, Smith would return for one season as the color commentator of Texas A&M football games (where he worked with longtime Aggie play-by-play man Dave South).
