= Marcus Buckley =

American football player (born 1971)

No. 55
- Position: Linebacker

Personal information
- Born: February 3, 1971 (age 55); Fort Worth, Texas, U.S.
- Listed height: 6 ft 3 in (1.91 m)
- Listed weight: 240 lb (109 kg)

Career information
- High school: Eastern Hills (Fort Worth)
- College: Texas A&M
- NFL draft: 1993: 3rd round, 66th overall pick

Career history
- New York Giants (1993–1999); Atlanta Falcons (2000)

Awards and highlights
- Unanimous All-American (1992); SWC Defensive Player of the Year (1992); 2× First-team All-SWC (1991, 1992)

Career NFL statistics
- Tackles: 143
- Sacks: 1.5
- Interceptions: 1
- Fumbles recovered: 4
- Stats at Pro Football Reference

Marcus Wayne Buckley (born February 3, 1971) is an American former professional football player who was a linebacker for seven seasons in the National Football League (NFL) during the 1990s. He played college football for the Texas A&M Aggies, earning unanimous All-American honors in 1992. He played his entire pro career for the New York Giants.

== Early life ==
Buckley was born in Fort Worth, Texas. He graduated from Eastern Hills High School in Fort Worth, where he played for the Eastern Hills Highlanders high school football team.

== College career ==
Buckley accepted an athletic scholarship to attend Texas A&M University, and played for the Texas A&M Aggies football team from 1989 to 1992. He was recognized as a unanimous All-American at linebacker in 1992.

== Professional career ==
The New York Giants picked Buckley in the third round, 66th pick overall, of the 1993 NFL draft. He played for the Giants from 1993 to 1999. In seven NFL seasons, he played in 101 regular season games for the Giants, started 25 of them, and compiled 137 tackles. He was on the Atlanta Falcons 2000 roster, but played no games.

On January 25, 2018, after an investigation by the FBI for ties to a $1.5 million insurance fraud scheme, Buckley was sentenced to 24 months in federal prison. On April 10, 2013, he was indicted and charged with insurance fraud along with a co-conspirator, Kimberly Jones. The charges allege that Buckley made false workers compensation claims related to stress-related injuries from playing football.
