= Chris Crooms =

American football player (born 1969)

No. 25
- Position: Safety

Personal information
- Born: February 4, 1969 (age 57); Houston, Texas, U.S.
- Listed height: 6 ft 2 in (1.88 m)
- Listed weight: 211 lb (96 kg)

Career information
- High school: Robert E. Lee (Baytown, Texas)
- College: Texas A&M
- NFL draft: 1992: 5th round, 114th overall pick

Career history
- Los Angeles Rams (1992); Green Bay Packers (1993)*; Minnesota Vikings (1994)*; Oakland Raiders (1995)*; Barcelona Dragons (1995-1996)
- * Offseason or practice squad member only
- Stats at Pro Football Reference

Christopher Dale Crooms (born February 4, 1969) is an American former professional football player who was a safety in the National Football League (NFL) and the World League of American Football (WLAF). He played for the Los Angeles Rams of the NFL, and the Barcelona Dragons of the WLAF. He was selected by the Rams in the fifth round of the 1992 NFL draft. Crooms played collegiately at the Texas A&M University.
