= Patrick Bates =

American football player (born 1970)

No. 24, 29, 27
- Position: Safety

Personal information
- Born: November 27, 1970 (age 55); Galveston, Texas, U.S.
- Listed height: 6 ft 3 in (1.91 m)
- Listed weight: 215 lb (98 kg)

Career information
- High school: Ball (Galveston, Texas)
- College: UCLA; Texas A&M
- NFL draft: 1993: 1st round, 12th overall pick

Career history
- L.A./Oakland Raiders (1993–1994); Atlanta Falcons (1996); Oakland Raiders (1998)*
- * Offseason or practice squad member only

Awards and highlights
- First-team All-American (1992); 2× First-team All-SWC (1991, 1992)

Career NFL statistics
- Tackles: 135
- Interceptions: 1
- Fumble recoveries: 3
- Stats at Pro Football Reference

Patrick James Bates (born November 27, 1970) is an American former professional football player who was a safety in the National Football League (NFL). He was selected in the first round of the 1993 NFL draft by the Los Angeles Raiders and later played for the Atlanta Falcons after being traded by the Raiders in exchange for the Falcons' second-round selection in the 1996 NFL draft.

Out of high school, Bates played college football with the UCLA Bruins, but transferred to Texas A&M Aggies in 1991. Soon, Bates would become one of the best players of the A&M's famed "Wrecking Crew" of the early 1990s. In 1993, Bates was a first-round draft pick by the Los Angeles Raiders.

After several off-field mishaps, he never realized his full potential, which is why ESPN named him the 37th of the top 50 busts in NFL draft history.

== Personal life ==
As a child, Bates' mother Jean was an alcoholic, and Bates' older brother Jarvis was shot dead when he was 22 and Patrick was still a junior in high school. Bates, Jarvis, and their younger sister Sonia Nicole had spent time under foster care.

During his freshman year at UCLA, Bates' mother and grandmother Isabel Singleton died within a month of each other. Recently in 2019 he “remarried “ and had another child by Whitney S. in Galveston Texas where he now resides.
