= Bucky Richardson =

American football player (born 1969)

No. 7
- Position: Quarterback

Personal information
- Born: February 7, 1969 (age 57); Baton Rouge, Louisiana, U.S.
- Listed height: 6 ft 1 in (1.85 m)
- Listed weight: 228 lb (103 kg)

Career information
- High school: Broadmoor (Baton Rouge)
- College: Texas A&M
- NFL draft: 1992: 8th round, 220th overall pick

Career history
- Houston Oilers (1992–1994); New England Patriots (1995)*; Dallas Cowboys (1995)*; Kansas City Chiefs (1996)*
- * Offseason or practice squad member only

Awards and highlights
- SWC Offensive Player of the Year (1991); First-team All-SWC (1991)

Career NFL statistics
- Passing attempts: 185
- Passing completions: 97
- Completion percentage: 52.4%
- TD–INT: 6–6
- Passing yards: 1,257
- Passer rating: 71.4
- Stats at Pro Football Reference

John "Bucky" Powell Richardson (born February 7, 1969) is an American former professional football player who was a quarterback for the Houston Oilers of the National Football League (NFL). He played college football for the Texas A&M Aggies.

== Early life and college ==
Richardson attended Broadmoor High School in Baton Rouge, Louisiana, where he starred in both baseball and football. He played collegiately at Texas A&M University and made an immediate impact as a freshman coming off the bench and making his first appearance for the Aggies against Southern Miss and future NFL star Brett Favre, Richardson led the Aggies to a road victory in Jackson when he broke away in the fourth quarter on an 82-yard touchdown. In the Cotton Bowl Classic that same season against Notre Dame. Richardson was named MVP after leading the Aggies to a come from behind victory in the 2nd half.

Against BYU in the 1990 Holiday Bowl, Richardson compiled 402 yards of total offense (203 pass, 199 run). He rushed for two touchdowns, passed for a touchdown, and caught a touchdown pass. Richardson was also an All-Southwest Conference pick his senior season in 1991, leading the Aggies with 1492 passing yards. He finished in 10th place in the Heisman Trophy voting that year.

During his Texas A&M career, Richardson rushed for 2,095 yards, a conference record for QBs. He played in three bowl games with the Aggies and led them to two SWC Championships. He finished his Aggie career 24–6–1as a starter.

== Professional career ==
Pre-draft measurables
Height	Weight	Arm length	Hand span	40-yard dash	10-yard split	20-yard split	Vertical jump
6 ft 1 1/8 in (1.86 m)	225 lb (102 kg)	30 3/8 in (0.77 m)	9 1/4 in (0.23 m)	4.73 s	1.62 s	2.72 s	29.5 in (0.75 m)

Richardson was selected in the eighth round of the 1992 NFL draft with the 220th overall pick by the Houston Oilers. He played mostly in mop-up duty and even saw action on special teams during his first two seasons in the league, but when Oilers' QB Warren Moon was traded to the Vikings, Houston's quarterback position was up for grabs.

Incumbent backup Cody Carlson began the 1994 season under center, but when he separated his shoulder in the season opener, Richardson became the starting quarterback. He is fondly remembered during a preseason exhibition game against the Dallas Cowboys. Late in the game and down by one score, Richardson led the Oilers within striking distance. The drive culminated with a play during which he, a right-hander, completed the winning touchdown pass with his left arm.

Richardson was the starter for nearly half of the season and he split time with Carlson and Billy Joe Tolliver, none of the three being particularly effective as the Oilers stumbled their way to a league-worst 2–14 record. In Richardson's last regular season game as a pro, he passed for over 200 yards, leading the Oilers in a 24–10 victory over the New York Jets in the Oilers' 1994 season finale in what was Jeff Fisher's first win as an NFL head coach.

The Oilers released Richardson after drafting Steve McNair in April 1995.

The Dallas Cowboys signed Richardson in August 1995, planning to use him on special teams and to back up Daryl Johnston at fullback; however, Richardson did not see any regular-season action. The Kansas City Chiefs signed him the following year and he capped off a 1996 preseason victory with a touchdown pass for the Chiefs against his former team the Cowboys. Despite his preseason heroics, Richardson never saw action in another regular-season NFL game. He finished his career with 1,257 passing yards and 225 rushing yards on a 6.8 yards per carry average.

== Personal life ==
Richardson resides in the Houston suburb of Missouri City, Texas, with his wife Tracy and their three children. He is the co-owner of Environmental Improvements, Inc., a water and waste treatment company.
