= West Orange =

West Orange may refer to:

== Places ==
- West Orange, New Jersey, a township in Essex County
- West Orange, Texas, a city in Orange County

== Schools ==
- West Orange High School (New Jersey), a public school in West Orange, New Jersey
- West Orange High School, Winter Garden, a public school in Winter Garden, Florida
- West Orange Public Schools, a public school system in West Orange, New Jersey
- West Orange-Cove Consolidated Independent School District, a public school system in Orange County, Texas
- West Orange-Stark High School, a high school of the West Orange-Cove Consolidated ISD

== Other uses ==
- West Orange Trail, a multi-use trail in Orange County, Florida
