= Chris Cole (wide receiver) =

American gridiron football player (born 1977)

No. 84
- Position: Wide receiver

Personal information
- Born: October 12, 1977 (age 49); Orange, Texas, U.S.

Career information
- High school: West Orange-Stark (Orange, Texas)
- College: Texas A&M
- NFL draft: 2000: 3rd round, 70th overall pick

Career history
- Denver Broncos (2000–2003); Oakland Raiders (2004)*; Jacksonville Jaguars (2005)*; Edmonton Eskimos (2006); Los Angeles Avengers (2006–2007); Toronto Argonauts (2008)
- * Offseason or practice squad member only

Career NFL statistics
- Receptions: 12
- Receiving yards: 164
- Touchdowns: 0
- Stats at Pro Football Reference

Chris Cole (born October 12, 1977) is an American former professional football player who was a wide receiver for the Denver Broncos of the National Football League (NFL).

== Early life ==
Cole was a standout athlete at West Orange-Stark High School in Orange, Texas. In 1995, his senior season, he caught 53 passes for 860 yards and 14 touchdowns, helping lead his team to the Texas Class 4A State Football regional finals. Cole was also a member of the school's track and field team, and qualified for the Texas State Track and Field Championships in long jump and triple jump.

Cole was recruited by R. C. Slocum to play wide receiver for Texas A&M University. He lettered all four years that he played football for the Aggies (1996–1999). His 89 career receptions still rank at No. 10 on the school's all-time list. His most productive season came as a junior in 1998, when he led the Aggies in catches (38), receiving yards (667) and touchdowns (five). He totaled 89 passes caught for 1,383 yards and 8 touchdowns.

== Professional career ==
Cole was selected by the Denver Broncos in the third round of the 2000 NFL draft, as the 70th pick overall. He played four seasons for the Broncos, with his best season coming in 2001. That year, he played in all 16 of the Broncos' games, logging 9 receptions for 128 yards. His 48 kickoff returns that season tied the all-time single-season Broncos record, and he ranked third in the AFC with a 23.5-yd average. In 2002, missed the entire regular season after dislocating his wrist in the preseason. He returned in 2003 primarily on kick returns.

On April 7, 2004, Cole signed with the Oakland Raiders as a free agent, but did not make the team's regular-season roster. In 2005, Cole spent the offseason and preseason with the Jacksonville Jaguars, who released him on August 30, 2005.

In all, Cole played 35 games in the NFL, starting 2. He caught 12 passes for 164 yards, returned 89 kickoffs for a total of 2,105 yards, and made 17 tackles while playing on special teams.

In May 2006, Cole signed with the Canadian Football League's Edmonton Eskimos. He was released shortly thereafter, and in November he signed a one-year free agent contract with the Arena Football League's Los Angeles Avengers. On April 1, 2008, Cole signed with the CFL's Toronto Argonauts.

== Personal life ==
After football, he returned to Texas A&M University to pursue his degree in sociology. In March 2002, Cole's first child was born, Makenna Turner. She is currently a student at Stanford University, having won many awards as a black female in STEM.
