= Lutcher =

Lutcher can refer to:

== People ==
- Henry J. Lutcher, a sawmiller and business partner of the Lutcher and Moore Lumber Company
- Nellie Lutcher, an African-American jazz singer and pianist

== Places ==
- Lutcher, Louisiana, United States
