= Greg Hill (cornerback) =

American football player (born 1961)

No. 23, 36
- Position: Cornerback

Personal information
- Born: February 12, 1961 (age 65); Orange, Texas, U.S.
- Listed height: 6 ft 1 in (1.85 m)
- Listed weight: 194 lb (88 kg)

Career information
- High school: West Orange-Stark (West Orange, Texas)
- College: Oklahoma State
- NFL draft: 1983: 4th round, 86th overall pick

Career history
- Houston Oilers (1983); Kansas City Chiefs (1984–1987); St. Louis Cardinals (1987)*; Los Angeles Raiders (1987); Houston Oilers (1987); Kansas City Chiefs (1988)
- * Offseason or practice squad member only

Career NFL statistics
- Interceptions: 9
- Touchdowns: 1
- Stats at Pro Football Reference

Gregory Michael Hill (born February 12, 1961) is an American former professional football player who was a cornerback for six seasons in the National Football League (NFL). He played college football for the Oklahoma State Cowboys. He played in the NFL for the Houston Oilers, the Kansas City Chiefs, and the Los Angeles Raiders.
