= Edgar William Brown =

Edgar William Brown, Sr. (1859–1917) was a physician who turned from the medical practice to become one of the most successful businessmen in the southern United States. His business contributions would help fuel the industrial development of the city of Orange, Texas.

Edgar W. Brown was born in Ringgold, Georgia on November 22, 1859, to Dr. Samuel M. and Georgia (Malone) Brown. After the Civil War, his family moved several times before settling in Orange in 1871. He attended Tulane University at New Orleans and graduated in 1882 with honors. He immediately returned to Orange to begin his medical practice. On November 28, 1888 he married Carrie Launa Lutcher, the daughter of the lumber baron Henry J. Lutcher. In the late 1880s, under the influence of his wife’s family, Brown gave up his medical practice to devote full-time to work in the lumber business. His first twelve years in the lumber trade was spent supervising a sawmill in Donner, Louisiana. He would go on to become president of the Lutcher and Moore Cypress Lumber Company, and a partner in the Yellow Pine Paper Mill in which he shared interests with his brother-in-law William Henry Stark. During the time in which the Gulf Intracoastal Waterway was being developed, Brown along with his father-in-law and other key local businessmen would help influence the development of the deepwater channel link to the Port of Orange. Brown also partnered with W.H. Stark to begin the construction of an iron bridge to replace the ferry that crossed the Sabine River to provide another transportation link for Texas and Louisiana. Brown’s other influence on the region was the development of irrigation canals for rice farming and his financial investments in the local growing oil industry.

On June 16, 1917 Brown died of cancer and was buried in Evergreen Cemetery in Orange, Texas. A marker was built by the Texas Historical Commission to commemorate his business accomplishments.

== The Brown family legacy ==
His eldest son Edgar W. Brown, Jr., would also become a successful businessman in areas such as banking, shipbuilding, and financial projects. As a philanthropist, E.W. Brown, Jr. positively impacted the City of Orange. He gave his former residence on Green Avenue to the city of Orange for a city hall. Likewise, Lamar University at Orange has benefited from the Linden estate (now known as the Brown Estate) consisting of the mansion and its sixty-two acres that is used as an educational center.

His younger son Henry Lutcher Brown served as active Vice President of the Yellow Pine Paper Mill Company of Orange, Texas. This was the first mill in the world to make commercial paper from pine. Mr. Brown also had the distinction of being the youngest National Bank President in the United States in the mid-1920's. In 1924, Lutcher Brown opened the Brown Paper Company plant in West Monroe, Louisiana. Built at a cost of more than two million dollars at that time, it was designed by architect James Gamble Rogers of New York, who also designed the Harkness Memorial Quadrangle at Yale University. In 1935, Mr. Brown and his wife, Emily Wells Brown, moved to San Antonio, Texas, and built one of the most grand homes in the country. Known as Oak Court, the home was designed by Atlee B. Ayers and his son Robert Ayers, and located in the Terrell Hills neighborhood of San Antonio. The Brown family gave the home to the University of Texas System in 1965 for use as a conference center. UTSA operated the Lutcher Center, named in honor of Mr. Brown's grandfather Henry Jacob Lutcher, in the 1970s and 1980s until it was sold to private owners in 1988. The Lutcher Brown Endowment for Academic Excellence, created in 1983 through the sale of Oak Court, has long supported a broad range of activities at the University of Texas at San Antonio, and continues to fund several Distinguished Chairs. The Brown family were very active in San Antonio society and the arts, and their generosity was responsible for the opening in 1970 of the Emily Wells Brown Wing of the Marion Koogler McNay Art Museum, which had an auditorium, several offices, a sculpture pavilion, as well as a library.
