= Ross Elder =

American Test Pilot and Analog Astronaut

Ross Elder is a United States Air Force officer and experimental test pilot who, in 2025, was selected as mission commander for NASA's second Crew Health and Performance Exploration Analog (CHAPEA) mission, a 378-day Mars mission simulation conducted to inform planning for future human missions to Mars.

Elder's Air Force career has included service as an A-10 Thunderbolt II pilot, developmental test pilot, and instructor at the United States Air Force Test Pilot School. As a developmental test pilot, he participated in testing of the F-35 Lightning II and F-15EX Eagle II and in the Combat Artificial Intelligence Technology Demonstration (CAITD), which evaluated autonomous flight capabilities using the XQ-58A Valkyrie.

== Early life and education ==
Elder grew up in Williamstown, West Virginia, where he graduated from Williamstown High School. He attended the United States Air Force Academy, where he earned a Bachelor of Science degree in astronautical engineering.

He earned a Master of Science in mechanical engineering from the University of Colorado Colorado Springs before attending the United States Air Force Test Pilot School as a member of Class 20-B, where he earned a master's degree in flight test engineering.

== Military career ==
Elder was commissioned as an officer in the United States Air Force and served as an A-10 Thunderbolt II pilot flying combat missions in support of U.S. military operations. He was selected to attend the United States Air Force Test Pilot School at Edwards Air Force Base, graduating as a member of Class 20-B. He subsequently became a developmental test pilot, conducting flight testing of advanced military aircraft and weapons systems.

Elder's flight test work has included developmental testing of the F-35 Lightning II and F-15EX Eagle II, as well as participation in the Combat Artificial Intelligence Technology Demonstration (CAITD), which evaluated autonomous flight capabilities using the XQ-58A Valkyrie. He later served as developmental test lead for the Viper Experimentation and Next-generation Operations Model–Autonomy Flying Testbed (VENOM-AFT), an Air Force program that modified F-16 Fighting Falcons for autonomous flight testing.

He later served as Director of Operations for the 461st Flight Test Squadron before becoming an instructor at the United States Air Force Test Pilot School.

As of 2025, Elder has accumulated more than 1,800 flight hours, including approximately 200 combat hours, and had flown more than 35 military aircraft types.

== CHAPEA Mission 2 ==
In September 2025, NASA selected Ross Elder as mission commander of the second Crew Health and Performance Exploration Analog (CHAPEA) mission. On October 19, 2025, the crew entered Mars Dune Alpha, a 3D-printed habitat at NASA's Johnson Space Center in Houston, Texas, beginning a planned 378-day simulated Mars mission.

As commander, Elder leads a four-member crew conducting scientific research, simulated extravehicular activities (EVAs), robotic operations, habitat maintenance, and other operational tasks designed to support NASA's planning for future human missions to Mars.

== Awards and honors ==
In 2024, Elder was among the recipients of the American Institute of Aeronautics and Astronautics Aerospace Excellence Award as a member of the United States Air Force Combat Artificial Intelligence Technology Demonstration Team. The award recognized the team's demonstration of artificial intelligence-enabled autonomous flight using the XQ-58A Valkyrie.
