= West Orange High School =

West Orange High School may refer to:

- West Orange High School (Florida), located in Winter Garden, Florida
- West Orange High School (New Jersey), located in West Orange, New Jersey
- West Orange-Stark High School, located in West Orange, Texas; known as West Orange High School before 1977
