= Bridge City, Texas =

- City
- Interactive map of Bridge City, Texas
- Coordinates: 30°01′45″N 93°50′54″W
- Country: United States
- State: Texas
- County: Orange

Area
  - Total: 7.14 sq mi (18.50 km^{2})
  - Land: 6.44 sq mi (16.67 km^{2})
  - Water: 0.71 sq mi (1.83 km^{2})
- Elevation: 10 ft (3.0 m)

Population (2020)
  - Total: 9,546
  - Density: 1,221.3/sq mi (471.55/km^{2})
- Time zone: UTC-6 (Central (CST))
  - Summer (DST): UTC-5 (CDT)
- ZIP code: 77611
- Area code: 409
- FIPS code: 48-10252
- GNIS feature ID: 2409905
- Website: www.bridgecitytex.com

Bridge City is a city in Orange County, Texas, United States. It is 100 miles east of Houston, near the Gulf of Mexico. The population was 9,546 at the 2020 census. The town borders the Neches River and Cow Bayou. It is part of the Beaumont–Port Arthur Metropolitan Statistical Area. The area is mostly known for its association with the petroleum products (oil) industry.

== History ==
The city was originally named Prairie View, as it was located on the coastal grasslands of the upper Texas coastline. But in 1938, the Port Arthur-Orange Bridge (now known as the Rainbow Bridge) was built, and the unincorporated area took on the name "Bridge City". Despite several previous attempts, the city did not incorporate until 1970.

Bridge City got its name from the fact that one has to cross a bridge to enter the city. All three major roads that enter Bridge City—Chemical Road, SH 87, and F.M. 1442—cross a body of water. SH 87 crosses the Neches River and Cow Bayou—Cow Bayou on the Orange side and the Neches River on the Port Arthur side. Chemical Road crosses a branch off of the Sabine River and Cow Bayou. F.M. 1442 crosses a small creek off Cow Bayou between F.M. 105 and the Bridge City City limits. F.M. 1442 also crosses Cow Bayou just north of Orangefield and south of Interstate 10.

In 1990, Bridge City became the first city in Texas to install "leaning" streetlights because of the tall electrical lines near the roadway.

In 2008, the storm surge generated by Hurricane Ike caused nearly complete flooding of Bridge City. Mayor Kirk Roccaforte estimated that only 14 homes in the city were unaffected by the surge. The piles of debris and waterlogged furniture placed outside homes by residents beginning to clean up led the mayor to say "The whole city looks like a flea market."

== Geography and Climate ==
Climate data for Bridge City, Texas
Month	Jan	Feb	Mar	Apr	May	Jun	Jul	Aug	Sep	Oct	Nov	Dec	Year
Average precipitation inches (mm)	6.29 (160)	4.22 (107)	3.81 (97)	4.18 (106)	6.26 (159)	8.03 (204)	7.58 (193)	7.84 (199)	6.53 (166)	5.48 (139)	5.27 (134)	4.96 (126)	70.45 (1,790)
Source: https://www.ncei.noaa.gov/access/us-climate-normals/#dataset=normals-monthly&timeframe=30&station=US1TXOR0001

Climate: Located in a humid subtropical biome, Bridge City receives a high amount of annual rainfall, qualifying it as one of the wettest cities of the lower 48. Bridge City experiences very warm springs and hot summers along with high humidity, giving it more of a tropical feel for a majority of the year. Bridge City is prone to Tropical Cyclones and their flooding rains.

Geography: According to the United States Census Bureau, the city has a total area of 5.4 square miles (14 km^{2}), of which 5.1 square miles (13 km^{2}) is land and 0.2 square miles (0.52 km^{2}) (4.63%) is water.

== Natural disasters ==
Bridge City, in common with surrounding areas, has had a long history of hurricanes and tropical storms.

=== Hurricane Humberto (2007) ===
Widespread flooding occurred in Jefferson and Orange counties, and at least 20 homes in Beaumont were flooded from Hurricane Humberto. Additionally, several roadways were flooded. The passage of the hurricane caused one fatality in the state; a Bridge City man was killed when his carport crashed on him outside his house. The combination of saturated grounds and strong winds uprooted many trees and downed power lines across the path of the hurricane, with at least 50 high voltage transmission poles blown down or seriously damaged; over 120,000 power customers in Orange and Jefferson counties lost power, with 118,000 Entergy customers in the state without electricity. The National Weather Service estimated gusts exceeded 90 mph (140 km/h) in southwestern Jefferson County and extreme southeastern Chambers County.

=== Hurricane Ike (2008) ===
Bridge City, Texas was heavily damaged by Hurricane Ike on September 13, 2008. Damage was widespread and severe across Orange County. With over 95 percent of buildings and houses in Bridge City totally gutted, the city was nearly completely destroyed. The 22-foot (6.7 m) storm surge completely flooded the city and obliterated everything in its way. Storm surge breached the levee at the City of Orange, and traveled up the Neches River to flood Rose City. It took three days to drain the water from the city. The city government gutted the city hall due to the Ike damages. The first city council meeting after Ike was held there sometime recent before January 19, 2009. Of the 3,400 houses in Bridge City, 16 were still habitable immediately after Ike.

In the City of Orange, right next to Bridge City, nearly the entire city of 19,000 people was flooded, anywhere from 6 inches (15 cm) to 15 feet (4.6 m). The mayor of the city said about 375 people, of those who stayed behind during the storm, began to emerge, some needing food, water and medical care. Many dead fish littered streets and properties. Bridge City Mayor Kirk Roccaforte estimated that only 14 homes in the city were unaffected by the surge. Five of which were in the Oakview addition on Louise Street. The piles of debris and waterlogged furniture placed outside homes by residents beginning to clean up led the mayor to say "The whole city looks like a flea market." During the post-storm cleanup, Bridge City residents found swimming pools had been occupied by jellyfish brought inland with the water. Three people were found dead in Orange County on September 29.

=== Hurricane Harvey (2017) ===
Hurricane Harvey was a huge rainfall producer. On the night of August 30, 2017, Bridge City was absolutely inundated with floodwaters, causing widespread damage. The past twenty-four hours had seen over 20 inches of rainfall. By the time Harvey was working its way toward Southeast Texas, it was a slow-moving storm, meaning everywhere in Harvey's path would be drenched in rainfall for several days before Harvey moved on.

=== Hurricane Laura (2020) ===
When Hurricane Laura hit, there was mainly wind damage in Bridge City. Several trees, light poles and traffic lights down due to the violent winds that Hurricane Laura brought. A wind gust of 73 mph was recorded at Port Arthur near Bridge City. The Orange County Airport's weather station went out during the storm.

== Demographics ==
Historical population
Census	Pop.	Note	%±
1960	4,677		—
1970	8,164		74.6%
1980	7,667		−6.1%
1990	8,034		4.8%
2000	8,651		7.7%
2010	7,840		−9.4%
2020	9,546		21.8%
U.S. Decennial Census

=== 2020 census ===
As of the 2020 census, Bridge City had a population of 9,546 and a median age of 35.4 years. 26.7% of residents were under the age of 18 and 14.3% were 65 years of age or older. For every 100 females there were 97.8 males, and for every 100 females age 18 and over there were 94.6 males age 18 and over.

98.1% of residents lived in urban areas, while 1.9% lived in rural areas.

There were 3,565 households in Bridge City, of which 38.8% had children under the age of 18 living in them. Of all households, 54.6% were married-couple households, 16.9% were households with a male householder and no spouse or partner present, and 22.7% were households with a female householder and no spouse or partner present. About 22.1% of all households were made up of individuals and 8.8% had someone living alone who was 65 years of age or older.

There were 3,872 housing units, of which 7.9% were vacant. Among occupied housing units, 71.8% were owner-occupied and 28.2% were renter-occupied. The homeowner vacancy rate was 2.2% and the rental vacancy rate was 9.8%.

Racial composition as of the 2020 census (Note: Note: the U.S. Census treats Hispanic or Latino as an ethnic category; Hispanics/Latinos can be of any race.)
Race	Percent
White	84.0%
Black or African American	1.0%
American Indian and Alaska Native	0.6%
Asian	2.8%
Native Hawaiian and Other Pacific Islander	<0.1%
Some other race	4.1%
Two or more races	7.4%
Hispanic or Latino (of any race)	10.9%

=== 2000 census ===
As of the 2000 census, there were 8,651 people, 3,195 households, and 2,476 families residing in the city. The population density was 1,682.0 people per square mile (649.4 people/km^{2}). There were 3,432 housing units at an average density of 667.3 per square mile (257.6/km^{2}). The racial makeup of the city was 95.43% White, 0.20% Black or African American, 0.75% Native American, 1.40% Asian, 0.06% Pacific Islander, 1.27% from other races, and 0.89% from two or more races. 3.57% of the population were Hispanic or Latino of any race.

There were 3,195 households, out of which 36.7% had children under the age of 18 living with them, 62.0% were married couples living together, 10.6% had a female householder with no husband present, and 22.5% were non-families. 19.6% of all households were made up of individuals, and 8.8% had someone living alone who was 65 years of age or older. The average household size was 2.69 and the average family size was 3.07.

In the city, the population was spread out, with 27.0% under the age of 18, 9.5% from 18 to 24, 28.2% from 25 to 44, 23.1% from 45 to 64, and 12.3% who were 65 years of age or older. The median age was 36 years. For every 100 females, there were 96.4 males. For every 100 females age 18 and over, there were 93.5 males.

The median income for a household in the city was $42,045, and the median income for a family was $49,750. Males had a median income of $42,398 versus $22,674 for females. The per capita income for the city was $18,290. About 7.9% of families and 10.3% of the population were below the poverty line, including 13.1% of those under age 18 and 12.8% of those age 65 or over.

Bridge City was the only city in Orange County to have a growth in population according to the 1990 census.

== Education ==
Bridge City is served by the Bridge City Independent School District.

== Notable people ==
- Matt Bryant, NFL kicker, chiefly with Atlanta Falcons
- Randall "Tex" Cobb, prizefighter and actor
- Shane Dronett, NFL defensive lineman Denver Broncos and Falcons
- Jason Matthews, NFL tackle Indianapolis Colts and Tennessee Titans
- Steve Worster, University of Texas at Austin football player
