= Shane Dronett =

American football player (1971–2009)

No. 99, 94, 92, 75
- Position: Defensive lineman

Personal information
- Born: January 12, 1971; Orange, Texas, U.S.
- Died: January 21, 2009 (aged 38); Duluth, Georgia, U.S.
- Listed height: 6 ft 6 in (1.98 m)
- Listed weight: 300 lb (136 kg)

Career information
- High school: Bridge City (Bridge City, Texas)
- College: Texas
- NFL draft: 1992: 2nd round, 54th overall pick

Career history
- Denver Broncos (1992–1995); Atlanta Falcons (1996); Detroit Lions (1996); Atlanta Falcons (1997–2002)

Awards and highlights
- First-team All-American (1991); 2× First-team All-SWC (1990, 1991)

Career NFL statistics
- Tackles: 316
- Sacks: 44
- Interceptions: 3
- Stats at Pro Football Reference

Shane Dronett (January 12, 1971 – January 21, 2009) was an American professional football player who was a defensive lineman in the National Football League (NFL) for the Denver Broncos, Detroit Lions and Atlanta Falcons between 1992 and 2002. He was a starter for the Falcons in Super Bowl XXXIII. Before playing in the NFL he was an All-American college football player for the Texas Longhorns. He took his own life in 2009, an outcome that may have been related to chronic traumatic encephalopathy that resulted from his football career.

== Early life ==
Shane Dronett was born in Orange, Texas, and graduated from Bridge City High School in Bridge City, Texas in 1989.

He attended the University of Texas at Austin on a football scholarship. He made the All-Southwest Conference team in 1990 and in 1991 he was a semi-finalist for the Lombardi Award. He was a 3rd team AP All-American and a UPI All-American Team Honorable mention in 1990 and was a 1st Team All-American in 1991. During the 1991 season he recovered a fumble that set up Texas' first score against Texas Tech and blocked an extra point by then-NCAA career points leader Roman Anderson breaking his streak of 136 straight made. He also blocked three other kicks that season.

== Professional career ==
In the 1992 NFL draft, the Denver Broncos selected Dronett in the second round. He remained with the Broncos for four seasons, playing all 16 games in his first year. He played defensive end during his first three seasons. He became a free agent at the end of the 1994 season and re-signed with the Broncos, and played defensive tackle for the 1995 season.

Dronett became a free agent at the end of the 1995 season and signed a 2-year contract with the Atlanta Falcons. After 5 games, he was released by the Falcons and signed two-days later with the Detroit Lions. In 1996 he played, as a defensive end, 12 games total (5 for the Falcons, 7 for the Lions.) He became a free agent at the end of the 1996 season and re-signed with the Lions, but was released prior to the 1997 season.

Three days after being released by the Lions he was signed by the Falcons, who had just hired as their new head coach Dan Reeves, who had originally drafted Dronett to play for the Broncos. Dronett returned to playing defensive tackle and played a significant role in the Falcons' defense which ranked second in the NFL against the run, allowing only 75.2 rushing yards per game, and produced 313 tackles, 29.5 sacks, and 13 forced fumbles (11 recovered). When the Falcons won the NFC Championship in 1998, Dronett played in Super Bowl XXXIII against the Denver Broncos. In that game he recorded 7 tackles.

In January 2000, Dronett signed a five-year contract worth 20 million. In September, while playing with a partially torn ACL, Dronett suffered a season-ending complete torn ACL when sacking Carolina Panthers quarterback Steve Beuerlein. After sustaining the injury, Dronett returned one series later and finished the game with four tackles.

'"I felt like I tore something when it happened because I felt it pop and -- just the pain," he said. "On the sideline, they did the little test and said it seemed pretty stable. I said, 'Put the knee brace back on, and I’ll go back in the game.'"

— Shane Dronett (September 2000),

Dronett suffered several other injuries, including knee and shoulder problems, over the next two seasons that limited his ability to play. He was released by the Falcons after the 2002 season.

== Death ==
After his playing career, Dronett began to exhibit paranoia, confusion, fear, and rage. According to his family, Dronett's behavior changed radically. He was diagnosed with a benign brain tumor in 2007. Its removal did not alleviate Dronett's symptoms.

Dronett confronted his wife with a gun on January 21, 2009. As she ran for safety, he turned the gun on himself. His death was ruled a suicide by the Gwinnett County Medical Examiner's office.

After his death, Dronett's brain was tested at Boston University School of Medicine's Center for the Study of Traumatic Encephalopathy. Scientists determined that Dronett suffered from chronic traumatic encephalopathy, a brain disease associated with repeated head trauma. He was one of at least 345 NFL players to be diagnosed after death with this disease. According to the co-director of the center, Dr. Robert Stern, linemen are estimated to hit their heads about 1,000 times in each season they play. While those hits may not result in concussions, the repetitive lesser brain injuries are likely associated with the disease.

He left a wife, Chris, and two daughters, Berkley and Hayley.
