= Danny Klam =

Danny Klam is an entrepreneur and owns multiple businesses in Houston. He was named the Doughnut King of Texas

== Biography ==
Danny Klam was born in Orange, Texas, on July 1, 1981, and raised in Houston, Texas. He is the oldest of three children. He is the son of Kemdy and Linda Klam. Klam attended Gregory-Lincoln Education Center and Lamar High School (Houston, Texas) before he enrolled at the University of Houston. He worked as a car salesman for Toyota, after taking some time off from school.

While at the University of Houston, Klam double majored in Entrepreneurship and Marketing in the Bauer College of Business. He started a $1000 annual scholarship at the Bauer College before he graduated in May 2009.

== Career ==
Klam joined Simply Splendid Donuts & Ice Cream in 2007 as an Executive in Business Development. In 2009, Inc. magazine named him one of nine of the Coolest College Start-ups for his work with Simply Splendid. Klam acquired Chef Huang’s Chinese Take-Out located in near the Uptown District area of Houston in 2009. Klam left Chef Huang's a few months later, and relocated to Atlanta, Georgia. He now lives in Plano, Texas.
