= Matt Bryant =

American football player (born 1975)

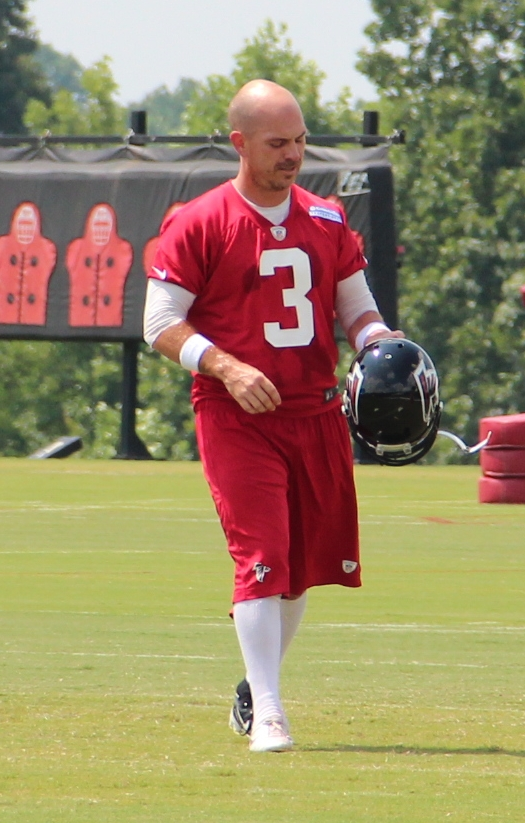
- Bryant with the Atlanta Falcons in 2013

No. 8, 5, 1, 3
- Position: Kicker

Personal information
- Born: May 29, 1975 (age 51); Orange, Texas, U.S.
- Listed height: 5 ft 9 in (1.75 m)
- Listed weight: 203 lb (92 kg)

Career information
- High school: Bridge City (Bridge City, Texas)
- College: Baylor
- NFL draft: 1999: undrafted

Career history
- Iowa Barnstormers (2000)*; New York Giants (2002–2003); → Berlin Thunder (2002); → Frankfurt Galaxy (2002); Dallas Cowboys (2004)*; Indianapolis Colts (2004); Miami Dolphins (2004); Tampa Bay Buccaneers (2005–2008); Florida Tuskers (2009); Atlanta Falcons (2009–2019)
- * Offseason or practice squad member only

Awards and highlights
- Pro Bowl (2016); NFL scoring leader (2016); George Halas Award (2009); PFWA All-Rookie Team (2002)

Career NFL statistics
- Field goals made: 397
- Field goals attempted: 464
- Field goal %: 85.6
- Longest field goal: 62
- Stats at Pro Football Reference

Steven Matt Bryant (born May 29, 1975), nicknamed "Money Matt", is an American former professional football player who was a kicker in the National Football League (NFL). He played college football for the Baylor Bears, and was signed as an unrestricted free agent by the AFL's Iowa Barnstormers in 2000. A Pro Bowler with the Atlanta Falcons in 2016, he was also a member of the New York Giants, Frankfurt Galaxy, Indianapolis Colts, Miami Dolphins, Tampa Bay Buccaneers, and Florida Tuskers.

== Early life ==
Bryant was born in Orange, Texas. He played football and baseball at Bridge City High School in Bridge City, Texas, and holds the school record for the longest field goal at 52 yards.

== College career ==
After graduating from high school, Bryant attended Trinity Valley Community College in Athens, Texas, where he was two-time NJCAA All-American and a member of the 1994 national championship team. He then signed with Oregon State University and later transferred to Baylor University, where he played in the 1997 and 1998 seasons and ranks seventh in the all-time scoring list with 105 points (21 field goals and 42 extra points). Bryant's 21 field goals place him fifth in Bears history. He set the school record with a 100 percent success rate when he made 42-of-42 extra points. After graduating from Baylor, Bryant went undrafted and worked at a pawn shop, then as a personal trainer. He was named to the 1990s Baylor All-Decade Team following his collegiate career.

== Professional career ==
Pre-draft measurables
Height	Weight
5 ft 8 1/2 in (1.74 m)	192 lb (87 kg)
Values from Pro Day

=== Iowa Barnstormers ===
After not being selected in the 1999 NFL draft, Bryant signed with Iowa Barnstormers of the Arena Football League on November 17, 1999, after the 1999 season, but he was cut on April 4, 2000, before the regular season began.

=== New York Giants ===
On January 9, 2002, Bryant signed with the NFL's New York Giants, who allocated him to the NFL Europe's Berlin Thunder on March 15. On March 30, the Thunder placed Bryant on injured reserve, and the Thunder cut Bryant on May 10. The Giants then reassigned Bryant to the Frankfurt Galaxy. Bryant never played for either NFL Europe team due to a quadriceps injury.

==== 2002 season ====
On September 5, he made his NFL debut against the San Francisco 49ers. He converted two field goal attempts and one extra point attempt in the 16–13 loss. In Week 3, against the Seattle Seahawks, Bryant was named NFC Special Teams Player of the Week. In the 9–6 victory, he was responsible for all of the Giants' points on three field goals. In Week 11, against the Washington Redskins, Bryant earned another NFC Special Teams Player of the Week award by converting four field goals and an extra point in the 19–17 victory. In Week 17, he had a 39-yard game-winning field goal in overtime of the 10–7 victory over the Philadelphia Eagles. He converted 30-of-32 extra point attempts and 26-of-32 field goal attempts in his rookie season. He made his playoff debut in the Giants' 39–38 loss to the San Francisco 49ers in the Wild Card Round. In the game, he converted five extra points and one of two field goal attempts.

==== 2003 season ====
In the 2003 season, Bryant appeared in the first four games before suffering a hamstring injury. During that stretch, he converted an overtime game-winning field goal against the Washington Redskins in Week 3. He returned to the team in Week 11 against the Philadelphia Eagles. Overall, he appeared in 11 games and converted all 17 extra point attempts and made 11-of-14 field goal attempts.

==== 2004 season ====
On July 30, 2004, Bryant was cut by new coach Tom Coughlin.

=== Dallas Cowboys ===
Bryant signed with the Dallas Cowboys on August 17, 2004, and was cut on September 5, 2004.

=== Indianapolis Colts and Miami Dolphins ===
He later played one week with the Indianapolis Colts and then three weeks with the Miami Dolphins. On the season, he converted all 12 extra point attempts and three field goals on four attempts.

=== Tampa Bay Buccaneers ===
==== 2005 season ====
Bryant was signed as a free agent by the Tampa Bay Buccaneers prior to the 2005 season. In Week 16, against the Atlanta Falcons, he had a game-winning 41-yard field goal in overtime of the 27–24 victory. In the 2005 season, he appeared in 14 games and converted all 31 extra point attempts and 21-of-25 field goal attempts. Bryant and the Buccaneers made the playoffs where they were eliminated by the Washington Redskins in the Wild Card Round by a score of 17–10.

==== 2006 season ====
On October 22, in Week 7, Bryant successfully converted a 62-yard field goal as time expired in Tampa Bay's 23–21 victory over the Philadelphia Eagles. In addition to the 62-yarder, he converted two other field goals and two extra points and earned his third career NFC Special Teams Player of the Week nomination. The game-winning field goal was the second longest in NFL history at the time, behind the 63-yard field goals kicked by Tom Dempsey in 1970 and Jason Elam in 1998. On October 23, in response to his 62-yard field goal, Mayor Pam Iorio declared October 23 to be "Matt Bryant Day" in Tampa, Florida. In the 2006 season, Bryant appeared in all 16 games of the Buccaneers' 4–12 season. On the season, he converted 22-of-23 extra point attempts and 17-of-22 field goal attempts.

==== 2007 season ====
In the 2007 season, Bryant appeared in all 16 games of the Buccaneers' 9–7 season and one playoff game. In Week 6, against the Tennessee Titans, he converted a game-winning 43-yard field goal with 11 seconds remaining in the 13–10 victory. On the season, he converted all 34 extra point attempts and 28-of-33 field goal attempts. In the Wild Card Round against the New York Giants, Bryant converted both extra point attempts in the 24–14 loss.

==== 2008 season ====
In the 2008 season, Bryant appeared in all 16 games of the Buccaneers' 9–7 season. In Week 3, against the Chicago Bears, he had a game-winning 21-yard field goal in overtime of the 27–24 victory. In Week 4, against the Green Bay Packers, Bryant earned his fourth career NFC Special Teams Player of the Week nomination. In the 30–21 victory, he converted three field goal attempts and three extra point attempts. On the season, he converted 35-of-36 extra point attempts and 32-of-38 field goal attempts. For the first time in his NFL career, he finished in the top five players in total scoring, landing in fourth place with 131 points.

On September 5, 2009, the Buccaneers released Bryant and replaced him with Mike Nugent.

=== Florida Tuskers ===
Prior to the start of the 2009 season, the Florida Tuskers of the United Football League signed Bryant to a contract.

=== Atlanta Falcons ===
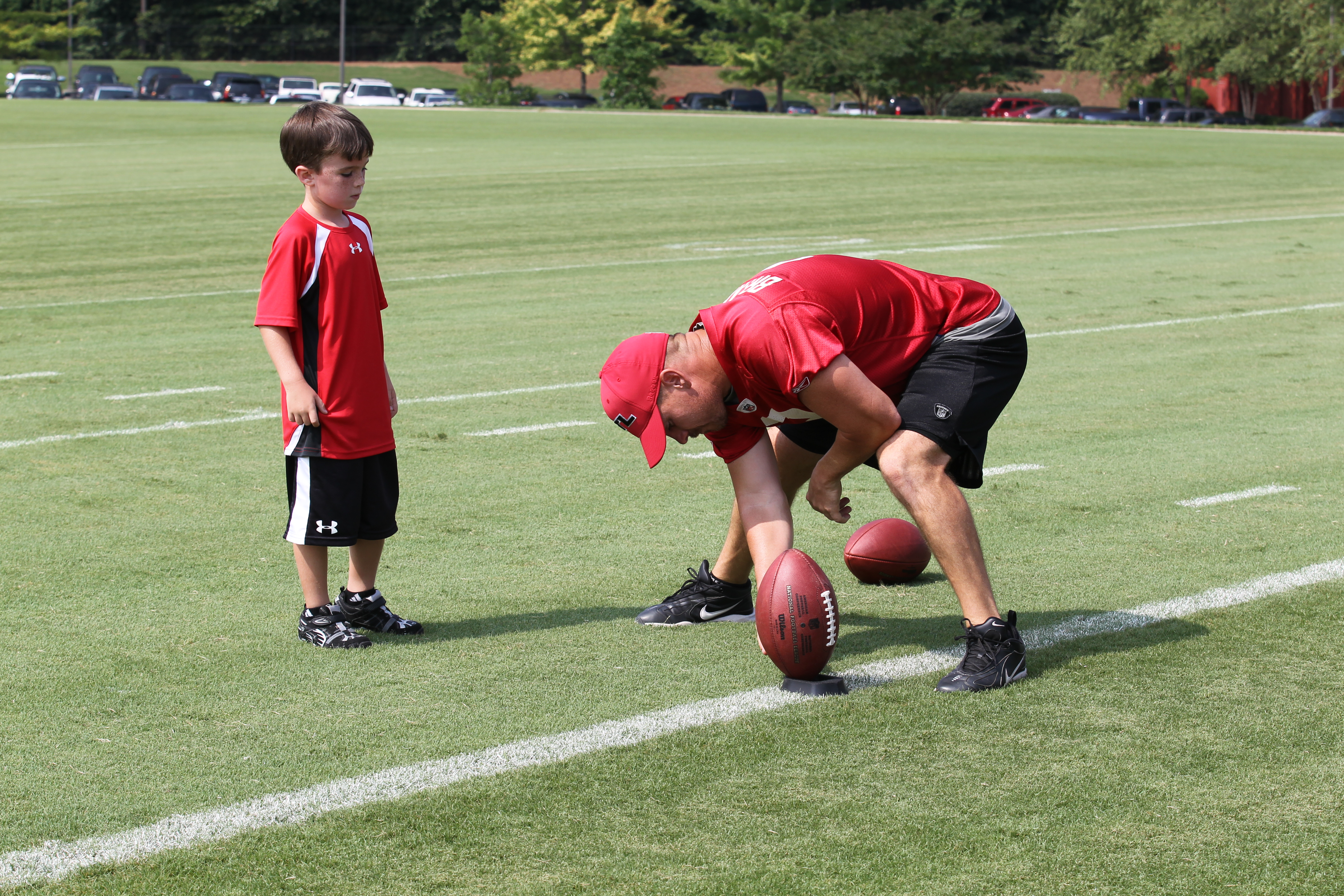
Bryant in 2010 (right)

==== 2009 season ====
Bryant was signed by the Atlanta Falcons on December 1, 2009, to replace veteran Jason Elam. He appeared in five games of the Falcons' 9–7 season. In Week 14, against the New Orleans Saints, he had his best scoring performance of the season. In the 26–23 loss, he converted all three field goal attempts and both extra point attempts. On the season, he converted all 10 extra point attempts and 7-of-10 field goal attempts.

==== 2010 season ====
In the 2010 season, Bryant appeared in all 16 games of the Falcons' 13–3 season and one playoff game. In Week 4, against the San Francisco 49ers, Bryant earned his fifth career NFC Special Teams Player of the Week nomination. In the 16–14 victory, he converted three field goal attempts and one extra point attempt. The last of the three field goals was a go-ahead 43-yard attempt that left only two seconds remaining. In Week 12, against the Green Bay Packers, Bryant converted a go-ahead 47-yard field goal with only nine seconds remaining in the 20–17 victory. On the season, he converted all 44 extra point attempts and 28-of-31 field goal attempts. For the second time in his career, he finished in the top five players in scoring with 128 points scored. In the Divisional Round of the playoffs, Bryant converted all three extra points in the 48–21 loss to the Green Bay Packers.

==== 2011 season ====
In the 2011 season, Bryant appeared in all 16 games of the Falcons' 10–6 season. In Week 4, against the Seattle Seahawks, he had his best scoring performance of the season. He converted all three field goal attempts and all three extra point attempts in the 30–28 victory. On the season, he converted all 45 extra point attempts and 27-of-29 field goal attempts.

==== 2012 season ====
In the 2012 season, Bryant appeared in all 16 games of the Falcons' 13–3 season and two playoff games. In the season opener against the Kansas City Chiefs, he converted all four field goal attempts and all four extra point attempts in the 40–24 victory. In Week 4, against the Carolina Panthers, he converted a game-winning 40-yard field goal with five seconds remaining to win 30–28. In Week 6, against the Oakland Raiders, he converted a game-winning 55-yard field goal with one second remaining to help the Falcons win 23–20. On the season, he converted all 44 extra point attempts and 33-of-38 field goal attempts. He finished a then career-best third in the league in scoring with 143 points scored. In the Divisional Round against the Seattle Seahawks, Bryant kicked a game-winning 49-yard field goal to send the Falcons to the NFC Championship Game with a 30–28 victory. In the NFC Championship, he converted three extra point attempts and one field goal attempt as the Falcons fell 28–24 to the San Francisco 49ers.

==== 2013 season ====
In the 2013 season, Bryant appeared in all 16 games of the Falcons' 4–12 season. One highlight in the season for Bryant was in Week 13 against the Buffalo Bills. He converted a 36-yard game winning field goal in overtime of the 34–31 victory. On the season, he converted all 39 extra point attempts and 24-of-27 field goal attempts.

==== 2014 season ====
In the 2014 season, Bryant appeared in all 16 games of the Falcons' 6–10 season.

On September 7, 2014, in the season opener, Bryant became the fourth player in NFL history to kick a 50+yard field goal with less than a minute remaining in regulation to force overtime in addition to converting a 50+ game-winning field goal in a 37–34 overtime victory against the New Orleans Saints at the Georgia Dome. In recognition of his performance, he was named as the NFC Special Teams Player of the Week for the sixth time in his career. On September 18, in a 56–14 victory over the Tampa Bay Buccaneers on Thursday Night Football, he converted a career-high eight extra points on eight attempts in Week 3. On November 9, in the other divisional game against the Buccaneers in Week 10, Bryant was four-for-four on field goals. He also made two extra points which pushed him over the 600 point mark (601), making him the second player in Atlanta Falcon history to reach 600 points. On November 16, in Week 11 against the Carolina Panthers, Bryant was four-of-four on field goals again. This marked the tenth time in his career that he made four field goals in a single game. On November 30, against the Arizona Cardinals, Bryant connected on a career-high five field goals on five attempts in Week 13. Along with two extra points in the game, he had a career-high 17 points scored.

On the season, he converted all 40 extra point attempts and 29-of-32 field goal attempts. In recognition of his successful 2014 season, Bryant was named to Pro Football Focus's First-team.

==== 2015 season ====
In the offseason, the Falcons signed Bryant to a three-year contract extension.

In the 2015 season, Bryant appeared in 10 games of the Falcons' 8–8 season.

On September 14, 2015, Bryant kicked a game-winning 47-yard field goal in the season opener against the Philadelphia Eagles on Monday Night Football. He was responsible for 14 total points scored in the 26–24 win.

On October 11, 2015, in Week 5, Bryant only connected on two of his four field goal attempts against the Washington Redskins. His streak of 28 straight made field goals was the second-longest in team history behind his stretch of 30 consecutive field goals between 2010 and 2011. In addition, his streak of consecutive field goals made inside 50 yards ended at 46 straight.

On October 15, 2015, in Week 6, Bryant connected on all three of his extra point attempts against the New Orleans Saints, becoming the second player in franchise history to eclipse 700-career points joining kicker Morten Andersen (806).

On December 11, 2015, Bryant was placed on injured reserve with a quad injury. The Falcons signed Shayne Graham to finish up the season in place of Bryant.

On the season, he appeared in ten games and converted all 26 extra point attempts and 14-of-18 field goal attempts.

==== 2016 season ====
In the 2016 season, Bryant appeared in all 16 games of the Falcons' 11–5 season and all three playoff games.

In Week 8, against the Green Bay Packers, he converted three extra point attempts and two field goal attempts in the 33–32 victory. In the game, he passed Morten Andersen for the franchise record for career points scored with his 807th point scored.

Bryant was named NFC Special Teams Player of the Month for October after converting 11-of-12 field goals and all 17 extra points.

In Week 16, in the 33–16 victory over the Carolina Panthers on Christmas Eve, he converted four of five field goal attempts and three extra point attempts. For the seventh time in his NFL career, he was named as the NFC Special Teams Player of the Week.

On the season, he converted 56-of-57 extra point attempts and 34-of-37 field goal attempts. In all, he was responsible for a career-high and league-high 158 points scored for the Falcons in 2016. It was the first time in Bryant's career that he won the scoring title.

In the Divisional Round of the playoffs against the Seattle Seahawks, he converted all four extra point attempts and both field goal attempts in the 36–20 victory.

In the NFC Championship, in the final NFL game at the Georgia Dome, he converted five of six extra point attempts and one field goal attempt in the 44–21 victory over the Green Bay Packers.

Bryant appeared in his first career Super Bowl in Super Bowl LI against the New England Patriots. He became the third-oldest player in NFL history to appear in a Super Bowl, behind Matt Stover and Jeff Feagles. Late in the fourth quarter of the game, the Patriots trailed 28–20 and the Falcons had the ball on the New England 23-yard line. Well-within Bryant's field goal range, quarterback Matt Ryan took a 12-yard sack, and they lost 10 more yards on the next play due to a holding penalty from offensive lineman Jake Matthews. The drawbacks forced the Falcons to punt and prevented Bryant from potentially putting the Falcons up two possessions late in the fourth quarter. The Falcons went on to lose 34–28 in overtime. Bryant converted all four of his extra point attempts in the Super Bowl.

In recognition of his successful season, Bryant earned a Pro Bowl nomination for the first time in his career and Pro Football Focus named him to their Second-team.

==== 2017 season ====
In Week 2, in the 34–23 victory over the Green Bay Packers, Bryant recorded a 51-yard field goal in the second quarter for the first field goal in the history of the new Mercedes-Benz Stadium. In the game, he converted all four extra point attempts and both field goal attempts. In the same game, Bryant became the first player in franchise history to convert 200 field goals. In Week 14, in the 20–17 victory over the New Orleans Saints, Bryant scored his 1,000th career point, becoming the first player in franchise history to reach the mark. In Week 17, Bryant went 5-for-5 on field goals, including a 56-yarder, in a 22–10 win over the Carolina Panthers, clinching a playoff spot for the Falcons, earning him NFC Special Teams Player of the Week. In the 2017 season, Bryant converted all 35 extra point attempts and 34 of 39 field goal attempts.

In the Wild Card Round of the playoffs, Bryant converted all four field goal attempts and both extra point attempts in the 26–13 victory over the Los Angeles Rams.

==== 2018 season ====
On March 5, 2018, Bryant signed a three-year contract extension with the Falcons through the 2020 season. In the season opener against the Philadelphia Eagles on Thursday Night Football, Bryant missed his first extra point attempt on the season but converted two field goals in the 18–12 loss. In the next five games, he converted all 16 extra point attempts and all seven field goal attempts. In the Week 6 against the Tampa Bay Buccaneers, he suffered a hamstring injury after converting a 57-yard field goal to help seal the game. He was forced to sit out the next week's game against the New York Giants. He finished the 2018 season converting 33 of 35 extra point attempts and 20 of 21 field goal attempts.

On February 6, 2019, Bryant was released by the Falcons after ten seasons.

==== 2019 season ====
On August 31, 2019, Bryant re-signed with the Falcons on a one-year, $3 million deal following preseason struggles by Giorgio Tavecchio and Blair Walsh. However, he struggled with being consistent during the first eight weeks of the season. After missing two field goals in Week 8 against the Seattle Seahawks, the Falcons cut Bryant on October 29, 2019, and signed Younghoe Koo to replace him. He finished the 2019 season converting 14 of 15 extra point attempts and nine of 14 field goal attempts.

== Career statistics ==
Legend
**Bold**	Career high

=== NFL ===
Year	Team	GP	Field goals				Extra points			Points
Year	Team	GP	FGA	FGM	Lng	Pct	XPA	XPM	Pct	Points
2002	NYG	16	32	26	47	81.3	32	30	93.8	108
2003	NYG	11	14	11	47	78.6	17	17	**100.0**	50
2004	IND	1	1	—	—	0.0	5	5	**100.0**	5
2004	MIA	3	3	3	47	**100.0**	7	7	**100.0**	16
2005	TB	15	25	21	50	84.0	31	31	**100.0**	94
2006	TB	16	22	17	**62**	77.3	23	22	95.7	73
2007	TB	16	33	28	49	84.8	34	34	**100.0**	118
2008	TB	16	38	32	49	84.2	36	35	97.2	131
2009	ATL	5	10	7	51	70.0	10	10	**100.0**	31
2010	ATL	16	31	28	51	90.3	44	44	**100.0**	128
2011	ATL	16	29	27	51	93.1	45	45	**100.0**	126
2012	ATL	16	38	33	55	86.8	44	44	**100.0**	143
2013	ATL	16	27	24	53	88.9	39	39	**100.0**	111
2014	ATL	16	32	29	54	90.6	40	40	**100.0**	127
2015	ATL	10	18	14	47	77.8	26	26	**100.0**	68
2016	ATL	16	37	**34**	59	91.9	**57**	**56**	98.2	**158**
2017	ATL	16	**39**	**34**	57	87.1	35	35	**100.0**	137
2018	ATL	13	21	20	57	95.2	35	33	94.3	93
2019	ATL	7	14	9	52	64.3	15	14	93.3	41
Total		241	464	397	62	85.6	575	567	98.6	1,758

=== College ===
Season	Team	GP	Kicking						Pts
Season	Team	GP	XPM	XPA	XP%	FGM	FGA	FG%	Pts
1997	Baylor	11	**23**	**23**	**100.0**	9	14	64.3	50
1998	Baylor	11	19	19	**100.0**	**12**	**15**	**80.0**	**55**
Career		22	42	42	100.0	21	29	72.4	105

== Career highlights ==
=== Awards and honors ===
- Pro Bowl (2016)
- NFL scoring leader (2016)
- George Halas Award (2009)
- PFWA All-Rookie Team (2002)

=== Atlanta Falcons franchise records ===
- Most points scored, career: 1,168
- Most points scored, single season: 158
- Most extra points made and attempted, season: 56 and 57
- Most extra points made and attempted, single career: 386 and 390
- Most field goals made and attempted, career: 259 and 296

== Personal life ==
Bryant participated in 2002 United Way Hometown Huddle by conducting a football clinic at the Highbridge Center for members of Alianza Dominicana, a local United Way agency that services families in Washington Heights. He visited the Keller Army Community Hospital at West Point to participate in the Foundation for Hospital Art's Paintfest 2003.

Bryant drinks a chocolate milkshake on the night before each of his football games. He also is known for squeezing his size 10.5 foot into a size 9 kicking shoe for games, believing that curling his foot to strike the ball in the same way that someone makes a fist with his hand before punching increases his distance and accuracy.

Matt is married to Melissa. The couple has seven children and they reside in Orange Beach, Alabama. On September 24, 2008, their youngest son Tryson died in his sleep, age three months, apparently from sudden infant death syndrome (SIDS). Despite that tragedy, a day after his son's funeral, he returned to play and kicked three field goals for the team to beat the Green Bay Packers, having kicked the game-winning field goal the week before against Chicago Bears in overtime. After the season, Matt and Melissa established the Matthew Tryson Bryant Foundation to raise awareness for SIDS. Proceeds go to the March of Dimes.

In 2009, Bryant was inducted into the Museum of the Gulf Coast, in the museum's Sports Hall of Fame.

In the 2015 offseason, Bryant gave some time to families from TAPS (Tragedy Assistance Program for Survivors), a national non-profit that provides care for families that have lost loved ones that served in the armed forces. He gave them a tour of downtown Atlanta and hosted them to dinner.
