= Jason Ballard (entrepreneur) =

American housing entrepeneur

- Born: 1981 or 1982 (age 44–45); Bridge City, Texas
- Education: Texas A&M University (BS)
- Occupation: Entrepeneur

Jason Ballard is an American housing entrepeneur based in Texas. He is best known for his role as co-founder and CEO of Icon 3D, a construction technology company focused on 3D-printing houses. In this role, he helped create the world's first 3D-printed community, Wolf Ranch. He previously founded eco-friendly home store Treehouse. He was named to the Time 100 Next in 2021.

== Biography ==
Ballard grew up in Bridge City, Texas and Orange, Texas to a community which frequently evacuated from hurricanes, and once spent Christmas at a FEMA trailer. His community also was filled with petrochemical plants. He was at first interested in becoming an Episcopal minister, and entered the discernment process after highschool. He went on, however, to earn a bachelor's degree in conservation biology from Texas A&M University and earn a master's degree in space resources, as well as become an apprentice in carpentry. He ultimately decided, however, to focus on housing.

In 2011, he created home improvements store Treehouse, which was based in Austin, Texas. It included products focused on sustainability and affordability. He led it to acquire $35,000,000 in investments and open two more stores.

However, he ultimately decided to shift to creating 3D-printed houses, and co-founded house-printing company Icon 3D. Their first attempt, revealed during South by Southwest, resulted in a successful house, but was misreported as being lower-cost than it was. This helped increase demand. Another project he created early on was a partnership with a local housing development focused on supporting the homeless.

He led the company to create the world's first 3D-printed community, Wolf Ranch, outside of Georgetown, Texas. He has also printed and houses outside of the US in Nacajuca. Ballard led Icon 3D to partner with NASA to print a simulation of a Martian building at the Johnson Space Center. He has also printed U.S. army bases, which he stated was "making more history". He has emphasized the ease of creating "additional flourishes" in these buildings.

As part of ICON 3D, he also launched artificial intelligence tool Vitruvius.

He was named to the Time 100 Next in 2021. This profile was written by Danish architect Bjarke Ingels.
