= Pat Gibbs =

Football player (born 1950)

No. 45
- Positions: Defensive back, Kick returner

Personal information
- Born: April 5, 1950 (age 76); Marshall, Texas, U.S.
- Listed height: 5 ft 10 in (1.78 m)
- Listed weight: 188 lb (85 kg)

Career information
- High school: Lutcher Stark (TX)
- College: Lamar
- NFL draft: 1972: 9th round, 222nd overall pick

Career history
- Philadelphia Eagles (1972); Philadelphia Eagles (1973)*; Shreveport Steamer (1974-1975); New Orleans Saints (1976)*
- * Offseason or practice squad member only
- Stats at Pro Football Reference

Patrick Henry Gibbs (born April 5, 1950) is an American former professional football defensive back who played for the Philadelphia Eagles of the National Football League (NFL).

Gibbs played college football at Lamar University, where he also played wide receiver. He was drafted 222nd overall by the Eagles in the ninth round of the 1972 NFL draft with the 222nd overall selection. He made the Eagles for the 1972 regular season and played in their first two games, primarily as a kick returner. Against the Dallas Cowboys on September 17 he returned two kickoffs for 44 yards. In his second game against the Cleveland Browns on September 24 he returned one kickoff for 17 yards and one punt for 8 yards. In the second half of that game while attempting to field a kickoff he suffered a torn medial collateral ligament in his knee that required surgery and he had to miss the rest of the season. The Eagles waived him during the 1973 preseason. He joined the Houston Texans of the World Football League (WFL) (who relocated during the season to Shreveport, Louisiana to play as the Shreveport Steamer) for the 1974 season. He finished the season tied for 4th in the league with 8 interceptions. He also returned punts for the Texans/Steamer. He was suspended by the Steamer before their 1975 season began after he left camp without permission after losing his starting job. He signed with the New Orleans Saints for the 1976 NFL season but was cut during the preseason.
