= Jason Mathews =

American football player (born 1971)

No. 74, 67, 76
- Position: Offensive tackle

Personal information
- Born: February 9, 1971 (age 55); Orange, Texas, U.S.
- Listed height: 6 ft 5 in (1.96 m)
- Listed weight: 285 lb (129 kg)

Career information
- High school: Bridge City (Bridge City, Texas)
- College: Texas A&M / Brigham Young
- NFL draft: 1994: 3rd round, 67th overall pick

Career history
- Indianapolis Colts (1994–1997); Tampa Bay Buccaneers (1998)*; Tennessee Oilers/Titans (1998–2004)
- * Offseason or practice squad member only

Awards and highlights
- First-team All-SWC (1993)

Career NFL statistics
- Games played: 142
- Games started: 43
- Fumble recoveries: 1
- Stats at Pro Football Reference

Samuel Jason Mathews (born February 9, 1971) is an American former professional football player who was an offensive tackle in the National Football League (NFL). He played for the Indianapolis Colts from 1994 to 1997 and the Tennessee Oilers/Titans from 1998 to 2004.

== Early life ==
Jason Mathews attended Bridge City High School in Bridge City, Texas, where he lettered in football, baseball, and track. After his graduation in 1989, he attended Brigham Young University for one year, playing defensive lineman. He spent his next three years of college eligibility at Texas A&M University. Mathews lettered all three years he was at Texas A&M, and started at right tackle during his junior and senior years. Mathews left A&M at the end of his college eligibility, one credit shy of graduation.

== Professional career ==
Mathews was selected by the Indianapolis Colts in the third round of the 1994 NFL draft to play right tackle and special teams. In his first year with the Colts, he played in 10 games. In his second year, he was the starting right tackle in all 16 regular-season games and the team's 3 playoff games as they fell just short of the AFC Championship. He played for the Colts for two more years, as left tackle, right tackle, reserve tackle, and on special teams.

In 1998, Mathews signed with the Tennessee Oilers (later the Tennessee Titans) as a free agent. The team earned the AFC Champshionship in 1999, and played the St. Louis Rams in Super Bowl XXXIV. The Titans list Mathews as being 6'5" tall and weighing 285 pounds.

In the 2003 offseason, Mathews returned to school so that he could finish the requirements for his degree. In 2004, Mathews joined other members of the community in personally greeting President George W. Bush as he visited Nashville. Mathews continued to play for the Titans, wearing number 76, until 2005.

== Post-NFL ==
In 2005, Mathews announced his retirement from football. He became the associate dean at Montgomery Bell Academy for 11th and 12th grades, and assisted with the school's football program. In 2006, Mathews began working as a facility coordinator for D1 Sports Training in Nashville. The facility is owned by Peyton Manning.

Mathews has taught Seminar and coached the football team at The Ensworth School. He has served as the Director of Admission at Brentwood Academy for the last 6 years. He is presently the Dean of Community Engagement at Brentwood Academy. He also coaches middle school offensive line at BA.

== Personal life ==
Mathews is married to the former Kim Roy, a fellow native of Bridge City. They have one son and one daughter, Bryce and Baylee. His son, Bryce, plays offensive tackle at the Liberty University. He has a brother Jeff who coaches high school football in Texas.
