= Confederate Memorial of the Wind =

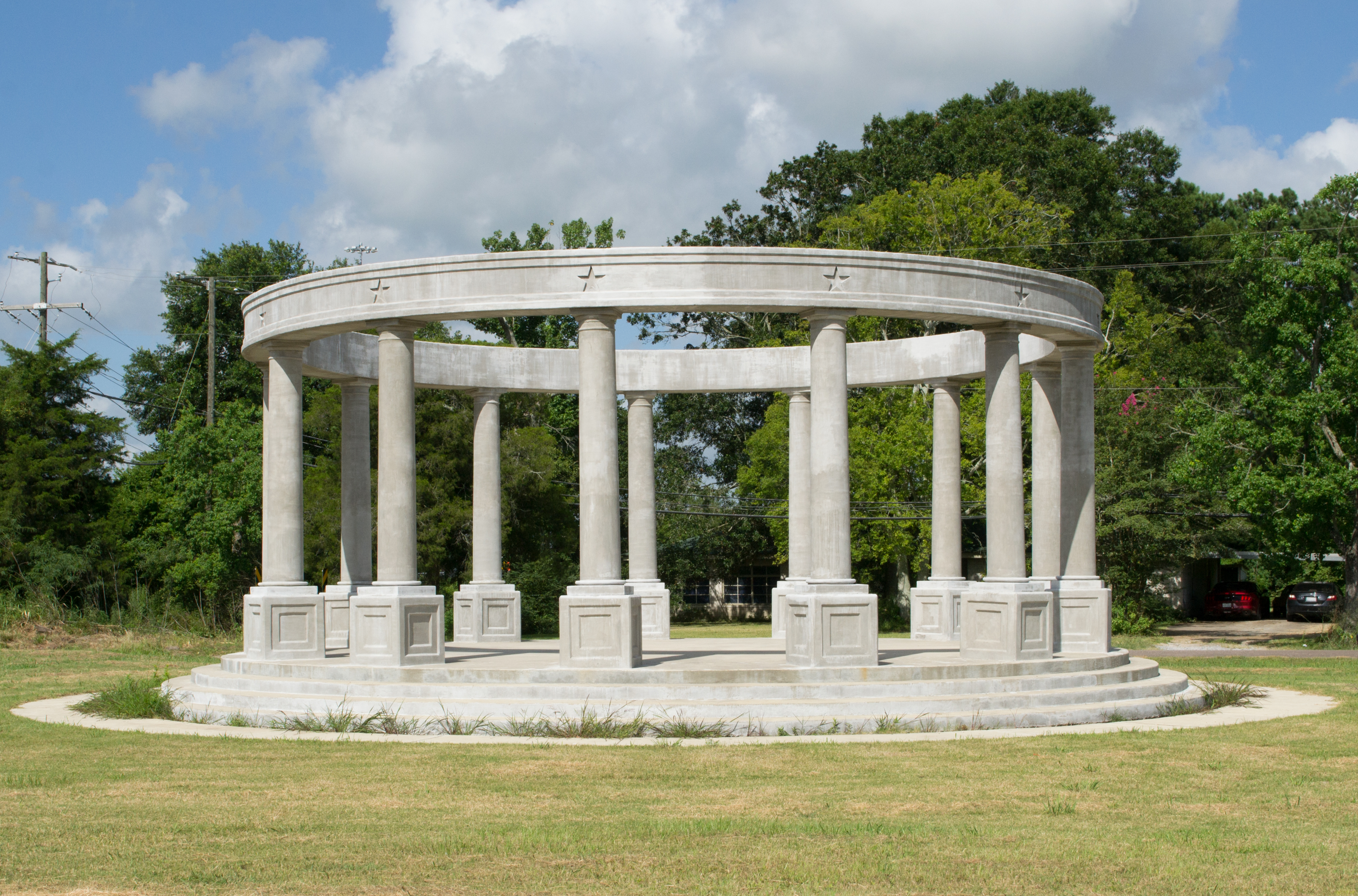
- Confederate Memorial of the Wind in 2015
- Interactive map of Confederate Memorial of the Wind
- Location: Orange, Texas
- Coordinates: 30°07′13.54″N 93°47′09.88″W
- Beginning date: 2013
- Dedicated to: Confederate States of America, Texas regiments of the Confederate Army

The Confederate Memorial of the Wind is a nearly completed memorial to the Confederate States of America and the Texas regiments of the Confederate Army. It began construction on private land in 2013 in Orange, Texas, near the Beaumont–Port Arthur metropolitan area.

The memorial is on private land adjacent to Interstate 10 on Martin Luther King Jr Drive. It has 13 columns arranged in a circle, one for each Confederate state. It will display 32 flags representing U.S. Civil War units from Texas, along with eight large Confederate flags visible from the highway. The project is sponsored by the Texas Division of the Sons of Confederate Veterans.

Proponents, led by Granvel Block, say the project will honor Civil War veterans and educate visitors on history, and say that the location was chosen for low cost. Opponents have condemned the memorial because of its connection to an effort to maintain slavery, and because they say its location is provocative, on Martin Luther King Jr Drive. The Beaumont Enterprise reported that the monument faced wide opposition from local residents and city council, which had no legal tools to stop construction. The city approved the plan on free speech grounds.

Donations are solicited in exchange for memorial plaques and paving bricks. No date is set for its completion, which depends on funding. The original budget was $50,000. By 2015, the site had already received enough visitors to cause parking congestion in the neighborhood.

The incomplete project has been the subject of protests seeking to change its plans.
