= Bridge City Independent School District =

School district in Texas, United States

Address
- 1031 West Roundbunch Road ESC Region 5 Bridge City, Texas; United States
- Coordinates: 30°2′5″N 93°51′13″W

District information
- Type: Independent school district
- Grades: Pre-K through 12
- Superintendent: Mike Kelly
- Schools: 4
- NCES District ID: 4811310

Students and staff
- Students: 3,235 (2023–2024)
- Teachers: 195.15 (on an FTE basis) (2023–2024)
- Staff: 194.13 (on an FTE basis) (2023–2024)
- Student–teacher ratio: 16.58 (2023–2024)
- Athletic conference: UIL Class 4A Football & Basketball
- District mascot: Cardinal
- Colors: Red and white

Other information
- TEA District Accountability Rating for 2011-12: Recognized
- Website: www.bridgecityisd.net

Bridge City Independent School District is a public school district based in Bridge City, Texas, United States. In addition to Bridge City, the district serves a portion of West Orange (west of State Highway 87) and portions of Orange and Port Arthur. The district operates one high school, Bridge City High School.

== Finances ==
As of the 2010-2011 school year, the appraised valuation of property in the district was $808,213,000. The maintenance tax rate was $0.104 and the bond tax rate was $0.015 per $100 of appraised valuation.

== Academic achievement ==
In 2011, the school district was rated "recognized" by the Texas Education Agency. Thirty-five percent of districts in Texas in 2011 received the same rating. No state accountability ratings will be given to districts in 2012. A school district in Texas can receive one of four possible rankings from the Texas Education Agency: Exemplary (the highest possible ranking), Recognized, Academically Acceptable, and Academically Unacceptable (the lowest possible ranking).

Historical district TEA accountability ratings

- 2011: Recognized
- 2010: Recognized
- 2009: Recognized
- 2008: Recognized
- 2007: Academically Acceptable
- 2006: Recognized
- 2005: Academically Acceptable
- 2004: Recognized

== Schools ==
In the 2018–2019 school year, the district operates four schools.

- Bridge City High School (Grades 9-12)
- Bridge City Middle School (Grades 6-8)
- Bridge City Intermediate School (Grades 3-5)
- Bridge City Elementary (Grades PK-2)

== Special programs ==
=== Athletics ===
Bridge City High School participates in the boys sports of baseball, basketball, football, and soccer, . The school participates in the girls sports of basketball, soccer, softball, and volleyball. For the 2014 through 2016 school years, Bridge City High School will play football in UIL Class 4A.

Bridge City won its only state championship in football in 1966 against McKinney High School 30-6 under head coach Harold "Chief" Wilson after losing to Brownwood High School the previous year.

== Notable alumni ==
- Matt Bryant, placekicker for the Atlanta Falcons of the National Football League
- Steve Worster, halfback for the University of Texas Longhorns 1968–1971
- Shane Dronett, defensive lineman for the Atlanta Falcons and Denver Broncos
- Jason Mathews, offensive tackle for the Indianapolis Colts and Tennessee Titans

== See also ==
- List of school districts in Texas
- List of high schools in Texas
