= Crew Health and Performance Exploration Analog =

Series of NASA missions

CHAPEA's patch

The Crew Health and Performance Exploration Analog (CHAPEA) is a series of missions conducted by NASA simulating missions on Mars. It consists of three missions, the first of which began on June 25, 2023. The mission is contained in a hangar at the Johnson Space Center in Houston, Texas. Efforts to mimic a real Mars mission include a 22-minute delay in communications, resources limitations, simulated equipment failures, and simulated spacewalks.

== Habitat ==
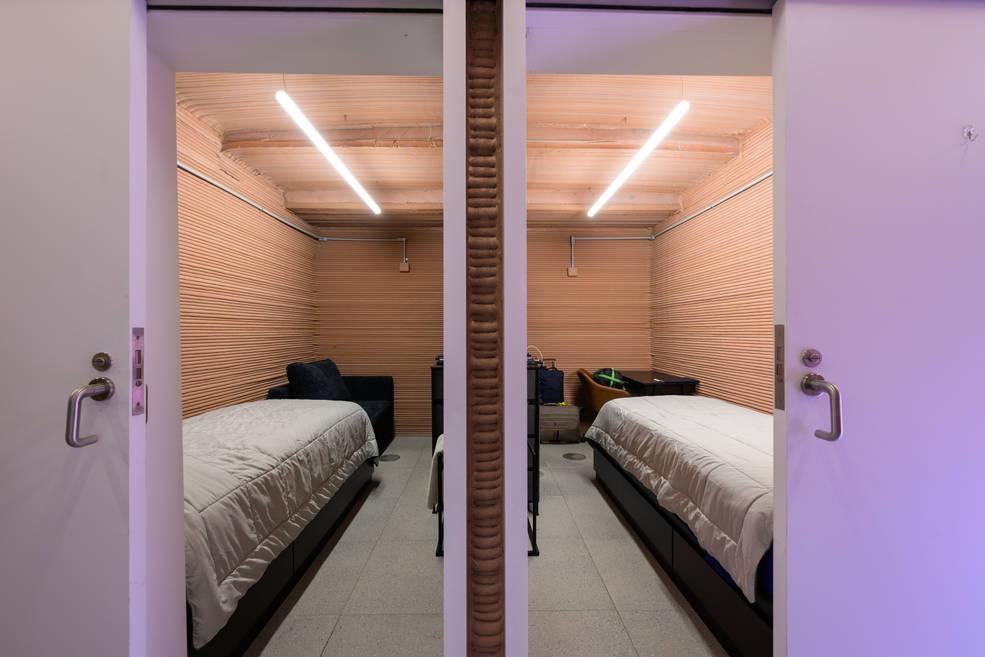
Living quarters for the crew members

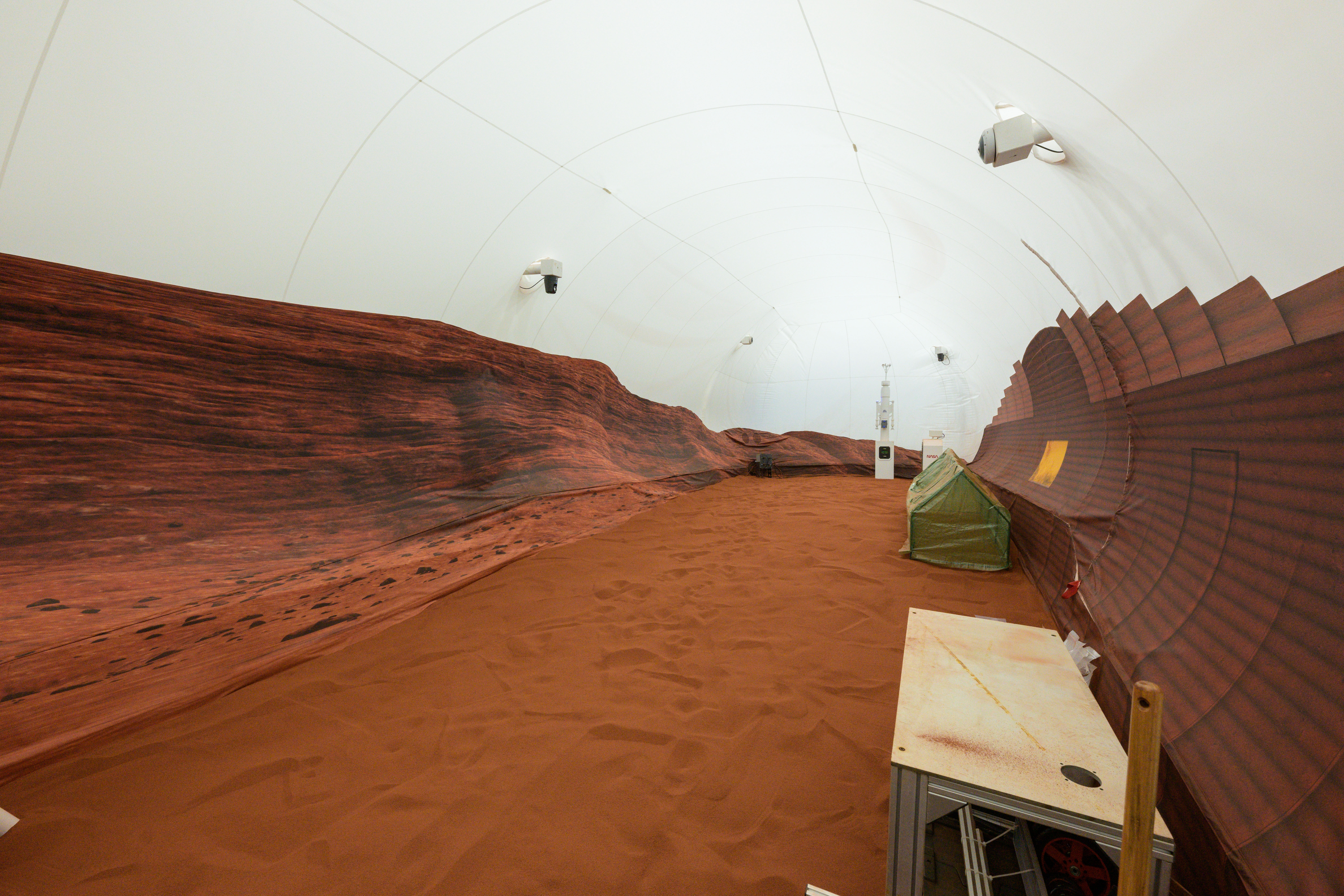
The exterior of Mars Dune Alpha simulates the surface of Mars.

The habitat, known as Mars Dune Alpha, is a 1700 square foot 3D-printed area designed to simulate the type of structure that would be built on a mission to Mars, constructed by Icon 3D. It includes crew quarters, an exercise area, a work room, a recreation area, and a crop area. The crop area has been used to grow peppers, tomatoes, and other vegetables. The exterior of the habitat simulates the surface of Mars complete with a backdrop of cliffs and a ground made of red soil, which on a real mission to Mars could be used to 3D print the habitat. To leave the hangar out to the exterior, crew members go through an airlock.

== Missions ==
The CHAPEA project consists of three missions.

=== CHAPEA 1 ===
NASA began looking for applicants for CHAPEA 1 in 2023 with the following qualifications:

1. Be either a permanent resident or a citizen of the United States
2. Be between 30 and 55 years old
3. Have either 1,000 hours of pilot-in-command time on a jet aircraft or have two years of experience in a related STEM field
4. Pass the NASA long-duration flight astronaut physical exam
5. Have a master's degree in STEM, two years of work toward a doctoral program in a STEM field, a M.D. or D.O. degree, or have completed a pilot school program.

The first CHAPEA mission began on June 25, 2023, with four crew members: Kelly Haston, a research scientist and the mission's commander, Ross Brockwell, a structural engineer and public works administrator, Nathan Jones, an emergency medicine physician, and Anca Selariu, a microbiologist. The mission concluded July 6, 2024, with a total duration time of 378 days.

=== CHAPEA 2 ===
The application process for the second CHAPEA mission was open from February 16 to April 2, 2024. On September 05, 2025 NASA announced the crew selected for the mission. The mission started in October 19, 2025 and ended October 31, 2026. This mission had four crew members: Ross Elder, mission commander, Ellen Ellis, medical officer, Matthew Montgomery, science officer, and James Spicer, flight engineer.

=== CHAPEA 3 ===
The third and final scheduled CHAPEA mission is scheduled to begin at some point in 2026.

== See also ==
- MARS-500
