= West Orange-Stark High School =

American public high school in West Orange, Texas

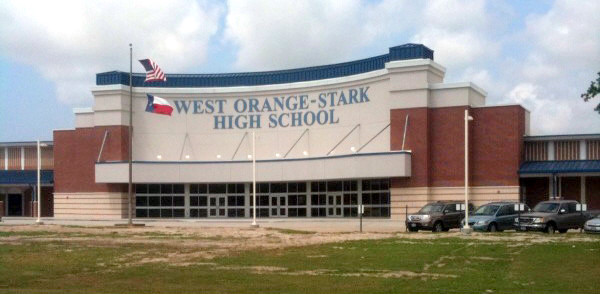
- West Orange-Stark High School in West Orange, Texas

Location
- 1400 Newton Avenue; West Orange, Texas; United States; 30.07709°N 93.76633°W

Information
- Type: Public, College Preparatory
- Motto: Are You Giving 112% Today?
- Founded: Building, 1966; Namesake, 1976
- School district: West Orange-Cove CISD
- Principal: Broderick McGrew
- Staff: 59.54 (FTE)
- Grades: 9–12
- Enrollment: 654 (2023–2024)
- Student to teacher ratio: 10.98
- Color: Navy Grey
- Athletics: Hiawatha Hickman(director)
- Mascot: Mustang
- Newspaper: Mustang Message
- Yearbook: Mustang Memories
- Website: hs.woccisd.net

West Orange-Stark High School is a College Preparatory High school in West Orange, Texas, and the only high school in the West Orange-Cove Consolidated Independent School District, though some students report to the West Orange-Stark Academic Alternative Center.

== History ==
The campus of West Orange High School was constructed in 1966. West Orange-Cove Consolidated ISD, which had West Orange High School (Purple and White Chiefs) and Lutcher Stark High School (Orange and Black Tigers), consolidated the two high schools in 1977–78. Previously, both high schools had operated separately – with four grade levels per campus. In 1977, the two high schools merged, giving students the opportunity to select new school colors and a new school mascot (Blue and Silver Mustangs). Referred to as the 'West' campus, West Orange-Stark High School's Newton Ave. school (the current WO-SHS) served the district's eleventh and twelfth grades; the former Lutcher Stark High school campus served the ninth and tenth grades as West Orange-Stark High School – East Campus. The first class of West Orange-Stark High School graduated in 1978.

In the mid-1990's, it was again necessary to close campuses due to drops in enrollment. Before this change was made, the West campus was added on to. The new two-story sections included two halls, a library, a second cafeteria, and enclosed the outside of the existing 600-hall. Along with this came a new Athletic, Band, and Theater building, on the west side of the campus, and a Career and Technology Center on the east side of the campus. All of these buildings are still present.

=== 2009 renovation ===
In 2009, as a part of the 2007 Bond, the high school was renovated and remodeled. It got a new facade, which allowed more organized and safer entrances. The high school received the least amount of renovations, as it was in the best shape. The high school renovations were the first to be completed.

=== 2011 retirement and resignation incentive ===
Due to minor local fund balance shortfalls, and projected state fund balance shortfalls, the West Orange-Cove CISD offered district staff a 10% (of annual pay) sign-off bonus. Retirees and resignees include; longtime coach and Athletic director Dan Hooks; 3 Industrial Trade teachers, which includes 1 Drivers Education teacher; Food Production staff, and many core class teachers. The district also decided to lay off 15 probationary employees, who have less than 2 years of service. The district decided also to cut the business program, allowing the 2 remaining Business teachers to teach Technology courses.

== Academics ==
Due to revisions of the accountability system by the Texas Education Agency, West Orange-Stark High School did not receive a rating for the 2012 accountability year.

The school offers a variety of Advanced Placement (AP) and dual enrollment courses through Lamar State College–Orange for juniors and seniors.

The school was designated a "Mentor High School" in 2000 and has been recognized as part of the High Schools That Work program for multiple years.

== Athletics ==
The Mustangs have several state and regional championships in all sports. The Mustangs Home stadium is named after Coach Dan Hooks, who was Athletic Director for 20+ years. Many WO-S High alumni become successful in both college and professional sports, such as recent graduate Earl Thomas, who was drafted in 2010 by the Seattle Seahawks.

During a September 17, 2010 game, team Quarterback Reginald Garrett walked to the sidelines and fell to the ground. It was rumored that he was having a seizure and also rumored that he had a history of seizures. His mother explained that he only had one seizure when he was three years old from a high fever and none since. While still conscious, he was removed from the field by paramedics. He was later pronounced dead at Memorial-Hermann Baptist Hospital – Orange. As the word of his death made its way across the stadium, fans poured out of Hooks Stadium to go visit the player's family at the hospital. The following game was cancelled.

On December 18, 2015, they won the State 4A/D2 Football Championship Game 22–3 over Celina High School, finishing the season with a record of 15–1, this was the 3rd time that the Mustangs won the a State Football Championship.

They won the 4A/D2 State Championship game again in 2016 defeating Sweetwater High School 24-6 for their 4th State Football Championship.

== Notable alumni ==
- Ernest Anderson, former professional football player
- Grant Anderson, professional baseball pitcher, Texas Rangers
- Tom Byron, pornographic actor, director, and producer
- Chris Cole, former professional football player, Denver Broncos
- Jim Colvin, former professional football player, Baltimore Colts, Dallas Cowboys, and New York Giants
- Ox Emerson, former professional football player, Detroit Lions
- Frances Fisher, movie/television/stage actress; graduated from Lutcher Stark, before the consolidation
- Pat Gibbs, former professional football player, Philadelphia Eagles; graduated from Lutcher Stark, before the consolidation
- Greg Hill, former professional football player, Houston Oilers, Kansas City Chiefs, and Los Angeles Raiders
- Chuck Knipp, comedian
- John Patterson, former professional baseball player, Arizona Diamondbacks and Montreal Expos/Washington Nationals
- R. C. Slocum, longtime football coach at Texas A&M
- Kevin Smith, former professional football player, Dallas Cowboys
- Earl Thomas, former professional football player, Baltimore Ravens and Seattle Seahawks
- Deionte Thompson, former professional football player, Arizona Cardinals
