= Orange, Texas =

City in Orange County, Texas, United States

- City
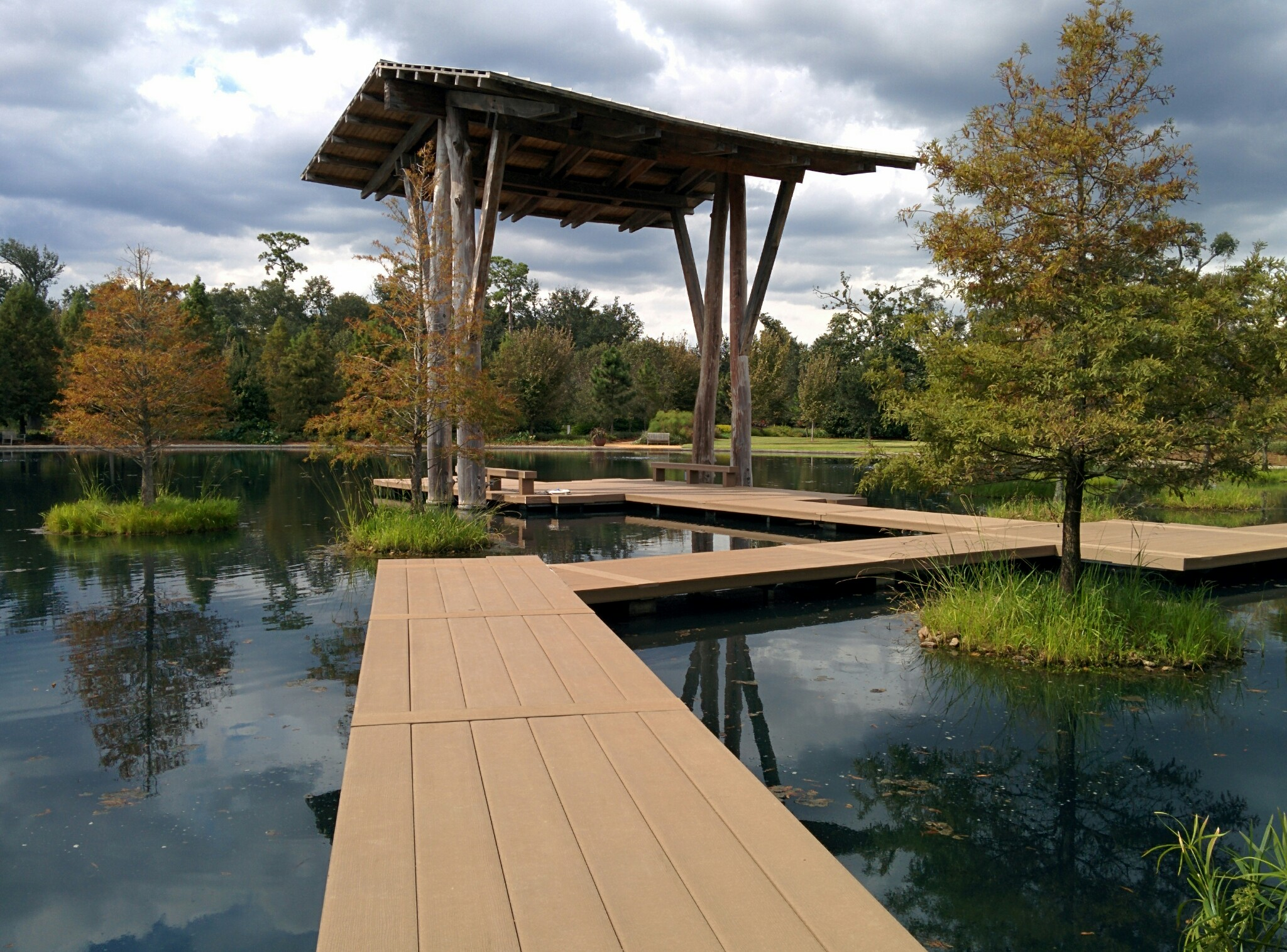
- Nicknames: Gateway City, Gatecity, Fruit City
- Motto: Small town charm, world class culture
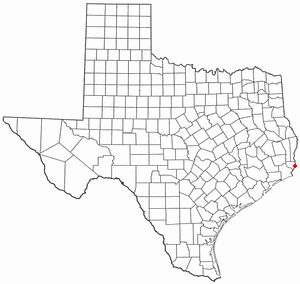
- Location of Orange, Texas

- Coordinates: 30°07′10″N 93°46′20″W
- Country: United States
- State: Texas
- County: Orange
- Community: 1830 as Green's Bluff
- Renamed: 1840 as Madison
- County seat: 1852
- Incorporated: 1858 as Orange

Government
  - Type: Council–manager

Area
  - Total: 21.456 sq mi (55.571 km^{2})
  - Land: 21.352 sq mi (55.301 km^{2})
  - Water: 2.104 sq mi (5.450 km^{2})
- Elevation: 10 ft (3.0 m)

Population (2020)
  - Total: 19,324
  - Estimate (2022): 19,081
  - Density: 890/sq mi (345/km^{2})
- Demonym: Orangite
- Time zone: UTC–7 (Central (CST))
  - Summer (DST): UTC–6 (CDT)
- ZIP Codes: 77630, 77631, 77632
- Area code: 409
- FIPS code: 48-54132
- GNIS feature ID: 2411326
- Website: orangetexas.gov

Orange is a city in and the county seat of Orange County, Texas, United States. The population was 19,324 at the 2020 census. It is the easternmost city in Texas, located on the Sabine River at the border with Louisiana, and is 113 miles (182 km) from Houston. Orange is part of the Beaumont–Port Arthur metropolitan area. Founded in 1836, it is a deep-water port to the Gulf of Mexico.

== History ==
This community was originally called Greens Bluff after a man named Resin Green, a Sabine River boatman, who arrived at this location sometime before 1830. A short time later, in 1840, the town was renamed Madison in honor of President James Madison. To resolve the frequent post-office confusion with another Texas community called Madisonville, the town was renamed "Orange" in 1858. The area experienced rapid growth in the late 19th century due to 17 sawmills within the city limits, making Orange the center of the Texas lumber industry. Orange's growth led to the arrival of many immigrants in the late 19th century, including a moderately sized Jewish population by 1896. In 1898, the county built a courthouse in the city, which later burned down and was replaced by the Orange County Courthouse.

The harbor leading into the Port of Orange was dredged in 1914 to accommodate large ships. Ship building during World War I contributed to the growth in population and economy. The Great Depression, not surprisingly, affected the city negatively, and the local economy was not boosted again until World War II. A U.S. Naval Station was installed and additional housing was provided for thousands of defense workers and servicemen and their families. The population increased to just over 60,000 residents. USS Aulick was the first of 300 ships of various types built in Orange during the war.

After the war, the peace-time population decreased to about 35,000. At this time, the Navy Department announced it had selected Orange as one of eight locations where it would store reserve vessels. The area of the shipyards provided a favorable location, as the Sabine River furnished an abundant supply of fresh water to prevent saltwater corrosion. Also during this period, the local chemical plants expanded, which boosted the economy. The chemical industry continues today as a leading source of revenue to the area. The U.S. Naval Station became a Naval Inactive Ship Maintenance Facility in December 1975, retained 18.5 acres as a Navy and Marine Corps Reserve Center, but decommissioned the center completely in September 2008.

The Port of Orange became the home to the USS Orleck, one of the few naval ships remaining that was built at the Orange shipyards during World War II. The city of Orange sustained a direct hit from Hurricane Rita in 2005, causing damage to the ship. The city decreed that the ship be moved and a new location was sought, including one in Arkansas and Lake Charles, Louisiana, for a new home. On May 6, 2009, the Lake Charles city council voted in favor of an ordinance authorizing the city to enter into a "Cooperative Endeavor Agreement" with USS Orleck. On May 20, 2010, the ship was moved to Lake Charles. The grand opening was on April 10, 2011.

=== Hurricane Ike ===
Orange was heavily damaged by Hurricane Ike on September 13, 2008. Damage was widespread and severe across Orange County. The 22-foot (6.7 m) storm surge breached the city's levees, caused catastrophic flooding and damage throughout the city. The storm surge traveled up the Neches River to also flood Rose City.

Orange received winds at hurricane force. Nearly the entire city of 19,000 people was flooded, from 6 in (15 cm) to 15 ft (4.5 m). The mayor of the city said about 375 people, of those who stayed behind during the storm, began to emerge, some needing food, water, and medical care. Many dead fish littered streets and properties. Three people were found dead in Orange County on September 29.

=== Hurricane Harvey ===
Orange once again fell victim to widespread flooding when Hurricane Harvey hit the city on August 29, 2017. The flood waters were mostly caused by the rising of the nearby Sabine River, which forms the border between Texas and Louisiana, and its many tributaries. The flooding from Harvey was due to extreme rainfall (50" to 60" in 48 hours) that fell after the storm's landfall, leaving 65% of the county under water. The Sabine did not rise until three days after the storm, when the flood gates of the Toledo Bend Reservoir were opened.

== Geography ==
According to the United States Census Bureau, the city has a total area of 21.456 square miles (55.57 km^{2}), of which 21.352 square miles (55.30 km^{2}) are land and 2.104 square miles (5.45 km^{2}), is water.

=== Climate ===
Orange has a humid subtropical climate. Winters are mild and rainy, while summers are hot, humid, and wet. The climate is similar to nearby Vinton, Louisiana, and Beaumont, Texas. The record high in Orange is 111 °F (43.9 °C) recorded August 11, 2019. The record low is 10 °F (−12.2 °C) recorded January 22, 2025.

Climate data for Orange, Texas, 1991–2020 normals, extremes 1962–present
Month	Jan	Feb	Mar	Apr	May	Jun	Jul	Aug	Sep	Oct	Nov	Dec	Year
Record high °F (°C)	81 (27)	86 (30)	87 (31)	93 (34)	98 (37)	101 (38)	104 (40)	111 (44)	107 (42)	99 (37)	89 (32)	82 (28)	111 (44)
Mean maximum °F (°C)	75.7 (24.3)	77.9 (25.5)	82.0 (27.8)	85.8 (29.9)	90.8 (32.7)	94.3 (34.6)	96.0 (35.6)	97.0 (36.1)	94.3 (34.6)	89.6 (32.0)	82.5 (28.1)	77.6 (25.3)	98.0 (36.7)
Mean daily maximum °F (°C)	60.7 (15.9)	63.9 (17.7)	70.4 (21.3)	76.1 (24.5)	82.6 (28.1)	88.0 (31.1)	89.9 (32.2)	90.3 (32.4)	86.6 (30.3)	79.3 (26.3)	69.3 (20.7)	62.4 (16.9)	76.6 (24.8)
Daily mean °F (°C)	50.5 (10.3)	54.0 (12.2)	60.3 (15.7)	66.0 (18.9)	73.5 (23.1)	79.3 (26.3)	81.3 (27.4)	81.3 (27.4)	77.0 (25.0)	68.1 (20.1)	58.3 (14.6)	52.2 (11.2)	66.8 (19.3)
Mean daily minimum °F (°C)	40.3 (4.6)	44.0 (6.7)	50.2 (10.1)	55.8 (13.2)	64.3 (17.9)	70.5 (21.4)	72.6 (22.6)	72.2 (22.3)	67.4 (19.7)	57.0 (13.9)	47.2 (8.4)	41.9 (5.5)	57.0 (13.9)
Mean minimum °F (°C)	26.0 (−3.3)	30.4 (−0.9)	34.0 (1.1)	41.1 (5.1)	49.9 (9.9)	63.1 (17.3)	67.9 (19.9)	67.0 (19.4)	55.1 (12.8)	40.7 (4.8)	31.8 (−0.1)	28.2 (−2.1)	24.1 (−4.4)
Record low °F (°C)	10 (−12)	13 (−11)	23 (−5)	28 (−2)	41 (5)	52 (11)	57 (14)	58 (14)	42 (6)	29 (−2)	23 (−5)	10 (−12)	10 (−12)
Average precipitation inches (mm)	5.65 (144)	4.18 (106)	3.52 (89)	4.18 (106)	5.14 (131)	6.84 (174)	5.82 (148)	6.71 (170)	6.44 (164)	5.96 (151)	4.71 (120)	5.26 (134)	64.41 (1,637)
Average precipitation days (≥ 0.01 in)	11.5	10.7	9.2	8.7	8.9	11.8	13.1	13.0	10.5	8.8	9.5	11.1	126.8
Source 1: NOAA
Source 2: National Weather Service

== Demographics ==
Historical population
Census	Pop.	Note	%±
1860	936		—
1890	3,173		—
1900	3,835		20.9%
1910	5,527		44.1%
1920	9,212		66.7%
1930	7,913		−14.1%
1940	7,472		−5.6%
1950	21,174		183.4%
1960	25,605		20.9%
1970	24,457		−4.5%
1980	23,628		−3.4%
1990	19,381		−18.0%
2000	18,643		−3.8%
2010	18,595		−0.3%
2020	19,324		3.9%
2022 (est.)	19,081		−1.3%
U.S. Decennial Census; 2020 Census

=== 2020 census ===
As of the 2020 census, Orange had a population of 19,324. The median age was 37.8 years. 24.1% of residents were under the age of 18 and 17.1% of residents were 65 years of age or older. For every 100 females there were 92.9 males, and for every 100 females age 18 and over there were 90.1 males age 18 and over.

There were 7,870 households in Orange, of which 30.6% had children under the age of 18 living in them. Of all households, 38.1% were married-couple households, 21.1% were households with a male householder and no spouse or partner present, and 34.5% were households with a female householder and no spouse or partner present. About 31.7% of all households were made up of individuals and 13.1% had someone living alone who was 65 years of age or older. There were 4,966 families residing in the city.

The population density was 904.9 inhabitants per square mile (349.4/km^{2}). There were 9,239 housing units, of which 14.8% were vacant. The homeowner vacancy rate was 1.9% and the rental vacancy rate was 16.6%.

97.4% of residents lived in urban areas, while 2.6% lived in rural areas.

Racial composition as of the 2020 census
Race	Number	Percent
White	9,945	51.5%
Black or African American	6,858	35.5%
American Indian and Alaska Native	89	0.5%
Asian	340	1.8%
Native Hawaiian and Other Pacific Islander	8	0.0%
Some other race	772	4.0%
Two or more races	1,312	6.8%
Hispanic or Latino (of any race)	1,843	9.5%

=== 2010 census ===
As of the 2010 census, there were 18,595 people, 7,585 households, and 5,021 families resided in the city. The population density was 872.7 inhabitants per square mile (337.0/km^{2}). There were 8,868 housing units averaged 441.7 per square mile (170.5/km^{2}). The racial makeup of the city was 60.9% White, 33.2% African American, 0.3% Native American, 1.7% Asian, 1.08% from other races, and 2.0% from two or more races. Hispanics or Latinos of any race were 5.2% of the population. The average household size was 2.41.

In Orange, the population is distributed as 27.4% under the age of 18, 8.7% from 18 to 24, 26.5% from 25 to 44, 21.7% from 45 to 64, and 15.8% who were 65 years of age or older. The median age was 36 years. For every 100 females, there were 92.4 males. For every 100 females age 18 and over, there were 86.2 males. The median income for a household in the city was $29,519, and for a family was $37,473. Males had a median income of $37,238 versus $21,445 for females. The per capita income for the city was $16,535. About 20.5% of families and 22.9% of the population were below the poverty line, including 34.0% of those under age 18 and 16.0% of those age 65 or over' 20.3% of the population was below the poverty line, compared to 15.1% of the national population.

== Economy ==
The Texas Department of Criminal Justice operates the Orange District Parole Office in Orange.

== Arts and culture ==
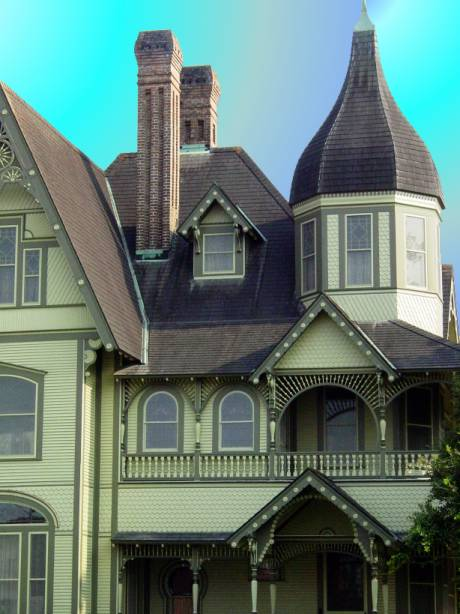
The W.H. Stark House preserves the early days of Orange and lumber barons.

The City of Orange hosts several cultural attractions. The Stark Museum of Art houses one of the finest collections of 19th- and 20th-century Western American art and artifacts in the country. The collection focuses on the land, people, and wildlife of the American West. The museum also holds a significant collection of American Indian art, as well as collections of glass and porcelain, and rare books and manuscripts. The museum features the work of artists such as artist/naturalist John James Audubon, Paul Kane, Albert Bierstadt, Thomas Moran, and John Mix Stanley.

The W. H. Stark House is a careful restoration of an 1894 Victorian home, typical of a wealthy Southeast Texas family. The 15-room, three-storied structure with its many gables, galleries, and distinctive windowed turret, shows the influence of several architectural styles.

The First Presbyterian Church on Green Avenue is a strong example of the classic Greek Revival architecture. Completed in 1912, it was the first air-conditioned public building west of the Mississippi River and its dome is the only opalescent glass dome in the United States.

The Confederate Memorial of the Wind is being built on private land at the intersection of Interstate 10 and Martin Luther King Jr Drive.

== Government ==
The city operates under the council-manager form of government.

== Education ==
The City of Orange is served by, in different portions, Little Cypress-Mauriceville Consolidated Independent School District, the West Orange-Cove Consolidated Independent School District, the Orangefield Independent School District, and the Bridge City Independent School District.

Lamar State College–Orange is a community college and part of the Texas State University System.

As of 2024 the Texas Education Code does not specify which community college system Orange is in.

== Media ==
The Orange Leader is a semi-weekly newspaper.

KOGT is a newsfeed of happenings in the area.

== Infrastructure ==
=== Transportation ===
Orange is served by Interstate 10, as well as a deep-water seaport. Commercial aviation service is located at nearby Southeast Texas Regional Airport, and general aviation service is provided by Orange County Airport.

Orange has the distinction of having exit 880 on Interstate 10 within its city limits, which is the highest numbered exit and mile marker on an interstate highway or freeway in North America. Orange is also home to the famed highway sign on westbound Interstate 10 that shows it being 23 miles from Beaumont, but 857 miles from El Paso, reminding drivers of how far they have to follow Interstate 10 before they can leave Texas.

== Notable people ==
- Bonnie Baker, singer
- Marcia Ball, singer
- Jason Ballard, housing entrepeneur
- Michael Berry
- Tom Byron, adult film star
- Clarence "Gatemouth" Brown
- Edgar William Brown, business leader and philanthropist
- Matt Bryant, longtime placekicker in NFL
- Chris Cole, American football player
- John Oliver Creighton, NASA Astronaut
- Shane Dronett
- Clyde D. Eddleman
- Frances Fisher
- O'Shaquie Foster, American Boxing World Champion
- Donovan Gans
- Greg Hill, American football player
- Charles Holcomb
- Brandon Johnson, Athlete
- Bobby Kimball
- Danny Klam
- Chuck Knipp
- Ernie Ladd, American football player and wrestler
- Janette Sebring Lowrey
- Henry J. Lutcher, lumber baron
- Jason Mathews
- Haskell Monroe
- Danielle Panabaker, actress
- Kay Panabaker, zoologist and retired actress
- John Patterson, baseball player
- Bum Phillips, American football coach
- Wade Phillips, American football coach
- Andre Robertson, baseball player
- Chad Shelton, opera singer
- R. C. Slocum, American football player and coach
- Bubba Smith, American football player
- Kevin Smith, American football player
- Tody Smith
- William Henry Stark, business leader and philanthropist
- Lee Stringer
- Earl Thomas, American football player
- Deionte Thompson, American football player
- Liz Wickersham, television writer and producer
