= Henry J. Lutcher =

Henry Lutcher
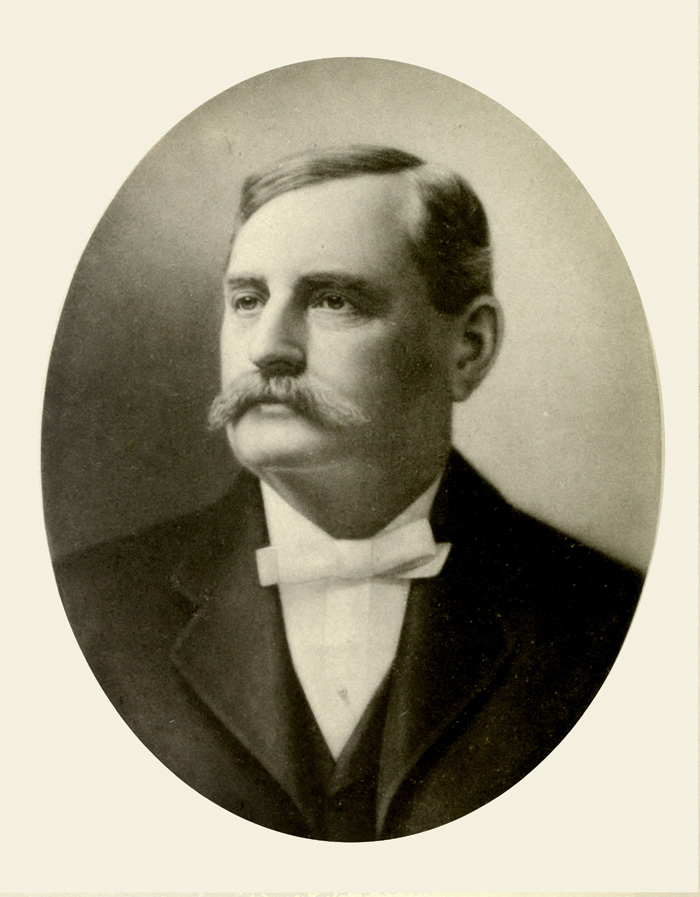
- Born: November 4, 1836; Williamsport, Pennsylvania
- Died: October 2, 1912 (aged 75); Cincinnati, Ohio
- Known for: Sawmill owner
- Spouse: Frances Ann Robinson
- Children: 2

Henry Jacob Lutcher (November 4, 1836 – October 2, 1912) was a sawmiller and business partner of the Lutcher and Moore Lumber Company. His business ventures would help establish Orange, Texas, as the timber-processing capital of the South in the late 19th and early 20th centuries.

== Biography ==
Henry J. Lutcher was born on November 4, 1836, in Williamsport, Pennsylvania, the son of Lewis and Barbara Lutcher, who were German immigrants. In 1858, he married his hometown sweetheart, Frances Ann Robinson. According to Lutcher, her sound business judgment was the key to his many economic successes. The Lutcher-Robinson marriage produced two daughters, Miriam, who became Mrs. William Henry Stark, and Carrie Launa, who married Dr. Edgar William Brown.

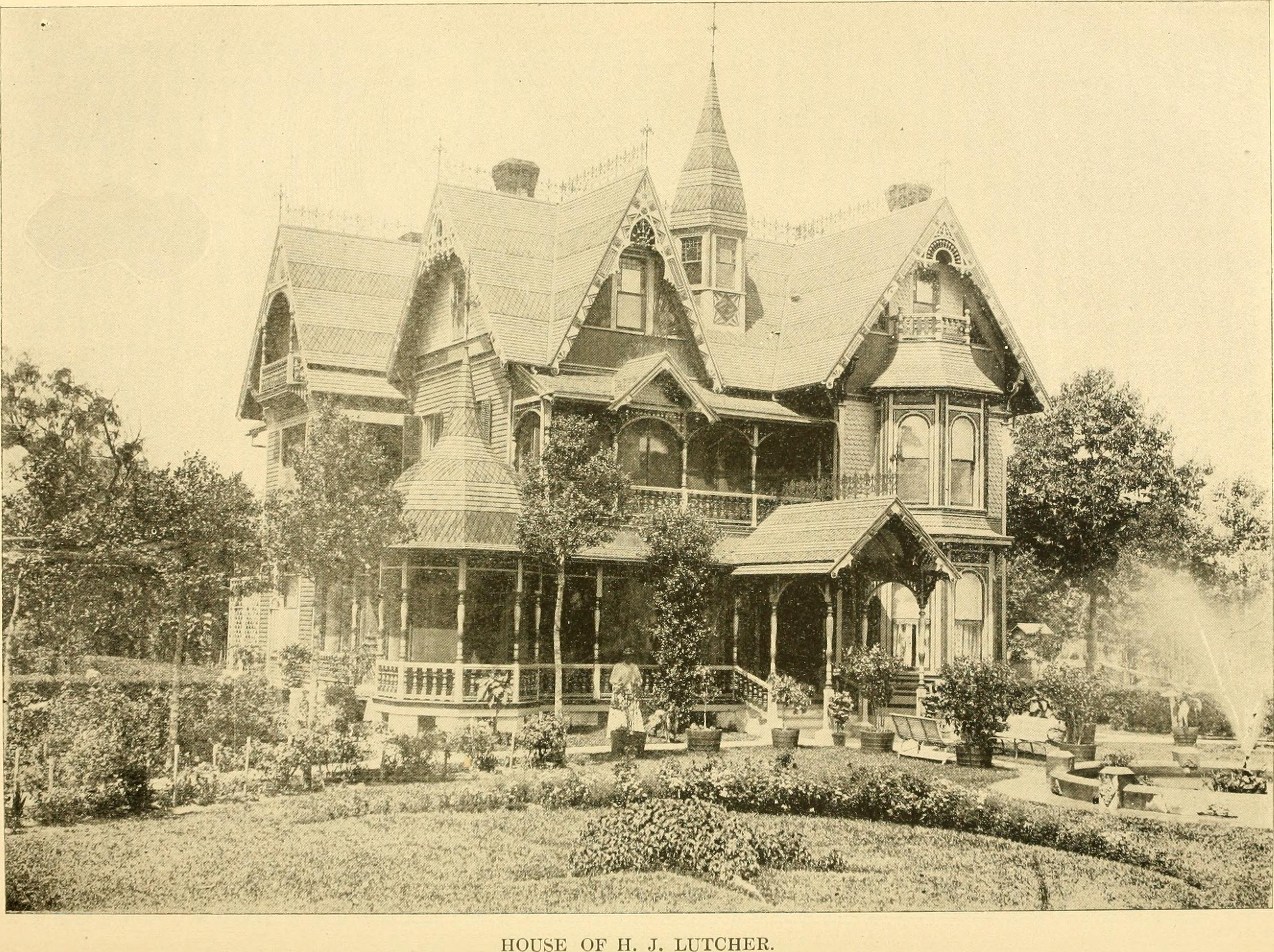
House of H. J. Lutcher

In his hometown in 1862, he began his career in the lumber industry with a joint venture with John Waltman. Two years later, Lutcher purchased Waltman's interest in the business, and the Lutcher and Moore Lumber Company was established. Realizing the profit potential of lumber sales and cattle-buying, the two partners moved to Texas in 1877 and expanded their business onto the bank of the Sabine River. The city of Orange was chosen by the partners, primarily due to the proximity to the nearby tracts of land with enormous pine trees, and the ability to use the river to transport the lumber to the markets. Lutcher purchased more than 500,000 acres (2,000 km^{2}) of land in the southwest Louisiana parishes of Calcasieu and Beauregard. To transport the timber, he built approximately 100 miles (160 km) of tram road known as the Gulf, Sabine and Red River Railroad. By 1900, this operation employed more than 500 men as loggers in the nearby forests.

During the 1880s, Lutcher purchased a fifty square-mile (130 km^{2}) tract of virgin cypress swamp near the Mississippi River, and in 1889, he built a sawmill in St. James Parish at a town that was named after him. Lutcher, Louisiana, is still a prosperous community, on the east bank of the River between Baton Rouge and New Orleans.

Lutcher died in Cincinnati on October 2, 1912. His economic contributions, including that of his two sons-in-law W.H. Stark and E.W. Brown, helped establish Orange, Texas, as an industrial center on the Gulf of Mexico.
