= William Henry Stark =

William Henry Stark (March 19, 1851 – October 8, 1936) was an industrial leader whose contributions helped the city of Orange, Texas develop financially. Stark was the president of the Lutcher Moore Cypress Lumber Company of Lutcher, Louisiana.

Stark was born March 19, 1851, to John Thomas and Martha Ann (Skidmore) Stark. Originally from San Augustine County, Stark lived in Burkeville, Texas and Newton, Texas before moving to Orange in 1870 to seek employment in the sawmills. He worked in the early area sawmills and would soon become a leader of the local lumber industry. In 1881, Stark married Miriam Melissa Lutcher (1859–1936), the daughter of Henry J. Lutcher, a partner in the Lutcher and Moore Lumber Company. In the early 1880s, Stark's expertise in the lumber business would soon land him the position of managing two mills belonging to his father-in-law's firm in Louisiana. Stark's success in the lumber industry led him to invest in other businesses such as iron and coal production, real estate, and ranching. His innovative ideas, including development of the deep water ports on the Sabine River and an irrigation system that provided needed resources for the region's rice industry, led to increased population growth for the city of Orange.

Stark also served as a regent for the University of Texas System, 1911–15, an office later held by his son H.J.Lutcher Stark, who became chairman of the University Board.

Stark died on October 8, 1936, and was buried in Evergreen Cemetery in Orange, Texas. The Texas Historical Commission has constructed a marker to commemorate his contributions to the city.
