= West Orange-Cove Consolidated Independent School District =

School district in Texas, United States

Address
- 902 West Park Orange, Texas, 77631; United States

District information
- Type: Public
- Motto: "Empowering Lives Through Excellence Everyday."
- Grades: PK–12
- Established: 1967; 59 years ago
- Superintendent: Dr. Alicia Sigee
- Schools: 4
- NCES District ID: 4845090

Students and staff
- Enrollment: 2,573 (2023–2024)
- Teachers: 188.94 (on an FTE basis) (2023–2024)
- Staff: 270.92 (on an FTE basis) (2023–2024)
- Student–teacher ratio: 13.62 (2023–2024)
- District mascot: Mustang
- Colors: Navy and Grey

Other information
- Website: www.woccisd.net

The West Orange-Cove Consolidated Independent School District is a public school district in Orange County, Texas.

The district serves the cities of West Orange and Pinehurst as well as portions of Orange, including the majority of Orange below I-10, and the Old Peveto area. The district has 4 schools, including West Orange-Stark High School and West Orange-Stark Middle School.

== History ==
West Orange-Cove was ultimately formed from the West Orange, Cove, and Orange Independent School Districts. Shortly after West Orange and Cove consolidated (1965–1966), the new West Orange-Cove was forced to by the Texas Education Agency absorb Orange Public Schools, which had recently dropped its status as an ISD, and operated through the City of Orange. The final consolidation was in 1967. The district's name upon consolidation was West Orange-Cove Consolidated Independent School District.

=== West Orange ISD and Cove ISD History ===
Although unknown when the dates of operation were, the children of the West Orange area went to a small building, serving grades only up to 8, on Western Avenue, until it caught fire. This having been shortly after Lorena Oates Elementary was erected, in 1949, a new campus was constructed, to serve the 'upper' grades, on Western. It had a state-of-the-art auditorium, and the district's administrative offices. Before this campus was built, high school students would attend Orange, or Lutcher-Stark (depending on the years) High School, of the Orange ISD. The class of 1956 was the first to graduate from West Orange High, then represented by the purple and white Chief. In 1966, West Orange ISD constructed, one block down from Lorena Oates Elementary, a separate West Orange High School campus. The Western Avenue campus became West Orange Junior High School.

Cove ISD, which also served grades K-8, in one building, was part of the 1967 consolidation. Until then it served as a school for the Cove Incorporation, which was dissolved subsequently with the consolidation. The Cove school saw at least two buildings in its duration. One, still standing on the corner of Campus, dates back to the 1950s.

=== Orange ISD and Orange Public Schools history ===
Orange ISD is believed to be the first public school district. Its roots go even farther back. The first sign of public education in Orange, then called 'Madison', was in 1857, when two "common schools" were recorded with a total enrollment of 70 pupils. Much of the history of the Orange Independent School District centers around one Green Avenue location, that saw over five different campus names and buildings.

==== Green @ 13th campuses ====
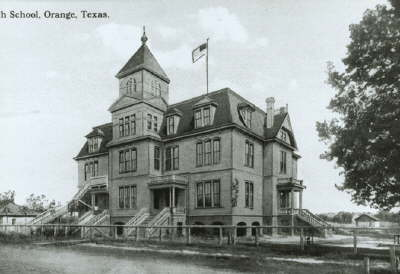
The second OHS

The campus directly off of Green Ave. is believed to be the district's oldest campus. Before 2010, it consisted of two buildings: the 'Stark' Building, which used to be Lutcher-Stark High, and the Carr Building, which used to be Helen Carr Junior High. The street that ran between them, 13th, was demolished, and a building now conjoins the former two buildings, which was an effect of the 2007 Bond Project.

Orange High School started out in a three-story building, which stood where West Orange-Stark Middle School stands today. Built in the 1890s, the original Orange High School closed around the 1920s, when the huge new OHS, built in the downtown area, was opened. It served students until the 1940s, when Lutcher-Stark High School was built, directly across from the original Orange High School location (which had been turned into Carr Junior High, named after Helen Carr, the then Director of Secondary Instruction). The Downtown Orange High School was demolished. Shortly after these events, in the early 1950s, a new one-story Carr Junior High was built around the existing Carr building. After its completion, the old Carr was demolished much later, in the very early 1980s.

In the 'Game' gym at West Orange-Stark High School, a large, orange 'OHS' logo can still be seen above the stage, as a bit of memorabilia of the Tigers that once walked the halls of that location. Since 2005, there is also a large Tiger memorial, near the front of the campus, for all OHS and LSHS students.

Both buildings have gone under multiple renovations and expansions, including the Stark addition (expanding the campus to the edge of Pine), the cafeteria expansion, the Stark gym remodeling, the building of a second gym, a storage building, a band hall (later demolished, as a part of the 200 bond), and many more. As of the 1950s, quite a few "mobile trailers" could be seen on campus. The reason for the presence of those is unknown. They are gone now, and have been for at least 30 years. There were also houses located where the 'annex' (the part of the Stark building closest to Pine, which is separated on the first floor by a breezeway, which was added quite a few years after the school was built) now is. Although it is implied by records that they were utilized by the district.

When the original OHS became Carr Jr. High, part of the original building was joined as a wing of Carr, and is still standing. The wing consisted of at least one shop. Intended for Auto Mechanics, the wing contained several garage openings – since filled in. The room, once used by OHS, and again by Lutcher-Stark students, is now used by WO-SMS personnel.

Much of the Stark building is still original, including certain "materials" (tile, doors, etc.) which are the original L-S High 'Tigers' colors. Things currently present in the school can also be seen in school pictures from the 1950s.

==== Other schools ====
Moten/Wallace as it stands today

Moten/Wallace High, the first segregated school, opened in the early 1920s. It was replaced by North High in the early 1960s. It still stands on the corner of 1st and John.

Many elementary schools served Orange ISD, including the large Anderson School, which was repetitively rebuilt at its 8th and Park location. In the 1980s, the Anderson School name would see its last new building: a huge, contemporary, two-story building, in its original location. This building is now the Alternative Education Center. Other elementary schools that served Orange ISD include:

- Jonas B Salk Elementary (one of the most 'crowded' schools. Was in Roselawn. 1950s–1985. After consolidation, it was used as an elementary, until 1994, and then an early elementary until 1996, when it was moved to North. The building still sits on the corners of 37th and Azalea. It is used as a church now.)
- Tilley Elementary (was in Riverside (Naval Base neighborhood,) closed in 60s or 70s. Named after fallen WWII soldier.)
- Colburn Elementary (also in or near Riverside. Closed along with Tilley. Also named after fallen WWII soldier.)
- Jones Elementary (served as elementary until 1991, when it was converted to an alternative school. Campus was sold in mid-2000s.)
- Franklin Elementary (Stood until 1990 on same location as what is now HEB.)
- Bancroft Elementary (Still stands. Sold in 2005. Built in 50s.)
- Curtis School (1923. Elementary school. Still stands today. Used as a nursing home.)

=== West Orange-Cove CISD History ===
Upon the 1967 consolidation, the North High School, an all black high school, was open, along with West Orange High, and Stark High. West Orange-Cove, now housed in the Orange ISD's Administration offices, decided that North was not needed, and unable to be used for segregated education, due to the new laws, and it was turned into a Middle School. In 1977, West Orange High and Stark High consolidated with 2 grades in each campus, as opposed to 4 grades in each. The new name was decided to be West Orange-Stark High, with the West Campus on Newton, serving the upper two grades, and the East Campus at the former Lutcher-Stark High School Campus, serving the lower two grades. In 1985, each elementary school's highest grade level was 4th grade and all 5th and 6th graders across the district attended MB North Intermediate School, and 7th and 8th graders attended West Orange Middle School on Western Street. In the mid-1990s, West Orange Middle and North Intermediate, consolidated into the West Orange Middle Campus, on Western, which, before 1967, also housed West Orange ISD's K-8 and Administration offices. Shortly after this, the West and East High School campuses consolidated, and became housed at the Newton campus. The middle school moved to the Stark campus, and the Western Ave. campus became an Intermediate school. The North campus sat empty for 5 years until it replaced Salk as the Early Elementary and Head Start Center. In 2003, the Intermediate school closed, sending the 5th grade to 3 different Elementary schools, and the 6th grade went to the former Stark campus, along with 7th & 8th grades. In 2005, after the closure of Bancroft Elementary, Anderson Elementary became the only campus to serve K-3, with the help of approx. 9 mobile buildings, and Lorena Oates became the new Intermediate, serving 4th & 5th grades. In 2010, West Orange-Stark Elementary was opened, easily serving grades K-5 in approx. 250,000 square feet (23,000 m^{2}). The Lorena Oates and Anderson buildings became unused. The 2011 Bond Project decided that Anderson would be used as an Administration Building/Alternative Center/Community Outreach Facility.

== Facilities ==
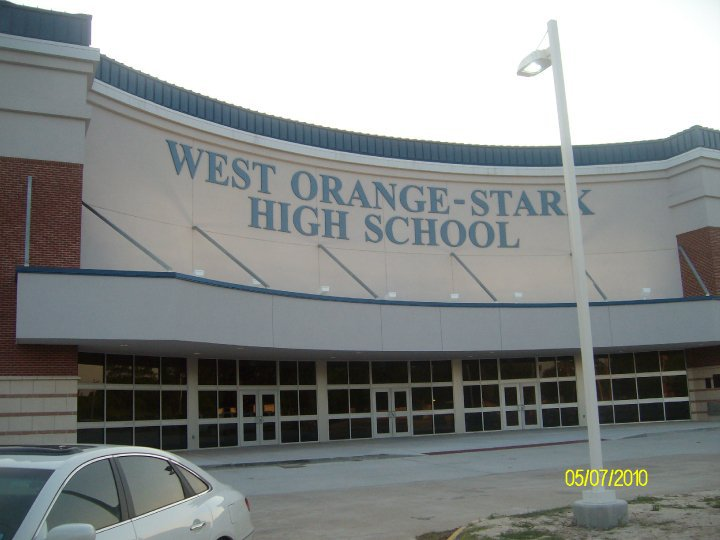
WOSHS (2010)

WO-C Alternative Center.

The new main entrance at WO-SHS and the WO-S Academic Alternative Center, which was scheduled to open in August 2011.

=== Schools ===
- MB North Early Learning Center (Pre-K & Head Start, Orange) LaKeisha Carter, Principal
- West Orange-Stark Elementary School (Grades K-5, Pinehurst) Vickie Oceguera, Principal
- West Orange-Stark Middle School (Grades 6–8, Orange) Caleb Henson, Principal
- West Orange-Stark High School (Grades 9–12, West Orange) Broderick McGrew, Principal
- West Orange-Stark Academic Alternative Center (Grades 6-12 DAEP, Orange) Chatana Battles, Coordinator (The Park st. campus officially opened its doors in August 2011. The Alternative School/Community Outreach Center will also be joined by the new Educational Service Center, as an effect of the 2011 Bond.)

Anderson Elem campus

Plan for Educ. Serv. Cntr

WO-S Elementary

Carl Godwin Auditorium.

WO-SES days after completion, July 2010, and the Carl Godwin Auditorium, before Summer 2010 repairs.

=== Administration Offices ===
- The Administration Building, which is located 902 W. Park, Orange, TX.
- Education Service Center, adjacent to Alternative Center. Former main Anderson campus, being renovated per 2011 Bond.
- Offices of the Superintendent, Curriculum, Student Services, Human Resources, Business Offices, Maintenance, Technology and Communication departments.

=== Carl Godwin Auditorium ===
Built adjacent to the original West Orange ISD School, the mid-20th century Carl A Godwin Auditorium was meant to make the West Orange ISD seem innovative. Named after the first fallen WWII soldier from the City of West Orange, it has been used for graduations, city meetings, board meetings, and performances (including one mid-1970s concert by celebrities Jack Greene and Jeannie Seely), until 2003, when West Orange-Cove declared it unusable due to damages from age. The funding for renovations for the auditorium came from the 2007 bond. Repairs were carried out by district maintenance crew. It reopened for school performances in December 2010.

=== Vacant Campuses ===
- Lorena Oates Campus, located in West Orange. Built in 1949, the campus closed in 2010, when its elementary level students were moved to the new facility. Currently awaiting auction.
- Anderson Campus, located in Orange. Built in the 1980s, it also closed when the new Elementary school opened. Adjacent to the Alternative Center, this building will soon house the all Administrative departments, excluding Maintenance/Warehouse, and Transportation, as a part of the 2011 Bond Project.

=== School Closures since 2000, and Bond Projects ===
- Jones Alternative/Parent Resource Center was closed in very early 2000s. It has been replaced by a facility housed at Anderson, as an effect of the 2011 Bond.
- WO-S Intermediate was closed in 2003, which left all 3 elementary schools with grades K-5, and the Middle School with grades 6–8.
- Upon the closure of Bancroft elementary in 2005–2006 school year, all 4th and 5th graders were to go to Lorena Oates Elementary, while all K-3rd students would go to Anderson.
- Both Lorena Oates, and Anderson Elementary closed in May 2010, as a part of the 2007 Bond. All elementary students now attend the new elementary school, which is the largest building in the county, at approx. 250,000 square feet (23,000 m^{2}).

==== 2003 Bond ====
The 2003 Bond projects consisted of two passed proposals - $5.3 million to refinance a Maintenance & Operations (M&O) tax loan to replace HVAC systems, and $7.2 million for facility repair & renovation. The bond was a Qualified Zone Academy Bond (QZAB) designed for high-poverty school districts, and charging no interest. The bond provided new roofs throughout the district, along with fencing, plumbing and restroom upgrades, door replacement, security and fire alarm system upgrades, and more. The projects were completed in their entirety by 2006. The loan was expected to be paid off by 2016.

==== 2007 Bond ====
As a part of the 2007 Bond, both the middle and high schools were renovated and expanded.

==== 2011 Bond ====
In May 2011 West Orange-Cove voters approved a low-interest federal stimulus bond for District advancement. The bond has provided funding for; replacing the track at West Orange-Stark High School, which had been unusable since 2005, and remodeling the Kindergarten wing of the former Anderson Elementary campus, converting it to the West Orange-Stark Academic Alternative Center. New playground equipment has been placed at West Orange-Stark Elementary, and all athletic facilities at West Orange-Stark High School have been updated, including a new tennis court, new fencing at the softball and baseball stadiums, and new restroom/concessions at Dan R. Hook Stadium. Projects that have yet to be completed are the renovation of the main campus at Anderson to a Community Outreach Facility, and the Administration Offices, which are currently housed in a building in a prime commercial area. Other projects planned include fencing around the Elementary school, new Heating/Ventilation/Air Conditioning systems in various areas throughout the district's school, an additional staff parking lot at West Orange-Stark Middle, and ADA modifications, where necessary. The funding, amounting to $6,075,000, will be paid back over 15-years. The district plans to sell the current administration building, and collect money in doing so.

== WO-CCISD administration ==
Superintendent of schools Dr. Alicia Sigee was hired by the board of trustees in May 2025.

=== Central administration ===
See Also West Orange-Cove Administration

- Dr. Alicia Sigee, superintendent of schools
- Dr. Sylvia Martinez, assistant superintendent of curriculum & instruction
- Melinda James, executive director of financial operations
- Christina Anderson, director of human resources
- Dr. Brant Graham, director of special education
- Dr. Wayne Guidry, director of federal programs, testing, & accountability
- Stephen Junious, director of communications
- Elvis Rushing, director of instructional technology
- Keisha Vicks, director of dining services – outsourced through Aramark K-12 Child Nutrition
- Sheila Navarre, director of transportation – outsourced through Student Transportation Specialists
- Greg Willis, director of maintenance & warehouse
- Hiawatha Hickman, director of athletics
- Jascelyn Tatum-Gause, coordinator of 21st Century Afterschool Programs on Education (ACE)
- Paul Thomas III, community liaison
- Shelley Trump, RN, health services manager

=== Board of Trustees ===
See Also West Orange-Cove Board Members

- Tricia Stroud, President
- Roderick Robertson, Vice-president
- Demetrius Hunter, Secretary
- Linda Platt-Bryant, Trustee
- Gina Yeaman, Trustee
- Donny Teate Jr., Trustee
- Tommy Wilson, Sr., Trustee

=== West Orange-Cove Education Foundation, Inc. ===
See Also West Orange-Cove Education Foundation

The WO-C Education Foundation was created in 2009. Since its creation, it has seen many donations from community members and companies alike.

Current & Past members include; Pete Amy, Jane Stephenson, Terese McKee, Doug Bready, Lois Bready, Sam Kittrell, Al Granger, Linn Cardner, Margaret Adams, Stephen Lee, Andrew Hayes, and Lorraine Shannon.

=== Former Administrators ===
The Public Schools of the Greater Orange Area have seen many administrators over the years. In the format of name, district(s) led, and first recorded year, some of the past superintendents include:

- J.W. Edgar, Orange ISD, 1941
- C.O. Chandler, Orange ISD, 1949
- Mildred Crawford, West Orange ISD, 1949
- Frank Hubert, Orange Public Schools, 1958
- Marlin L. Brockett, Orange Public Schools, 1960
- Thomas E. Huff, West Orange & West Orange-Cove Cons ISD, 1965
- Paul R. Willis, West Orange-Cove CISD, 1972
- Frank Kudlaty, West Orange-Cove CISD, 1979
- Dan McLendon, West Orange-Cove CISD, 1986
- L. Glen Neswick, West Orange-Cove CISD, 1996
- Don Jeffries, West Orange-Cove CISD, 1997
- Andrew Hayes, West Orange-Cove CISD, 2001
- Thomas Price, West Orange-Cove CISD, 2004
- O.T. Collins, West Orange-Cove CISD, 2005

== Academics and Non-Athletic Extra-Curriculars ==
The district has improved its state-mandated test scores by vast percentages over previous years. West Orange-Cove students excel at Academic UIL Competitions, including Math, Science, Journalism, and Writing.

The high school yearbook has received National Honors from Balfour|Taylor Publishing, the yearbook publishing company, for design, and on several occasions, from the ILPC. The Drama departments in both the Middle and High schools are highly successful in UIL competitions, as is the high school Choir. The high school Career Center has also won several Precision Machinist and Speed Skills championships. The Future Teachers of America chapter at WO-S High won State recognition as Advisor of the Year.

WO-C is the only area school district to implement complete band and music programs in all grades, K-12.

=== Accountability Ratings Since 1994 ===
- 1994-2001-Accredited
- 2002-Recognized
- 2003-No Data; TEA was revising system
- 2004-2008-Academically Acceptable
- 2009-Academically Unacceptable
- 2010-2011-Academically Acceptable
- 2012-No Data; TEA is revising accountability system

== Athletics ==
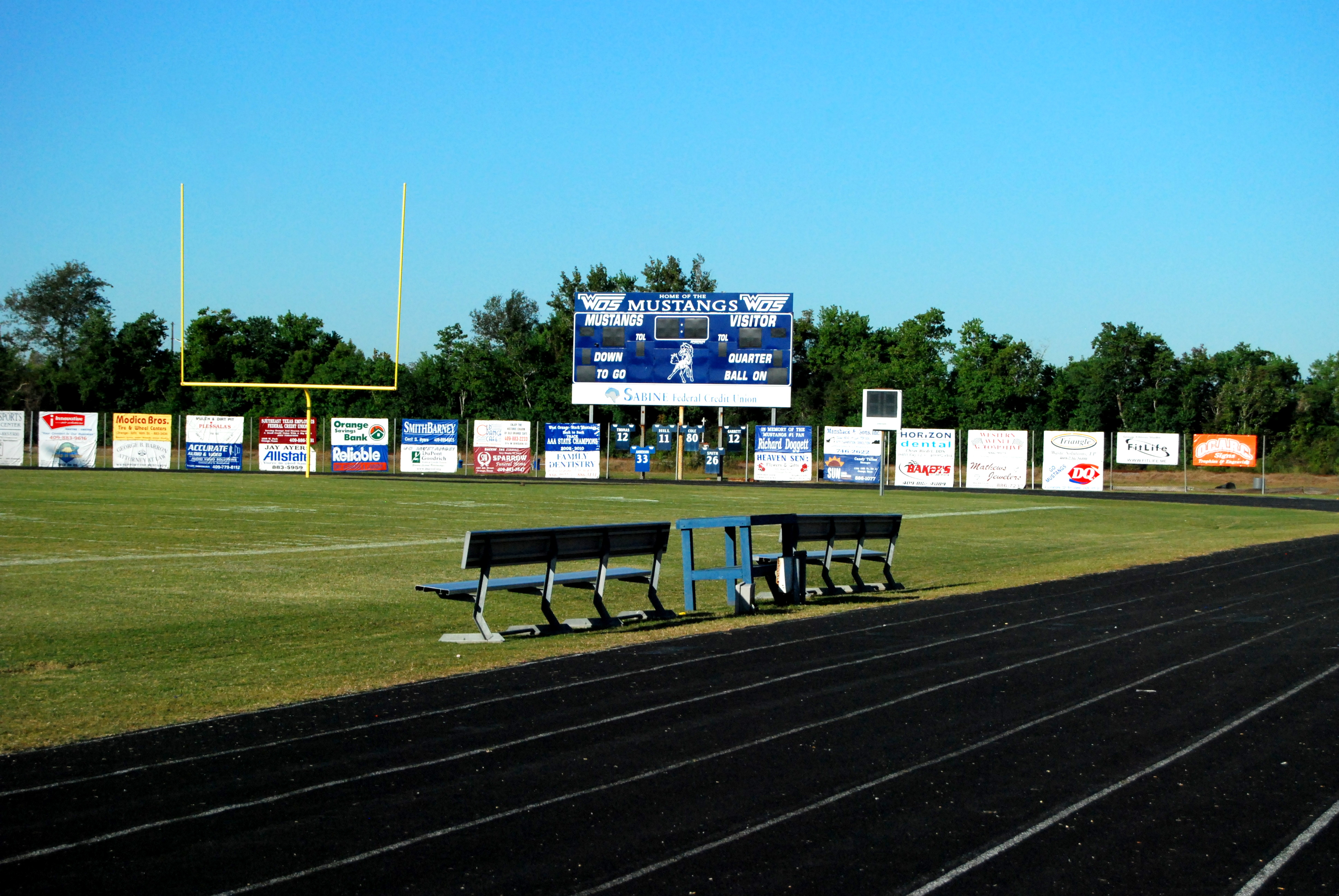
WO-CCISD's Dan R. Hooks Stadium

The district is known for many athletic achievements since its consolidation. This includes two consecutive football state championships, several state finals, and vast amounts of regional championships, belonging to both of the secondary schools. In 2009, 2010, and 2011 WO-C won state championships for track.

Dan R. Hooks, the former West Orange-Cove CISD director of athletics, announced his retirement in support of the leave incentive offered by the district, in spite of a minor budget shortfall. Hooks' last day was June 30, 2011, after over 30 years of service. The new director of athletics is longtime defensive coordinator Cornel Thompson.

== Other info ==
The district has a standardized dress code for the Head Start, elementary, alternative, middle school, and West Orange-Stark High School. These rules may be found in the Campus Handbooks.

The district was directly affected by Hurricane Ike, leaving NELC damaged by floods, and other district schools damaged in other ways.

The West Orange-Cove Consolidated Independent School District, in 2003 and 2005, along with Edgewood Independent School District (Bexar County, Texas), and Alvarado Independent School District, represented the districts of Texas, in attempts to declare the Texas school financial system, the Robin Hood plan, unconstitutional. The district has been invited to join a new movement of financial reformation of Texas' schools as of October 2011.

In 2005, following a huge food fight at the Middle School, Supt. of Schools O.T. Collins informed all Middle School employees that as of the end of the year, their contracts would not be renewed; but that they must reapply and be given back the position. This was mainly due to the reaction of the teachers during the lunchtime occurrence and several other problems during the year.

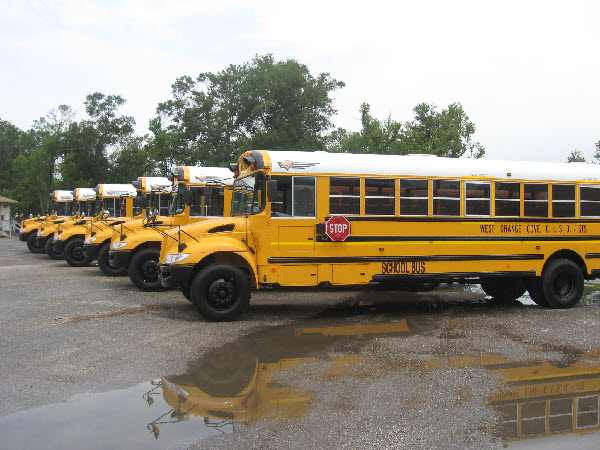
6 WO-C buses

In 2009, the district, and First Student (formerly Laidlaw) decided to cut after-school transportation from athletic events and practices. The district's board of trustees stated that this would save the district approximately $19,000.

In June 2009, the district got a bond to purchase 29 new school buses, to be owned by WOCCISD (previous buses were owned by Laidlaw/First Student). After purchasing the buses, WOCCISD dropped outsource company Laidlaw, and switched to managing-maintaining company STS.

In March 2010, the board of trustees decided to cut daycare programs at North Early Learning Center, which was costing them $21,000 a year. The district replaced it with an all-day preschool, in addition to the normal half-day preschool.

In April 2010, a robbery, assault, and homicide occurred within 100 feet (30 m) of the middle school, at Micky McNamara Insurance. The school immediately went into lockdown. Many WO-C administrative staff were present at the middle school to assist with the procedure, and later sending the students home. After the insurance agent was "LifeFlighted" away, all district buses were present at the school, should the need for emergency evacuation appear. Although evacuation wasn't necessary, early release did occur, and, with the assistance of the Orange Police Department, students safely left the school. One of the schools surveillance cameras that was facing the building and surrounding land was used to help find the suspect, and as evidence. The footage from the middle school camera was turned over to law enforcement by Dr. Collins, former Supt. of Schools, WO-C.

During a September 17, 2010, game, team quarterback Reginald Garrett walked to the sidelines and fell to the ground. It was rumored that he was having a seizure and also rumored that he had a history of seizures (his mother explained that he only had one seizure when he was three years old from a high fever and none since). While still conscious, he was removed from the field by paramedics. He was later pronounced dead at Memorial-Hermann Baptist Hospital - Orange. As the word of his death made its way across the stadium, fans poured out of Hooks Stadium to go visit the player's family at the hospital. The following two games were cancelled.

October 5, 2010, marked the release of the new WO-CCISD website release. The website was designed by Educational Networks Inc.

On November 4, 2010, Pinehurst Police began investigating a break in at the new West Orange-Stark Elementary School. The newly built school had no alarm system, and several computers were stolen. Interim Superintendent Bill Conway informed the media that the district learned of this when the school was completed, after O.T.Collins resigned, and ever since the district has been looking into surveillance and security systems. Since then, the school has installed an alarm system.

On March 23, 2011, one of the final products of a professional film crew was made available via the district website. The new WO-CCISD promotional video highlights aspects of each individual campus, students, staff, events, the community, and the district as a whole.

In early April 2011, the West Orange-Cove CISD Put up for auction the former Anderson campus' nine portable buildings, in a step to further offset deficit, and clean up the campus, in preparation for its use.

Due to an expected large budget cut from the state, and a very minor local shortfall, the West Orange-Cove CISD announced in March 2011 that it was offering an incentive for employees to leave the district, to save money. The incentive offered a leave bonus of 10% of the employees' salary. Amongst the names or retirees/resignees were Dan Hooks, longtime athletic director, and local 'Sports Legend', several Career Center staff, all of whom have been in the area and district for extremely long periods of time, and several other teachers.

Despite the problems that might be faced with over 50 teachers leaving, it was necessary. Most classrooms, according to Superintendent James Colbert, had very few students per block, creating the need for multiple same-subject teachers.

After the program ended, the district determined what positions needed to be refilled. Approximately 15 teachers were subsequently laid off. Some of those teachers were offered jobs at the Alternative Center.

After stricter and more enforced Dress Code requirements at the High School campus-the only school in the District that does not observe a standardized dress code-several students and parents spoke to board members at a regular meeting. The following day, Hutcherson Hill, campus principal, announced a committee of four high school students, several teachers and administrators, and one parent would be formed to make immediate changes to the Dress Code, and also to make overall Handbook changes later in the year. The Dress Code was reformatted and the new, less strict rules were in place two weeks later.

The district, following the reorganization implemented through the passing of the 2011 Bond, has slated several items and facilities for auction. After the successful auctioning of 9 portables at the former Anderson Campus, the district is planning to auction the closed Lorena Oates campus, 3 portables located at the high school campus, and several items and vehicles located in the warehouse.

Beginning in April 2012, district administration began the recommendation process with the board of trustees to terminate and non-renew several employee contracts, including an assistant principal, who announced his retirement at the board meeting deciding his fate. Reasons cited included performance evaluation data.

In July 2012, the board of trustees switched outsourced food service companies from Chartwells to Aramark.

=== Enrollment ===
At the turn of the 21st century, WO-CCISD had approximately 3,900 students. As of August 2010, the district serves only 2,550. The majority of the decrease in pupils occurred during Andrew Hayes' duration as superintendent, but isn't necessarily an effect of Hayes assuming that title. In 2004, the district dropped to UIL-level AAA. Enrollment fluctuated after Hurricane Katrina, increasing well over 500 students, yet after Hurricane Rita, just one month later, enrollment was at a new low. Since 2005, the district has dropped approximately 100 students per year. Attempts to increase enrollment have failed, whether it be from more strict discipline measures, Open Enrollment, or setting academic goals. Lack of valuable property in the districts boundaries could be the issue.

September 3, 2010 marked the first increase in enrollment in years. The district had 22 more students than they did the last day of May 2010. Bill Conway, then interim superintendent, said the following;

It is encouraging after 10 days of school that we are 22 students ahead of where we ended last year and four students ahead of where we were at this time last year. This is a good indication of growth in enrollment for our district.

=== Ethnic Diversity ===
The district, as of 2007, was awarded Best in State for African Americans, as awarded by Texas A&M University. The study included 3 years of data. The ethnic makeup of the district includes people of many ethnicities.
