= West Orange, Texas =

- City
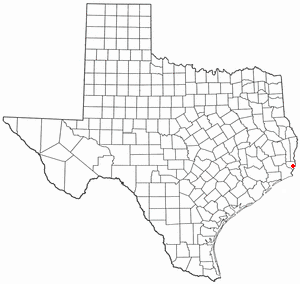
- Location of West Orange in Texas

- Location of West Orange in Orange County, Texas
- Coordinates: 30°04′44″N 93°45′13″W
- Country: United States
- State: Texas
- County: Orange

Area
  - Total: 3.42 sq mi (8.86 km^{2})
  - Land: 3.40 sq mi (8.81 km^{2})
  - Water: 0.019 sq mi (0.05 km^{2})
- Elevation: 10 ft (3.0 m)

Population (2020)
  - Total: 3,459
  - Density: 947.7/sq mi (365.91/km^{2})
- Time zone: UTC-6 (Central (CST))
  - Summer (DST): UTC-5 (CDT)
- ZIP Code: 77630
- Area code: 409
- FIPS code: 48-77752
- GNIS feature ID: 2412225
- Website: www.westorangetx.gov

West Orange is a city in Orange County, Texas, United States. The population was 3,459 at the 2020 census, an increase over the figure of 3,443 tabulated in 2010. It is part of the Beaumont–Port Arthur Metropolitan Statistical Area.

== Geography ==
According to the U.S. Census Bureau, the city has a total area of 3.5 square miles (9.1 km^{2}), of which 3.5 square miles (9.1 km^{2}) is land and 0.05 square miles (0.13 km^{2}) (0.95%) is water.

== Demographics ==
Historical population
Census	Pop.	Note	%±
1960	4,848		—
1970	4,820		−0.6%
1980	4,610		−4.4%
1990	4,187		−9.2%
2000	4,111		−1.8%
2010	3,443		−16.2%
2020	3,459		0.5%
U.S. Decennial Census

=== 2020 census ===
As of the 2020 census, West Orange had a population of 3,459, and the median age was 39.9 years. 23.8% of residents were under the age of 18 and 18.7% of residents were 65 years of age or older. For every 100 females there were 96.9 males, and for every 100 females age 18 and over there were 95.3 males age 18 and over.

100.0% of residents lived in urban areas, while 0.0% lived in rural areas.

There were 1,427 households in West Orange, of which 28.9% had children under the age of 18 living in them. Of all households, 39.8% were married-couple households, 22.4% were households with a male householder and no spouse or partner present, and 30.6% were households with a female householder and no spouse or partner present. About 29.7% of all households were made up of individuals and 12.2% had someone living alone who was 65 years of age or older.

There were 1,654 housing units, of which 13.7% were vacant. The homeowner vacancy rate was 2.9% and the rental vacancy rate was 12.8%.

Racial composition as of the 2020 census
Race	Number	Percent
White	2,365	68.4%
Black or African American	445	12.9%
American Indian and Alaska Native	38	1.1%
Asian	41	1.2%
Native Hawaiian and Other Pacific Islander	0	0.0%
Some other race	283	8.2%
Two or more races	287	8.3%
Hispanic or Latino (of any race)	575	16.6%

=== 2000 census ===
As of the 2000 census, there were 4,111 people, 1,672 households, and 1,183 families residing in the city. The population density was 1,297.5 inhabitants per square mile (501.0/km^{2}). There were 1,876 housing units at an average density of 592.1 per square mile (228.6/km^{2}). The racial makeup of the city was 92.92% White, 1.85% African American, 0.34% Native American, 0.61% Asian, 2.38% from other races, and 1.90% from two or more races. Hispanic or Latino of any race were 5.77% of the population.

There were 1,672 households, out of which 30.3% had children under the age of 18 living with them, 52.7% were married couples living together, 12.8% had a female householder with no husband present, and 29.2% were non-families. 25.8% of all households were made up of individuals, and 12.3% had someone living alone who was 65 years of age or older. The average household size was 2.46 and the average family size was 2.92.

In West Orange, the population was spread out, with 24.5% under the age of 18, 8.6% from 18 to 24, 27.7% from 25 to 44, 21.6% from 45 to 64, and 17.6% who were 65 years of age or older. The median age was 37 years. For every 100 females, there were 94.8 males. For every 100 females age 18 and over, there were 91.1 males.

The median income for a household in the city was $32,224, and the median income for a family was $40,167. Males had a median income of $35,225 versus $19,286 for females. The per capita income for the city was $15,850. About 11.2% of families and 13.2% of the population were below the poverty line, including 14.3% of those under age 18 and 15.9% of those age 65 or over.

== Education ==
West Orange is served by two school districts. Areas east of State Highway 87 are part of the West Orange-Cove Consolidated Independent School District (which make up almost all of the municipality) and areas to the west of State Highway 87 are part of the Bridge City Independent School District.
