= 1981 All-Southwest Conference football team =

American college football all-star team

The 1981 All-Southwest Conference football team consists of American football players from the Southwest Conference (SWC) who were chosen as the best at their respective positions during the 1981 NCAA Division I-A football season. The official All-Southwest Conference teams in 1981 were chosen by votes of the conference's head football coaches for the Associated Press.

== Honorees by team ==
1981 Southwest Conference football standings
| | Conf. | | | | | Overall |
| Team | W | | L | | T | W | | L | | T |
|---|---|---|---|---|---|---|---|---|---|---|
| No. 5 SMU $ | 7 | – | 1 | – | 0 | 10 | – | 1 | – | 0 |
| No. 2 Texas | 6 | – | 1 | – | 1 | 10 | – | 1 | – | 1 |
| Houston | 5 | – | 2 | – | 1 | 7 | – | 4 | – | 1 |
| Arkansas | 5 | – | 3 | – | 0 | 8 | – | 4 | – | 0 |
| Texas A&M | 4 | – | 4 | – | 0 | 7 | – | 5 | – | 0 |
| Rice | 3 | – | 5 | – | 0 | 4 | – | 7 | – | 0 |
| Baylor | 3 | – | 5 | – | 0 | 5 | – | 6 | – | 0 |
| TCU | 1 | – | 6 | – | 1 | 2 | – | 7 | – | 2 |
| Texas Tech | 0 | – | 7 | – | 1 | 1 | – | 9 | – | 1 |
$ – Conference champion; Rankings from AP Poll

SMU. The SMU Mustangs won the SWC championship and placed its full backfield on the All-Southwest Conference first team: running backs Eric Dickerson and Craig James and quarterback Lance McIlhenny. Seven other SMU players were also named to the first team: offensive guard Perry Hartnett, defensive tackle Harvey Armstrong, linebackers Eric Ferguson and Gary Moten, defensive backs Russell Carter and James Mobley, and kicker Eddie Garcia. Dickerson was named the SWC offensive player of the year and Ron Meyer was chosen as the SWC Coach of the year.

Texas. The Texas Longhorns finished second in the SWC and were ranked No. 2 in the final AP poll. Defensive end Kenneth Sims was selected as the SWC defensive player of the year. Sims and six other Texas players were selected by either the coaches of the UPI to the first team: guard Joe Shearin, tackle Terry Tausch, center Mike Babb, defensive end Kenneth Sims, linebackers Bruce Scholtz and Doug Shankle, and punter Maury Buford.

Houston. The Houston Cougars finished in third place and placed six on the All-SWC team: tight end Mark Ford; wide receiver Lonell Phea; tackle Maceo Fifer; defensive lineman Terry Monroe; linebacker Grady Turner; and defensive back Butch LaCroix.

Arkansas. The Arkansas Razorbacks finished fourth in the SWC and compiled an 8–4 record under head coach Lou Holtz. The Razorbacks two players on the first team: defensive lineman Billy Ray Smith and guard Steve Korte. Brad Taylor was selected as the SWC newcomer of the year.

Texas A&M. The Texas A&M Aggies finished fifth in the SWC and placed zero players on the first team but eight on the second team, including quarterback Gary Kubiak and running back Earnest Jackson, and wide receiver Mike Whitwell.

Rice. Rice played no players on the first team and two on the second team.

Baylor. The Baylor Bears tied for sixth and placed two players on the first team: wide receiver Gerald McNeil and defensive lineman Charles Benson. Four others, including running back Walter Abercrombie, were named to the second team.

TCU. The TCU Horned Frogs finished eighth and placed wide receiver Stanley Washington on the first team. In addition, linebacker Gary Spann was chosen as the SWC defensive newcomer of the year.

Texas Tech. The Texas Tech Red Raiders placed punter Maury Buford on the first team.

== Offensive selections ==
=== Quarterbacks ===
- Lance McIlhenny, SMU (Coaches-1, UPI-1)
- Gary Kubiak, Texas A&M (Coaches-2)
- Michael Calhoun, Rice (UPI-2)

=== Running backs ===
- Eric Dickerson, SMU (Coaches-1, UPI-1)
- Craig James, SMU (Coaches-1, UPI-1)
- Walter Abercrombie, Baylor (Coaches-2, UPI-2)
- Earnest Jackson, Texas A&M (Coaches-2)
- A. J. Jones, Texas (UPI-2)

=== Tight ends ===
- Mark Ford, Houston (Coaches-1, UPI-1)
- Darryl Mason, Arkansas (Coaches-2, UPI-2)

=== Wide receivers ===
- Stanley Washington, TCU (Coaches-1, UPI-1)
- Gerald McNeil, Baylor (Coaches-1, UPI-1)
- Lonell Phea, Houston (Coaches-2, UPI-1)
- Mike Whitwell, Texas A&M (Coaches-2)
- Hosea Fortune, Rice (UPI-2)

=== Guards ===
- Perry Hartnett, SMU (Coaches-1, UPI-1)
- Joe Shearin, Texas (Coaches-2, UPI-1)
- Steve Korte, Arkansas (Coaches-1, UPI-2)
- Doug Dawson, Texas (Coaches-2)
- Mark Kirchner, Baylor (UPI-2)

=== Tackles ===
- Maceo Fifer, Houston (Coaches-1, UPI-1)
- Terry Tausch, Texas (Coaches-1, UPI-1)
- Alfred Mohammed, Arkansas (Coaches-2, UPI-2)
- Tommy Robison, Texas A&M (Coaches-2)
- Bobby Glass, Baylor (UPI-2)

=== Centers ===
- Mike Babb, Texas (Coaches-1, UPI-1)
- Jay Bequette, Arkansas (Coaches-2)
- Gordon McAdams, SMU (UPI-2)

== Defensive selections ==
=== Defensive linemen ===
- Kenneth Sims, Texas (Coaches-1, UPI-1 [DT])
- Harvey Armstrong, SMU (Coaches-1, UPI-1 [DT])
- Billy Ray Smith, Arkansas (Coaches-1, UPI-1 [DE])
- Terry Monroe, Houston (Coaches-1)
- Charles Benson, Baylor (Coaches-1, UPI-1 [DE])
- Keith Baldwin, Texas A&M (Coaches-2)
- Keith Guthrie, Texas A&M (Coaches-2, UPI-2 [DT])
- Kiki DeAyala, Texas (Coaches-2, UPI-2)
- Leo Truss, Houston (Coaches-2)
- Gabe Rivera, Texas Tech (Coaches-2)
- Russell Washington, SMU (UPI-2 [DE])
- Tommy Tabor, Baylor (UPI-2 [DT])

=== Linebackers ===
- Grady Turner, Houston (Coaches-2, UPI-1)
- Bruce Scholtz, Texas (Coaches-1)
- Eric Ferguson, SMU (Coaches-1, UPI-2)
- Bobby Strogen, Texas A&M (Coaches-2)
- Doug Shankle, Texas (UPI-1)
- Gary Moten, SMU (UPI-1)
- Richard Richardson, Arkansas (UPI-2)
- Mike Little, Texas A&M (UPI-2)

=== Defensive secondary ===
- Butch LaCroix, Houston (Coaches-1, UPI-1)
- Vann McElroy, Baylor (Coaches-1, UPI-1)
- Russell Carter, SMU (Coaches-1, UPI-1)
- James Mobley, SMU (Coaches-1, UPI-1)
- Tate Randle, Texas Tech (Coaches-2)
- Vance Bedford, Texas (Coaches-2, UPI-2)
- Donnie Love, Houston (Coaches-2, UPI-2)
- Bobby Johnson, Texas (Coaches-2)
- William Graham, Texas (UPI-2)
- Wes Hopkins, SMU (UPI-2)

== Special teams ==
=== Placekicker ===
- Eddie Garcia, SMU (Coaches-1, UPI-1)
- Bruce Lahay, Arkansas (UPI-2)

=== Punter ===
- Maury Buford, Texas Tech (Coaches-1, UPI-1)
- John Goodson, Texas (UPI-2)

== Players of the year ==
- Offensive player of the year: Eric Dickerson, running back, SMU (Coaches, UPI)
- Defensive player of the year: Kenneth Sims, lineman, Texas (Coaches, UPI)
- Coach of the year: Ron Meyer, SMU (Coaches, UPI)
- Newcomer of the year: Brad Taylor, Arkansas (UPI)
- Offensive newcomer of the year: Brad Taylor, Arkansas (Coaches)
- Defensive newcomer of the year: Gary Spann, TCU (Coaches)

== Key ==
Coaches = selected by Southwest Conference coaches

UPI -

== See also ==
1981 All-America college football team
