= 1979 All-Southwest Conference football team =

American college football all-star team

The 1979 All-Southwest Conference football team consists of American football players chosen by various organizations for All-Southwest Conference teams for the 1979 NCAA Division I-A football season. The selectors for the 1979 season included the Southwest conference coaches (the "Coaches" team).

== Offensive selections ==
=== Quarterbacks ===
- Kevin Scanlon, Arkansas (Coaches-1)
- Mike Mosley, Texas A&M (Coaches-2)

=== Running backs ===
- James Hadnot, Texas Tech (Coaches-1)
- A.J. "Jam" Jones, Texas (Coaches-1)
- Earl Cooper, Rice (Coaches-2)
- Walter Abercrombie, Baylor (Coaches-2) (tie)
- Terald Clark, Houston (Coaches-2) (tie)

=== Tight ends ===
- Lawrence Sampleton, Texas (Coaches-1)
- Garrett Jurgajtis, Houston (Coaches-2)

=== Wide receivers ===
- Robert Farrell, Arkansas (Coaches-1)
- Johnny "Lam" Jones, Texas (Coaches-1)
- Emanuel Tolbert, SMU (Coaches-2)
- Gerald Carter, Texas A&M (Coaches-2)

=== Guards ===
- George Stewart, Arkansas (Coaches-1)
- Bill Glass, Baylor (Coaches-1)
- Frank Ditts, Baylor (Coaches-2)
- Danile Greenwalt, Houston (Coaches-2)

=== Tackles ===
- Greg Kolenda, Arkansas (Coaches-1)
- Melvin Jones, Houston (Coaches-1)
- Terry Tausch, Texas (Coaches-2)
- Craig Rider, Texas (Coaches-2)

=== Centers ===
- Wes Hubert, Texas (Coaches-1)
- Lance Pederson, SMU (Coaches-2)

== Defensive selections ==
=== Defensive Linemen ===
- Jacob Green, Texas A&M (Coaches-1)
- Leonard Mitchell, Houston (Coaches-1)
- Steve McMichael, Texas (Coaches-1)
- Hosea Taylor, Houston (Coaches-1)
- Andrew Melontree, Baylor (Coaches-2)
- Bill Acker, Texas (Coaches-2)
- Gary Don Johnson, Baylor (Coaches-2)
- Wesley Roberts, TCU (Coaches-2) (tie)
- Harvey Armstrong, SMU (Coaches-2) (tie)

=== Linebackers ===
- David Hodge, Houston (Coaches-1)
- Doug Shankle, Texas (Coaches-1)
- Mike Singletary, Baylor (Coaches-1)
- Mike Massey, Arkansas (Coaches-2)
- Doug Carr, Texas A&M (Coaches-2)
- Robin Sendlein, Texas (Coaches-2)
- Johnny Quinney, Texas Tech (Coaches-2)

=== Defensive backs ===
- Derrick Hatchett, Texas (Coaches-1)
- Johnnie Johnson, Texas (Coaches-1)
- Ricky Churchman, Texas (Coaches-1)
- Ted Watts, Texas Tech (Coaches-1)
- Elvis Bradley, Houston (Coaches-2)
- Chris Judge, TCU (Coaches-2)
- Vance Bedford, Texas (Coaches-2)
- Kevin Evans, Arkansas (Coaches-2)

== Special teams ==
=== Placekicker ===
- Ish Ordonez, Arkansas (Coaches-1)

=== Punter ===
- Steve Cox, Arkansas (Coaches-1)

== Miscellaneous ==
- Offensive Player of the Year: Kevin Scanlon, Arkansas (Coaches)
- Defensive Player of the Year: Mike Singletary, Baylor (Coaches)
- Coach of the Year: Lou Holtz, Arkansas (Coaches)
- Offensive Newcomers of the Year: Gary Anderson, Arkansas and Johnny Hector, Texas A&M (Coaches)
- Defensive Newcomer of the Year: Darrell Patterson, Texas (Coaches)
- Conference co-champions: Arkansas Razorbacks and Houston Cougars

== Key ==
Coaches = selected by Southwest Conference coaches

== See also ==
1979 College Football All-America Team
