= 1981 Texas A&M Aggies football team =

American college football season

1981 Texas A&M Aggies football

Independence Bowl champion

Independence Bowl, W 33–16 vs. Oklahoma State
- Conference: Southwest Conference
- Record: 7–5 (4–4 SWC)
- Head coach: Tom Wilson (4th season)
- Home stadium: Kyle Field

1981 Southwest Conference football standings
	Conf.					Overall
Team	W		L		T	W		L		T
No. 5 SMU $	7	–	1	–	0	10	–	1	–	0
No. 2 Texas	6	–	1	–	1	10	–	1	–	1
Houston	5	–	2	–	1	7	–	4	–	1
Arkansas	5	–	3	–	0	8	–	4	–	0
Texas A&M	4	–	4	–	0	7	–	5	–	0
Rice	3	–	5	–	0	4	–	7	–	0
Baylor	3	–	5	–	0	5	–	6	–	0
TCU	1	–	6	–	1	2	–	7	–	2
Texas Tech	0	–	7	–	1	1	–	9	–	1
$ – Conference champion; Rankings from AP Poll

The 1981 Texas A&M Aggies football team represented Texas A&M University in the 1981 NCAA Division I-A football season as a member of the Southwest Conference (SWC). The Aggies were led by head coach Tom Wilson in his fourth season and finished with a record of seven wins and five losses (7–5 overall, 4–4 in the SWC) and with a victory in the Independence Bowl.

Despite the winning record and bowl victory, Wilson was fired. The dual role of head coach and athletic director--Wilson was not named AD when his predecessor, Emory Bellard, resigned as head coach and AD in October 1978--was first offered to Michigan's Bo Schembechler, who did not hold the administrative role with the Wolverines at the time. Schembechler declined, and the Aggies hired Pitt's Jackie Sherrill.

== Schedule ==
Date	Opponent	Site	Result	Attendance	Source
September 5	at California*	California Memorial Stadium; Berkeley, CA	W 29–28	33,751	
September 19	at Boston College*	Alumni Stadium; Chestnut Hill, MA	L 12–13	31,000	
September 26	Louisiana Tech*	Kyle Field; College Station, TX	W 43–7	56,217	
October 3	at Texas Tech	Jones Stadium; Lubbock, TX (rivalry)	W 24–23	50,081	
October 10	Houston	Kyle Field; College Station, TX	W 7–6	66,569	
October 17	at Baylor	Baylor Stadium; Waco, TX (Battle of the Brazos)	L 17–19	45,000	
October 24	at Rice	Rice Stadium; Houston, TX	W 51–26	52,000	
October 31	No. 13 SMU	Kyle Field; College Station, TX	L 7–27	62,646	
November 14	No. 16 Arkansas	Kyle Field; College Station, TX (rivalry)	L 7–10	60,003	
November 21	at TCU	Amon G. Carter Stadium; Fort Worth, TX (rivalry)	W 37–7	29,483	
November 26	No. 7 Texas	Kyle Field; College Station, TX (rivalry)	L 13–21	71,731	
December 12	vs. Oklahoma State*	Independence Stadium; Shreveport, LA (Independence Bowl)	W 33–16	48,600	
*Non-conference game; Rankings from AP Poll released prior to the game

== Roster ==
1981 Texas A&M Aggies football team roster
Players
Coaches
Offense

Pos.	#	Name	Class
RB	32	Johnny Hector	Jr
QB	16	Gary Kubiak	Jr
WR	25	Mike Whitwell	Sr

Defense

Pos.	#	Name	Class
DE	80	Keith Baldwin	Sr
SS	37	Jeff Fuller	So
DT	74	Keith Guthrie	Jr

Special teams

Pos.	#	Name	Class
K	3	David Hardy	Jr

Head coach

- Tom Wilson

Coordinators/assistant coaches

Legend

- (C) Team captain
- (S) Suspended
- (I) Ineligible
- Injured
- Redshirt
