= Barret Robbins =

American football player (1973–2026)

No. 63
- Position: Center

Personal information
- Born: August 26, 1973; Houston, Texas, U.S.
- Died: March 26, 2026 (aged 52)
- Listed height: 6 ft 3 in (1.91 m)
- Listed weight: 320 lb (145 kg)

Career information
- High school: Sharpstown (Houston)
- College: TCU (1991–1994)
- NFL draft: 1995: 2nd round, 49th overall pick

Career history
- Oakland Raiders (1995–2003)

Awards and highlights
- First-team All-Pro (2002); Pro Bowl (2002); First-team All-SWC (1994)

Career NFL statistics
- Games played: 121
- Games started: 105
- Fumble recoveries: 3
- Stats at Pro Football Reference

Barret Glenn Robbins (August 26, 1973 – March 26, 2026) was an American professional football player who was a center for nine seasons with the Oakland Raiders of the National Football League (NFL). After playing college football for the TCU Horned Frogs, he was taken by the Raiders in the second round of the 1995 NFL draft. He was elected to the Pro Bowl in 2002.

== College career ==
Robbins attended Texas Christian University, where he played for the Horned Frogs. As a senior in 1994, he was named first-team All-Southwest Conference. TCU played in the 1994 Independence Bowl, their first postseason game in a decade. While in college, Robbins was diagnosed with depression and anxiety, and he was hospitalized during a psychotic episode.

== Professional career ==
Pre-draft measurables
Height	Weight	Arm length	Hand span	40-yard dash	10-yard split	20-yard split	20-yard shuttle	Vertical jump
6 ft 2 7/8 in (1.90 m)	310 lb (141 kg)	31 1/4 in (0.79 m)	9 1/4 in (0.23 m)	5.40 s	1.92 s	3.10 s	4.62 s	24.5 in (0.62 m)

Robbins was selected by the Los Angeles Raiders in the second round of the 1995 NFL draft, with the 49th overall pick.

In 1996, Mike White's last year as head coach, the second-year Robbins replaced Dan Turk in the lineup, becoming only the fifth starting center in Raider history, after Turk, Don Mosebar, Dave Dalby, and Jim Otto. The first sign of his mental health problems turned up during the season when he was found disoriented and wandering around the team hotel in Denver shortly before a game with the Denver Broncos. Robbins missed that game and was hospitalized.

During the 2000 NFL season with Jon Gruden as head coach and Rich Gannon at quarterback, Oakland scored 479 points (29.9 points/game), 3rd of 31 teams in the NFL, thanks to a strong offensive line which included Robbins playing between Steve Wisniewski at left guard and Mo Collins at right guard in all 16 games (also both playoff games), finishing with a won-lost record of 12–4 and an AFC West title. In the divisional round of the 2000–01 NFL playoffs, Oakland shut out the Miami Dolphins 27–0, gaining 140 yards on the ground. An early sign of Robbins' future trouble was displayed when he went missing a week before the AFC championship game, though in this case he did show up 24 hours before the game started and played in the Raiders 16–3 loss to the Baltimore Ravens.

During the 2001 NFL season, Robbins was injured, playing in only two regular season games, replaced by Adam Treu (also in both playoff games), when Oakland scored 399 points (24.9 points/game), 4th of 31 teams in the NFL, and won the AFC west again with a 10–6 record, defeating the New York Jets in a wildcard game but losing to the New England Patriots in the divisional round, in controversial fashion (see Tuck Rule Game).

In the 2002 NFL season with Bill Callahan in his first year as head coach, Robbins rebounded strongly by starting all 16 regular season games and making the Pro Bowl. Oakland won the AFC west for the third straight year, with an 11–5 record, scoring 450 points (28.1 points/game), 2nd of 32 teams in the NFL. In the 2002–03 NFL playoffs, the Raiders defeated the New York Jets again with 399 total yards, with an offensive line composed of Robbins, Frank Middleton and Mo Collins at guard, Barry Sims and Lincoln Kennedy at tackle. The Raiders then beat with the same offensive line the Tennessee Titans in the AFC championship game, gaining 375 total yards.

Then, the day before Super Bowl XXXVII, Robbins was reported as missing for most of the day before the game after not taking his depression medication. When he resurfaced that night, he was so incoherent that he didn't even know where he was. According to one of his teammates, Robbins didn't even recognize Callahan. Despite this, Al Davis still wanted Robbins in the game, and development coach Willie Brown had Robbins running sprints in the parking lot on the morning of the game to see if he could still play.

Callahan had initially intended to let Robbins play, but not start. However, he ultimately decided to suspend Robbins for the game after concluding that he was not fit to take the field at all. He initially wanted to fly Robbins back to Oakland, but was unable to get him a plane ticket because he was missing his wallet and identification. He spent 30 days at the Betty Ford Center, during which time he was diagnosed with bipolar disorder (or manic-depressive disorder). He'd been diagnosed with depression while at TCU, but it is common for the two to be confused in the early stages. It turned out that he had gone into a manic episode after not taking his medication. According to his wife, Robbins spent most of the day before the Super Bowl partying across the border in Tijuana, Mexico; he had thought the Raiders already won the game and he was celebrating their "victory." With Adam Treu as the starting center, the Raiders were blown out in an ugly loss in the Super Bowl to the Tampa Bay Buccaneers, 48–21.

Robbins regained his starting job the next year in the 2003 NFL season with the same linemates, a disastrous 4–12 for the team. However, his name and those of several of his teammates were found on the list of clients of the Bay Area Laboratory Co-operative that had given performance-enhancing drugs to Marion Jones and others. The Raiders released him in the summer of 2004 after he tested positive for "the clear," a steroid known to have come from the BALCO lab. Treu replaced him as the starting center.

== Post-football troubles ==
A few months later, on Christmas Eve of 2004, Robbins was arrested for punching a security guard who tried to keep him from going to a bar at the Sir Francis Drake Hotel in San Francisco. On January 15, 2005, Robbins was shot three times during a brawl with police in Miami Beach, and was subsequently charged with attempted murder for his role. Under a plea agreement, Robbins pleaded guilty to five charges, including the attempted murder charge, and was sentenced to five years' probation, ordered to receive treatment for his bipolar disorder, and to avoid alcohol. He spent years in jail or in rehab facilities due to problems with substance abuse. He ultimately ended up in a rehab facility in Houston in 2008, and was transferred to a halfway house in May 2009.

In a 2009 interview with HBO's Real Sports, Robbins told Andrea Kremer that before being diagnosed as bipolar, he had dealt with his mood swings by taking alcohol, cocaine, marijuana, and steroids. He also said that he had been in a manic mood for both Raider playoff games prior to the Super Bowl. His ex-wife, Marisa, also interviewed for the story, said that before the diagnosis there were days where he had breakfast and went right back to bed.

In early 2010, a police officer pulled him over near Dallas and found crack cocaine in his car. On March 25, 2011, Robbins was sentenced to five years in a Florida prison for a drug-related probation violation and was released on September 25, 2012.

In August 2016, Robbins was alleged to have punched a mother and her daughter in Boca Raton, Florida, resulting in his arrest and two subsequent charges of felony battery before being sent to a mental health facility.

In November 2020, Robbins was accused of leaving a restaurant in Delray Beach, Florida, without paying for his meal. A restaurant employee followed Robbins as he fled the restaurant on foot. During the altercation, Robbins allegedly threw a rock at the restaurant employee. Delray Beach Police were called and Robbins was taken into custody.

== Death ==
Robbins died on March 26, 2026, at the age of 52.

== See also ==
- List of doping cases in sport
