= Brad Taylor (disambiguation) =

Brad Taylor may refer to:

- Brad Taylor (born 1997), English cricketer
- Brad Taylor (Canadian football) (born 1962), American player of Canadian football
- Brad Taylor (Home Improvement), TV series character
