= 1981 SMU Mustangs football team =

American college football season

1981 SMU Mustangs football

Co-national champion (NCF) SWC champion
- Conference: Southwest Conference

Ranking
- AP: No. 5
- Record: 10–1 (7–1 SWC)
- Head coach: Ron Meyer (6th season)
- Offensive scheme: Option
- Defensive coordinator: Steve Sidwell (6th season)
- Base defense: 3–4
- Home stadium: Texas Stadium

1981 Southwest Conference football standings
	Conf.					Overall
Team	W		L		T	W		L		T
No. 5 SMU $	7	–	1	–	0	10	–	1	–	0
No. 2 Texas	6	–	1	–	1	10	–	1	–	1
Houston	5	–	2	–	1	7	–	4	–	1
Arkansas	5	–	3	–	0	8	–	4	–	0
Texas A&M	4	–	4	–	0	7	–	5	–	0
Rice	3	–	5	–	0	4	–	7	–	0
Baylor	3	–	5	–	0	5	–	6	–	0
TCU	1	–	6	–	1	2	–	7	–	2
Texas Tech	0	–	7	–	1	1	–	9	–	1
$ – Conference champion; Rankings from AP Poll

The 1981 SMU Mustangs football team represented Southern Methodist University (SMU) as a member of the Southwest Conference (SWC) during the 1981 NCAA Division I-A football season. Led by Ron Meyer in his sixth and final season as head coach, the Mustangs compiled an overall record 10–1 with a mark of 7–1 in conference play, winning the SWC title.

The Mustangs had been put on probation by the NCAA for recruiting violations and were banned from participating in any bowl game in 1981. Since SMU's performance would have given them an automatic berth in the Cotton Bowl Classic, the team decided to treat its final regular season game at Arkansas as their bowl game and nicknamed it the "Polyester Bowl". SMU defeated the Razorbacks 32–18.

SMU finished at No. 5 in the final AP Poll. Because its rules prevent schools under probation from being considered, the Mustangs were not ranked in the Coaches Poll at all during the season. At season's end, the Mustangs were recognized as one of five co-national champions by the National Championship Foundation (NCF).

The team's offense scored 365 points while the defense allowed 137 points.

== Schedule ==
Date	Opponent	Rank	Site	Result	Attendance	Source
September 5	UT Arlington*		Texas Stadium; Irving, TX	W 48–0	20,130	
September 12	North Texas State*		Texas Stadium; Irving, TX (rivalry)	W 34–7	20,400	
September 19	Grambling State*		Texas Stadium; Irving, TX	W 59–27	45,700	
September 26	at TCU	No. 20	Amon G. Carter Stadium; Fort Worth, TX (rivalry)	W 20–9	25,862	
October 10	Baylor	No. 14	Texas Stadium; Irving, TX	W 37–20	33,110	
October 17	at Houston	No. 10	Houston Astrodome; Houston, TX (rivalry)	W 38–22	36,892	
October 24	No. 10 Texas	No. 8	Texas Stadium; Irving, TX	L 7–9	62,777	
October 31	at Texas A&M	No. 13	Kyle Field; College Station, TX	W 27–7	62,646	
November 7	Rice	No. 10	Texas Stadium; Irving, TX (rivalry)	W 33–12	28,750	
November 14	Texas Tech	No. 8	Texas Stadium; Irving, TX	W 30–6	24,410	
November 21	at No. 16 Arkansas	No. 6	Razorback Stadium; Fayetteville, AR	W 32–18	43,842	
*Non-conference game; Rankings from AP Poll released prior to the game

== Roster ==
1981 SMU Mustangs football team roster
Players
Coaches
Offense

Pos.	#	Name	Class
RB	19	Eric Dickerson	Jr
FB	28	Charles Drayton	Jr
OL	77	Perry Hartnett	Sr
RB	32	Craig James	Jr
QB	11	Lance McIlhenny	So

Defense {{American football

Pos.	#	Name	Class
DL	75	Harvey Armstrong	Sr
DT	74	Michael Carter	Jr
DL	99	Eric Ferguson	Sr
DL		Jerry Kovar	Jr
DB	20	James Mobley	Sr
DB	29	Russell Carter	So
OLB		Tony Good	Jr

Special teams

Pos.	#	Name	Class
K	1	Eddie Garcia	Jr

Head coach

- Ron Meyer

Coordinators/assistant coaches

Legend

- (C) Team captain
- (S) Suspended
- (I) Ineligible
- Injured
- Redshirt

== Rankings ==
Ranking movements Legend: ██ Increase in ranking ██ Decrease in ranking — = Not ranked
	Week														
Poll	Pre	1	2	3	4	5	6	7	8	9	10	11	12	13	Final
AP	—	—	—	20	15	14	10	8	13	10	8	6	6	5	5

== Team players drafted into the NFL ==
Player	Position	Round	Pick	NFL club
Perry Hartnett	Tackle	5	116	Chicago Bears
Harvey Armstrong	Defensive tackle	7	190	Philadelphia Eagles
Eddie Garcia	Kicker	10	264	Green Bay Packers
