= 1981 Texas Longhorns football team =

American college football season

1981 Texas Longhorns football

Cotton Bowl Classic champion

Cotton Bowl Classic, W 14–12 vs. Alabama
- Conference: Southwest Conference

Ranking
- Coaches: No. 4
- AP: No. 2
- Record: 10–1–1 (6–1–1 SWC)
- Head coach: Fred Akers (5th season)
- Offensive coordinator: Ron Toman (1st season)
- Defensive coordinator: Leon Fuller (5th season)
- Home stadium: Texas Memorial Stadium

1981 Southwest Conference football standings
	Conf.					Overall
Team	W		L		T	W		L		T
No. 5 SMU $	7	–	1	–	0	10	–	1	–	0
No. 2 Texas	6	–	1	–	1	10	–	1	–	1
Houston	5	–	2	–	1	7	–	4	–	1
Arkansas	5	–	3	–	0	8	–	4	–	0
Texas A&M	4	–	4	–	0	7	–	5	–	0
Rice	3	–	5	–	0	4	–	7	–	0
Baylor	3	–	5	–	0	5	–	6	–	0
TCU	1	–	6	–	1	2	–	7	–	2
Texas Tech	0	–	7	–	1	1	–	9	–	1
$ – Conference champion; Rankings from AP Poll

The 1981 Texas Longhorns football team represented the University of Texas at Austin in the 1981 NCAA Division I-A football season. The Longhorns finished the regular season with a 9–1–1 record and defeated Alabama in the 1982 Cotton Bowl Classic.

== Schedule ==
Date	Time	Opponent	Rank	Site	TV	Result	Attendance	Source
September 12	7:00 p.m.	Rice	No. 8	Texas Memorial Stadium; Austin, TX (rivalry)		W 31–3	68,497	
September 19	7:00 p.m.	North Texas State*	No. 6	Texas Memorial Stadium; Austin, TX		W 23–10	58,638	
September 26	7:00 p.m.	No. 14 Miami (FL)*	No. 4	Texas Memorial Stadium; Austin, TX		W 14–7	74,653	
October 10	11:30 a.m.	vs. No. 10 Oklahoma*	No. 3	Cotton Bowl; Dallas, TX (rivalry)	ABC	W 34–14	75,587	
October 17	2:30 p.m.	at Arkansas	No. 1	Razorback Stadium; Fayetteville, AR (rivalry)	ABC	L 11–42	44,031	
October 24	1:30 p.m.	at No. 8 SMU	No. 10	Texas Stadium; Irving, TX		W 9–7	60,777	
October 31	1:00 p.m.	Texas Tech	No. 6	Texas Memorial Stadium; Austin, TX (rivalry)		W 26–9	56,439	
November 7	7:30 p.m.	at Houston	No. 5	Houston Astrodome; Houston, TX		T 14–14	52,589	
November 14	1:00 p.m.	TCU	No. 10	Texas Memorial Stadium; Austin, TX (rivalry)		W 31–15	60,038	
November 21	1:00 p.m.	Baylor	No. 8	Texas Memorial Stadium; Austin, TX (rivalry)		W 34–12	72,806	
November 26	2:00 p.m.	at Texas A&M	No. 7	Kyle Field; College Station, TX (rivalry)	CBS	W 21–13	71,731	
January 1, 1982	1:00 p.m.	vs. No. 3 Alabama*	No. 6	Cotton Bowl; Dallas, TX (Cotton Bowl Classic)	CBS	W 14–12	73,243	
*Non-conference game; Rankings from AP Poll released prior to the game; All times are in Central time

== Roster ==
1981 Texas Longhorns football team roster
Players
Coaches
Offense

Pos.	#	Name	Class
OL		Mike Baab
QB		Robert Brewer
OL		Mike Chapman
RB		Darryl Clark
OL		Doug Dawson
QB		Todd Dodge
WR		Brent Duhon
RB		Don Holloway
TE		Alvin Jenkins
RB		Jerome Johnson
RB		A.J. (Jam) Jones
WR		Hamice King
WR		Donnie Little
RB		Mike Luck
WR		Maurice McCloney
QB		Rick McIvor
OL		Bryan Millard
RB		Robert Moerschell
WR		Ronnie Mullins
RB		Terry Orr
RB		Carl Robinson
RB		Ronnie Robinson
TE		Lawrence Sampleton
OL		Joe Shearin
RB		Rodney Tate
OL		Terry Tausch
RB		Johnny Walker
WR		Herkie Walls

Defense

Pos.	#	Name	Class
DB		Vance Bedford
DL		Mike Buchanan
DB		Craig Curry
DL		Ralph Darnell
DL		Kiki DeAyala
DB		William Graham
DL		John Haines
DB		Mike Hatchett
DL		Eric Holle
DB		Bobby Johnson
LB		Jeff Leiding
LB		Bruce Scholtz
LB		Doug Shankle
DL		Kenneth Sims
DL		Mark Weber

Special teams

Pos.	#	Name	Class
K		Raul Allegre
P		John Goodson

Head coach

- Fred Akers

Coordinators/assistant coaches

Legend

- (C) Team captain
- (S) Suspended
- (I) Ineligible
- Injured
- Redshirt
