= 1981 Oklahoma State Cowboys football team =

American college football season

1981 Oklahoma State Cowboys football

Independence Bowl, L 16–33 vs. Texas A&M
- Conference: Big Eight Conference
- Record: 7–5 (4–3 Big 8)
- Head coach: Jimmy Johnson (3rd season)
- Home stadium: Lewis Field

1981 Big Eight Conference football standings
	Conf.					Overall
Team	W		L		T	W		L		T
No. 11 Nebraska $	7	–	0	–	0	9	–	3	–	0
No. 20 Oklahoma	4	–	2	–	1	7	–	4	–	1
Kansas	4	–	3	–	0	7	–	5	–	0
Oklahoma State	4	–	3	–	0	7	–	5	–	0
No. 19 Missouri	3	–	4	–	0	8	–	4	–	0
Iowa State	2	–	4	–	1	5	–	5	–	1
Colorado	2	–	5	–	0	3	–	8	–	0
Kansas State	1	–	6	–	0	2	–	9	–	0
$ – Conference champion; Rankings from AP Poll

The 1981 Oklahoma State Cowboys football team represented Oklahoma State University in the Big Eight Conference during the 1981 NCAA Division I-A football season. In their third season under head coach Jimmy Johnson, the Cowboys compiled a 7–5 record (4–3 against conference opponents), tied for third place in the conference, and were outscored by opponents by a combined total of 216 to 197.

The team's statistical leaders included Shawn Jones with 788 rushing yards, John Doerner with 877 passing yards, John Chesley with 350 receiving yards, and placekicker Larry Roach with 71 points scored.

The team played its home games at Lewis Field in Stillwater, Oklahoma.

== Schedule ==
Date	Opponent	Site	Result	Attendance	Source
September 19	Tulsa*	Lewis Field; Stillwater, OK (rivalry)	W 23–21	47,000	
September 26	San Diego State*	Lewis Field; Stillwater, OK	L 16–23	45,000	
October 3	at North Texas State*	Cotton Bowl; Dallas, TX	W 9–0	17,500	
October 10	at Kansas	Memorial Stadium; Lawrence, KS	W 20–7	39,810	
October 17	at Colorado	Folsom Field; Boulder, CO	L 10–11	36,101	
October 24	Louisville*	Lewis Field; Stillwater, OK	W 19–11	44,000	
October 31	at Missouri	Faurot Field; Columbia, MO	W 16–12	57,541	
November 7	No. 11 Nebraska	Lewis Field; Stillwater, OK	L 7–54	48,500	
November 14	Kansas State^{†}	Lewis Field; Stillwater, OK	W 31–10	49,300	
November 21	at Iowa State	Cyclone Stadium; Ames, IA	W 27–7	46,387	
November 28	Oklahoma	Lewis Field; Stillwater, OK (Bedlam Series)	L 3–27	51,100	
December 12	vs. Texas A&M*	Independence Stadium; Shreveport, LA (Independence Bowl)	L 16–33	48,600	
*Non-conference game; ^{†}Homecoming; Rankings from AP Poll released prior to the game

== After the season ==
The 1982 NFL draft was held on April 27–28, 1982. The following Cowboys were selected.

Round	Pick	Player	Position	NFL team
11	301	Ron Ingram	Wide receiver	Philadelphia Eagles
12	313	Ricky Young	Linebacker	Chicago Bears
