= Ricky Churchman =

American football player (born 1958)

No. 33
- Position: Defensive back

Personal information
- Born: March 14, 1958 (age 68); Pearland, Texas, U.S.
- Listed height: 6 ft 1 in (1.85 m)
- Listed weight: 195 lb (88 kg)

Career information
- High school: Pearland
- College: Texas
- NFL draft: 1980: 4th round, 84th overall pick

Career history
- San Francisco 49ers (1980–1981)

Awards and highlights
- Super Bowl champion (XVI); All-SWC (1979)
- Stats at Pro Football Reference

Richard Cecil Churchman (born March 14, 1958) is an American former professional football player who was a defensive back for two seasons with the San Francisco 49ers of the National Football League (NFL). He played college football for the Texas Longhorns

== Early life ==
Churchman attended Pearland High School in Pearland, Texas, where he played both quarterback and safety.

== College career ==
Churchman played for the Texas Longhorns from 1976-1979, the last three as a starter.

In 1976, Churchman played in 8 games, recording 25 tackles, an interception, a QB hit and 5 broken up passes as the team finished 5-5-1.

He played on the 1977 team that was ranked #1 for most of the season, won the Southwest Conference Championship and which came one win away from winning the National Championship. In that season, the Longhorns suffered numerous injuries at quarterback, and when their only healthy QB had to come out for a single play to change his torn uniform, Churchman was sent in for one play to hand the ball off to Johnny "Lam" Jones. Jones ran the ball 70 yards for a touchdown. Churchman was named 2nd team All Southwest conference that year and, in the game against Baylor, set the school record for pass break-ups in a single game (5). He also set the school record for pass breakups in a season (15).

The next season, the team finished #9 after winning the Sun Bowl. One of the highlights came when Churchman had a 52 yard interception return for a TD against Baylor that was the 11th longest in school history at the time.

In 1979 he made the All-Southwest conference team and the team finished ranked #12 after losing the Sun Bowl.

In 1980, after his college career was over, he played in the East–West Shrine Bowl.

In 1992, he was named to the Austin American-Statesman Longhorns' All-Centennial Team.

== Professional career ==
Churchman was selected by the 49ers in the fourth round of the 1980 NFL draft.

During the third pre-season game of the 1980 season, he suffered a knee injury that would later end his career. He was a rookie starter in his first season, when the 49ers defense featured four rookie starters and in a game against the Patriots, he caught two interceptions as the 49ers recorded a club-record six interceptions in a game. He finished the season on the injured reserve list with a pair of injuries to the thigh and shoulder though he played in all 16 games.

In the 1981 offseason he had the first of 3 knee surgeries. He started the 1981 season still recovering from his knee injury, but saw playing time early in the season. In October he underwent another knee surgery and spent the rest of the season on the injured reserve. The San Francisco 49ers won Super Bowl XVI and he earned a ring, but he did not play in that game or any of the playoff games.

He had a third knee surgery in early 1982. At the start of the 1982 season, he was cut by the 49ers. Churchman later joined in a lawsuit against the team's orthopedic surgeon, along with Paul Hoffer, Donald Sutton and Phil Francis - claiming he mistreated their knee injuries.

== Later life ==
Churchman returned to Texas, earning a Business degree and then went to work for Lockheed where he was a business manager for the company's Tomahawk Cruise Missile Project. Later he moved to Richland, WA, where he worked as the controller and director of finance and accounting for Lockheed's Mission Support Alliance that provided services to cleanup contractors.
