= Jay Jeffrey =

American athletics coach

Playing career

Football
- 1978: Missouri
- 1980–1981: Baylor

Baseball
- 1980–1982: Baylor
- Positions: Quarterback, shortstop, left field

Coaching career (HC unless noted)

Football
- 1982–1986: Southwest Texas State (assistant)

Baseball
- 1985–1986: Southwest Texas State

Head coaching record
- Overall: 60–52 (baseball)

Accomplishments and honors

Awards
- First-team All-SWC (1980)

Jay T. Jeffrey is an American former college athlete and coach. He played college football at the University of Missouri for one season before transferring to Baylor University where he participated in both football and baseball. Jeffrey was also the first baseball head coach of Southwest Texas State University (now known as Texas State University–San Marcos) in their transition to NCAA Division I competition in 1985.

== Playing career ==
Jeffrey was a standout athlete at Shawnee Mission West High School in Overland Park, Kansas. When picking the university where he would want to continue his football career, Missouri and Baylor were his first and second choices, respectively, even though his older brother Neal had previously been a star quarterback at Baylor.

Jeffrey enrolled at Mizzou in the fall of 1977. He did not play during his freshman season. After backing up starting quarterback Phil Bradley during his entire sophomore season in 1978, he grew discontented and looked to transfer. Jeffrey called Baylor head coach Grant Teaff and was told he would have to earn the starting job, but he transferred anyway. Due to NCAA bylaws pertaining to transferring, Jeffrey had to sit out the 1979 season. He then beat out the other quarterbacks to earn the starting job for the 1980 season and guided the Bears to a Southwest Conference championship with a 10–1 record. The Bears reached a #6 national ranking heading into the 1981 Cotton Bowl Classic against #9 Alabama. The Crimson Tide, led by Hall of Fame coach Bear Bryant, won the game 30 to 2, however, and Baylor ended their season with a 10–2 overall record.

The following season, Jeffrey's last, did not duplicate the success of the 1980 season. The Bears finished with a 5–6 overall record and tied for sixth place in the conference. Along with playing football, Jeffrey also suited up for the Baylor baseball team during his final two years at the school. In his junior year he played shortstop while in his senior year he was a left fielder. Once his college athletic career ended in the spring of 1982, Jeffrey was finished as an athlete.

== Coaching career ==
Jeffrey graduated from school in the spring of 1982 and followed former Baylor football assistant John O'Hara to Southwest Texas State University. He served as the quarterbacks and wide receivers coach through the 1986 season. While at Southwest Texas State, Jeffrey also became the baseball team's head coach for the 1985 and 1986 seasons. The 1985 season marked the school's first ever as a Division I member. He compiled an overall record of 60 wins and 52 losses in two years as the head coach.

=== Head coaching record ===
Record table
Season	Team	Overall	Conference	Standing	Postseason
Southwest Texas State Bobcats (Gulf Star Conference) (1985–1986)
1985	Southwest Texas State	29–27	9–9		
1986	Southwest Texas State	31–25	11–9		
Southwest Texas State:		60–52	20–18		
Total:		60–52			
National champion Postseason invitational champion Conference regular season champion Conference regular season and conference tournament champion Division regular season champion Division regular season and conference tournament champion Conference tournament champion

== Later life and personal ==
Jeffrey earned his master's degree in education in 1987 from Southwest Texas State. He moved back to Waco, Texas and has worked at Time Manufacturing ever since. He has five children by his wife, Chris, and his son Ryan played football and ran track at Baylor. Jay Jeffrey, his older brother Neal, and his father James are all inductees into the Baylor Athletic Hall of Fame.
