= Chris Judge =

Chris Judge may refer to:

- Christopher Judge (born 1964), American actor
- Chris Judge (archaeologist), archaeologist at the University of South Carolina Lancaster
