= 1981 Independence Bowl =

Texas A&M Aggies	Oklahoma State Cowboys
(6–5)	(7–4)
SWC	Big Eight
33	16
Head coach: Tom Wilson	Head coach: Jimmy Johnson
	1	2	3	4	Total
Texas A&M	3	17	3	10	33
Oklahoma State	10	0	0	6	16
- Date: December 12, 1981
- Season: 1981
- Stadium: Independence Stadium
- Location: Shreveport, Louisiana
- MVP: QB Gary Kubiak, Texas A&M; LB Mike Green, Oklahoma State
- Referee: Robert Aillet (SEC)
- Attendance: 48,600

United States TV coverage
- Network: Mizlou
- Announcers: Howard David; Danny Abramowicz; Steve Grad

The 1981 Independence Bowl was a college football postseason bowl game between the Oklahoma State Cowboys and the Texas A&M Aggies.

== Background ==
The Cowboys finished tied for 3rd in the Big Eight Conference in their first bowl game since 1976. Meanwhile, the Aggies finished 5th in the Southwest Conference, in their first bowl game since 1978.

== Game summary ==
In the first quarter, the Cowboys took a 10–0 lead on an Ernest Anderson touchdown run and a field goal. But the Aggies closed the quarter out with a field goal of their own to make it 10–3. As it turned out, the Cowboys were held to zero points for the next two quarters. The Aggies scored on another field goal to make it 10–6. Jimmie Williams and Gary Kubiak connected for two touchdown catches of 50 and 38 yards to give the Aggies a 20–10 halftime lead. Another field goal (this from 50 yards) by the Aggies made it 23–10 after three quarters. After an 18 yarder to make it 26–10, the Aggies scored one last time, as Johnny Hector scored on a 4-yard touchdown run to make it 33–10. Vince Orange ran for a 5-yard score to make the final score 33–16. Kubiak went 15-of-20 for 225 yards while Williams caught 5 passes for 118 yards.

== Aftermath ==
Wilson was fired after the season by the Aggies due to the administration not being pleased with his 21-19 record in four years. They hired Jackie Sherrill, who reached three consecutive Cotton Bowl Classics in his seven-year tenure. The Cowboys reached one more bowl game under Johnson, and four more before the end of the decade. A&M returned to the Independence Bowl in 2000, and the Cowboys returned in 2006.

== Statistics ==
Statistics	Oklahoma State	Texas A&M
First downs	16	23
Rushing yards	70	223
Passing yards	187	225
Interceptions	1	0
Total yards	257	432
Fumbles–lost	3–1	4–1
Penalties–yards	3–34	6–60
Punts–average	6–40.3	3–40.0
