= 1981 Sun Bowl =

American college football game

Oklahoma Sooners	Houston Cougars
(6–4–1)	(7–3–1)
Big Eight	SWC
40	14
Head coach: Barry Switzer	Head coach: Bill Yeoman
	AP / Coaches; NR / 19
	1	2	3	4	Total
Oklahoma	7	0	3	30	40
Houston	0	7	0	7	14
- Date: December 26, 1981
- Season: 1981
- Stadium: Sun Bowl
- Location: El Paso, Texas
- MVP: QB Darrell Shepard (Oklahoma)
- Referee: Jimmy Harper (SEC)
- Attendance: 33,816

United States TV coverage
- Network: CBS
- Announcers: Tom Brookshier; Hank Stram; Fred Dryer

The 1981 Sun Bowl was a college football postseason bowl game that featured the Houston Cougars and the Oklahoma Sooners.

== Background ==
The Cougars finished third in the Southwest Conference, making their fourth straight bowl appearance. The Sooners finished second in the Big Eight Conference and made their seventh straight bowl appearance. This was not only the first Sun Bowl appearance for both teams, but the first-ever meeting between the two teams.

== Game summary ==
Darrell Shepard scored on a 34-yard touchdown run to make it 7–0 Oklahoma. Houston responded with a Lionel Wilson touchdown plunge to make it 7–7 at halftime. Michael Keeling gave Oklahoma the lead back on his 32-yard field goal in the third quarter. On the ensuing Houston drive, Robert Durham caught a pass from Wilson at the Sooner 47, and he dashed for what seemed to be a sure touchdown. But at the 3-yard line, Elbert Watts knocked the ball away, and the ball went out of the end zone for a touchback. A few plays later (highlighted by a 42 run by Shepard) ended with a touchdown plunge by Shephard to make it 17–7 early in the fourth quarter. A 14-yard punt by Houston led to Keeling's second field goal from 49 yards out to make it 20–7 midway through the quarter.

A Houston fumble led to a Fred Sims 30-yard score a few plays later. Houston responded with a 74-yard, 13-play drive culminating in a Donald Jordan 6-yard score to make it 27–14 with less than three minutes to go. After Oklahoma recovered the onside kick, Sims' 48-yard run set up Ron Mills' touchdown plunge to make it 33–14 with 1:30 to go. John Truitt returned an interception 28 yards for a touchdown to make the final score 40–14. Darrell Shepard, despite passing for -2 yards on 1 for 5 passing, rushed for 107 yards on 17 carries for 2 touchdowns. Backup Fred Sims, who had rushed for only 179 yards the entire season, ran for 181 yards on 15 carries after an injury to Stanley Wilson. Houston QB Wilson threw 17 of 21 for 216 yards in a losing effort.

=== Scoring summary ===
- Oklahoma – Shepard 34 run (Keeling kick), 1Q – 5:05
- Houston – Wilson 1 run (Clendenen kick), 2Q – 3:39
- Oklahoma – Keeling 32 field goal, 3Q – 4:09
- Oklahoma – Shepard 1 run (Keeling kick), 4Q – 13:07
- Oklahoma – Keeling 49 field goal, 4Q – 8:03
- Oklahoma – Sims 30 run (Keeling kick), 4Q – 6:19
- Houston – Jordan 6 run (Clendenen kick), 4Q – 2:55
- Oklahoma – Mills 2 run (kick failed), 4Q – 1:30
- Oklahoma – Truitt 28 interception return (Keeling kick), 4Q – 1:16

== Aftermath ==
While Houston has not returned to the Sun Bowl since this game, Oklahoma has returned twice (1993, 2009).

== Statistics ==
Statistics	Houston	Oklahoma
First downs	26	15
Rushing yards	157	409
Passing yards	228	-2
Passing (C–A–I)	18–29–1	1–5–1
Total offense	385	407
Fumbles–lost	4–3	2–1
Penalties–yards	2–27	7–48
Punts–average	6–37.0	5–38.6
