= 1981 Gator Bowl =

Arkansas Razorbacks	North Carolina Tar Heels
(8–3)	(9–2)
SWC	ACC
27	31
Head coach: Lou Holtz	Head coach: Dick Crum
AP / Coaches; NR / 17	AP / Coaches; 11 / 9
	1	2	3	4	Total
Arkansas	7	3	0	17	27
North Carolina	3	7	14	7	31
- Date: December 28, 1981
- Season: 1981
- Stadium: Gator Bowl Stadium
- Location: Jacksonville, Florida
- MVP: TB Kelvin Bryant (North Carolina); TB Ethan Horton (North Carolina); RB Gary Anderson (Arkansas)
- Referee: Thomas E. Thamert (CIFOA)
- Attendance: 71,009

United States TV coverage
- Network: ABC
- Announcers: Al Michaels and Ara Parseghian

The 1981 Gator Bowl was an American college football bowl game played on December 28, 1981, at Gator Bowl Stadium in Jacksonville, Florida. The game pitted the Arkansas Razorbacks and the North Carolina Tar Heels. The game was played under foggy conditions, it was 57 degrees at kickoff, but as the game progressed fog came in and made it worse as the game rolled on to the end.

== Background ==
The Razorbacks started the season with three straight wins before a loss to TCU (who finished 2-7-2), though they rebounded to beat Texas Tech before facing off against #1 Texas at home. In that game, they won 42-11, which made them rise to #12 in the polls. A loss to Houston made them fall to #20, but they rebounded to #16 with three straight victories before losing to SMU at home to finish their season fourth in the Southwest Conference and out of the polls. This was their fifth straight bowl appearance and eighth in 11 years. This was their first Gator Bowl since 1960.

The Tar Heels began the season ranked #13, and they responded by winning their first six games of the season, rising to #3 in the polls. But the Tar Heels would finish the season 3-2, with losses to South Carolina (31-13), and #2 Clemson (10-8) and victories over Maryland, Virginia, and Duke while finishing 2nd in the Atlantic Coast Conference. The Tar Heels were invited to their third straight bowl game (their ninth in eleven years) and first Gator Bowl since 1979.

== Game summary ==
- North Carolina - Brooks Barwick, 31 yard field goal
- Arkansas - Derek Holloway, 66 yard touchdown pass from Brad Taylor (Bruce Lahay kick)
- North Carolina - Kelvin Bryant, 1 yard touchdown run (Jeff Hayes kick)
- Arkansas - Lahay, 28 yard field goal
- North Carolina - Ethan Horton, 1 yard touchdown run (Hayes kick)
- North Carolina - Rod Elkins, 1 yard touchdown run (Hayes kick)
- North Carolina - Horton, 4 yard touchdown run (Hayes kick)
- Arkansas - Jessie Clark, 3 yard touchdown run (Clark pass from Taylor)
- Arkansas - Darryl Mason, 7 yard touchdown pass from Taylor (Lahay kick)
- Arkansas - Safety

North Carolina outrushed Arkansas, with 283 yards to their 89. The Razorbacks outthrew the Tar Heels 307 to 53, but they also turned the ball over twice while the Tar Heels turned it over once, with 21 first downs to the Hogs' 16. The two MVPs for North Carolina were Kelvin Bryant and Ethan Horton. Bryant rushed for 148 yards on 27 carries while catching 3 passes for 24 yards, while Horton rushed for 244 yards on 27 carries. For Arkanasas, Gary Anderson was named MVP, as he caught 5 passes for 85 yards.

== Aftermath ==
The Razorbacks would go to six more bowl games in the decade, while the Tar Heels would reach three more. The Razorbacks have not returned since this game, while the Tar Heels returned to the Gator Bowl in 1993.
