= 1981 Rice Owls football team =

American college football season

1981 Rice Owls football
- Conference: Southwest Conference
- Record: 4–7 (3–5 SWC)
- Head coach: Ray Alborn (4th season)
- Home stadium: Rice Stadium

1981 Southwest Conference football standings
	Conf.					Overall
Team	W		L		T	W		L		T
No. 5 SMU $	7	–	1	–	0	10	–	1	–	0
No. 2 Texas	6	–	1	–	1	10	–	1	–	1
Houston	5	–	2	–	1	7	–	4	–	1
Arkansas	5	–	3	–	0	8	–	4	–	0
Texas A&M	4	–	4	–	0	7	–	5	–	0
Rice	3	–	5	–	0	4	–	7	–	0
Baylor	3	–	5	–	0	5	–	6	–	0
TCU	1	–	6	–	1	2	–	7	–	2
Texas Tech	0	–	7	–	1	1	–	9	–	1
$ – Conference champion; Rankings from AP Poll

The 1981 Rice Owls football team was an American football team that represented Rice University in the Southwest Conference during the 1981 NCAA Division I-A football season. In their fourth year under head coach Ray Alborn, the team compiled a 4–7 record.

== Schedule ==
Date	Opponent	Site	Result	Attendance	Source
September 12	at No. 8 Texas	Texas Memorial Stadium; Austin, TX (rivalry)	L 3–31	68,497	
September 19	at Missouri*	Faurot Field; Columbia, MO	L 10–42	57,112	
September 26	at LSU*	Tiger Stadium; Baton Rouge, LA	L 14–28	71,869	
October 3	Tulane*	Rice Stadium; Houston, TX	W 20–16	17,000	
October 10	TCU	Rice Stadium; Houston, TX	W 41–28	15,000	
October 17	at Texas Tech	Jones Stadium; Lubbock, TX	W 30–23	40,073	
October 24	Texas A&M	Rice Stadium; Houston, TX	L 26–51	52,000	
October 31	No. 20 Arkansas	Rice Stadium; Houston, TX	L 7–41	12,000	
November 7	at No. 10 SMU	Texas Stadium; Irving, TX (rivalry)	L 12–33	28,750	
November 14	at Baylor	Baylor Stadium; Waco, TX	W 17–14	30,000	
November 28	Houston	Rice Stadium; Houston, TX (rivalry)	L 3–40	25,000	
*Non-conference game; Rankings from AP Poll released prior to the game
