= 1981 Baylor Bears football team =

American college football season

1981 Baylor Bears football
- Conference: Southwest Conference
- Record: 5–6 (3–5 SWC)
- Head coach: Grant Teaff (10th season)
- Offensive coordinator: John O'Hara (3rd season)
- Co-offensive coordinator: Duke Christian (3rd season)
- Offensive scheme: I formation
- Home stadium: Baylor Stadium

1981 Southwest Conference football standings
| | Conf. | | | | | Overall |
| Team | W | | L | | T | W | | L | | T |
|---|---|---|---|---|---|---|---|---|---|---|
| No. 5 SMU $ | 7 | – | 1 | – | 0 | 10 | – | 1 | – | 0 |
| No. 2 Texas | 6 | – | 1 | – | 1 | 10 | – | 1 | – | 1 |
| Houston | 5 | – | 2 | – | 1 | 7 | – | 4 | – | 1 |
| Arkansas | 5 | – | 3 | – | 0 | 8 | – | 4 | – | 0 |
| Texas A&M | 4 | – | 4 | – | 0 | 7 | – | 5 | – | 0 |
| Rice | 3 | – | 5 | – | 0 | 4 | – | 7 | – | 0 |
| Baylor | 3 | – | 5 | – | 0 | 5 | – | 6 | – | 0 |
| TCU | 1 | – | 6 | – | 1 | 2 | – | 7 | – | 2 |
| Texas Tech | 0 | – | 7 | – | 1 | 1 | – | 9 | – | 1 |
$ – Conference champion; Rankings from AP Poll

The 1981 Baylor Bears football team represented Baylor University in the 1981 NCAA Division I-A football season as a member of the Southwest Conference. The Bears finished the season sixth in the SWC. In the Battle of the Brazos, the Bears beat Texas A&M for the fourth consecutive season. It was the longest winning streak the Bears had in the rivalry.

== Schedule ==
| Date | Opponent | Site | TV | Result | Attendance | Source |
|---|---|---|---|---|---|---|
| September 5 | Lamar* | Baylor Stadium; Waco, TX | | L 17–18 | 22,000 | |
| September 12 | Bowling Green* | Baylor Stadium; Waco, TX | | W 38–0 | 20,000 | |
| September 19 | at Louisiana Tech* | Independence Stadium; Shreveport, LA | | W 28–21 | 21,000 | |
| September 26 | Texas Tech | Baylor Stadium; Waco, TX (rivalry) | | W 28–15 | 40,000 | |
| October 3 | at Houston | Houston Astrodome; Houston, TX (rivalry) | ABC | L 3–24 | 28,118 | |
| October 10 | at No. 14 SMU | Texas Stadium; Irving, TX | | L 20–37 | 33,110 | |
| October 17 | Texas A&M | Baylor Stadium; Waco, TX (Battle of the Brazos) | | W 19–17 | 45,000 | |
| October 24 | TCU^{†} | Baylor Stadium; Waco, TX (rivalry) | | W 34–21 | 40,000 | |
| November 7 | at No. 19 Arkansas | War Memorial Stadium; Little Rock, AR | ESPN | L 39–41 | 54,560 | |
| November 14 | Rice | Baylor Stadium; Waco, TX | | L 14–17 | 30,000 | |
| November 21 | at No. 8 Texas | Texas Memorial Stadium; Austin, TX (rivalry) | | L 12–34 | 72,806 | |
*Non-conference game; ^{†}Homecoming; Rankings from AP Poll released prior to the game

== Team players drafted into the NFL ==
The following players were drafted into professional football following the season.

| Player | Position | Round | Pick | Franchise |
| Walter Abercrombie | Running Back | 1 | 12 | Pittsburgh Steelers |
| Vann McElroy | Defensive Back | 3 | 64 | Oakland Raiders |
| Dennis Gentry | Running Back | 4 | 89 | Chicago Bears |
