= Eric Ferguson =

Eric Ferguson may refer to:

- Eric Ferguson (politician) (1930–2006), Canadian politician
- Eric Ferguson (footballer) (born 1965), former Scottish footballer
- Eric Ferguson (rugby league) (born 1955), Australian rugby league footballer
- Eric Ferguson (radio personality) (born 1967), American radio personality
