= Tom Wilson (American football) =

American football player and coach (1944–2016)

Biographical details
- Born: February 24, 1944; Corsicana, Texas, U.S.
- Died: August 10, 2016 (aged 72); Corsicana, Texas, U.S.

Playing career
- 1963–1965: Texas Tech
- Position: Quarterback

Coaching career (HC unless noted)
- 1966–1972: Texas Tech (assistant)
- 1975–1978: Texas A&M (OC)
- 1978–1981: Texas A&M
- 1984–1985: Texas Tech (OC)
- 1986–1992: Palestine HS (TX)
- 1993–1999: Corsicana HS (TX)

Head coaching record
- Overall: 21–19 (college)
- Bowls: 2–0

Accomplishments and honors

Awards
- First-team All-SWC (1965)

Tom Wilson (February 24, 1944 – August 10, 2016) was an American football player and coach. He served as a head coach at the high school and collegiate level. He was the head football coach at Texas A&M University team from 1978 to 1981.

== Playing career ==
Wilson played quarterback at Corsicana High School under coach Jim Acree. He graduated in 1962. He played college football at Texas Tech University under coach J. T. King.

== Coaching career ==
Following his graduation from Texas Tech in 1966, Wilson became an assistant coach at Texas Tech under King and Jim Carlen, before heading to Texas A&M to join the coaching staff of Emory Bellard. After Bellard resigned in the midst of the 1978 season, Wilson was appointed head coach of the Aggies on October 24, 1978. He led the Aggies to a win in the 1981 Independence Bowl. He amassed a record of 21–19 during his three and a half seasons, before being replaced by Jackie Sherrill in 1982.

In 1984 Wilson returned to his alma mater as offensive coordinator under Jerry Moore. Moore had coached Wilson at Corsicana as an assistant under Acree. In 1986, Wilson left the collegiate ranks, coaching at Palestine High School. Finally, in 1993, he took over head coaching duties at his alma mater Corsicana, coaching the Tigers until his retirement in 1999. As a proponent of the running game, Wilson permitted Ketric Sanford to carry the ball 1,058 times during his career at Corsicana (1993–1995), which is third all-time in Texas behind Robert Strait and Billy Sims. Wilson guided Corsicana to the 1997 4A Division I state championship game versus Texas City, but lost 34–37.

== Head coaching record ==
=== College ===
Year	Team	Overall	Conference	Standing	Bowl/playoffs	Coaches^{#}	AP^{°}
Texas A&M Aggies (Southwest Conference) (1978–1981)
1978	Texas A&M	4–2*	3–2*	5th	W Hall of Fame Classic	18	19
1979	Texas A&M	6–5	4–4	5th			
1980	Texas A&M	4–7	3–5	6th			
1981	Texas A&M	7–5	4–4	5th	W Independence		
Texas A&M:		21–19	14–15	*Wilson took over from Bellard after 6 games			
Total:		21–19					
^{#}Rankings from final Coaches Poll.; ^{°}Rankings from final AP Poll.
