= 1980 All-Southwest Conference football team =

American college football all-star team

The 1980 All-Southwest Conference football team consists of American football players chosen by various organizations for All-Southwest Conference teams for the 1980 NCAA Division I-A football season. The selectors for the 1980 season included the Southwest conference coaches (the "Coaches" team).

== Offensive selections ==
=== Quarterbacks ===
- Jay Jeffrey, Baylor (Coaches-1)

=== Running backs ===
- Dennis Gentry, Baylor (Coaches-1)
- Craig James, SMU (Coaches-1)
- Bobby Stewart, TCU (Coaches-1)
- Walter Abercrombie, Baylor (Coaches-1)

=== Tight ends ===
- Robert Hubble, Rice (Coaches-1)

=== Wide receivers ===
- Stanley Washington, TCU (Coaches-1)

=== Guards ===
- Les Studdard, Texas (Coaches-1)
- Frank Ditta, Baylor (Coaches-1)

=== Tackles ===
- Lee Spivey, SMU (Coaches-1)
- Terry Tausch, Texas (Coaches-1)

=== Centers ===
- Lance Pederson, SMU (Coaches-1)

== Defensive selections ==
=== Defensive tackles ===
- Leonard Mitchell, Houston (Coaches-1)
- Joe Campbell, Baylor (Coaches-1)
- Kenneth Sims, Texas (Coaches-1)
- Harvey Armstrong, SMU (Coaches-1)
- Charles Benson, Baylor (Coaches-1)

=== Linebackers ===
- Doak Field, Baylor (Coaches-1)
- Robert Williamson, Rice (Coaches-1)
- Mike Singletary, Baylor (Coaches-1)

=== Defensive backs ===
- Vann McElroy, Baylor (Coaches-1)
- Ted Watts, Texas Tech (Coaches-1)
- John Simmons, SMU (Coaches-1)
- Kevin Evans, Arkansas (Coaches-1)

== Special teams ==
=== Placekicker ===
- Eddie Garcia, SMU (Coaches-1)

=== Punter ===
- Steve Cox, Arkansas (Coaches-1)

== Miscellaneous ==
- Offensive Player of the Year: Walter Abercrombie, Baylor (Coaches)
- Defensive Player of the Year: Mike Singletary, Baylor (Coaches)
- Coach of the Year: Grant Teaff, Baylor (Coaches)
- Offensive Newcomers of the Year: Jay Jeffrey, Baylor and Renie Baker, Texas Tech (Coaches)
- Defensive Newcomer of the Year: Jerry Bullitt, Texas A&M (Coaches)

== Key ==
Coaches = selected by Southwest Conference coaches

== See also ==
1980 College Football All-America Team
