= Brad Taylor (Canadian football) =

American football player (born 1962)

No. 14, 16
- Position: Quarterback

Personal information
- Born: November 2, 1962 (age 64); Little Rock, Arkansas, U.S.
- Listed height: 6 ft 0 in (1.83 m)
- Listed weight: 193 lb (88 kg)

Career information
- High school: Danville (Danville, Arkansas)
- College: Arkansas (1981–1984)
- NFL draft: 1985: undrafted

Career history
- Edmonton Eskimos (1985–1986); Montreal Alouettes (1987)*; Saskatchewan Roughriders (1987); Winnipeg Blue Bombers (1987); Ottawa Rough Riders (1987)
- * Offseason or practice squad member only

Brad Taylor (born November 2, 1962) is an American former professional football quarterback who played in the Canadian Football League (CFL) with the Edmonton Eskimos and Ottawa Rough Riders. He played high school football at Danville High School in Danville, Arkansas, and led the team to a state-title winning undefeated 14–0 season his senior year. He then played college football for the Arkansas Razorbacks from 1981 to 1984 as a quarterback, punter, and placekicker. He set school career records in total offense and passing yards. Taylor played in the CFL from 1985 to 1987, mostly in a backup role. He was inducted into the Arkansas Sports Hall of Fame in 2022.

== Early life ==
Brad Taylor was born on November 2, 1962, in Little Rock, Arkansas. He played high school football at Danville High School in Danville, Arkansas. He quarterbacked the team to a 32–5 record over three seasons, including a 14–0 state title season his senior year. Taylor recorded 5,576 total yards during high school.

== College career ==
Taylor played college football at the University of Arkansas, where he was a four-year letterman for the Arkansas Razorbacks from 1981 to 1984. He took over as starter as a freshman in 1981 after junior Tom Jones suffered an injury. Overall in 1981, Taylor played in 11 games (three starts) while completing 53 of 99 passes (53.5%) for 726 yards, one touchdown, and four interceptions, and rushing for 131 yards and one touchdown.

Taylor split time with Jones in 1982, with head coach Lou Holtz stating, "We don't have any strict rules regarding who plays when, except that Jones will start and Taylor will play a lot." Taylor finished the year as the team's leading passer with 59 completions on 141 attempts (41.8%) for 1,073 yards, six touchdowns, and nine interceptions, and 108 rushing yards with three touchdowns. He also served as the team's punter, punting 60 times for 2,451 yards (a 40.9 yard average).

After the graduation of Jones, Taylor became the full-time starting quarterback his junior year in 1983 while also tripling as punter and placekicker. Overall in 1983, he recorded totals of 139 completions on 257 passing attempts (54.1%) for 1,837 yards, nine touchdowns, and eight interceptions, three rushing touchdowns, 38 punts for 1,639 yards (a 43.1 average), 14 of 22 field goals, and 16 of 17 extra points. His completion, passing attempt, and passing yard totals were all the most in the Southwest Conference that season.

As a senior in 1984, Taylor relinquished his punting and placekicking duties. He completed 82 of 147 passes (55.8%) for 1,166 yards, seven touchdowns, and 11 interceptions while also running for 135 yards and five touchdowns. He also missed three games due to injury while Danny Nutt started in his place. Taylor set school career records for total offense and passing yards.

== Professional career ==
After going unselected in the 1985 NFL draft, Taylor signed with the Edmonton Eskimos of the Canadian Football League (CFL). He had previously watched CFL games on ESPN and said that former Eskimo player Warren Moon was one of his favorite quarterbacks. During the preseason, Taylor beat out Kevin Ingram for the team's third-string quarterback spot. Taylor spent most of the 1985 season on the reserve list, only dressing for two games and attempting six passes. He dressed in all 18 games in 1986 as the third-string quarterback behind Damon Allen and Matt Dunigan, completing eight of 13 passes for 201 yards and one interception.

In order to receive more playing time, Taylor requested a trade. On February 23, 1987, the Eskimos traded Taylor, Dave Ridgway, and a 1987 CFL draft pick to the Montreal Alouettes for Trevor Bowles. The Alouettes folded before the start of the 1987 season. On June 26, 1987, Taylor was selected by the Saskatchewan Roughriders in a dispersal draft of Alouettes players. He was then waived by Saskatchewan so they could sign him to the practice roster. However, the Winnipeg Blue Bombers claimed Taylor before he cleared waivers. He was placed on Winnipeg's reserve list on July 9, 1987. On August 7, 1987, he was released by the Blue Bombers due to a personal matter.

Taylor received offers from both the Toronto Argonauts and Ottawa Rough Riders. He told the Rough Riders he would sign with them if they released Reggie Collier. Ottawa then released Collier, so Taylor signed with them on August 25, 1987. Taylor started the October 8 game against the Argonauts but was relieved by Todd Dillon after the first quarter. Taylor dressed in seven games overall for Ottawa in 1987, recording 20 completions on 54 passing attempts (37.0%) for 290 yards and three interceptions. He was not invited back to training camp in 1988.

== Career statistics ==
=== CFL ===
Year	Team	Games			Passing								Rushing			
Year	Team	GD	GS	Record	Cmp	Att	Pct	Yds	Y/A	TD	Int	Rtg	Att	Yds	Y/A	TD
1985	EDM	2	0	—	3	6	50.0	26	4.3	0	0	61.8	0	0	0	0
1986	EDM	18	0	0–0	8	13	61.5	201	15.5	0	1	73.4	3	10	3.3	0
1987	OTT	7	1	0–1	20	54	37.0	290	5.4	0	3	32.2	1	5	5.0	0
Career		27	1	0–1	31	73	42.5	517	7.1	0	4	44.1	4	15	3.8	0

=== College ===
Year	Team	Passing								Rushing			Punting			Kicking			
Year	Team	Cmp	Att	Pct	Yds	Y/A	TD	Int	Rtg	Att	Yds	TD	Punts	Yds	Avg	FGM	FGA	XPM	XPA
1981	Arkansas	53	99	53.5	726	7.3	1	4	110.4	55	131	1	1	41	41.0	0	0	0	0
1982	Arkansas	59	141	41.8	1,073	7.6	6	9	107.0	74	108	3	60	2,451	40.9	0	0	0	0
1983	Arkansas	139	257	54.1	1,837	7.1	9	8	119.5	91	-31	3	38	1,639	43.1	14	22	16	17
1984	Arkansas	82	147	55.8	1,166	7.9	7	11	123.2	109	135	5	0	0	0.0	0	0	0	0
Career		333	644	51.7	4,802	7.5	23	32	116.2	329	343	12	99	4,131	41.7	14	22	16	17

== Personal life and legacy ==
Taylor's older brother, Craig, played one year of football at Arkansas Tech before dying in a hunting accident. Brad was inducted into the Arkansas Sports Hall of Fame in 2022.
