= Wesley Roberts =

Wesley Roberts may refer to:

- C. Wesley Roberts (1902–1976), Kansas businessman and Chairman of the Republican National Committee
- Wesley Roberts (swimmer) (born 1997), Cook Islands swimmer
