= 1981 Texas Tech Red Raiders football team =

American college football season

1981 Texas Tech Red Raiders football
- Conference: Southwest Conference
- Record: 1–9–1 (0–7–1 SWC)
- Head coach: Jerry Moore (1st season)
- Offensive scheme: I formation
- Defensive coordinator: Jim Bates (2nd season)
- Base defense: 4–3
- Home stadium: Jones Stadium

1981 Southwest Conference football standings
	Conf.					Overall
Team	W		L		T	W		L		T
No. 5 SMU $	7	–	1	–	0	10	–	1	–	0
No. 2 Texas	6	–	1	–	1	10	–	1	–	1
Houston	5	–	2	–	1	7	–	4	–	1
Arkansas	5	–	3	–	0	8	–	4	–	0
Texas A&M	4	–	4	–	0	7	–	5	–	0
Rice	3	–	5	–	0	4	–	7	–	0
Baylor	3	–	5	–	0	5	–	6	–	0
TCU	1	–	6	–	1	2	–	7	–	2
Texas Tech	0	–	7	–	1	1	–	9	–	1
$ – Conference champion; Rankings from AP Poll

The 1981 Texas Tech Red Raiders football team represented Texas Tech University as a member of the Southwest Conference (SWC) during the 1981 NCAA Division I-A football season. In their first season under head coach Jerry Moore, the Red Raiders compiled a 1–9–1 record (4–5 against SWC opponents), were outscored by a combined total of 298 to 198, and finished in ninth and last place in the conference. The team played its home games at Clifford B. and Audrey Jones Stadium in Lubbock, Texas.

== Schedule ==
Date	Opponent	Site	Result	Attendance	Source
September 12	at Colorado*	Folsom Field; Boulder, CO	L 27–45	34,884	
September 19	New Mexico*	Jones Stadium; Lubbock, TX	W 28–21	42,321	
September 26	at Baylor	Baylor Stadium; Waco, TX (rivalry)	L 15–28	40,000	
October 3	Texas A&M	Jones Stadium; Lubbock, TX (rivalry)	L 23–24	50,081	
October 10	Arkansas	Jones Stadium; Lubbock, TX (rivalry)	L 14–26	41,866	
October 17	Rice	Jones Stadium; Lubbock, TX	L 23–30	40,073	
October 24	Washington*	Jones Stadium; Lubbock, TX	L 7–14	36,335	
October 31	at No. 6 Texas	Texas Memorial Stadium; Austin, TX (rivalry)	L 9–26	56,439	
November 7	TCU^{†}	Jones Stadium; Lubbock, TX (rivalry)	T 39–39	37,714	
November 14	at No. 8 SMU	Texas Stadium; Irving, TX	L 6–30	24,410	
November 21	at Houston	Houston Astrodome; Houston, TX (rivalry)	L 7–15	25,169	
*Non-conference game; ^{†}Homecoming; Rankings from AP Poll released prior to the game
