= 1978 All-Southwest Conference football team =

American college football all-star team

The 1978 All-Southwest Conference football team consists of American football players chosen by various organizations for All-Southwest Conference teams for the 1978 NCAA Division I-A football season. The selectors for the 1978 season included the Associated Press (AP).

== Offensive selections ==
=== Quarterbacks ===
- Danny Davis, Houston (AP-1)
- Mike Ford, SMU (AP-2)

=== Running backs ===
- James Hadnot, Texas Tech (AP-1)
- Curtis Dickey, Texas A&M (AP-1)
- Emmett King, Houston (AP-1)
- Ben Cowins, Arkansas (AP-1)
- Randy Love, Houston (AP-2)
- Jerry Eckwood, Arkansas (AP-2)
- A. J. Jones, Texas (AP-2)

=== Tight ends ===
- Elton Garrett, SMU (AP-1)
- Russ Mikeska, Texas A&M (AP-2)

=== Wide receivers ===
- Emanuel Tolbert, SMU (AP-1)
- Lam Jones, Texas (AP-2)

=== Guards ===
- David Sledge, Baylor (AP-1)
- Dennis Greenawalt, Houston (AP-1)
- Joe Walstad, Texas Tech (AP-2)
- George Stewart, Arkansas (AP-2)

=== Tackles ===
- Greg Kolenda, Arkansas (AP-1)
- Cody Risien, Texas A&M (AP-1)
- Melvin Jones, Houston (AP-2)
- Terry Tausch, Texas (AP-2)

=== Centers ===
- Chuck Brown, Houston (AP-1)
- Rick Shumaker, Arkansas (AP-2)

== Defensive selections ==
=== Linemen ===
- Dan Hampton, Arkansas (AP-1)
- Jimmy Walker, Arkansas (AP-1)
- Jacob Green, Texas A&M (AP-1)
- Steve McMichael, Texas (AP-1)
- Hosea Taylor, Houston (AP-1)
- Curtis Reed, Texas Tech (AP-2)
- Marshall Harris, TCU (AP-2)
- Bill Acker, Texas (AP-2)
- Harvey Armstrong, SMU (AP-2)
- Ron Bones, Texas (AP-2)

=== Linebackers ===
- David Hodge, Houston (AP-1)
- Mike Singletary, Baylor (AP-1)
- Putt Choate, SMU (AP-1)
- Don Kelly, Texas Tech (AP-1)
- Lance Taylor, Texas (AP-2)
- Larry Jackson, Arkansas (AP-2)
- William Hampton, Arkansas (AP-2)

=== Defensive backs ===
- Johnnie Johnson, Texas (AP-1)
- Vaughn Lusby, Arkansas (AP-1)
- David Hill, SMU (AP-1)
- Larry Flowers, Texas Tech (AP-2)
- D. K. Perry, SMU (AP-2)
- Willie Stephens, Texas Tech (AP-2)

== Special teams ==
=== Placekicker ===
- Tony Franklin, Texas A&M (AP-1)

=== Punter ===
- Russell Erxleben, Texas (AP-1)

== Miscellaneous ==
- Offensive Player of the Year: James Hadnot, Texas Tech (AP)
- Defensive Player of the Year: Jimmy Walker, Arkansas; Johnnie Johnson, Texas (AP)
- Coach of the Year: Rex Dockery, Texas Tech (AP)
- Newcomer of the Year: Ron Reeves, Texas Tech (AP)

== Key ==
AP = Associated Press

== See also ==
1978 College Football All-America Team
