= Greg Kolenda =

American football player

Profile
- Position: Offensive tackle

Career information
- High school: Bishop Ward (Kansas City, Kansas)
- College: Arkansas

Career history
- 1976–1979: Arkansas Razorbacks

Awards and highlights
- Unanimous All-American (1979); Third-team All-American (1978); First-team All-SWC (1978)

Greg Kolenda is an American former college football offensive tackle who played for the Arkansas Razorbacks of the University of Arkansas. He was a consensus All-American in 1979.

== Early life ==
Kolends attended Bishop Ward High School in Kansas City, Kansas.

== College career ==
Kolenda was a four-year letterman for the Arkansas Razorbacks of the University of Arkansas from 1976 to 1979. In 1978, he earned Associated Press (AP) first-team All-Southwest Conference (SWC) and AP third-team All-American honors. In 1979, he garnered All-SWC and unanimous All-American recognition. The Razorbacks had a 35–10–2 record during Kolenda's college career. They also won a share of the SWC title during Kolenda's senior year in 1979. He played in the Senior Bowl and Hula Bowl after his senior season. He was named to Arkansas' 1970s All-Decade team. On November 13, 2010, he was the honorary captain for the game against UTEP. He was inducted into the University of Arkansas Sports Hall of Honor in 2019.
