= 1985 All-Southwest Conference football team =

American college football all-star team

The 1985 All-Southwest Conference football team consists of American football players chosen by various organizations for All-Southwest Conference teams for the 1985 NCAA Division I-A football season. The selectors for the 1984 season included the Associated Press (AP).

== Offensive selections ==
=== Wide receivers ===
- Tyrone Thurman, Texas Tech

=== Centers ===
- Gene Chilton, Texas

== Defensive selections ==
=== Linebackers ===
- Ty Allert, Texas
- Brad Hastings, Texas Tech

=== Secondary ===
- Gregory Lasker, Arkansas

== Special teams ==
=== Place-kickers ===
- Jeff Ward, Texas
