= Chris Judge (archaeologist) =

American archaeologist

Christopher Judge is an archaeologist at the University of South Carolina Lancaster, whose research focus is the late prehistoric and early historical archaeology of South Carolina and immediately surrounding areas, as well as blues music in South Carolina. He was an instructor in both anthropology and archaeology. Some of his areas of interest include the Woodland and Mississippian periods, ceramics, theory, public education, and folk music. Judge currently serves as the State Archaeologist of South Carolina.

== Personal life ==
Judge is from Spring Lake, New Jersey. He currently resides in South Carolina with his wife and two sons. He is a professor at the University of South Carolina Lancaster.

He is one of the co-founders and board member of Columbia's Annual Free Blues Festival.

Judge graduated from St. Rose High School in Belmar, New Jersey in the late 1970s. In 1983, he graduated from the University of South Carolina Columbia with a Bachelor of Arts, and in 1987 he received a master's degree in Anthropology and Public Service Archaeology from that university.

== Professional career ==
Judge's area of expertise is late prehistoric archaeology in the southeastern United States with an emphasis on South Carolina. He is currently assistant director of Native American Studies at USC Lancaster.

For a number of years, Judge and his colleagues Carl Steen and Sean Taylor have conducted field work at the Johannes Kolb Site in Mechanicsville, South Carolina. This site is located in the Great Pee Dee Heritage Preserve, and was first found and recorded in 1973 by a high school student named Ernest Helms.

== Selected publications ==
(2006) Palynology and Paleoecology of Late Pleistocene to Holocene, Organic-Rich, Paleomeander/Rimswamp Deposits in South Carolina and Georgia; Co-authors Cohen, Arthur D., David C. Shelley, H. Thomas Foster, II, Michelle A. Metzler, and Elizabeth A. Cannon; Vol. 38, No. 7, p. 235

(2007) Dietary Reconstruction from Late Woodland Pit Features at the Johannes Kolb Site; Presented at 2007 Chacmool Conference however Chris did not make it due to Passport issues.

(2007) The Daws Island Volume: A Tribute to the Career of James L. Michie, edited by Christopher Judge and Carl Steen, South Carolina Antiquities Volume 32 (1&2) 2000 (published August 2007)
