= 1981 Arkansas Razorbacks football team =

American college football season

1981 Arkansas Razorbacks football

Gator Bowl, L 27–31 vs. North Carolina
- Conference: Southwest Conference

Ranking
- Coaches: No. 16
- Record: 8–4 (5–3 SWC)
- Head coach: Lou Holtz (5th season)
- Offensive coordinator: Larry Beightol (1st season)
- Defensive coordinator: Don Lindsey (1st season)
- Captains: Darryl Mason; Teddy Morris
- Home stadium: Razorback Stadium; War Memorial Stadium

1981 Southwest Conference football standings
	Conf.					Overall
Team	W		L		T	W		L		T
No. 5 SMU $	7	–	1	–	0	10	–	1	–	0
No. 2 Texas	6	–	1	–	1	10	–	1	–	1
Houston	5	–	2	–	1	7	–	4	–	1
Arkansas	5	–	3	–	0	8	–	4	–	0
Texas A&M	4	–	4	–	0	7	–	5	–	0
Rice	3	–	5	–	0	4	–	7	–	0
Baylor	3	–	5	–	0	5	–	6	–	0
TCU	1	–	6	–	1	2	–	7	–	2
Texas Tech	0	–	7	–	1	1	–	9	–	1
$ – Conference champion; Rankings from AP Poll

The 1981 Arkansas Razorbacks football team represented the University of Arkansas during the 1981 NCAA Division I-A football season. The biggest win of the year was against a #1 Texas team, which the Razorbacks were rivals with already. Although unranked, the Razorbacks came out on top by 31 points, ending Texas' run at the top of the polls.

Unranked at the end of the regular season, the Hogs still received a Gator Bowl berth against a 10–2 North Carolina team ranked 11th. The SWC's champion, SMU, could not participate in a bowl game due to probation.

Defensive lineman Billy Ray Smith was a consensus All-American for Arkansas. Bruce Lahay, a kicker, also received first-team honors. Lahay was in a three-way tie for field goals per game in 1981, hitting on 1.73 per game. This mark was also held by Kevin Butler of Georgia and Larry Roach of Oklahoma State.

== Schedule ==
Date	Opponent	Rank	Site	TV	Result	Attendance	Source
September 12	Tulsa*		Razorback Stadium; Fayetteville, AR		W 14–10	42,118	
September 19	Northwestern*		War Memorial Stadium; Little Rock, AR		W 38–7	54,532	
September 26	at Ole Miss*		Mississippi Veterans Memorial Stadium; Jackson, MS (rivalry)	ESPN	W 27–13	63,522	
October 3	at TCU		Amon G. Carter Stadium; Fort Worth, TX		L 24–28	30,313	
October 10	at Texas Tech		Jones Stadium; Lubbock, TX (rivalry)	ABC	W 26–14	41,866	
October 17	No. 1 Texas		Razorback Stadium; Fayetteville, AR (rivalry)	ABC	W 42–11	44,031	
October 24	Houston	No. 12	War Memorial Stadium; Little Rock, AR		L 17–20	54,618	
October 31	at Rice	No. 20	Rice Stadium; Houston, TX		W 41–7	12,000	
November 7	Baylor	No. 19	War Memorial Stadium; Little Rock, AR	ESPN	W 41–39	54,560	
November 14	at Texas A&M	No. 16	Kyle Field; College Station, TX (rivalry)	ABC	W 10–7	60,003	
November 21	SMU	No. 16	Razorback Stadium; Fayetteville, AR		L 18–32	43,842	
December 28	vs. No. 11 North Carolina*		Gator Bowl Stadium; Jacksonville, FL (Gator Bowl)	ABC	L 27–31	71,009	
*Non-conference game; Rankings from AP Poll released prior to the game

== Personnel ==
1981 Arkansas Razorbacks football team roster
Players
Coaches
Offense

Pos.	#	Name	Class
RB		Gary Anderson
OL		Jay Bequette
RB		Darryl Bowles
RB		Thomas Brown
RB		Jessie Clark
TE		Steve Clyde
RB		Mark Douglas
OL		Charles Ginn
WR		Derek Holloway
RB		Tim Joiner
QB		Tom Jones
WR		Keith Kidd
RB		Jim Koch
OL		Steve Korte
TE		Darryl Mason
QB		McHan
WR		Gerald McMurray
WR		Mark Mistler
OL		Alfred Mohammed
RB		Nellum
QB		Bill Pierce
QB		Scott Reed
QB		Brad Taylor
RB		James Tolbert
OL		Ronnie Trusty
RB		Wagner
TE		Eddie White

Defense

Pos.	#	Name	Class
DL		Phil Boren
DB		Keith Burns
DB		Kim Dameron	Jr
LB		Steve Douglas
DL		Ron Faurot
LB		Jeff Goff
DB		Nathan Jones
LB		Teddy Morris
DB		Kent Reber
DL		Richard Richardson
DL		Billy Ray Smith
DB		Danny Walters
DL		Bert Zinamon

Special teams

Pos.	#	Name	Class
K, P		Bruce Lahay

Head coach

- Lou Holtz

Coordinators/assistant coaches

- Dave Wommack – Wide receivers

Legend

- (C) Team captain
- (S) Suspended
- (I) Ineligible
- Injured
- Redshirt
