= Kevin Evans =

Kevin Evans may refer to:

- Kevin L. Evans (born 1962), American entertainment executive
- Kevin Evans (cricketer) (born 1963), English cricketer
- Kevin Evans (ice hockey) (born 1965), Canadian ice hockey player
- Kevin Evans (cyclist) (born 1978), South African cyclist
- Kevin Evans (archer) (born 1962), Canadian Paralympic archer
- Kevin Evans (boxer) (born 1976), Welsh boxer
- Kevin Evans (racing driver) (born 1938), former NASCAR Southeastern Series driver
