= 1981 Houston Cougars football team =

American college football season

1981 Houston Cougars football

Sun Bowl, L 14–40 vs. Oklahoma
- Conference: Southwest Conference
- Record: 7–4–1 (5–2–1 SWC)
- Head coach: Bill Yeoman (20th season)
- Defensive coordinator: Don Todd (10th season)
- Captain: Grady Turner
- Home stadium: Houston Astrodome

1981 Southwest Conference football standings
	Conf.					Overall
Team	W		L		T	W		L		T
No. 5 SMU $	7	–	1	–	0	10	–	1	–	0
No. 2 Texas	6	–	1	–	1	10	–	1	–	1
Houston	5	–	2	–	1	7	–	4	–	1
Arkansas	5	–	3	–	0	8	–	4	–	0
Texas A&M	4	–	4	–	0	7	–	5	–	0
Rice	3	–	5	–	0	4	–	7	–	0
Baylor	3	–	5	–	0	5	–	6	–	0
TCU	1	–	6	–	1	2	–	7	–	2
Texas Tech	0	–	7	–	1	1	–	9	–	1
$ – Conference champion; Rankings from AP Poll

The 1981 Houston Cougars football team represented the University of Houston during the 1981 NCAA Division I-A football season. The Cougars were led by 20th-year head coach Bill Yeoman and played their home games at the Astrodome in Houston, Texas. The team competed as members of the Southwest Conference, finishing in third. Houston was invited to the 1981 Sun Bowl in El Paso, Texas, where they lost to Oklahoma, 40–14.

== Schedule ==
Date	Opponent	Site	TV	Result	Attendance	Source
September 5	New Mexico*	Houston Astrodome; Houston, TX	ESPN	W 21–10	26,435	
September 19	at No. 16 Miami (FL)*	Miami Orange Bowl; Miami, FL		L 7–12	32,586	
September 26	Utah State*	Houston Astrodome; Houston, TX		W 35–7	27,462	
October 3	Baylor	Houston Astrodome; Houston, TX (rivalry)	ABC	W 24–3	28,118	
October 10	at Texas A&M	Kyle Field; College Station, TX	ESPN	L 6–7	66,569	
October 17	No. 10 SMU^{†}	Houston Astrodome; Houston, TX (rivalry)		L 22–38	36,892	
October 24	at No. 12 Arkansas	War Memorial Stadium; Little Rock, AR		W 20–17	54,618	
October 31	at TCU	Amon G. Carter Stadium; Fort Worth, TX	ABC	W 20–16	13,257	
November 7	No. 5 Texas	Houston Astrodome; Houston, TX	ESPN	T 14–14	52,589	
November 21	Texas Tech	Houston Astrodome; Houston, TX (rivalry)		W 15–7	25,169	
November 28	at Rice	Rice Stadium; Houston, TX (rivalry)		W 40–3	25,000	
December 26	vs. Oklahoma*	Sun Bowl; El Paso, TX (Sun Bowl)	CBS	L 14–40	33,816	
*Non-conference game; ^{†}Homecoming; Rankings from AP Poll released prior to the game
