= 1981 TCU Horned Frogs football team =

American college football season

1981 TCU Horned Frogs football
- Conference: Southwest Conference
- Record: 2–7–2 (1–6–1 SWC)
- Head coach: F. A. Dry (5th season)
- Offensive scheme: Pro-style
- Defensive coordinator: Bob Junko (6th season)
- Base defense: 4–3
- Home stadium: Amon G. Carter Stadium

1981 Southwest Conference football standings
	Conf.					Overall
Team	W		L		T	W		L		T
No. 5 SMU $	7	–	1	–	0	10	–	1	–	0
No. 2 Texas	6	–	1	–	1	10	–	1	–	1
Houston	5	–	2	–	1	7	–	4	–	1
Arkansas	5	–	3	–	0	8	–	4	–	0
Texas A&M	4	–	4	–	0	7	–	5	–	0
Rice	3	–	5	–	0	4	–	7	–	0
Baylor	3	–	5	–	0	5	–	6	–	0
TCU	1	–	6	–	1	2	–	7	–	2
Texas Tech	0	–	7	–	1	1	–	9	–	1
$ – Conference champion; Rankings from AP Poll

The 1981 TCU Horned Frogs football team represented Texas Christian University (TCU) in the 1981 NCAA Division I-A football season. The Horned Frogs finished the season 2–7–2 overall and 1–6–1 in the Southwest Conference. The team was coached by F. A. Dry, in his fifth year as head coach. The Frogs played their home games in Amon G. Carter Stadium, which is located on campus in Fort Worth, Texas.

== Schedule ==
Date	Opponent	Site	Result	Attendance	Source
September 5	at Auburn*	Jordan-Hare Stadium; Auburn, AL	L 16–24	48,000	
September 19	UT Arlington*	Amon G. Carter Stadium; Fort Worth, TX	W 38–16	18,071	
September 26	No. 20 SMU	Amon G. Carter Stadium; Fort Worth, TX (rivalry)	L 9–20	25,862	
October 3	No. 19 Arkansas	Amon G. Carter Stadium; Fort Worth, TX	W 28–24	30,313	
October 10	at Rice	Rice Stadium; Houston, TX	L 28–41	15,000	
October 17	Utah State*	Amon G. Carter Stadium; Fort Worth, TX	T 13–13	15,357	
October 24	at Baylor	Baylor Stadium; Waco, TX (rivalry)	L 21–34	40,000	
October 31	Houston	Amon G. Carter Stadium; Fort Worth, TX	L 16–20	13,257	
November 7	at Texas Tech	Jones Stadium; Lubbock, TX (rivalry)	T 39–39	37,714	
November 14	at No. 10 Texas	Texas Memorial Stadium; Austin, TX (rivalry)	L 15–31	60,038	
November 21	Texas A&M	Amon G. Carter Stadium; Fort Worth, TX (rivalry)	L 7–37	29,483	
*Non-conference game; Rankings from AP Poll released prior to the game

== Roster ==
1981 TCU Horned Frogs football team roster
Players
Coaches
Offense

Pos.	#	Name	Class
WR	1	Phil Epps	Sr
TE	80	Dan Sharp	Fr

Defense

Pos.	#	Name	Class
LB	89	Kyle Clifton	So

Special teams

Pos.	#	Name	Class

Head coach

- F. A. Dry

Coordinators/assistant coaches

- Mike Westhoff – Offensive line

Legend

- (C) Team captain
- (S) Suspended
- (I) Ineligible
- Injured
- Redshirt
