= Arkansas–Texas A&M football rivalry =

American college football rivalry

Southwest Classic
- Arkansas Razorbacks Texas A&M Aggies
- First meeting: October 31, 1903; Texas A&M, 6–0
- Latest meeting: October 3, 2026; Texas A&M, 34–7
- Next meeting: 2028
- Trophy: Southwest Classic Trophy, 2009–2024

Statistics
- Total meetings: 83
- All-time series: Arkansas leads, 42–38–3
- Trophy series: Texas A&M leads, 13–4–0 (.750)
- Largest victory: Texas A&M, 58–10 (2012)
- Longest win streak: Arkansas, 9 (1958–1966); Texas A&M, 9 (2012–2020)
- Current win streak: Texas A&M, 5 (2022–present)

Locations of Arkansas, Texas A&M, and AT&T Stadium

The Arkansas–Texas A&M football rivalry is an American college football rivalry between the Arkansas Razorbacks and Texas A&M Aggies, which started in 1903. Between 1992 and 2008, the schools did not play each other when Arkansas left the Southwest Conference to join the Southeastern Conference. The rivalry was renewed as a neutral-site out-of-conference contest (and branded as The Southwest Classic) in 2009; in 2012 it once again became a conference rivalry when Texas A&M also joined the Southeastern Conference. Arkansas leads the series 42–38–3.

== Series history ==
Arkansas and Texas A&M first played each other in 1903, and would play each other three times from 1903 to 1912, all as non-conference matchups.

Arkansas and Texas A&M would not meet on the field again until 1927, notwithstanding that both schools became charter members of the Southwest Conference twelve years earlier in 1915. The schools played annually from 1927 to 1930, but would not meet again until 1934. From 1934 to 1991, the two teams played annually as conference members. The annual matchup ceased in 1991 when Arkansas left the conference to join the Southeastern Conference.

On March 10, 2008, officials from both schools announced the series would recommence on October 3, 2009, under the name "Southwest Classic." The annual location for the game was announced as Cowboys Stadium (now called AT&T Stadium), located in Arlington. The attendance for the stadium was initially expected to be in the 80,000 range. Depending on ticket demand, temporary seating can be added to the stadium to increase the capacity up to 100,000 seats for the game. The tickets were said to be split 50/50 between the two schools. The initial agreement between the two schools allowed the game to be played for at least 10 years, followed by 5 consecutive, 4-year rollover options, allowing the game to potentially be played for a total of 30 consecutive seasons.

The rivalry once again became a conference matchup when Texas A&M joined the SEC on July 1, 2012, and became a member of the West Division of the conference alongside Arkansas. However, for Texas A&M's first two seasons in the SEC the series was played as a home-and-home series at the schools' campuses (Texas A&M hosted in 2012 and Arkansas hosted in 2013); the series resumed neutral-site play in AT&T Stadium for the 2014 season until at least 2024. Multiple athletic directors at Texas A&M have expressed a desire to move away from playing the game at AT&T Stadium, and on July 20, 2020, it was reported that the game would be played at Kyle Field due to precautions stemming from the COVID-19 pandemic, with a return trip potentially being played at Donald W. Reynolds Razorback Stadium in 2021. That return trip to Fayetteville did not happen, and the series resumed being played in Arlington in 2021.

After joining the SEC in 2012, A&M went on a 9-game winning streak, which was its longest in the series and first winning streak of more than 2 games in the series for the Aggies since 1938–1943. Arkansas broke the streak in 2021 and improved its record against A&M in Arlington to 4–6.

Starting in 2025, the game will no longer be a neutral-site game played in Arlington. Further, due to the expansion of the SEC in 2024, which eliminated divisions, the two teams will no longer meet on an annual basis, as both teams are not protected opponents of each other in conference scheduling.

== Game results ==
Arkansas victories	Texas A&M victories	Tie games

No.	Date	Location	Winner	Score
1	October 31, 1903	Houston, Texas	Texas A&M	6–0
2	October 29, 1910	Fayetteville, Arkansas	Arkansas	5–0
3	October 26, 1912	Dallas, Texas	Texas A&M	27–0
4	October 15, 1927	College Station, Texas	Texas A&M	40–6
5	October 27, 1928	Fayetteville, Arkansas	Arkansas	27–12
6	October 26, 1929	College Station, Texas	Arkansas	14–13
7	October 18, 1930	Little Rock, Arkansas	Arkansas	13–0
8	November 3, 1934	College Station, Texas	Tie	7–7
9	November 2, 1935	Little Rock, Arkansas	Arkansas	14–7
10	October 31, 1936	College Station, Texas	Arkansas	18–0
11	October 30, 1937	Fayetteville, Arkansas	#20 Arkansas	26–13
12	October 29, 1938	College Station, Texas	Texas A&M	13–7
13	November 4, 1939	Fayetteville, Arkansas	#5 Texas A&M	27–0
14	November 2, 1940	College Station, Texas	#5 Texas A&M	17–0
15	November 1, 1941	Little Rock, Arkansas	#5 Texas A&M	7–0
16	October 31, 1942	College Station, Texas	Texas A&M	41–0
17	October 30, 1943	Fayetteville, Arkansas	#19 Texas A&M	13–0
18	November 4, 1944	College Station, Texas	Arkansas	7–6
19	November 3, 1945	Fayetteville, Arkansas	Texas A&M	34–0
20	November 2, 1946	College Station, Texas	Arkansas	7–0
21	November 1, 1947	Fayetteville, Arkansas	Tie	21–21
22	October 30, 1948	College Station, Texas	Arkansas	28–6
23	October 29, 1949	Fayetteville, Arkansas	Arkansas	27–6
24	November 4, 1950	College Station, Texas	Texas A&M	42–13
25	November 3, 1951	Fayetteville, Arkansas	Arkansas	33–21
26	November 1, 1952	College Station, Texas	Texas A&M	31–12
27	October 31, 1953	Little Rock, Arkansas	Arkansas	41–14
28	October 30, 1954	College Station, Texas	#4 Arkansas	14–7
29	October 29, 1955	Fayetteville, Arkansas	Tie	7–7
30	November 3, 1956	College Station, Texas	#5 Texas A&M	27–0
31	November 2, 1957	Fayetteville, Arkansas	Texas A&M	7–6
32	November 1, 1958	College Station, Texas	Arkansas	21–8
33	October 31, 1959	Fayetteville, Arkansas	#17 Arkansas	12–7
34	October 29, 1960	College Station, Texas	#12 Arkansas	7–3
35	November 4, 1961	Fayetteville, Arkansas	Arkansas	15–8
36	November 3, 1962	College Station, Texas	#8 Arkansas	17–7
37	November 2, 1963	Little Rock, Arkansas	Arkansas	21–7
38	October 31, 1964	College Station, Texas	#4 Arkansas	17–0
39	October 30, 1965	Little Rock, Arkansas	#2 Arkansas	31–0
40	October 29, 1966	College Station, Texas	#9 Arkansas	34–0
41	November 4, 1967	Fayetteville, Arkansas	Texas A&M	33–21
42	November 2, 1968	College Station, Texas	#17 Arkansas	25–22

No.	Date	Location	Winner	Score
43	November 1, 1969	Fayetteville, Arkansas	#4 Arkansas	35–13
44	October 31, 1970	College Station, Texas	#8 Arkansas	45–6
45	October 30, 1971	Little Rock, Arkansas	Texas A&M	17–9
46	November 4, 1972	College Station, Texas	Texas A&M	10–7
47	November 3, 1973	Fayetteville, Arkansas	Arkansas	14–10
48	November 2, 1974	College Station, Texas	#8 Texas A&M	20–10
49	December 6, 1975	Little Rock, Arkansas	#18 Arkansas	31–6
50	November 13, 1976	Little Rock, Arkansas	#16 Texas A&M	31–10
51	November 12, 1977	College Station, Texas	#8 Arkansas	26–20
52	November 18, 1978	Little Rock, Arkansas	#13 Arkansas	26–7
53	November 17, 1979	College Station, Texas	#8 Arkansas	22–10
54	November 15, 1980	Fayetteville, Arkansas	Arkansas	27–24
55	November 14, 1981	College Station, Texas	#16 Arkansas	10–7
56	November 13, 1982	Little Rock, Arkansas	#10 Arkansas	35–0
57	November 12, 1983	College Station, Texas	Texas A&M	36–23
58	November 17, 1984	Fayetteville, Arkansas	Arkansas	28–0
59	November 16, 1985	College Station, Texas	Texas A&M	10–6
60	November 15, 1986	Little Rock, Arkansas	#17 Arkansas	14–10
61	November 14, 1987	College Station, Texas	#19 Texas A&M	14–0
62	November 12, 1988	Fayetteville, Arkansas	#11 Arkansas	25–20
63	November 24, 1989	College Station, Texas	#9 Arkansas	23–22
64	November 17, 1990	Fayetteville, Arkansas	Texas A&M	20–16
65	November 16, 1991	College Station, Texas	#13 Texas A&M	13–3
66	October 3, 2009	Arlington, Texas	Arkansas	47–19
67	October 9, 2010	Arlington, Texas	#11 Arkansas	24–17
68	October 1, 2011	Arlington, Texas	#18 Arkansas	42–38
69	September 29, 2012	College Station, Texas	Texas A&M	58–10
70	September 28, 2013	Fayetteville, Arkansas	#10 Texas A&M	45–33
71	October 18, 2014	Arlington, Texas	#6 Texas A&M	35–28^{OT}
72	September 26, 2015	Arlington, Texas	#14 Texas A&M	28–21^{OT}
73	September 24, 2016	Arlington, Texas	#10 Texas A&M	45–24
74	September 23, 2017	Arlington, Texas	Texas A&M	50–43^{OT}
75	September 29, 2018	Arlington, Texas	Texas A&M	24–17
76	September 28, 2019	Arlington, Texas	#23 Texas A&M	31–27
77	October 31, 2020	College Station, Texas	#8 Texas A&M	42–31
78	September 25, 2021	Arlington, Texas	#16 Arkansas	20–10
79	September 24, 2022	Arlington, Texas	#23 Texas A&M	23–21
80	September 30, 2023	Arlington, Texas	Texas A&M	34–22
81	September 28, 2024	Arlington, Texas	#24 Texas A&M	21–17
82	October 18, 2025	Fayetteville, Arkansas	#4 Texas A&M	45–42
83	October 3, 2026	College Station, Texas	Texas A&M	34–7
Series: Arkansas leads 42–38–3

=== Locations ===
As of October 3, 2026

State	City	Games	Arkansas victories	Texas A&M victories	Ties	Years played
Arkansas	Fayetteville	22	12	8	2	1910, 1928, 1937–73, 1980, 1984–90, 2013, 2025
Arkansas	Little Rock	12	9	3	0	1930–35, 1941, 1953, 1963–86
Arkansas	Total	34	21	11	2	-
Texas	College Station	34	17	17	1	1903, 1927–91, 2012, 2020
Texas	Arlington	13	4	9	0	2009–2011, 2014–2019, 2021–2024
Texas	Dallas	1	0	1	0	1912
Texas	Total	48	21	27	1	-
Series total		82	42	38	3	-

== Notable games ==
=== 1903 – First meeting ===
Texas A&M 6 – Arkansas 0

In the first ever meeting, and only the 43rd game ever played by Arkansas and the 42nd ever played by Texas A&M, the Aggies won 6–0. The Aggies were coached by J. E. Platt and the Razorbacks were coached (in his only season as a head coach) by D. A. McDaniel.

=== 1937 – First ranking in series ===
Arkansas 26 – Texas A&M 13

After the introduction of the AP Poll in the 1936 season, the first ranking in the series came just the next year, with defending conference champions Arkansas being ranked No. 20 prior to the matchup. Arkansas won 26–13, in the two teams' second meeting in Fayetteville as conference foes.

=== 1939 – Texas A&M's national championship year ===
Texas A&M 27 – Arkansas 0

In 1939, after winning the game 27–0, the Aggies went on to an overall record of 11–0 and named the college football national champions in the Associated Press writers' poll for the 1939 college football season.

=== 1964 – Arkansas's national championship year ===
Arkansas 17 – Texas A&M 0

In 1964, after winning the game 17–0 in College Station, Texas, the Razorbacks went on to an overall record of 11–0 and won the college football national championship by beating Nebraska in the Cotton Bowl Classic. The Aggies were coached (in his final season) by Hank Foldberg, and Arkansas was coached by Hall of Fame coach Frank Broyles. This game marked the beginning of a streak of three straight scoreless games in the series for the Aggies.

=== 1975 – First ranked matchup ===
Arkansas 31 – Texas A&M 6

In 1975, Texas A&M was undefeated at 10–0 and ranked No. 2 in the nation coming into the regular season finale at No. 18 Arkansas. The game was played in Little Rock at War Memorial Stadium in front of a national audience, broadcast on ABC. If the Aggies won, they would clinch the Southwest Conference championship outright, and would have a chance to win a national championship in the 1976 Cotton Bowl Classic. But it wasn't to be, as the Razorbacks defeated Texas A&M 31–6, forcing a three-way tie for the SWC crown between Arkansas, Texas, and Texas A&M, sending the Razorbacks to the Cotton Bowl. Arkansas would beat Georgia in the Cotton Bowl Classic, 31–10, finishing the season 10–2 and ranked No. 7 in the AP poll. Meanwhile, the Aggies would stumble in a Liberty Bowl loss to USC, 20–0, and also finish the season with a 10–2 record and No. 11 ranking in the AP poll.

=== 1980 ===
Arkansas 27 – Texas A&M 24

The 1980 contest won by Arkansas 27–24 was Texas A&M's 800th game ever played by the program. Arkansas was led by head coach Lou Holtz in his fourth year with the team, and went on to an overall record of 7–5 (3–5 in conference) for the season. The Aggies were led by Tom Wilson in his next to last season with the team, and finished the year 4–7 (3–5 in conference).

=== 1986 ===
Arkansas 14 – Texas A&M 10

In 1986, the No. 7 Aggies were the defending Southwest Conference champions when they rolled into Little Rock to face No. 17 Arkansas in front of a sell out crowd at War Memorial Stadium. The Razorbacks would jump out to an early 7–0 lead, but Texas A&M would tie the game with a touchdown of their own, and the teams would be tied at halftime, 7–7, due to a missed A&M field goal. Arkansas would take back the lead in the 3rd quarter on a Greg Thomas touchdown run. The Razorback defense played great all game long, holding the Aggies to a field goal in the second half. On fourth down from inside the Arkansas fifteen yard line, Arkansas's defense tipped away an Aggie pass into the end zone in the closing seconds of the game, securing the victory for the Razorbacks. Both teams would finish the season 9–3 after bowl losses.

=== 1991 – Arkansas's last game in the Southwest Conference ===
Texas A&M 13 – Arkansas 3

In the last Southwest Conference meeting on November 16, 1991, at Kyle Field, Texas A&M won 13–3 in a game nationally televised by ESPN. The Razorbacks came out in the wishbone formation on offense, but the Aggie defense held the Hogs to only 121 yards of total offense. After the season, the Razorbacks went on to leave the Southwest Conference, and join the Southeastern Conference, thereby ending the yearly in-conference game with the Aggies.

Logo used for the 2009 renewal of the series, titled the "Southwest Classic", between Arkansas and Texas A&M.

=== 2009 – Renewal ===
Arkansas 47 – Texas A&M 19

On October 3, 2009, the two teams met for the first time since 1991. The rivalry was originally slated to take place on a yearly basis at the new Cowboys Stadium in Arlington, Texas. Arkansas came back from a 10–0 deficit in the first quarter to win 47–19.

=== 2011 – "Welcome to the SEC" ===
Arkansas 42 – Texas A&M 38

The Aggies, leading 35–17 at the half, blew their 18-point lead and only scored 3 points in the second half. As Broderick Green charged into the end zone on the final score of the game, Arkansas fans appeared on the Cowboys Stadium video holding a sign saying "Welcome to the SEC" (in recognition of A&M's announcement only six days earlier that it would join Arkansas as a member of the SEC in 2012). Since the "Welcome to the SEC" game, the Aggies have won 13 of the 14 games played as conference rivals.

=== 2012 – First all-SEC game ===
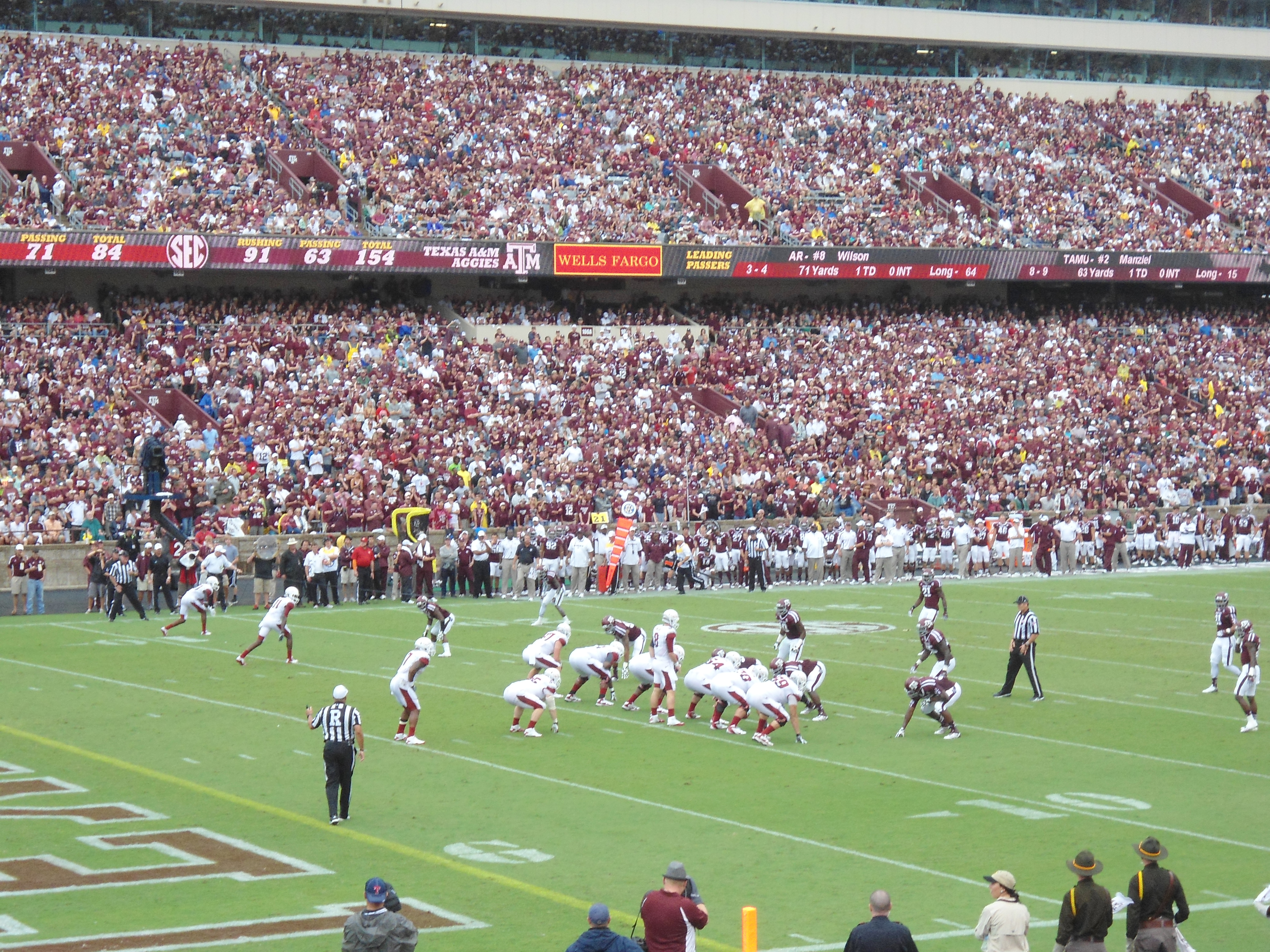
Tyler Wilson leads the Arkansas offense in the 2012 game which A&M won 58–10.

Texas A&M 58 – Arkansas 10

On September 29, 2012, the Aggies and Razorbacks met on the gridiron as conference rivals for the first time since 1991, with A&M joining Arkansas in the Southeastern Conference. The Aggies won 58–10, which is the largest margin of victory in the series. The game moved from the neutral-site Cowboys Stadium venue of the last three years to Kyle Field as part of a planned home-and-home series with Arkansas for A&M's first two SEC seasons; the 2014 matchup returned to AT&T Stadium.

=== 2014, '15 & '17 – 3 OT games in 4 years ===
The 2014 contest returned to AT&T Stadium (home of the Dallas Cowboys) after a two-year "home-and-home" schedule the previous two seasons. Both the 2014 and 2015 contests went into overtime. These back-to-back years of overtime were also the first two overtimes between the two schools in the rivalry's history, after overtime was adopted by the NCAA for all games beginning with the bowl games following the 1995 regular season. The 2017 matchup also ended in overtime, with the two teams combining for a series record 93 points. Texas A&M won all three of these overtime matches.

== See also ==
- List of NCAA college football rivalry games
