= Charles Benson =

American football player (born 1960)

No. 78, 97, 69
- Position: Defensive end

Personal information
- Born: November 21, 1960 (age 65); Houston, Texas, U.S.
- Listed height: 6 ft 3 in (1.91 m)
- Listed weight: 267 lb (121 kg)

Career information
- High school: Aldine (Houston)
- College: Baylor
- NFL draft: 1983: 3rd round, 76th overall pick

Career history
- Miami Dolphins (1983–1984); Indianapolis Colts (1985); Detroit Lions (1987)

Awards and highlights
- 2× First-team All-SWC (1980, 1982)

Career NFL statistics
- Sacks: 2
- Fumble recoveries: 1
- Interceptions: 1
- Stats at Pro Football Reference

Charles Henry Benson (born November 21, 1960) is an American former professional football player who was a defensive end for four seasons in the National Football League (NFL) with the Miami Dolphins, Indianapolis Colts, and Detroit Lions. Benson appeared in a total of 28 career games, while making three starts. He played college football for the Baylor Bears.
