= Mike Whitwell =

American football player (born 1958)

No. 81, 21
- Positions: Safety, wide receiver

Personal information
- Born: November 14, 1958 (age 67); Kenedy, Texas, U.S.
- Listed height: 6 ft 0 in (1.83 m)
- Listed weight: 175 lb (79 kg)

Career information
- High school: Cotulla (Cotulla, Texas)
- College: Texas A&M (1978–1981)
- NFL draft: 1982: 6th round, 162nd overall pick

Career history
- Cleveland Browns (1982–1984)

Career NFL statistics
- Interceptions: 3
- Sacks: 1
- Stats at Pro Football Reference

Michael Carroll Whitwell (born November 14, 1958) is an American former professional football player who played two seasons with the Cleveland Browns of the National Football League (NFL). He was selected by the Browns in the sixth round of the 1982 NFL draft after playing college football for the Texas A&M Aggies.

== Early life and college ==
Michael Carroll Whitwell was born on November 14, 1958, in Kenedy, Texas. He attended Cotulla High School in Cotulla, Texas.

Whitwell was a four-year letterman at wide receiver for the Texas A&M Aggies of Texas A&M University from 1978 to 1981. He caught one pass for 17 yards in 1978 and three passes for 21 yards and two touchdowns in 1979. During the 1980 season, he totaled 30 receptions for 603 yards and two touchdowns. His 20.1 yards per catch was the highest in the Southwest Conference (SWC) that year. As a senior in 1981, Whitwell, recorded 27 receptions for 731 yards and three touchdowns. His 27.1 yards per catch led the SWC for the second consecutive season.

== Professional career ==
Whitwell was selected by the Cleveland Browns in the sixth round, with the 162nd overall pick, of the 1982 NFL draft. He played in nine games for the Browns in 1982 and was listed as a wide receiver. He also appeared in one playoff game that year. He converted to safety in 1983 and started all 16 games for Cleveland during the 1983 season, totaling three interceptions for 67 yards and one sack. The Browns finished the year with a 9–7 record. Whitwell was placed on injured reserve on August 21, 1984, and missed the entire season. He was released on August 20, 1985.
