= Terry Tausch =

American football player (1959–2020)

No. 66
- Position: Guard

Personal information
- Born: February 5, 1959; New Braunfels, Texas, U.S.
- Died: March 25, 2020 (aged 61); Plano, Texas, U.S.
- Listed height: 6 ft 5 in (1.96 m)
- Listed weight: 275 lb (125 kg)

Career information
- High school: New Braunfels (New Braunfels, Texas)
- College: Texas
- NFL draft: 1982: 2nd round, 39th overall pick

Career history
- Minnesota Vikings (1982–1988); San Francisco 49ers (1989)

Awards and highlights
- Super Bowl champion (XXIV); Consensus All-American (1981); First-team All-SWC (1980); Second-team All-SWC (1978); 1982 Cotton Bowl champion; 1978 Sun Bowl champion

Career NFL statistics
- Games played: 90
- Games started: 68
- Stats at Pro Football Reference

Terry Wayne Tausch (February 5, 1959 – March 25, 2020) was an American professional football player who played guard in the National Football League (NFL) for 8 seasons where he played on the San Francisco 49ers when they won Super Bowl XXIV. He played most of his career with the Minnesota Vikings. He played college football at The University of Texas where he was a two-time All-American, a consensus All-American and played for the national championship.

== College ==
Tausch was recruited by the University of Texas at Austin out of New Braunfels High School where he played tight end on the football team. At Texas he was a Football News All-American in 1979 and a consensus All-American in 1981 as an offensive tackle. The Longhorns won both the Sun Bowl and Cotton Bowl while he was there and one week in 1981 they were ranked #1. After upsetting Alabama in the Cotton Bowl, they finished the season ranked #2. Before the NFL draft, he played in the 1982 Hula Bowl. After retiring, he was selected in 2001 for the Texas Athletics Hall of honor.

== Professional ==
The Minnesota Vikings made Tausch a second-round draft choice in 1982 with the 39th overall draft pick. He played seven seasons for Minnesota in 68 games at tackle and right guard. He was a regular starter, but missed much of the 1987 season with a knee injury. He was signed by the San Francisco 49ers as a Plan B Free Agent in 1989. He played one season for the 49ers as a guard. He split time with starter Bruce Collie that season. Even though they "struggled" that season, they played well enough in Super Bowl XXIV that sports illustrated singled them out. At the end of the season he was made a Plan B free agent, but was left unsigned.

== Personal life ==
Terry and his wife, Ela, had two sons, Nicholas and Eric. Nicholas and Eric played college football at Notre Dame and TCU, respectively.

On March 25, 2020, Tausch died at his home in Plano, Texas at the age of 61.
