= Harvey Armstrong =

American football player (born 1959)

No. 96, 79
- Position: Defensive tackle

Personal information
- Born: December 29, 1959 (age 66); Houston, Texas, U.S.
- Listed height: 6 ft 3 in (1.91 m)
- Listed weight: 255 lb (116 kg)

Career information
- High school: Kashmere (Houston)
- College: SMU
- NFL draft: 1982: 7th round, 190th overall pick

Career history

Playing
- Philadelphia Eagles (1982–1984); Indianapolis Colts (1986–1990)

Coaching
- Chicago Enforcers (2001) Defensive line coach

Awards and highlights
- First-team All-American (1981); First-team All-SWC (1980); Second-team All-SWC (1978)

Career NFL statistics
- Sacks: 13
- Fumble recoveries: 9
- Interceptions: 1
- Stats at Pro Football Reference

Harvey Lee Armstrong (born December 29, 1959) is an American former professional football player who was a defensive tackle for eight seasons in the National Football League (NFL) for the Philadelphia Eagles and Indianapolis Colts. He played college football for the SMU Mustangs.

Armstrong has a daughter, Sidney Floyd (with Jennifer Floyd). Later, he married Sharon McCarthy and they have a daughter, Madison J. Armstrong.
