= 1981 Miami Hurricanes football team =

American college football season

1981 Miami Hurricanes football
- Conference: Independent

Ranking
- AP: No. 8
- Record: 9–2
- Head coach: Howard Schnellenberger (3rd season)
- Offensive coordinator: Kim Helton (3rd season)
- Offensive scheme: Pro-style
- Defensive coordinator: Tom Olivadotti (1st season)
- Base defense: 5–2
- MVP: Jim Kelly
- Home stadium: Miami Orange Bowl

1981 NCAA Division I-A independents football records
	Conf.					Overall
Team	W		L		T	W		L		T
No. 4 Pittsburgh		–		–		11	–	1	–	0
No. 3 Penn State		–		–		10	–	2	–	0
No. 8 Miami (FL)		–		–		9	–	2	–	0
Southern Miss		–		–		9	–	2	–	1
No. 17 West Virginia		–		–		9	–	3	–	0
Colgate		–		–		7	–	3	–	0
Virginia Tech		–		–		7	–	4	–	0
Navy		–		–		7	–	4	–	1
Cincinnati		–		–		6	–	5	–	0
Florida State		–		–		6	–	5	–	0
Holy Cross		–		–		6	–	5	–	0
Tulane		–		–		6	–	5	–	0
UNLV		–		–		6	–	6	–	0
South Carolina		–		–		6	–	6	–	0
Temple		–		–		5	–	5	–	0
Boston College		–		–		5	–	6	–	0
East Carolina		–		–		5	–	6	–	0
Northeast Louisiana		–		–		5	–	6	–	0
Louisville		–		–		5	–	6	–	0
Notre Dame		–		–		5	–	6	–	0
Rutgers		–		–		5	–	6	–	0
William & Mary		–		–		5	–	6	–	0
Syracuse		–		–		4	–	6	–	1
Richmond		–		–		4	–	7	–	0
Army		–		–		3	–	7	–	1
North Texas State		–		–		2	–	9	–	0
Georgia Tech		–		–		1	–	10	–	0
Memphis State		–		–		1	–	10	–	0
Rankings from AP Poll

The 1981 Miami Hurricanes football team represented the University of Miami as an independent during the 1981 NCAA Division I-A football season. Led by third-year head coach Howard Schnellenberger, the Hurricanes compiled a record of 9–2. The team played home games at the Miami Orange Bowl in Miami.

== Schedule ==
Date	Opponent	Rank	Site	TV	Result	Attendance	Source
September 5	No. 17 Florida		Miami Orange Bowl; Miami, FL (rivalry)		W 21–20	73,817	
September 19	Houston	No. 16	Miami Orange Bowl; Miami, FL		W 12–7	32,586	
September 26	at No. 4 Texas	No. 14	Texas Memorial Stadium; Austin, TX		L 7–14	74,653	
October 3	Vanderbilt	No. 17	Miami Orange Bowl; Miami, FL		W 48–16	27,694	
October 17	at No. 16 Mississippi State	No. 13	Scott Field; Starkville, MS		L 10–14	33,225	
October 24	at East Carolina		Ficklen Memorial Stadium; Greenville, NC		W 31–6	20,323	
October 31	No. 1 Penn State^{†}		Miami Orange Bowl; Miami, FL	ABC	W 17–14	32,117	
November 7	at No. 14 Florida State	No. 13	Doak Campbell Stadium; Tallahassee, FL (rivalry)	ABC	W 27–19	52,685	
November 14	Virginia Tech	No. 12	Miami Orange Bowl; Miami, FL (rivalry)		W 21–14	22,257	
November 21	at NC State	No. 11	Carter–Finley Stadium; Raleigh, NC		W 14–6	36,500	
November 27	Notre Dame	No. 9	Miami Orange Bowl; Miami, FL (rivalry)	ABC	W 37–15	50,681	
^{†}Homecoming; Rankings from AP Poll released prior to the game

== Game summaries ==
=== Penn State ===
Penn State Nittany Lions at Miami (FL) Hurricanes

Quarter	1	2	3	4	Total
Penn State	0	0	0	14	14
Miami (FL)	6	8	0	3	17

at Orange Bowl • Miami, Florida

- Date: October 31
- Game attendance: 32,117

Game information
- MIA - Miller 28 yard field goal
- MIA - Miller 42 yard field goal
- MIA - Brodsky 80 yard pass from Kelly (pass good)
- MIA - Miller 23 yard field goal
- PSU - McCloskey 13 yard pass from Blackledge (pass failed)
- PSU - Williams 26 yard pass from Blackledge (pass good)

Penn State

- Blackledge 26/41, 358 Yds, 2 TD, 2 INT
- Meade 11 Rush, 40 Yds
- Williams 8 Rec, 119 Yds, TD

Miami (FL)

- Kelly 13/25, 220 Yds, TD
- Roan 16 Rush, 50 Yds
- Brodsky 2 Rec, 100 Yds, TD

=== At Florida State ===
Miami (FL) Hurricanes at Florida State Seminoles

Quarter	1	2	3	4	Total
Miami (FL)	3	7	3	14	27
Florida St	6	7	0	6	19

at Doak Campbell Stadium, Tallahassee, Florida

- Date: November 7
- Game attendance: 52,685
- Recap/Box

Game information

First quarter

- FSU – Tony Johnson 12-yard pass from Rick Stockstill (kick blocked), 10:38. Florida St 6–0. Drive:
- MIA – Dan Miller 32-yard field goal, 4:42. Florida St 6–3. Drive:

Second quarter

- MIA – 1-yard run (Dan Miller kick), 12:46. Miami (FL) 10–6. Drive:
- FSU – Greg Allen 2-yard run (Mike Rendina kick), 5:43. Florida St 13–10. Drive:

Third quarter

- MIA – Dan Miller 57-yard field goal, 7:38. Tie 13–13. Drive:

Fourth quarter

- MIA – Smokey Roan 6-yard run (Dan Miller kick), 10:47. Miami (FL) 20–13. Drive:
- MIA – Speedy Neal 23-yard pass from Jim Kelly (Dan Miller kick), 8:54. Miami (FL) 27–13. Drive:
- FSU – Sam Childers 7-yard pass from Rick Stockstill (pass failed), 6:46. Miami (FL) 27–19. Drive:

Top passers

- MIA – Jim Kelly – 22/41, 273 yards, TD
- FSU – Rick Stockstill – 17/36, 173 yards, 2 TD, INT

Top rushers

- MIA
- FSU – Greg Allen – 23 rushes, 109 yards, TD

Top receivers

- MIA
- FSU – Tony Johnson – 4 receptions, 53 yards, TD

== Personnel ==
=== Roster ===
1981 Miami Hurricanes football team roster
Players
Coaches
Offense

Pos.	#	Name	Class
C	61	Don Bailey	So
TE	84	Andy Baratta	Jr
OL	58	Clem Barbarino	Sr
WR	20	Rocky Belk	Jr
RB	16	Albert Bentley	So
RB	45	Gary Breckner	Jr
WR	43	Larry Brodsky	Sr
OT	53	John Canei	Jr
WR	19	Keith Cleveland	So
OT	78	Mark Cooper	Jr
WR	25	David Deakins	Jr
TE	86	Glenn Dennison	So
OL	79	Frank Frazier	Sr
RB	44	Keith Griffin	So
FB	33	Chris Hobbs	Sr
QB	12	Jim Kelly	Jr
OL	67	Eric Larkin	So
OL	50	Mike Moore	So
FB	38	Speedy Neal	So
QB	9	Mark Richt	Jr
RB	46	Smokey Roan	Sr
WR	6	Mike Rodrigue	Sr
RB	49	Mark Rush	Jr
OL	60	David Stewart	Sr
WR	22	Lawrence Thompson	So
OL	72	Alvin Ward	Fr
OT	63	Bill Welch	Jr

Defense

Pos.	#	Name	Class
DB	4	Rodney Bellinger	So
DB	14	Jamie Boone	Jr
LB	54	Jay Brophy	So
DT	80	Willie Broughton	Fr
DE	41	Danny Brown	So
LB	93	Greg Brown	Jr
DB	2	Ken Calhoun	Fr
DT	64	Dallas Cameron	Fr
DT	71	Tony Chickillo	Jr
DB	15	Dave Ditthardt	Fr
DE	87	Leon Evans	Jr
DE	90	Tim Flanagan	Sr
DE	57	Ron Harris	Fr
DB	37	David Jefferson	Sr
DB	27	Greg Jones	Fr
DB	17	Ronnie Lippett	Jr
DB	31	Fred Marion	Sr
DT	91	Bob Nelson	Sr
LB	66	Scott Nicolas	Sr
DE	55	Isaiah West	Jr
DT	73	Lester Williams	Sr
LB	65	Greg Zappala	Jr

Special teams

Pos.	#	Name	Class
K	3	Jeff Davis	Jr
P	5	Greg LaBelle	Jr
K	1	Dan Miller	Sr

Head coach

- Howard Schnellenberger

Coordinators/assistant coaches

Legend

- (C) Team captain
- (S) Suspended
- (I) Ineligible
- Injured
- Redshirt

=== Starters ===
==== Offense ====
POS	Name	Name
QB	Jim Kelly	
HB	Smokey Roan	Keith Griffin
FB	Chris Hobbs	Speedy Neal
WR	Larry Brodsky	
WR	Mike Rodrique	
TE	Glenn Dennison	Mark Cooper
T	Dave Stewart	Bill Welch
G	Mike Moore	
C	Don Bailey	
G	Clem Barbarino	
T	John Canei	Frank Frazier

==== Defense ====
POS	Name	Name
DL	Isaiah West	
DL	Lester Williams	
DL	Bob Nelson	
DL	Tony Chickillo	
DL	Tim Flanagan	Danny Brown
LB	Scott Nicolas	Greg Brown
LB	Jay Brophy	Joe Walker
DB	Dave Ditthardt	Angelo Holmes
DB	Ronnie Lippett	
DB	David Jefferson	Jamie Boone
DB	Fred Marion	Ken Calhoun

=== Coaching staff ===
Name	Position	Seasons	Alma mater
Howard Schnellenberger	Head coach	3rd	Kentucky (1957)
Kim Helton	Offensive coordinator/offensive line	3rd	John Carroll (1965)
Tom Olivadotti	Defensive coordinator/linebackers	2nd	Upsala (19##)
Gary Stevens	Wide receivers	2nd	John Carroll (1965)
Hubbard Alexander	Tight ends	3rd	Tennessee State (1962)
Joe Brodsky	Running backs	4th	Florida (1956)
Harold Allen	Defensive line	17th	Miami (1953)
Chris Vagotis	Defensive ends	2nd	Alabama (19##)
Earl Morrall	Quarterbacks	3rd	Michigan State (1956)
Bill Trout	Defensive line	6th	Miami (19##)
Mike Archer	Defensive backs	2nd	Miami (1976)

=== Support staff ===
Name	Position	Seasons	Alma mater
Ray Ganong	Strength & conditioning	3rd	Miami (1977)
Mike Rodriguez	Volunteer assistant	3rd	
Marc Trestman	Volunteer assistant	1st	Minnesota (1979)

== Statistics ==
=== Passing ===
Player	Comp	Att	Yards	TD	INT
Jim Kelly	168	285	2,403	13	14

=== Rushing ===
Player	Att	Yards	TD
Smokey Roan	111	388	
Chris Hobbs	75	295	
Speedy Neal	58	209	

=== Receiving ===
Player	Rec	Yards	TD
Larry Brodsky	37	631	
Mike Rodrique	29	478	
Glenn Dennison	29	270	

== 1982 NFL draft ==
Player	Position	Round	Pick	NFL club
Lester Williams	Defensive tackle	1	27	New England Patriots
Fred Marion	Defensive back	5	112	New England Patriots
Bob Nelson	Defensive tackle	5	120	Miami Dolphins
David Jefferson	Defensive back	9	228	Seattle Seahawks
Larry Brodsky	Wide receiver	10	268	Kansas City Chiefs
Dan Miller	Kicker	11	281	Washington Redskins
Scott Nicolas	Linebacker	12	310	Cleveland Browns
Mike Rodrigue	Wide receiver	12	331	Miami Dolphins
