= 1981 Tulane Green Wave football team =

American college football season

1981 Tulane Green Wave football
- Conference: Independent
- Record: 6–5
- Head coach: Vince Gibson (2nd season)
- Offensive coordinator: Ken Meyer (1st season)
- Home stadium: Louisiana Superdome

1981 NCAA Division I-A independents football records
	Conf.					Overall
Team	W		L		T	W		L		T
No. 4 Pittsburgh		–		–		11	–	1	–	0
No. 3 Penn State		–		–		10	–	2	–	0
No. 8 Miami (FL)		–		–		9	–	2	–	0
Southern Miss		–		–		9	–	2	–	1
No. 17 West Virginia		–		–		9	–	3	–	0
Colgate		–		–		7	–	3	–	0
Virginia Tech		–		–		7	–	4	–	0
Navy		–		–		7	–	4	–	1
Cincinnati		–		–		6	–	5	–	0
Florida State		–		–		6	–	5	–	0
Holy Cross		–		–		6	–	5	–	0
Tulane		–		–		6	–	5	–	0
UNLV		–		–		6	–	6	–	0
South Carolina		–		–		6	–	6	–	0
Temple		–		–		5	–	5	–	0
Boston College		–		–		5	–	6	–	0
East Carolina		–		–		5	–	6	–	0
Northeast Louisiana		–		–		5	–	6	–	0
Louisville		–		–		5	–	6	–	0
Notre Dame		–		–		5	–	6	–	0
Rutgers		–		–		5	–	6	–	0
William & Mary		–		–		5	–	6	–	0
Syracuse		–		–		4	–	6	–	1
Richmond		–		–		4	–	7	–	0
Army		–		–		3	–	7	–	1
North Texas State		–		–		2	–	9	–	0
Georgia Tech		–		–		1	–	10	–	0
Memphis State		–		–		1	–	10	–	0
Rankings from AP Poll

The 1981 Tulane Green Wave football team was an American football team that represented Tulane University during the 1981 NCAA Division I-A football season. In their second year under head coach Vince Gibson, the team compiled a 6–5 record.

== Schedule ==
Date	Opponent	Site	Result	Attendance	Source
September 5	Ole Miss	Louisiana Superdome; New Orleans, LA (rivalry)	L 18–19	43,685	
September 12	Clemson	Louisiana Superdome; New Orleans, LA	L 5–13	45,736	
September 19	at Southern Miss	M. M. Roberts Stadium; Hattiesburg, MS (rivalry)	L 3–21	32,756	
October 3	at Rice	Rice Stadium; Houston, TX	L 16–20	17,000	
October 10	Vanderbilt	Louisiana Superdome; New Orleans, LA	W 14–10	32,431	
October 17	at Air Force	Falcon Stadium; Colorado Springs, CO	W 31–13	18,467	
October 24	Georgia Tech	Louisiana Superdome; New Orleans, LA	W 27–10	37,431	
October 31	at Cincinnati	Nippert Stadium; Cincinnati, OH	L 13–17	19,486	
November 7	Maryland	Louisiana Superdome; New Orleans, LA	W 14–7	32,474	
November 14	at Memphis State	Liberty Bowl Memorial Stadium; Memphis, TN	W 24–7	14,827	
November 28	LSU	Louisiana Superdome; New Orleans, LA (Battle for the Rag)	W 48–7	71,546	

== Roster ==
1981 Tulane Green Wave football team roster
Players
Coaches
Offense

Pos.	#	Name	Class
OT	77	Jim Boyle	Jr
QB	9	Paul Catanese	Sr
QB	10	Larry Copeland	So
WR	28	Nolan Franz	Sr
TE	87	Rodney Holman	Sr
RB	24	Marvin Lewis	Sr
OT	76	Don Maggs	So
RB/KR	23	Greg Liggett	Jr

Defense

Pos.	#	Name	Class
DT	79	Jerry Baker	Sr
LB	90	Sylvester McGrew	Sr
DB	14	Treg Songy	Fr
DB	8	Lionel Washington	Jr
LB	80	Clinton Wetzel	So

Special teams

Pos.	#	Name	Class
RB/KR	23	Greg Liggett	Jr

Head coach

- Vince Gibson

Coordinators/assistant coaches

Legend

- (C) Team captain
- (S) Suspended
- (I) Ineligible
- Injured
- Redshirt
