= 1981 UNLV Rebels football team =

American college football season

1981 UNLV Rebels football
- Conference: Independent
- Record: 6–6
- Head coach: Tony Knap (6th season)
- Home stadium: Las Vegas Silver Bowl

1981 NCAA Division I-A independents football records
	Conf.					Overall
Team	W		L		T	W		L		T
No. 4 Pittsburgh		–		–		11	–	1	–	0
No. 3 Penn State		–		–		10	–	2	–	0
No. 8 Miami (FL)		–		–		9	–	2	–	0
Southern Miss		–		–		9	–	2	–	1
No. 17 West Virginia		–		–		9	–	3	–	0
Colgate		–		–		7	–	3	–	0
Virginia Tech		–		–		7	–	4	–	0
Navy		–		–		7	–	4	–	1
Cincinnati		–		–		6	–	5	–	0
Florida State		–		–		6	–	5	–	0
Holy Cross		–		–		6	–	5	–	0
Tulane		–		–		6	–	5	–	0
UNLV		–		–		6	–	6	–	0
South Carolina		–		–		6	–	6	–	0
Temple		–		–		5	–	5	–	0
Boston College		–		–		5	–	6	–	0
East Carolina		–		–		5	–	6	–	0
Northeast Louisiana		–		–		5	–	6	–	0
Louisville		–		–		5	–	6	–	0
Notre Dame		–		–		5	–	6	–	0
Rutgers		–		–		5	–	6	–	0
William & Mary		–		–		5	–	6	–	0
Syracuse		–		–		4	–	6	–	1
Richmond		–		–		4	–	7	–	0
Army		–		–		3	–	7	–	1
North Texas State		–		–		2	–	9	–	0
Georgia Tech		–		–		1	–	10	–	0
Memphis State		–		–		1	–	10	–	0
Rankings from AP Poll

The 1981 UNLV Rebels football team was an American football team that represented the University of Nevada, Las Vegas as an independent during the 1981 NCAA Division I-A football season. In their sixth and final year under head coach Tony Knap, the team compiled a 6–6 record.

A notable win was the road victory over eighth-ranked BYU in October, who were without starting quarterback Jim McMahon, replaced by sophomore Steve Young.

Approaching age 67, Knap retired after the season, and was succeeded by Harvey Hyde, the head coach at Pasadena City College.

== Schedule ==
Date	Opponent	Site	Result	Attendance	Source
September 5	at San Jose State	Spartan Stadium; San Jose, CA	W 16–6	17,112	
September 12	New Mexico	Las Vegas Silver Bowl; Whitney, NV	W 49–42	25,605	
September 19	West Texas State	Las Vegas Silver Bowl; Whitney, NV	L 17–21	24,560	
September 26	Long Beach State	Las Vegas Silver Bowl; Whitney, NV	W 32–31	25,080	
October 3	at Wyoming	War Memorial Stadium; Laramie, WY	L 21–45	23,793	
October 10	at No. 8 BYU	Cougar Stadium; Provo, UT	W 45–41	39,852	
October 24	Utah	Las Vegas Silver Bowl; Whitney, NV	L 28–69	27,883	
October 31	at Hawaii	Aloha Stadium; Halawa, HI	L 21–57	46,153	
November 7	at Fresno State	Ratcliffe Stadium; Fresno, CA	L 26–42	16,241	
November 14	San Diego State	Las Vegas Silver Bowl; Whitney, NV	L 20–38	23,090	
November 21	Air Force	Las Vegas Silver Bowl; Whitney, NV	W 24–21	22,574	
November 28	at UTEP	Sun Bowl; El Paso, TX	W 27–20	2,312	
Rankings from AP Poll released prior to the game

== Roster ==
1981 UNLV Rebels football team roster
Players
Coaches
Offense

Pos.	#	Name	Class
FB	24	Mel Carver	Sr
FB	21	Ray Crouse	Sr
QB	12	Randall Cunningham	Fr
QB	1	Sam King	Sr
OT	71	Dan McQuaid	Jr
RB	23	Michael Morton	Sr
WR	11	Mike Reed	Sr
TE	88	Jeff Spek	Jr

Defense

Pos.	#	Name	Class
DB	4	Bruce Cunningham	Jr
DB	2	Wymon Henderson	Jr
DB	43	Keyvan Jenkins	So
DE		Todd Liebenstein	Sr
DT	76	Aaron Moog	So

Special teams

Pos.	#	Name	Class

Head coach

- Tony Knap (6th year)

Coordinators/assistant coaches

Legend

- (C) Team captain
- (S) Suspended
- (I) Ineligible
- Injured
- Redshirt
