= 1981 Florida State Seminoles football team =

American college football season

1981 Florida State Seminoles football
- Conference: Independent
- Record: 6–5
- Head coach: Bobby Bowden (6th season)
- Offensive coordinator: George Henshaw (3rd season)
- Offensive scheme: Pro-style
- Defensive coordinator: Jack Stanton (6th season)
- Base defense: 4–3
- Captains: James Harris; James Gilbert; Rohn Stark; Michael Whiting; Rick Stockstill
- Home stadium: Doak Campbell Stadium

1981 NCAA Division I-A independents football records
	Conf.					Overall
Team	W		L		T	W		L		T
No. 4 Pittsburgh		–		–		11	–	1	–	0
No. 3 Penn State		–		–		10	–	2	–	0
No. 8 Miami (FL)		–		–		9	–	2	–	0
Southern Miss		–		–		9	–	2	–	1
No. 17 West Virginia		–		–		9	–	3	–	0
Colgate		–		–		7	–	3	–	0
Virginia Tech		–		–		7	–	4	–	0
Navy		–		–		7	–	4	–	1
Cincinnati		–		–		6	–	5	–	0
Florida State		–		–		6	–	5	–	0
Holy Cross		–		–		6	–	5	–	0
Tulane		–		–		6	–	5	–	0
UNLV		–		–		6	–	6	–	0
South Carolina		–		–		6	–	6	–	0
Temple		–		–		5	–	5	–	0
Boston College		–		–		5	–	6	–	0
East Carolina		–		–		5	–	6	–	0
Northeast Louisiana		–		–		5	–	6	–	0
Louisville		–		–		5	–	6	–	0
Notre Dame		–		–		5	–	6	–	0
Rutgers		–		–		5	–	6	–	0
William & Mary		–		–		5	–	6	–	0
Syracuse		–		–		4	–	6	–	1
Richmond		–		–		4	–	7	–	0
Army		–		–		3	–	7	–	1
North Texas State		–		–		2	–	9	–	0
Georgia Tech		–		–		1	–	10	–	0
Memphis State		–		–		1	–	10	–	0
Rankings from AP Poll

The 1981 Florida State Seminoles football team represented Florida State University as an independent during the 1981 NCAA Division I-A football season. Led by sixth-year head coach Bobby Bowden, the Seminoles compiled a record of 6–5. Florida State played home games at Doak Campbell Stadium in Tallahassee, Florida.

== Schedule ==
Date	Time	Opponent	Rank	Site	TV	Result	Attendance	Source
September 5	7:00 p.m.	Louisville	No. 19	Doak Campbell Stadium; Tallahassee, FL		W 17–0	50,735	
September 12	7:00 p.m.	Memphis State	No. 18	Doak Campbell Stadium; Tallahassee, FL		W 10–5	51,454	
September 19	2:30 p.m.	at No. 17 Nebraska	No. 19	Memorial Stadium; Lincoln, NE		L 14–34	76,289	
October 3	1:30 p.m.	at No. 7 Ohio State		Ohio Stadium; Columbus, OH		W 36–27	87,158	
October 10	2:30 p.m.	at Notre Dame	No. 20	Notre Dame Stadium; Notre Dame, IN (rivalry)		W 19–13	59,075	
October 17	1:30 p.m.	at No. 3 Pittsburgh	No. 11	Pitt Stadium; Pittsburgh, PA		L 14–42	52,112	
October 24	8:30 p.m.	at LSU	No. 20	Tiger Stadium; Baton Rouge, LA		W 38–14	74,816	
October 31	7:00 p.m.	Western Carolina^{†}	No. 17	Doak Campbell Stadium; Tallahassee, FL		W 56–31	52,721	
November 7	12:00 p.m.	No. 13 Miami (FL)	No. 14	Doak Campbell Stadium; Tallahassee, FL (rivalry)	ABC	L 19–27	52,685	
November 14	3:30 p.m.	No. 14 Southern Miss	No. 20	Doak Campbell Stadium; Tallahassee, FL	ABC	L 14–58	51,819	
November 28	1:30 p.m.	at Florida		Florida Field; Gainesville, FL (rivalry)		L 3–35	64,437	
^{†}Homecoming; Rankings from AP Poll released prior to the game; All times are in Eastern time

== Personnel ==
1981 Florida State Seminoles football team roster
Players
Coaches
Offense

Pos.	#	Name	Class
RB		Billy Allen
RB	26	Greg Allen	Fr
OL		Tom Brannon
RB		Ken Burnett
TE	84	Sam Childers	Sr
OL		Redus Coggin
RB		Darish Davis
G	68	Jeff Field	Sr
OL	97	Tim Flasher	Fr
OL		Herbert Harp
WR	4	Jessie Hester	Fr
WR	22	Hardis Johnson	Jr
WR	82	Long Johnson	So
WR		Tony Johnson
RB	41	Cedric Jones	Fr
QB		Kelly Lowery
OL		Tom McCormick
WR	6	Dennis McKinnon	Jr
OL		Bob Merson
TE	81	Zeke Mowatt	Jr
WR	2	Steve Nicklaus	Fr
OL	77	Chris Nickrenz	So
OL		Ricky Render
QB	11	Rick Stockstill	Sr
WR		Weegie Thompson
OT	73	Barry Voltapetti	Sr
TE		Tom Wheeler
FB	27	Michael Whiting	Sr
QB		Blair Williams
WR		Phil Williams
RB		Ricky Williams

Defense

Pos.	#	Name	Class
DB		Tracy Ashley
DL		Allen Campbell
DT	76	Alphonso Carreker	So
DL	68	Lenny Chavers	Fr
DB	24	Harvey Clayton	Jr
DL		Jarvis Coursey
DE	98	Brad Fojtik	So
DT	79	Garry Futch	Sr
NG	51	James Gilbert	Sr
DE	65	Darryl Gray	Fr
DB	9	Warren Hanna	Jr
DT	97	Herbert Harp	So
DB	33	James Harris	Sr
DB	30	Larry Harris	So
DB	40	Gary Henry	Sr
LB		Ron Hester
DE	86	John McLean	So
DE	60	Scott McLean	Sr
DB		Eric Riley
DL		Mike Rodrique
LB		Ken Roe
LB		Henry Taylor
LB		Tommy Young

Special teams

Pos.	#	Name	Class
K	7	Mike Rendina	Fr
P	3	Rohn Stark	Sr

Head coach

- Bobby Bowden

Coordinators/assistant coaches

- George Henshaw (OC)
- Jack Stanton (DC)

Legend

- (C) Team captain
- (S) Suspended
- (I) Ineligible
- Injured
- Redshirt

== Season summary ==
Florida State finished with a 6–5 record and were not invited to a Bowl game. The Seminoles' offense scored 240 points while the defense allowed 286 points. The Seminoles played a murderers row schedule on the road, as in consecutive weeks, they played at #17 Nebraska, at #7 Ohio State, at Notre Dame, at #3 Pittsburgh and at LSU. Greg Allen led the team in rushing with 888 yards. Rick Stockstill led the team in passing with 1356 yards and 11 touchdown passes. Michael Whiting led the team in receptions with 29. Phil Williams led the team in receiving yards with 413. Harvey Clayton led the team with 5 pass interceptions. Jarvis Coursey {DE}, Tim McCormick {C}, Rohn Stark {P} and Barry Voltapetti {OT} were selected to the First team All-South Independent team. Rohn Stark was selected as a First team All-American. Greg Allen {RB}, Garry Futch {G}, McCormick and Voltapetti were named as Honorable Mention All-Americans by the Associated Press. Stark {Baltimore Colts}, Ron Hester {LB}, {Miami} and Mike Whiting {RB} {Dallas} were selected in the 1982 NFL draft.

=== Louisville ===
Florida State eked out a 17–0 victory over Louisville, but it wasn't easy. Frustrated throughout by a Louisville defense led by tackle Richard Tharpe, the Seminoles staggered and stumbled most of the way. Four times Tharpe got through and sacked quarterback Rick Stockstill. It was 10-0 after the first quarter, as Mike Rendina kicked a 24-yard field goal and Stockstill hit Jessie Hester with an 11-yard scoring pass. With seven minutes left, Billy Allen broke away on a pitchout for a 50-yard scoring run to ice it. Allen ran the ball eight times for 89 yards. Louisville threatened numerous times only to be denied by the Seminole defense. FSU held the Cardinals to 133 yards of total offense.

=== Memphis State ===
Florida State's offense managed to get a touchdown and a field goal on the board. Memphis State stayed in it to the end before falling 10–5. Late in the 1st quarter the Seminoles moved on a 77-yard drive for the only touchdown that came on Mike Whiting's 3 yard run in the first moments of the 2nd quarter. That erased a 2–0 deficit, which came when Rick Stockstill was trapped in the end zone by Cedric Wright on FSU's second series of the evening. Early in the 4th quarter Mike Rendina kicked a 46-yard field goal to make it 10–2. A few minutes later Gregg Hauss put through a 27 yarder for 3 points and the final score. Larry Harris intercepted a pass with 4 seconds remaining, did the Seminoles have this one wrapped up.

=== At Nebraska ===
Nebraska held a close 10–7 lead at halftime, but the momentum quickly turned in favor of the Cornhuskers when WB Irving Fryar scored on an 82-yard punt return, followed up six game clock seconds later when DE Tony Felici's off-the-bench opportunity allowed him to recover a Florida State fumble on the kickoff and return it 13 yards for another touchdown. Nebraska sealed the deal on a 94-yard touchdown run by IB Roger Craig.

=== Ohio State ===
The Seminoles knocked #7 Ohio State from the unbeaten ranks 36–27. Rick Stockstill completed 25 of 41 passes for 299 yards and two touchdowns. Stockstill directed two third quarter drives to touchdowns that were the difference. The first covered 88 yards in 11 plays, the second 99 in nine. The Seminoles increased their 23-21 halftime lead as a result of these drives. No bigger play was Ron Hester's blocked punt that he returned 35 yards for a touchdown in the 2nd quarter. Stockstill's TD passes were to Tony Johnson (13 yards) and Sam Childers (7 yards). Kelly Lowery and Ricky Williams had touchdown runs for the Seminoles.

=== At Notre Dame ===
Florida State Seminoles, in their first ever visit to Notre Dame Stadium, left with a 19–13 victory. Mike Rendina kicked two field goals and Michael Whiting scored both the Seminoles touchdowns, a 17-yard pass from Rick Stockstill and a 5-yard pass from Stockstill. Ricky Williams ran for 135 yards. Stockstill passed for only 100 yards but his two TD passes were the difference in the game.

=== At Pittsburgh ===
1. 3 ranked Pittsburgh dominated every phase of the game and routed Florida State 42-14 before a crowd of 55,112 at Pitt Stadium. Pitt's Dan Marino, threw for 215 yards and touchdowns of 22, 65, and 18 yards. Michael Whiting ran 1 yard for a touchdown and Sam Childers caught a 5-yard TD pass from Blair Williams. Pittsburgh rolled up 503 yards of total offense.

=== At LSU ===
Florida State crushed Louisiana State 38-14 before over 74,000 homecoming fans at Tiger Stadium. Offense, defense and special teams all contributed in the rout. Harvey Clayton had an interception and a 48-yard punt return. James Harris had 3 sacks, Warren Hanna blocked a punt and Billy Allen returned a kickoff 97 yards for a touchdown. Greg Allen and Cedric Jones ran for touchdowns. Allen rushed for 202 yards, a new school record. Rick Stockstill passed for two touchdowns, one to Dennis McKinnon (22 yards) and one to Phil Williams (12 yards).

=== Western Carolina ===
A homecoming crowd of over 52,000 at Doak Campbell Stadium was treated to an offensive show by both squads. It featured 623 yards of total offense by the Seminoles and 437 yards by Western Carolina. Greg Allen's 322 yards of rushing on 32 carries was the single-game best in college football this season, and shattered his own FSU record of 202 yards that be set a week ago at LSU. Allen had a 5-yard touchdown run and a 95-yard kickoff return for a touchdown. Michael Whiting ran for two touchdowns and Mike Rendina kicked two field goals. Dennis McKinnon, Tony Johnson and Cedric Jones had touchdowns for the Seminoles.

=== Miami (FL) ===
The Seminole kicking game was missing as they had two field goal attempts and an extra point blocked. The Noles and the Canes were tied 13-13 heading into the 4th quarter. Smokey Roan scored from 6 yards out for a 20-13 Hurricane lead. The Seminoles still had 10:47 left to come back, but two plays later Rick Stockstill's slant pass was tipped and intercepted by Ronnie Tippett. Jim Kelly threw to Speedy Neal and broke two tackles on the way to the end zone for a 27–13 lead with 8:54 left. The Seminoles closed to 27–19 on a Stockstill 7 yard TD pass to Sam Childers.

Miami (FL) Hurricanes at Florida State Seminoles

Quarter	1	2	3	4	Total
Miami (FL)	3	7	3	14	27
Florida St	6	7	0	6	19

at Doak Campbell Stadium, Tallahassee, Florida

- Date: November 7
- Game attendance: 52,685
- Recap/Box

Game information

First quarter

- FSU – Tony Johnson 12-yard pass from Rick Stockstill (kick blocked), 10:38. Florida St 6–0. Drive:
- MIA – Dan Miller 32-yard field goal, 4:42. Florida St 6–3. Drive:

Second quarter

- MIA – 1-yard run (Dan Miller kick), 12:46. Miami (FL) 10–6. Drive:
- FSU – Greg Allen 2-yard run (Mike Rendina kick), 5:43. Florida St 13–10. Drive:

Third quarter

- MIA – Dan Miller 57-yard field goal, 7:38. Tie 13–13. Drive:

Fourth quarter

- MIA – Smokey Roan 6-yard run (Dan Miller kick), 10:47. Miami (FL) 20–13. Drive:
- MIA – Speedy Neal 23-yard pass from Jim Kelly (Dan Miller kick), 8:54. Miami (FL) 27–13. Drive:
- FSU – Sam Childers 7-yard pass from Rick Stockstill (pass failed), 6:46. Miami (FL) 27–19. Drive:

Top passers

- MIA – Jim Kelly – 22/41, 273 yards, TD
- FSU – Rick Stockstill – 17/36, 173 yards, 2 TD, INT

Top rushers

- MIA
- FSU – Greg Allen – 23 rushes, 109 yards, TD

Top receivers

- MIA
- FSU – Tony Johnson – 4 receptions, 53 yards, TD

The loss snapped Florida State's 19-game home winning streak.

=== Southern Miss ===
Florida State crashed and burned before 51,819 spectators at Doak Campbell Stadium. Southern Miss did whatever they pleased in a 58–14 rout and moved to 9-0-1 on the season. The Seminoles trailed 51-0 before they finally got on the scoreboard with a Dennis McKinnon 50 yard TD reception from Blair Williams. Tom Wheeler caught a 6-yard TD pass from Williams to close out the scoring for the game.

=== At Florida ===
Florida took a 13–3 lead into halftime and then poured it on in the 2nd half on the way to a 35–3 victory over the Seminoles. Wayne Peace threw four touchdown passes, including two to Mike Mularkey. Brian Clark added two field goals for the Gators. The Gators dominated the game from the opening drive to the final gun and won for the first time over Florida State since 1976.
