= 1981 Notre Dame Fighting Irish football team =

American college football season

1981 Notre Dame Fighting Irish football
- Conference: Independent
- Record: 5–6
- Head coach: Gerry Faust (1st season)
- Offensive coordinator: Tom Lichtenberg (1st season)
- Defensive coordinator: Jim Johnson
- Captains: Bob Crable; Phil Carter
- Home stadium: Notre Dame Stadium

1981 NCAA Division I-A independents football records
	Conf.					Overall
Team	W		L		T	W		L		T
No. 4 Pittsburgh		–		–		11	–	1	–	0
No. 3 Penn State		–		–		10	–	2	–	0
No. 8 Miami (FL)		–		–		9	–	2	–	0
Southern Miss		–		–		9	–	2	–	1
No. 17 West Virginia		–		–		9	–	3	–	0
Colgate		–		–		7	–	3	–	0
Virginia Tech		–		–		7	–	4	–	0
Navy		–		–		7	–	4	–	1
Cincinnati		–		–		6	–	5	–	0
Florida State		–		–		6	–	5	–	0
Holy Cross		–		–		6	–	5	–	0
Tulane		–		–		6	–	5	–	0
UNLV		–		–		6	–	6	–	0
South Carolina		–		–		6	–	6	–	0
Temple		–		–		5	–	5	–	0
Boston College		–		–		5	–	6	–	0
East Carolina		–		–		5	–	6	–	0
Northeast Louisiana		–		–		5	–	6	–	0
Louisville		–		–		5	–	6	–	0
Notre Dame		–		–		5	–	6	–	0
Rutgers		–		–		5	–	6	–	0
William & Mary		–		–		5	–	6	–	0
Syracuse		–		–		4	–	6	–	1
Richmond		–		–		4	–	7	–	0
Army		–		–		3	–	7	–	1
North Texas State		–		–		2	–	9	–	0
Georgia Tech		–		–		1	–	10	–	0
Memphis State		–		–		1	–	10	–	0
Rankings from AP Poll

The 1981 Notre Dame Fighting Irish football team was an American football team that represented the University of Notre Dame as an independent during the 1981 NCAA Division I-A football season. In their first year under head coach Gerry Faust, the Irish compiled a 5–6 record, outscored opponents by a total of 232 to 160, and were unranked in the final AP and UPI polls. After defeating LSU in the season opener, the Irish were ranked No. 1 in the AP poll, but they lost four of the next five games and fell out of the rankings. They lost all five games against ranked opponents: No. 11 Michigan, No. 20 Florida State, No. 5 USC, No. 13 Penn State, and No. 9 Miami (FL). It was Notre Dame's first losing season since 1963.

Linebacker and co-captain Bob Crable was a consensus first-team pick on the 1981 All-America college football team. Defensive back John Krimm also received first-team All-America honors from multiple selectors. The team's statistical leaders included quarterback Blair Kiel (936 passing yards), running back and co-captain Phil Carter (727 rushing yards), wide receiver Joe Howard (463 receiving yards, 27.2-yard average), kicker Harry Oliver (46 points scored, 28 of 30 PAT, 5 of 13 field goals), and Crable (167 tackles, 16 tackles for loss).

The team played its home games at Notre Dame Stadium in Notre Dame, Indiana.

== Schedule ==
Date	Time	Opponent	Rank	Site	TV	Result	Attendance	Source
September 12	2:30 p.m.	LSU	No. 4	Notre Dame Stadium; Notre Dame, IN		W 27–9	59,075	
September 19	1:50 p.m.	at No. 11 Michigan	No. 1	Michigan Stadium; Ann Arbor, MI (rivalry)	ABC	L 7–25	105,888	
September 26	2:30 p.m.	at Purdue	No. 13	Ross–Ade Stadium; West Lafayette, IN (rivalry)		L 14–15	70,007	
October 3	2:30 p.m.	Michigan State		Notre Dame Stadium; Notre Dame, IN (rivalry)		W 20–7	59,075	
October 10	2:30 p.m.	No. 20 Florida State		Notre Dame Stadium; Notre Dame, IN (rivalry)		L 13–19	59,075	
October 24	2:30 p.m.	No. 5 USC		Notre Dame Stadium; Notre Dame, IN (rivalry)		L 7–14	59,075	
October 31	1:30 p.m.	Navy		Notre Dame Stadium; Notre Dame, IN (rivalry)		W 38–0	59,075	
November 7	1:30 p.m.	Georgia Tech		Notre Dame Stadium; Notre Dame, IN (rivalry)		W 35–3	59,075	
November 14	3:00 p.m.	at Air Force		Falcon Stadium; Colorado Springs, CO (rivalry)		W 35–7	36,800	
November 21	1:00 p.m.	at No. 13 Penn State		Beaver Stadium; University Park, PA (rivalry)		L 21–24	84,175	
November 27	3:00 p.m.	at No. 9 Miami (FL)		Miami Orange Bowl; Miami, FL (rivalry)	ABC	L 15–37	50,681	
Rankings from AP Poll released prior to the game; All times are in Eastern time

== Roster ==
1981 Notre Dame Fighting Irish football team roster
Players
Coaches
Offense

Pos.	#	Name	Class
TE	82	Mark Bavaro	Fr
RB	28	Greg Bell	So
RB		Phil Carter (C)	Jr
TE	85	Tony Hunter	Jr
QB	5	Blair Kiel	So
RB	39	Larry Moriarty	Jr
OT	71	Phil Pozderac	Sr
C	57	Mark Fischer	Jr
G	75	Larry Williams	Fr

Defense

Pos.	#	Name	Class
DB	9	Chris Brown	So
DT	91	Bob Clasby	Jr
LB	43	Bob Crable (C)	Sr
S	22	Dave Duerson	Jr
DE	78	Mike Gann	Fr
DT	55	Mike Golic	Fr
CB	19	John Krimm	Sr
CB	30	Stacey Toran	So

Special teams

Pos.	#	Name	Class
K	3	Herry Oliver	Sr

Head coach

- Gerry Faust

Coordinators/assistant coaches

- Tom Lichtenberg (OC)
- Jim Johnson (DC)

Legend

- (C) Team captain
- (S) Suspended
- (I) Ineligible
- Injured
- Redshirt

== Statistics ==
Passing

1. Blair Kiel - 67 of 151 (.444 completion percentage) for 936 yards, 7 touchdowns, 10 interceptions
2. Tim Koegel - 50 of 92 (.543 completion percentage) for 686 yards, 5 touchdowns, 4 interceptions

Rushing

1. Phil Carter - 727 yards, 4.4-yard average, 6 touchdowns
2. Greg Bell - 512 yards, 5.6-yard average, 4 touchdowns
3. John Sweeney - 168 yards, 4.7-yard average, 0 touchdowns
4. Chris Smith - 161 yards, 3.9-yard average, 1 touchdown
5. Mark Brooks - 126 yards, 5.2-yard average, 1 touchdown

Receiving

1. Tony Hunter - 28 receptions for 397 yards, 2 touchdowns
2. Joe Howard - 17 receptions for 463 yards, 3 touchdowns
3. Phil Carter - 14 receptions for 57 yards, 0 touchdowns
4. Dean Masztak - 13 receptions for 163 yards, 1 touchdown
5. Greg Bell - 11 receptions for 135 yards, 0 touchdowns
6. John Sweeney, 9 receptions for 124 yards, 1 touchdown

Scoring

1. Harry Oliver - 46 points, 28 of 30 PAT, 6 of 13 field goals
2. Phil Carter - 36 points, 6 touchdowns
3. Greg Bell - 30 points, 5 touchdowns
4. Joe Howard - 24 points, 4 touchdowns

Tackles

1. Bob Crable - 167
2. Mark Zavagnin - 94
3. Griffith - 63
4. Bob Clasby - 56
5. Dave Duerson - 55
6. Stacey Toran - 54

== 1982 NFL draft ==
The following Notre Dame players were selected in the 1982 NFL draft:

- Bob Crable - 1982 / Round: 1 / Pick: 23 New York Jets
- John Krimm - 1982 / Round: 3 / Pick: 76 New Orleans Saints
- Phil Pozderac - 1982 / Round: 5 / Pick: 137 Dallas Cowboys
