= Frank Navarro =

American football player and coach (1930–2021)

Biographical details
- Born: February 15, 1930; White Plains, New York, U.S.
- Died: May 30, 2021 (aged 91); Charleston, South Carolina, U.S.

Playing career
- 1950–1952: Maryland
- Position: Guard

Coaching career (HC unless noted)
- 1955: Columbia (OL)
- 1956: Williams (freshmen)
- 1957–1962: Williams (assistant)
- 1963–1967: Williams
- 1968–1973: Columbia
- 1974–1977: Wabash
- 1978–1984: Princeton

Head coaching record
- Overall: 99–99–6
- Tournaments: 2–1 (NCAA D-III playoffs)

Frank F. Navarro (February 15, 1930 – May 30, 2021) was an American college football player and coach. He served as the head football coach at Williams College from 1963 to 1967, Columbia University from 1968 to 1973, Wabash College from 1974 to 1977, and Princeton University from 1978 to 1984, compiling a career head coaching record of 99–99–6. Navarro graduated in 1953 from the University of Maryland, College Park, where he played on the Maryland Terrapins football as a guard under head coach, Jim Tatum.

== Coaching career ==
After serving a two-year stint in the United States Air Force, Navarro headed to Teachers College at Columbia University, where the head football coach Lou Little offered him the job of assistant offensive line coach under John F. Bateman in 1955. Little's offer ended Navarro's pursuit of teaching and put him on a path to a career in coaching.

Navarro joined the Williams College coaching staff in 1957 as an assistant to head coach, Len Watters, where Navarro introduced the “Monster Defense". In 1961 and 1962, the Ephs won 12 games and 8 of those wins came by shutting out the opposition. The "Monster Defense" was designed for the linemen to tie up the blockers and allow the linebackers to make the tackles. The monster defense featured a new technique: slanting defensive linemen. The monster, or the scrape linebacker, was the one who was targeted to make tackles after the linemen tied up the offensive line. Navarro succeeded Watters as head coach in 1963 amassed a record of 28–11–1 in five seasons, including a 7–0–1 mark in 1967, when he was named New England College Coach of the year. While Navarro was at Williams, Norman Rockwell used him as a model for his painting, "The Recruit".

After the 1967 season, Navarro left Williams to become the head football coach at Columbia. He led the Lions to an impressive 6–3 mark in 1971, with the three losses coming by a combined total of just eight points. 1971 was only the third winning campaign for Columbia since 1952. Navarro was named the New York Writers Association Eastern College Coach of the Year.

Navarro moved on to Wabash College in Crawfordsville, Indiana in 1974. During his four years there, he led the Wabash Little Giants to a combined 26–17 record, including an 18–5 mark over his final two seasons. Wabash had not had a winning season for ten consecutive years until Navarro led them to a 7–3 record in 1976. 1977 was even better as he directed the Little Giants to a 11–2 mark and a runner-up finish in the NCAA Division III Football Championship, where they lost a 39–36 shootout to Widener.

At Princeton, Navarro's most gratifying season was in 1981 when the Tigers finished 5–4–1, including a stunning 35–31 last-second win over defending Ivy League champion, Yale, snapping Princeton's 15-game losing streak to the rival Bulldogs. For his outstanding coaching performance in that game, Navarro was named UPI Coach of the Week. By beating Yale and tying Harvard (17–17), Princeton captured its first Big Three title since 1966. The Tigers's 5–1–1 Ivy mark was their best league record since they won a share of the title in 1969.

== Family ==
Navarro was married to Jill Navarro, they had 8 children and 22 grandchildren. He was of Italian descent, his parents entered the United States through Ellis Island.

Navarro's son, Ben Navarro is a businessman, the founder and CEO of Beemok Capital. His granddaughter Emma Navarro is a professional tennis player.

== Death ==
Navarro died at the age of 91, on May 30, 2021 in Charleston, South Carolina.

== Head coaching record ==
Year	Team	Overall	Conference	Standing	Bowl/playoffs
Williams Ephs (Little Three Conference) (1963–1967)
1963	Williams	2–6			
1964	Williams	7–1			
1965	Williams	6–2			
1966	Williams	6–2	0–2	3rd	
1967	Williams	7–0–1	2–0	1st	
Williams:		28–11–1			
Columbia Lions (Ivy League) (1968–1973)
1968	Columbia	2–7	2–5	6th	
1969	Columbia	1–8	1–6	T–7th	
1970	Columbia	3–6	1–6	T–7th	
1971	Columbia	6–3	5–2	3rd	
1972	Columbia	3–5–1	2–4–1	T–6th	
1973	Columbia	1–7–1	1–6	7th	
Columbia:		16–36–2	12–29–1		
Wabash Little Giants (Indiana Collegiate Conference) (1974–1975)
1974	Wabash	5–5	2–4	T–4th	
1975	Wabash	3–7	0–6	7th	
Wabash Little Giants (NCAA Division III independent) (1976–1977)
1976	Wabash	7–3			
1977	Wabash	11–2			L NCAA Division III Championship
Wabash:		26–17	2–8		
Princeton Tigers (Ivy League) (1978–1984)
1978	Princeton	2–5–2	1–4–2	7th	
1979	Princeton	5–4	5–2	T–2nd	
1980	Princeton	6–4	4–3	T–3rd	
1981	Princeton	5–4–1	5–1–1	3rd	
1982	Princeton	3–7	3–4	T–4th	
1983	Princeton	4–6	2–5	6th	
1984	Princeton	4–5	3–4	5th	
Princeton:		29–37–3	23–23–3		
Total:		99–99–6			
National championship Conference title Conference division title or championship game berth
