= 1981 Holy Cross Crusaders football team =

American college football season

1981 Holy Cross Crusaders football
- Conference: Independent
- Record: 6–5
- Head coach: Rick E. Carter (1st season)
- Defensive coordinator: Mark Duffner (1st season)
- Captains: John Andreoli; Dave Boisture; Wayne Thornton
- Home stadium: Fitton Field

1981 NCAA Division I-A independents football records
	Conf.					Overall
Team	W		L		T	W		L		T
No. 4 Pittsburgh		–		–		11	–	1	–	0
No. 3 Penn State		–		–		10	–	2	–	0
No. 8 Miami (FL)		–		–		9	–	2	–	0
Southern Miss		–		–		9	–	2	–	1
No. 17 West Virginia		–		–		9	–	3	–	0
Colgate		–		–		7	–	3	–	0
Virginia Tech		–		–		7	–	4	–	0
Navy		–		–		7	–	4	–	1
Cincinnati		–		–		6	–	5	–	0
Florida State		–		–		6	–	5	–	0
Holy Cross		–		–		6	–	5	–	0
Tulane		–		–		6	–	5	–	0
UNLV		–		–		6	–	6	–	0
South Carolina		–		–		6	–	6	–	0
Temple		–		–		5	–	5	–	0
Boston College		–		–		5	–	6	–	0
East Carolina		–		–		5	–	6	–	0
Northeast Louisiana		–		–		5	–	6	–	0
Louisville		–		–		5	–	6	–	0
Notre Dame		–		–		5	–	6	–	0
Rutgers		–		–		5	–	6	–	0
William & Mary		–		–		5	–	6	–	0
Syracuse		–		–		4	–	6	–	1
Richmond		–		–		4	–	7	–	0
Army		–		–		3	–	7	–	1
North Texas State		–		–		2	–	9	–	0
Georgia Tech		–		–		1	–	10	–	0
Memphis State		–		–		1	–	10	–	0
Rankings from AP Poll

The 1981 Holy Cross Crusaders football team was an American football team that represented the College of the Holy Cross as an independent during the 1981 NCAA Division I-A football season. The team was led by a new head coach, Rick E. Carter. The team compiled a record of 6–5.

This would be Holy Cross' last season in the NCAA's top level of competition. Shortly after the season ended, the NCAA reassigned the Crusaders, along with several other football teams, to Division I-AA now known as the Football Championship Subdivision.

All 1981 home games were played at Fitton Field on the Holy Cross campus in Worcester, Massachusetts.

== Schedule ==
Date	Opponent	Site	Result	Attendance	Source
September 12	Boston University	Fitton Field; Worcester, MA	W 14–6	5,000	
September 19	at UMass	Alumni Stadium; Hadley, MA	L 10–13	9,960	
September 26	at Harvard	Harvard Stadium; Boston, MA	W 33–19	17,000	
October 3	at Dartmouth	Memorial Field; Hanover, NH	W 28–0	7,203	
October 10	Yale^{†}	Fitton Field; Worcester, MA	L 28–29	21,601	
October 17	at Connecticut	Memorial Stadium; Storrs, CT	L 24–44	11,884	
October 24	Brown^	Fitton Field; Worcester, MA	W 34–24	14,792	
October 31	Columbia	Fitton Field; Worcester, MA	W 14–7	8,041	
November 7	at Army	Michie Stadium; West Point, NY	W 28–13	33,642	
November 14	Colgate	Fitton Field; Worcester, MA	L 13–34	17,241	
November 28	Boston College	Fitton Field; Worcester, MA (rivalry)	L 24–28	22,500	
^{†}Homecoming; ^ Family Weekend

== Statistical leaders ==
Statistical leaders for the 1981 Crusaders included:

- Rushing: Mark Covington, 763 yards and 11 touchdowns on 209 attempts
- Passing: Dave Boisture, 1,101 yards, 92 completions and 2 touchdowns on 178 attempts
- Receiving: Mike Redding, 363 yards on 31 receptions
- Scoring: Mark Covington, 66 points from 11 touchdowns
- Total offense: Dave Boisture, 1,254 yards (1,101 passing, 153 rushing)
- All-purpose yards: (tie) 785 yards for Andy Clivio (564 rushing, 208 returning, 13 receiving) and Mark Covington (763 rushing, 22 receiving)
- Interceptions: Rob Porter, 5 interceptions for 35 yards
- Tackles: Harry Flaherty, 101 total tackles
