= 1981 Virginia Tech Hokies football team =

American college football season

1981 Virginia Tech Hokies football
- Conference: Independent
- Record: 7–4
- Head coach: Bill Dooley (4th season)
- Defensive coordinator: John Gutekunst (1st season)
- Home stadium: Lane Stadium

1981 NCAA Division I-A independents football records
	Conf.					Overall
Team	W		L		T	W		L		T
No. 4 Pittsburgh		–		–		11	–	1	–	0
No. 3 Penn State		–		–		10	–	2	–	0
No. 8 Miami (FL)		–		–		9	–	2	–	0
Southern Miss		–		–		9	–	2	–	1
No. 17 West Virginia		–		–		9	–	3	–	0
Colgate		–		–		7	–	3	–	0
Virginia Tech		–		–		7	–	4	–	0
Navy		–		–		7	–	4	–	1
Cincinnati		–		–		6	–	5	–	0
Florida State		–		–		6	–	5	–	0
Holy Cross		–		–		6	–	5	–	0
Tulane		–		–		6	–	5	–	0
UNLV		–		–		6	–	6	–	0
South Carolina		–		–		6	–	6	–	0
Temple		–		–		5	–	5	–	0
Boston College		–		–		5	–	6	–	0
East Carolina		–		–		5	–	6	–	0
Northeast Louisiana		–		–		5	–	6	–	0
Louisville		–		–		5	–	6	–	0
Notre Dame		–		–		5	–	6	–	0
Rutgers		–		–		5	–	6	–	0
William & Mary		–		–		5	–	6	–	0
Syracuse		–		–		4	–	6	–	1
Richmond		–		–		4	–	7	–	0
Army		–		–		3	–	7	–	1
North Texas State		–		–		2	–	9	–	0
Georgia Tech		–		–		1	–	10	–	0
Memphis State		–		–		1	–	10	–	0
Rankings from AP Poll

The 1981 Virginia Tech Hokies football team was an American football team that represented Virginia Tech as an independent during the 1981 NCAA Division I-A football season. In their fourth year under head coach Bill Dooley, the Hokies compiled an overall record of 7–4.

== Schedule ==
Date	Opponent	Site	TV	Result	Attendance	Source
September 12	Richmond	Lane Stadium; Blacksburg, VA		W 28–12	30,200	
September 19	William & Mary	Lane Stadium; Blacksburg, VA		W 47–3	30,600	
September 26	Wake Forest	Lane Stadium; Blacksburg, VA		W 30–14	42,200	
October 3	Memphis State	Lane Stadium; Blacksburg, VA		W 17–13	40,100	
October 10	at Duke	Wallace Wade Stadium; Durham, NC		L 7–14	32,000	
October 17	at West Virginia	Mountaineer Field; Morgantown, WV (rivalry)		L 6–27	49,115	
October 24	Appalachian State^{†}	Lane Stadium; Blacksburg, VA		W 34–12	45,200	
October 31	at Kentucky	Commonwealth Stadium; Lexington, KY		W 29–3	54,500	
November 14	at No. 12 Miami (FL)	Miami Orange Bowl; Miami, FL (rivalry)		L 14–21	22,257	
November 21	VMI	Lane Stadium; Blacksburg, VA (rivalry)	ABC	L 0–6	21,100	
November 28	at Virginia	Scott Stadium; Charlottesville, VA (rivalry)		W 20–3	39,027	
^{†}Homecoming; Rankings from AP Poll released prior to the game

== Roster ==
1981 Virginia Tech Hokies football team roster
Players
Coaches
Offense

Pos.	#	Name	Class
QB	14	Jeff Bolton	Sr
WR	17	Jeff Dahl	Sr

Defense

Pos.	#	Name	Class
DE	17	Bobby Allen	Sr
DE	93	Robert Brown	Sr
DE	78	Bruce Smith	Fr

Special teams

Pos.	#	Name	Class
P	6	Bill Renner	Jr

Head coach

- Bill Dooley

Coordinators/assistant coaches

- John Gutekunst
  (Defensive coordinator & defensive ends coach)

Legend

- (C) Team captain
- (S) Suspended
- (I) Ineligible
- Injured
- Redshirt
