= 1981 Rutgers Scarlet Knights football team =

American college football season

1981 Rutgers Scarlet Knights football
- Conference: Independent
- Record: 5–6
- Head coach: Frank R. Burns (9th season)
- Defensive coordinator: George DeLeone (1st season)
- Home stadium: Rutgers Stadium; Giants Stadium

1981 Major eastern college football independents records
	Conf.					Overall
Team	W		L		T	W		L		T
No. 3 Penn State $	5	–	0	–	0	10	–	2	–	0
No. 4 Pittsburgh	5	–	1	–	0	11	–	1	–	0
No. 17 West Virginia	3	–	3	–	0	9	–	3	–	0
Temple	2	–	3	–	0	5	–	5	–	0
Syracuse	2	–	4	–	0	4	–	6	–	1
Boston College	1	–	4	–	0	5	–	6	–	0
Rutgers	1	–	4	–	0	5	–	6	–	0
$ – Lambert Trophy Winner; Rankings from AP Poll

1981 NCAA Division I-A independents football records
	Conf.					Overall
Team	W		L		T	W		L		T
No. 4 Pittsburgh		–		–		11	–	1	–	0
No. 3 Penn State		–		–		10	–	2	–	0
No. 8 Miami (FL)		–		–		9	–	2	–	0
Southern Miss		–		–		9	–	2	–	1
No. 17 West Virginia		–		–		9	–	3	–	0
Colgate		–		–		7	–	3	–	0
Virginia Tech		–		–		7	–	4	–	0
Navy		–		–		7	–	4	–	1
Cincinnati		–		–		6	–	5	–	0
Florida State		–		–		6	–	5	–	0
Holy Cross		–		–		6	–	5	–	0
Tulane		–		–		6	–	5	–	0
UNLV		–		–		6	–	6	–	0
South Carolina		–		–		6	–	6	–	0
Temple		–		–		5	–	5	–	0
Boston College		–		–		5	–	6	–	0
East Carolina		–		–		5	–	6	–	0
Northeast Louisiana		–		–		5	–	6	–	0
Louisville		–		–		5	–	6	–	0
Notre Dame		–		–		5	–	6	–	0
Rutgers		–		–		5	–	6	–	0
William & Mary		–		–		5	–	6	–	0
Syracuse		–		–		4	–	6	–	1
Richmond		–		–		4	–	7	–	0
Army		–		–		3	–	7	–	1
North Texas State		–		–		2	–	9	–	0
Georgia Tech		–		–		1	–	10	–	0
Memphis State		–		–		1	–	10	–	0
Rankings from AP Poll

The 1981 Rutgers Scarlet Knights football team represented Rutgers University as an independent during the 1981 NCAA Division I-A football season. In their ninth season under head coach Frank R. Burns, the Scarlet Knights compiled a 5–6 record while competing as an independent and were outscored by their opponents 208 to 139. The team's statistical leaders included Ralph Leek with 926 passing yards, Albert Ray with 679 rushing yards, and Andrew Baker with 356 receiving yards.

== Schedule ==
Date	Opponent	Site	Result	Attendance	Source
September 5	at Syracuse	Carrier Dome; Syracuse, NY	W 29–27	38,715	
September 12	Colgate	Rutgers Stadium; Piscataway, NJ	W 13–5	18,655	
September 18	vs. Virginia	Giants Stadium; East Rutherford, NJ	W 3–0	22,816	
September 26	at Cincinnati	Nippert Stadium; Cincinnati, OH	L 0–10	13,657	
October 3	Cornell	Rutgers Stadium; Piscataway, NJ	W 31–17	10,125	
October 10	at Army	Michie Stadium; West Point, NY	W 17–0	40,567	
October 17	Temple	Rutgers Stadium; Piscataway, NJ	L 12–24	22,189	
October 24	at No. 11 Alabama	Bryant–Denny Stadium; Tuscaloosa, AL	L 7–31	60,210	
November 7	No. 1 Pittsburgh	Giants Stadium; East Rutherford, NJ	L 3–47	34,636	
November 14	at West Virginia	Mountaineer Field; Morgantown, WV	L 3–20	44,395	
November 21	at Boston College	Alumni Stadium; Chestnut Hill, MA	L 21–27	16,500	
Rankings from Coaches' Poll released prior to the game

== Roster ==
1981 Rutgers Scarlet Knights football team roster
Players
Coaches
Offense

Pos.	#	Name	Class
RB	31	Joe Burke	Jr
C	61	Mike Flynn	Jr
WR	84	Jed Karpinski	Jr
QB		Jacque LaPrarie	Fr
QB	7	Ralph Leek	Jr
C	59	Frank Naylor	Sr

Defense

Pos.	#	Name	Class
CB	4	Carl Howard	Jr
DT	62	Bill Pickel	Jr

Special teams

Pos.	#	Name	Class

Head coach

- Frank R. Burns

Coordinators/assistant coaches

- George DeLeone
  (Defensive coordinator/linebackers coach)
- Greg Gigantino
  (Defensive line coach)

Legend

- (C) Team captain
- (S) Suspended
- (I) Ineligible
- Injured
- Redshirt
