= 1981 Princeton Tigers football team =

American college football season

1981 Princeton Tigers football
- Conference: Ivy League
- Record: 5–4–1 (5–1–1 Ivy)
- Head coach: Frank Navarro (4th season)
- Captains: Jonathon D. Helmerich; Lawrence D. Van Pelt
- Home stadium: Palmer Stadium

1981 Ivy League football standings
	Conf.					Overall
Team	W		L		T	W		L		T
Yale +	6	–	1	–	0	9	–	1	–	0
Dartmouth +	6	–	1	–	0	6	–	4	–	0
Princeton	5	–	1	–	1	5	–	4	–	1
Harvard	4	–	2	–	1	5	–	4	–	1
Brown	2	–	5	–	0	3	–	7	–	0
Cornell	2	–	5	–	0	3	–	7	–	0
Columbia	1	–	6	–	0	1	–	9	–	0
Penn	1	–	6	–	0	1	–	9	–	0
+ – Conference co-champions

The 1981 Princeton Tigers football team was an American football team that represented Princeton University during the 1981 NCAA Division I-A football season. Princeton finished third in the Ivy League.

In their fourth year under head coach Frank Navarro, the Tigers compiled a 5–4–1 record but were outscored 323 to 233. Jonathon D. Helmerich and Lawrence D. Van Pelt were the team captains.

Princeton's 5–1–1 conference record placed third in the Ivy League standings. The Tigers outscored Ivy opponents 181 to 155.

This would be Princeton's last season in the NCAA's top level of football competition. Shortly after the season ended, the NCAA reassigned all of the Ivy League teams to the second-tier Division I-AA, which would later be renamed the Football Championship Subdivision.

Princeton played its home games at Palmer Stadium on the university campus in Princeton, New Jersey.

== Schedule ==
Date	Opponent	Site	Result	Attendance	Source
September 19	at Dartmouth	Memorial Field; Hanover, NH	L 13–32	6,981	
September 26	at Delaware*	Delaware Stadium; Newark, DE	L 8–61	10,110	
October 3	at Brown	Brown Stadium; Providence, RI	W 20–17	5,800	
October 10	Columbia	Palmer Stadium; Princeton, NJ	W 21–14	12,360	
October 17	at Army*	Michie Stadium; West Point, NY	L 0–34	39,515	
October 24	at Harvard	Harvard Stadium; Boston, MA (rivalry)	T 17–17	17,500	
October 31	at Penn	Franklin Field; Philadelphia, PA (rivalry)	W 38–30	20,333	
November 7	Maine*	Palmer Stadium; Princeton, NJ	L 44–55	6,887	
November 14	Yale	Palmer Stadium; Princeton, NJ (rivalry)	W 35–31	20,303	
November 21	Cornell	Palmer Stadium; Princeton, NJ	W 37–14	9,009	
*Non-conference game

== Roster ==
1981 Princeton Tigers football team roster
Players			Coaches
Offense: Pos. / # / Name / Class; QB / 9 / Bob Holly / Sr	Defense: Pos. / # / Name / Class	Special teams: Pos. / # / Name / Class	Head coach: Frank Navarro; Coordinators/assistant coaches Legend: (C) Team captain; (S) Suspended; (I) Ineligible; Injured; Redshirt
