= 1981 Richmond Spiders football team =

American college football season

1981 Richmond Spiders football
- Conference: Independent
- Record: 4–7
- Head coach: Dal Shealy (2nd season)
- Offensive coordinator: Jim Marshall (3rd season)
- Home stadium: City Stadium

1981 NCAA Division I-A independents football records
	Conf.					Overall
Team	W		L		T	W		L		T
No. 4 Pittsburgh		–		–		11	–	1	–	0
No. 3 Penn State		–		–		10	–	2	–	0
No. 8 Miami (FL)		–		–		9	–	2	–	0
Southern Miss		–		–		9	–	2	–	1
No. 17 West Virginia		–		–		9	–	3	–	0
Colgate		–		–		7	–	3	–	0
Virginia Tech		–		–		7	–	4	–	0
Navy		–		–		7	–	4	–	1
Cincinnati		–		–		6	–	5	–	0
Florida State		–		–		6	–	5	–	0
Holy Cross		–		–		6	–	5	–	0
Tulane		–		–		6	–	5	–	0
UNLV		–		–		6	–	6	–	0
South Carolina		–		–		6	–	6	–	0
Temple		–		–		5	–	5	–	0
Boston College		–		–		5	–	6	–	0
East Carolina		–		–		5	–	6	–	0
Northeast Louisiana		–		–		5	–	6	–	0
Louisville		–		–		5	–	6	–	0
Notre Dame		–		–		5	–	6	–	0
Rutgers		–		–		5	–	6	–	0
William & Mary		–		–		5	–	6	–	0
Syracuse		–		–		4	–	6	–	1
Richmond		–		–		4	–	7	–	0
Army		–		–		3	–	7	–	1
North Texas State		–		–		2	–	9	–	0
Georgia Tech		–		–		1	–	10	–	0
Memphis State		–		–		1	–	10	–	0
Rankings from AP Poll

The 1981 Richmond Spiders football team represented Richmond College during the 1981 NCAA Division I-A football season. The Spiders were led by second-year head coach Dal Shealy and played their home games at City Stadium. The Spiders finished with a 4–7 record.

== Schedule ==
Date	Opponent	Site	Result	Attendance	Source
September 5	at NC State	Carter–Finley Stadium; Ralegigh, NC	L 21–27	40,400	
September 12	at Virginia Tech	Lane Stadium; Blacksburg, VA	L 12–28	30,200	
September 19	at Arkansas State	Indian Stadium; Jonesboro, AR	W 24–20	12,864	
September 26	Southern Miss	City Stadium; Richmond, VA	L 10–17	12,500	
October 3	James Madison	City Stadium; Richmond, VA	W 24–7	13,200	
October 10	East Carolina	City Stadium; Richmond, VA (Tobacco Bowl)	L 13–17	12,621	
October 17	at Cincinnati	Nippert Stadium; Cincinnati, OH	L 18–27		
November 7	at VMI	Alumni Memorial Field; Lexington, VA (rivalry)	W 45–14	7,800	
November 14	Wake Forest	City Stadium; Richmond, VA	L 22–34	15,285	
November 21	at William & Mary	Cary Field; Williamsburg, VA (rivalry)	L 21–35	10,800	
November 26	Penn	City Stadium; Richmond, VA	W 18–12	7,514	
