= 1981 West Virginia Mountaineers football team =

American college football season

1981 West Virginia Mountaineers football

Peach Bowl champion

Peach Bowl, W 26–6 vs. Florida
- Conference: Independent

Ranking
- Coaches: No. 18
- AP: No. 17
- Record: 9–3
- Head coach: Don Nehlen (2nd season)
- Offensive coordinator: Gary Tranquill (2nd season)
- Defensive coordinator: Dennis Brown (2nd season)
- Home stadium: Mountaineer Field

1981 Major eastern college football independents records
	Conf.					Overall
Team	W		L		T	W		L		T
No. 3 Penn State $	5	–	0	–	0	10	–	2	–	0
No. 4 Pittsburgh	5	–	1	–	0	11	–	1	–	0
No. 17 West Virginia	3	–	3	–	0	9	–	3	–	0
Temple	2	–	3	–	0	5	–	5	–	0
Syracuse	2	–	4	–	0	4	–	6	–	1
Boston College	1	–	4	–	0	5	–	6	–	0
Rutgers	1	–	4	–	0	5	–	6	–	0
$ – Lambert Trophy Winner; Rankings from AP Poll

1981 NCAA Division I-A independents football records
	Conf.					Overall
Team	W		L		T	W		L		T
No. 4 Pittsburgh		–		–		11	–	1	–	0
No. 3 Penn State		–		–		10	–	2	–	0
No. 8 Miami (FL)		–		–		9	–	2	–	0
Southern Miss		–		–		9	–	2	–	1
No. 17 West Virginia		–		–		9	–	3	–	0
Colgate		–		–		7	–	3	–	0
Virginia Tech		–		–		7	–	4	–	0
Navy		–		–		7	–	4	–	1
Cincinnati		–		–		6	–	5	–	0
Florida State		–		–		6	–	5	–	0
Holy Cross		–		–		6	–	5	–	0
Tulane		–		–		6	–	5	–	0
UNLV		–		–		6	–	6	–	0
South Carolina		–		–		6	–	6	–	0
Temple		–		–		5	–	5	–	0
Boston College		–		–		5	–	6	–	0
East Carolina		–		–		5	–	6	–	0
Northeast Louisiana		–		–		5	–	6	–	0
Louisville		–		–		5	–	6	–	0
Notre Dame		–		–		5	–	6	–	0
Rutgers		–		–		5	–	6	–	0
William & Mary		–		–		5	–	6	–	0
Syracuse		–		–		4	–	6	–	1
Richmond		–		–		4	–	7	–	0
Army		–		–		3	–	7	–	1
North Texas State		–		–		2	–	9	–	0
Georgia Tech		–		–		1	–	10	–	0
Memphis State		–		–		1	–	10	–	0
Rankings from AP Poll

The 1981 West Virginia Mountaineers football team represented West Virginia University as an independent during the 1981 NCAA Division I-A football season. It was the Mountaineers' 89th overall season. The team was led by head coach Don Nehlen, in his second year, and played their home games at Mountaineer Field in Morgantown, West Virginia. They finished the season with record of 9–3 and defeated Florida in the Peach Bowl.

== Schedule ==
Date	Opponent	Site	TV	Result	Attendance	Source
September 12	at Virginia	Scott Stadium; Charlottesville, VA		W 32–18	34,007	
September 19	at Maryland	Byrd Stadium; College Park, MD (rivalry)		W 17–13	38,300	
September 26	Colorado State	Mountaineer Field; Morgantown, WV		W 49–3	48,716	
October 3	at Boston College	Alumni Stadium; Chestnut Hill, MA		W 38–10	17,235	
October 10	No. 4 Pittsburgh	Mountaineer Field; Morgantown, WV (rivalry)		L 0–17	54,280	
October 17	Virginia Tech	Mountaineer Field; Morgantown, WV (rivalry)		W 27–6	49,115	
October 24	at No. 1 Penn State	Beaver Stadium; University Park, PA (rivalry)		L 7–30	85,012	
October 31	East Carolina	Mountaineer Field; Morgantown, WV		W 20–3	41,364	
November 7	Temple	Mountaineer Field; Morgantown, WV		W 24–19	40,342	
November 14	Rutgers	Mountaineer Field; Morgantown, WV		W 20–3	44,395	
November 21	at Syracuse	Carrier Dome; Syracuse, NY (rivalry)	ABC	L 24–27	33,117	
December 31	vs. Florida	Atlanta–Fulton County Stadium; Atlanta, GA (Peach Bowl)	CBS	W 26–6	37,582	
Rankings from AP Poll released prior to the game

== Roster ==
1981 West Virginia Mountaineers football team roster
Players
Coaches
Offense

Pos.	#	Name	Class
WR	1	Gary Mullen	Fr
QB	7	Curt Cignetti	Jr
QB	10	Oliver Luck	Sr
RB	20	Curlin Beck	Jr
FB	36	Ron Wolfley	Fr
RB	42	Mickey Walczak	Jr
WR	48	Willie Drewrey	Fr
G	79	Mike Durrette	Sr

Defense

Pos.	#	Name	Class
LB	41	Jeff Deem	Jr
LB	50	Dennis Fowlkes	Jr
LB	90	Darryl Talley	Jr

Special teams

Pos.	#	Name	Class
K	3	Paul Woodside	Fr
K		Murat Turcan	Sr

Head coach

- Don Nehlen

Coordinators/assistant coaches

- Gary Tranquill – Offensive coordinator
- Dennis Brown – Defensive coordinator

Legend

- (C) Team captain
- (S) Suspended
- (I) Ineligible
- Injured
- Redshirt
