= 1981 Georgia Tech Yellow Jackets football team =

American college football season

1981 Georgia Tech Yellow Jackets football
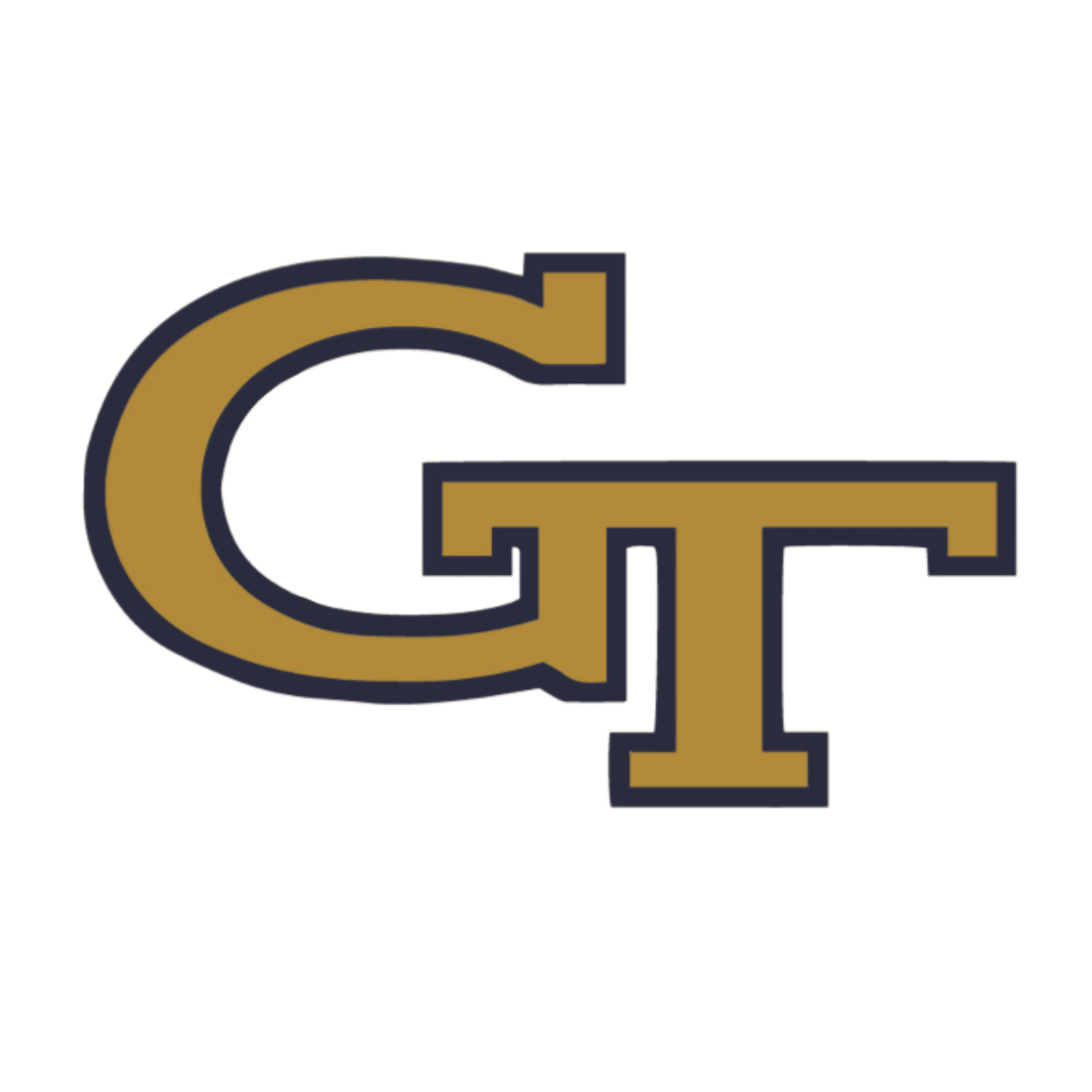
- Conference: Independent
- Record: 1–10
- Head coach: Bill Curry (2nd season)
- Offensive coordinator: Rip Scherer (1st season)
- Defensive coordinator: Ken Blair (2nd season)
- Captains: Dave Lutz; Lance Skelton; Mark Bradley; Ken Carney
- Home stadium: Grant Field

1981 NCAA Division I-A independents football records
	Conf.					Overall
Team	W		L		T	W		L		T
No. 4 Pittsburgh		–		–		11	–	1	–	0
No. 3 Penn State		–		–		10	–	2	–	0
No. 8 Miami (FL)		–		–		9	–	2	–	0
Southern Miss		–		–		9	–	2	–	1
No. 17 West Virginia		–		–		9	–	3	–	0
Colgate		–		–		7	–	3	–	0
Virginia Tech		–		–		7	–	4	–	0
Navy		–		–		7	–	4	–	1
Cincinnati		–		–		6	–	5	–	0
Florida State		–		–		6	–	5	–	0
Holy Cross		–		–		6	–	5	–	0
Tulane		–		–		6	–	5	–	0
UNLV		–		–		6	–	6	–	0
South Carolina		–		–		6	–	6	–	0
Temple		–		–		5	–	5	–	0
Boston College		–		–		5	–	6	–	0
East Carolina		–		–		5	–	6	–	0
Northeast Louisiana		–		–		5	–	6	–	0
Louisville		–		–		5	–	6	–	0
Notre Dame		–		–		5	–	6	–	0
Rutgers		–		–		5	–	6	–	0
William & Mary		–		–		5	–	6	–	0
Syracuse		–		–		4	–	6	–	1
Richmond		–		–		4	–	7	–	0
Army		–		–		3	–	7	–	1
North Texas State		–		–		2	–	9	–	0
Georgia Tech		–		–		1	–	10	–	0
Memphis State		–		–		1	–	10	–	0
Rankings from AP Poll

The 1981 Georgia Tech Yellow Jackets football team represented the Georgia Institute of Technology during the 1981 NCAA Division I-A football season. The Yellow Jackets were led by second-year head coach Bill Curry, and played their home games at Grant Field in Atlanta. Georgia Tech produced abysmal results for the second consecutive year under Curry, finishing with a record of 1–10, their worst season in terms of winning percentage in school history (it would later be matched by another 1–10 season in 1994). Their sole win was a season-opening upset victory over the second-ranked Alabama Crimson Tide in Birmingham.

== Schedule ==
Date	Opponent	Site	TV	Result	Attendance	Source
September 12	at No. 2 Alabama	Legion Field; Birmingham, AL (rivalry)	ESPN	W 24–21	78,865	
September 19	at Florida	Florida Field; Gainesville, FL		L 6–27	63,876	
September 26	Memphis State	Grant Field; Atlanta, GA		L 15–28	32,463	
October 3	No. 6 North Carolina	Grant Field; Atlanta, GA		L 7–28	39,263	
October 10	at Tennessee	Neyland Stadium; Knoxville, TN (rivalry)		L 7–10	94,478	
October 17	Auburn	Grant Field; Atlanta, GA (rivalry)		L 7–31	50,263–50,326	
October 24	at Tulane	Louisiana Superdome; New Orleans, LA		L 10–27	37,431	
October 31	Duke^{†}	Grant Field; Atlanta, GA		L 24–38	30,232	
November 7	at Notre Dame	Notre Dame Stadium; Notre Dame, IN (rivalry)		L 3–35	59,075	
November 14	Navy	Grant Field; Atlanta, GA		L 14–20	20,129	
December 5	No. 2 Georgia	Grant Field; Atlanta, GA (Clean, Old-Fashioned Hate)	ABC	L 7–44	58,623	
^{†}Homecoming; Rankings from AP Poll released prior to the game

== Roster ==
1981 Georgia Tech Yellow Jackets football team roster
Players
Coaches
Offense

Pos.	#	Name	Class
QB	2	Mike Kelley	Sr
QB	12	Jim Bob Taylor	Jr
RB		Robert Lavette
RB		Ronny Cone
WR		Kenny Thompson
WR		Jeff Keisler
TE	9	Ken Whisenhunt	So
G	64	Ben Utt	Sr
OT	78	Dave Lutz	Jr
OL		Ellis Gardner
OL		Ken Howell
OL		Mark Schultz
OL		Dean Waters

Defense

Pos.	#	Name	Class
DL		Mark Bradley
DL		Donnie Chisholm
DL		Marvin Dyett
LB	56	Robert Jaracz
LB		Rob Horton
LB		Lance Skelton
LB		Duane Wood
CB	22	Jack Westbrook	So
DB		Sammy Brown
DB		Paul Menegazzi
DB		Mark Sheffield
DB		Ted Thurson

Special teams

Pos.	#	Name	Class

Head coach

- Bill Curry

Coordinators/assistant coaches

- Rip Scherer – Offensive coordinator
- Jeff McLean – Running backs
- Terry Tuley – Wide receivers
- Brad Roper – Tight ends
- Mac McWhorter – Offensive line
- Mark Hunter – Offensive line
- Ken Blair – Defensive coordinator
- John Guy – Defensive line
- Barry Wilson – Inside linebackers
- Mike Dean – Defensive backs

Legend

- (C) Team captain
- (S) Suspended
- (I) Ineligible
- Injured
- Redshirt
