= 1981 William & Mary Tribe football team =

American college football season

1981 William & Mary Tribe football
- Conference: Independent
- Record: 5–6
- Head coach: Jimmye Laycock (2nd season)
- Captains: Owen Costello; Chris Garrity
- Home stadium: Cary Field

1981 NCAA Division I-A independents football records
	Conf.					Overall
Team	W		L		T	W		L		T
No. 4 Pittsburgh		–		–		11	–	1	–	0
No. 3 Penn State		–		–		10	–	2	–	0
No. 8 Miami (FL)		–		–		9	–	2	–	0
Southern Miss		–		–		9	–	2	–	1
No. 17 West Virginia		–		–		9	–	3	–	0
Colgate		–		–		7	–	3	–	0
Virginia Tech		–		–		7	–	4	–	0
Navy		–		–		7	–	4	–	1
Cincinnati		–		–		6	–	5	–	0
Florida State		–		–		6	–	5	–	0
Holy Cross		–		–		6	–	5	–	0
Tulane		–		–		6	–	5	–	0
UNLV		–		–		6	–	6	–	0
South Carolina		–		–		6	–	6	–	0
Temple		–		–		5	–	5	–	0
Boston College		–		–		5	–	6	–	0
East Carolina		–		–		5	–	6	–	0
Northeast Louisiana		–		–		5	–	6	–	0
Louisville		–		–		5	–	6	–	0
Notre Dame		–		–		5	–	6	–	0
Rutgers		–		–		5	–	6	–	0
William & Mary		–		–		5	–	6	–	0
Syracuse		–		–		4	–	6	–	1
Richmond		–		–		4	–	7	–	0
Army		–		–		3	–	7	–	1
North Texas State		–		–		2	–	9	–	0
Georgia Tech		–		–		1	–	10	–	0
Memphis State		–		–		1	–	10	–	0
Rankings from AP Poll

The 1981 William & Mary Tribe football team represented the College of William & Mary as an independent during the 1981 NCAA Division I-A football season. Led by Jimmye Laycock in his second year as head coach, William & Mary finished the season with a record of 5–6.

== Schedule ==
Date	Opponent	Site	Result	Attendance	Source
September 5	at Temple	Franklin Field; Philadelphia, PA	L 0–42	10,985	
September 12	Miami (OH)	Cary Field; Williamsburg, VA	L 14–33	12,800	
September 19	at Virginia Tech	Lane Stadium; Blacksburg, VA	L 3–47	30,600	
October 3	at VMI	Alumni Memorial Field; Lexington, VA (rivalry)	L 14–31	8,250	
October 10	at Dartmouth	Memorial Field; Hanover, NH	W 12–7	10,061	
October 17	Marshall	Cary Field; Williamsburg, VA	W 38–7	8,000	
October 24	at Navy	Navy–Marine Corps Memorial Stadium; Annapolis, MD	L 0–27	25,014	
October 31	James Madison	Cary Field; Williamsburg, VA (rivalry)	W 31–19	7,800	
November 7	Harvard	Cary Field; Williamsburg, VA	L 14–23	16,000	
November 14	at East Carolina	Ficklen Stadium; Greenville, NC	W 31–21	15,842	
November 21	Richmond	Cary Field; Williamsburg, VA (I-64 Bowl)	W 35–21	10,800	

== Roster ==
1981 William & Mary Tribe football team roster
Players
Coaches
Offense

Pos.	#	Name	Class
QB	12	Chris Garrity	Sr
QB	15	Dave Murphy	So
QB	7	Stan Yagiello	Fr
WR	40	Jeff Wolf	Jr

Defense

Pos.	#	Name	Class
DT	78	John Cannon	Sr
FS	23	Mark Kelso	Fr
DE	55	Dan Ness	Jr

Special teams

Pos.	#	Name	Class

Head coach

- Jimmye Laycock

Coordinators/assistant coaches

Legend

- (C) Team captain
- (S) Suspended
- (I) Ineligible
- Injured
- Redshirt
