= 1981 Louisville Cardinals football team =

American college football season

1981 Louisville Cardinals football
- Conference: Independent
- Record: 5–6
- Head coach: Bob Weber (2nd season)
- Home stadium: Fairgrounds Stadium

1981 NCAA Division I-A independents football records
	Conf.					Overall
Team	W		L		T	W		L		T
No. 4 Pittsburgh		–		–		11	–	1	–	0
No. 3 Penn State		–		–		10	–	2	–	0
No. 8 Miami (FL)		–		–		9	–	2	–	0
Southern Miss		–		–		9	–	2	–	1
No. 17 West Virginia		–		–		9	–	3	–	0
Colgate		–		–		7	–	3	–	0
Virginia Tech		–		–		7	–	4	–	0
Navy		–		–		7	–	4	–	1
Cincinnati		–		–		6	–	5	–	0
Florida State		–		–		6	–	5	–	0
Holy Cross		–		–		6	–	5	–	0
Tulane		–		–		6	–	5	–	0
UNLV		–		–		6	–	6	–	0
South Carolina		–		–		6	–	6	–	0
Temple		–		–		5	–	5	–	0
Boston College		–		–		5	–	6	–	0
East Carolina		–		–		5	–	6	–	0
Northeast Louisiana		–		–		5	–	6	–	0
Louisville		–		–		5	–	6	–	0
Notre Dame		–		–		5	–	6	–	0
Rutgers		–		–		5	–	6	–	0
William & Mary		–		–		5	–	6	–	0
Syracuse		–		–		4	–	6	–	1
Richmond		–		–		4	–	7	–	0
Army		–		–		3	–	7	–	1
North Texas State		–		–		2	–	9	–	0
Georgia Tech		–		–		1	–	10	–	0
Memphis State		–		–		1	–	10	–	0
Rankings from AP Poll

The 1981 Louisville Cardinals football team was an American football team that represented the University of Louisville as an independent during the 1981 NCAA Division I-A football season. In their second season under head coach Bob Weber, the Cardinals compiled a 5–6 record and were outscored by a total of 212 to 180.

The team's statistical leaders included Dean May with 589 passing yards, Don Craft with 475 rushing yards, Mark Clayton with 596 receiving yards, and Don Craft and Tony Blair with 42 points each.

== Schedule ==
Date	Opponent	Site	Result	Attendance	Source
September 5	at No. 19 Florida State	Doak Campbell Stadium; Tallahassee, FL	L 0–17	50,735	
September 12	Toledo	Fairgrounds Stadium; Louisville, KY	W 31–6	21,226	
September 19	Long Beach State	Fairgrounds Stadium; Louisville, KY	W 35–13	23,424	
September 26	at Missouri	Faurot Field; Columbia, MO	L 3–34	57,448	
October 3	Marshall	Fairgrounds Stadium; Louisville, KY	W 36–0		
October 10	at Memphis State	Liberty Bowl Memorial Stadium; Memphis, TN (rivalry)	W 14–7	24,286	
October 17	Tennessee State	Fairgrounds Stadium; Louisville, KY	L 30–42	28,136	
October 24	at Oklahoma State	Lewis Field; Stillwater, OK	L 11–19	44,000	
November 7	Northeast Louisiana	Fairgrounds Stadium; Louisville, KY	L 7–40	15,994	
November 14	at Cincinnati	Nippert Stadium; Cincinnati, OH (The Keg of Nails)	L 0–24	15,617	
November 21	No. 9 Southern Miss	Fairgrounds Stadium; Louisville, KY	W 13–10	12,940	
Rankings from AP Poll released prior to the game

== Roster ==
1981 Louisville Cardinals football team roster
Players
Coaches
Offense

Pos.	#	Name	Class
QB	5	Dean May	So
WR	20	Mark Clayton	Jr
FB	31	Ron Davenport	Fr
OT	76	Tom Andrews	So

Defense

Pos.	#	Name	Class
CB	1	Frank Minnifield	Jr
LB	2	Greg Jones	Jr
CB	34	Roger Clay	Jr
LB	39	Anthony Williams	Jr
DT	77	Pete McCartney	So
DT	97	Dan Williams	Jr
LB	99	Fred Blackmon	Jr

Special teams

Pos.	#	Name	Class

Head coach

- Bob Weber

Coordinators/assistant coaches

Legend

- (C) Team captain
- (S) Suspended
- (I) Ineligible
- Injured
- Redshirt
