= 1981 Northeast Louisiana Indians football team =

American college football season

1981 Northeast Louisiana Indians football
- Conference: Independent
- Record: 5–6
- Head coach: Pat Collins (1st season)
- Home stadium: Malone Stadium

1981 NCAA Division I-A independents football records
	Conf.					Overall
Team	W		L		T	W		L		T
No. 4 Pittsburgh		–		–		11	–	1	–	0
No. 3 Penn State		–		–		10	–	2	–	0
No. 8 Miami (FL)		–		–		9	–	2	–	0
Southern Miss		–		–		9	–	2	–	1
No. 17 West Virginia		–		–		9	–	3	–	0
Colgate		–		–		7	–	3	–	0
Virginia Tech		–		–		7	–	4	–	0
Navy		–		–		7	–	4	–	1
Cincinnati		–		–		6	–	5	–	0
Florida State		–		–		6	–	5	–	0
Holy Cross		–		–		6	–	5	–	0
Tulane		–		–		6	–	5	–	0
UNLV		–		–		6	–	6	–	0
South Carolina		–		–		6	–	6	–	0
Temple		–		–		5	–	5	–	0
Boston College		–		–		5	–	6	–	0
East Carolina		–		–		5	–	6	–	0
Northeast Louisiana		–		–		5	–	6	–	0
Louisville		–		–		5	–	6	–	0
Notre Dame		–		–		5	–	6	–	0
Rutgers		–		–		5	–	6	–	0
William & Mary		–		–		5	–	6	–	0
Syracuse		–		–		4	–	6	–	1
Richmond		–		–		4	–	7	–	0
Army		–		–		3	–	7	–	1
North Texas State		–		–		2	–	9	–	0
Georgia Tech		–		–		1	–	10	–	0
Memphis State		–		–		1	–	10	–	0
Rankings from AP Poll

The 1981 Northeast Louisiana Indians football team was an American football team that represented Northeast Louisiana University (now known as the University of Louisiana at Monroe) as an independent during the 1981 NCAA Division I-A football season. In their first year under head coach Pat Collins, the team compiled a 5–6 record.

== Schedule ==
Date	Opponent	Site	Result	Attendance	Source
September 5	Indiana State	Malone Stadium; Monroe, LA	W 38–8		
September 12	Arkansas State	Malone Stadium; Monroe, LA	L 13–35		
September 19	Southwestern Louisiana	Malone Stadium; Monroe, LA	W 20–17	12,555	
October 3	at Louisiana Tech	Joe Aillet Stadium; Ruston, LA (rivalry)	W 35–0	23,500	
October 10	Lamar	Malone Stadium; Monroe, LA	L 13–17		
October 17	at McNeese State	Cowboy Stadium; Lake Charles, LA	L 25–41		
October 24	at Southeastern Louisiana	Strawberry Stadium; Hammond, LA	L 47–50		
October 31	Nicholls State	Malone Stadium; Monroe, LA	W 55–18	16,988	
November 7	at Louisville	Fairgrounds Stadium; Louisville, KY	W 40–7	15,994	
November 14	North Texas State	Malone Stadium; Monroe, LA	L 14–17	15,800	
November 21	at Northwestern State	Harry Turpin Stadium; Natchitoches, LA (rivalry)	L 9–41	6,250	
