= 1981 Dartmouth Big Green football team =

American college football season

1981 Dartmouth Big Green football

Ivy League co-champion
- Conference: Ivy League
- Record: 6–4 (6–1 Ivy)
- Head coach: Joe Yukica (4th season)
- Captains: Kent Cooper; George Thompson
- Home stadium: Memorial Field

1981 Ivy League football standings
	Conf.					Overall
Team	W		L		T	W		L		T
Yale +	6	–	1	–	0	9	–	1	–	0
Dartmouth +	6	–	1	–	0	6	–	4	–	0
Princeton	5	–	1	–	1	5	–	4	–	1
Harvard	4	–	2	–	1	5	–	4	–	1
Brown	2	–	5	–	0	3	–	7	–	0
Cornell	2	–	5	–	0	3	–	7	–	0
Columbia	1	–	6	–	0	1	–	9	–	0
Penn	1	–	6	–	0	1	–	9	–	0
+ – Conference co-champions

The 1981 Dartmouth Big Green football team was an American football team that represented Dartmouth College during the 1981 NCAA Division I-A football season.

In their fourth season under head coach Joe Yukica, the Big Green compiled a 6–4 record and outscored opponents 208 to 137. Kent Cooper and George Thompson were the team captains.

The Big Green's 6–1 conference record tied Yale for the Ivy League championship. Dartmouth outscored Ivy opponents 193 to 87. Dartmouth's sole league loss was to its co-champion, Yale.

This was the Big Green's last season in the NCAA's top level of football competition. Shortly after the season ended, the NCAA reassigned all of the Ivy League teams to the second-tier Division I-AA, which would later be renamed the Football Championship Subdivision.

Dartmouth played its home games at Memorial Field on the college campus in Hanover, New Hampshire.

== Schedule ==
Date	Opponent	Site	Result	Attendance	Source
September 19	Princeton	Memorial Field; Hanover, NH	W 32–13	6,981	
September 26	at UMass*	Alumni Stadium; Hadley, MA	L 8–10	11,855	
October 3	Holy Cross*	Memorial Field; Hanover, NH	L 0–28	7,203	
October 10	William & Mary*	Memorial Field; Hanover, NH	L 7–12	10,061	
October 17	at Harvard	Harvard Stadium; Boston, MA (rivalry)	W 24–10	25,000	
October 24	Cornell	Memorial Field; Hanover, NH (rivalry)	W 42–7	12,054	
October 31	at Yale	Yale Bowl; New Haven, CT	L 3–24	32,500	
November 7	at Columbia	Baker Field; New York, NY	W 21–7	3,860	
November 14	Brown	Memorial Field; Hanover, NH	W 38–13	9,500	
November 21	at Penn	Franklin Field; Philadelphia, PA	W 33–13	9,757	
*Non-conference game
