= 1981 Army Cadets football team =

American college football season

1981 Army Cadets football
- Conference: Independent
- Record: 3–7–1
- Head coach: Ed Cavanaugh (2nd season)
- Captain: Stan March
- Home stadium: Michie Stadium

1981 NCAA Division I-A independents football records
	Conf.					Overall
Team	W		L		T	W		L		T
No. 4 Pittsburgh		–		–		11	–	1	–	0
No. 3 Penn State		–		–		10	–	2	–	0
No. 8 Miami (FL)		–		–		9	–	2	–	0
Southern Miss		–		–		9	–	2	–	1
No. 17 West Virginia		–		–		9	–	3	–	0
Colgate		–		–		7	–	3	–	0
Virginia Tech		–		–		7	–	4	–	0
Navy		–		–		7	–	4	–	1
Cincinnati		–		–		6	–	5	–	0
Florida State		–		–		6	–	5	–	0
Holy Cross		–		–		6	–	5	–	0
Tulane		–		–		6	–	5	–	0
UNLV		–		–		6	–	6	–	0
South Carolina		–		–		6	–	6	–	0
Temple		–		–		5	–	5	–	0
Boston College		–		–		5	–	6	–	0
East Carolina		–		–		5	–	6	–	0
Northeast Louisiana		–		–		5	–	6	–	0
Louisville		–		–		5	–	6	–	0
Notre Dame		–		–		5	–	6	–	0
Rutgers		–		–		5	–	6	–	0
William & Mary		–		–		5	–	6	–	0
Syracuse		–		–		4	–	6	–	1
Richmond		–		–		4	–	7	–	0
Army		–		–		3	–	7	–	1
North Texas State		–		–		2	–	9	–	0
Georgia Tech		–		–		1	–	10	–	0
Memphis State		–		–		1	–	10	–	0
Rankings from AP Poll

The 1981 Army Cadets football team was an American football team that represented the United States Military Academy as an independent during the 1981 NCAA Division I-A football season. In their second season under head coach Ed Cavanaugh, the Cadets compiled a 3–7–1 record and were outscored by their opponents by a combined total of 212 to 126. In the annual Army–Navy Game, the Cadets played the Midshipmen to a 3–3 tie.

== Schedule ==
Date	Time	Opponent	Site	TV	Result	Attendance	Source
September 12		at Missouri	Faurot Field; Columbia, MO		L 10–24	60,033	
September 19		VMI	Michie Stadium; West Point, NY		L 7–14	29,970	
September 26		Brown	Michie Stadium; West Point, NY		W 23–17	31,859	
October 3		at Harvard	Harvard Stadium; Boston, MA		W 27–13	16,000	
October 10		Rutgers	Michie Stadium; West Point, NY		L 0–17	40,567	
October 17		Princeton	Michie Stadium; West Point, NY		W 34–0	39,515	
October 24		Boston College	Michie Stadium; West Point, NY		L 6–41	39,357	
October 31		at Air Force	Falcon Stadium; Colorado Springs, CO (Commander-in-Chief's Trophy)		L 3–7	31,535	
November 7		Holy Cross	Michie Stadium; West Point, NY		L 13–28	33,642	
November 14	1:30 p.m.	at No. 1 Pittsburgh	Pitt Stadium; Pittsburgh, PA		L 0–48	53,225	
December 5	3:50 p.m.	vs. Navy	Veterans Stadium; Philadelphia, PA (Army–Navy Game)	ABC	T 3–3	60,470	
Rankings from AP Poll released prior to the game; All times are in Eastern time

== Roster ==
1981 Army Cadets football team roster
Players
Coaches
Offense

Pos.	#	Name	Class
RB		Elton Akins
QB	17	Bryan Allem	So
QB	19	Jerryl Bennett	Sr
RB		Andre Cuerington	So
C	52	Dan Enright	Sr
OT	74	Shamus Hanlon	So
WR	45	Dino Harris	Sr
TE	39	Rob Heather	Sr
WR		Jarvis Hollingsworth
TE	30	Joe Homa	Jr
G	60	Dave Kinsella	Sr
WR	38	Kevin Kullander	Sr
RB	36	Don Martin	So
WR	82	Larry Pruitt	Jr
WR		Brad Risser
QB		Nate Sassaman
OT	73	Jim Sharman	Sr
RB		Rusty Stewart
TE		Mark Triplett
G	79	Rick Waddell	Sr
RB	33	Warren Waldorff	Jr
RB	40	Gerald Walker	Jr
RB	31	Todd Williams	So
WR	80	Al Wynder	Sr
RB		Jim Utley
RB	32	Art Zarone	So

Defense

Pos.	#	Name	Class
DB	28	Herb Aten	So
DB		Gary Bastin
DB		Dee Bryant
DL	89	Larry Carroll	So
DB	22	Rick Dauch	Jr
DL	69	Kevin Dodson	Sr
DT	70	Mike Hogan	Sr
LB	53	John Garrison	Sr
LB		Jim Gentile
DB	26	Joe Hampton	Jr
LB	51	Dan Kessler	Jr
DB	19	Dale Love	Sr
DB	24	Kevin Murphy	Jr
LB		John Roney
LB	57	Pat Scanlon	So
DE	59	Charles Swanson	Sr
DE	43	Pat Sweeney	Sr
DB	18	Mike Williams	Jr
DE	86	Bob Wood	Jr

Special teams

Pos.	#	Name	Class
K	95	Dave Aucoin	Sr
P	97	Joe Sartiano	So

Head coach

- Ed Cavanaugh

Coordinators/assistant coaches

Legend

- (C) Team captain
- (S) Suspended
- (I) Ineligible
- Injured
- Redshirt
