= 1981 South Carolina Gamecocks football team =

American college football season

1981 South Carolina Gamecocks football
- Conference: Independent
- Record: 6–6
- Head coach: Jim Carlen (7th season)
- Defensive coordinator: Richard Bell (7th season)
- Home stadium: Williams–Brice Stadium

1981 NCAA Division I-A independents football records
	Conf.					Overall
Team	W		L		T	W		L		T
No. 4 Pittsburgh		–		–		11	–	1	–	0
No. 3 Penn State		–		–		10	–	2	–	0
No. 8 Miami (FL)		–		–		9	–	2	–	0
Southern Miss		–		–		9	–	2	–	1
No. 17 West Virginia		–		–		9	–	3	–	0
Colgate		–		–		7	–	3	–	0
Virginia Tech		–		–		7	–	4	–	0
Navy		–		–		7	–	4	–	1
Cincinnati		–		–		6	–	5	–	0
Florida State		–		–		6	–	5	–	0
Holy Cross		–		–		6	–	5	–	0
Tulane		–		–		6	–	5	–	0
UNLV		–		–		6	–	6	–	0
South Carolina		–		–		6	–	6	–	0
Temple		–		–		5	–	5	–	0
Boston College		–		–		5	–	6	–	0
East Carolina		–		–		5	–	6	–	0
Northeast Louisiana		–		–		5	–	6	–	0
Louisville		–		–		5	–	6	–	0
Notre Dame		–		–		5	–	6	–	0
Rutgers		–		–		5	–	6	–	0
William & Mary		–		–		5	–	6	–	0
Syracuse		–		–		4	–	6	–	1
Richmond		–		–		4	–	7	–	0
Army		–		–		3	–	7	–	1
North Texas State		–		–		2	–	9	–	0
Georgia Tech		–		–		1	–	10	–	0
Memphis State		–		–		1	–	10	–	0
Rankings from AP Poll

The 1981 South Carolina Gamecocks football team represented the University of South Carolina as an independent during the 1981 NCAA Division I-A football season. Led by Jim Carlen in his seventh and final season as head coach, the Gamecocks compiled a record of 6–6.

In 1981, South Carolina started 6–3, highlighted by an upset over No. 3 North Carolina on the road, the first win over a top-5 team in program history. It would remain the biggest win in program history until 2010. However, the Gamecocks lost the last three games of the season, which left Carlen's job security in jeopardy, as Carlen and school president James B. Holderman were already constantly at odds over football revenues. Despite Carlen overseeing one of the most successful periods in program history until then (a 45–36–1 record, three of the school's five bowl games, two of the school's three eight-win seasons, and a Heisman Trophy), he was fired.

== Schedule ==
Date	Opponent	Site	TV	Result	Attendance	Source
September 5	at Wake Forest	Groves Stadium; Winston-Salem, NC		W 23–6	29,300	
September 12	Ole Miss	Williams–Brice Stadium; Columbia, SC		L 13–20	56,424	
September 19	Duke	Williams–Brice Stadium; Columbia, SC		W 17–3	56,321	
September 26	at No. 17 Georgia	Sanford Stadium; Athens, GA (rivalry)		L 0–24	82,100	
October 3	No. 4 Pittsburgh	Williams–Brice Stadium; Columbia, SC	ABC	L 28–42	56,495	
October 10	at Kentucky	Commonwealth Stadium; Lexington, KY		W 28–14	57,553	
October 17	Virginia	Williams–Brice Stadium; Columbia, SC		W 21–3	56,101	
October 24	at No. 3 North Carolina	Kenan Memorial Stadium; Chapel Hill, NC (rivalry)		W 31–13	50,500	
October 31	NC State	Williams–Brice Stadium; Columbia, SC	ABC	W 20–12	56,517	
November 7	Pacific (CA)	Williams–Brice Stadium; Columbia, SC		L 21–23	51,679	
November 21	No. 2 Clemson	Williams–Brice Stadium; Columbia, SC (rivalry)	ESPN	L 13–29	56,971	
December 5	at Hawaii	Aloha Stadium; Halawa, HI		L 10–33	43,958	
Rankings from Coaches' Poll released prior to the game

== Roster ==
1981 South Carolina Gamecocks football team roster
Players
Coaches
Offense

Pos.	#	Name	Class
G	67	Jeff Doyle	Sr
OT	76	Chuck Slaughter	Sr
RB	36	Johnnie Wright	Sr

Defense

Pos.	#	Name	Class
DT	70	Andrew Provence	Jr
DT	52	Emanuel Weaver	Sr

Special teams

Pos.	#	Name	Class
P	13	Chris Norman	So

Head coach

- Jim Carlen

Coordinators/assistant coaches

Legend

- (C) Team captain
- (S) Suspended
- (I) Ineligible
- Injured
- Redshirt
