= 1981 Columbia Lions football team =

American college football season

1981 Columbia Lions football
- Conference: Ivy League
- Record: 1–9 (1–6 Ivy)
- Head coach: Bob Naso (2nd season)
- Captains: Tom McNally; Vince Pellini
- Home stadium: Baker Field

1981 Ivy League football standings
	Conf.					Overall
Team	W		L		T	W		L		T
Yale +	6	–	1	–	0	9	–	1	–	0
Dartmouth +	6	–	1	–	0	6	–	4	–	0
Princeton	5	–	1	–	1	5	–	4	–	1
Harvard	4	–	2	–	1	5	–	4	–	1
Brown	2	–	5	–	0	3	–	7	–	0
Cornell	2	–	5	–	0	3	–	7	–	0
Columbia	1	–	6	–	0	1	–	9	–	0
Penn	1	–	6	–	0	1	–	9	–	0
+ – Conference co-champions

The 1981 Columbia Lions football team was an American football team that represented Columbia University during the 1981 NCAA Division I-A football season. Columbia tied for last place in the Ivy League.

In their second season under head coach Bob Naso, the Lions compiled a 1–9 record and were outscored 243 to 116. Vince Pellini and Tom McNally were the team captains.

The Lions' 1–6 conference record tied for seventh in the Ivy League standings. Columbia was outscored 160 to 93 by Ivy opponents.

This would be Columbia's last season in the NCAA's top level of football competition. Shortly after the season ended, the NCAA reassigned all of the Ivy League teams to the second-tier Division I-AA, which would later be renamed the Football Championship Subdivision.

Columbia played its home games at Baker Field in Upper Manhattan, in New York City.

== Schedule ==
Date	Opponent	Site	Result	Attendance	Source
September 19	Harvard	Baker Field; New York, NY	L 6–23	4,745	
September 26	Lafayette*	Baker Field; New York, NY	L 13–28	3,795	
October 3	Penn	Baker Field; New York, NY	W 20–9	4,375	
October 10	at Princeton	Palmer Stadium; Princeton, NJ	L 14–21	12,360	
October 17	Yale^{†}	Baker Field; New York, NY	L 17–48	10,025	
October 24	Colgate*	Baker Field; New York, NY	L 3–41	4,975	
October 31	at Holy Cross*	Fitton Field; Worcester, MA	L 7–14	8,041	
November 7	Dartmouth	Baker Field; New York, NY	L 7–21	3,860	
November 14	at Cornell	Schoellkopf Field; Ithaca, NY (rivalry)	L 9–15	3,500	
November 21	at Brown	Brown Stadium; Providence, RI	L 20–23	4,800	
*Non-conference game; ^{†}Homecoming
