= 1981 Brown Bears football team =

American college football season

1981 Brown Bears football
- Conference: Ivy League
- Record: 3–7 (2–5 Ivy)
- Head coach: John Anderson (9th season)
- Captains: D. Finneran; T. Holcombe
- Home stadium: Brown Stadium

1981 Ivy League football standings
	Conf.					Overall
Team	W		L		T	W		L		T
Yale +	6	–	1	–	0	9	–	1	–	0
Dartmouth +	6	–	1	–	0	6	–	4	–	0
Princeton	5	–	1	–	1	5	–	4	–	1
Harvard	4	–	2	–	1	5	–	4	–	1
Brown	2	–	5	–	0	3	–	7	–	0
Cornell	2	–	5	–	0	3	–	7	–	0
Columbia	1	–	6	–	0	1	–	9	–	0
Penn	1	–	6	–	0	1	–	9	–	0
+ – Conference co-champions

The 1981 Brown Bears football team was an American football team that represented Brown University during the 1981 NCAA Division I-A football season. Brown tied for fifth place in the Ivy League.

In their ninth season under head coach John Anderson, the Bears compiled a 3–7 record and were outscored 250 to 153. T. Holcombe and D. Finneran were the team captains.

The Bears' 2–5 conference record tied for fifth in the Ivy League standings. They were outscored 185 to 102 by Ivy opponents.

This would be Brown's last season in the NCAA's top level of football competition. Shortly after the season ended, the NCAA reassigned all of the Ivy League teams to the second-tier Division I-AA, which would later be renamed the Football Championship Subdivision.

Brown played its home games at Brown Stadium in Providence, Rhode Island.

== Schedule ==
Date	Opponent	Site	Result	Attendance	Source
September 19	at Yale	Yale Bowl; New Haven, CT	L 7–28	17,000	
September 26	at Army*	Michie Stadium; West Point, NY	L 17–23	31,859	
October 3	Princeton	Brown Stadium; Providence, RI	L 17–20	5,800	
October 10	at Penn	Franklin Field; Philadelphia, PA	W 26–24	11,239	
October 17	Cornell	Brown Stadium; Providence, RI	L 9–14	10,300	
October 24	at Holy Cross*	Fitton Field; Worcester, MA	L 24–34	14,792	
October 31	Harvard	Brown Stadium; Providence, RI	L 7–41	14,600	
November 7	at Rhode Island*	Meade Stadium; Kingston, RI (rivalry)	W 10–8	9,737	
November 14	at Dartmouth	Memorial Field; Hanover, NH	L 13–38	9,500	
November 21	Columbia	Brown Stadium; Providence, RI	W 23–20	4,800	
*Non-conference game
