= 1981 North Texas State Mean Green football team =

American college football season

1981 North Texas State Mean Green football
- Conference: Independent
- Record: 2–9
- Head coach: Bob Tyler (1st season)
- Offensive coordinator: Keith Daniels (1st season)
- Home stadium: Fouts Field; Cotton Bowl

1981 NCAA Division I-A independents football records
	Conf.					Overall
Team	W		L		T	W		L		T
No. 4 Pittsburgh		–		–		11	–	1	–	0
No. 3 Penn State		–		–		10	–	2	–	0
No. 8 Miami (FL)		–		–		9	–	2	–	0
Southern Miss		–		–		9	–	2	–	1
No. 17 West Virginia		–		–		9	–	3	–	0
Colgate		–		–		7	–	3	–	0
Virginia Tech		–		–		7	–	4	–	0
Navy		–		–		7	–	4	–	1
Cincinnati		–		–		6	–	5	–	0
Florida State		–		–		6	–	5	–	0
Holy Cross		–		–		6	–	5	–	0
Tulane		–		–		6	–	5	–	0
UNLV		–		–		6	–	6	–	0
South Carolina		–		–		6	–	6	–	0
Temple		–		–		5	–	5	–	0
Boston College		–		–		5	–	6	–	0
East Carolina		–		–		5	–	6	–	0
Northeast Louisiana		–		–		5	–	6	–	0
Louisville		–		–		5	–	6	–	0
Notre Dame		–		–		5	–	6	–	0
Rutgers		–		–		5	–	6	–	0
William & Mary		–		–		5	–	6	–	0
Syracuse		–		–		4	–	6	–	1
Richmond		–		–		4	–	7	–	0
Army		–		–		3	–	7	–	1
North Texas State		–		–		2	–	9	–	0
Georgia Tech		–		–		1	–	10	–	0
Memphis State		–		–		1	–	10	–	0
Rankings from AP Poll

The 1981 North Texas State Mean Green football team was an American football team that represented North Texas State University (now known as the University of North Texas) during the 1981 NCAA Division I-A football season as an independent. In their only year under head coach Bob Tyler, the team compiled a 2–9 record.

== Schedule ==
Date	Opponent	Site	Result	Attendance	Source
September 5	at Kentucky	Commonwealth Stadium; Lexington, KY	L 6–28	55,262	
September 12	at SMU	Texas Stadium; Irving, TX	L 7–34	20,400	
September 19	at No. 6 Texas	Texas Memorial Stadium; Austin, TX	L 10–23	58,638	
September 26	at Southwestern Louisiana	Cajun Field; Lafayette, LA	L 11–34	15,260	
October 3	Oklahoma State	Cotton Bowl; Dallas, TX	L 0–9	17,500	
October 10	New Mexico State^{†}	Fouts Field; Denton, TX	W 38–16	13,523	
October 24	vs. UT Arlington	Cotton Bowl; Dallas, TX	L 6–7	15,797	
October 31	Southern Miss	Fouts Field; Denton, TX	L 0–22	3,156	
November 7	at Auburn	Jordan–Hare Stadium; Auburn, AL	L 0–20	63,000	
November 14	at Northeast Louisiana	Malone Stadium; Monroe, LA	W 17–14	15,800	
November 28	at San Jose State	Spartan Stadium; San Jose, CA	L 16–28	13,091	
^{†}Homecoming; Rankings from AP Poll released prior to the game
