= 1981 East Carolina Pirates football team =

American college football season

1981 East Carolina Pirates football
- Conference: Independent
- Record: 5–6
- Head coach: Ed Emory (2nd season)
- Defensive coordinator: Norm Parker (2nd season)
- Home stadium: Ficklen Memorial Stadium

1981 NCAA Division I-A independents football records
	Conf.					Overall
Team	W		L		T	W		L		T
No. 4 Pittsburgh		–		–		11	–	1	–	0
No. 3 Penn State		–		–		10	–	2	–	0
No. 8 Miami (FL)		–		–		9	–	2	–	0
Southern Miss		–		–		9	–	2	–	1
No. 17 West Virginia		–		–		9	–	3	–	0
Colgate		–		–		7	–	3	–	0
Virginia Tech		–		–		7	–	4	–	0
Navy		–		–		7	–	4	–	1
Cincinnati		–		–		6	–	5	–	0
Florida State		–		–		6	–	5	–	0
Holy Cross		–		–		6	–	5	–	0
Tulane		–		–		6	–	5	–	0
UNLV		–		–		6	–	6	–	0
South Carolina		–		–		6	–	6	–	0
Temple		–		–		5	–	5	–	0
Boston College		–		–		5	–	6	–	0
East Carolina		–		–		5	–	6	–	0
Northeast Louisiana		–		–		5	–	6	–	0
Louisville		–		–		5	–	6	–	0
Notre Dame		–		–		5	–	6	–	0
Rutgers		–		–		5	–	6	–	0
William & Mary		–		–		5	–	6	–	0
Syracuse		–		–		4	–	6	–	1
Richmond		–		–		4	–	7	–	0
Army		–		–		3	–	7	–	1
North Texas State		–		–		2	–	9	–	0
Georgia Tech		–		–		1	–	10	–	0
Memphis State		–		–		1	–	10	–	0
Rankings from AP Poll

The 1981 East Carolina Pirates football team was an American football team that represented East Carolina University as an independent during the 1981 NCAA Division I-A football season. In their second season under head coach Ed Emory, the team compiled a 5–6 record.

== Schedule ==
Date	Opponent	Site	TV	Result	Attendance	Source
September 5	Western Carolina	Ficklen Memorial Stadium; Greenville, NC		W 42–6	24,873	
September 12	at No. 13 North Carolina	Kenan Memorial Stadium; Chapel Hill, NC		L 0–56	51,300	
September 19	at NC State	Carter–Finley Stadium; Raleigh, NC (rivalry)		L 10–31	52,200	
September 26	Toledo	Ficklen Memorial Stadium; Greenville, NC		W 28–24	21,137	
October 3	at Duke	Wallace Wade Stadium; Durham, NC		L 14–24	18,250	
October 10	at Richmond	City Stadium; Richmond, VA (Tobacco Bowl)		W 17–13	12,621	
October 17	at Southwestern Louisiana	Cajun Field; Lafayette, LA		W 35–31	13,378	
October 24	Miami (FL)	Ficklen Memorial Stadium; Greenville, NC	WITN	L 6–35	20,282	
October 31	at West Virginia	Mountaineer Field; Morgantown, WV		L 3–20	41,364	
November 7	East Tennessee State	Ficklen Memorial Stadium; Greenville, NC		W 66–23	21,342	
November 14	William & Mary	Ficklen Memorial Stadium; Greenville, NC		L 21–31	15,842	
Rankings from AP Poll released prior to the game
