= 1981 Boston College Eagles football team =

American college football season

1981 Boston College Eagles football
- Conference: Independent
- Record: 5–6
- Head coach: Jack Bicknell (1st season)
- Defensive coordinator: Seymour "Red" Kelin (1st season)
- Captains: Jim Budness; Rich Dyer
- Home stadium: Alumni Stadium

1981 Major eastern college football independents records
	Conf.					Overall
Team	W		L		T	W		L		T
No. 3 Penn State $	5	–	0	–	0	10	–	2	–	0
No. 4 Pittsburgh	5	–	1	–	0	11	–	1	–	0
No. 17 West Virginia	3	–	3	–	0	9	–	3	–	0
Temple	2	–	3	–	0	5	–	5	–	0
Syracuse	2	–	4	–	0	4	–	6	–	1
Boston College	1	–	4	–	0	5	–	6	–	0
Rutgers	1	–	4	–	0	5	–	6	–	0
$ – Lambert Trophy Winner; Rankings from AP Poll

1981 NCAA Division I-A independents football records
	Conf.					Overall
Team	W		L		T	W		L		T
No. 4 Pittsburgh		–		–		11	–	1	–	0
No. 3 Penn State		–		–		10	–	2	–	0
No. 8 Miami (FL)		–		–		9	–	2	–	0
Southern Miss		–		–		9	–	2	–	1
No. 17 West Virginia		–		–		9	–	3	–	0
Colgate		–		–		7	–	3	–	0
Virginia Tech		–		–		7	–	4	–	0
Navy		–		–		7	–	4	–	1
Cincinnati		–		–		6	–	5	–	0
Florida State		–		–		6	–	5	–	0
Holy Cross		–		–		6	–	5	–	0
Tulane		–		–		6	–	5	–	0
UNLV		–		–		6	–	6	–	0
South Carolina		–		–		6	–	6	–	0
Temple		–		–		5	–	5	–	0
Boston College		–		–		5	–	6	–	0
East Carolina		–		–		5	–	6	–	0
Northeast Louisiana		–		–		5	–	6	–	0
Louisville		–		–		5	–	6	–	0
Notre Dame		–		–		5	–	6	–	0
Rutgers		–		–		5	–	6	–	0
William & Mary		–		–		5	–	6	–	0
Syracuse		–		–		4	–	6	–	1
Richmond		–		–		4	–	7	–	0
Army		–		–		3	–	7	–	1
North Texas State		–		–		2	–	9	–	0
Georgia Tech		–		–		1	–	10	–	0
Memphis State		–		–		1	–	10	–	0
Rankings from AP Poll

The 1981 Boston College Eagles football team represented Boston College as an independent during the 1981 NCAA Division I-A football season. In its first season under head coach Jack Bicknell, the team compiled a 5–6 record and was outscored by a combined total of 298 to 243. Three of the team's losses were to teams then ranked among the top 10 in the AP Poll.

The team was led by freshman quarterback Doug Flutie who completed 105 of 192 passes for 1,652 passing yards, 10 touchdowns and eight interceptions. Other statistical leaders included Leo Smith with 403 rushing yards, Brian Brennan with 726 receiving yards, kicker John Cooper with 55 points scored (28 extra points and 9 field goals), and defensive back George Radachowsky with seven interceptions. Flutie, Brennan, and Radachowsky all went on to play in the National Football League, as did defensive tackle Joe Nash.

The team played its home games at Alumni Stadium in Chestnut Hill, Massachusetts.

== Schedule ==
Date	Opponent	Site	Result	Attendance	Source
September 19	Texas A&M	Alumni Stadium; Chestnut Hill, MA	W 13–12	31,000	
September 26	at No. 9 North Carolina	Kenan Memorial Stadium; Chapel Hill, NC	L 14–56	48,000	
October 3	West Virginia	Alumni Stadium; Chestnut Hill, MA	L 10–38	17,235	
October 10	at No. 2 Penn State	Beaver Stadium; University Park, PA	L 7–38	84,473	
October 17	Navy	Alumni Stadium; Chestnut Hill, MA	L 10–25	31,000	
October 24	at Army	Michie Stadium; West Point, NY	W 41–6	39,357	
October 31	No. 2 Pittsburgh	Alumni Stadium; Chestnut Hill, MA	L 24–29	25,500	
November 7	UMass	Alumni Stadium; Chestnut Hill, MA (rivalry)	W 52–22	20,400	
November 14	at Syracuse	Carrier Dome; Syracuse, NY	L 17–27	35,623	
November 21	Rutgers	Alumni Stadium; Chestnut Hill, MA	W 27–21	16,500	
November 28	at Holy Cross	Fitton Field; Worcester, MA (rivalry)	W 28–24	22,500	
Rankings from AP Poll released prior to the game

== Roster ==
1981 Boston College Eagles football team roster
Players
Coaches
Offense

Pos.	#	Name	Class
C	62	Jack Belcher	Jr
WR	13	Brian Brennan	So
G		Ed Broderick	Jr
RB	32	Jim Browne	Fr
QB	22	Doug Flutie	Fr
QB	7	John Loughery	Jr
OT	70	Steve Lively	Jr
OL	79	Mark MacDonald	Fr
OT	78	Dave Paulik	So
G	65	Gerry Raymond	Sr
RB	24	Leo Smith	Sr

Defense

Pos.	#	Name	Class
SS	5	Vic Crawford	Jr
LB	99	Steve DeOssie	Fr
S	6	Rich Dyer	Sr
DT	52	Scott Harrington	Fr
DT	95	Joe Nash	Sr
DT	73	Todd Nelson	Jr
DB	15	George Radachowsky	So
DE	46	Paul Shaw	Jr
DE	50	Greg Storr	Sr

Special teams

Pos.	#	Name	Class

Head coach

- Jack Bicknell

Coordinators/assistant coaches

Legend

- (C) Team captain
- (S) Suspended
- (I) Ineligible
- Injured
- Redshirt
