= 1981 Harvard Crimson football team =

American college football season

1981 Harvard Crimson football
- Conference: Ivy League
- Record: 5–4–1 (4–2–1 Ivy)
- Head coach: Joe Restic (11th season)
- Captain: Peter M. Coppinger
- Home stadium: Harvard Stadium

1981 Ivy League football standings
	Conf.					Overall
Team	W		L		T	W		L		T
Yale +	6	–	1	–	0	9	–	1	–	0
Dartmouth +	6	–	1	–	0	6	–	4	–	0
Princeton	5	–	1	–	1	5	–	4	–	1
Harvard	4	–	2	–	1	5	–	4	–	1
Brown	2	–	5	–	0	3	–	7	–	0
Cornell	2	–	5	–	0	3	–	7	–	0
Columbia	1	–	6	–	0	1	–	9	–	0
Penn	1	–	6	–	0	1	–	9	–	0
+ – Conference co-champions

The 1981 Harvard Crimson football team was an American football team that represented Harvard University during the 1981 NCAA Division I-A football season. Harvard finished fourth in the Ivy League.

In their 11th year under head coach Joe Restic, the Crimson compiled a 5–4–1 record and outscored opponents 218 to 173. Peter M. Coppinger was the team captain.

Harvard's 4–2–1 conference record placed fourth in the Ivy League standings. The Crimson outscored Ivy opponents 163 to 99.

This would be Harvard's last season in the NCAA's top level of football competition. Shortly after the season ended, the NCAA reassigned all of the Ivy League teams to the second-tier Division I-AA, which would later be renamed the Football Championship Subdivision.

Harvard played its home games at Harvard Stadium in the Allston neighborhood of Boston, Massachusetts.

== Schedule ==
Date	Opponent	Site	Result	Attendance	Source
September 19	at Columbia	Baker Field; New York, NY	W 23–6	4,745	
September 26	Holy Cross*	Harvard Stadium; Boston, MA	L 19–33	17,000	
October 3	Army*	Harvard Stadium; Boston, MA	L 13–27	16,000	
October 10	at Cornell	Schoellkopf Field; Ithaca, NY	W 27–10	12,500	
October 17	Dartmouth	Harvard Stadium; Boston, MA (rivalry)	L 10–24	25,000	
October 24	Princeton	Harvard Stadium; Boston, MA (rivalry)	T 17–17	17,500	
October 31	at Brown	Brown Stadium; Providence, RI	W 41–7	14,600	
November 7	at William & Mary*	Cary Field; Williamsburg, VA	W 23–14	16,000	
November 14	Penn	Harvard Stadium; Boston, MA (rivalry)	W 45–7	10,500	
November 21	at Yale	Yale Bowl; New Haven, CT (The Game)	L 0–28	75,300	
*Non-conference game
