= 1981 Cincinnati Bearcats football team =

American college football season

1981 Cincinnati Bearcats football
- Conference: Independent
- Record: 6–5
- Head coach: Mike Gottfried (1st season)
- Home stadium: Nippert Stadium

1981 NCAA Division I-A independents football records
	Conf.					Overall
Team	W		L		T	W		L		T
No. 4 Pittsburgh		–		–		11	–	1	–	0
No. 3 Penn State		–		–		10	–	2	–	0
No. 8 Miami (FL)		–		–		9	–	2	–	0
Southern Miss		–		–		9	–	2	–	1
No. 17 West Virginia		–		–		9	–	3	–	0
Colgate		–		–		7	–	3	–	0
Virginia Tech		–		–		7	–	4	–	0
Navy		–		–		7	–	4	–	1
Cincinnati		–		–		6	–	5	–	0
Florida State		–		–		6	–	5	–	0
Holy Cross		–		–		6	–	5	–	0
Tulane		–		–		6	–	5	–	0
UNLV		–		–		6	–	6	–	0
South Carolina		–		–		6	–	6	–	0
Temple		–		–		5	–	5	–	0
Boston College		–		–		5	–	6	–	0
East Carolina		–		–		5	–	6	–	0
Northeast Louisiana		–		–		5	–	6	–	0
Louisville		–		–		5	–	6	–	0
Notre Dame		–		–		5	–	6	–	0
Rutgers		–		–		5	–	6	–	0
William & Mary		–		–		5	–	6	–	0
Syracuse		–		–		4	–	6	–	1
Richmond		–		–		4	–	7	–	0
Army		–		–		3	–	7	–	1
North Texas State		–		–		2	–	9	–	0
Georgia Tech		–		–		1	–	10	–	0
Memphis State		–		–		1	–	10	–	0
Rankings from AP Poll

The 1981 Cincinnati Bearcats football team represented University of Cincinnati as an independent during the 1981 NCAA Division I-A football season. Led by first-year head coach Mike Gottfried, the Bearcats compiled a record of 6–5. The team played home games at Nippert Stadium in Cincinnati.

== Schedule ==
Date	Opponent	Site	Result	Attendance	Source
September 5	Youngstown State	Nippert Stadium; Cincinnati, OH	L 13–16	8,304	
September 12	at No. 9 Penn State	Beaver Stadium; University Park, PA	L 0–52	84,342	
September 19	at No. 7 Pittsburgh	Pitt Stadium; Pittsburgh, PA (River City Rivalry)	L 7–38	40,172	
September 26	Rutgers	Nippert Stadium; Cincinnati, OH	W 10–0	13,657	
October 10	at Ohio	Peden Stadium; Athens, OH	W 19–9		
October 17	Richmond	Nippert Stadium; Cincinnati, OH	W 27–18		
October 24	Temple	Nippert Stadium; Cincinnati, OH	L 13–24	11,124	
October 31	Tulane^{†}	Nippert Stadium; Cincinnati, OH	W 17–13	19,486	
November 7	Memphis State	Nippert Stadium; Cincinnati, OH (rivalry)	W 38–7	10,233	
November 14	Louisville	Nippert Stadium; Cincinnati, OH (rivalry)	W 24–0	15,617	
November 21	at Miami (OH)	Miami Field; Oxford, OH (Victory Bell)	L 3–7	13,457	
^{†}Homecoming; Rankings from AP Poll released prior to the game

== Roster ==
1981 Cincinnati Bearcats football team roster
Players
Coaches
Offense

Pos.	#	Name	Class
QB	6	Danny Barrett	Jr
FB	26	Don Goodman	So
OT	69	Kari Yli-Renko	Sr

Defense

Pos.	#	Name	Class
DT	82	George Jamison	So
DB	10	Mel Jenkins	So
DB	23	Steve Ries	Sr
DB	44	Tim Schira	Sr

Special teams

Pos.	#	Name	Class

Head coach

- Mike Gottfried

Coordinators/assistant coaches

Legend

- (C) Team captain
- (S) Suspended
- (I) Ineligible
- Injured
- Redshirt
