= 1981 Southern Miss Golden Eagles football team =

American college football season

1981 Southern Miss Golden Eagles football

Tangerine Bowl, L 17–19 vs. Missouri
- Conference: Independent

Ranking
- Coaches: No. 19
- Record: 9–2–1
- Head coach: Bobby Collins (7th season)
- Home stadium: M. M. Roberts Stadium

1981 NCAA Division I-A independents football records
	Conf.					Overall
Team	W		L		T	W		L		T
No. 4 Pittsburgh		–		–		11	–	1	–	0
No. 3 Penn State		–		–		10	–	2	–	0
No. 8 Miami (FL)		–		–		9	–	2	–	0
Southern Miss		–		–		9	–	2	–	1
No. 17 West Virginia		–		–		9	–	3	–	0
Colgate		–		–		7	–	3	–	0
Virginia Tech		–		–		7	–	4	–	0
Navy		–		–		7	–	4	–	1
Cincinnati		–		–		6	–	5	–	0
Florida State		–		–		6	–	5	–	0
Holy Cross		–		–		6	–	5	–	0
Tulane		–		–		6	–	5	–	0
UNLV		–		–		6	–	6	–	0
South Carolina		–		–		6	–	6	–	0
Temple		–		–		5	–	5	–	0
Boston College		–		–		5	–	6	–	0
East Carolina		–		–		5	–	6	–	0
Northeast Louisiana		–		–		5	–	6	–	0
Louisville		–		–		5	–	6	–	0
Notre Dame		–		–		5	–	6	–	0
Rutgers		–		–		5	–	6	–	0
William & Mary		–		–		5	–	6	–	0
Syracuse		–		–		4	–	6	–	1
Richmond		–		–		4	–	7	–	0
Army		–		–		3	–	7	–	1
North Texas State		–		–		2	–	9	–	0
Georgia Tech		–		–		1	–	10	–	0
Memphis State		–		–		1	–	10	–	0
Rankings from AP Poll

The 1981 Southern Miss Golden Eagles football team was an American football team that represented the University of Southern Mississippi as an independent during the 1981 NCAA Division I-A football season. In their seventh year under head coach Bobby Collins, the team compiled a 9–2–1 record.

== Schedule ==
Date	Opponent	Rank	Site	TV	Result	Attendance	Source
September 5	Southwestern Louisiana		M. M. Roberts Stadium; Hattiesburg, MS		W 33–7	23,576	
September 19	Tulane		M. M. Roberts Stadium; Hattiesburg, MS (rivalry)		W 21–3	32,756	
September 26	at Richmond		City Stadium; Richmond, VA		W 17–10	12,500	
October 3	UT Arlington^{†}		M. M. Roberts Stadium; Hattiesburg, MS		W 52–9	29,348	
October 10	at No. 7 Alabama		Legion Field; Birmingham, AL		T 13–13	76,400	
October 17	at Memphis State		Liberty Bowl Memorial Stadium; Memphis, TN (rivalry)		W 10–0	14,252	
October 31	at North Texas State		Fouts Field; Denton, TX		W 22–0	3,156	
November 7	vs. No. 15 Mississippi State	No. 20	Mississippi Veterans Memorial Stadium; Jackson, MS		W 7–6	64,112	
November 14	at No. 20 Florida State	No. 14	Doak Campbell Stadium; Tallahassee, FL	ABC	W 58–14	51,819	
November 21	at Louisville	No. 9	Cardinal Stadium; Louisville, KY		L 10–13	12,940	
November 28	Lamar	No. 17	M. M. Roberts Stadium; Hattiesburg, MS		W 45–14	31,842	
December 19	vs. Missouri	No. 18	Orlando Stadium; Orlando, FL (Tangerine Bowl)		L 17–19	50,045	
^{†}Homecoming; Rankings from AP Poll released prior to the game
