= 1981 Navy Midshipmen football team =

American college football season

1981 Navy Midshipmen football

Liberty Bowl, L 28–31 vs. Ohio State
- Conference: Independent
- Record: 7–4–1
- Head coach: George Welsh (9th season)
- Captains: Tim Jordan; Eddie Meyers
- Home stadium: Navy–Marine Corps Memorial Stadium

1981 NCAA Division I-A independents football records
	Conf.					Overall
Team	W		L		T	W		L		T
No. 4 Pittsburgh		–		–		11	–	1	–	0
No. 3 Penn State		–		–		10	–	2	–	0
No. 8 Miami (FL)		–		–		9	–	2	–	0
Southern Miss		–		–		9	–	2	–	1
No. 17 West Virginia		–		–		9	–	3	–	0
Colgate		–		–		7	–	3	–	0
Virginia Tech		–		–		7	–	4	–	0
Navy		–		–		7	–	4	–	1
Cincinnati		–		–		6	–	5	–	0
Florida State		–		–		6	–	5	–	0
Holy Cross		–		–		6	–	5	–	0
Tulane		–		–		6	–	5	–	0
UNLV		–		–		6	–	6	–	0
South Carolina		–		–		6	–	6	–	0
Temple		–		–		5	–	5	–	0
Boston College		–		–		5	–	6	–	0
East Carolina		–		–		5	–	6	–	0
Northeast Louisiana		–		–		5	–	6	–	0
Louisville		–		–		5	–	6	–	0
Notre Dame		–		–		5	–	6	–	0
Rutgers		–		–		5	–	6	–	0
William & Mary		–		–		5	–	6	–	0
Syracuse		–		–		4	–	6	–	1
Richmond		–		–		4	–	7	–	0
Army		–		–		3	–	7	–	1
North Texas State		–		–		2	–	9	–	0
Georgia Tech		–		–		1	–	10	–	0
Memphis State		–		–		1	–	10	–	0
Rankings from AP Poll

The 1981 Navy Midshipmen football team represented the United States Naval Academy (USNA) as an independent during the 1981 NCAA Division I-A football season. The team was led by ninth-year head coach George Welsh.

== Schedule ==
Date	Time	Opponent	Site	TV	Result	Attendance	Source
September 12		The Citadel	Navy–Marine Corps Memorial Stadium; Annapolis, MD		W 17–7	18,135	
September 19		Eastern Kentucky	Navy–Marine Corps Memorial Stadium; Annapolis, MD		W 24–0	16,379	
September 26		at Michigan	Michigan Stadium; Ann Arbor, MI		L 16–21	105,213	
October 3		at Yale	Yale Bowl; New Haven, CT	ABC	L 19–23	38,000	
October 10		Air Force	Navy–Marine Corps Memorial Stadium; Annapolis, MD (Commander-in-Chief's Trophy)		W 30–13	31,181	
October 17		at Boston College	Alumni Stadium; Chestnut Hill, MA		W 25–10	31,000	
October 24		William & Mary^{†}	Navy–Marine Corps Memorial Stadium; Annapolis, MD		W 27–0	25,014	
October 31		at Notre Dame	Notre Dame Stadium; Notre Dame, IN (rivalry)		L 0–38	59,075	
November 7		Syracuse	Navy–Marine Corps Memorial Stadium; Annapolis, MD		W 35–23	23,355	
November 14		at Georgia Tech	Grant Field; Atlanta, GA		W 20–14	20,129	
December 5		vs. Army	Veterans Stadium; Philadelphia, PA (Army–Navy Game)	ABC	T 3–3	60,470	
December 30	8:00 p.m.	vs. Ohio State	Liberty Bowl Memorial Stadium; Memphis, TN (Liberty Bowl)	USA	L 28–31	43,216	
^{†}Homecoming; All times are in Eastern time

== Games summaries ==
=== Syracuse ===
- Eddie Meyers 298 rush yards, 3 TD

=== Army ===
	1	2	3	4	Total
Navy	0	3	0	0	3
Army	0	0	3	0	3

- NAVY: Steve Fehr 35 FG
- ARMY: Dave Aucoin FG, 4:37

== Roster ==
1981 Navy Midshipmen football team roster
Players
Coaches
Offense

Pos.	#	Name	Class
OT	74	Keith Boring	Sr
OT	71	Doug Borrebach	So
TE	83	Mark Fitzgerald	Sr
G	63	Jeff Johnson	Sr
QB	16	Jeff Korn	Jr
C	51	Dennis McCall	Jr
RB	30	Napoleon McCallum	Fr
RB	40	Eddie Meyers (C)	Sr
WR	89	Troy Mitchell	Sr
QB	15	Marco Pagnanelli	So
TE	82	Greg Papajohn	Sr
RB	38	Andy Skehan	Jr
RB	49	Tim Jackson	Sr
G	59	Mark Woodhouse	Jr
WR	88	Chris Yelder	Sr

Defense

Pos.	#	Name	Class
DB	41	John Foley	Sr
LB	57	Todd Hastings	So
DT	56	Tim Jordan (C)	Sr
LB	50	Ken Olson	Sr
DT	73	Steve Peters	So
LB		Andy Ponseigo
DB	47	Eliott Reagans	Sr
DE	84	Mike Rouser	Sr
DB	14	Jeff Shoemake	Jr

Special teams

Pos.	#	Name	Class
K	24	Steve Fehr	Sr

Head coach

- George Welsh

Coordinators/assistant coaches

Legend

- (C) Team captain
- (S) Suspended
- (I) Ineligible
- Injured
- Redshirt
