= 1981 Penn Quakers football team =

American college football season

1981 Penn Quakers football
- Conference: Ivy League
- Record: 1–9 (1–6 Ivy)
- Head coach: Jerry Berndt (1st season)
- Home stadium: Franklin Field

1981 Ivy League football standings
	Conf.					Overall
Team	W		L		T	W		L		T
Yale +	6	–	1	–	0	9	–	1	–	0
Dartmouth +	6	–	1	–	0	6	–	4	–	0
Princeton	5	–	1	–	1	5	–	4	–	1
Harvard	4	–	2	–	1	5	–	4	–	1
Brown	2	–	5	–	0	3	–	7	–	0
Cornell	2	–	5	–	0	3	–	7	–	0
Columbia	1	–	6	–	0	1	–	9	–	0
Penn	1	–	6	–	0	1	–	9	–	0
+ – Conference co-champions

The 1981 Penn Quakers football team represented the University of Pennsylvania in the 1981 NCAA Division I-A football season.

== Schedule ==
Date	Opponent	Site	Result	Attendance	Source
September 19	Cornell	Franklin Field; Philadelphia, PA (rivalry)	W 29–22	15,871	
September 26	at Lehigh*	Taylor Stadium; Bethlehem, PA	L 0–58	11,436	
October 3	at Columbia	Baker Field; New York, NY	L 9–20	4,375	
October 10	Brown	Franklin Field; Philadelphia, PA	L 24–26	11,239	
October 24	at Yale	Yale Bowl; New Haven, CT	L 3–24	24,500	
October 31	Princeton^{†}	Franklin Field; Philadelphia, PA (rivalry)	L 30–38	20,333	
November 7	Delaware*	Franklin Field; Philadelphia, PA	L 6–40	10,117	
November 14	at Harvard	Harvard Stadium; Boston, MA (rivalry)	L 7–45	10,500	
November 21	Dartmouth	Franklin Field; Philadelphia, PA	L 13–33	9,757	
November 26	at Richmond*	City Stadium; Richmond, VA	L 12–18	7,514	
*Non-conference game; ^{†}Homecoming
