= 1981 Cornell Big Red football team =

American college football season

1981 Cornell Big Red football
- Conference: Ivy League
- Record: 3–7 (2–5 Ivy)
- Head coach: Bob Blackman (5th season)
- Defensive coordinator: Pete Noyes (1st season)
- Captains: Dave Kimichik; Steve Ross
- Home stadium: Schoellkopf Field

1981 Ivy League football standings
	Conf.					Overall
Team	W		L		T	W		L		T
Yale +	6	–	1	–	0	9	–	1	–	0
Dartmouth +	6	–	1	–	0	6	–	4	–	0
Princeton	5	–	1	–	1	5	–	4	–	1
Harvard	4	–	2	–	1	5	–	4	–	1
Brown	2	–	5	–	0	3	–	7	–	0
Cornell	2	–	5	–	0	3	–	7	–	0
Columbia	1	–	6	–	0	1	–	9	–	0
Penn	1	–	6	–	0	1	–	9	–	0
+ – Conference co-champions

The 1981 Cornell Big Red football team represented Cornell University as a member of the Ivy League during the 1981 NCAA Division I-A football season. Led by fifth-year head coach Bob Blackman, the Big Red compiled an overall record of 3–7 with a mark of 2–5 in conference play, tying for fifth place in the Ivy League. Cornell played home games a Schoellkopf Field in Ithaca, New York.

== Schedule ==
Date	Opponent	Site	Result	Attendance	Source
September 19	at Penn	Franklin Field; Philadelphia, PA (rivalry)	L 22–29	15,871	
September 26	Colgate	Schoellkopf Field; Ithaca, NY (rivalry)	L 10–34	12,100	
October 3	at Rutgers	Rutgers Stadium; Piscataway, NJ	L 17–31	10,125	
October 10	Harvard	Schoellkopf Field; Ithaca, NY	L 10–27	12,500	
October 17	at Brown	Brown Stadium; Providence, RI	W 14–9	10,300	
October 24	at Dartmouth	Memorial Field; Hanover, NH (rivalry)	L 7–42	12,054	
October 31	Bucknell	Schoellkopf Field; Ithaca, NY	W 22–15	4,100	
November 7	Yale	Schoellkopf Field; Ithaca, NY	L 17–23	13,000	
November 14	Columbia	Schoellkopf Field; Ithaca, NY (rivalry)	W 15–9	3,500	
November 21	at Princeton	Palmer Stadium; Princeton, NJ	L 14–37	9,009	
