= 1981 Yale Bulldogs football team =

American college football season

1981 Yale Bulldogs football

Ivy League co-champion
- Conference: Ivy League
- Record: 9–1 (6–1 Ivy)
- Head coach: Carmen Cozza (17th season)
- Home stadium: Yale Bowl

1981 Ivy League football standings
	Conf.					Overall
Team	W		L		T	W		L		T
Yale +	6	–	1	–	0	9	–	1	–	0
Dartmouth +	6	–	1	–	0	6	–	4	–	0
Princeton	5	–	1	–	1	5	–	4	–	1
Harvard	4	–	2	–	1	5	–	4	–	1
Brown	2	–	5	–	0	3	–	7	–	0
Cornell	2	–	5	–	0	3	–	7	–	0
Columbia	1	–	6	–	0	1	–	9	–	0
Penn	1	–	6	–	0	1	–	9	–	0
+ – Conference co-champions

The 1981 Yale Bulldogs football team represented Yale University in the 1981 NCAA Division I-A football season. The Bulldogs were led by 17th-year head coach Carmen Cozza and played their home games at the Yale Bowl. They played as a member of the Ivy League. The Bulldogs finished the season with an overall record of 9–1, including a record of 6–1 in Ivy League play, giving them a share of the Ivy League championship with Dartmouth.

== Schedule ==
Date	Opponent	Site	TV	Result	Attendance	Source
September 19	Brown	Yale Bowl; New Haven, CT		W 28–7	17,000	
September 26	No. 6 Connecticut*	Yale Bowl; New Haven, CT		W 27–18	36,000	
October 3	Navy*	Yale Bowl; New Haven, CT	ABC	W 23–19	38,000	
October 10	at Holy Cross*	Fitton Field; Worcester, MA		W 29–28	21,601	
October 17	at Columbia	Baker Field; New York, NY		W 48–17	10,025	
October 24	Penn	Yale Bowl; New Haven, CT		W 24–3	24,500	
October 31	Dartmouth	Yale Bowl; New Haven, CT	ABC	W 24–3	32,500	
November 7	at Cornell	Schoellkopf Field; Ithaca, NY		W 23–17	13,000	
November 14	at Princeton	Palmer Stadium; Princeton, NJ (rivalry)		L 31–35	20,303	
November 21	Harvard	Yale Bowl; New Haven, CT (The Game)		W 28–0	75,300	
*Non-conference game; Rankings from NCAA Division I-AA Football Committee Poll released prior to the game

== Roster ==
1981 Yale Bulldogs football team roster
Players
Coaches
Offense

Pos.	#	Name	Class
G	51	Bill Basa	Jr
OT	71	Jim Britt	Sr
WR	88	Bob Burkitt	Sr
QB	7	Rick Crews	Jr
RB	34	Jim Dalzell	Jr
QB	17	Joe Dufek	Jr
RB	33	Rich Diana	Sr
WR	81	Curt Grieve	Sr
TE	84	Tom Kokoska	Sr
C	55	Jim Lang	Jr
WR	85	Tom Moyer	Sr
QB	19	John Rogan	Sr
WR	86	Scott Sheldon	Jr

Defense

Pos.	#	Name	Class
DB	14	Kerry Bensinger	Sr
DB	6	Brian Casey	Jr
CB	12	David Daugherty	Sr
DE	99	Doug Holowinko	Jr
LB	42	Jim Joiner	Jr
DT	89	Bill Kirk	Sr
LB	47	John Plazza	Jr
DB	21	Joe Pont	So
LB	23	Jeff Rohrer	Sr
DE	78	Dennis Tulsiak	Sr
DB	10	George Vitelli	Sr

Special teams

Pos.	#	Name	Class
K	1	Jeff Arons	Jr
K	3	Tony Jones	Sr
K	11	Gary Whitman	Sr

Head coach

- Carmen Cozza

Coordinators/assistant coaches

Legend

- (C) Team captain
- (S) Suspended
- (I) Ineligible
- Injured
- Redshirt

== NFL draft ==
The following Bulldogs were selected in the National Football League draft following the season.

Round	Pick	Player	Position	NFL team
2	53	Jeff Rohrer	LB	Dallas Cowboys
5	136	Rich Diana	RB	Miami Dolphins
6	159	Curt Grieve	WR	Philadelphia Eagles
