= Bob Clasby =

American football player (born 1960)

No. 91, 98, 79
- Positions: Defensive tackle Defensive end

Personal information
- Born: September 28, 1960 (age 66); Detroit, Michigan, U.S.
- Listed height: 6 ft 5 in (1.96 m)
- Listed weight: 260 lb (118 kg)

Career information
- High school: Boston College (Boston, Massachusetts)
- College: Notre Dame
- NFL draft: 1983: 9th round, 236th overall pick

Career history
- Seattle Seahawks (1983)*; Chicago Blitz (1984); Jacksonville Bulls (1984-1985); St. Louis/Phoenix Cardinals (1986–1990)
- * Offseason or practice squad member only

Career NFL statistics
- Sacks: 14.5
- Fumble recoveries: 2
- Interceptions: 1
- Stats at Pro Football Reference

Robert James Clasby (born September 28, 1960) is an American former professional football player who was a defensive lineman for five seasons in the National Football League (NFL). He was selected by the Seattle Seahawks in the ninth round of the 1983 NFL draft, after playing college football for Notre Dame Fighting Irish. He played for five seasons in the NFL for the St. Louis/Phoenix Cardinals.
