= Jerry Baker (American football) =

American football player (born 1960)

No. 74
- Position: Defensive tackle

Personal information
- Born: March 6, 1960 (age 66); Bartow, Florida
- Listed height: 6 ft 2 in (1.88 m)
- Listed weight: 297 lb (135 kg)

Career information
- High school: Fort Meade
- College: Tulane

Career history
- Denver Broncos (1983)
- Stats at Pro Football Reference

Jerry Eugene Baker (born March 6, 1960) is an American former football defensive tackle who played in five games for the Denver Broncos during the 1983 National Football League season. He played college football at Tulane University.
