= Mike Rodrigue =

Canadian gridiron football player (born 1960)

Mike Rodrigue (born January 17, 1960) is a former Canadian football wide receiver in the Canadian Football League (CFL) who played for the Montreal Concordes. He played college football for the Miami Hurricanes. He was drafted by the Dolphins in the 12th round of the 1982 NFL draft with the 331st overall pick.

He played quarterback and wide receiver at Miami.
