= Dave Boisture =

American football player (born 1959)

Profile
- Position: Quarterback

Personal information
- Born: February 28, 1959 (age 67); Detroit, Michigan, U.S.
- Listed height: 6 ft 1 in (1.85 m)
- Listed weight: 192 lb (87 kg)

Career information
- High school: Franklin, Kent School
- College: Holy Cross
- NFL draft: 1982: undrafted

Career history
- New York Jets (1982)*; New Jersey Generals (1983); Pittsburgh Maulers (1984); Baltimore Stars (1985)
- * Offseason or practice squad member only

Dave Boisture (born February 28, 1959) is an American former football quarterback who played for the New Jersey Generals, Pittsburgh Maulers and Baltimore Stars of the United States Football League (USFL). He played college football at College of the Holy Cross.

His father, Dan Boisture, was the head coach of the Detroit Wheels of the World Football League in 1974.
