= Aaron Moog =

American football player (born 1962)

Aaron Mong
No. 98
- Position: Defensive end

Personal information
- Born: February 3, 1962 (age 64); Loma Linda, California, U.S.
- Listed height: 6 ft 4 in (1.93 m)
- Listed weight: 260 lb (118 kg)

Career information
- High school: Chaffey
- College: UNLV
- NFL draft: 1985: undrafted

Career history
- Washington Redskins (1985)*; Cleveland Browns (1987)
- * Offseason or practice squad member only

Awards and highlights
- PCAA Co-Defensive Player of the Year (1984); 2× First-team All-PCAA (1983, 1984)
- Stats at Pro Football Reference

Aaron John Moog (born February 3, 1962) is an American former professional football player who was a defensive end for the Cleveland Browns of the National Football League (NFL). He played college football for the UNLV Rebels.
