= Speedy Neal =

American football player (born 1962)

No. 41
- Position: Running back

Personal information
- Born: August 26, 1962 (age 64); Key West, Florida, U.S.
- Listed height: 6 ft 2 in (1.88 m)
- Listed weight: 254 lb (115 kg)

Career information
- High school: Key West
- College: Miami
- NFL draft: 1984: 3rd round, 82nd overall pick

Career history
- Buffalo Bills (1984); Miami Dolphins (1986)*
- * Offseason or practice squad member only

Awards and highlights
- National champion (1983)

Career NFL statistics
- Rushing yards: 175
- Rushing average: 3.6
- Touchdowns: 1
- Stats at Pro Football Reference

Robert "Speedy" Neal (born August 26, 1962) is an American former professional football player who was a running back for the Buffalo Bills of the National Football League (NFL) in 1984. He played college football for the Miami Hurricanes and was selected by the Bills in the third round of the 1984 NFL draft with the 82nd overall pick. Neal appeared in a total of 12 career games (2 starts).
