= 1981 Maine Black Bears football team =

American college football season

1981 Maine Black Bears football
- Conference: Yankee Conference
- Record: 3–7–1 (1–4 Yankee)
- Head coach: Ron Rogerson (1st season)
- Offensive coordinator: Chris Raymond (1st season)
- Home stadium: Alumni Field

1981 Yankee Conference football standings
	Conf.					Overall
Team	W		L		T	W		L		T
Rhode Island +^	4	–	1	–	0	6	–	6	–	0
No. T–10 UMass +	4	–	1	–	0	6	–	3	–	0
Boston University	3	–	2	–	0	6	–	5	–	0
No. T–10 New Hampshire	2	–	3	–	0	7	–	3	–	0
Connecticut	1	–	4	–	0	4	–	7	–	0
Maine	1	–	4	–	0	3	–	7	–	1
+ – Conference co-champions; ^ – NCAA Division I-AA playoff participant; Rankings from NCAA Division I-AA Football Committee poll

The 1981 Maine Black Bears football team represented the University of Maine as a member of the Yankee Conference during the 1981 NCAA Division I-AA football season. Led by first-year head coach Ron Rogerson, the Black Bears compiled an overall record of 3–7–1 and a mark of 1–4 in conference play, tying for fifth place in the Yankee Conference.

== Schedule ==
Date	Opponent	Site	Result	Attendance	Source
September 5	Kutztown*	Alumni Field; Orono, ME	T 17–17		
September 12	at Lehigh*	Taylor Stadium; Bethlehem, PA	L 10–24	10,000	
September 19	at Rhode Island	Meade Stadium; Kingston, RI	L 10–21		
September 26	Boston University	Alumni Field; Orono, ME	L 7–48		
October 3	at Lafayette*	Fisher Stadium; Easton, PA	L 0–17		
October 10	No. 5 New Hampshire	Alumni Field; Orono, ME	W 26–16		
October 17	at UMass	Alumni Stadium; Hadley, MA	L 7–20		
October 24	Connecticut	Alumni Field; Orono, ME	L 10–31	2,300	
October 31	at Northeastern*	Parsons Field; Brookline, MA	W 9–3		
November 7	at Princeton*	Palmer Stadium; Princeton, NJ	W 55–44	6,887	
November 14	at No. T–10 Delaware*	Delaware Stadium; Newark, DE	L 35–42	16,743	
*Non-conference game; Rankings from NCAA Division I-AA Football Committee Poll released prior to the game

== Roster ==
1981 Maine Black Bears football team roster
Players
Coaches
Offense

Pos.	#	Name	Class
QB	10	Mike Beauchemin	Jr
QB	6	Jim Evans	So
C	67	Steve Keating	Sr
WR	2	Al Paquette	Sr

Defense

Pos.	#	Name	Class

Special teams

Pos.	#	Name	Class

Head coach

- Ron Rogerson

Coordinators/assistant coaches

- Mark Harriman
  (Graduate assistant)

Legend

- (C) Team captain
- (S) Suspended
- (I) Ineligible
- Injured
- Redshirt
