= 1981 Bucknell Bison football team =

American college football season

1981 Bucknell Bison football
- Conference: Independent
- Record: 4–6
- Head coach: Bob Curtis (7th season)
- Captains: Ken Jenkins; Jeff Miller
- Home stadium: Memorial Stadium

1981 NCAA Division I-AA independents football standings
	Conf.			Overall
Team	W	L	T	W		L		T
No. 8 Lafayette		–		9	–	2	–	0
No. 7 Delaware ^		–		9	–	3	–	0
No. 6 Tennessee State ^		–		9	–	3	–	0
Southeastern Louisiana		–		8	–	3	–	0
Lehigh		–		8	–	3	–	0
Nicholls State		–		5	–	5	–	1
Northwestern State		–		4	–	6	–	0
Bucknell		–		4	–	6	–	0
Northeastern		–		3	–	7	–	0
James Madison		–		3	–	8	–	0
^ – NCAA Division I-AA playoff participant; Rankings from NCAA Division I-AA Football Committee poll

The 1981 Bucknell Bison football team was an American football team that represented Bucknell University as an independent during the 1981 NCAA Division I-AA football season.

In their sixth year under head coach Bob Curtis, the Bison compiled a 4–6 record. Ken Jenkins and Jeff Miller were the team captains.

Bucknell played its home games at Memorial Stadium on the university campus in Lewisburg, Pennsylvania.

== Schedule ==
Date	Opponent	Site	Result	Attendance	Source
September 12	Connecticut	Memorial Stadium; Lewisburg, PA	L 7–27	4,500	
September 19	at Merchant Marine	Tomb Field; Kings Point, NY	W 35–6	3,015	
September 26	Rochester	Memorial Stadium; Lewisburg, PA	W 27–0		
October 3	Davidson^	Memorial Stadium; Lewisburg, PA	W 23–3	6,200	
October 10	at No. 10 Lafayette	Fisher Field; Easton, PA	L 0–37	11,500	
October 17	at West Chester	John A. Farrell Stadium; West Chester, PA	W 20–14		
October 24	No. 9 Lehigh^{†}	Memorial Stadium; Lewisburg, PA	L 0–18	8,800	
October 31	at Cornell	Schoellkopf Field; Ithaca, NY	L 15–22	4,100	
November 7	at Colgate	Andy Kerr Stadium; Hamilton, NY	L 6–24		
November 14	at Boston University	Memorial Stadium; Lewisburg, PA	L 0–27	3,214	
^{†}Homecoming; ^ Parents Weekend; Rankings from NCAA Division I-AA Football Committee Poll released prior to the game

== Roster ==
1981 Bucknell Bison football team roster
Players
Coaches
Offense

Pos.	#	Name	Class
OT	73	Eric Andersen	Jr
QB	3	Joe Donato	Sr
RB	31	Ken Jenkins	Sr

Defense

Pos.	#	Name	Class
DT	67	Britt Bassett	Sr
LB	80	Ken Durr	Sr
LB	36	Pat Paro	Sr
DE	54	Ed Zack	Sr

Special teams

Pos.	#	Name	Class

Head coach

- Bob Curtis

Coordinators/assistant coaches

Legend

- (C) Team captain
- (S) Suspended
- (I) Ineligible
- Injured
- Redshirt
