= 1981 James Madison Dukes football team =

American college football season

1981 James Madison Dukes football
- Conference: Independent
- Record: 3–8
- Head coach: Challace McMillin (10th season)
- Home stadium: Madison Stadium

1981 NCAA Division I-AA independents football standings
	Conf.			Overall
Team	W	L	T	W		L		T
No. 8 Lafayette		–		9	–	2	–	0
No. 7 Delaware ^		–		9	–	3	–	0
No. 6 Tennessee State ^		–		9	–	3	–	0
Southeastern Louisiana		–		8	–	3	–	0
Lehigh		–		8	–	3	–	0
Nicholls State		–		5	–	5	–	1
Northwestern State		–		4	–	6	–	0
Bucknell		–		4	–	6	–	0
Northeastern		–		3	–	7	–	0
James Madison		–		3	–	8	–	0
^ – NCAA Division I-AA playoff participant; Rankings from NCAA Division I-AA Football Committee poll

The 1981 James Madison Dukes football team was an American football team that represented James Madison University during the 1981 NCAA Division I-AA football season as an independent. In their tenth year under head coach Challace McMillin, the team compiled a 3–8 record.

== Schedule ==
Date	Opponent	Site	Result	Attendance	Source
September 12	at Appalachian State	Conrad Stadium; Boone, NC	L 0–45	9,200	
September 19	Austin Peay	JMU Stadium; Harrisonburg, VA	L 7–13	8,000	
September 26	at Liberty Baptist	City Stadium; Lynchburg, VA	W 36–14		
October 3	at Richmond	City Stadium; Richmond, VA (rivalry)	L 7–24	13,200	
October 10	C. W. Post	JMU Stadium; Harrisonburg, VA	L 36–37		
October 17	Furman	JMU Stadium; Harrisonburg, VA	L 14–30	12,500	
October 24	Hampton	JMU Stadium; Harrisonburg, VA	L 15–17		
October 31	at William & Mary	Cary Field; Williamsburg, VA (rivalry)	L 19–31	7,800	
November 7	Towson State	JMU Stadium; Harrisonburg, VA	W 20–7		
November 15	at No. 9 Shippensburg	Seth Grove Stadium; Shippensburg, PA	L 27–33		
November 21	at East Tennessee State	Memorial Center; Johnson City, TN	W 17–14		
Rankings from NCAA Division II Football Committee Poll released prior to the game

== Roster ==
1981 James Madison Dukes football team roster
Players			Coaches
Offense: Pos. / # / Name / Class; WR / / Gary Clark / So	Defense: Pos. / # / Name / Class	Special teams: Pos. / # / Name / Class; K / / Scott Norwood / Sr	Head coach: Challace McMillin; Coordinators/assistant coaches Legend: (C) Team captain; (S) Suspended; (I) Ineligible; Injured; Redshirt
