= 1981 Texas Southern Tigers football team =

American college football season

1981 Texas Southern Tigers football
- Conference: Southwestern Athletic Conference
- Record: 4–6–1 (2–5 SWAC)
- Head coach: Joe Redmond (1st season)
- Home stadium: Robertson Stadium; Astrodome

1981 Southwestern Athletic Conference football standings
	Conf.					Overall
Team	W		L		T	W		L		T
No. 4 Jackson State $^	5	–	1	–	0	9	–	2	–	1
Grambling State	4	–	1	–	1	6	–	4	–	1
Texas Southern	3	–	2	–	1	4	–	5	–	1
Alcorn State	3	–	3	–	0	5	–	5	–	0
Mississippi Valley State	2	–	4	–	0	4	–	6	–	1
Southern	2	–	4	–	0	3	–	8	–	0
Prairie View A&M	1	–	5	–	0	2	–	8	–	0
$ – Conference champion; ^ – NCAA Division I-AA playoff participant; Rankings from NCAA Division I-AA Football Committee poll

The 1981 Texas Southern Tigers football team represented Texas Southern University as a member of the Southwestern Athletic Conference (SWAC) during the 1981 NCAA Division I-AA football season. Led by first-year head coach Joe Redmond, the Tigers compiled an overall record of 4–6–1, with a mark of 2–5 in conference play, and finished sixth in the SWAC.

== Schedule ==
Date	Opponent	Site	Result	Source
September 5	Southeastern Louisiana*	Robertson Stadium; Houston, TX	L 24–31	
September 12	Bethune–Cookman*	Robertson Stadium; Houston, TX	W 14–6	
September 19	at Southern	BREC Memorial Stadium; Baton Rouge, LA	W 13–7	
September 26	at Tennessee State*	Hale Stadium; Nashville, TN	L 25–48	
October 3	Texas A&I*	Robertson Stadium; Houston, TX	L 13–31	
October 10	Alcorn State	Robertson Stadium; Houston, TX	W 24–17	
October 17	at Nicholls State*	John L. Guidry Stadium; Thibodaux, LA	L 27–31	
October 24	at Mississippi Valley State	Magnolia Stadium; Itta Bena, MS	L 14–21	
October 31	No. 5 Grambling State	Astrodome; Houston, TX (Space City Classic)	T 17–17	
November 7	Jackson State	Robertson Stadium; Houston, TX	L 21–37	
November 21	Prairie View A&M	Robertson Stadium; Houston, TX (rivalry)	W 19–0	
*Non-conference game; Rankings from NCAA Division I-AA Football Committee Poll released prior to the game
