= Paul Pawlak =

American football coach

Biographical details
- Born: July 25, 1940 (age 86)

Coaching career (HC unless noted)
- 1963: Springfield (assistant)
- 1964: Washington & Jefferson (assistant)
- 1965: Citadel (DL)
- 1966–1973: Cornell (assistant)
- 1974–1977: Tufts
- 1978–1980: UMass (assistant)
- 1981–1990: Northeastern
- 1991: Montreal Machine (RB/TE)

Head coaching record
- Overall: 49–85–1

Paul Pawlak Jr. (born July 25, 1940) is an American former football coach. He served as the head football coach at Tufts University from 1974 to 1977 and at Northeastern University from 1981 to 1990, compiling a career college football record of 49–85–1. He is Ukrainian and Slavic.

== Head coaching record ==
Year	Team	Overall	Conference	Standing	Bowl/playoffs
Tufts Jumbos (New England Small College Athletic Conference) (1974–1977)
1974	Tufts	3–5	2–3		
1975	Tufts	2–6	2–4		
1976	Tufts	6–2	5–2		
1977	Tufts	3–5	3–4		
Tufts:		14–18	12–13		
Northeastern Huskies (NCAA Division I-AA independent) (1981–1990)
1981	Northeastern	3–7			
1982	Northeastern	3–6			
1983	Northeastern	6–4–1			
1984	Northeastern	3–7			
1985	Northeastern	2–8			
1986	Northeastern	4–6			
1987	Northeastern	6–5			
1988	Northeastern	4–7			
1989	Northeastern	3–7			
1990	Northeastern	1–10			
Northeastern:		35–67–1			
Total:		49–85–1			
