= Ron Rogerson =

American football player and coach (1943–1987)

Biographical details
- Born: June 27, 1943; Brewer, Maine, U.S.
- Died: August 8, 1987 (aged 44); Wolfeboro, New Hampshire, U.S.

Playing career
- 1963–1965: Maine

Coaching career (HC unless noted)
- 1967–1968: Colorado State (assistant)
- 1969: Lebanon Valley (assistant)
- 1971–1980: Delaware (assistant)
- 1981–1984: Maine
- 1985–1986: Princeton

Head coaching record
- Overall: 26–36–1

Accomplishments and honors

Championships
- 1 Yankee Conference (1982)

Awards
- Yankee Conference Coach of the Year (1982)

Ronald A. Rogerson (June 27, 1943 – August 8, 1987) was an American college football coach. He was the head coach of the Maine Black Bears football team from 1981 to 1984 and the Princeton Tigers football team from 1985 to 1986, compiling a career head coaching record of 26–36–1.

Rogerson played offensive tackle at Maine, where he won the Harold Westerman Award as outstanding football player in 1964, and graduated in 1966. He began his coaching career in 1967, serving as an assistant line coach at Colorado State University while also earning a master's degree in education. He moved on to Lebanon Valley College as coach of both the offensive and defensive lines. He was also intramural director at Lebanon Valley.

At the University of Delaware Rogerson spent 10 years as an assistant, coaching offensive and defensive lines as well as defensive backs. As Maine's head coach, he was named Yankee Conference Coach of the Year in 1982 after his team shared the league title.

Rogerson died August 8, 1987, of an apparent heart attack while jogging in Wolfeboro, New Hampshire, where he was vacationing with his family. He was 44 and about to begin his third season as head coach at Princeton.

== Head coaching record ==
Year	Team	Overall	Conference	Standing	Bowl/playoffs
Maine Black Bears (Yankee Conference) (1981–1984)
1981	Maine	3–7–1	1–4	T–5th	
1982	Maine	7–4	3–2	T–1st	
1983	Maine	4–6	0–5	6th	
1984	Maine	5–6	2–3	4th	
Maine:		19–23–1	6–14		
Princeton Tigers (Ivy League) (1985–1986)
1985	Princeton	5–5	5–2	T–2nd	
1986	Princeton	2–8	2–5	T–6th	
Princeton:		7–13	7–7		
Total:		26–36–1			
National championship Conference title Conference division title or championship game berth
