= 1981 Northwestern State Demons football team =

American college football season

1981 Northwestern State Demons football
- Conference: Independent
- Record: 4–6
- Head coach: A. L. Williams (7th season)
- Home stadium: Harry Turpin Stadium

1981 NCAA Division I-AA independents football standings
	Conf.			Overall
Team	W	L	T	W		L		T
No. 8 Lafayette		–		9	–	2	–	0
No. 7 Delaware ^		–		9	–	3	–	0
No. 6 Tennessee State ^		–		9	–	3	–	0
Southeastern Louisiana		–		8	–	3	–	0
Lehigh		–		8	–	3	–	0
Nicholls State		–		5	–	5	–	1
Northwestern State		–		4	–	6	–	0
Bucknell		–		4	–	6	–	0
Northeastern		–		3	–	7	–	0
James Madison		–		3	–	8	–	0
^ – NCAA Division I-AA playoff participant; Rankings from NCAA Division I-AA Football Committee poll

The 1981 Northwestern State Demons football team was an American football team that represented Northwestern State University as an independent during the 1981 NCAA Division I-AA football season. Led by seventh-year head coach A. L. Williams, the Demons compiled an 4–6 record.

== Schedule ==
Date	Opponent	Site	Result	Attendance	Source
September 5	at Boise State	Bronco Stadium; Boise, ID	L 20–32	20,012	
September 12	Angelo State	Harry Turpin Stadium; Natchitoches, LA	W 59–26	8,000	
September 19	Stephen F. Austin	Harry Turpin Stadium; Natchitoches, LA (rivalry)	W 42–13		
September 26	at Abilene Christian	Shotwell Stadium; Abilene, TX	L 38–41		
October 3	East Texas State	Harry Turpin Stadium; Natchitoches, LA	L 21–28	8,000	
October 10	McNeese State	Harry Turpin Stadium; Natchitoches, LA (rivalry)	L 21–42		
October 24	vs. Louisiana Tech	State Fair Stadium; Shreveport, LA (rivalry)	L 33–37	22,300	
October 31	at Southeastern Louisiana	Strawberry Stadium; Hammond, LA (rivalry)	L 16–21	6,000	
November 7	at Nicholls State	John L. Guidry Stadium; Thibodaux, LA (rivalry)	W 31–17		
November 21	Northeast Louisiana	Harry Turpin Stadium; Natchitoches, LA (rivalry)	W 41–9	6,250	
