= 1981 Northeastern Huskies football team =

American college football season

1981 Northeastern Huskies football
- Conference: Independent
- Record: 3–7
- Head coach: Paul Pawlak (1st season)
- Home stadium: Parsons Field

1981 NCAA Division I-AA independents football standings
	Conf.			Overall
Team	W	L	T	W		L		T
No. 8 Lafayette		–		9	–	2	–	0
No. 7 Delaware ^		–		9	–	3	–	0
No. 6 Tennessee State ^		–		9	–	3	–	0
Southeastern Louisiana		–		8	–	3	–	0
Lehigh		–		8	–	3	–	0
Nicholls State		–		5	–	5	–	1
Northwestern State		–		4	–	6	–	0
Bucknell		–		4	–	6	–	0
Northeastern		–		3	–	7	–	0
James Madison		–		3	–	8	–	0
^ – NCAA Division I-AA playoff participant; Rankings from NCAA Division I-AA Football Committee poll

The 1981 Northeastern Huskies football team was an American football team that represented Northeastern University as an independent during the 1981 NCAA Division I-AA football season. Led by first-year head coach Paul Pawlak, the team compiled a 3–7 record.

== Schedule ==
Date	Opponent	Site	Result	Attendance	Source
September 19	at Connecticut	Memorial Stadium; Storrs, CT	L 3–31	4,950	
September 26	at C. W. Post	Hickox Field; Greenvale, NY	L 10–13		
October 3	Springfield	Parsons Field; Brookline, MA	W 24–7		
October 10	at Rhode Island	Meade Stadium; Kingston, RI	L 0–33	9,842	
October 17	at American International	Miller Field; Springfield, MA	W 17–14		
October 24	No. 3 New Hampshire	Parsons Field; Brookline, MA	L 17–24		
October 31	Maine	Parsons Field; Brookline, MA	L 3–9		
November 7	at Central Connecticut	Arute Field; New Britain, CT	W 21–14		
November 14	No. 8 Lehigh	Parsons Field; Brookline, MA	L 20–23	3,240	
November 21	Boston University	Parsons Field; Brookline, MA	L 0–38	3,030	
Rankings from NCAA Division I-AA Football Committee Poll released prior to the game
