= 1981 Southern Jaguars football team =

American college football season

1981 Southern Jaguars football
- Conference: Southwestern Athletic Conference
- Record: 3–8 (2–4 SWAC)
- Head coach: Otis Washington (1st season)
- Defensive coordinator: Buddy Green (1st season)
- Home stadium: BREC Memorial Stadium

1981 Southwestern Athletic Conference football standings
	Conf.					Overall
Team	W		L		T	W		L		T
No. 4 Jackson State $^	5	–	1	–	0	9	–	2	–	1
Grambling State	4	–	1	–	1	6	–	4	–	1
Texas Southern	3	–	2	–	1	4	–	5	–	1
Alcorn State	3	–	3	–	0	5	–	5	–	0
Mississippi Valley State	2	–	4	–	0	4	–	6	–	1
Southern	2	–	4	–	0	3	–	8	–	0
Prairie View A&M	1	–	5	–	0	2	–	8	–	0
$ – Conference champion; ^ – NCAA Division I-AA playoff participant; Rankings from NCAA Division I-AA Football Committee poll

The 1981 Southern Jaguars football team represented Southern University as a member of the Southwestern Athletic Conference (SWAC) during the 1981 NCAA Division I-AA football season. Led by first-year head coach Otis Washington, the Jaguars compiled an overall record of 3–8, with a conference record of 2–4, and finished tied for fifth in the SWAC.

== Schedule ==
Date	Opponent	Site	Result	Attendance	Source
September 5	Bethune–Cookman*	BREC Memorial Stadium; Baton Rouge, LA	W 3–0	25,000	
September 19	Texas Southern	BREC Memorial Stadium; Baton Rouge, LA	L 7–13		
September 26	vs. Prairie View A&M	Rice Stadium; Houston, TX	W 35–0		
October 3	at Mississippi Valley State	Magnolia Stadium; Itta Bena, MS	L 16–21	9,315	
October 10	at Nicholls State*	John L. Guidry Stadium; Thibodaux, LA	L 14–56		
October 17	at No. 3 Jackson State	Mississippi Veterans Memorial Stadium; Jackson, MS (rivalry)	L 0–41		
October 24	Alcorn State	BREC Memorial Stadium; Baton Rouge, LA	L 0–18		
October 31	Tennessee State*	BREC Memorial Stadium; Baton Rouge, LA	L 18–28		
November 7	Southeastern Louisiana*	BREC Memorial Stadium; Baton Rouge, LA	L 27–28		
November 14	at Florida A&M*	Bragg Memorial Stadium; Tallahassee, FL	L 14–41	18,100	
November 21	vs. Grambling State	Louisiana Superdome; New Orleans, LA (Bayou Classic)	W 51–20	67,000	
*Non-conference game; Rankings from NCAA Division I-AA Football Committee Poll released prior to the game
