= 1981 Mississippi Valley State Delta Devils football team =

American college football season

1981 Mississippi Valley State Delta Devils football
- Conference: Southwestern Athletic Conference
- Record: 4–6–1 (2–4 SWAC)
- Head coach: Archie Cooley (2nd season)
- Home stadium: Magnolia Stadium

1981 Southwestern Athletic Conference football standings
	Conf.					Overall
Team	W		L		T	W		L		T
No. 4 Jackson State $^	5	–	1	–	0	9	–	2	–	1
Grambling State	4	–	1	–	1	6	–	4	–	1
Texas Southern	3	–	2	–	1	4	–	5	–	1
Alcorn State	3	–	3	–	0	5	–	5	–	0
Mississippi Valley State	2	–	4	–	0	4	–	6	–	1
Southern	2	–	4	–	0	3	–	8	–	0
Prairie View A&M	1	–	5	–	0	2	–	8	–	0
$ – Conference champion; ^ – NCAA Division I-AA playoff participant; Rankings from NCAA Division I-AA Football Committee poll

The 1981 Mississippi Valley State Delta Devils football team represented Mississippi Valley State University as a member of the Southwestern Athletic Conference (SWAC) during the 1981 NCAA Division I-AA football season. Led by second-year head coach Archie Cooley, the Delta Devils compiled an overall record of 4–6–1, with a conference record of 2–4, and finished tied for fifth in the SWAC.

== Schedule ==
Date	Opponent	Site	Result	Attendance	Source
September 5	Morris Brown*	Magnolia Stadium; Itta Bena, MS	W 20–14		
September 12	at Alabama A&M*	Milton Frank Stadium; Huntsville, AL	L 13–35		
September 19	Arkansas–Pine Bluff*	Magnolia Stadium; Itta Bena, MS	T 23–23		
September 26	vs. No. 4 Jackson State	Liberty Bowl Memorial Stadium; Memphis, TN	L 0–42		
October 3	Southern	Magnolia Stadium; Itta Bena, MS	W 21–16	9,315	
October 10	at North Carolina A&T*	Aggie Stadium; Greensboro, NC	W 17–7		
October 17	at Grambling State	Grambling Stadium; Grambling, LA	L 0–35		
October 24	Texas Southern	Magnolia Stadium; Itta Bena, MS	W 21–14		
October 31	vs. Prairie View A&M	Houston, TX	L 6–8		
November 7	at Alcorn State	Henderson Stadium; Lorman, MS	L 14–24		
November 14	at Alabama State*	Cramton Bowl; Montgomery, AL	L 0–17		
*Non-conference game; Rankings from NCAA Division I-AA Football Committee Poll released prior to the game
