= 1981 Nicholls State Colonels football team =

American college football season

1981 Nicholls State Colonels football
- Conference: Independent
- Record: 5–5–1
- Head coach: Sonny Jackson (1st season)
- Home stadium: John L. Guidry Stadium

1981 NCAA Division I-AA independents football standings
	Conf.			Overall
Team	W	L	T	W		L		T
No. 8 Lafayette		–		9	–	2	–	0
No. 7 Delaware ^		–		9	–	3	–	0
No. 6 Tennessee State ^		–		9	–	3	–	0
Southeastern Louisiana		–		8	–	3	–	0
Lehigh		–		8	–	3	–	0
Nicholls State		–		5	–	5	–	1
Northwestern State		–		4	–	6	–	0
Bucknell		–		4	–	6	–	0
Northeastern		–		3	–	7	–	0
James Madison		–		3	–	8	–	0
^ – NCAA Division I-AA playoff participant; Rankings from NCAA Division I-AA Football Committee poll

The 1981 Nicholls State Colonels football team represented Nicholls State University as an independent during the 1981 NCAA Division I-AA football season. Led by first-year head coach Sonny Jackson, the Colonels compiled a record of 5–5–1. Nicholls State played home games at John L. Guidry Stadium in Thibodaux, Louisiana.

== Schedule ==
Date	Opponent	Site	Result	Attendance	Source
September 12	Delta State	John L. Guidry Stadium; Thibodaux, LA	W 34–10		
September 19	McNeese State	John L. Guidry Stadium; Thibodaux, LA	L 9–59	7,500	
September 26	at Troy State	Veterans Memorial Stadium; Troy, AL	L 23–26	7,500	
October 3	Merchant Marine	John L. Guidry Stadium; Thibodaux, LA	W 45–3		
October 10	Southern	John L. Guidry Stadium; Thibodaux, LA	W 56–14		
October 17	Texas Southern	John L. Guidry Stadium; Thibodaux, LA	W 31–27		
October 24	at Tennessee State	Dudley Field; Nashville, TN	L 11–49	7,500	
October 31	at Northeast Louisiana	Malone Stadium; Monroe, LA	L 18–55	16,988	
November 7	Northwestern State	John L. Guidry Stadium; Thibodaux, LA (NSU Challenge)	L 17–31		
November 14	at Southeastern Louisiana	Strawberry Stadium; Hammond, LA (River Bell Classic)	W 29–17	6,500	
November 21	Southwest Missouri State	John L. Guidry Stadium; Thibodaux, LA	T 20–20	3,035	
