= 1981 Prairie View A&M Panthers football team =

American college football season

1981 Prairie View A&M Panthers football
- Conference: Southwestern Athletic Conference
- Record: 2–8 (1–5 SWAC)
- Head coach: Cornelius Cooper (2nd season)
- Home stadium: Edward L. Blackshear Field

1981 Southwestern Athletic Conference football standings
	Conf.					Overall
Team	W		L		T	W		L		T
No. 4 Jackson State $^	5	–	1	–	0	9	–	2	–	1
Grambling State	4	–	1	–	1	6	–	4	–	1
Texas Southern	3	–	2	–	1	4	–	5	–	1
Alcorn State	3	–	3	–	0	5	–	5	–	0
Mississippi Valley State	2	–	4	–	0	4	–	6	–	1
Southern	2	–	4	–	0	3	–	8	–	0
Prairie View A&M	1	–	5	–	0	2	–	8	–	0
$ – Conference champion; ^ – NCAA Division I-AA playoff participant; Rankings from NCAA Division I-AA Football Committee poll

The 1981 Prairie View A&M Panthers football team represented Prairie View A&M University as a member of the Southwestern Athletic Conference (SWAC) during the 1981 NCAA Division I-AA football season. Led by second-year head coach Cornelius Cooper, the Panthers compiled an overall record of 2–8, with a conference record of 1–5, and finished seventh in the SWAC.

== Schedule ==
Date	Opponent	Site	Result	Source
September 5	at Southwest Texas State*	Bobcat Stadium; San Marcos, TX	L 0–56	
September 19	Jackson State	Edward L. Blackshear Field; Prairie View, TX	L 0–29	
September 26	vs. Southern	Rice Stadium; Houston, TX	L 0–35	
October 3	at Grambling State	Grambling Stadium; Grambling, LA (rivalry)	L 3–44	
October 10	at Bishop*	Dallas, TX	L 0–40	
October 17	at Texas Lutheran*	Matador Stadium; Seguin, TX	W 25–14	
October 31	vs. Mississippi Valley State	Houston, TX	W 8–6	
November 7	at Arkansas–Pine Bluff*	Pumphrey Stadium; Pine Bluff, AR	L 16–20	
November 14	at Alcorn State	Henderson Stadium; Lorman, MS	L 0–30	
November 21	at Texas Southern	Robertson Stadium; Houston, TX (rivalry)	L 0–19	
*Non-conference game
