= 1981 Boston University Terriers football team =

American college football season

1981 Boston University Terriers football
- Conference: Yankee Conference
- Record: 6–5 (3–2 Yankee)
- Head coach: Rick Taylor (5th season)
- Offensive coordinator: Buddy Teevens (1st season)
- Defensive coordinator: Ed Sweeney (4th season)
- Home stadium: Nickerson Field

1981 Yankee Conference football standings
	Conf.					Overall
Team	W		L		T	W		L		T
Rhode Island +^	4	–	1	–	0	6	–	6	–	0
No. T–10 UMass +	4	–	1	–	0	6	–	3	–	0
Boston University	3	–	2	–	0	6	–	5	–	0
No. T–10 New Hampshire	2	–	3	–	0	7	–	3	–	0
Connecticut	1	–	4	–	0	4	–	7	–	0
Maine	1	–	4	–	0	3	–	7	–	1
+ – Conference co-champions; ^ – NCAA Division I-AA playoff participant; Rankings from NCAA Division I-AA Football Committee poll

The 1981 Boston University Terriers football team was an American football team that represented Boston University as a member of the Yankee Conference during the 1981 NCAA Division I-AA football season. In their fifth season under head coach Rick Taylor, the Terriers compiled a 6–5 record (3–2 against conference opponents), finished third in the conference, and outscored opponents by a total of 263 to 184.

== Schedule ==
Date	Opponent	Site	Result	Attendance	Source
September 5	Merchant Marine*	Nickerson Field; Boston, MA	W 24–13		
September 12	at Holy Cross*	Fitton Field; Worcester, MA	L 6–14	15,663	
September 19	New Hampshire	Nickerson Field; Boston, MA	L 8–10	4,257	
September 26	at Maine	Alumni Field; Orono, ME	W 48–7		
October 3	at Colgate	Andy Kerr Stadium; Hamilton, NY	L 14–21	5,100	
October 10	at Davidson	Richardson Stadium; Davidson, NC	L 14–44	3,000	
October 17	Rhode Island	Nickerson Field; Boston, MA	W 27–21		
October 24	at UMass	Alumni Stadium; Hadley, MA	L 20–34		
November 7	Connecticut	Nickerson Field; Boston, MA	W 37–20		
November 14	Bucknell*	Nickerson Field; Boston, MA	W 27–0	3,214	
November 21	at Northeastern*	Parsons Field; Brookline, MA	W 38–0	3,030	
*Non-conference game
