= 1981 Alcorn State Braves football team =

American college football season

1981 Alcorn State Braves football
- Conference: Southwestern Athletic Conference
- Record: 5–5 (3–3 SWAC)
- Head coach: Marino Casem (18th season)
- Defensive coordinator: Dennis Thomas (3rd season)
- Home stadium: Henderson Stadium

1981 Southwestern Athletic Conference football standings
	Conf.					Overall
Team	W		L		T	W		L		T
No. 4 Jackson State $^	5	–	1	–	0	9	–	2	–	1
Grambling State	4	–	1	–	1	6	–	4	–	1
Texas Southern	3	–	2	–	1	4	–	5	–	1
Alcorn State	3	–	3	–	0	5	–	5	–	0
Mississippi Valley State	2	–	4	–	0	4	–	6	–	1
Southern	2	–	4	–	0	3	–	8	–	0
Prairie View A&M	1	–	5	–	0	2	–	8	–	0
$ – Conference champion; ^ – NCAA Division I-AA playoff participant; Rankings from NCAA Division I-AA Football Committee poll

The 1981 Alcorn State Braves football team represented Alcorn State University as a member of the Southwestern Athletic Conference (SWAC) during the 1981 NCAA Division I-AA football season. Led by 18th-year head coach Marino Casem, the Braves compiled an overall record of 5–5, with a conference record of 3–3, and finished fourth in the SWAC.

== Schedule ==
Date	Opponent	Site	Result	Source
September 5	at Angelo State*	San Angelo Stadium; San Angelo, TX	L 10–16	
September 12	vs. Grambling State	Independence Stadium; Shreveport, LA (Red River Classic)	L 10–13	
September 19	vs. Alabama State*	Ladd Stadium; Mobile, AL (Gulf Coast Classic)	L 7–14	
October 3	No. T–10 South Carolina State*	Henderson Stadium; Lorman, MS	W 24–20	
October 10	at Texas Southern	Robertson Stadium; Houston, TX	L 17–24	
October 24	at Southern	BREC Memorial Stadium; Baton Rouge, LA	W 18–0	
October 31	at Bishop*	Dallas, TX	W 14–13	
November 7	Mississippi Valley State	Henderson Stadium; Lorman, MS	W 24–14	
November 14	Prairie View A&M	Henderson Stadium; Lorman, MS	W 30–0	
November 26	at No. 4 Jackson State	Mississippi Veterans Memorial Stadium; Jackson, MS (rivalry)	L 10–13	
*Non-conference game; Rankings from NCAA Division I-AA Football Committee Poll released prior to the game
