= 1981 Southeastern Louisiana Lions football team =

American college football season

1981 Southeastern Louisiana Lions football
- Conference: Independent
- Record: 8–3
- Head coach: Oscar Lofton (2nd season)
- Home stadium: Strawberry Stadium

1981 NCAA Division I-AA independents football standings
	Conf.			Overall
Team	W	L	T	W		L		T
No. 8 Lafayette		–		9	–	2	–	0
No. 7 Delaware ^		–		9	–	3	–	0
No. 6 Tennessee State ^		–		9	–	3	–	0
Southeastern Louisiana		–		8	–	3	–	0
Lehigh		–		8	–	3	–	0
Nicholls State		–		5	–	5	–	1
Northwestern State		–		4	–	6	–	0
Bucknell		–		4	–	6	–	0
Northeastern		–		3	–	7	–	0
James Madison		–		3	–	8	–	0
^ – NCAA Division I-AA playoff participant; Rankings from NCAA Division I-AA Football Committee poll

The 1981 Southeastern Louisiana Lions football team was an American football team that represented Southeastern Louisiana University as an independent during the 1981 NCAA Division I-AA football season. Led by second-year head coach Oscar Lofton, the Lions compiled an 8–3 record.

== Schedule ==
Date	Opponent	Site	Result	Attendance	Source
September 5	at Texas Southern	Robertson Stadium; Houston, TX	W 31–24		
September 12	at Southwestern Louisiana	Cajun Field; Lafayette, LA (rivalry)	W 7–0	19,522	
September 19	at Southwest Texas State	Bobcat Stadium; San Marcos, TX	L 10–35	10,000	
September 26	at Stephen F. Austin	Lumberjack Stadium; Nacogdoches, TX	W 33–24		
October 3	No. 4 Jackson State	Strawberry Stadium; Hammond, LA	L 14–51	12,000	
October 10	at Troy State	Veterans Memorial Stadium; Troy, AL	W 22–21	6,000	
October 17	Tennessee–Martin^{†}	Strawberry Stadium; Hammond, LA	W 13–10	8,500	
October 24	Northeast Louisiana	Strawberry Stadium; Hammond, LA	W 50–47	8,000	
October 31	Northwestern State	Strawberry Stadium; Hammond, LA (rivalry)	W 21–16	6,000	
November 7	at Southern	BREC Memorial Stadium; Baton Rouge, LA	W 28–27	22,018	
November 14	Nicholls State	Strawberry Stadium; Hammond, LA (rivalry)	L 17–29	6,500	
^{†}Homecoming; Rankings from Associated Press Poll released prior to the game
