= 1981 New Hampshire Wildcats football team =

American college football season

1981 New Hampshire Wildcats football
- Conference: Yankee Conference
- Record: 7–3 (2–3 Yankee)
- Head coach: Bill Bowes (10th season)
- Home stadium: Cowell Stadium

1981 Yankee Conference football standings
	Conf.					Overall
Team	W		L		T	W		L		T
Rhode Island +^	4	–	1	–	0	6	–	6	–	0
No. T–10 UMass +	4	–	1	–	0	6	–	3	–	0
Boston University	3	–	2	–	0	6	–	5	–	0
No. T–10 New Hampshire	2	–	3	–	0	7	–	3	–	0
Connecticut	1	–	4	–	0	4	–	7	–	0
Maine	1	–	4	–	0	3	–	7	–	1
+ – Conference co-champions; ^ – NCAA Division I-AA playoff participant; Rankings from NCAA Division I-AA Football Committee poll

The 1981 New Hampshire Wildcats football team was an American football team that represented the University of New Hampshire as a member of the Yankee Conference during the 1981 NCAA Division I-AA football season. In its tenth year under head coach Bill Bowes, the team compiled a 7–3 record (2–3 against conference opponents) and finished fourth out of six teams in the Yankee Conference.

== Schedule ==
Date	Opponent	Rank	Site	Result	Attendance	Source
September 12	American International*		Cowell Stadium; Durham, NH	W 28–13	8,250	
September 19	at Boston University		Nickerson Field; Boston, MA	W 10–8	4,257	
September 26	Towson State*	No. 9	Cowell Stadium; Durham, NH	W 31–29	4,700	
October 3	at No. 8 Connecticut	No. T–9	Memorial Stadium; Storrs, CT	W 28–24		
October 10	at Maine	No. 5	Alumni Field; Orono, ME (Battle for the Brice–Cowell Musket)	L 16–26		
October 17	No. 5 Lehigh*	No. 10	Cowell Stadium; Durham, NH	W 13–12	17,500	
October 24	at Northeastern*	No. 3	Parsons Field; Brookline, MA	W 24–17		
October 31	at Rhode Island	No. 2	Meade Stadium; Kingston, RI	L 12–14		
November 7	at Lafayette*	No. 6	Fisher Stadium; Easton, PA	W 21–18	5,300	
November 14	UMass	No. 4	Cowell Stadium; Durham, NH (rivalry)	L 9–20		
*Non-conference game; Rankings from NCAA Division I-AA Football Committee Poll released prior to the game
