= 1981 Syracuse Orangemen football team =

American college football season

1981 Syracuse Orangemen football
- Conference: Independent
- Record: 4–6–1
- Head coach: Dick MacPherson (1st season)
- Captains: Ike Bogosian; Joe Morris
- Home stadium: Carrier Dome

1981 Major eastern college football independents records
| | Conf. | | | | | Overall |
| Team | W | | L | | T | W | | L | | T |
|---|---|---|---|---|---|---|---|---|---|---|
| No. 3 Penn State $ | 5 | – | 0 | – | 0 | 10 | – | 2 | – | 0 |
| No. 4 Pittsburgh | 5 | – | 1 | – | 0 | 11 | – | 1 | – | 0 |
| No. 17 West Virginia | 3 | – | 3 | – | 0 | 9 | – | 3 | – | 0 |
| Temple | 2 | – | 3 | – | 0 | 5 | – | 5 | – | 0 |
| Syracuse | 2 | – | 4 | – | 0 | 4 | – | 6 | – | 1 |
| Boston College | 1 | – | 4 | – | 0 | 5 | – | 6 | – | 0 |
| Rutgers | 1 | – | 4 | – | 0 | 5 | – | 6 | – | 0 |
$ – Lambert Trophy Winner; Rankings from AP Poll

1981 NCAA Division I-A independents football records
| | Conf. | | | | | Overall |
| Team | W | | L | | T | W | | L | | T |
|---|---|---|---|---|---|---|---|---|---|---|
| No. 4 Pittsburgh | | – | | – | | 11 | – | 1 | – | 0 |
| No. 3 Penn State | | – | | – | | 10 | – | 2 | – | 0 |
| No. 8 Miami (FL) | | – | | – | | 9 | – | 2 | – | 0 |
| Southern Miss | | – | | – | | 9 | – | 2 | – | 1 |
| No. 17 West Virginia | | – | | – | | 9 | – | 3 | – | 0 |
| Colgate | | – | | – | | 7 | – | 3 | – | 0 |
| Virginia Tech | | – | | – | | 7 | – | 4 | – | 0 |
| Navy | | – | | – | | 7 | – | 4 | – | 1 |
| Cincinnati | | – | | – | | 6 | – | 5 | – | 0 |
| Florida State | | – | | – | | 6 | – | 5 | – | 0 |
| Holy Cross | | – | | – | | 6 | – | 5 | – | 0 |
| Tulane | | – | | – | | 6 | – | 5 | – | 0 |
| UNLV | | – | | – | | 6 | – | 6 | – | 0 |
| South Carolina | | – | | – | | 6 | – | 6 | – | 0 |
| Temple | | – | | – | | 5 | – | 5 | – | 0 |
| Boston College | | – | | – | | 5 | – | 6 | – | 0 |
| East Carolina | | – | | – | | 5 | – | 6 | – | 0 |
| Northeast Louisiana | | – | | – | | 5 | – | 6 | – | 0 |
| Louisville | | – | | – | | 5 | – | 6 | – | 0 |
| Notre Dame | | – | | – | | 5 | – | 6 | – | 0 |
| Rutgers | | – | | – | | 5 | – | 6 | – | 0 |
| William & Mary | | – | | – | | 5 | – | 6 | – | 0 |
| Syracuse | | – | | – | | 4 | – | 6 | – | 1 |
| Richmond | | – | | – | | 4 | – | 7 | – | 0 |
| Army | | – | | – | | 3 | – | 7 | – | 1 |
| North Texas State | | – | | – | | 2 | – | 9 | – | 0 |
| Georgia Tech | | – | | – | | 1 | – | 10 | – | 0 |
| Memphis State | | – | | – | | 1 | – | 10 | – | 0 |
Rankings from AP Poll

The 1981 Syracuse Orangemen football team represented Syracuse University as an independent during the 1981 NCAA Division I-A football season. Led by first-year head coach Dick MacPherson, the Orangemen compiled a record of 4–6–1. Syracuse played home games at the Carrier Dome in Syracuse, New York.

== Schedule ==
| Date | Opponent | Site | Result | Attendance | Source |
|---|---|---|---|---|---|
| September 5 | Rutgers | Carrier Dome; Syracuse, NY | L 27–29 | 38,715 | |
| September 12 | at Temple | Veterans Stadium; Philadelphia, PA | L 19–31 | 15,091 | |
| September 19 | at Illinois | Memorial Stadium; Champaign, IL | L 14–17 | 57,579 | |
| September 26 | Indiana | Carrier Dome; Syracuse, NY | W 21–7 | 32,060 | |
| October 3 | at Maryland | Byrd Stadium; College Park, MD | T 17–17 | 32,000 | |
| October 17 | No. 2 Penn State^{†} | Carrier Dome; Syracuse, NY (rivalry) | L 16–41 | 50,037 | |
| October 24 | at No. 2 Pittsburgh | Pitt Stadium; Pittsburgh, PA (rivalry) | L 10–23 | 50,330 | |
| October 31 | Colgate | Carrier Dome; Syracuse, NY (rivalry) | W 47–24 | 40,309 | |
| November 7 | at Navy | Navy–Marine Corps Memorial Stadium; Annapolis, MD | L 23–35 | 23,355 | |
| November 14 | Boston College | Carrier Dome; Syracuse, NY | W 27–17 | 35,623 | |
| November 21 | West Virginia | Carrier Dome; Syracuse, NY (rivalry) | W 27–24 | 33,117 | |
^{†}Homecoming; Rankings from AP Poll released prior to the game

== Roster ==
1981 Syracuse Orange football team roster
| Players | | | Coaches |
|---|---|---|---|
| Offense: Pos. / # / Name / Class; RB / 47 / Joe Morris / Sr | Defense: Pos. / # / Name / Class | Special teams: Pos. / # / Name / Class; K / 1 / Gary Anderson / Sr | Head coach: Dick MacPherson; Coordinators/assistant coaches Legend: (C) Team captain; (S) Suspended; (I) Ineligible; Injured; Redshirt |
