= 1981 Memphis State Tigers football team =

American college football season

1981 Memphis State Tigers football
- Conference: Independent
- Record: 1–10
- Head coach: Rex Dockery (1st season)
- Home stadium: Liberty Bowl Memorial Stadium

1981 NCAA Division I-A independents football records
	Conf.					Overall
Team	W		L		T	W		L		T
No. 4 Pittsburgh		–		–		11	–	1	–	0
No. 3 Penn State		–		–		10	–	2	–	0
No. 8 Miami (FL)		–		–		9	–	2	–	0
Southern Miss		–		–		9	–	2	–	1
No. 17 West Virginia		–		–		9	–	3	–	0
Colgate		–		–		7	–	3	–	0
Virginia Tech		–		–		7	–	4	–	0
Navy		–		–		7	–	4	–	1
Cincinnati		–		–		6	–	5	–	0
Florida State		–		–		6	–	5	–	0
Holy Cross		–		–		6	–	5	–	0
Tulane		–		–		6	–	5	–	0
UNLV		–		–		6	–	6	–	0
South Carolina		–		–		6	–	6	–	0
Temple		–		–		5	–	5	–	0
Boston College		–		–		5	–	6	–	0
East Carolina		–		–		5	–	6	–	0
Northeast Louisiana		–		–		5	–	6	–	0
Louisville		–		–		5	–	6	–	0
Notre Dame		–		–		5	–	6	–	0
Rutgers		–		–		5	–	6	–	0
William & Mary		–		–		5	–	6	–	0
Syracuse		–		–		4	–	6	–	1
Richmond		–		–		4	–	7	–	0
Army		–		–		3	–	7	–	1
North Texas State		–		–		2	–	9	–	0
Georgia Tech		–		–		1	–	10	–	0
Memphis State		–		–		1	–	10	–	0
Rankings from AP Poll

The 1981 Memphis State Tigers football team represented Memphis State University (now known as the University of Memphis) as an independent during the 1981 NCAA Division I-A football season. In its first season under head coach Rex Dockery, the team compiled a 1–10 record and was outscored by a total of 209 to 82. The team played its home games at Liberty Bowl Memorial Stadium in Memphis, Tennessee.

The team's statistical leaders included Tom Smith with 466 passing yards, Tony Wiley with 497 rushing yards, Jerry Knowlton with 244 receiving yards, and Greg Hauss with 23 points scored.

== Schedule ==
Date	Opponent	Site	Result	Attendance	Source
September 5	at No. 14 Mississippi State	Mississippi Veterans Memorial Stadium; Jackson, MS	L 3–20	42,507	
September 12	at No. 18 Florida State	Doak Campbell Stadium; Tallahassee, FL	L 5–10	51,454	
September 19	Ole Miss	Liberty Bowl Memorial Stadium; Memphis, TN (rivalry)	L 3–7	53,170	
September 26	at Georgia Tech	Grant Field; Atlanta, GA	W 28–15	32,463	
October 3	at Virginia Tech	Lane Stadium; Blacksburg, VA	L 13–17	40,100	
October 10	Louisville	Liberty Bowl Memorial Stadium; Memphis, TN (rivalry)	L 7–14	24,286	
October 17	Southern Miss^{†}	Liberty Bowl Memorial Stadium; Memphis, TN (Black and Blue Bowl)	L 0–10	14,252	
October 24	Tennessee	Liberty Bowl Memorial Stadium; Memphis, TN	L 9–28	51,668	
October 31	at Vanderbilt	Dudley Field; Nashville, TN	L 0–26	33,285	
November 7	at Cincinnati	Nippert Stadium; Cincinnati, OH (rivalry)	L 7–38	10,233	
November 14	Tulane	Liberty Bowl Memorial Stadium; Memphis, TN	L 7–24	14,827	
^{†}Homecoming; Rankings from AP Poll released prior to the game
