= 1981 Lehigh Engineers football team =

American college football season

1981 Lehigh Engineers football
- Conference: Independent
- Record: 8–3
- Head coach: John Whitehead (6th season)
- Captains: Joe Macellara; Larry Michalski
- Home stadium: Taylor Stadium

1981 NCAA Division I-AA independents football standings
	Conf.			Overall
Team	W	L	T	W		L		T
No. 8 Lafayette		–		9	–	2	–	0
No. 7 Delaware ^		–		9	–	3	–	0
No. 6 Tennessee State ^		–		9	–	3	–	0
Southeastern Louisiana		–		8	–	3	–	0
Lehigh		–		8	–	3	–	0
Nicholls State		–		5	–	5	–	1
Northwestern State		–		4	–	6	–	0
Bucknell		–		4	–	6	–	0
Northeastern		–		3	–	7	–	0
James Madison		–		3	–	8	–	0
^ – NCAA Division I-AA playoff participant; Rankings from NCAA Division I-AA Football Committee poll

The 1981 Lehigh Engineers football team was an American football team that represented Lehigh University as an independent during the 1981 NCAA Division I-AA football season.

In their sixth year under head coach John Whitehead, the Engineers compiled an 8–3 record. Joe Macellara and Larry Michalski were the team captains.

Lehigh played its home games at Taylor Stadium on the university's main campus in Bethlehem, Pennsylvania.

== Schedule ==
Date	Opponent	Rank	Site	Result	Attendance	Source
September 12	Maine		Taylor Stadium; Bethlehem, PA	W 24–10	10,000	
September 19	at Colgate		Andy Kerr Stadium; Hamilton, NY	L 14–27	5,800	
September 26	Penn		Taylor Stadium; Bethlehem, PA	W 58–0	11,436	
October 3	at No. 1 Delaware		Delaware Stadium; Newark, DE (rivalry)	W 24–21	22,784	
October 10	Connecticut	No. 6	Taylor Stadium; Bethlehem, PA	W 21–17	11,874	
October 17	at No. 10 New Hampshire	No. 5	Cowell Stadium; Durham, NH	L 12–13	17,500	
October 24	at Bucknell	No. 10	Memorial Stadium; 9Lewisburg, PA	W 18–0	8,800	
October 31	Davidson	No. 9	Taylor Stadium; Bethlehem, PA	W 69–7		
November 7	Millersville	No. 8	Taylor Stadium; Bethlehem, PA	W 40–7	10,000	
November 14	at Northeastern	No. 8	Parsons Field; Brookline, MA	W 23–20	3,240	
November 21	Lafayette	No. 6	Taylor Stadium; Bethlehem, PA (The Rivalry)	L 3–10	19,000	
^ Parents Day; Rankings from NCAA Division I-AA Football Committee Poll released prior to the game
