= 1981 Rhode Island Rams football team =

American college football season

1981 Rhode Island Rams football

Yankee Conference co-champion

NCAA Division I-AA Quarterfinal, L 20–28 vs. Idaho State
- Conference: Yankee Conference
- Record: 6–6 (4–1 Yankee)
- Head coach: Bob Griffin (6th season)
- Offensive coordinator: Niles Nelson (1st season)
- Defensive coordinator: Pete Adrian (6th season)
- Home stadium: Meade Stadium

1981 Yankee Conference football standings
	Conf.					Overall
Team	W		L		T	W		L		T
Rhode Island +^	4	–	1	–	0	6	–	6	–	0
No. T–10 UMass +	4	–	1	–	0	6	–	3	–	0
Boston University	3	–	2	–	0	6	–	5	–	0
No. T–10 New Hampshire	2	–	3	–	0	7	–	3	–	0
Connecticut	1	–	4	–	0	4	–	7	–	0
Maine	1	–	4	–	0	3	–	7	–	1
+ – Conference co-champions; ^ – NCAA Division I-AA playoff participant; Rankings from NCAA Division I-AA Football Committee poll

The 1981 Rhode Island Rams football team represented the University of Rhode Island in the 1981 NCAA Division I-AA football season. They were led by sixth-year head coach Bob Griffin and played their home games at Meade Stadium. They competed as a member of the Yankee Conference.

Finishing conference play with a 4–1 record, the Rams were named Yankee Conference co-champions with UMass. With their win over UMass, the Rams received the automatic bid to the NCAA Division I-AA Playoffs, marking Rhode Island's first ever playoff appearance.

== Schedule ==
Date	Opponent	Rank	Site	Result	Attendance	Source
September 12	at Boise State*		Bronco Stadium; Boise, ID	L 33–8	19,437	
September 19	Maine		Meade Stadium; Kingston, RI	W 21–10		
September 26	Merchant Marine*		Meade Stadium; Kingston, RI	W 23–12		
October 3	at No. 6 UMass		Alumni Stadium; Amherst, MA	W 16–10		
October 10	Northeastern*		Meade Stadium; Kingston, RI	W 33–0	9,842	
October 17	at Boston University		Nickerson Field; Boston, MA	L 21–27		
October 24	at Delaware*		Delaware Stadium; Newark, DE	L 15–35	20,135	
October 31	No. 2 New Hampshire		Meade Stadium; Kingston, RI	W 14–12		
November 7	Brown*	No. 10	Meade Stadium; Kingston, RI (rivalry)	L 8–10	9,737	
November 14	Connecticut		Meade Stadium; Kingston, RI (rivalry)	W 34–29		
November 21	at Florida A&M*		Bragg Memorial Stadium; Tallahassee, FL	L 6–41	3,825	
December 5	at No. 2 Idaho State*		ASISU Minidome; Pocatello, ID (NCAA Division I-AA Quarterfinal)	L 0–51	12,153	
*Non-conference game; Rankings from NCAA Division I-AA Football Committee Poll released prior to the game
