= 1981 Pittsburgh Panthers football team =

American college football season

1981 Pittsburgh Panthers football

National champion (NCF) Sugar Bowl champion

Sugar Bowl, W 24–20 vs. Georgia
- Conference: Independent

Ranking
- Coaches: No. 2
- AP: No. 4
- Record: 11–1
- Head coach: Jackie Sherrill (5th season)
- Offensive coordinator: Joe Moore (1st season)
- Offensive scheme: West Coast
- Defensive coordinator: Foge Fazio (3rd season)
- Base defense: Multiple front
- Home stadium: Pitt Stadium

1981 Major eastern college football independents records
| | Conf. | | | | | Overall |
| Team | W | | L | | T | W | | L | | T |
|---|---|---|---|---|---|---|---|---|---|---|
| No. 3 Penn State $ | 5 | – | 0 | – | 0 | 10 | – | 2 | – | 0 |
| No. 4 Pittsburgh | 5 | – | 1 | – | 0 | 11 | – | 1 | – | 0 |
| No. 17 West Virginia | 3 | – | 3 | – | 0 | 9 | – | 3 | – | 0 |
| Temple | 2 | – | 3 | – | 0 | 5 | – | 5 | – | 0 |
| Syracuse | 2 | – | 4 | – | 0 | 4 | – | 6 | – | 1 |
| Boston College | 1 | – | 4 | – | 0 | 5 | – | 6 | – | 0 |
| Rutgers | 1 | – | 4 | – | 0 | 5 | – | 6 | – | 0 |
$ – Lambert Trophy Winner; Rankings from AP Poll

1981 NCAA Division I-A independents football records
| | Conf. | | | | | Overall |
| Team | W | | L | | T | W | | L | | T |
|---|---|---|---|---|---|---|---|---|---|---|
| No. 4 Pittsburgh | | – | | – | | 11 | – | 1 | – | 0 |
| No. 3 Penn State | | – | | – | | 10 | – | 2 | – | 0 |
| No. 8 Miami (FL) | | – | | – | | 9 | – | 2 | – | 0 |
| Southern Miss | | – | | – | | 9 | – | 2 | – | 1 |
| No. 17 West Virginia | | – | | – | | 9 | – | 3 | – | 0 |
| Colgate | | – | | – | | 7 | – | 3 | – | 0 |
| Virginia Tech | | – | | – | | 7 | – | 4 | – | 0 |
| Navy | | – | | – | | 7 | – | 4 | – | 1 |
| Cincinnati | | – | | – | | 6 | – | 5 | – | 0 |
| Florida State | | – | | – | | 6 | – | 5 | – | 0 |
| Holy Cross | | – | | – | | 6 | – | 5 | – | 0 |
| Tulane | | – | | – | | 6 | – | 5 | – | 0 |
| UNLV | | – | | – | | 6 | – | 6 | – | 0 |
| South Carolina | | – | | – | | 6 | – | 6 | – | 0 |
| Temple | | – | | – | | 5 | – | 5 | – | 0 |
| Boston College | | – | | – | | 5 | – | 6 | – | 0 |
| East Carolina | | – | | – | | 5 | – | 6 | – | 0 |
| Northeast Louisiana | | – | | – | | 5 | – | 6 | – | 0 |
| Louisville | | – | | – | | 5 | – | 6 | – | 0 |
| Notre Dame | | – | | – | | 5 | – | 6 | – | 0 |
| Rutgers | | – | | – | | 5 | – | 6 | – | 0 |
| William & Mary | | – | | – | | 5 | – | 6 | – | 0 |
| Syracuse | | – | | – | | 4 | – | 6 | – | 1 |
| Richmond | | – | | – | | 4 | – | 7 | – | 0 |
| Army | | – | | – | | 3 | – | 7 | – | 1 |
| North Texas State | | – | | – | | 2 | – | 9 | – | 0 |
| Georgia Tech | | – | | – | | 1 | – | 10 | – | 0 |
| Memphis State | | – | | – | | 1 | – | 10 | – | 0 |
Rankings from AP Poll

The 1981 Pittsburgh Panthers football team represented the University of Pittsburgh as an independent during the 1981 NCAA Division I-A football season. The one-loss Panthers were selected as national champion by NCAA-designated major selector National Championship Foundation and also by Montgomery Full Season Championship. The school does not claim a national championship for this season.

== Schedule ==
| Date | Time | Opponent | Rank | Site | TV | Result | Attendance | Source |
|---|---|---|---|---|---|---|---|---|
| September 5 | 1:30 p.m. | Illinois | No. 8 | Pitt Stadium; Pittsburgh, PA | | W 26–6 | 46,022 | |
| September 19 | 1:30 p.m. | Cincinnati | No. 7 | Pitt Stadium; Pittsburgh, PA (River City Rivalry) | | W 38–7 | 40,172 | |
| October 3 | 3:50 p.m. | at South Carolina | No. 4 | Williams–Brice Stadium; Columbia, SC | ABC | W 42–28 | 56,495 | |
| October 10 | 1:30 p.m. | at West Virginia | No. 4 | Mountaineer Field; Morgantown, WV (Backyard Brawl) | | W 17–0 | 54,280 | |
| October 17 | 1:30 p.m. | No. 11 Florida State | No. 3 | Pitt Stadium; Pittsburgh, PA | | W 42–14 | 55,112 | |
| October 24 | 1:30 p.m. | Syracuse^{†} | No. 2 | Pitt Stadium; Pittsburgh, PA (rivalry) | USA | W 23–10 | 50,330 | |
| October 31 | 1:00 p.m. | at Boston College | No. 2 | Alumni Stadium; Chestnut Hill, MA | | W 29–24 | 25,500 | |
| November 7 | 1:00 p.m. | at Rutgers | No. 1 | Giants Stadium; East Rutherford, NJ | | W 47–3 | 34,636 | |
| November 14 | 1:30 p.m. | Army | No. 1 | Pitt Stadium; Pittsburgh, PA | | W 48–0 | 53,225 | |
| November 21 | 1:30 p.m. | at Temple | No. 1 | Veterans Stadium; Philadelphia, PA | USA | W 35–0 | 32,570 | |
| November 28 | 12:25 p.m. | No. 11 Penn State | No. 1 | Pitt Stadium; Pittsburgh, PA (rivalry) | ABC | L 14–48 | 60,260 | |
| January 1, 1982 | 8:00 p.m. | vs. No. 2 Georgia | No. 10 | Louisiana Superdome; New Orleans, LA (Sugar Bowl) | ABC | W 24–20 | 77,224 | |
^{†}Homecoming; Rankings from AP Poll released prior to the game; All times are in Eastern time

== Game summaries ==
=== Illinois ===
Illinois Fighting Illini at No. 8 Pittsburgh Panthers – Game summary

| Quarter | 1 | 2 | 3 | 4 | Total |
|---|---|---|---|---|---|
| Fighting Illini | 0 | 6 | 0 | 0 | 6 |
| No. 9 Panthers | 14 | 0 | 10 | 2 | 26 |

at Pitt Stadium • Pittsburgh, PA

- Date: September 7
- Game time: 1:30 PM EDT
- Game attendance: 46,022

| Statistics | ILL | PITT |
|---|---|---|
| First downs | 18 | 11 |
| Total yards | 250 | 318 |
| Rushes/yards | 33-46 | 44-114 |
| Passing yards | 204 | 204 |
| Passing: Comp–Att–Int | 23-37-0 | 14-33-0 |
| Time of possession | 29:03 | 30:57 |

| Team | Category | Player | Statistics |
|---|---|---|---|
| Illinois | Passing | | |
| Illinois | Rushing | | |
| Illinois | Receiving | | |
| Pittsburgh | Passing | | |
| Pittsburgh | Rushing | | |
| Pittsburgh | Receiving | | |

Scoring summary

| Quarter | Time | Drive | | | Team | Scoring information | Score | |
| Quarter | Time | Plays | Yards | TOP | Team | Scoring information | Illinois | Pittsburgh |
|---|---|---|---|---|---|---|---|---|
| 1 | | | | | Pittsburgh | DiBartola 4-yard touchdown run, Everett kick good | 0 | 7 |
| 1 | | | | | Pittsburgh | Collins 19-yard touchdown reception from Marino, Everett kick good | 0 | 14 |
| 2 | | | | | Illinois | 46-yard field goal by Bass | 3 | 14 |
| 2 | | | | | Illinois | 33-yard field goal by Bass | 6 | 14 |
| 3 | | | | | Pittsburgh | Dawkins 23-yard touchdown reception from Marino, Everett kick good | 6 | 21 |
| 3 | | | | | Pittsburgh | 43-yard field goal by Everett | 6 | 24 |
| 4 | | – | – | – | Pittsburgh | Safety, Eason tackled in end zone by Maas | 6 | 26 |
| "TOP" = time of possession. For other American football terms, see Glossary of American football. | | | | | | | 6 | 26 |

=== Cincinnati ===
Cincinnati Bearcats at No. 7 Pittsburgh Panthers – Game summary

| Quarter | 1 | 2 | 3 | 4 | Total |
|---|---|---|---|---|---|
| Bearcats | 0 | 0 | 0 | 7 | 7 |
| No. 7 Panthers | 21 | 0 | 10 | 7 | 38 |

at Pitt Stadium • Pittsburgh, PA

- Date: September 19
- Game time: 1:30 PM EDT
- Game attendance: 40,172

| Statistics | UC | PITT |
|---|---|---|
| First downs | 5 | 21 |
| Total yards | 50 | 401 |
| Rushes/yards | 43-(-28) | 36-118 |
| Passing yards | 78 | 283 |
| Passing: Comp–Att–Int | 5-14-1 | 23-31-0 |
| Time of possession | 30:47 | 29:13 |

| Team | Category | Player | Statistics |
|---|---|---|---|
| Cincinnati | Passing | | |
| Cincinnati | Rushing | | |
| Cincinnati | Receiving | | |
| Pittsburgh | Passing | | |
| Pittsburgh | Rushing | | |
| Pittsburgh | Receiving | | |

Scoring summary

| Quarter | Time | Drive | | | Team | Scoring information | Score | |
| Quarter | Time | Plays | Yards | TOP | Team | Scoring information | Cincinnati | Pittsburgh |
|---|---|---|---|---|---|---|---|---|
| 1 | | | | | Pittsburgh | Dawkins 16-yard touchdown reception from Marino, Everett kick good | 0 | 7 |
| 1 | | | | | Pittsburgh | Dawkins 19-yard touchdown reception from Marino, Everett kick good | 0 | 14 |
| 1 | | | | | Pittsburgh | Compton 11-yard touchdown reception from Marino, Everett kick good | 0 | 21 |
| 3 | | | | | Pittsburgh | Dawkins 21-yard touchdown reception from Marino, Everett kick good | 0 | 28 |
| 3 | | | | | Pittsburgh | 32-yard field goal by Everett | 0 | 31 |
| 4 | | | | | Pittsburgh | Dawkins 8-yard touchdown reception from Marino, Everett kick good | 0 | 38 |
| 4 | | — | — | — | Cincinnati | Logan recovered blocked punt in end zone, Fogler kick good | 7 | 38 |
| "TOP" = time of possession. For other American football terms, see Glossary of American football. | | | | | | | 7 | 38 |

=== At South Carolina ===
No. 4 Pittsburgh Panthers at South Carolina Gamecocks – Game summary

| Quarter | 1 | 2 | 3 | 4 | Total |
|---|---|---|---|---|---|
| No. 4 Panthers | 14 | 14 | 14 | 0 | 42 |
| Gamecocks | 0 | 0 | 21 | 7 | 28 |

at Williams–Brice Stadium • Columbia, SC

- Date: October 3
- Game time: 3:50 PM EDT
- Game attendance: 56,495
- TV announcers (ABC): Keith Jackson (play-by-play), Frank Broyles (color commentator) and Steve Davis (sideline reporter)

| Statistics | PITT | S CAR |
|---|---|---|
| First downs | 21 | 12 |
| Total yards | 394 | 287 |
| Rushes/yards | 40-48 | 33-52 |
| Passing yards | 346 | 235 |
| Passing: Comp–Att–Int | 24-39-2 | 17-34-2 |
| Time of possession | | |

| Team | Category | Player | Statistics |
|---|---|---|---|
| Pittsburgh | Passing | | |
| Pittsburgh | Rushing | | |
| Pittsburgh | Receiving | | |
| South Carolina | Passing | | |
| South Carolina | Rushing | | |
| South Carolina | Receiving | | |

Scoring summary

| Quarter | Time | Drive | | | Team | Scoring information | Score | |
| Quarter | Time | Plays | Yards | TOP | Team | Scoring information | Pittsburgh | South Carolina |
|---|---|---|---|---|---|---|---|---|
| 1 | | | | | Pittsburgh | Brown 28-yard touchdown reception from Marino, Everett kick good | 7 | 0 |
| 1 | | | | | Pittsburgh | Brown 12-yard touchdown reception from Marino, Everett kick good | 14 | 0 |
| 2 | | | | | Pittsburgh | Dawkins 53-yard touchdown reception from Marino, Everett kick good | 21 | 0 |
| 2 | | | | | Pittsburgh | Compton 6-yard touchdown reception from Marino, Everett kick good | 28 | 0 |
| 3 | | | | | Pittsburgh | Dawkins 30-yard touchdown reception from Marino, Everett kick good | 35 | 0 |
| 3 | | | | | South Carolina | Aubin 24-yard touchdown reception from Beckham, Fleetwood kick good | 35 | 7 |
| 3 | | | | | Pittsburgh | Brown 8-yard touchdown reception from Marino, Everett kick good | 42 | 7 |
| 3 | | | | | South Carolina | Berry 58-yard touchdown run, Fleetwood kick good | 42 | 14 |
| 3 | | | | | South Carolina | Aubin 58-yard touchdown reception from Hillary, Fleetwood kick good | 42 | 21 |
| 4 | | | | | South Carolina | Smith 9-yard touchdown reception from Beckham, Fleetwood kick good | 42 | 28 |
| "TOP" = time of possession. For other American football terms, see Glossary of American football. | | | | | | | 42 | 28 |

=== At West Virginia ===
No. 4 Pittsburgh Panthers at West Virginia Mountaineers – Game summary

| Quarter | 1 | 2 | 3 | 4 | Total |
|---|---|---|---|---|---|
| No. 4 Panthers | 0 | 7 | 10 | 0 | 17 |
| Mountaineers | 0 | 0 | 0 | 0 | 0 |

at Mountaineer Field • Morgantown, WV

- Date: October 10
- Game time: 1:30 PM EDT
- Game attendance: 54,280

| Statistics | PITT | WVU |
|---|---|---|
| First downs | 12 | 7 |
| Total yards | 283 | 138 |
| Rushes/yards | 58-283 | 20-46 |
| Passing yards | 0 | 92 |
| Passing: Comp–Att–Int | 0-6-1 | 16-36-3 |
| Time of possession | | |

| Team | Category | Player | Statistics |
|---|---|---|---|
| Pittsburgh | Passing | | |
| Pittsburgh | Rushing | | |
| Pittsburgh | Receiving | | |
| West Virginia | Passing | | |
| West Virginia | Rushing | | |
| West Virginia | Receiving | | |

Scoring summary

| Quarter | Time | Drive | | | Team | Scoring information | Score | |
| Quarter | Time | Plays | Yards | TOP | Team | Scoring information | Pittsburgh | West Virginia |
|---|---|---|---|---|---|---|---|---|
| 2 | | | | | Pittsburgh | Thomas 43-yard touchdown run, Everett kick good | 7 | 0 |
| 3 | | | | | Pittsburgh | 39-yard field goal by Everett | 10 | 0 |
| 3 | | | | | Pittsburgh | Thomas 2-yard touchdown run, Everett kick good | 17 | 0 |
| "TOP" = time of possession. For other American football terms, see Glossary of American football. | | | | | | | 17 | 0 |

=== #11 Florida State ===
No. 11 Florida State Seminoles at No. 3 Pittsburgh Panthers – Game summary

| Quarter | 1 | 2 | 3 | 4 | Total |
|---|---|---|---|---|---|
| No. 11 Seminoles | 0 | 7 | 7 | 0 | 14 |
| No. 3 Panthers | 7 | 14 | 14 | 7 | 42 |

at Pitt Stadium • Pittsburgh, PA

- Date: October 17
- Game time: 1:30 PM EDT
- Game attendance: 55,112

| Statistics | FSU | PITT |
|---|---|---|
| First downs | 19 | 22 |
| Total yards | 311 | 503 |
| Rushes/yards | 40-76 | 39-252 |
| Passing yards | 235 | 251 |
| Passing: Comp–Att–Int | 17-31-3 | 15-27-2 |
| Time of possession | 33:24 | 26:16 |

| Team | Category | Player | Statistics |
|---|---|---|---|
| Florida State | Passing | | |
| Florida State | Rushing | | |
| Florida State | Receiving | | |
| Pittsburgh | Passing | | |
| Pittsburgh | Rushing | | |
| Pittsburgh | Receiving | | |

Scoring summary

| Quarter | Time | Drive | | | Team | Scoring information | Score | |
| Quarter | Time | Plays | Yards | TOP | Team | Scoring information | Florida State | Pittsburgh |
|---|---|---|---|---|---|---|---|---|
| 1 | | | | | Pittsburgh | DiBartola 22-yard touchdown reception from Marino, Everett kick good | 0 | 7 |
| 2 | | — | — | — | Pittsburgh | Interception returned 22 yards for touchdown by Sunseri, Everett kick good | 0 | 14 |
| 2 | | — | — | — | Pittsburgh | Flynn 83-yard punt return for a touchdown, Everett kick good | 0 | 21 |
| 2 | | | | | Florida State | Whiting 1-yard touchdown run, Rendina kick good | 7 | 21 |
| 3 | | | | | Pittsburgh | Dawkins 86-yard touchdown reception from Marino, Everett kick good | 7 | 28 |
| 3 | | | | | Pittsburgh | Dawkins 16-yard touchdown reception from Marino, Everett kick good | 7 | 35 |
| 3 | | | | | Florida State | Childers 5-yard touchdown reception from Williams, Rendina kick good | 14 | 35 |
| 4 | | | | | Pittsburgh | Thomas 6-yard touchdown run, Everett kick good | 14 | 42 |
| "TOP" = time of possession. For other American football terms, see Glossary of American football. | | | | | | | 14 | 42 |

=== Syracuse ===
Syracuse Orangemen at No. 2 Pittsburgh Panthers – Game summary

| Quarter | 1 | 2 | 3 | 4 | Total |
|---|---|---|---|---|---|
| Orangemen | 10 | 0 | 0 | 0 | 10 |
| No. 2 Panthers | 0 | 17 | 0 | 6 | 23 |

at Pitt Stadium • Pittsburgh, PA

- Date: October 24
- Game time: 1:30 PM EDT
- Game attendance: 50,330
- TV: USA

| Statistics | SYR | PITT |
|---|---|---|
| First downs | 12 | 23 |
| Total yards | 213 | 371 |
| Rushes/yards | 45-191 | 35-89 |
| Passing yards | 22 | 282 |
| Passing: Comp–Att–Int | 2-9-2 | 27-41-3 |
| Time of possession | | |

| Team | Category | Player | Statistics |
|---|---|---|---|
| Syracuse | Passing | | |
| Syracuse | Rushing | | |
| Syracuse | Receiving | | |
| Pittsburgh | Passing | | |
| Pittsburgh | Rushing | | |
| Pittsburgh | Receiving | | |

Scoring summary

| Quarter | Time | Drive | | | Team | Scoring information | Score | |
| Quarter | Time | Plays | Yards | TOP | Team | Scoring information | Syracuse | Pittsburgh |
|---|---|---|---|---|---|---|---|---|
| 1 | | | | | Syracuse | 36-yard field goal by Anderson | 3 | 0 |
| 1 | | | | | Syracuse | Morris 7-yard touchdown run, Anderson kick good | 10 | 0 |
| 2 | | | | | Pittsburgh | 32-yard field goal by Everett | 10 | 3 |
| 2 | | | | | Pittsburgh | Brown 13-yard touchdown reception from Marino, Everett kick good | 10 | 10 |
| 2 | | | | | Pittsburgh | Dawkins 2-yard touchdown reception from Marino, Everett kick good | 10 | 17 |
| 4 | | | | | Pittsburgh | Dawkins 7-yard touchdown reception from Marino, Everett kick no good | 10 | 23 |
| "TOP" = time of possession. For other American football terms, see Glossary of American football. | | | | | | | 10 | 23 |

=== At Boston College ===
No. 2 Pittsburgh Panthers at Boston College Eagles – Game summary

| Quarter | 1 | 2 | 3 | 4 | Total |
|---|---|---|---|---|---|
| No. 2 Panthers | 7 | 13 | 9 | 0 | 29 |
| Eagles | 3 | 7 | 7 | 7 | 24 |

at Alumni Stadium • Chestnut Hill, MA

- Date: October 31
- Game time: 1:00 PM EST
- Game attendance: 25,500

| Statistics | PITT | BC |
|---|---|---|
| First downs | 23 | 22 |
| Total yards | 389 | 388 |
| Rushes/yards | 47-180 | 36-84 |
| Passing yards | 209 | 304 |
| Passing: Comp–Att–Int | 19-33-2 | 23-42-2 |
| Time of possession | | |

| Team | Category | Player | Statistics |
|---|---|---|---|
| Pittsburgh | Passing | | |
| Pittsburgh | Rushing | | |
| Pittsburgh | Receiving | | |
| Boston College | Passing | | |
| Boston College | Rushing | | |
| Boston College | Receiving | | |

Scoring summary

| Quarter | Time | Drive | | | Team | Scoring information | Score | |
| Quarter | Time | Plays | Yards | TOP | Team | Scoring information | Pittsburgh | Boston College |
|---|---|---|---|---|---|---|---|---|
| 1 | | | | | Boston College | 21-yard field goal by Cooper | 0 | 3 |
| 1 | | | | | Pittsburgh | Brown 14-yard touchdown reception from Marino, Everett kick good | 7 | 3 |
| 2 | | | | | Boston College | Benjamin 8-yard touchdown run, Cooper kick good | 7 | 10 |
| 2 | | | | | Pittsburgh | Collins 32-yard touchdown reception from Marino, Everett kick good | 14 | 10 |
| 2 | | | | | Pittsburgh | Thomas 11-yard touchdown run, Everett kick no good | 20 | 10 |
| 3 | | – | – | – | Pittsburgh | Safety, center snap out of end zone | 22 | 10 |
| 3 | | | | | Pittsburgh | Marino 1-yard touchdown run, Everett kick good | 29 | 10 |
| 3 | | | | | Boston College | Rikard 30-yard touchdown reception from Flutie, Cooper kick good | 29 | 17 |
| 4 | | | | | Boston College | Rikard 17-yard touchdown reception from Flutie, Cooper kick good | 29 | 24 |
| "TOP" = time of possession. For other American football terms, see Glossary of American football. | | | | | | | 29 | 24 |

=== At Rutgers ===
No. 1 Pittsburgh Panthers at Rutgers Scarlet Knights – Game summary

| Quarter | 1 | 2 | 3 | 4 | Total |
|---|---|---|---|---|---|
| No. 1 Panthers | 0 | 14 | 14 | 19 | 47 |
| Scarlet Knights | 3 | 0 | 0 | 0 | 3 |

at Giants Stadium • East Rutherford, NJ

- Date: November 7
- Game time: 1:00 PM EST
- Game attendance: 34,636

| Statistics | PITT | RUT |
|---|---|---|
| First downs | 36 | 7 |
| Total yards | 490 | 86 |
| Rushes/yards | 235 | -70 |
| Passing yards | 255 | 156 |
| Passing: Comp–Att–Int | | |
| Time of possession | | |

| Team | Category | Player | Statistics |
|---|---|---|---|
| Pittsburgh | Passing | | |
| Pittsburgh | Rushing | | |
| Pittsburgh | Receiving | | |
| Rutgers | Passing | | |
| Rutgers | Rushing | | |
| Rutgers | Receiving | | |

Scoring summary

| Quarter | Time | Drive | | | Team | Scoring information | Score | |
| Quarter | Time | Plays | Yards | TOP | Team | Scoring information | Pittsburgh | Rutgers |
|---|---|---|---|---|---|---|---|---|
| 1 | | | | | Rutgers | 26-yard field goal by Falcinelli | 0 | 3 |
| 2 | | | | | Pittsburgh | DiBartola 6-yard touchdown reception from Marino, Everett kick good | 7 | 3 |
| 2 | | | | | Pittsburgh | Brown 31-yard touchdown reception from Marino, Everett kick good | 14 | 3 |
| 3 | | | | | Pittsburgh | Thomas 5-yard touchdown run, Everett kick good | 21 | 3 |
| 3 | | | | | Pittsburgh | Marino 1-yard touchdown run, Everett kick good | 28 | 3 |
| 4 | | | | | Pittsburgh | DiBartola 2-yard touchdown run, Everett kick good | 35 | 3 |
| 4 | | | | | Pittsburgh | Compton 30-yard touchdown reception from Marino, Everett kick no good | 41 | 3 |
| 4 | | | | | Pittsburgh | McIntyre 8-yard touchdown run, Everett kick no good | 47 | 3 |
| "TOP" = time of possession. For other American football terms, see Glossary of American football. | | | | | | | 47 | 3 |

=== Army ===
Army Cadets at No. 1 Pittsburgh Panthers – Game summary

| Quarter | 1 | 2 | 3 | 4 | Total |
|---|---|---|---|---|---|
| Cadets | 0 | 0 | 0 | 0 | 0 |
| No. 1 Panthers | 14 | 7 | 20 | 7 | 48 |

at Pitt Stadium • Pittsburgh, PA

- Date: November 14
- Game time: 1:30 PM EST
- Game attendance: 53,225

| Statistics | ARMY | PITT |
|---|---|---|
| First downs | 11 | 34 |
| Total yards | 174 | 566 |
| Rushes/yards | 36-64 | 47-290 |
| Passing yards | 110 | 276 |
| Passing: Comp–Att–Int | 12-23-0 | 20-32-1 |
| Time of possession | 28:55 | 31:05 |

| Team | Category | Player | Statistics |
|---|---|---|---|
| Army | Passing | | |
| Army | Rushing | | |
| Army | Receiving | | |
| Pittsburgh | Passing | | |
| Pittsburgh | Rushing | | |
| Pittsburgh | Receiving | | |

Scoring summary

| Quarter | Time | Drive | | | Team | Scoring information | Score | |
| Quarter | Time | Plays | Yards | TOP | Team | Scoring information | Army | Pittsburgh |
|---|---|---|---|---|---|---|---|---|
| 1 | | | | | Pittsburgh | Thomas 2-yard touchdown run, Everett kick good | 0 | 7 |
| 1 | | | | | Pittsburgh | DiBartola 1-yard touchdown run, Everett kick good | 0 | 14 |
| 2 | | | | | Pittsburgh | Dawkins 13-yard touchdown reception from Marino, Everett kick good | 0 | 21 |
| 3 | | | | | Pittsburgh | Dawkins 14-yard touchdown reception from Marino, Everett kick good | 0 | 28 |
| 3 | | | | | Pittsburgh | Dawkins 6-yard touchdown reception from Marino, Everett kick no good | 0 | 34 |
| 3 | | | | | Pittsburgh | Dawkins 10-yard touchdown reception from Marino, Everett kick good | 0 | 41 |
| 4 | | | | | Pittsburgh | Bailey 1-yard touchdown run, Everett kick good | 0 | 48 |
| "TOP" = time of possession. For other American football terms, see Glossary of American football. | | | | | | | 0 | 48 |

=== At Temple ===
No. 1 Pittsburgh Panthers at Temple Owls – Game summary

| Quarter | 1 | 2 | 3 | 4 | Total |
|---|---|---|---|---|---|
| No. 1 Panthers | 21 | 0 | 7 | 7 | 35 |
| Owls | 0 | 0 | 0 | 0 | 0 |

at Veterans Stadium • Philadelphia, PA

- Date: November 21
- Game time: 1:30 PM EST
- Game attendance: 32,570
- TV: USA

| Statistics | PITT | TU |
|---|---|---|
| First downs | 22 | 11 |
| Total yards | 388 | 142 |
| Rushes/yards | 44-139 | 36-53 |
| Passing yards | 249 | 89 |
| Passing: Comp–Att–Int | 20-34-4 | 14-26-2 |
| Time of possession | 28:27 | 31:33 |

| Team | Category | Player | Statistics |
|---|---|---|---|
| Pittsburgh | Passing | | |
| Pittsburgh | Rushing | | |
| Pittsburgh | Receiving | | |
| Temple | Passing | | |
| Temple | Rushing | | |
| Temple | Receiving | | |

Scoring summary

| Quarter | Time | Drive | | | Team | Scoring information | Score | |
| Quarter | Time | Plays | Yards | TOP | Team | Scoring information | Pittsburgh | Temple |
|---|---|---|---|---|---|---|---|---|
| 1 | | | | | Pittsburgh | Compton 6-yard touchdown reception from Marino, Everett kick good | 7 | 0 |
| 1 | | | | | Pittsburgh | Compton 55-yard touchdown reception from Marino, Everett kick good | 14 | 0 |
| 1 | | | | | Pittsburgh | Thomas 19-yard touchdown run, Everett kick good | 21 | 0 |
| 3 | | | | | Pittsburgh | Dawkins 12-yard touchdown reception from Marino, Everett kick good | 28 | 0 |
| 4 | | | | | Pittsburgh | Williams 5-yard touchdown reception from Marino, Everett kick good | 35 | 0 |
| "TOP" = time of possession. For other American football terms, see Glossary of American football. | | | | | | | 35 | 0 |

=== #11 Penn State ===
No. 11 Penn State Nittany Lions at No. 1 Pittsburgh Panthers – Game summary

| Quarter | 1 | 2 | 3 | 4 | Total |
|---|---|---|---|---|---|
| No. 11 Nittany Lions | 0 | 14 | 17 | 17 | 48 |
| No. 1 Panthers | 14 | 0 | 0 | 0 | 14 |

at Pitt Stadium • Pittsburgh, PA

- Date: November 28
- Game time: 12:25 PM EST
- Game attendance: 60,260
- TV announcers (ABC): Bill Flemming (play-by-play) and Darrell Royal (color commentator)

| Statistics | PSU | PITT |
|---|---|---|
| First downs | 17 | 20 |
| Total yards | 434 | 393 |
| Rushes/yards | 45-172 | 37-126 |
| Passing yards | 262 | 267 |
| Passing: Comp–Att–Int | 12-23-1 | 22-45-4 |
| Time of possession | 31:15 | 29:45 |

| Team | Category | Player | Statistics |
|---|---|---|---|
| Penn State | Passing | | |
| Penn State | Rushing | | |
| Penn State | Receiving | | |
| Pittsburgh | Passing | | |
| Pittsburgh | Rushing | | |
| Pittsburgh | Receiving | | |

Scoring summary

| Quarter | Time | Drive | | | Team | Scoring information | Score | |
| Quarter | Time | Plays | Yards | TOP | Team | Scoring information | Penn State | Pittsburgh |
|---|---|---|---|---|---|---|---|---|
| 1 | | | | | Pittsburgh | Collins 28-yard touchdown reception from Marino, Everett kick good | 0 | 7 |
| 1 | | | | | Pittsburgh | Collins 9-yard touchdown reception from Marino, Everett kick good | 0 | 14 |
| 2 | | | | | Penn State | Meade 2-yard touchdown run, Franco kick good | 7 | 14 |
| 2 | | | | | Penn State | Blackledge 8-yard touchdown run, Franco kick good | 14 | 14 |
| 3 | | | | | Penn State | Jackson 42-yard touchdown reception from Blackledge, Franco kick good | 21 | 14 |
| 3 | | | | | Penn State | Jackson 45-yard touchdown reception from Blackledge, Franco kick good | 28 | 14 |
| 3 | | | | | Penn State | 39-yard field goal by Franco | 31 | 14 |
| 4 | | | | | Penn State | 38-yard field goal by Franco | 34 | 14 |
| 4 | | — | — | — | Penn State | Fumble recovery returned 0 yards for touchdown by Farrell, Franco kick good | 41 | 14 |
| 4 | | — | — | — | Penn State | Interception returned 91 yards for touchdown by Robinson, Franco kick good | 48 | 14 |
| "TOP" = time of possession. For other American football terms, see Glossary of American football. | | | | | | | 48 | 14 |

=== Vs. #2 Georgia (Sugar Bowl) ===
1982 Sugar Bowl: No. 10 Pittsburgh Panthers vs. No. 2 Georgia Bulldogs – Game summary

| Quarter | 1 | 2 | 3 | 4 | Total |
|---|---|---|---|---|---|
| No. 10 Panthers | 0 | 3 | 7 | 14 | 24 |
| No. 2 Bulldogs | 0 | 7 | 6 | 7 | 20 |

at Louisiana Superdome • New Orleans, LA

- Date: January 1
- Game time: 8:00 PM EST
- Game attendance: 77,224
- Referee: Ken Faulkner (SWC)
- TV announcers (ABC): Keith Jackson (play-by-play), Frank Broyles (color commentator) and Bill Flemming (sideline reporter)

| Statistics | PITT | UGA |
|---|---|---|
| First downs | 27 | 11 |
| Total yards | 469 | 224 |
| Rushes/yards | 44-208 | 36-141 |
| Passing yards | 261 | 83 |
| Passing: Comp–Att–Int | 26-41-2 | 8-15-2 |
| Time of possession | 36:26 | 23:34 |

| Team | Category | Player | Statistics |
|---|---|---|---|
| Pittsburgh | Passing | | |
| Pittsburgh | Rushing | | |
| Pittsburgh | Receiving | | |
| Georgia | Passing | | |
| Georgia | Rushing | | |
| Georgia | Receiving | | |

Scoring summary

| Quarter | Time | Drive | | | Team | Scoring information | Score | |
| Quarter | Time | Plays | Yards | TOP | Team | Scoring information | Pittsburgh | Georgia |
|---|---|---|---|---|---|---|---|---|
| 2 | | | | | Georgia | Walker 10-yard touchdown run, Butler kick good | 0 | 7 |
| 2 | | | | | Pittsburgh | 41-yard field goal by Everett | 3 | 7 |
| 3 | | | | | Pittsburgh | Dawkins 30-yard touchdown reception from Marino, Everett kick good | 10 | 7 |
| 3 | | | | | Georgia | Walker 8-yard touchdown run, Butler kick no good | 10 | 13 |
| 4 | | | | | Pittsburgh | Brown 6-yard touchdown reception from Marino, Everett kick good | 17 | 13 |
| 4 | | | | | Georgia | Kay 6-yard touchdown reception from Belue, Butler kick good | 17 | 20 |
| 4 | | | | | Pittsburgh | Brown 33-yard touchdown reception from Marino, Everett kick good | 24 | 20 |
| "TOP" = time of possession. For other American football terms, see Glossary of American football. | | | | | | | 24 | 20 |

== Personnel ==
=== Coaching staff ===
1981 Pittsburgh Panthers football staff
| Coaching staff: Jackie Sherrill – Head coach; Foge Fazio – Assistant head coach/defensive coordinator/linebackers; Joe Moore – Offensive coordinator/offensive line; Joe Daniels – Quarterbacks; Bob Davie – Drop Backs; Joe Naunchik – Receivers; George Pugh – Tight ends; Andy Urbanic – Running backs; Ray Zingler – Rush Ends | Support staff: Alex Kramer – Administrative assistant; Kevin Dickey – Recruiting doordinator; Anthony Folino – Part-Time Assistant–Defensive Backs; Bob Matey – Part-Time Assistant–Defensive Line; Jim Miceli – Part-Time Assistant–Defensive Line; Michael Sherman – Part-Time Assistant–Offensive Line; Steve Heintzelman – Volunteer coach | Strength and conditioning staff: Buddy Morris – Weight training coordinator |

=== Roster ===
1981 Pittsburgh Panthers football team roster
Players
Coaches
Offense

| Pos. | # | Name | Class |
|---|---|---|---|
| G | 70 | Emil Boures | Sr |
| OT | 75 | Jimbo Covert | Jr |
| QB | 13 | Dan Marino | Jr |
| G | 77 | Ron Sams | Jr |

Defense

| Pos. | # | Name | Class |
|---|---|---|---|
| DB | 5 | Tom Flynn | So |
| DB | 26 | Tim Lewis | Jr |
| DT | 71 | Bill Maas | So |

Special teams

| Pos. | # | Name | Class |

Head coach

- Jackie Sherrill

Coordinators/assistant coaches

Legend

- (C) Team captain
- (S) Suspended
- (I) Ineligible
- Injured
- Redshirt

== Awards and honors ==
- Dan Marino, fourth in Heisman Trophy voting

== Team players drafted into the NFL ==
| Player | Position | Round | Pick | NFL club |
| Emil Boures | Center | 7 | 182 | Pittsburgh Steelers |
| Sal Sunseri | Linebacker | 10 | 267 | Pittsburgh Steelers |
| Sam Clancy | Defensive end | 11 | 284 | Seattle Seahawks |

== Media ==
=== Radio ===
| Flagship station | Play-by-play | Color commentator | Sideline reporter | Studio host |
|---|---|---|---|---|
| WTAE–AM 1250 | Bill Hillgrove | John Sauer | | |
