= 1981 Grambling State Tigers football team =

American college football season

1981 Grambling State Tigers football
- Conference: Southwestern Athletic Conference
- Record: 6–4–1 (4–1–1 SWAC)
- Head coach: Eddie Robinson (39th season)
- Home stadium: Grambling Stadium

1981 Southwestern Athletic Conference football standings
| | Conf. | | | | | Overall |
| Team | W | | L | | T | W | | L | | T |
|---|---|---|---|---|---|---|---|---|---|---|
| No. 4 Jackson State $^ | 5 | – | 1 | – | 0 | 9 | – | 2 | – | 1 |
| Grambling State | 4 | – | 1 | – | 1 | 6 | – | 4 | – | 1 |
| Texas Southern | 3 | – | 2 | – | 1 | 4 | – | 5 | – | 1 |
| Alcorn State | 3 | – | 3 | – | 0 | 5 | – | 5 | – | 0 |
| Mississippi Valley State | 2 | – | 4 | – | 0 | 4 | – | 6 | – | 1 |
| Southern | 2 | – | 4 | – | 0 | 3 | – | 8 | – | 0 |
| Prairie View A&M | 1 | – | 5 | – | 0 | 2 | – | 8 | – | 0 |
$ – Conference champion; ^ – NCAA Division I-AA playoff participant; Rankings from NCAA Division I-AA Football Committee poll

The 1981 Grambling State Tigers football team represented Grambling State University as a member of the Southwestern Athletic Conference (SWAC) during the 1981 NCAA Division I-AA football season. Led by 39th-year head coach Eddie Robinson, the Tigers compiled an overall record of 6–4–1 and a mark of 4–1–1 in conference play, and finished second in the SWAC.

== Schedule ==
| Date | Opponent | Rank | Site | Result | Attendance | Source |
|---|---|---|---|---|---|---|
| September 5 | vs. Florida A&M* | | Yankee Stadium; Bronx, NY | W 21–10 | 40,661 | |
| September 12 | vs. Alcorn State | | Independence Stadium; Shreveport, LA (Red River Classic) | W 13–10 | | |
| September 19 | at SMU* | | Texas Stadium; Irving, TX | L 27–59 | 45,700 | |
| October 3 | Prairie View A&M | | Grambling Stadium; Grambling, LA (rivalry) | W 44–3 | | |
| October 10 | at Tennessee State* | | Dudley Field; Nashville, TN | L 10–14 | 34,386 | |
| October 17 | Mississippi Valley State | | Grambling Stadium; Grambling, LA | W 35–0 | | |
| October 24 | at No. T–1 Jackson State | | Mississippi Veterans Memorial Stadium; Jackson, MS | W 15–7 | 35,467 | |
| October 31 | at Texas Southern | No. 5 | Houston Astrodome; Houston, TX (Space City Classic) | T 17–17 | | |
| November 7 | Alabama State* | No. T–10 | Grambling Stadium; Grambling, LA | W 19–7 | | |
| November 14 | at No. 3 South Carolina State* | No. T–10 | State College Stadium; Orangeburg, SC | L 14–30 | | |
| November 21 | vs. Southern | | Louisiana Superdome; New Orleans, LA (Bayou Classic) | L 20–50 | 67,000 | |
*Non-conference game; Rankings from NCAA Division I-AA Football Committee Poll released prior to the game
