= 1981 Tennessee State Tigers football team =

American college football season

1981 Tennessee State Tigers football

NCAA Division I-AA Quarterfinal, L 25–26 vs. South Carolina State
- Conference: Independent
- Record: 9–3
- Head coach: John Merritt (19th season)
- Home stadium: Hale Stadium; Dudley Field

1981 NCAA Division I-AA independents football standings
	Conf.			Overall
Team	W	L	T	W		L		T
No. 8 Lafayette		–		9	–	2	–	0
No. 7 Delaware ^		–		9	–	3	–	0
No. 6 Tennessee State ^		–		9	–	3	–	0
Southeastern Louisiana		–		8	–	3	–	0
Lehigh		–		8	–	3	–	0
Nicholls State		–		5	–	5	–	1
Northwestern State		–		4	–	6	–	0
Bucknell		–		4	–	6	–	0
Northeastern		–		3	–	7	–	0
James Madison		–		3	–	8	–	0
^ – NCAA Division I-AA playoff participant; Rankings from NCAA Division I-AA Football Committee poll

The 1981 Tennessee State Tigers football team were an American college football team. They represented Tennessee State University as an independent during the 1981 NCAA Division I-AA football season. Led by 19th-year head coach John Merritt, the Tigers compiled a record of 9–3 and were defeated by South Carolina State in the NCAA Division I-AA Quarterfinal.

== Schedule ==
Date	Opponent	Rank	Site	Result	Attendance	Source
September 12	at Jackson State		Mississippi Veterans Memorial Stadium; Jackson, MS	L 23–31		
September 19	at Southern Illinois		McAndrew Stadium; Carbondale, IL	W 17–14	12,500	
September 26	Texas Southern		Hale Stadium; Nashville, TN	W 48–25		
October 3	vs. Alabama State		Legion Field; Birmingham, AL	W 21–20		
October 10	Grambling State		Dudley Field; Nashville, TN	W 14–10	34,386	
October 17	at Louisville		Fairgrounds Stadium; Louisville, KY	W 42–30	28,136	
October 24	Nicholls State		Dudley Field; Nashville, TN	W 49–11	7,500	
October 31	at Southern	No. T–7	BREC Memorial Stadium; Baton Rouge, LA	W 28–18		
November 7	Central State (OH)	No. 5	Hale Stadium; Nashville, TN	W 43–0	6,000	
November 14	at Chattanooga	No. 5	Chamberlain Field; Chattanooga, TN	L 9–28	12,003	
November 21	at North Carolina A&T	No. 7	Aggie Stadium; Greensboro, NC	W 27–18		
December 5	at No. 3 South Carolina State	No. 6	State College Stadium; Orangeburg, SC (NCAA Division I-AA Quarterfinal)	L 25–26 ^{OT}	12,000	
Rankings from NCAA Division I-AA Football Committee Poll released prior to the game
