= 1981 Jackson State Tigers football team =

American college football season

1981 Jackson State Tigers football

SWAC champion

NCAA Division I-AA First Round, L 7–19 at Boise State
- Conference: Southwestern Athletic Conference
- Record: 9–2–1 (5–1 SWAC)
- Head coach: W. C. Gorden (6th season)
- Home stadium: Mississippi Veterans Memorial Stadium

1981 Southwestern Athletic Conference football standings
| | Conf. | | | | | Overall |
| Team | W | | L | | T | W | | L | | T |
|---|---|---|---|---|---|---|---|---|---|---|
| No. 4 Jackson State $^ | 5 | – | 1 | – | 0 | 9 | – | 2 | – | 1 |
| Grambling State | 4 | – | 1 | – | 1 | 6 | – | 4 | – | 1 |
| Texas Southern | 3 | – | 2 | – | 1 | 4 | – | 5 | – | 1 |
| Alcorn State | 3 | – | 3 | – | 0 | 5 | – | 5 | – | 0 |
| Mississippi Valley State | 2 | – | 4 | – | 0 | 4 | – | 6 | – | 1 |
| Southern | 2 | – | 4 | – | 0 | 3 | – | 8 | – | 0 |
| Prairie View A&M | 1 | – | 5 | – | 0 | 2 | – | 8 | – | 0 |
$ – Conference champion; ^ – NCAA Division I-AA playoff participant; Rankings from NCAA Division I-AA Football Committee poll

The 1981 Jackson State Tigers football team represented Jackson State University as a member of the Southwestern Athletic Conference (SWAC) during the 1981 NCAA Division I-AA football season. Led by sixth-year head coach W. C. Gorden, the Tigers compiled and overall record of 9–2–1 with a mark of 5–1 in conference play, winning the SWAC title. Jackson State advanced to the NCAA Division I-AA Championship playoffs, where they lost to Boise State in the quarterfinals.

== Schedule ==
| Date | Opponent | Rank | Site | Result | Attendance | Source |
|---|---|---|---|---|---|---|
| September 5 | Alabama State* | | Mississippi Veterans Memorial Stadium; Jackson, MS | T 14–14 | | |
| September 12 | Tennessee State* | | Mississippi Veterans Memorial Stadium; Jackson, MS | W 31–23 | | |
| September 19 | at Prairie View A&M | | Edward L. Blackshear Field; Prairie View, TX | W 29–0 | | |
| September 26 | vs. Mississippi Valley State | No. 4 | Liberty Bowl Memorial Stadium; Memphis, TN | W 42–0 | | |
| October 3 | at Southeastern Louisiana* | No. 4 | Strawberry Stadium; Hammond, LA | W 51–14 | | |
| October 10 | at Florida A&M* | No. 3 | Bragg Memorial Stadium; Tallahassee, FL | W 14–6 | | |
| October 17 | Southern | No. 3 | Mississippi Veterans Memorial Stadium; Jackson, MS (rivalry) | W 41–0 | | |
| October 24 | Grambling State | No. T–1 | Mississippi Veterans Memorial Stadium; Jackson, MS | L 7–15 | 35,467 | |
| November 7 | at Texas Southern | No. T–7 | Robertson Stadium; Houston, TX | W 37–21 | | |
| November 14 | Kentucky State* | No. 7 | Mississippi Veterans Memorial Stadium; Jackson, MS | W 34–0 | | |
| November 26 | Alcorn State | No. 4 | Mississippi Veterans Memorial Stadium; Jackson, MS (rivalry) | W 13–10 | | |
| December 5 | No. 5 Boise State* | No. 4 | Mississippi Veterans Memorial Stadium; Jackson, MS (NCAA Division I-AA Quarterfinal) | L 7–19 | 11,500 | |
*Non-conference game; Rankings from AP Poll released prior to the game
