= 1981 UMass Minutemen football team =

American college football season

1981 UMass Minutemen football

Yankee Conference co-champion
- Conference: Yankee Conference
- Record: 6–3 (4–1 Yankee)
- Head coach: Bob Pickett (4th season)
- Defensive coordinator: Jim Reid (4th season)
- Home stadium: Alumni Stadium

1981 Yankee Conference football standings
	Conf.					Overall
Team	W		L		T	W		L		T
Rhode Island +^	4	–	1	–	0	6	–	6	–	0
No. T–10 UMass +	4	–	1	–	0	6	–	3	–	0
Boston University	3	–	2	–	0	6	–	5	–	0
No. T–10 New Hampshire	2	–	3	–	0	7	–	3	–	0
Connecticut	1	–	4	–	0	4	–	7	–	0
Maine	1	–	4	–	0	3	–	7	–	1
+ – Conference co-champions; ^ – NCAA Division I-AA playoff participant; Rankings from NCAA Division I-AA Football Committee poll

The 1981 UMass Minutemen football team represented the University of Massachusetts Amherst in the 1981 NCAA Division I-AA football season as a member of the Yankee Conference. The team was coached by Bob Pickett and played its home games at Alumni Stadium in Hadley, Massachusetts. The 1981 season saw the Minutemen win their thirteenth Yankee Conference title. UMass finished the season with a record of 6–3 overall and 4–1 in conference play.

== Schedule ==
Date	Opponent	Rank	Site	Result	Attendance	Source
September 19	Holy Cross*		Alumni Stadium; Hadley, MA	W 13–10	9,960	
September 26	Dartmouth*		Alumni Stadium; Hadley, MA	W 10–8	11,855	
October 3	Rhode Island	No. 6	Alumni Stadium; Hadley, MA	L 10–16		
October 10	at No. T–7 Delaware*		Delaware Stadium; Newark, DE	L 15–38	19,581	
October 17	Maine		Alumni Stadium; Hadley, MA	W 20–7		
October 24	Boston University		Alumni Stadium; Hadley, MA	W 34–20		
October 31	at Connecticut		Memorial Stadium; Storrs, CT (rivalry)	W 29–24	15,980	
November 7	at Boston College*		Alumni Stadium; Chestnut Hill, MA (rivalry)	L 22–52	20,400	
November 14	at No. 4 New Hampshire		Cowell Stadium; Durham, NH (rivalry)	W 20–9		
*Non-conference game; Rankings from NCAA Division I-AA Football Committee Poll released prior to the game
