= 1981 Colgate Red Raiders football team =

American college football season

1981 Colgate Red Raiders football
- Conference: Independent
- Record: 7–3
- Head coach: Frederick Dunlap (6th season)
- Captains: Karl Grabowski; Tom McChesney
- Home stadium: Andy Kerr Stadium

1981 NCAA Division I-A independents football records
	Conf.					Overall
Team	W		L		T	W		L		T
No. 4 Pittsburgh		–		–		11	–	1	–	0
No. 3 Penn State		–		–		10	–	2	–	0
No. 8 Miami (FL)		–		–		9	–	2	–	0
Southern Miss		–		–		9	–	2	–	1
No. 17 West Virginia		–		–		9	–	3	–	0
Colgate		–		–		7	–	3	–	0
Virginia Tech		–		–		7	–	4	–	0
Navy		–		–		7	–	4	–	1
Cincinnati		–		–		6	–	5	–	0
Florida State		–		–		6	–	5	–	0
Holy Cross		–		–		6	–	5	–	0
Tulane		–		–		6	–	5	–	0
UNLV		–		–		6	–	6	–	0
South Carolina		–		–		6	–	6	–	0
Temple		–		–		5	–	5	–	0
Boston College		–		–		5	–	6	–	0
East Carolina		–		–		5	–	6	–	0
Northeast Louisiana		–		–		5	–	6	–	0
Louisville		–		–		5	–	6	–	0
Notre Dame		–		–		5	–	6	–	0
Rutgers		–		–		5	–	6	–	0
William & Mary		–		–		5	–	6	–	0
Syracuse		–		–		4	–	6	–	1
Richmond		–		–		4	–	7	–	0
Army		–		–		3	–	7	–	1
North Texas State		–		–		2	–	9	–	0
Georgia Tech		–		–		1	–	10	–	0
Memphis State		–		–		1	–	10	–	0
Rankings from AP Poll

The 1981 Colgate Red Raiders football team was an American football team that represented Colgate University as an independent during the 1981 NCAA Division I-A football season. In its sixth season under head coach Frederick Dunlap, the team compiled a 7–3 record. Karl Grabowski and Tom McChesney were the team captains.

This would be Colgate's final season in the NCAA's top level of competition. Shortly after the season ended, the NCAA reassigned the Red Raiders, along with the Ivy League and several other football teams, to Division I-AA, now known as the Football Championship Subdivision.

The team played its home games at Andy Kerr Stadium in Hamilton, New York.

== Schedule ==
Date	Opponent	Site	Result	Attendance	Source
September 12	at Rutgers	Rutgers Stadium; Piscataway, NJ	L 5–13	18,655	
September 19	Lehigh	Andy Kerr Stadium; Hamilton, NY	W 27–14	5,800	
September 26	at Cornell	Schoellkopf Field; Ithaca, NY (rivalry)	W 34–10	12,100	
October 3	Boston University	Andy Kerr Stadium; Hamilton, NY	W 21–14	5,100	
October 10	at Temple	Franklin Field; Philadelphia, PA	L 0–31	12,203	
October 17	Lafayette	Andy Kerr Stadium; Hamilton, NY	W 30–0	5,500	
October 24	at Columbia	Baker Field; New York, NY	W 41–3	4,975	
October 31	at Syracuse	Carrier Dome; Syracuse, NY (rivalry)	L 24–47	40,309	
November 7	Bucknell	Andy Kerr Stadium; Hamilton, NY	W 24–6		
November 14	at Holy Cross	Fitton Field; Worcester, MA	W 32–13	17,241	

== Leading players ==
Two trophies were awarded to the Red Raiders' most valuable players in 1981:

- Tom Rogers, wide receiver, received the Andy Kerr Trophy, awarded to the most valuable offensive player.
- Kelly Robinson, defensive end, received the Hal W. Lahar Trophy, awarded to the most valuable defensive player.

Statistical leaders for the 1981 Red Raiders included:

- Rushing: Rich Erenberg, 575 yards and 4 touchdowns on 142 attempts
- Passing: Steve Calabria, 1,620 yards, 121 completions and 11 touchdowns on 230 attempts
- Receiving: Tom Rogers, 768 yards and 4 touchdowns on 52 receptions
- Total offense: Steve Calabria, 1,719 yards (1,620 passing, 99 rushing)
- Scoring: Brian Byrne, 50 points from 26 PATs and 8 field goals
- All-purpose yards: Rich Erenberg, 810 yards (575 rushing, 152 kickoff returning, 47 receiving, 36 punt returning)
- Tackles: Dave Wolf, 150 total tackles
- Sacks: John Joyce, 3.5 quarterback sacks
