= 1981 Temple Owls football team =

American college football season

1981 Temple Owls football
- Conference: Independent
- Record: 5–5
- Head coach: Wayne Hardin (12th season)
- Home stadium: Veterans Stadium, Franklin Field

1981 Major eastern college football independents records
	Conf.					Overall
Team	W		L		T	W		L		T
No. 3 Penn State $	5	–	0	–	0	10	–	2	–	0
No. 4 Pittsburgh	5	–	1	–	0	11	–	1	–	0
No. 17 West Virginia	3	–	3	–	0	9	–	3	–	0
Temple	2	–	3	–	0	5	–	5	–	0
Syracuse	2	–	4	–	0	4	–	6	–	1
Boston College	1	–	4	–	0	5	–	6	–	0
Rutgers	1	–	4	–	0	5	–	6	–	0
$ – Lambert Trophy Winner; Rankings from AP Poll

1981 NCAA Division I-A independents football records
	Conf.					Overall
Team	W		L		T	W		L		T
No. 4 Pittsburgh		–		–		11	–	1	–	0
No. 3 Penn State		–		–		10	–	2	–	0
No. 8 Miami (FL)		–		–		9	–	2	–	0
Southern Miss		–		–		9	–	2	–	1
No. 17 West Virginia		–		–		9	–	3	–	0
Colgate		–		–		7	–	3	–	0
Virginia Tech		–		–		7	–	4	–	0
Navy		–		–		7	–	4	–	1
Cincinnati		–		–		6	–	5	–	0
Florida State		–		–		6	–	5	–	0
Holy Cross		–		–		6	–	5	–	0
Tulane		–		–		6	–	5	–	0
UNLV		–		–		6	–	6	–	0
South Carolina		–		–		6	–	6	–	0
Temple		–		–		5	–	5	–	0
Boston College		–		–		5	–	6	–	0
East Carolina		–		–		5	–	6	–	0
Northeast Louisiana		–		–		5	–	6	–	0
Louisville		–		–		5	–	6	–	0
Notre Dame		–		–		5	–	6	–	0
Rutgers		–		–		5	–	6	–	0
William & Mary		–		–		5	–	6	–	0
Syracuse		–		–		4	–	6	–	1
Richmond		–		–		4	–	7	–	0
Army		–		–		3	–	7	–	1
North Texas State		–		–		2	–	9	–	0
Georgia Tech		–		–		1	–	10	–	0
Memphis State		–		–		1	–	10	–	0
Rankings from AP Poll

The 1981 Temple Owls football team was an American football team that represented Temple University as an independent during the 1981 NCAA Division I-A football season. In its 12th season under head coach Wayne Hardin, the team compiled a 5–5 record and was outscored by a total of 195 to 181. The team played its home games at Veterans Stadium (two games) and Franklin Field (two games) in Philadelphia.

The team's statistical leaders included Tink Murphy with 1,589 passing yards, Jim Brown with 883 rushing yards and 66 points scored, and Gerald Lucear with 493 receiving yards.

== Schedule ==
Date	Opponent	Site	Result	Attendance	Source
September 5	William & Mary	Franklin Field; Philadelphia, PA	W 42–0	10,985	
September 12	Syracuse	Veterans Stadium; Philadelphia, PA	W 31–19	15,091	
September 19	at Delaware	Delaware Stadium; Newark, DE	L 7–13	22,379	
October 3	at No. 2 Penn State	Beaver Stadium; University Park, PA	L 0–30	84,562	
October 10	Colgate	Franklin Field; Philadelphia, PA	W 31–0	12,203	
October 17	at Rutgers	Rutgers Stadium; Piscataway, NJ	W 24–12	22,189	
October 24	at Cincinnati	Nippert Stadium; Cincinnati, OH	W 24–13	11,124	
October 31	at No. 5 Georgia	Sanford Stadium; Athens, GA	L 3–49	80,117	
November 7	at West Virginia	Mountaineer Field; Morgantown, WV	L 19–24	40,342	
November 21	No. 1 Pittsburgh	Veterans Stadium; Philadelphia, PA	L 0–35	32,570	
Rankings from AP Poll released prior to the game

== Roster ==
1981 Temple Owls football team roster
Players
Coaches
Offense

Pos.	#	Name	Class
QB	9	Tink Murphy	Sr
QB	14	Tim Riordan	So

Defense

Pos.	#	Name	Class
DB	36	Kevin Ross	So
DB	26	Anthony Yonug	Fr

Special teams

Pos.	#	Name	Class

Head coach

- Wayne Hardin

Coordinators/assistant coaches

Legend

- (C) Team captain
- (S) Suspended
- (I) Ineligible
- Injured
- Redshirt
