= 1981 Connecticut Huskies football team =

American college football season

1981 Connecticut Huskies football
- Conference: Yankee Conference
- Record: 4–7 (1–4 Yankee)
- Head coach: Walt Nadzak (5th season)
- Home stadium: Memorial Stadium

1981 Yankee Conference football standings
	Conf.					Overall
Team	W		L		T	W		L		T
Rhode Island +^	4	–	1	–	0	6	–	6	–	0
No. T–10 UMass +	4	–	1	–	0	6	–	3	–	0
Boston University	3	–	2	–	0	6	–	5	–	0
No. T–10 New Hampshire	2	–	3	–	0	7	–	3	–	0
Connecticut	1	–	4	–	0	4	–	7	–	0
Maine	1	–	4	–	0	3	–	7	–	1
+ – Conference co-champions; ^ – NCAA Division I-AA playoff participant; Rankings from NCAA Division I-AA Football Committee poll

The 1981 Connecticut Huskies football team represented the University of Connecticut in the 1981 NCAA Division I-AA football season. The Huskies were led by fifth-year head coach Walt Nadzak, and completed the season with a record of 4–7.

== Schedule ==
Date	Opponent	Rank	Site	Result	Attendance	Source
September 12	at Bucknell*		Christy Mathewson–Memorial Stadium; Lewistown, PA	W 27–7	4,500	
September 19	Northeastern*		Memorial Stadium; Storrs, CT	W 31–3	4,950	
September 26	at Yale*	No. 6	Yale Bowl; New Haven, CT	L 18–27	36,000	
October 3	No. T–9 New Hampshire	No. 8	Memorial Stadium; Storrs, CT	L 24–28		
October 10	at No. 6 Lehigh*		Taylor Stadium; Bethlehem, PA	L 17–21	11,874	
October 17	Holy Cross*		Memorial Stadium; Storrs, CT	W 44–24	11,884	
October 24	at Maine		Alumni Field; Orono, ME	W 31–10	2,300	
October 31	UMass		Memorial Stadium; Storrs, CT (rivalry)	L 24–29	15,980	
November 7	at Boston University		Nickerson Field; Boston, MA	L 20–37		
November 14	at Rhode Island		Meade Stadium; Kingston, RI (rivalry)	L 29–34		
November 27	No. 7 Delaware*		Memorial Stadium; Storrs, CT	L 26–35	5,084	
*Non-conference game; Rankings from NCAA Division I-AA Football Committee Poll released prior to the game
