= 1981 Penn State Nittany Lions football team =

American college football season

1981 Penn State Nittany Lions football

National champion (Dunkel) Eastern champion Fiesta Bowl champion

Fiesta Bowl, W 26–10 vs. USC
- Conference: Independent

Ranking
- Coaches: No. 3
- AP: No. 3
- Record: 10–2
- Head coach: Joe Paterno (16th season)
- Offensive coordinator: Dick Anderson (1st season)
- Offensive scheme: Pro-style
- Defensive coordinator: Jerry Sandusky (5th season)
- Base defense: 4–3
- Captains: Sean Farrell; Chet Parlavecchio; Leo Wisniewski
- Home stadium: Beaver Stadium

1981 Major eastern college football independents records
	Conf.					Overall
Team	W		L		T	W		L		T
No. 3 Penn State $	5	–	0	–	0	10	–	2	–	0
No. 4 Pittsburgh	5	–	1	–	0	11	–	1	–	0
No. 17 West Virginia	3	–	3	–	0	9	–	3	–	0
Temple	2	–	3	–	0	5	–	5	–	0
Syracuse	2	–	4	–	0	4	–	6	–	1
Boston College	1	–	4	–	0	5	–	6	–	0
Rutgers	1	–	4	–	0	5	–	6	–	0
$ – Lambert Trophy Winner; Rankings from AP Poll

1981 NCAA Division I-A independents football records
	Conf.					Overall
Team	W		L		T	W		L		T
No. 4 Pittsburgh		–		–		11	–	1	–	0
No. 3 Penn State		–		–		10	–	2	–	0
No. 8 Miami (FL)		–		–		9	–	2	–	0
Southern Miss		–		–		9	–	2	–	1
No. 17 West Virginia		–		–		9	–	3	–	0
Colgate		–		–		7	–	3	–	0
Virginia Tech		–		–		7	–	4	–	0
Navy		–		–		7	–	4	–	1
Cincinnati		–		–		6	–	5	–	0
Florida State		–		–		6	–	5	–	0
Holy Cross		–		–		6	–	5	–	0
Tulane		–		–		6	–	5	–	0
UNLV		–		–		6	–	6	–	0
South Carolina		–		–		6	–	6	–	0
Temple		–		–		5	–	5	–	0
Boston College		–		–		5	–	6	–	0
East Carolina		–		–		5	–	6	–	0
Northeast Louisiana		–		–		5	–	6	–	0
Louisville		–		–		5	–	6	–	0
Notre Dame		–		–		5	–	6	–	0
Rutgers		–		–		5	–	6	–	0
William & Mary		–		–		5	–	6	–	0
Syracuse		–		–		4	–	6	–	1
Richmond		–		–		4	–	7	–	0
Army		–		–		3	–	7	–	1
North Texas State		–		–		2	–	9	–	0
Georgia Tech		–		–		1	–	10	–	0
Memphis State		–		–		1	–	10	–	0
Rankings from AP Poll

The 1981 Penn State Nittany Lions football team represented Pennsylvania State University as an independent during the 1981 NCAA Division I-A football season. Led by 16th-year head coach Joe Paterno, the Nittany Lions compiled a record of 10–2. Penn State was invited to the Fiesta Bowl, where the Nittany Lions defeated USC. The team was selected national champion by Dunkel, an NCAA-designated major selector, while Clemson, who finished the season 12–0, was the consensus national champion.

== Schedule ==
Date	Time	Opponent	Rank	Site	TV	Result	Attendance	Source
September 12	1:30 p.m.	Cincinnati	No. 9	Beaver Stadium; University Park, PA	ESPN (tape delay)	W 52–0	84,342	
September 26	2:30 p.m.	at No. 15 Nebraska	No. 3	Memorial Stadium; Lincoln, NE	ESPN (tape delay)	W 30–24	76,308	
October 3	1:30 p.m.	Temple	No. 2	Beaver Stadium; University Park, PA		W 30–0	84,562	
October 10	1:30 p.m.	Boston College^{†}	No. 2	Beaver Stadium; University Park, PA	ESPN (tape delay)	W 38–7	84,473	
October 17	1:30 p.m.	at Syracuse	No. 2	Carrier Dome; Syracuse, NY (rivalry)		W 41–16	50,037	
October 24	1:30 p.m.	West Virginia	No. 1	Beaver Stadium; University Park, PA (rivalry)	ESPN (tape delay)	W 30–7	85,012	
October 31	4:00 p.m.	at Miami (FL)	No. 1	Miami Orange Bowl; Miami, FL	ABC	L 14–17	32,117	
November 7	1:00 p.m.	at NC State	No. 6	Carter–Finley Stadium; Raleigh, NC		W 22–15	48,800	
November 14	12:20 p.m.	No. 6 Alabama	No. 5	Beaver Stadium; University Park, PA (rivalry)	ABC regional	L 16–31	85,133	
November 21	1:00 p.m.	Notre Dame	No. 13	Beaver Stadium; University Park, PA (rivalry)	ESPN (tape delay)	W 24–21	84,175	
November 28	12:25 p.m.	at No. 1 Pittsburgh	No. 11	Pitt Stadium; Pittsburgh, PA (rivalry)	ABC	W 48–14	60,260	
January 1, 1982	1:30 p.m.	vs. No. 8 USC	No. 7	Sun Devil Stadium; Tempe, AZ (Fiesta Bowl)	NBC	W 26–10	71,053	
^{†}Homecoming; Rankings from AP Poll released prior to the game; All times are in Eastern time

== Game summaries ==
=== At Nebraska ===
Penn State at #15 Nebraska

Team	1	2	3	4	Total
• #3 Penn State	3	14	3	10	30
#15 Nebraska	0	10	14	0	24

- Date: September 26
- Location: Memorial Stadium, Lincoln, Nebraska
- Game attendance: 76,308

=== Boston College ===
Team	1	2	3	4	Total
Boston College	0	0	0	7	7
• Penn St	10	14	7	7	38

- Date: October 10
- Location: Beaver Stadium, University Park, PA
- Game attendance: 84,473

Scoring summary
Q1	PSU	Warner 7 yard run (Franco kick)	PSU 7–0
Q1	PSU	Franco 33 yard field goal	PSU 10–0
Q2	PSU	Meade 1 yard run (Franco kick)	PSU 17–0
Q2	PSU	Jackson 39 yard pass from Blackledge (Franco kick)	PSU 24–0
Q3	PSU	Warner 1 yard run (Franco kick)	PSU 31–0
Q4	PSU	Williams 36 yard run (Franco kick)	PSU 38–0
Q4	BC	Nizolek 23 yard pass from Flutie (Cooper kick)	PSU 38–7

=== Notre Dame ===
Notre Dame at #13 Penn St

Team	1	2	3	4	Total
Notre Dame	7	7	7	0	21
• Penn St	14	3	0	7	24

- Date: Saturday, November 21
- Location: Beaver Stadium, University Park, Pennsylvania
- Game attendance: 84,175
- Source: Eugene Register-Guard

Scoring summary
1		PSU	Williams 4-yard run (Franco kick)	PSU 7–0
1		ND	Carter 1-yard run (Oliver kick)	Tied 7–7
1		PSU	Blackledge 1-yard run (Franco kick)	PSU 14–7
2		PSU	Franco 27-yard field goal	PSU 17–7
2		ND	Hunter 17-yard pass from Kiel (Oliver kick)	PSU 17–14
3		ND	Sweeney 4-yard pass from Kiel (Oliver kick)	ND 21–17
4	3:48	PSU	Blackledge 1-yard run (Franco kick)	PSU 24–21

Following the game, Penn State accepted an invitation to the Fiesta Bowl.

=== Pittsburgh ===
#11 Penn St at #1 Pittsburgh

Team	1	2	3	4	Total
• Penn St	0	14	17	17	48
Pittsburgh	14	0	0	0	14

- Date: Saturday, November 28
- Location: Pitt Stadium, Pittsburgh, Pennsylvania
- Game attendance: 60,260
- TV announcers (ABC Sports): Bill Flemming, Darrell Royal, and Steve Zabriskie

The Nittany Lions snapped the Panthers' 17-game winning streak in convincing fashion.

=== Vs. USC (Fiesta Bowl) ===
#7 Penn State vs. #8 USC

Team	1	2	3	4	Total
• No. 7 Nittany Lions	7	10	9	0	26
No. 8 Trojans	7	0	3	0	10

- Date: January 1, 1982
- Location: Sun Devil Stadium, Tempe, Arizona
- Game attendance: 71,053
- TV announcers (NBC Sports): Charlie Jones, Len Dawson

== Roster ==
1981 Penn State Nittany Lions football team roster
Players
Coaches
Offense

Pos.	#	Name	Class
QB	14	Todd Blackledge	Jr
TE	80	Kirk Bowman	So
OT	79	Bill Contz	Jr
G	62	Sean Farrell	Sr
WR	19	Gregg Garrity	Jr
OT	72	Ron Heller	So
WR	82	Kenny Jackson	So
TE	85	Vyto Kab	Sr
TE	81	Mike McCloskey	Jr
RB	38	Mike Meade	Sr
G	78	Mike Munchak	Sr
C	53	Jim Romano	Sr
FB	43	Jon Williams	So
RB	25	Curt Warner	Jr

Defense

Pos.	#	Name	Class
DB	30	Matt Bradley	Sr
Hero	17	Harry Hamilton	So
CB	49	Roger Jackson	Jr
LB	98	Ken Kelley	Jr
CB	12	Paul Lankford	Sr
LB	37	Walker Lee Ashley	Jr
LB	94	Chet Parlavecchio	Jr
LB	97	Scott Radecic	So
DT	61	Leo Wisniewski	Sr

Special teams

Pos.	#	Name	Class
K	10	Brian Franco	Sr
P	21	Ralph Giacomarro	Jr

Head coach

- Joe Paterno

Coordinators/assistant coaches

- Dick Anderson
- John Bove
- Tom Bradley
- Booker Brooks
- Fran Ganter
- Bob Phillips
- John Rosenberg
- Jerry Sandusky
- Jim Williams

Legend

- (C) Team captain
- (S) Suspended
- (I) Ineligible
- Injured
- Redshirt

Roster

== Awards ==
- Joe Paterno: Bobby Dodd Coach of the Year Award

== NFL draft ==
Ten Nittany Lions were drafted in the 1982 NFL draft.

Round	Pick	Overall	Name	Position	Team
1st	8	8	Mike Munchak	Offensive guard	Houston Oilers
1st	17	17	Sean Farrell	Offensive guard	Tampa Bay Buccaneers
2nd	1	28	Leo Wisniewski	Nose tackle	Baltimore Colts
2nd	10	37	Jim Romano	Center	Los Angeles Raiders
3rd	23	78	Vyto Kab	Tight end	Philadelphia Eagles
3rd	25	80	Paul Lankford	Defensive back	Miami Dolphins
5th	15	126	Mike Meade	Running back	Green Bay Packers
6th	13	152	Chet Parlavecchio	Linebacker	Green Bay Packers
9th	11	234	Matt Bradley	Linebacker	Houston Oilers
10th	12	263	Rich D'Amico	Linebacker	Los Angeles Raiders
