= 1981 Delaware Fightin' Blue Hens football team =

American college football season

1981 Delaware Fightin' Blue Hens football

NCAA Division I-AA Quarterfinal, L 28–35 at Eastern Kentucky
- Conference: Independent
- Record: 9–3
- Head coach: Tubby Raymond (16th season)
- Offensive coordinator: Ted Kempski (14th season)
- Offensive scheme: Delaware Wing-T
- Base defense: 5–2
- Captain: Ed Braceland
- Home stadium: Delaware Stadium

1981 NCAA Division I-AA independents football standings
	Conf.			Overall
Team	W	L	T	W		L		T
No. 8 Lafayette		–		9	–	2	–	0
No. 7 Delaware ^		–		9	–	3	–	0
No. 6 Tennessee State ^		–		9	–	3	–	0
Southeastern Louisiana		–		8	–	3	–	0
Lehigh		–		8	–	3	–	0
Nicholls State		–		5	–	5	–	1
Northwestern State		–		4	–	6	–	0
Bucknell		–		4	–	6	–	0
Northeastern		–		3	–	7	–	0
James Madison		–		3	–	8	–	0
^ – NCAA Division I-AA playoff participant; Rankings from NCAA Division I-AA Football Committee poll

The 1981 Delaware Fightin' Blue Hens football team was an American football team that represented the University of Delaware as an independent during the 1981 NCAA Division I-AA football season. Delaware ended the regular season ranked No. 7 in the nation, but lost in the first round of the playoffs.

In their 16th year under head coach Tubby Raymond, the Hens compiled a 9–3 record (9–2 regular season). Ed Braceland was the team captain.

Starting the year on a three-game winning streak, the Hens were ranked No. 1 in the first two weeks of the weekly rankings. Though they dropped out of the top 10 in the middle of the year, a strong ending to the season saw them climb back to No. 7 in time to qualify for the eight-team playoff.

Delaware played its home games at Delaware Stadium on the university campus in Newark, Delaware.

== Schedule ==
Date	Opponent	Rank	Site	Result	Attendance	Source
September 12	at Western Kentucky		L.T. Smith Stadium; Bowling Green, KY	W 38–14	13,000	
September 19	Temple		Delaware Stadium; Newark, DE	W 13–7	22,379	
September 24	at Princeton	No. 1	Palmer Stadium; Princeton, NJ	W 61–8	10,110	
October 3	Lehigh	No. 1	Delaware Stadium; Newark, DE (rivalry)	L 21–24	22,784	
October 10	UMass	No. T–7	Delaware Stadium; Newark, DE	W 38–15	19,581	
October 17	Youngstown State	No. T–6	Delaware Stadium; Newark, DE	L 21–24	18,645	
October 24	Rhode Island^{†}		Delaware Stadium; Newark, DE	W 35–15	20,135	
November 7	at Penn		Franklin Field; Philadelphia, PA	W 40–6	10,117	
November 14	Maine	No. T–10	Delaware Stadium; Newark, DE	W 42–35	16,743	
November 21	West Chester	No. 8	Delaware Stadium; Newark, DE (rivalry)	W 31–14	17,767	
November 27	at Connecticut	No. 7	Memorial Stadium; Storrs, CT	W 35–26	5,084	
December 5	at No. 1 Eastern Kentucky	No. 7	Hanger Field; Richmond, KY (NCAA Division I-AA Quarterfinal)	L 28–35	8,100	
^{†}Homecoming; Rankings from NCAA Division I-AA Football Committee Poll released prior to the game
