= 1981 Lafayette Leopards football team =

American college football season

1981 Lafayette Leopards football
- Conference: Independent

Ranking
- AP: No. 8
- Record: 9–2
- Head coach: Bill Russo (1st season)
- Captains: Steve Biale; Joe Skladany
- Home stadium: Fisher Field

1981 NCAA Division I-AA independents football standings
	Conf.			Overall
Team	W	L	T	W		L		T
No. 8 Lafayette		–		9	–	2	–	0
No. 7 Delaware ^		–		9	–	3	–	0
No. 6 Tennessee State ^		–		9	–	3	–	0
Southeastern Louisiana		–		8	–	3	–	0
Lehigh		–		8	–	3	–	0
Nicholls State		–		5	–	5	–	1
Northwestern State		–		4	–	6	–	0
Bucknell		–		4	–	6	–	0
Northeastern		–		3	–	7	–	0
James Madison		–		3	–	8	–	0
^ – NCAA Division I-AA playoff participant; Rankings from NCAA Division I-AA Football Committee poll

The 1981 Lafayette Leopards football team was an American football team that represented Lafayette College as an independent during the 1981 NCAA Division I-AA football season. In their first year under head coach Bill Russo, the Leopards compiled a 9–2 record. Steve Biale and Joe Skladany were the team captains. Lafayette played home games at Fisher Field on College Hill in Easton, Pennsylvania.

== Schedule ==
Date	Opponent	Rank	Site	Result	Attendance	Source
September 12	at Central Connecticut State		Fisher Field; Easton, PA	W 51–0	5,200	
September 19	at Davidson		Richardson Stadium; Davidson, NC	W 14–7	4,700	
September 26	at Columbia		Baker Field; New York, NY	W 28–13	3,795	
October 3	Maine		Fisher Field; Easton, PA	W 17–0		
October 10	Bucknell	No. 10	Fisher Field; Easton, PA	W 37–0	11,500	
October 17	at Colgate	No. 8	Andy Kerr Stadium; Hamilton, NY	L 0–30	5,500	
October 24	at Gettysburg		Musselman Stadium; Gettysburg, PA	W 28–14	3,237	
October 31	C.W. Post		Fisher Field; Easton, PA	W 48–10		
November 7	No. 6 New Hampshire		Fisher Field; Easton, PA	L 18–21	5,300	
November 14	at Merchant Marine		Tomb Field; Kings Point, NY	W 49–13		
November 21	at No. 6 Lehigh		Taylor Stadium; Bethlehem, PA (The Rivalry)	W 10–3	19,000	
^ Parents Days; Rankings from NCAA Division I-AA Football Committee Poll released prior to the game
