= Mark Harriman =

American football coach (born c. 1958)

Biographical details
- Born: c. 1958 (age 67–68); Westbrook, Maine, U.S.
- Education: Springfield College (1980)

Playing career
- 1976–1979: Springfield
- Position: Linebacker

Coaching career (HC unless noted)
- 1980–1981: Maine (GA)
- 1982–1984: Maine (OLB)
- 1985–1988: Princeton (DE)
- 1989–1993: Princeton (DC/LB)
- 1994–1997: Harvard (DC/LB)
- 1998–2017: Bates

Administrative career (AD unless noted)
- ?–2017: Bates (assistant AD)

Head coaching record
- Overall: 47–114

Mark Harriman (born c. 1958) is an American former college football coach. He was the head football coach for Bates College from 1998 to 2017. He also coached for Maine, Princeton, and Harvard. He played college football for Springfield as a linebacker.

== Head coaching record ==
Year	Team	Overall	Conference	Standing	Bowl/playoffs
Bates Bobcats (New England Small College Athletic Conference) (1998–2017)
1998	Bates	1–7	1–7	T–9th	
1999	Bates	4–4	4–4	T–6th	
2000	Bates	2–6	2–6	T–7th	
2001	Bates	1–7	1–7	T–8th	
2002	Bates	3–5	3–5	T–7th	
2003	Bates	2–6	2–6	T–8th	
2004	Bates	2–6	2–6	T–7th	
2005	Bates	2–6	2–6	T–7th	
2006	Bates	1–7	1–7	10th	
2007	Bates	1–7	1–7	10th	
2008	Bates	2–6	2–6	T–8th	
2009	Bates	1–7	1–7	10th	
2010	Bates	2–6	2–6	8th	
2011	Bates	3–5	3–5	T–6th	
2012	Bates	5–3	5–3	T–4th	
2013	Bates	4–4	4–4	T–5th	
2014	Bates	4–4	4–4	T–5th	
2015	Bates	2–6	2–6	T–6th	
2016	Bates	3–5	3–5	T–6th	
2017	Bates	2–7	2–7	8th	
Bates:		47–114	47–114		
Total:		47–114			
