= 1981 NCAA Division I-AA football season =

American college football season

1981 NCAA Division I-AA season

Regular season
- Number of teams: 51
- Duration: September 5–November 28, 1981

Playoff
- Duration: December 5–December 19, 1981
- Championship date: December 19, 1981
- Championship site: Memorial Stadium; Wichita Falls, Texas
- Champion: Idaho State

NCAA Division I-AA football seasons
- «1980 1982»

The 1981 NCAA Division I-AA football season, part of college football in the United States organized by the National Collegiate Athletic Association at the Division I-AA level, began in August 1981 and concluded with the 1981 NCAA Division I-AA Football Championship Game in the Pioneer Bowl on December 19, at Memorial Stadium in Wichita Falls, Texas. The Idaho State Bengals won their first I-AA championship, defeating the Eastern Kentucky Colonels, 34−23.

== Conference changes and new programs ==
- Prior to the 1981 season, the Mid-Continent Conference reclassified from Division II to Division I-AA with its four members, Eastern Illinois, Northern Iowa, Western Illinois, and Southwest Missouri State (now Missouri State). Northern Michigan and Youngstown State, which had been members of the Mid-Continent in the 1980 season, departed the league before the shift; Northern Michigan remained in Division II, and Youngstown State transitioned to I-AA as a member of the Ohio Valley Conference.

| School | 1980 Conference | 1981 Conference |
|---|---|---|
| Eastern Illinois | Mid-Continent (D-II) | Mid-Continent (I-AA) |
| Northern Iowa | Mid-Continent (D-II) | Mid-Continent (I-AA) |
| Portland State | I-AA Independent | D-II Independent |
| Southwest Missouri State | Mid-Continent (D-II) | Mid-Continent (I-AA) |
| Tennessee State | I-A Independent | I-AA Independent |
| Western Illinois | Mid-Continent (D-II) | Mid-Continent (I-AA) |
| Youngstown State | Mid-Continent (D-II) | Ohio Valley (I-AA) |

== Conference standings ==
1981 Association of Mid-Continent Universities football standings
| | Conf. | | | | | Overall |
| Team | W | | L | | T | W | | L | | T |
|---|---|---|---|---|---|---|---|---|---|---|
| Northern Iowa + | 2 | – | 1 | – | 0 | 7 | – | 4 | – | 0 |
| Eastern Illinois + | 2 | – | 1 | – | 0 | 6 | – | 5 | – | 0 |
| Western Illinois + | 2 | – | 1 | – | 0 | 5 | – | 6 | – | 0 |
| Southwest Missouri State | 0 | – | 3 | – | 0 | 3 | – | 5 | – | 2 |
+ – Conference co-champions

1981 Big Sky Conference football standings
| | Conf. | | | | | Overall |
| Team | W | | L | | T | W | | L | | T |
|---|---|---|---|---|---|---|---|---|---|---|
| No. 2 Idaho State $^ | 6 | – | 1 | – | 0 | 12 | – | 1 | – | 0 |
| No. 5 Boise State ^ | 6 | – | 1 | – | 0 | 10 | – | 3 | – | 0 |
| Montana | 5 | – | 2 | – | 0 | 7 | – | 3 | – | 0 |
| Nevada | 4 | – | 3 | – | 0 | 7 | – | 4 | – | 0 |
| Weber State | 4 | – | 3 | – | 0 | 7 | – | 4 | – | 0 |
| Northern Arizona | 2 | – | 5 | – | 0 | 4 | – | 7 | – | 0 |
| Montana State | 1 | – | 6 | – | 0 | 3 | – | 7 | – | 0 |
| Idaho | 0 | – | 7 | – | 0 | 3 | – | 8 | – | 0 |
$ – Conference champion; ^ – NCAA Division I-AA playoff participant; Rankings from NCAA Division I-AA Committee poll

1981 Mid-Eastern Athletic Conference football standings
| | Conf. | | | | | Overall |
| Team | W | | L | | T | W | | L | | T |
|---|---|---|---|---|---|---|---|---|---|---|
| No. 3 South Carolina State $^ | 5 | – | 0 | – | 0 | 10 | – | 3 | – | 0 |
| Florida A&M | 4 | – | 1 | – | 0 | 7 | – | 4 | – | 0 |
| Bethune–Cookman | 3 | – | 2 | – | 0 | 6 | – | 4 | – | 0 |
| Howard | 2 | – | 3 | – | 0 | 6 | – | 5 | – | 0 |
| Delaware State | 1 | – | 4 | – | 0 | 2 | – | 9 | – | 0 |
| North Carolina A&T | 0 | – | 5 | – | 0 | 3 | – | 8 | – | 0 |
$ – Conference champion; ^ – NCAA Division I-AA playoff participant; Rankings from NCAA Division I-AA Football Committee poll

1981 Ohio Valley Conference football standings
| | Conf. | | | | | Overall |
| Team | W | | L | | T | W | | L | | T |
|---|---|---|---|---|---|---|---|---|---|---|
| No. 1 Eastern Kentucky $^ | 8 | – | 0 | – | 0 | 12 | – | 2 | – | 0 |
| No. 9 Murray State | 5 | – | 3 | – | 0 | 8 | – | 3 | – | 0 |
| Youngstown State | 5 | – | 3 | – | 0 | 7 | – | 4 | – | 0 |
| Tennessee Tech | 4 | – | 4 | – | 0 | 6 | – | 5 | – | 0 |
| Middle Tennessee | 4 | – | 4 | – | 0 | 6 | – | 5 | – | 0 |
| Western Kentucky | 4 | – | 4 | – | 0 | 6 | – | 5 | – | 0 |
| Akron | 4 | – | 4 | – | 0 | 5 | – | 5 | – | 0 |
| Austin Peay | 3 | – | 5 | – | 0 | 5 | – | 5 | – | 0 |
| Morehead State | 0 | – | 8 | – | 0 | 1 | – | 9 | – | 0 |
$ – Conference champion; ^ – NCAA Division I-AA playoff participant; Rankings from NCAA Division I-AA Football Committee poll

1981 Southwestern Athletic Conference football standings
| | Conf. | | | | | Overall |
| Team | W | | L | | T | W | | L | | T |
|---|---|---|---|---|---|---|---|---|---|---|
| No. 4 Jackson State $^ | 5 | – | 1 | – | 0 | 9 | – | 2 | – | 1 |
| Grambling State | 4 | – | 1 | – | 1 | 6 | – | 4 | – | 1 |
| Texas Southern | 3 | – | 2 | – | 1 | 4 | – | 5 | – | 1 |
| Alcorn State | 3 | – | 3 | – | 0 | 5 | – | 5 | – | 0 |
| Mississippi Valley State | 2 | – | 4 | – | 0 | 4 | – | 6 | – | 1 |
| Southern | 2 | – | 4 | – | 0 | 3 | – | 8 | – | 0 |
| Prairie View A&M | 1 | – | 5 | – | 0 | 2 | – | 8 | – | 0 |
$ – Conference champion; ^ – NCAA Division I-AA playoff participant; Rankings from NCAA Division I-AA Football Committee poll

1981 Yankee Conference football standings
| | Conf. | | | | | Overall |
| Team | W | | L | | T | W | | L | | T |
|---|---|---|---|---|---|---|---|---|---|---|
| Rhode Island +^ | 4 | – | 1 | – | 0 | 6 | – | 6 | – | 0 |
| No. T–10 UMass + | 4 | – | 1 | – | 0 | 6 | – | 3 | – | 0 |
| Boston University | 3 | – | 2 | – | 0 | 6 | – | 5 | – | 0 |
| No. T–10 New Hampshire | 2 | – | 3 | – | 0 | 7 | – | 3 | – | 0 |
| Connecticut | 1 | – | 4 | – | 0 | 4 | – | 7 | – | 0 |
| Maine | 1 | – | 4 | – | 0 | 3 | – | 7 | – | 1 |
+ – Conference co-champions; ^ – NCAA Division I-AA playoff participant; Rankings from NCAA Division I-AA Football Committee poll

1981 NCAA Division I-AA independents football standings
| | Conf. | | | Overall |
| Team | W | L | T | W | | L | | T |
|---|---|---|---|---|---|---|---|---|
| No. 8 Lafayette | | – | | 9 | – | 2 | – | 0 |
| No. 7 Delaware ^ | | – | | 9 | – | 3 | – | 0 |
| No. 6 Tennessee State ^ | | – | | 9 | – | 3 | – | 0 |
| Southeastern Louisiana | | – | | 8 | – | 3 | – | 0 |
| Lehigh | | – | | 8 | – | 3 | – | 0 |
| Nicholls State | | – | | 5 | – | 5 | – | 1 |
| Northwestern State | | – | | 4 | – | 6 | – | 0 |
| Bucknell | | – | | 4 | – | 6 | – | 0 |
| Northeastern | | – | | 3 | – | 7 | – | 0 |
| James Madison | | – | | 3 | – | 8 | – | 0 |
^ – NCAA Division I-AA playoff participant; Rankings from NCAA Division I-AA Football Committee poll

== Conference champions ==
Conference champions

Big Sky Conference – Idaho State
Mid-Continent Conference – Eastern Illinois, Western Illinois, Northern Iowa
Mid-Eastern Athletic Conference – South Carolina State
Ohio Valley Conference – Eastern Kentucky
Southwestern Athletic Conference – Jackson State
Yankee Conference – Massachusetts and Rhode Island

== Postseason ==
After holding four-team playoffs after the first three I-AA seasons, the NCAA increased the bracket size to eight this postseason. It grew to twelve in 1982 and sixteen in 1986. The eight-team field was determined via automatic bids to five conference champions (Idaho State, South Carolina State, Eastern Kentucky, Jackson State, and Rhode Island), a bid to the top-ranked independent team (Tennessee State), and two at-large bids (Boise State and Delaware).

=== NCAA Division I-AA playoff bracket ===
First Round; December 5 Campus sites
7 | Delaware | 28
1 | Eastern Kentucky* | 35
4 | Boise State | 19
5 | Jackson State* | 7
8 | Rhode Island | 0
2 | Idaho State* | 51
6 | Tennessee State | 25
3 | South Carolina State* | 26*

Semifinals; December 12; Campus sites
1 | Eastern Kentucky | 23
4 | Boise State* | 17
2 | Idaho State* | 41
3 | South Carolina State | 12

National Championship Game; Pioneer Bowl; December 19; Memorial Stadium—Wichita Falls, TX
1 | Eastern Kentucky | 23
2 | Idaho State | 34

* Next to team name denotes host institution
* Next to score denotes overtime
