= 1981 NCAA Division I-AA football rankings =

The 1981 NCAA Division I-AA football rankings are from the NCAA Division I-AA football committee. This is for the 1981 season.

== Legend ==
	Increase in ranking
	Decrease in ranking
	Not ranked previous week
(#–#)	Win–loss record
(Italics)	Number of first place votes
т	Tied with team above or below also with this symbol

== NCAA Division I-AA Football Committee poll ==
	Week 1 Sept 22	Week 2 Sept 29	Week 3 Oct 6	Week 4 Oct 13	Week 5 Oct 20	Week 6 Oct 27	Week 7 Nov 3	Week 8 Nov 10	Week 9 Nov 17	Week 10 Nov 24	Week 11 Dec 1	
1.	Delaware (2–0)	Delaware (3–0)	Murray State (5–0)	Murray State (6–0)	Eastern Kentucky (6–1) т	Eastern Kentucky (7–1) (4)	Eastern Kentucky (8–1) (4)	Eastern Kentucky (9–1)	Eastern Kentucky (9–1) (3)	Eastern Kentucky (10–1) (4)	Eastern Kentucky (10–1) (4)	1.
2.	Murray State (3–0)	Murray State (4–0)	Idaho State (4–0)	Idaho State (5–0)	Jackson State (6–0–1) т	New Hampshire (6–1)	Idaho State (6–1)	Idaho State (7–1)	Idaho State (8–1) (1)	Idaho State (9–1)	Idaho State (9–1)	2.
3.	Idaho State (2–0)	Idaho State (3–0)	Jackson State (4–0–1)	Jackson State (5–0–1)	New Hampshire (5–1)	Idaho State (5–1)	Boise State (7–1)	South Carolina State (8–2)	South Carolina State (9–2)	South Carolina State (9–2)	South Carolina State (9–2)	3.
4.	Jackson State (2–0–1)	Jackson State (3–0–1)	Eastern Kentucky (4–1)	Eastern Kentucky (5–1)	Murray State (6–1)	Boise State (6–1)	South Carolina State (7–2)	New Hampshire (7–2)	Boise State (8–2)	Jackson State (8–1–1)	Jackson State (9–1–1)	4.
5.	Eastern Kentucky (2–1)	Eastern Kentucky (3–1)	New Hampshire (4–0)	Lehigh (4–1)	Idaho State (5–1)	Grambling State (5–2)	Tennessee State (7–1)	Tennessee State (8–1)	Jackson State (8–1–1)	Boise State (9–2)	Boise State (9–2)	5.
6.	Connecticut (2–0)	UMass (2–0) (Note: In the actual printed polls, UMass was listed as Massachusetts)	Lehigh (3–1)	Boise State (5–1) т	Boise State (5–1)	South Carolina State (6–2)	New Hampshire (6–2)	Boise State (7–2)	Lehigh (8–2)	Tennessee State (9–2)	Tennessee State (9–2)	6.
7.	Montana State (1–1)	Montana State (2–1)	Boise State (4–1) т	Delaware (4–1) т	Middle Tennessee State (5–2)	Jackson State (6–1–1) т	Jackson State (6–1–1) т	Jackson State (7–1–1)	Tennessee State (8–2)	Delaware (8–2)	Delaware (9–2)	7.
8.	Grambling State (2–1)	Connecticut (2–1)	Delaware (3–1) т	Lafayette (5–0)	South Carolina State (5–2) т	Tennessee State (6–1) т	Lehigh (6–2) т	Lehigh (7–2)	Delaware (7–2)	Lafayette (9–2)	Lafayette (9–2)	8.
9.	New Hampshire (2–0)	Boise State (3–1) т	Weber State (3–1)	Weber State (4–1)	Lehigh (4–2) т	Lehigh (5–2)	Montana (6–1)	Montana (7–1)	UMass (6–3)	Murray State (8–3)	Murray State (8–3)	9.
10.	Boise State (2–1)	New Hampshire (3–0) т	Lafayette (4–0)	New Hampshire (4–1)	Montana (4–1)	Montana (5–1) т	Grambling State (5–2–1) т	Delaware (6–2) т	New Hampshire (7–3) т	UMass (6–3) т	UMass (6–3) т	10.
11.		South Carolina State (3–1) т				Murray State (6–2) т	Rhode Island (5–3) т	Grambling State (6–2–1) т	Youngstown State (7–3) т	New Hampshire (7–3) т	New Hampshire (7–3) т	11.
	Week 1 Sept 22	Week 2 Sept 29	Week 3 Oct 6	Week 4 Oct 13	Week 5 Oct 20	Week 6 Oct 27	Week 7 Nov 3	Week 8 Nov 10	Week 9 Nov 17	Week 10 Nov 24	Week 11 Dec 1	
		Dropped: 8 Grambling State	Dropped: 6 UMass; 7 Montana State; 8 Connecticut; 10 South Carolina State	None	Dropped: 7 Delaware; 8 Lafayette; 9 Weber State	Dropped: 7 Middle Tennessee State	Dropped: 10 Murray State	Dropped: 10 Rhode Island	Dropped: 9 Montana; 10 Grambling State	Dropped: 6 Lehigh; 10 Youngstown State	None	
