= Donnie Duncan =

American football coach and college athletics administrator

Biographical details
- Born: August 28, 1940
- Died: March 12, 2016 (aged 75); Dallas, Texas, U.S.

Playing career

Football
- c. 1960: Austin

Baseball
- c. 1960: Austin

Coaching career (HC unless noted)

Football
- 1962: Dublin HS (TX) (line)
- 1963: Tarleton State (OE)
- 1965–1966: Honey Grove HS (TX)
- 1967–1969: Henderson County (assistant)
- 1970–1972: Navarro
- 1973–1978: Oklahoma (assistant)
- 1979–1982: Iowa State

Track and field
- 1967–1970: Henderson County

Administrative career (AD unless noted)
- 1970–1973: Navarro
- 1986–1996: Oklahoma
- 1996–2016: Big 12 (dir. of football ops.)

Head coaching record
- Overall: 18–24–2 (college football); 24–7–1 (junior college football); 20–3–1 (high school football)
- Bowls: 1–0 (junior college)

Donnie Duncan (August 28, 1940 – March 12, 2016) was an American football coach and college athletics administrator. He served as the head football coach at Iowa State University from 1979 to 1982, compiling a record of 18–24–2. His 1980 and 1981 Cyclones squads both made appearances in the national rankings. The 1981 Cyclones began the season at 5–1–1 and rose to No. 11 in the AP Poll. Led by future National Football League (NFL) players Dwayne Crutchfield, Dan Johnson, Karl Nelson and Chris Washington, the Cyclones tied No. 5 Oklahoma (7–7) and downed No. 8 Missouri (34–13).

A native of Celeste, Texas, Duncan played college football and college baseball at Austin College in Sherman, Texas. He began his coaching career in 1962 as line coach at Dublin High School in Dublin, Texas. The following year he moved to Tarleton State College—now known as Tarleton State University—in Stephenville, Texas as offensive ends coach. From 1965 to 1966, Duncan was the head football coach at Honey Grove High School in Honey Grove, Texas, leading the Warriors to a record of 20–3–1 in two season. In 1967, he was hired at Henderson County Junior College—now known as Trinity Valley Community College—as assistant football coach under Bob Baccarini and track coach.

Duncan died from cancer on March 12, 2016, in Dallas.

== Head coaching record ==
=== College football ===
| Year | Team | Overall | Conference | Standing |
|---|---|---|---|---|
Iowa State Cyclones (Big Eight Conference) (1979–1982)
| 1979 | Iowa State | 3–8 | 2–5 | T–5th |
| 1980 | Iowa State | 6–5 | 3–4 | T–4th |
| 1981 | Iowa State | 5–5–1 | 2–4–1 | 6th |
| 1982 | Iowa State | 4–6–1 | 1–5–1 | T–6th |
| Iowa State: | | 18–24–2 | 7–19–2 | |
| Total: | | 18–24–2 | | |

=== Junior college football ===
| Year | Team | Overall | Conference | Standing | Bowl/playoffs |
|---|---|---|---|---|---|
Navarro Bulldogs (Texas Junior College Football Federation) (1970–1972)
| 1970 | Navarro | 11–1 | 6–1 | 2nd | W Wool Bowl |
| 1971 | Navarro | 6–3–1 | 4–3 | 4th | |
| 1972 | Navarro | 7–3 | 5–2 | T–2nd | |
| Navarro: | | 24–7–1 | 15–6 | | |
| Total: | | 24–7–1 | | | |
