= 1981 West Texas State Buffaloes football team =

American college football season

1981 West Texas State Buffaloes football
- Conference: Missouri Valley Conference
- Record: 7–4 (3–3 MVC)
- Head coach: Bill Yung (5th season)
- Home stadium: Kimbrough Memorial Stadium

1981 Missouri Valley Conference football standings
	Conf.					Overall
Team	W		L		T	W		L		T
Drake +	5	–	1	–	0	10	–	1	–	0
Tulsa +	5	–	1	–	0	6	–	5	–	0
Southern Illinois	5	–	2	–	0	7	–	4	–	0
West Texas State	3	–	3	–	0	7	–	4	–	0
Wichita State	3	–	3	–	1	4	–	6	–	1
Indiana State	2	–	4	–	1	5	–	5	–	1
New Mexico State	1	–	5	–	0	3	–	8	–	0
Illinois State	0	–	5	–	0	3	–	7	–	0
+ – Conference co-champions

The 1981 West Texas State Buffaloes football team was an American football team that represented West Texas State University — now known as West Texas A&M University — as a member of the Missouri Valley Conference (MVC) during the 1981 NCAA Division I-A football season. In their fifth and final year under head coach Bill Yung, the Buffaloes compiled an overall record of 7–4 with a mark of 3–3 in conference play, trying for fourth place in the MVC.

== Schedule ==
Date	Opponent	Site	Result	Attendance	Source
September 5	Louisiana Tech*	Kimbrough Memorial Stadium; Canyon, TX	W 17–10		
September 12	at Iowa State*	Cyclone Stadium; Ames, IA	L 13–17	49,854	
September 19	at UNLV*	Las Vegas Silver Bowl; Whitney, NV	W 21–17	24,560	
September 26	UT Arlington*	Kimbrough Memorial Stadium; Canyon, TX	W 35–31	11,500	
October 3	at McNeese State*	Cowboy Stadium; Lake Charles, LA	W 31–24	20,850	
October 10	Southern Illinois	Kimbrough Memorial Stadium; Canyon, TX	L 22–29	9,950	
October 17	at Wichita State	Cessna Stadium; Wichita, KS	W 23–17	17,000	
October 24	at Drake	Drake Stadium; Des Moines, IA	L 13–21	13,849	
November 7	Indiana State^{†}	Kimbrough Memorial Stadium; Canyon, TX	W 17–14		
November 14	Tulsa	Kimbrough Memorial Stadium; Canyon, TX	L 10–24	8,300	
November 21	at New Mexico State	Aggie Memorial Stadium; Las Cruces, NM	W 45–9	10,627	
*Non-conference game; ^{†}Homecoming
