= 1981 Eastern Illinois Panthers football team =

American college football season

1981 Eastern Illinois Panthers football

Mid-Con co-champion
- Conference: Association of Mid-Continent Universities
- Record: 6–5 (2–1 Mid-Con)
- Head coach: Darrell Mudra (4th season)
- Home stadium: O'Brien Stadium

1981 Association of Mid-Continent Universities football standings
	Conf.					Overall
Team	W		L		T	W		L		T
Northern Iowa +	2	–	1	–	0	5	–	6	–	0
Eastern Illinois +	2	–	1	–	0	6	–	5	–	0
Western Illinois +	2	–	1	–	0	5	–	6	–	0
Southwest Missouri State	0	–	3	–	0	3	–	5	–	2
+ – Conference co-champions

The 1981 Eastern Illinois Panthers football team represented Eastern Illinois University as a member of the Association of Mid-Continent Universities during the 1981 NCAA Division I-AA football season, and completed the 80th season of Panther football. The Panthers were led by fourth-year head coach Darrell Mudra and played their home games at O'Brien Stadium in Charleston, Illinois. Eastern Illinois finished the season with an overall record of 6–5 and shared the conference title with Northern Iowa and Western Illinois.

== Schedule ==
Date	Opponent	Site	Result	Attendance	Source
September 5	at South Dakota*	DakotaDome; Vermillion, SD	W 19–17		
September 12	Southwest Missouri State	O'Brien Stadium; Charleston, IL	W 23–14		
September 19	at Northeast Missouri State*	Stokes Stadium; Kirksville, MO	L 14–21		
September 26	Central State (OH)*	O'Brien Stadium; Charleston, IL	W 58–0		
October 10	at Illinois State*	Hancock Stadium; Normal, IL (rivalry)	L 3–25	7,808	
October 17	Western Illinois	O'Brien Stadium; Charleston, IL	W 20–8	5,000	
October 24	at Youngstown State*	Rayen Stadium; Youngstown, OH	L 16–48		
October 31	at Northern Iowa	UNI-Dome; Cedar Falls, IA	L 17–38		
November 7	Ferris State*	O'Brien Stadium; Charleston, IL	W 42–14		
November 14	Indiana State*	O'Brien Stadium; Charleston, IL	L 14–27		
November 21	Delaware State*	O'Brien Stadium; Charleston, IL	W 24–16		
*Non-conference game

== Roster ==
1981 Eastern Illinois Panthers football team roster
Players
Coaches
Offense

Pos.	#	Name	Class
QB	11	Jeff Christensen	Jr
C	60	Scott Gilleland	Sr
TE	81	Rob Mehalic	Sr

Defense

Pos.	#	Name	Class
CB	15	David Cobb
S	10	Kevin Gray	Sr
CB	20	Wilbert James	Sr
LB	57	Tom Murray	Sr
SS	28	Robert Williams	So
DT	86	Keith Wojnowski	Jr

Special teams

Pos.	#	Name	Class

Head coach

- Darrell Mudra

Coordinators/assistant coaches

Legend

- (C) Team captain
- (S) Suspended
- (I) Ineligible
- Injured
- Redshirt
