= 1981 Kansas Jayhawks football team =

American college football season

1981 Kansas Jayhawks football

Hall of Fame Classic, L 0–10 vs. Mississippi State
- Conference: Big Eight Conference
- Record: 8–4 (4–3 Big 8)
- Head coach: Don Fambrough (7th season)
- Captains: David Lawrence; Greg Smith
- Home stadium: Memorial Stadium

1981 Big Eight Conference football standings
	Conf.					Overall
Team	W		L		T	W		L		T
No. 11 Nebraska $	7	–	0	–	0	9	–	3	–	0
No. 20 Oklahoma	4	–	2	–	1	7	–	4	–	1
Kansas	4	–	3	–	0	7	–	5	–	0
Oklahoma State	4	–	3	–	0	7	–	5	–	0
No. 19 Missouri	3	–	4	–	0	8	–	4	–	0
Iowa State	2	–	4	–	1	5	–	5	–	1
Colorado	2	–	5	–	0	3	–	8	–	0
Kansas State	1	–	6	–	0	2	–	9	–	0
$ – Conference champion; Rankings from AP Poll

The 1981 Kansas Jayhawks football team represented the University of Kansas in the Big Eight Conference during the 1981 NCAA Division I-A football season. In their seventh season under head coach Don Fambrough, the Jayhawks compiled an 8–4 record (4–3 against conference opponents), tied for third place in the conference, and were outscored by opponents by a combined total of 195 to 188. They played their home games at Memorial Stadium in Lawrence, Kansas.

The team's statistical leaders included Frank Seurer with 1,199 passing yards, Garfield Taylor with 728 rushing yards, and Wayne Capers with 629 receiving yards. David Lawrence and Greg Smith were the team captains.

== Schedule ==
Date	Opponent	Site	Result	Attendance	Source
September 5	at Tulsa*	Skelly Stadium; Tulsa, OK	W 15–11	36,824	
September 12	Oregon*	Memorial Stadium; Lawrence, KS	W 19–10	33,840	
September 26	Kentucky*	Memorial Stadium; Lawrence, KS	W 21–16	40,200	
October 3	Arkansas State*	Memorial Stadium; Lawrence, KS	W 17–16	32,100	
October 10	Oklahoma State^{†}	Memorial Stadium; Lawrence, KS	L 7–20	39,810	
October 17	at Oklahoma	Oklahoma Memorial Stadium; Norman, OK	L 7–45	75,644	
October 24	Kansas State	Memorial Stadium; Lawrence, KS (rivalry)	W 17–14	51,600	
October 31	at No. 12 Nebraska	Memorial Stadium; Lincoln, NE (rivalry)	L 15–31	76,208	
November 7	at Iowa State	Cyclone Stadium; Ames, IA	W 24–11	49,720	
November 14	Colorado	Memorial Stadium; Lawrence, KS	W 27–0	31,500	
November 21	Missouri	Memorial Stadium; Lawrence, KS (Border War)	W 19–11	47,500	
December 31	vs. Mississippi State*	Legion Field; Birmingham, AL (Hall of Fame Classic)	L 0–10	41,672	
*Non-conference game; ^{†}Homecoming; Rankings from AP Poll released prior to the game

== Roster ==
1981 Kansas Jayhawks football team roster
Players
Coaches
Offense

Pos.	#	Name	Class
QB	16	Mike Bohn	Jr
TE	80	Sylvester Byrd	Fr
WR	20	Wayne Capers	Jr
G	69	Paul Fairchild	Jr
WR	88	Bobby Johnson	Jr
FB	39	E. J. Jones	So
OT	78	Jay McAdam	Sr
QB	15	Mike Phipps	Jr
QB	10	Frank Seurer	So
OT	76	Reggie Smith	So
QB	12	Steve Smith	Sr

Defense

Pos.	#	Name	Class
DT	70	Cedric Alexander	Fr
DB	2	Dino Bell	Fr
CB	33	Jeff Colter	Jr
LB	45	Scott Connors	So
CB	32	Elvis Patterson	So
DT	77	Greg Smith	Sr
DB	5	Dan Wagoner	Sr

Special teams

Pos.	#	Name	Class
P	8	Bucky Scribner	Jr

Head coach

- Don Fambrough

Coordinators/assistant coaches

Legend

- (C) Team captain
- (S) Suspended
- (I) Ineligible
- Injured
- Redshirt
