= 1981 Colorado Buffaloes football team =

American college football season

1981 Colorado Buffaloes football
- Conference: Big Eight Conference
- Record: 3–8 (2–5 Big 8)
- Head coach: Chuck Fairbanks (3rd season)
- Offensive coordinator: Gene Hochevar (2nd season)
- Offensive scheme: Multiple
- Defensive coordinator: Doug Knotts (3rd season)
- Base defense: 3–4
- MVP: Pete Perry
- Captains: Pete Perry; Bob Sebro
- Home stadium: Folsom Field

1981 Big Eight Conference football standings
	Conf.					Overall
Team	W		L		T	W		L		T
No. 11 Nebraska $	7	–	0	–	0	9	–	3	–	0
No. 20 Oklahoma	4	–	2	–	1	7	–	4	–	1
Kansas	4	–	3	–	0	7	–	5	–	0
Oklahoma State	4	–	3	–	0	7	–	5	–	0
No. 19 Missouri	3	–	4	–	0	8	–	4	–	0
Iowa State	2	–	4	–	1	5	–	5	–	1
Colorado	2	–	5	–	0	3	–	8	–	0
Kansas State	1	–	6	–	0	2	–	9	–	0
$ – Conference champion; Rankings from AP Poll

The 1981 Colorado Buffaloes football team represented the University of Colorado at Boulder in the Big Eight Conference during the 1981 NCAA Division I-A football season. It was the third and final season for Chuck Fairbanks' as head coach, and the first year of blue jerseys for the Buffaloes, which were phased out in 1984.

The Buffaloes finished at 3–8 (2–5 in Big 8, seventh) for a third consecutive losing season. Home games were played on campus at Folsom Field in Boulder. After a shutout loss at Kansas, CU defeated last-place Kansas State by three points at home in the season finale to avoid the conference cellar.

Well after the season in June 1982, Fairbanks resigned to become head coach, president, and minority owner of the New Jersey Generals of the new United States Football League (USFL). His overall record at CU was a disappointing 7–26 (.212), 5–16 (.238) in conference. Bill McCartney, the defensive coordinator at Michigan under Bo Schembechler, was announced as Colorado's new head coach on June 9, and led the program for thirteen seasons, through 1994.

== Schedule ==
Date	Opponent	Site	Result	Attendance	Source
September 12	Texas Tech*	Folsom Field; Boulder, CO	W 45–27	34,884	
September 19	Washington State*	Folsom Field; Boulder, CO	L 10–14	35,277	
September 26	No. 11 BYU*	Folsom Field; Boulder, CO	L 20–41	43,259	
October 3	at No. 16 UCLA*	Los Angeles Memorial Coliseum; Los Angeles, CA	L 7–27	40,347	
October 10	at Nebraska	Memorial Stadium; Lincoln, NE (rivalry)	L 0–59	76,168	
October 17	Oklahoma State^{†}	Folsom Field; Boulder, CO	W 11–10	36,101	
October 24	at No. 14 Iowa State	Cyclone Stadium; Ames, IA	L 10–17	50,103	
October 31	at No. 19 Oklahoma	Oklahoma Memorial Stadium; Norman, OK	L 0–49	75,638	
November 7	Missouri	Folsom Field; Boulder, CO	L 14–30	35,782	
November 14	at Kansas	Memorial Stadium; Lawrence, KS	L 0–27	31,500	
November 21	Kansas State	Folsom Field; Boulder, CO (rivalry)	W 24–21	23,921	
*Non-conference game; ^{†}Homecoming; Rankings from AP Poll released prior to the game

== Roster ==
1981 Colorado Buffaloes football team roster
Players
Coaches
Offense

Pos.	#	Name	Class
QB	13	Steve Vogel	So
QB	16	Randy Essington	So
RB	26	Charles Davis (C)	Sr
FB	42	Willie Beebe	Sr
C	51	Rich Umphrey	Sr
G	63	Vince Rafferty	So
G	66	Doug Krahenbuhl	Sr
OT	74	Bob Sebro	Sr
OT	75	Roger Gunter	Sr
SE	80	Ricky Ward	Sr

Defense

Pos.	#	Name	Class
DB	22	Victor Scott	So
SS	31	Jeff Donaldson	So
LB	59	Mark Remington	Sr
DE	90	Pete Perry	Sr

Special teams

Pos.	#	Name	Class

Head coach

- Chuck Fairbanks (3rd year)

Coordinators/assistant coaches

Legend

- (C) Team captain
- (S) Suspended
- (I) Ineligible
- Injured
- Redshirt

Roster
