= 1981 Iowa State Cyclones football team =

American college football season

1981 Iowa State Cyclones football
- Conference: Big Eight Conference
- Record: 5–5–1 (2–4–1 Big 8)
- Head coach: Donnie Duncan (3rd season)
- Offensive coordinator: Mack Brown (2nd season)
- Home stadium: Cylcone Stadium

1981 Big Eight Conference football standings
	Conf.					Overall
Team	W		L		T	W		L		T
No. 11 Nebraska $	7	–	0	–	0	9	–	3	–	0
No. 20 Oklahoma	4	–	2	–	1	7	–	4	–	1
Kansas	4	–	3	–	0	7	–	5	–	0
Oklahoma State	4	–	3	–	0	7	–	5	–	0
No. 19 Missouri	3	–	4	–	0	8	–	4	–	0
Iowa State	2	–	4	–	1	5	–	5	–	1
Colorado	2	–	5	–	0	3	–	8	–	0
Kansas State	1	–	6	–	0	2	–	9	–	0
$ – Conference champion; Rankings from AP Poll

The 1981 Iowa State Cyclones football team represented Iowa State University as a member of the Big Eight Conference during the 1981 NCAA Division I-A football season. Led by third-year head coach Donnie Duncan, the Cyclones compiled an overall record of 5–5–1 with a mark of 2–4–1 in conference play, placing sixth in the Big 8. Iowa State played home games at Cylcone Stadium in Ames, Iowa.

== Schedule ==
Date	Time	Opponent	Rank	Site	TV	Result	Attendance	Source
September 12	1:30 pm	West Texas State*		Cyclone Stadium; Ames, IA		W 17–13	49,854	
September 19	1:30 pm	Iowa*		Cyclone Stadium; Ames, IA (rivalry)	WOI/WQAD (delay)	W 23–12	53,922	
September 26	1:30 pm	Kent State*		Cyclone Stadium; Ames, IA		W 28–19	50,594	
October 3	1:30 pm	at No. 5 Oklahoma	No. 20	Oklahoma Memorial Stadium; Norman, OK		T 7–7	76,385	
October 10	9:30 pm	at San Diego State*	No. 12	Jack Murphy Stadium; San Diego, CA	WOI	L 31–52	27,561	
October 17	1:30 pm	No. 8 Missouri^{†}		Cyclone Stadium; Ames, IA (rivalry)		W 34–13	53,220	
October 24	1:30 pm	Colorado	No. 14	Cyclone Stadium; Ames, IA		W 17–10	50,103	
October 31	1:30 pm	at Kansas State	No. 11	KSU Stadium; Manhattan, KS (rivalry)		L 7–10	26,650	
November 7	1:30 pm	Kansas		Cyclone Stadium; Ames, IA		L 11–24	49,720	
November 14	1:30 pm	at No. 7 Nebraska		Memorial Stadium; Lincoln, NE (rivalry)		L 7–31	76,258	
November 21	1:35 pm	Oklahoma State		Cyclone Stadium; Ames, IA		L 7–27	46,387	
*Non-conference game; ^{†}Homecoming; Rankings from AP Poll released prior to the game; All times are in Central time

== Roster ==
1981 Iowa State Cyclones football team roster
Players
Coaches
Offense

Pos.	#	Name	Class
RB	45	Dwayne Crutchfield	Sr
TE	88	Dan Johnson	Sr
C	56	Jim Meyer	Jr
QB	14	Ted Meyer	So
OT	74	Scott Nelson	So
OT	69	Karl Nelson	Jr
QB	18	John Quinn	Sr
G	72	Bruce Reimers	So
DT	9	Ernie Thomas	Jr

Defense

Pos.	#	Name	Class
DT	99	Marc Butts	Sr
CB	19	Joe Brown	Sr
FS	44	Jim Laska	Fr
LB	54	Chris Washington	Jr
LB		Jay Niemann	Jr

Special teams

Pos.	#	Name	Class

Head coach

- Donnie Duncan

Coordinators/assistant coaches

Legend

- (C) Team captain
- (S) Suspended
- (I) Ineligible
- Injured
- Redshirt
