= 1981 Oklahoma Sooners football team =

American college football season

1981 Oklahoma Sooners football

Sun Bowl champion

Sun Bowl, W 40–14 vs. Houston
- Conference: Big Eight Conference

Ranking
- Coaches: No. 14
- AP: No. 20
- Record: 7–4–1 (4–2–1 Big 8)
- Head coach: Barry Switzer (9th season)
- Offensive coordinator: Galen Hall (9th season)
- Offensive scheme: Wishbone
- Defensive coordinator: Gary Gibbs (1st season)
- Base defense: 5–2
- Captains: Terry Crouch; Ed Culver; Johnnie Lewis
- Home stadium: Oklahoma Memorial Stadium

1981 Big Eight Conference football standings
	Conf.					Overall
Team	W		L		T	W		L		T
No. 11 Nebraska $	7	–	0	–	0	9	–	3	–	0
No. 20 Oklahoma	4	–	2	–	1	7	–	4	–	1
Kansas	4	–	3	–	0	7	–	5	–	0
Oklahoma State	4	–	3	–	0	7	–	5	–	0
No. 19 Missouri	3	–	4	–	0	8	–	4	–	0
Iowa State	2	–	4	–	1	5	–	5	–	1
Colorado	2	–	5	–	0	3	–	8	–	0
Kansas State	1	–	6	–	0	2	–	9	–	0
$ – Conference champion; Rankings from AP Poll

The 1981 Oklahoma Sooners football team represented the University of Oklahoma during the 1981 NCAA Division I-A football season. They played their home games at Oklahoma Memorial Stadium and competed as members of the Big Eight Conference. They were coached by head coach Barry Switzer. The Sooners defeated the Houston Cougars 40–14 to win the 1981 Sun Bowl in El Paso, Texas.

== Schedule ==
Date	Time	Opponent	Rank	Site	TV	Result	Attendance	Source
September 12		Wyoming*	No. 3	Oklahoma Memorial Stadium; Norman, OK		W 37–20	75,920	
September 26	4:00 p.m.	at No. 1 USC*	No. 2	Los Angeles Memorial Coliseum; Los Angeles, CA	ABC	L 24–28	85,651	
October 3		No. 20 Iowa State	No. 5	Oklahoma Memorial Stadium; Norman, OK		T 7–7	76,385	
October 10	11:30 a.m.	vs. No. 3 Texas*	No. 10	Cotton Bowl; Dallas, TX (rivalry)	ABC	L 14–34	75,587	
October 17		Kansas		Oklahoma Memorial Stadium; Norman, OK		W 45–7	75,644	
October 24		Oregon State*		Oklahoma Memorial Stadium; Norman, OK		W 42–3	75,658	
October 31		Colorado	No. 19	Oklahoma Memorial Stadium; Norman, OK		W 49–0	75,638	
November 7		at Kansas State	No. 17	KSU Stadium; Manhattan, KS		W 28–21	33,200	
November 14		at Missouri	No. 15	Faurot Field; Columbia, MO (rivalry)		L 14–19	67,364	
November 21		No. 5 Nebraska		Oklahoma Memorial Stadium; Norman, OK (rivalry)	ESPN	L 14–37	75,833	
November 28		at Oklahoma State		Lewis Field; Stillwater, OK (Bedlam Series)	KTUL	W 27–3	51,100	
December 26	12:00 p.m.	vs. Houston*		Sun Bowl; El Paso, TX (Sun Bowl)	CBS	W 40–14	33,816	
*Non-conference game; Rankings from AP Poll released prior to the game; All times are in Central time

== Roster ==
1981 Oklahoma Sooners football team roster
Players
Coaches
Offense

Pos.	#	Name	Class
C	51	Bill Bechtold	Sr
QB	1	Danny Bradley	Fr
RB	30	Donald Brown	Fr
G	75	Terry Crouch (C)	Sr
OT	61	Ed Culver (C)	Sr
OT	70	Scott Leggett	Fr
QB	7	Kelly Phelps	Jr
RB	4	Buster Rhymes	Fr
SE	2	Jim Rockford	So
RB	13	Steve Sewell	Fr
FB	23	Fred Sims	Fr
QB	8	Darrell Shepard	Sr
C	73	Chuck Thomas	So
G	76	Steve Williams	Jr
RB	32	Stanley Wilson	Jr
RB	40	Chet Winters	Jr

Defense

Pos.	#	Name	Class
DB	31	Allen Anderson	Fr
LB	38	Thomas Benson	So
DL	90	John Blake	Jr
DT	80	Rick Bryan	So
DL	92	Tony Casillas	Fr
DT	78	Scott Dawson	Sr
DB	33	Dwight Drane	So
DB	6	Steve Haworth	Jr
NG	95	Johnnie Lewis (C)	Sr
LB	39	Kevin Murphy	Fr
DE	41	Mike Rilley	Sr
LB	49	Jackie Shipp	So
DB	15	Elbert Watts	Fr
DE	88	Mike Weddington	Jr

Special teams

Pos.	#	Name	Class

Head coach

- Barry Switzer

Coordinators/assistant coaches

- Gary Gibbs (DC)
- Galen Hall (OC)
- Warren Harper (LB)
- Merv Johnson (OL)
- Wendell Mosley (RB)
- Rex Norris (AHC)
- Lucious Selmon (DL)

Legend

- (C) Team captain
- (S) Suspended
- (I) Ineligible
- Injured
- Redshirt

Roster

== Game summaries ==
=== Oklahoma State ===
Oklahoma Sooners at Oklahoma State Cowboys

Quarter	1	2	3	4	Total
Oklahoma	7	13	7	0	27
Oklahoma State	0	3	0	0	3

at Lewis Field • Stillwater, Oklahoma

- Date: November 28
- Game attendance: 51,100
- TV: KTUL
- SoonerStats.com

Fred Sims scored three short-yardage touchdowns to lead Oklahoma to a 27–3 win over their instate rivals in a steady drizzle. Sims, who carried 23 times for 66 yards, scored on runs of two and five yards in the second quarter and a one-yard run in the third.

== Rankings ==
Ranking movements Legend: ██ Increase in ranking ██ Decrease in ranking — = Not ranked ( ) = First-place votes
	Week														
Poll	Pre	1	2	3	4	5	6	7	8	9	10	11	12	13	Final
AP	2 (7)	3	3 (12)	2 (15)	5	10	—	—	19	17	15	—	—	—	20
Coaches Poll	2 (3)	2 (3)	3 (14)	2 (10)	6	12	20	17	13	13	11	—	—	—	14

== Postseason ==
=== NFL draft ===
The following players were drafted into the National Football League following the season.

Round	Pick	Player	Position	NFL team
3	67	Bill Bechtold	Center	Los Angeles Rams
5	113	Terry Crouch	Guard	Baltimore Colts
8	207	Mike Reilly	Linebacker	Los Angeles Rams
9	241	Lyndle Byford	Tackle	Kansas City Chiefs
