= 1981 Tulsa Golden Hurricane football team =

American college football season

1981 Tulsa Golden Hurricane football

MVC co-champion
- Conference: Missouri Valley Conference
- Record: 6–5 (5–1 MVC)
- Head coach: John Cooper (5th season)
- Offensive coordinator: Larry Coker (2nd season)
- Defensive coordinator: Mike Knoll (2nd season)
- Home stadium: Skelly Stadium

1981 Missouri Valley Conference football standings
	Conf.					Overall
Team	W		L		T	W		L		T
Drake +	5	–	1	–	0	10	–	1	–	0
Tulsa +	5	–	1	–	0	6	–	5	–	0
Southern Illinois	5	–	2	–	0	7	–	4	–	0
West Texas State	3	–	3	–	0	7	–	4	–	0
Wichita State	3	–	3	–	1	4	–	6	–	1
Indiana State	2	–	4	–	1	5	–	5	–	1
New Mexico State	1	–	5	–	0	3	–	8	–	0
Illinois State	0	–	5	–	0	3	–	7	–	0
+ – Conference co-champions

The 1981 Tulsa Golden Hurricane football team represented the University of Tulsa during the 1981 NCAA Division I-A football season. In their fifth year under head coach John Cooper, the Golden Hurricane compiled a 6–5 record (5–1 against conference opponents) and tied for the Missouri Valley Conference championship.

The team's statistical leaders included quarterback Kenny Jackson with 806 passing yards, Brett White with 640 rushing yards, and John Green with 252 receiving yards. Head coach John Cooper was later inducted into the College Football Hall of Fame.

== Schedule ==
Date	Opponent	Site	Result	Attendance	Source
September 5	Kansas*	Skelly Stadium; Tulsa, OK	L 11–15	36,824	
September 12	at Arkansas*	Razorback Stadium; Fayetteville, AR	L 10–14	42,118	
September 19	Oklahoma State*	Lewis Field; Stillwater, OK (rivalry)	L 21–23	47,000	
September 26	Southern Illinois^{†}	Skelly Stadium; Tulsa, OK	L 34–36	18,943	
October 3	Kansas State*	Skelly Stadium; Tulsa, OK	W 35–21	18,196	
October 17	at Indiana State	Memorial Stadium; Terre Haute, IN	W 20–19	5,293	
October 24	Wichita State	Skelly Stadium; Tulsa, OK	W 52–21	17,022	
October 31	Drake	Skelly Stadium; Tulsa, OK	W 59–6	19,741	
November 7	New Mexico State	Skelly Stadium; Tulsa, OK	W 31–0	23,621	
November 14	at West Texas State	Kimbrough Memorial Stadium; Canyon, TX	W 24–10	8,300	
November 21	at Arkansas State*	Indian Stadium; Jonesboro, AR	L 7–31	10,419	
*Non-conference game; ^{†}Homecoming

== Roster ==
1981 Tulsa Golden Hurricane football team roster
Players			Coaches
Offense: Pos. / # / Name / Class; RB / 5 / Ken Lacy / Jr	Defense: Pos. / # / Name / Class; DE / 14 / Eugene Williams / Sr	Special teams: Pos. / # / Name / Class	Head coach: John Cooper; Coordinators/assistant coaches: Joe Hollis (Tight ends and offensive tackles); Legend: (C) Team captain; (S) Suspended; (I) Ineligible; Injured; Redshirt

== After the season ==
=== 1982 NFL draft ===
The following Golden Hurricane players were selected in the 1982 NFL draft following the season.

Round	Pick	Player	Position	NFL club
7	174	Eugene Williams	Linebacker	Seattle Seahawks
7	193	Bill Purifoy	Defensive end	Dallas Cowboys
