= 1981 Western Illinois Leathernecks football team =

American college football season

1981 Western Illinois Leathernecks football

Mid-Con co-champion
- Conference: Association of Mid-Continent Universities
- Record: 5–6 (2–1 Mid-Con)
- Head coach: Pete Rodriguez (3rd season)
- Home stadium: Hanson Field

1981 Association of Mid-Continent Universities football standings
	Conf.					Overall
Team	W		L		T	W		L		T
Northern Iowa +	2	–	1	–	0	7	–	4	–	0
Eastern Illinois +	2	–	1	–	0	6	–	5	–	0
Western Illinois +	2	–	1	–	0	5	–	6	–	0
Southwest Missouri State	0	–	3	–	0	3	–	5	–	2
+ – Conference co-champions

The 1981 Western Illinois Leathernecks football team represented Western Illinois University as a member of the Association of Mid-Continent Universities during the 1981 NCAA Division I-AA football season. They were led by third-year head coach Pete Rodriguez and played their home games at Hanson Field. The Leathernecks finished the season with a 5–6 record overall and a 2–1 record in conference play, making them conference co-champions with Eastern Illinois and Northern Iowa.

== Schedule ==
Date	Opponent	Site	Result	Attendance	Source
September 5	at Illinois State*	Hancock Stadium; Normal, IL	L 7–31	9,179	
September 12	South Dakota State*	Hanson Field; Macomb, IL	W 17–13		
September 19	at Drake*	Drake Stadium; Des Moines, IA	L 6–21	10,185	
September 26	Southwest Missouri State	Hanson Field; Macomb, IL	W 19–7	9,003	
October 3	at Northeast Missouri State*	Stokes Stadium; Kirksville, MO	W 17–7		
October 10	Northern Iowa	Hanson Field; Macomb, IL	W 21–14	6,200	
October 17	at Eastern Illinois	O'Brien Field; Charleston, IL	L 8–20	5,000	
October 24	No. 2 Northern Michigan*	Hanson Field; Macomb, IL	L 14–28	11,794	
October 31	at New Mexico State*	Aggie Memorial Stadium; Las Cruces, NM	L 24–31		
November 7	at Youngstown State*	Rayen Stadium; Youngstown, OH	L 22–34		
November 14	Howard*	Hanson Stadium; Macomb, IL	W 20–17		
*Non-conference game; Rankings from NCAA Division II Football Committee Poll released prior to the game
