= 1981 Wichita State Shockers football team =

American college football season

1981 Wichita State Shockers football
- Conference: Missouri Valley Conference
- Record: 4–6–1 (3–3–1 MVC)
- Head coach: Willie Jeffries (3rd season)
- Offensive coordinator: Larry Beckish
- Defensive coordinator: Ben Blacknall (3rd season)
- Home stadium: Cessna Stadium

1981 Missouri Valley Conference football standings
	Conf.					Overall
Team	W		L		T	W		L		T
Drake +	5	–	1	–	0	10	–	1	–	0
Tulsa +	5	–	1	–	0	6	–	5	–	0
Southern Illinois	5	–	2	–	0	7	–	4	–	0
West Texas State	3	–	3	–	0	7	–	4	–	0
Wichita State	3	–	3	–	1	4	–	6	–	1
Indiana State	2	–	4	–	1	5	–	5	–	1
New Mexico State	1	–	5	–	0	3	–	8	–	0
Illinois State	0	–	5	–	0	3	–	7	–	0
+ – Conference co-champions

The 1981 Wichita State Shockers football team was an American football team that represented Wichita State as a member of the Missouri Valley Conference during the 1981 NCAA Division I-A football season. In their third year under head coach Willie Jeffries, the team compiled a 4–6–1 record.

== Schedule ==
Date	Opponent	Site	Result	Attendance	Source
September 5	Missouri Southern*	Cessna Stadium; Wichita, KS	W 38–6	19,541	
September 12	at Southern Illinois	McAndrew Stadium; Carbondale, IL	W 13–7	9,500	
September 19	at No. 18 Arizona State*	Sun Devil Stadium; Tempe, AZ	L 21–33	61,100	
September 26	at Indiana State	Memorial Stadium; Terre Haute, IN	T 14–14	12,283	
October 3	at New Mexico State	Aggie Memorial Stadium; Las Cruces, NM	W 24–20	14,255	
October 10	Drake	Cessna Stadium; Wichita, KS	L 23–24	24,914	
October 17	West Texas State	Cessna Stadium; Wichita, KS	L 17–23	17,000	
October 24	at Tulsa	Skelly Stadium; Tulsa, OK	L 21–52	17,022	
October 31	Illinois State	Cessna Stadium; Wichita, KS	W 38–7	8,120	
November 7	at Tennessee*	Neyland Stadium; Knoxville, TN	L 21–24	94,155	
November 14	No. 2 (D-II) Northern Michigan*	Cessna Stadium; Wichita, KS	L 30–32	7,103	
*Non-conference game; Rankings from AP Poll released prior to the game
