= 1981 Northern Iowa Panthers football team =

American college football season

1981 Northern Iowa Panthers football

Mid-Con co-champion
- Conference: Association of Mid-Continent Universities
- Record: 5–6 (2–1 Mid-Con)
- Head coach: Stan Sheriff (22nd season)
- Defensive coordinator: Dennis Remmert (11th season)
- Home stadium: UNI-Dome

1981 Association of Mid-Continent Universities football standings
	Conf.					Overall
Team	W		L		T	W		L		T
Northern Iowa +	2	–	1	–	0	5	–	6	–	0
Eastern Illinois +	2	–	1	–	0	6	–	5	–	0
Western Illinois +	2	–	1	–	0	5	–	6	–	0
Southwest Missouri State	0	–	3	–	0	3	–	5	–	2
+ – Conference co-champions

The 1981 Northern Iowa Panthers football team was an American football team that represented the University of Northern Iowa as a member of the Association of Mid-Continent Universities (Mid-Con) during the 1981 NCAA Division I-AA football season. In its 22nd season under head coach Stan Sheriff, the team compiled a 5–6 record (2–1 in conference games) and tied for the Mid-Con championship.

Quarterback Steve Sandon tallied 24 passing touchdowns but also set a school single-season record (still standing as of 2026) with 26 passes intercepted, and was selected as Northern Iowa's player of the year. Five Northern Iowa players received first-team honors on the 1981 all-Mid-Con football team: Sandon; split end Ken Harvey; offensive tackle Roger Schultz; kicker Steve Schonert; and weak safety John Root. Four others were named to the second team. Harvey set school single-season records for receptions (78), receiving yards (1,161), and receiving touchdowns (15). Joe Anderson set a school record (still intact) with 25 tackles against Idaho; he also set a school single-season record (since broken) with 170 total tackles in 1981. Don Stewart led the team with seven interceptions.

The team played its home games at the UNI-Dome in Cedar Falls, Iowa.

== Schedule ==
Date	Opponent	Site	Result	Attendance	Source
September 5	Drake*	UNI-Dome; Cedar Falls, IA	L 30–39		
September 12	Grand Valley State*	UNI-Dome; Cedar Falls, IA	W 21–20	12,083	
September 19	at Idaho*	Kibbie Dome; Moscow, ID	L 10–59	12,000	
September 26	at Montana*	Dornblaser Field; Missoula, MT	L 21–42	8,281	
October 3	No. 2 Northern Michigan*	UNI-Dome; Cedar Falls, IA	L 13–17	12,317	
October 10	at Western Illinois	Hanson Field; Macomb, IL	L 13–17	6,200	
October 24	at Southwest Missouri State	Briggs Stadium; Springfield, MO	W 20–17		
October 31	Eastern Illinois	UNI-Dome; Cedar Falls, IA	W 38–17		
November 7	Nebraska–Omaha*	UNI-Dome; Cedar Falls, IA	W 42–13		
November 14	at South Dakota*	DakotaDome; Vermillion, SD	L 17–34		
November 21	Youngstown State*	UNI-Dome; Cedar Falls, IA	W 45–43		
*Non-conference game; Rankings from NCAA Division II Football Committee Poll released prior to the game
