= 1981 Tangerine Bowl =

American college football game

Missouri Tigers	Southern Miss Golden Eagles
(7–4)	(9–1–1)
Big Eight	Independent
19	17
Head coach: Warren Powers	Head coach: Bobby Collins
	AP / Coaches; 18 / 15
	1	2	3	4	Total
Missouri	7	6	3	3	19
Southern Miss	0	3	7	7	17
- Date: December 19, 1981
- Season: 1981
- Stadium: Orlando Stadium
- Location: Orlando, Florida
- MVP: LB Jeff Gaylord (Missouri)
- Referee: William McDonald
- Attendance: 50,045

United States TV coverage
- Network: Mizlou

The 1981 Tangerine Bowl was an American college football bowl game played on December 19, 1981, at Orlando Stadium in Orlando, Florida. The game featured the Southern Miss Golden Eagles and the Missouri Tigers.

== Background ==
Southern Miss had finished with 9 wins in the regular season, their most since 1962 in their second straight bowl appearance, their first consecutive bowl seasons since 1957–58. Missouri had finished 5th in the Big Eight Conference, qualifying for their 4th straight bowl appearance. This was the first Tangerine Bowl for Southern Miss since 1958. This was Missouri's first ever Tangerine Bowl.

== Game summary ==
Bobby Meyer gave the Tigers a 7–0 lead on his three-yard touchdown run in the first quarter. The Golden Eagles narrowed the lead to 7–3 on a Steve Clark field goal. Missouri increased their lead with two Bob Lucchesi field goals in the span of 5 minutes to make it 13–3 at halftime. Sammy Winder made it 13–10 on his 4-yard touchdown run in the middle of the third quarter. Lucchesi made it 16–10 on his 30-yard field goal in the third quarter. He added another one from 28 yards out to make it 19–10. Southern Miss narrowed it to 19–17 with 1:03 remaining on a David Sellers touchdown pass to Louis Lipps.

== Aftermath ==
Head Coach Bobby Collins left for SMU after the game, and the Eagles did not return to a bowl game until 1988. Southern Miss has not played in the Tangerine (now Citrus) bowl since. Missouri did not return until 2015.

== Statistics ==
Statistics	Southern Miss	Missouri
First downs	15	15
Yards rushing	133	128
Yards passing	128	141
Total Offense	261	305
Return yards	122	97
Punts-Average	8-34.5	7-35.9
Fumbles-Lost	2-1	1–0
Interceptions Thrown	0	1
Penalties-Yards	6-58	7-50
