= 1981 Nebraska Cornhuskers football team =

American college football season

1981 Nebraska Cornhuskers football

Big Eight champion

Orange Bowl, L 15–22 vs. Clemson
- Conference: Big Eight Conference

Ranking
- Coaches: No. 9
- AP: No. 11
- Record: 9–3 (7–0 Big Eight)
- Head coach: Tom Osborne (9th season)
- Offensive scheme: I formation
- Defensive coordinator: Charlie McBride (1st season)
- Base defense: 5–2
- Home stadium: Memorial Stadium

1981 Big Eight Conference football standings
	Conf.					Overall
Team	W		L		T	W		L		T
No. 11 Nebraska $	7	–	0	–	0	9	–	3	–	0
No. 20 Oklahoma	4	–	2	–	1	7	–	4	–	1
Kansas	4	–	3	–	0	7	–	5	–	0
Oklahoma State	4	–	3	–	0	7	–	5	–	0
No. 19 Missouri	3	–	4	–	0	8	–	4	–	0
Iowa State	2	–	4	–	1	5	–	5	–	1
Colorado	2	–	5	–	0	3	–	8	–	0
Kansas State	1	–	6	–	0	2	–	9	–	0
$ – Conference champion; Rankings from AP Poll

The 1981 Nebraska Cornhuskers football team represented the University of Nebraska–Lincoln in the 1981 NCAA Division I-A football season. The team was coached by Tom Osborne and played their home games in Memorial Stadium in Lincoln, Nebraska.

== Schedule ==
Date	Time	Opponent	Rank	Site	TV	Result	Attendance	Source
September 12	1:05 pm	at Iowa*	No. 7	Kinnick Stadium; Iowa City, IA (rivalry)		L 7–10	60,160	
September 19	1:30 pm	No. 19 Florida State*	No. 17	Memorial Stadium; Lincoln, NE		W 34–14	76,289	
September 26	1:30 pm	No. 3 Penn State*	No. 15	Memorial Stadium; Lincoln, NE		L 24–30	76,308	
October 3	1:30 pm	Auburn*		Memorial Stadium; Lincoln, NE		W 17–3	76,423	
October 10	1:30 pm	Colorado		Memorial Stadium; Lincoln, NE (rivalry)		W 59–0	76,169	
October 17	1:30 pm	at Kansas State	No. 19	KSU Stadium; Manhattan, KS (rivalry)		W 49–3	45,915	
October 24	11:50 am	at No. 19 Missouri	No. 15	Faurot Field; Columbia, MO (rivalry)	ABC	W 6–0	72,001	
October 31	1:30 pm	Kansas^{†}	No. 12	Memorial Stadium; Lincoln, NE (rivalry)		W 31–15	76,208	
November 7	11:30 am	at Oklahoma State	No. 11	Lewis Field; Stillwater, OK	ABC	W 54–7	48,500	
November 14	1:30 pm	Iowa State	No. 7	Memorial Stadium; Lincoln, NE (rivalry)		W 31–7	76,258	
November 21	1:30 pm	at Oklahoma	No. 5	Oklahoma Memorial Stadium; Norman, OK (rivalry)	ESPN	W 37–14	74,807	
January 1, 1982	7:00 pm	vs. No. 1 Clemson*	No. 4	Miami Orange Bowl; Miami, FL (Orange Bowl)	NBC	L 15–22	72,748	
*Non-conference game; ^{†}Homecoming; Rankings from AP Poll released prior to the game; All times are in Central time

== Roster ==
Abbott, Todd (So.) DE; Alberico, Tim (So.) SE; Bachman, Ron (So.) DT; Barnes, Ed #57 (So.) LB; Bates, Phil #43 (Sr.) FB; Bauer, Steve #94 (So.) MON; Behning, Mark (So.) OT; Bess, Donnie #44 (Jr.) LB; Bourn, Don (So.) TE; Brandl, Matt #58 (Sr.) OG; Brown, Steve #95 (So.) DE; Brown, Todd #29 (Jr.) SE; Brungardt, Tim #32 (So.) IB; Buchanan, Eric (So.) DE; Campbell, Grant #24 (Jr.) P Carlstrom, Tom #78 (Sr.) OG; Chandler, Rick #39 (So.) LB; Clark, Bret #10 (So.) S Corbeil, Jim #92 (So.) LB; Craig, Roger #21 (Jr.) IB; Curry, Tom #1 (So.) WB; Damkroger, Steve #35 (Jr.) LB; Daum, Mark (So.) LB; DeBus, Robert (So.) LB; Dhein, Doug (So.) OT; Engebritson, Monte #83 (So.) TE; Evans, Brent #48 (Jr.) LB; Felici, Tony #46 (Jr.) DE; Fischer, Dan #26 (Jr.) S Fryar, Irving #27 (So.) WB; Gdowski, Tom #93 (Jr.) DT; Gill, Turner #12 (So.) QB; Glathar, Kurt #69 (Jr.) OG; Graeber, Ken (So.) MG; Greene, Ricky (So.) IB; Grimminger, Harry (So.) OG; Haase, David #4 (So.) S Hagerman, Mark #9 (Jr.) PK; Hansman, Bob #98 (So.) LB; Harris, Neil #11 (So.) CB; Haywood, Calvin (So.) MON; Heath, John #52 (So.) LB; Herrmann, Doug #63 (So.) DT; Hill, Dan #84 (Jr.) TE; Hill, Pete #41 (Fr.) FB; Hinds, Tom (Jr.) OG	Hineline, Curt #59 (Sr.) MG; Hoback, Rob (Jr.) LB; Holbrook, Tim #23 (Jr.) MON; Huebert, Randy #31 (Sr.) WB; Hurley, Dan #73 (Sr.) OT; Iodence, Brian #14 (Sr.) CB; Jeffries, Jim (So.) MON; Johnson, Brad #55 (Jr.) C Kammerer, Kyle (So.) OG; Keeler, Mike #61 (So.) DT; Kimball, Scott (So.) SE; Knox, Mike #44 (Fr.) LB; Kramer, Brian (So.) OG; Krejci, Jeff #2 (Sr.) S Krenk, Mitch #89 (Jr.) TE; Kwapick, Jeff #70 (Jr.) OT; Larsen, Pat #3 (Jr.) CB; Lewis, Rodney #5 (Sr.) CB; Lindquist, Ric #15 (Sr.) CB; Lindstrom, Scott #56 (Jr.) MG; Lonowski, Jack #67 (Sr.) DT; Lyday, Allen #18 (Jr.) CB; Mandelko, Mike #68 (Jr.) OG; Mann, Ricky #16 (So.) S Mason, Nate #8 (Jr.) QB; Mathison, Bruce #19 (Jr.) QB; Mauer, Mark #17 (Sr.) QB; McCashland, Mike (So.) MON; McCowan, Randy #37 (Jr.) IB; McElroy, Mike #54 (Sr.) C McLaughlin, Scott (So.) C McWhirter, Steve #45 (Jr.) LB; Merrell, Jeff #74 (Jr.) MG; Moravec, Mark #40 (Jr.) FB; Muehling, Brad #53 (So.) C Murphy, Jim (So.) DB; Neil, Eddie #13 (Jr.) PK; Nelson, Randy (So.) OT; Orton, Greg (So.) OG; Patterson, Bill (So.) IB; Petersen, Tim (So.) CB; Praeuner, Wade #85 (So.) DE; Raridon, Scott #72 (So.) OT; Reinhardt, John (So.) MG; Ridder, Dave #86 (So.) DE; Rimington, Dave #50 (Jr.) C	Ripa, Dan (So.) FB; Rogan, Dennis #42 (So.) IB; Rozier, Mike #30 (So.) IB; Santin, John #36 (Jr.) LB; Schaffer, Scott (So.) WB; Schmuecker, Dan #77 (So.) OT; Schoening, Lynn #91 (Jr.) PK; Sculley, Mike #51 (Sr.) MG; Seibel, Kevin #49 (Jr.) PK; Schark, Doug (So.) TE; Sherlock, John #66 (So.) OT; Simmons, Ricky #7 (Jr.) WB; Sims, Sammy #6 (Sr.) MON; Smail, Bob #47 (Sr.) MG; Smith, Jeff #28 (So.) IB; Smith, Paul #25 (Jr.) FB; Sorenson, John (So.) SE; Spratte, Todd #81 (So.) DE; Steels, Anthony #33 (Sr.) WB; Steinkuhler, Dean #71 (So.) OG; Stephens, Greg #82 (Jr.) TE; Stromath, Dave #99 (Sr.) DT; Stuckey, Rob (So.) DT; Sundberg, Craig (So.) QB; Theiss, Randy #65 (Jr.) OT; Thomas, Anthony (So.) OG; Thompson, Jim (So.) WB; Tramner, Mike #64 (So.) MG; Traynowicz, Mark (So.) OT; Valla, Ronald (So.) PK; Van Lent, Bill #90 (Jr.) DT; Van Norman, Kris #38 (Jr.) MON; Vergith, Tom #22 (Jr.) SE; Waechter, Henry #75 (Sr.) DT; Waechter, Kevin #76 (Jr.) DT; Walton, Jerry (So.) S Weber, Bill #87 (So.) DE; Weed, Dan (So.) C Wees, Dennis #62 (Jr.) MG Wilkening, Doug #34 (So.) FB; Williams, Jamie #80 (Jr.) TE; Williams, Jimmy #96 (Sr.) DE; Williams, Toby #97 (Jr.) DT; Woodard, Scott #88 (Sr.) SE; Zierke, Mike (So.) DT

=== Depth chart ===
Defense

FS
Jeff Krejci
Tim Holbrook
Dan Fischer

INSIDE	INSIDE
Bret Evans	Steve Damkroger
Steve McWhirter	Mike Knox
Todd Spratte	⋅

MONSTER BACK
Sammy Sims
Kris Van-Norman
Tim Holbrook

CB
Rodney Lewis
Brian Iodence
Eddie Hollins

DE	DT	NT	DT	DE
Tony Felici	Henry Waechter	Jeff Merrell	Toby Williams	Jimmy Williams
Dave Ridder	Doug Herrman	Curt Hineline	Tom Gdowski	Bill Weber
Eric Buchanan	Dave Stromath	Scott Lindstrom	Mike Keeler	Wade Praeuner

CB
Ric Lindquist
Allen Lyday
Jim Murphy

Offense

SE
Todd Brown
Scott Woodard
Tom Vergith

LT	LG	C	RG	RT
Randy Theiss	Mike Mandelko	Dave Rimington	Tom Carlstrom	Dan Hurley
Jeff Kwapick	Dean Steinkuhler	Brad Johnson	Kurt Glather	Scott Raridon
John Sherlock	Matt Brandl	Mike McElroy	Scott McLaughlin	Mark Behning

TE
Jamie Williams
Mitch Krenk
Dan Hill

WB
Anthony Steels
Irving Fryar
Tom Curry

QB
Turner Gill
Mark Mauer
Nate Mason
Bruce Mathison

FB
Phil Bates
Doug Wilkeing
Mark Moravec

Special teams
PK Kevin Seibel
P Grant Campbell

RB
Mike Rozier
Roger Craig
Tim Brungardt
⋅

== Coaching staff ==
Name	Title	First year in this position	Years at Nebraska	Alma mater
Tom Osborne	Head Coach; Offensive coordinator	1973	1964–1997	Hastings College
Charlie McBride	Defensive line	1981	1977–1999	Colorado
Cletus Fischer	Offensive line		1960–1985	Nebraska
John Melton	Linebackers	1973	1962–1988	Wyoming
Mike Corgan	Running backs	1962	1962–1982	Notre Dame
Boyd Epley	Head Strength Coach	1969	1969–2003	Nebraska
George Darlington	Defensive ends		1973–2002	Rutgers
Milt Tenopir	Offensive line	1974	1974–2002	Sterling
Gene Huey	Receivers	1977	1977–1986	Wyoming
Frank Solich	Head Freshman Coach	1979	1979–2003	Nebraska
Jack Pierce			1979–1991	
Jerry Pettibone	Recruiting Coordinator	1980	1980–1981	Oregon State
Bob Thornton	Secondary	1981	1981–1985	Nebraska

== Game summaries ==
=== Iowa ===
#7 Nebraska at Iowa [box score]

Team	1	2	3	4	Total
#7 Nebraska	0	0	0	7	7
• Iowa	7	3	0	0	10

- Date: 1981-09-12
- Location: Kinnick Stadium, Iowa City, Iowa
- Game attendance: 60,160

Unranked Iowa jumped out to 10–0 lead by halftime on their way to paying back the 0–57 defeat handed to them by the Cornhuskers last year, and Nebraska was unable to answer in kind. Three 4th quarter Nebraska forays into Hawkeye territory produced no points, and an Iowa interception with 39 seconds remaining closed the book on the upset. Iowa went on to play in the Rose Bowl.

=== Florida State ===
#19 Florida State at #17 Nebraska [box score]

Team	1	2	3	4	Total
#19 Florida State	0	7	0	7	14
• #17 Nebraska	10	0	14	10	34

- Date: 1981-09-19
- Location: Memorial Stadium, Lincoln, Nebraska
- Game attendance: 76,289

Nebraska held a close 10–7 lead at halftime, but the momentum quickly turned in favor of the Cornhuskers when WB Irving Fryar scored on an 82-yard punt return, followed up six game clock seconds later when DE Tony Felici's off-the-bench opportunity allowed him to recover a Florida State fumble on the kickoff and return it 13 yards for another touchdown. Nebraska sealed the deal on a 94-yard touchdown run by IB Roger Craig, tying the standing Nebraska record. Felici's defensive performance earned him the starting position.

=== Penn State ===
#3 Penn State at #15 Nebraska [box score]

Team	1	2	3	4	Total
• #3 Penn State	3	14	3	10	30
#15 Nebraska	0	10	14	0	24

- Date: 1981-09-26
- Location: Memorial Stadium, Lincoln, Nebraska
- Game attendance: 76,308

No major records fell on this day, as each team fought to overcome the other and the scoring lead was exchanged five times. Penn State running back and future NFL star Curt Warner rolled up 238 yards, nearly matching the entire Nebraska team ground production. Penn State pulled ahead on an early 4th-quarter touchdown and added a field goal with 4:54 remaining to extend their lead to 6 points, and the Cornhuskers were unable to muster a response before time expired. Nebraska fell out of the rankings for the first time since a one-week absence early in the 1977 season.

=== Auburn ===
Auburn at Nebraska [box score]

Team	1	2	3	4	Total
Auburn	3	0	0	0	3
• Nebraska	0	0	10	7	17

- Date: 1981-10-03
- Location: Memorial Stadium, Lincoln, Nebraska
- Game attendance: 76,423

Auburn put up a 1st-quarter field goal to take the lead, and the score remained 3–0 at halftime. Through the course of the game, however, Auburn coughed up 10 fumbles, losing half of them, and never scored again. Nebraska quarterback Turner Gill took over after halftime, and with help from the turnovers, Nebraska overcome the weight of their worst season start since 1960 and put up 17 points in the second half to even up their season record at 2–2.

=== Colorado ===
Colorado at Nebraska [box score]

Team	1	2	3	4	Total
Colorado	0	0	0	0	0
• Nebraska	14	24	21	0	59

- Date: 1981-10-10
- Location: Memorial Stadium, Lincoln, Nebraska
- Game attendance: 76,169

This game marked the first start for Nebraska QB Turner Gill and IB Mike Rozier, and the Cornhuskers finally came to life. Gill tied an existing Nebraska record by passing for four touchdowns, as Nebraska piled up 719 offensive yards and set a new NCAA record with 42 first downs while racking up all 59 points before the start of the 4th quarter, while the Blackshirts posted their first shutout of the season.

=== Kansas State ===
#19 Nebraska at Kansas State [box score]

Team	1	2	3	4	Total
• #19 Nebraska	14	14	0	21	49
Kansas State	0	0	3	0	3

- Date: 1981-10-17
- Location: KSU Stadium, Manhattan, Kansas
- Game attendance: 76,169

Entering the game, the Huskers were ranked #19 in the AP poll, beginning an NCAA-record streak of 348 consecutive appearances in the AP rankings. For the third straight game, the Nebraska defense prevented a touchdown, as the Cornhuskers rolled up 674 offensive yards and handled Kansas State with ease, showing that the return of Nebraska to the rankings at #19 was appropriate. Despite recovering three of eight Nebraska fumbles and the opportunity to capitalize accordingly, the Wildcats still managed only 8 first downs, and they barely avoided the shutout with a single 3rd-quarter field goal.

=== Missouri ===
#15 Nebraska at #19 Missouri [box score]

Team	1	2	3	4	Total
• #15 Nebraska	0	0	0	6	6
#19 Missouri	0	0	0	0	0

- Date: 1981-10-24
- Location: Faurot Field, Columbia, Missouri
- Game attendance: 72,001

This slugfest of two nearly evenly ranked teams contained plenty of action if not points, as the stalemate dragged on until time nearly ran out. Finally, with just 23 seconds left in the 4th quarter, Nebraska FB Phil Bates punched a three-yard run into the end zone. Like all the other scoring attempts preceding the eventual touchdown, even the PAT failed, and Nebraska departed Columbia with the 6–0 win.

=== Kansas ===
Kansas at #12 Nebraska [box score]

Team	1	2	3	4	Total
Kansas	3	6	3	3	15
• #12 Nebraska	0	3	14	14	31

- Date: 1981-10-31
- Location: Memorial Stadium, Lincoln, Nebraska
- Game attendance: 76,208

The Blackshirts extended their touchdown-prevention streak to five games, yet Nebraska was still behind 9–3 at halftime due to the prolific field goal production from Kansas PK Bruce Kallmeyer. Adjustments made during the break had an immediate effect, however, and despite Kallmeyer putting two more kicks between the uprights, the Cornhusker offense ran off four touchdowns with the help of IB Mike Rozier's career-best 179 yards to pull away.

=== Oklahoma State ===
#11 Nebraska at Oklahoma State [box score]

Team	1	2	3	4	Total
• #11 Nebraska	17	0	28	9	54
Oklahoma State	0	0	7	0	7

- Date: 1981-11-07
- Location: Lewis Field, Stillwater, Oklahoma
- Game attendance: 48,500

The high-flying Oklahoma State defense, ranked #1 in the nation when the Cornhuskers rolled into town, were obliterated by Nebraska's 546 yards of offense. Nebraska QB Turner Gill led his squad to scores on their first three possessions, and handed over the controls shortly after halftime, but the Cornhuskers continued to score with ease. The Nebraska defense allowed just one score, a 3rd-quarter touchdown, which ended their touchdown-free streak at 22 quarters.

=== Iowa State ===
Iowa State at #7 Nebraska [box score]

Team	1	2	3	4	Total
Iowa State	0	7	0	0	7
• #7 Nebraska	0	7	0	24	31

- Date: 1981-11-14
- Location: Memorial Stadium, Lincoln, Nebraska
- Game attendance: 76,258

The Cornhuskers struggled to put Iowa State behind them, catching up with them to enter halftime tied at 7, and it wasn't until the 4th quarter that the worn-down Cyclones allowed a 63-yard punt return touchdown by WB Irving Fryar as they gave up 24 unanswered points to decide the outcome. However, Nebraska QB Turner Gill suffered a leg injury that eventually became serious enough to cause nerve damage, putting him out for the rest of the season and also casting a shadow over his athletic future.

=== Oklahoma ===
#5 Nebraska at Oklahoma [box score]

Team	1	2	3	4	Total
• #5 Nebraska	10	14	10	3	37
Oklahoma	7	0	7	0	14

- Date: 1981-11-21
- Location: Oklahoma Memorial Stadium, Norman, Oklahoma
- Game attendance: 74,807

Oklahoma started out strong but failed to produce points to match their ability to march down the field, hampered by losing 3 of 5 fumbles over the course of the game. Despite the early concern, the Sooners went to the locker room at the half trailing 24–7 after a successful campaign by backup Nebraska QB Mark Mauer, and Oklahoma was never able to recover. Nebraska finished with an unbeaten conference slate and headed to Miami as conference champions.

=== Clemson ===
#4 Nebraska vs #1 Clemson [box score]

Team	1	2	3	4	Total
#4 Nebraska	7	0	0	8	15
• #1 Clemson	6	6	10	0	22

- Date: 1982-01-01
- Location: Miami Orange Bowl, Miami
- Game attendance: 72,748

Nebraska failed to capitalize on the opportunity for a national championship, coming in as #4 to attempt a takedown of the #1 Tigers as both the #2 and #3 teams dropped their own bowl games, but in a hard fought game that showed a near match of squads statistically, Clemson simply outplayed the Cornhuskers and took advantage of Nebraska mistakes to hold on to their 7-point lead for the final nine minutes to keep their claim on the #1 ranking, departing Miami with the 1981 national title.

== Rankings ==
Ranking movements Legend: ██ Increase in ranking ██ Decrease in ranking — = Not ranked
	Week														
Poll	Pre	1	2	3	4	5	6	7	8	9	10	11	12	13	Final
AP	6	7	17	15	—	—	19	15	12	11	7	5	5	4	11
Coaches															9

== Awards ==
Award	Name(s)
Outland Trophy	Dave Rimington
All-America 1st team	Dave Rimington, Jimmy Williams
All-America honorable mention	Dan Hurley, Jeff Krejci, Mike Rozier, Jamie Williams, Turner Gill
Big Eight Player of the Year	Dave Rimington
Big Eight Defensive Player of the Year	Jimmy Williams
Big Eight Offensive Newcomer of the Year	Mike Rozier
All-Big Eight 1st team	Roger Craig, Tony Felici, Turner Gill, Dan Hurley, Jeff Krejci, Ric Lindquist, Dave Rimington, Mike Rozier, Sammy Sims, Jamie Williams, Jimmy Williams
All-Big Eight 2nd team	Steve Damkroger, Roger Craig, Grant Campbell, Phil Bates, Mike Mandelko, Randy Theiss, Henry Waechter
All-Big Eight honorable mention	Phil Bates, Tom Carlstrom, Jeff Merrell

== NFL and pro players ==
The following Nebraska players who participated in the 1981 season later moved on to the next level and joined a professional team as draftees or free agents.

Name	Team
Mark Behning	Pittsburgh Steelers
Todd Brown	Montreal Concordes
Bret Clark	Tampa Bay Bandits
Roger Craig	San Francisco 49ers
Irving Fryar	New England Patriots
Turner Gill	Montreal Concordes
Dan Hurley	Boston Breakers
Brad Johnson	Boston Breakers
Mike Knox	Denver Broncos
Mitch Krenk	Chicago Bears
Rodney Lewis	New Orleans Saints
Allen Lyday	Houston Oilers
Bruce Mathison	San Diego Chargers
Jeff Merrell	Boston Breakers
Greg Orton	Detroit Lions
Dave Rimington	Cincinnati Bengals
Mike Rozier	Pittsburgh Maulers
Kevin Seibel	Chicago Blitz
Ricky Simmons	Washington Federals
Jeff Smith	Kansas City Chiefs
Anthony Steels	Boston Breakers
Dean Steinkuhler	Houston Oilers
Mark Traynowicz	Buffalo Bills
Henry Waechter	Chicago Bears
Jamie Williams	St. Louis Cardinals
Jimmy Williams	Detroit Lions
Toby Williams	New England Patriots
