= 1981 Southern Illinois Salukis football team =

American college football season

1981 Southern Illinois Salukis football
- Conference: Missouri Valley Conference
- Record: 7–4 (5–2 MVC)
- Head coach: Rey Dempsey (6th season)
- Home stadium: McAndrew Stadium

1981 Missouri Valley Conference football standings
	Conf.					Overall
Team	W		L		T	W		L		T
Drake +	5	–	1	–	0	10	–	1	–	0
Tulsa +	5	–	1	–	0	6	–	5	–	0
Southern Illinois	5	–	2	–	0	7	–	4	–	0
West Texas State	3	–	3	–	0	7	–	4	–	0
Wichita State	3	–	3	–	1	4	–	6	–	1
Indiana State	2	–	4	–	1	5	–	5	–	1
New Mexico State	1	–	5	–	0	3	–	8	–	0
Illinois State	0	–	5	–	0	3	–	7	–	0
+ – Conference co-champions

The 1981 Southern Illinois Salukis football team was an American football team that represented Southern Illinois University (now known as Southern Illinois University Carbondale) in the Missouri Valley Conference (MVC) during the 1981 NCAA Division I-A football season. Under sixth-year head coach Rey Dempsey, the team compiled a 7–4 record. The team played its home games at McAndrew Stadium in Carbondale, Illinois.

== Schedule ==
Date	Opponent	Site	Result	Attendance	Source
September 5	at McNeese State*	Cowboy Stadium; Lake Charles, LA	L 12–27	20,065	
September 12	Wichita State	McAndrew Stadium; Carbondale, IL	L 7–13	9,500	
September 19	Tennessee State*	McAndrew Stadium; Carbondale, IL	L 14–17	12,500	
September 26	at Tulsa	Skelly Stadium; Tulsa, OK	W 36–34	18,943	
October 3	Illinois State	McAndrew Stadium; Carbondale, IL	W 14–3	14,900	
October 10	at West Texas State	Kimbrough Memorial Stadium; Canyon, TX	W 29–22	9,950	
October 17	at Fresno State*	Bulldog Stadium; Fresno, CA	W 24–18	16,385	
October 24	Southwestern Louisiana*	McAndrew Stadium; Carbondale, IL	W 41–0	15,750	
November 1	at Indiana State	Memorial Stadium; Terre Haute, IN	W 17–3	8,432	
November 7	Drake	McAndrew Stadium; Carbondale, IL	L 17–22	17,000	
November 14	at New Mexico State	Aggie Memorial Stadium; Las Cruces, NM	W 23–15	13,076	
*Non-conference game
