= 1981 UT Arlington Mavericks football team =

American college football season

1981 UT Arlington Mavericks football

Southland champion
- Conference: Southland Conference
- Record: 6–5 (4–1 Southland)
- Head coach: Harold Elliott (8th season)
- Home stadium: Maverick Stadium

1981 Southland Conference football standings
| | Conf. | | | | | Overall |
| Team | W | | L | | T | W | | L | | T |
|---|---|---|---|---|---|---|---|---|---|---|
| UT Arlington $ | 4 | – | 1 | – | 0 | 6 | – | 5 | – | 0 |
| McNeese State | 3 | – | 1 | – | 1 | 7 | – | 3 | – | 1 |
| Arkansas State | 3 | – | 2 | – | 0 | 6 | – | 5 | – | 0 |
| Louisiana Tech | 2 | – | 2 | – | 1 | 4 | – | 6 | – | 1 |
| Lamar | 1 | – | 3 | – | 1 | 4 | – | 6 | – | 1 |
| Southwestern Louisiana | 0 | – | 4 | – | 1 | 1 | – | 9 | – | 1 |
$ – Conference champion

The 1981 UT Arlington Mavericks football team was an American football team that represented the University of Texas at Arlington in the Southland Conference during the 1981 NCAA Division I-A football season. In their eighth year under head coach Harold Elliott, the team compiled a 6–5 record and was Southland Conference champion.

== Schedule ==
| Date | Opponent | Site | Result | Attendance | Source |
|---|---|---|---|---|---|
| September 5 | at SMU* | Texas Stadium; Irving, TX | L 0–48 | 20,130 | |
| September 12 | New Mexico State* | Maverick Stadium; Arlington, TX | W 26–13 | 7,221 | |
| September 19 | at TCU* | Amon G. Carter Stadium; Fort Worth, TX | L 16–38 | 18,071 | |
| September 26 | at West Texas State* | Kimbrough Memorial Stadium; Canyon, TX | L 31–35 | 11,500 | |
| October 3 | at Southern Miss* | M. M. Roberts Stadium; Hattiesburg, MS | L 9–52 | 29,348 | |
| October 10 | Louisiana Tech | Maverick Stadium; Arlington, TX | W 31–14 | 5,138 | |
| October 24 | vs. North Texas State* | Cotton Bowl; Dallas, TX | W 7–6 | 15,797 | |
| October 31 | Arkansas State | Maverick Stadium; Arlington, TX | L 7–10 | 4,000 | |
| November 7 | at Southwestern Louisiana | Cajun Field; Lafayette, LA | W 23–7 | 18,103 | |
| November 14 | McNeese State | Maverick Stadium; Arlington, TX | W 21–20 | 5,000 | |
| November 21 | Lamar | Maverick Stadium; Arlington, TX | W 31–7 | 8,000 | |
*Non-conference game
