= 1981 Southwestern Louisiana Ragin' Cajuns football team =

American college football season

1981 Southwestern Louisiana Ragin' Cajuns football
- Conference: Southland Conference
- Record: 1–9–1 (0–4–1 Southland)
- Head coach: Sam Robertson (2nd season)
- Home stadium: Cajun Field

1981 Southland Conference football standings
	Conf.					Overall
Team	W		L		T	W		L		T
UT Arlington $	4	–	1	–	0	6	–	5	–	0
McNeese State	3	–	1	–	1	7	–	3	–	1
Arkansas State	3	–	2	–	0	6	–	5	–	0
Louisiana Tech	2	–	2	–	1	4	–	6	–	1
Lamar	1	–	3	–	1	4	–	6	–	1
Southwestern Louisiana	0	–	4	–	1	1	–	9	–	1
$ – Conference champion

The 1981 Southwestern Louisiana Ragin' Cajuns football team was an American football team that represented the University of Southwestern Louisiana (now known as the University of Louisiana at Lafayette) in the Southland Conference during the 1981 NCAA Division I-A football season. In their second year under head coach Sam Robertson, the team compiled a 1–9–1 record.

== Schedule ==
Date	Opponent	Site	Result	Attendance	Source
September 5	at Southern Miss*	M. M. Roberts Stadium; Hattiesburg, MS	L 7–33	23,576	
September 12	Southeastern Louisiana*	Cajun Field; Lafayette, LA (rivalry)	L 0–7	19,522	
September 19	at Northeast Louisiana*	Malone Stadium; Monroe, LA (rivalry)	L 17–20	12,555	
September 26	North Texas State*	Cajun Field; Lafayette, LA	W 34–11	15,260	
October 10	at Arkansas State	Indian Stadium; Jonesboro, AR	L 3–14	17,487	
October 17	East Carolina*	Cajun Field; Lafayette, LA	L 31–35	13,378	
October 24	at Southern Illinois*	McAndrew Stadium; Carbondale, IL	L 0–41	15,750	
October 31	at Louisiana Tech	Joe Aillet Stadium; Ruston, LA (rivalry)	T 17–17	13,500	
November 7	UT Arlington	Cajun Field; Lafayette, LA	L 7–23	18,103	
November 14	at Lamar	Cardinal Stadium; Beaumont, TX (Sabine Shoe)	L 12–14		
November 21	McNeese State	Cajun Field; Lafayette, LA (Cajun Crown)	L 7–14	19,173	
*Non-conference game
