= 1981 Drake Bulldogs football team =

American college football season

1981 Drake Bulldogs football

MVC co-champion
- Conference: Missouri Valley Conference
- Record: 10–1 (5–1 MVC)
- Head coach: Chuck Shelton (5th season)
- Offensive coordinator: John Hancock (2nd season)
- Defensive coordinator: Maury Waugh (1st season)
- Home stadium: Drake Stadium

1981 Missouri Valley Conference football standings
| | Conf. | | | | | Overall |
| Team | W | | L | | T | W | | L | | T |
|---|---|---|---|---|---|---|---|---|---|---|
| Drake + | 5 | – | 1 | – | 0 | 10 | – | 1 | – | 0 |
| Tulsa + | 5 | – | 1 | – | 0 | 6 | – | 5 | – | 0 |
| Southern Illinois | 5 | – | 2 | – | 0 | 7 | – | 4 | – | 0 |
| West Texas State | 3 | – | 3 | – | 0 | 7 | – | 4 | – | 0 |
| Wichita State | 3 | – | 3 | – | 1 | 4 | – | 6 | – | 1 |
| Indiana State | 2 | – | 4 | – | 1 | 5 | – | 5 | – | 1 |
| New Mexico State | 1 | – | 5 | – | 0 | 3 | – | 8 | – | 0 |
| Illinois State | 0 | – | 5 | – | 0 | 3 | – | 7 | – | 0 |
+ – Conference co-champions

The 1981 Drake Bulldogs football team represented the Drake University as a member of the Missouri Valley Conference (MVC) during the 1981 NCAA Division I-A football season. Led by fifth-year head coach Chuck Shelton, Drake compiled an overall record of 10–1 with a mark of 5–1 in conference play, sharing the MVC title with Tulsa.

== Schedule ==
| Date | Time | Opponent | Site | Result | Attendance | Source |
|---|---|---|---|---|---|---|
| September 5 | 1:30 p.m. | Northern Iowa | Drake Stadium; Des Moines, IA | W 39–30 | | |
| September 12 | 1:30 p.m. | Indiana State | Drake Stadium; Des Moines, IA | W 17–14 | 12,230 | |
| September 19 | 1:30 p.m. | Western Illinois | Drake Stadium; Des Moines, IA | W 21–6 | 10,185 | |
| September 26 | 1:30 p.m. | at Kansas State* | KSU Stadium; Manhattan, KS | W 18–17 | 31,220 | |
| October 3 | 1:30 p.m. | Long Beach State*^{†} | Drake Stadium; Des Moines, IA | W 18–7 | 16,730 | |
| October 10 | 1:30 p.m. | at Wichita State | Cessna Stadium; Wichita, KS | W 24–23 | 24,914 | |
| October 24 | 1:30 p.m. | West Texas State | Drake Stadium; Des Moines, IA | W 21–13 | 13,849 | |
| October 31 | 7:30 p.m. | at Tulsa | Skelly Stadium; Tulsa, OK | L 6–59 | 19,741 | |
| November 7 | 1:30 p.m. | at Southern Illinois | Saluki Stadium; Carbondale, IL | W 22–17 | 17,000 | |
| November 14 | 1:30 p.m. | at Illinois State | Hancock Stadium; Normal, IL | W 13–10 | 7,514 | |
| November 21 | 1:00 p.m. | Nebraska–Omaha* | Drake Stadium; Des Moines, IA | W 53–0 | 8,476 | |
*Non-conference game; ^{†}Homecoming; All times are in Central time
