= 1981 New Mexico State Aggies football team =

American college football season

1981 New Mexico State Aggies football
- Conference: Missouri Valley Conference
- Record: 3–8 (1–5 MVC)
- Head coach: Gil Krueger (4th season)
- Home stadium: Aggie Memorial Stadium

1981 Missouri Valley Conference football standings
| | Conf. | | | | | Overall |
| Team | W | | L | | T | W | | L | | T |
|---|---|---|---|---|---|---|---|---|---|---|
| Drake + | 5 | – | 1 | – | 0 | 10 | – | 1 | – | 0 |
| Tulsa + | 5 | – | 1 | – | 0 | 6 | – | 5 | – | 0 |
| Southern Illinois | 5 | – | 2 | – | 0 | 7 | – | 4 | – | 0 |
| West Texas State | 3 | – | 3 | – | 0 | 7 | – | 4 | – | 0 |
| Wichita State | 3 | – | 3 | – | 1 | 4 | – | 6 | – | 1 |
| Indiana State | 2 | – | 4 | – | 1 | 5 | – | 5 | – | 1 |
| New Mexico State | 1 | – | 5 | – | 0 | 3 | – | 8 | – | 0 |
| Illinois State | 0 | – | 5 | – | 0 | 3 | – | 7 | – | 0 |
+ – Conference co-champions

The 1981 New Mexico State Aggies football team was an American football team that represented New Mexico State University in the Missouri Valley Conference during the 1981 NCAA Division I-A football season. In their fourth year under head coach Gil Krueger, the Aggies compiled a 3–8 record. The team played its home games at Aggie Memorial Stadium in Las Cruces, New Mexico.

== Schedule ==
| Date | Opponent | Site | Result | Attendance | Source |
|---|---|---|---|---|---|
| September 5 | at UTEP* | Sun Bowl; El Paso, TX (rivalry) | W 14–7 | 25,600 | |
| September 12 | at UT Arlington* | Maverick Stadium; Arlington, TX | L 13–26 | | |
| September 19 | Indiana State | Aggie Memorial Stadium; Las Cruces, NM | L 6–41 | 19,380 | |
| October 3 | Wichita State | Aggie Memorial Stadium; Las Cruces, NM | L 20–24 | | |
| October 10 | at North Texas State* | Fouts Field; Denton, TX | L 16–38 | | |
| October 17 | at Illinois State | Hancock Stadium; Normal, IL | W 20–10 | 11,134 | |
| October 24 | New Mexico* | Aggie Memorial Stadium; Las Cruces, NM (rivalry) | L 13–17 | 19,253 | |
| October 31 | Western Illinois* | Aggie Memorial Stadium; Las Cruces, NM | W 31–24 | | |
| November 7 | at Tulsa | Skelly Stadium; Tulsa, OK | L 0–31 | 23,621 | |
| November 14 | Southern Illinois | Aggie Memorial Stadium; Las Cruces, NM | L 15–23 | | |
| November 21 | West Texas State | Aggie Memorial Stadium; Las Cruces, NM | L 9–45 | | |
*Non-conference game
