= 1981 Arkansas State Indians football team =

American college football season

1981 Arkansas State Indians football
- Conference: Southland Conference
- Record: 6–5 (3–2 Southland)
- Head coach: Larry Lacewell (3rd season)
- Home stadium: Indian Stadium

1981 Southland Conference football standings
| | Conf. | | | | | Overall |
| Team | W | | L | | T | W | | L | | T |
|---|---|---|---|---|---|---|---|---|---|---|
| UT Arlington $ | 4 | – | 1 | – | 0 | 6 | – | 5 | – | 0 |
| McNeese State | 3 | – | 1 | – | 1 | 7 | – | 3 | – | 1 |
| Arkansas State | 3 | – | 2 | – | 0 | 6 | – | 5 | – | 0 |
| Louisiana Tech | 2 | – | 2 | – | 1 | 4 | – | 6 | – | 1 |
| Lamar | 1 | – | 3 | – | 1 | 4 | – | 6 | – | 1 |
| Southwestern Louisiana | 0 | – | 4 | – | 1 | 1 | – | 9 | – | 1 |
$ – Conference champion

The 1981 Arkansas State Indians football team was an American football team that represented the Arkansas State University as a member of the Southland Conference during the 1981 NCAA Division I-A football season. In their third season under head coach Larry Lacewell, the Indians compiled an overall record of 6–5 with a mark of 3–2 in conference play, placing third in the Southland.

== Schedule ==
| Date | Opponent | Site | Result | Attendance | Source |
|---|---|---|---|---|---|
| September 12 | at Northeast Louisiana* | Malone Stadium; Monroe, LA | W 35–13 | | |
| September 19 | Richmond* | Indian Stadium; Jonesboro, AR | L 20–24 | 12,864 | |
| September 26 | at Central Michigan* | Perry Shorts Stadium; Mount Pleasant, MI | W 26–23 | | |
| October 3 | at Kansas* | Memorial Stadium; Lawrence, KS | L 16–17 | 32,100 | |
| October 10 | Southwestern Louisiana^{†} | Indian Stadium; Jonesboro, AR | W 14–3 | 17,487 | |
| October 17 | Chattanooga* | Indian Stadium; Jonesboro, AR | L 2–3 | 5,000 | |
| October 24 | at McNeese State | Cowboy Stadium; Lake Charles, LA | L 7–21 | 21,254 | |
| October 31 | at UT Arlington | Maverick Stadium; Arlington, TX | W 10–7 | 4,000 | |
| November 7 | Lamar | Indian Stadium; Jonesboro, AR | W 16–9 | 9,127 | |
| November 14 | at Louisiana Tech | Joe Aillet Stadium; Ruston, LA | L 0–32 | 15,000 | |
| November 21 | Tulsa* | Indian Stadium; Jonesboro, AR | W 31–7 | 10,419 | |
*Non-conference game; ^{†}Homecoming
