= 1981 Southwest Missouri State Bears football team =

American college football season

1981 Southwest Missouri State Bears football
- Conference: Association of Mid-Continent Universities
- Record: 3–5–2 (0–3 Mid-Con)
- Head coach: Rich Johanningmeier (6th season)
- Captains: Tim Bauer; John Harvey
- Home stadium: Briggs Stadium

1981 Association of Mid-Continent Universities football standings
	Conf.					Overall
Team	W		L		T	W		L		T
Northern Iowa +	2	–	1	–	0	7	–	4	–	0
Eastern Illinois +	2	–	1	–	0	6	–	5	–	0
Western Illinois +	2	–	1	–	0	5	–	6	–	0
Southwest Missouri State	0	–	3	–	0	3	–	5	–	2
+ – Conference co-champions

The 1981 Southwest Missouri State Bears football team represented Southwest Missouri State University (now known as Missouri State University) as a member of the Association of Mid-Continent Universities (Mid-Con) during the 1981 NCAA Division I-AA football season. Led by sixth-year head coach Rich Johanningmeier, the Bears compiled an overall record of 3–5–2, with a mark of 0–3 in conference play, and finished last in the Mid-Con.

== Schedule ==
Date	Opponent	Site	Result	Attendance	Source
September 12	at Eastern Illinois	O'Brien Field; Charleston, IL	L 14–23		
September 19	Harding*	Briggs Stadium; Springfield, MO	W 21–18		
September 26	at Western Illinois	Hanson Field; Macomb, IL	L 7–19	9,003	
October 3	Southeast Missouri State*	Briggs Stadium; Springfield, MO	W 23–11	6,900	
October 10	at Central Missouri State*	Kennedy Field; Warrensburg, MO	T 6–6	8,000	
October 24	Northern Iowa	Briggs Stadium; Springfield, MO	L 17–20		
October 31	at Northeast Missouri State*	Stokes Stadium; Kirksville, MO	L 20–27		
November 7	North Alabama*	Briggs Stadium; Springfield, MO	L 21–28		
November 14	at Lincoln (MO)*	Dwight T. Reed Stadium; Jefferson City, MO	W 47–7		
November 21	at Nicholls State*	John L. Guidry Stadium; Thibodaux, LA	T 20–20	3,035	
*Non-conference game
