= 1981 Illinois State Redbirds football team =

American college football season

1981 Illinois State Redbirds football
- Conference: Missouri Valley Conference
- Record: 3–7 (0–5 MVC)
- Head coach: Bob Otolski (1st season)
- MVP: Anthony Office
- Captains: Willie Boyd; Anthony Office; Wade Mauland
- Home stadium: Hancock Stadium

1981 Missouri Valley Conference football standings
	Conf.					Overall
Team	W		L		T	W		L		T
Drake +	5	–	1	–	0	10	–	1	–	0
Tulsa +	5	–	1	–	0	6	–	5	–	0
Southern Illinois	5	–	2	–	0	7	–	4	–	0
West Texas State	3	–	3	–	0	7	–	4	–	0
Wichita State	3	–	3	–	1	4	–	6	–	1
Indiana State	2	–	4	–	1	5	–	5	–	1
New Mexico State	1	–	5	–	0	3	–	8	–	0
Illinois State	0	–	5	–	0	3	–	7	–	0
+ – Conference co-champions

The 1981 Illinois State Redbirds football team was an American football team that represented Illinois State University as a member of the Missouri Valley Conference (MVC) during the 1981 NCAA Division I-A football season. In their first year under head coach Bob Otolski, the Redbirds compiled an overall record of 3–7 with a mark of 0–5 in conference play, placing last out of eight teams in the MVC. Illinois State played home games at Hancock Stadium in Normal, Illinois.

== Schedule ==
Date	Opponent	Site	Result	Attendance	Source
September 5	Western Illinois*	Hancock Stadium; Normal, IL	W 31–7	9,179	
September 19	Eastern Michigan*	Hancock Stadium; Normal, IL	W 28–7	13,824	
September 26	at Northern Illinois*	Huskie Stadium; DeKalb, IL	L 7–40	15,387	
October 3	at Southern Illinois*	McAndrew Stadium; Carbondale, IL	L 3–14	14,900	
October 10	Eastern Illinois*	Hancock Stadium; Normal, IL (rivalry)	W 25–3	7,808	
October 17	New Mexico State^{†}	Hancock Stadium; Normal, IL	L 10–20	11,134	
October 24	at Indiana State	Memorial Stadium; Terre Haute, IN	L 14–34	7,618	
October 31	at Wichita State	Cessna Stadium; Wichita, KS	L 7–28	8,120	
November 14	Drake	Hancock Stadium; Normal, IL	L 10–13	7,514	
November 21	Ball State*	Hancock Stadium; Normal, IL	L 10–14	4,832	
*Non-conference game; ^{†}Homecoming

== Roster ==
1981 Illinois State Redbirds football team roster
Players
Coaches
Offense

Pos.	#	Name	Class
WR	13	Willie Boyd	Sr
WR	84	Clarence Collins	So
QB	14	John Coppens	Fr
RB	33	Michael Fizer	So
FB	42	Dave George	Jr
C	53	Mark Rodenhauser	So

Defense

Pos.	#	Name	Class
LB	46	John Casey	Jr
LB	43	Pat Cassidy	Sr
DB	21	Jim Collier	Sr
DB	22	Curt Cox	So
DT	67	Bruce Edwards	Jr
S	15	Mike Prior	Fr

Special teams

Pos.	#	Name	Class

Head coach

- Bob Otolski

Coordinators/assistant coaches

Legend

- (C) Team captain
- (S) Suspended
- (I) Ineligible
- Injured
- Redshirt
