= 1981 Lamar Cardinals football team =

American college football season

1981 Lamar Cardinals football
- Conference: Southland Conference
- Record: 4–6–1 (1–3–1 Southland)
- Head coach: Larry Kennan (3rd season)
- Home stadium: Cardinal Stadium

1981 Southland Conference football standings
	Conf.					Overall
Team	W		L		T	W		L		T
UT Arlington $	4	–	1	–	0	6	–	5	–	0
McNeese State	3	–	1	–	1	7	–	3	–	1
Arkansas State	3	–	2	–	0	6	–	5	–	0
Louisiana Tech	2	–	2	–	1	4	–	6	–	1
Lamar	1	–	3	–	1	4	–	6	–	1
Southwestern Louisiana	0	–	4	–	1	1	–	9	–	1
$ – Conference champion

The 1981 Lamar Cardinals football team represented Lamar University in the 1981 NCAA Division I-A football season as a member of the Southland Conference. The Cardinals played their home games at Cardinal Stadium now named Provost Umphrey Stadium in Beaumont, Texas. Lamar finished the 1981 season with a 4–6–1 overall record and a 1–3–1 conference record. A highlight for the season was a last second victory over the defending Southwest Conference champion Baylor Bears at the Bears' home field, Floyd Casey Stadium in Waco, Texas.

== Schedule ==
Date	Opponent	Site	Result	Attendance	Source
September 5	at Baylor*	Baylor Stadium; Waco, TX	W 18–17	22,000	
September 19	vs. Sam Houston State*	Houston Astrodome; Houston, TX	W 50–7	12,500	
September 26	Southwest Texas State*	Cardinal Stadium; Beaumont, TX	L 7–24		
October 3	Stephen F. Austin*	Cardinal Stadium; Beaumont, TX	L 10–13		
October 10	at Northeast Louisiana*	Malone Stadium; Monroe, LA	W 17–13		
October 17	Louisiana Tech	Cardinal Stadium; Beaumont, TX	L 7–16	9,208	
October 31	McNeese State	Cardinal Stadium; Beaumont, TX (rivalry)	T 20–20		
November 7	at Arkansas State	Indian Stadium; Jonesboro, AR	L 9–16	9,127	
November 14	Southwestern Louisiana	Cardinal Stadium; Beaumont, TX (rivalry)	W 14–12		
November 21	at UT Arlington	Maverick Stadium; Arlington, TX	L 7–31	8,000	
November 28	at No. 17 Southern Miss*	M. M. Roberts Stadium; Hattiesburg, MS	L 14–45	31,842	
*Non-conference game; Rankings from Coaches' Poll released prior to the game

== Postseason ==
=== Move to NCAA Division I-AA ===
The 1981 season marked the Cardinals' final season at the NCAA Division I-A level. The Southland Conference along with several other conferences including the Ivy League, Southern Conference, several members of the Missouri Valley Conference, as well as several other teams were forced down to NCAA Division I-AA after failing to meet attendance / stadium size attendance requirements.

=== Head coach resignation ===
The 1981 season was Larry Kennan's last season as the Cardinals' head football coach. Kennan left the team after the conclusion of the 1981 season to take an assistant coaching position with the Los Angeles Rams.
