= 1981 Louisiana Tech Bulldogs football team =

American college football season

1981 Louisiana Tech Bulldogs football
- Conference: Southland Conference
- Record: 4–6–1 (2–2–1 Southland)
- Head coach: Billy Brewer (2nd season)
- Captains: Lyn Bankston; Andre Young
- Home stadium: Joe Aillet Stadium

1981 Southland Conference football standings
	Conf.					Overall
Team	W		L		T	W		L		T
UT Arlington $	4	–	1	–	0	6	–	5	–	0
McNeese State	3	–	1	–	1	7	–	3	–	1
Arkansas State	3	–	2	–	0	6	–	5	–	0
Louisiana Tech	2	–	2	–	1	4	–	6	–	1
Lamar	1	–	3	–	1	4	–	6	–	1
Southwestern Louisiana	0	–	4	–	1	1	–	9	–	1
$ – Conference champion

The 1981 Louisiana Tech Bulldogs football team was an American football team that represented Louisiana Tech University as a member of the Southland Conference during the 1981 NCAA Division I-A football season. In their second year under head coach Billy Brewer, the team compiled a 4–6–1 record.

== Schedule ==
Date	Opponent	Site	Result	Attendance	Source
September 5	at West Texas State*	Kimbrough Memorial Stadium; Canyon, TX	L 10–17	8,000	
September 12	East Tennessee State*	Joe Aillet Stadium; Ruston, LA	W 31–3	17,500	
September 19	Baylor*	State Fair Stadium; Shreveport, LA	L 21–28	21,000	
September 26	at Texas A&M*	Kyle Field; College Station, TX	L 7–43	56,217	
October 3	Northeast Louisiana*	Joe Aillet Stadium; Ruston, LA (rivalry)	L 0–35	23,500	
October 10	at UT Arlington	Maverick Stadium; Arlington, TX	L 14–31	5,138	
October 17	at Lamar	Cardinal Stadium; Beaumont, TX	W 16–7	9,208	
October 24	vs. Northwestern State*	State Fair Stadium; Shreveport, LA (rivalry)	W 37–33	22,300	
October 31	Southwestern Louisiana	Joe Aillet Stadium; Ruston, LA (rivalry)	T 17–17	13,500	
November 7	at McNeese State	Cowboy Stadium; Lake Charles, LA	L 20–27	20,000	
November 14	Arkansas State	Joe Aillet Stadium; Ruston, LA	W 32–0	15,000	
*Non-conference game
