= 1981 Kansas State Wildcats football team =

American college football season

1981 Kansas State Wildcats football
- Conference: Big Eight Conference
- Record: 2–9 (1–6 Big 8)
- Head coach: Jim Dickey (4th season)
- Offensive coordinator: Jerry Boyce (1st season)
- Defensive coordinator: Gary Darnell (4th season)
- Home stadium: KSU Stadium

1981 Big Eight Conference football standings
	Conf.					Overall
Team	W		L		T	W		L		T
No. 11 Nebraska $	7	–	0	–	0	9	–	3	–	0
No. 20 Oklahoma	4	–	2	–	1	7	–	4	–	1
Kansas	4	–	3	–	0	7	–	5	–	0
Oklahoma State	4	–	3	–	0	7	–	5	–	0
No. 19 Missouri	3	–	4	–	0	8	–	4	–	0
Iowa State	2	–	4	–	1	5	–	5	–	1
Colorado	2	–	5	–	0	3	–	8	–	0
Kansas State	1	–	6	–	0	2	–	9	–	0
$ – Conference champion; Rankings from AP Poll

The 1981 Kansas State Wildcats football team represented Kansas State University in the 1981 NCAA Division I-A football season. The team's head football coach was Jim Dickey. The Wildcats played their home games in KSU Stadium. 1981 saw the wildcats finish with a record of 2–9, and a 1–6 record in Big Eight Conference play.

== Schedule ==
Date	Opponent	Site	Result	Attendance	Source
September 12	South Dakota*	KSU Stadium; Manhattan, KS	W 31–10	20,210	
September 19	at No. 15 Washington*	Husky Stadium; Seattle, WA	L 3–20	52,343	
September 26	Drake*	KSU Stadium; Manhattan, KS	L 17–18	31,220	
October 3	at Tulsa*	Skelly Stadium; Tulsa, OK	L 21–35	18,196	
October 10	at No. 13 Missouri	Faurot Field; Columbia, MO	L 13–58	61,012	
October 17	No. 19 Nebraska	KSU Stadium; Manhattan, KS (rivalry)	L 3–49	45,915	
October 24	at Kansas	Memorial Stadium; Lawrence, KS (rivalry)	L 14–17	51,600	
October 31	No. 11 Iowa State^{†}	KSU Stadium; Manhattan, KS (rivalry)	W 10–7	26,650	
November 7	No. 17 Oklahoma	KSU Stadium; Manhattan, KS	L 21–28	33,200	
November 14	at Oklahoma State	Lewis Field; Stillwater, OK	L 10–31	49,300	
November 21	at Colorado	Folsom Field; Boulder, CO (rivalry)	L 21–24	23,921	
*Non-conference game; ^{†}Homecoming; Rankings from AP Poll released prior to the game

== Roster ==
1981 Kansas State Wildcats football team roster
Players
Coaches
Offense

Pos.	#	Name	Class
QB	11	Donnie Campbell	So
QB	12	Stan Weber	So
TE	80	Mike Cox	Jr
QB	4	Darrell Ray Dickey	Jr
OT	77	Doug Hoppock	Sr
C	56	Jim Kennedy	Jr
WR	89	Rick Manning	So
RB	20	Kenny Smith	Sr

Defense

Pos.	#	Name	Class
CB	15	Greg Best	Sr
LB	24	Vic Kenning	Sr
FS	8	Mike Kopsky	Jr
DB	47	Jim Bob Morris	Sr
LB	99	Mike Orr	So
LB	57	Jack Williamson	Sr

Special teams

Pos.	#	Name	Class
P	5	Scott Fulhage	Fr

Head coach

- Jim Dickey

Coordinators/assistant coaches

- Gary Darnell – Defensive Coordinator & assistant head coach
- Jerry Boyce – Offensive Coordinator
- Joe Hatcher – Quarterbacks
- Don Bocchi – Running backs
- Dick Bumpas – Defensive line
- Mo Lattimore – Outside linebacker
- Chuck Driesbach – Defensive backs
- Jim Davie – Assistant

Legend

- (C) Team captain
- (S) Suspended
- (I) Ineligible
- Injured
- Redshirt
