= 1981 McNeese State Cowboys football team =

American college football season

1981 McNeese State Cowboys football
- Conference: Southland Conference
- Record: 7–3–1 (3–1–1 Southland)
- Head coach: Ernie Duplechin (3rd season)
- Defensive coordinator: Hubert Boales (3rd season)
- Home stadium: Cowboy Stadium

1981 Southland Conference football standings
	Conf.					Overall
Team	W		L		T	W		L		T
UT Arlington $	4	–	1	–	0	6	–	5	–	0
McNeese State	3	–	1	–	1	7	–	3	–	1
Arkansas State	3	–	2	–	0	6	–	5	–	0
Louisiana Tech	2	–	2	–	1	4	–	6	–	1
Lamar	1	–	3	–	1	4	–	6	–	1
Southwestern Louisiana	0	–	4	–	1	1	–	9	–	1
$ – Conference champion

The 1981 McNeese State Cowboys football team represented McNeese State University as a member of the Southland Conference during the 1981 NCAA Division I-A football season. Led by Ernie Duplechin in his third and final season as head coach, the Cowboys compiled an overall record of 7–3–1 with a mark of 3–1–1 in conference play, placing second in the Southland.

== Schedule ==
Date	Opponent	Site	Result	Attendance	Source
September 5	Southern Illinois*	Cowboy Stadium; Lake Charles, LA	W 27–12	20,065	
September 12	at Ball State*	Ball State Stadium; Muncie, IN	L 21–24	14,337	
September 19	at Nicholls State*	John L. Guidry Stadium; Thibodaux, LA	W 59–9	7,500	
October 3	West Texas State*	Cowboy Stadium; Lake Charles, LA	L 24–31	20,850	
October 10	at Northwestern State*	Harry Turpin Stadium; Natchitoches, LA (rivalry)	W 42–21		
October 17	Northeast Louisiana*	Cowboy Stadium; Lake Charles, LA	W 41–25		
October 24	Arkansas State	Cowboy Stadium; Lake Charles, LA	W 21–7	21,254	
October 31	at Lamar	Cardinal Stadium; Beaumont, TX (rivalry)	T 20–20		
November 7	Louisiana Tech	Cowboy Stadium; Lake Charles, LA	W 27–20	13,500	
November 14	at UT Arlington	Maverick Stadium; Arlington, TX	L 20–21	5,000	
November 21	at Southwestern Louisiana	Cajun Field; Lafayette, LA (rivalry)	W 14–7	19,173	
*Non-conference game
