= 1981 Indiana State Sycamores football team =

American college football season

1981 Indiana State Sycamores football
- Conference: Missouri Valley Conference
- Record: 5–5–1 (2–4–1 MVC)
- Head coach: Dennis Raetz (2nd season)
- Offensive coordinator: Pete Hoener (2nd season)
- Home stadium: Memorial Stadium

1981 Missouri Valley Conference football standings
	Conf.					Overall
Team	W		L		T	W		L		T
Drake +	5	–	1	–	0	10	–	1	–	0
Tulsa +	5	–	1	–	0	6	–	5	–	0
Southern Illinois	5	–	2	–	0	7	–	4	–	0
West Texas State	3	–	3	–	0	7	–	4	–	0
Wichita State	3	–	3	–	1	4	–	6	–	1
Indiana State	2	–	4	–	1	5	–	5	–	1
New Mexico State	1	–	5	–	0	3	–	8	–	0
Illinois State	0	–	5	–	0	3	–	7	–	0
+ – Conference co-champions

The 1981 Indiana State Sycamores football team was an American football team that represented Indiana State University as a member of the Missouri Valley Conference during the 1981 NCAA Division I-A football season. In their second year under head coach Dennis Raetz, the team compiled a 5–5–1 record (2–4–1 in the MVC).

== Schedule ==
Date	Time	Opponent	Site	Result	Attendance	Source
September 5	8:30 p.m.	at Northeast Louisiana*	Malone Stadium; Monroe, LA	L 8–38		
September 12	2:30 p.m.	at Drake	Drake Stadium; Des Moines, IA	L 14–17	12,230	
September 19	3:30 p.m.	at New Mexico State	Aggie Memorial Stadium; Las Cruces, NM	W 41–6	19,380	
September 26	7:30 p.m.	Wichita State	Memorial Stadium; Terre Haute, IN	T 14–14	12,283	
October 10	1:30 p.m.	Ball State*^{†}	Memorial Stadium; Terre Haute, IN	W 31–7		
October 17	1:30 p.m.	Tulsa	Memorial Stadium; Terre Haute, IN	L 19–20	5,293	
October 24	1:30 p.m.	Illinois State	Memorial Stadium; Terre Haute, IN	W 34–14	7,618	
November 1	1:30 p.m.	Southern Illinois	Memorial Stadium; Terre Haute, IN	L 3–17	8,432	
November 7	2:30 p.m.	at West Texas State	Kimbrough Memorial Stadium; Canyon, TX	L 14–17		
November 14	2:30 p.m.	at Eastern Illinois*	O'Brien Field; Charleston, IL	W 27–14		
November 21	1:30 p.m.	at Marshall*	Fairfield Stadium; Huntington, WV	W 42–0		
*Non-conference game; ^{†}Homecoming; All times are in Eastern time
