= Bob Baccarini =

Biographical details
- Born: July 28, 1925 (age 101)
- Died: August 11, 2012 (aged 87)

Accomplishments and honors

Championships
- Junior Rose Bowl

Awards
- 1965 Junior College Coach of the Year; National Junior College Athletic Association Hall of Fame; Trinity Valley Community College Hall of Fame

Records
- 55–27–1

Louis Francis Baccarini (July 28, 1925 – August 11, 2012), also known as Bob Baccarini, was an American hall of fame junior college football coach.

== Biography ==
Baccarini played football for Oklahoma A&M University and Bacone College as a linebacker.

Baccarini was the assistant football coach and the junior high football coach at Wewoka prior to 1957 and had coaching duties at Carnegie and Frederick. He became head football coach at Holdenville High School in 1957.

He was a football coach at the Henderson County Junior College football team in 1960 and in 1964, became the head coach. As head coach, he guided his team to four bowl appearances with his team winning the Junior Rose Bowl and becoming the #1 ranked junior college team. For his efforts, Baccarini was awarded the 1965 Junior College Coach of the Year award by the Texas Sports Writers Association and the Dallas Morning News. He later led his team to four straight Texas Junior College Football Association Conference Titles.

He was named to the National Junior College Athletic Association Hall of Fame in 1996 and was named to the Trinity Valley Community College Hall of Fame in 2008.

Baccarini died on August 11, 2012.

== Personal life ==
Baccarini became a probation officer in 1984.

Baccarini's son, Tony Baccarini, also became a football coach, coaching for Sulphur Springs, South Garland and Kilgore College.
