= Scott Leggett =

American football player (1962–1997)

No. 75
- Positions: Guard, Tackle

Personal information
- Born: September 2, 1962; Muskogee, Oklahoma, U.S.
- Died: February 25, 1997 (aged 34)
- Listed height: 6 ft 3 in (1.91 m)
- Listed weight: 285 lb (129 kg)

Career information
- High school: Muskogee
- College: Central Oklahoma
- NFL draft: 1986: undrafted

Career history
- Philadelphia Eagles (1987)
- Stats at Pro Football Reference

Scott Leggett was an American professional football player who played offensive lineman for two seasons for the Philadelphia Eagles. He played college football at Oklahoma and Central Oklahoma.
