= Mike Reilly (1980s linebacker) =

American football player (born 1959)

No. 57
- Position: Linebacker

Personal information
- Born: February 14, 1959 (age 67); Miami, Florida, U.S.
- Listed height: 6 ft 4 in (1.93 m)
- Listed weight: 217 lb (98 kg)

Career information
- High school: Christopher Columbus (Miami, Florida)
- College: Oklahoma
- NFL draft: 1982: 8th round, 207th overall pick

Career history
- Los Angeles Rams (1982)
- Stats at Pro Football Reference

Michael Dennis Reilly (born February 14, 1959) is an American former professional football player who was a linebacker with the Los Angeles Rams in the National Football League (NFL). He played college football with the Oklahoma Sooners, and was drafted by the Rams in the eighth round of the 1982 NFL draft. During training camp as a Rams rookie in 1982, Reilly was involved in a car accident that killed a 17-year-old boy. He served a one-year jail sentence for drunken driving and felony vehicular manslaughter.
