= Robert Williams (defensive back, born September 1962) =

American football player (born 1962)

No. 28
- Position: Safety

Personal information
- Born: September 26, 1962 (age 64); Chicago, Illinois, U.S.
- Listed height: 5 ft 11 in (1.80 m)
- Listed weight: 202 lb (92 kg)

Career information
- High school: Dunbar Vocational Career Academy
- College: Eastern Illinois
- NFL draft: 1984: undrafted

Career history
- Pittsburgh Steelers (1984–1985)

Robert Anthony Williams (born September 26, 1962) is an American former professional football safety who played for the Pittsburgh Steelers of the National Football League (NFL). He played college football at Eastern Illinois University.
