= 1981 Missouri Tigers football team =

American college football season

1981 Missouri Tigers football

Tangerine Bowl champion

Tangerine Bowl, W 19–17 vs. Southern Miss
- Conference: Big Eight Conference

Ranking
- Coaches: No. 20
- AP: No. 19
- Record: 8–4 (3–4 Big 8)
- Head coach: Warren Powers (4th season)
- Defensive coordinator: Carl Reese (5th season)
- Home stadium: Faurot Field

1981 Big Eight Conference football standings
	Conf.					Overall
Team	W		L		T	W		L		T
No. 11 Nebraska $	7	–	0	–	0	9	–	3	–	0
No. 20 Oklahoma	4	–	2	–	1	7	–	4	–	1
Kansas	4	–	3	–	0	7	–	5	–	0
Oklahoma State	4	–	3	–	0	7	–	5	–	0
No. 19 Missouri	3	–	4	–	0	8	–	4	–	0
Iowa State	2	–	4	–	1	5	–	5	–	1
Colorado	2	–	5	–	0	3	–	8	–	0
Kansas State	1	–	6	–	0	2	–	9	–	0
$ – Conference champion; Rankings from AP Poll

The 1981 Missouri Tigers football team represented the University of Missouri as a member of the Big Eight Conference (Big 8) during the 1981 NCAA Division I-A football season. Led by fourth-year head coach Warren Powers, the Tigers compiled an overall record of 8–4 with a mark of 3–4 in conference play, placing fifth in the Big 8. Missouri was invited to the Tangerine Bowl, in which they defeated Southern Miss by a score of 19–17. The team played home game at Faurot Field in Columbia, Missouri.

== Schedule ==
Date	Opponent	Rank	Site	Result	Attendance	Source
September 12	Army*		Faurot Field; Columbia, MO	W 24–10	60,033	
September 19	Rice*		Faurot Field; Columbia, MO	W 42–10	57,112	
September 26	Louisville*		Faurot Field; Columbia, MO	W 34–3	57,448	
October 3	at No. 9 Mississippi State*		Mississippi Veterans Memorial Stadium; Jackson, MS	W 14–3	40,776	
October 10	Kansas State	No. 13	Faurot Field; Columbia, MO	W 58–13	61,012	
October 17	at Iowa State	No. 8	Cyclone Stadium; Ames, IA (rivalry)	L 13–34	53,220	
October 24	No. 15 Nebraska	No. 19	Faurot Field; Columbia, MO (rivalry)	L 0–6	72,001	
October 31	Oklahoma State		Faurot Field; Columbia, MO	L 12–16	57,541	
November 7	at Colorado		Folsom Field; Boulder, CO	W 30–14	35,782	
November 14	No. 15 Oklahoma		Faurot Field; Columbia, MO (rivalry)	W 19–14	67,364	
November 21	at Kansas		Memorial Stadium; Lawrence, KS (Border War)	L 11–19	47,500	
December 19	vs. No. 18 Southern Miss*		Orlando Stadium; Orlando, FL (Tangerine Bowl)	W 19–17	50,045	
*Non-conference game; Rankings from AP Poll released prior to the game

== Game summaries ==
=== Oklahoma ===
Team	1	2	3	4	Total
Oklahoma	7	0	0	7	14
• Missouri	3	10	6	0	19

- Date: November 14
- Location: Faurot Field • Columbia, Missouri

Scoring summary
1	MIZZ	Lucchesi 24 yard field goal	Missouri 3-0
1	OKLA	Shepard 14 yard run (Keeling kick)	Oklahoma 7-3
2	MIZZ	Perry 1 yard run (Lucchesi kick)	Missouri 10-7
2	MIZZ	Lucchesi 23 yard field goal	Missouri 13-7
3	MIZZ	Meyer 19 yard run (kick failed)	Missouri 19-7
4	OKLA	Sewell 46 yard pass from Shepard (Keeling kick)	Missouri 19-14

Missouri's first win versus Oklahoma since 1969.

== Roster ==
1981 Missouri Tigers football team roster
Players
Coaches
Offense

Pos.	#	Name	Class
C	55	Brad Edelman	Sr
TE	83	Andy Gibler	Jr

Defense

Pos.	#	Name	Class
DB	29	Demetrious Johnson	Jr
LB		Jeff Gaylord

Special teams

Pos.	#	Name	Class

Head coach

- Warren Powers

Coordinators/assistant coaches

- Jim Donnan – Quarterback/wide receiver
- Billy Thornton – Running backs
- Dick Beechner – Tight ends/special teams coordinator
- John Faiman – Offensive line
- Carl Reese – Defensive coordinator
- George Wheeler – Defensive tackles
- Zaven Yaralian – Defensive backs
- Mark Heydorff – Assistant

Legend

- (C) Team captain
- (S) Suspended
- (I) Ineligible
- Injured
- Redshirt
