= Eugene Williams (American football) =

American football player (born 1960)

No. 54
- Position: Linebacker

Personal information
- Born: June 15, 1960 (age 66); Gregg County, Texas, U.S.
- Listed height: 6 ft 1 in (1.85 m)
- Listed weight: 220 lb (100 kg)

Career information
- High school: Longview (Longview, Texas)
- College: Tulsa
- NFL draft: 1982: 7th round, 174th overall pick

Career history
- Seattle Seahawks (1982–1984)
- Stats at Pro Football Reference

Eugene Williams III (born June 15, 1960) is an American former professional football linebacker who played for the Seattle Seahawks of the National Football League (NFL). He played college football for the Tulsa Golden Hurricane and was selected by the Seahawks in the seventh round of the 1982 NFL draft.

== Early life ==
Eugene Williams III was born on June 15, 1960, in Gregg County, Texas. He played high school football at Longview High School in Longview, Texas. He was the District 14-AAAA defensive player of the year as a senior in 1977.

== College career ==
In February 1978, Williams committed to the University of Tulsa to play college football for the Golden Hurricane as a defensive end. He was a member of the team from 1978 to 1981. He had two interceptions for 45 yards his senior year in 1981.

== Professional career ==
Williams was selected by the Seattle Seahawks in the seventh round, with the 174th overall pick, of the 1982 NFL draft. He made his only career NFL start during the 1982 regular season finale against the Denver Broncos, posting eight tackles in a 13–11 win. He played in nine games overall, mostly on special teams, in 1982. Williams appeared in four games as a reserve linebacker in 1983 and intercepted one pass before being placed on injured reserve on October 7, 1983, due to stress fractures in both legs. Williams had seemingly recovered in 1984 but suffered another stress fracture in his left leg while working out in June 1984. On July 14, 1984, he was placed on the reserve/physically unable to perform list after failing his physical. He missed the entire 1984 season. Williams was released in 1985 before the season.

== Personal life ==
Williams' older brother, Henry Williams, played college football for the Texas Longhorns.
