= Jack Trice Stadium =

Football stadium in Ames, Iowa

MidAmerican Energy Field at Jack Trice Stadium
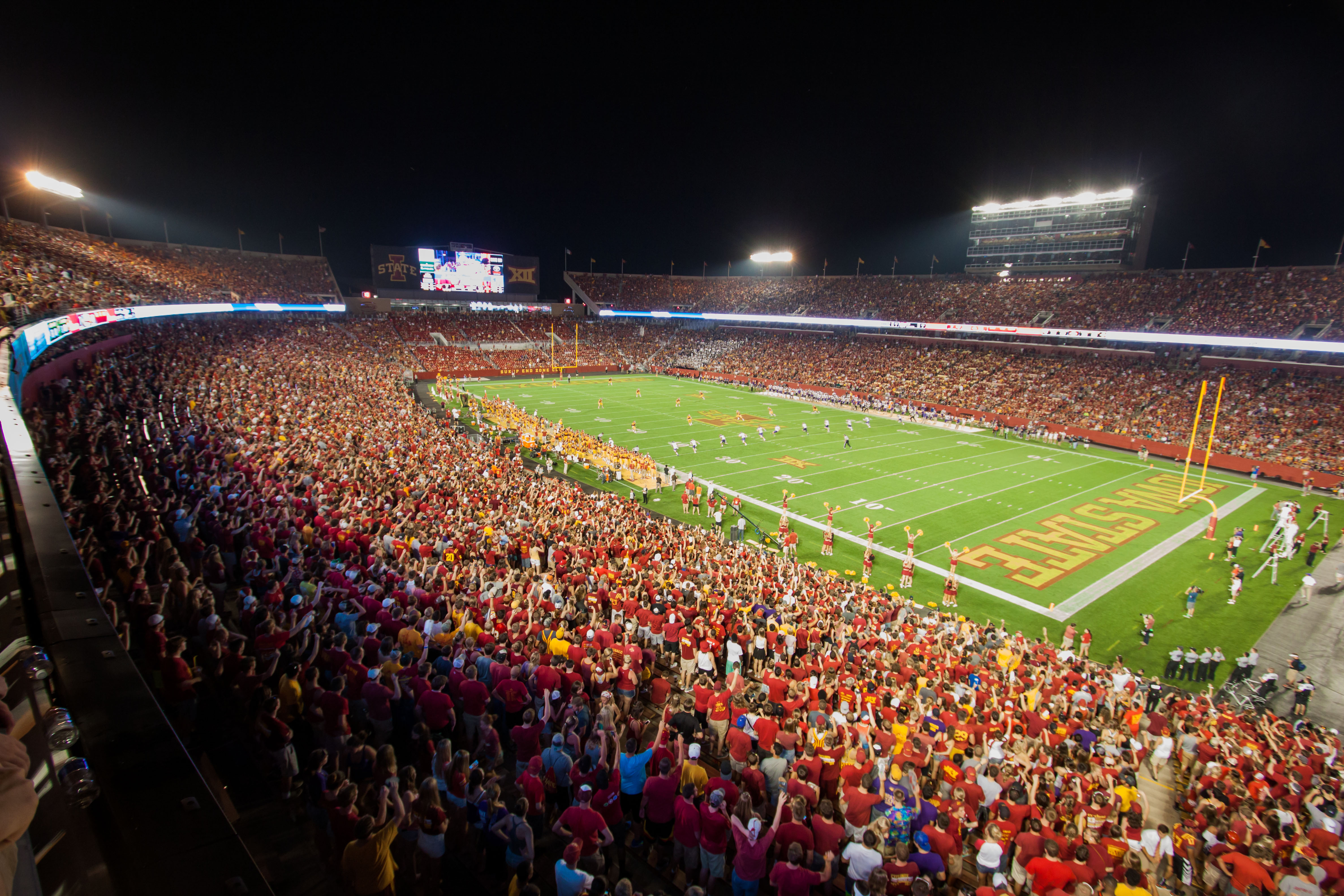
- The stadium during a game in fall of 2015

- Location in Iowa Location in the United States
- Former names: Cyclone Stadium / Jack Trice Field (1975–1997); Jack Trice Stadium (1997–present)
- Location: 1798 South 4th Street; Ames, Iowa 50010
- Coordinates: 42°0′51″N 93°38′9″W
- Operator: Iowa State University
- Capacity: 61,500 (2015–present) Former capacity: List: 42,500 (1975); 48,000 (1976–1994); 43,000 (1995–2001); 45,814 (2002–2005); 46,721 (2006); 55,000 (2007–2012); 56,800 (2013); 54,800 (2014)
- Surface: Grass (1996–present); AstroTurf (1975–1995)
- Record attendance: 61,500

Construction
- Groundbreaking: October 26, 1973
- Opened: September 20, 1975; 51 years ago
- Renovated: 1997, 2007, 2015
- Expanded: 1976, 1997, 2007, 2015
- Cost: $7.6 million ($45.5 million in 2015 dollars)
- Architects: Finch-Heery & DDDKG Architects; RDG Planning & Designing (renovations)
- General contractor: Huber, Hunt & Nichols

Tenant
- Iowa State Cyclones (NCAA) (1975–present)

Website
- cyclones.com/jack-trice-stadium

Jack Trice Stadium (originally Cyclone Stadium and formerly Jack Trice Field, sometimes referred to as "the Jack") is a stadium located in Ames, Iowa, United States. Primarily used for college football, it is the home field of the Iowa State Cyclones. It is named in honor of Jack Trice, Iowa State's first African American athlete, who died of injuries sustained during a 1923 game against Minnesota. Jack Trice Stadium is currently the only Division I FBS stadium or arena to be named after an African American.

The stadium opened on September 20, 1975, with a 17–12 win over Air Force. It is the second-largest stadium by capacity in the Big 12 Conference behind LaVell Edwards Stadium. Including hillside seats in the corners of the stadium, the facility's official capacity is 61,500. The current record for single-game attendance, 61,500, was set on September 5, 2015, when the Cyclones defeated the University of Northern Iowa 31–7.

Jack Trice Stadium replaced Clyde Williams Field, which had been in use from 1914 through 1974. Williams Field was closed in 1975 and razed in 1978, and Martin and Eaton residence halls now stand on the ground.

== Description ==
The stadium consists of double-decked grandstands running the length of either sideline and encompassing the south end zone. The Richard O. Jacobson Athletic Building, an athletic center built in 1996, is located in the north end zone. The field itself is slightly lower than the surrounding ground. There is a single main concourse for each of the grandstands. A three-level press box on the west side of the stadium was added to the stadium in 1997 for a cost of $6.2 million. Permanent lighting and a large video/scoreboard behind the bleachers in the south end zone were added in 2002. Later in the summer of 2011 a second video/scoreboard was added on the north side. At triple the size of the previous scoreboard, it stands over the Jacobson Athletic Building. Both scoreboards consist of three levels on the inside, with a camera perch on top. The stadium is part of the Iowa State Center, a sports, entertainment and continuing education complex located to the southeast of the university's main campus. North of the stadium is Hilton Coliseum, home to Iowa State Cyclones basketball, wrestling, volleyball and gymnastics teams, as well as other events such as musical festivals, rock concerts and university commencement ceremonies. Iowa State superfan Kyle Lawson has reportedly attended every game held at Jack Trice Stadium, dating back to 1975 (except for two games during the 2020 season that disallowed fans due to the COVID-19 pandemic).

== Jack Trice ==
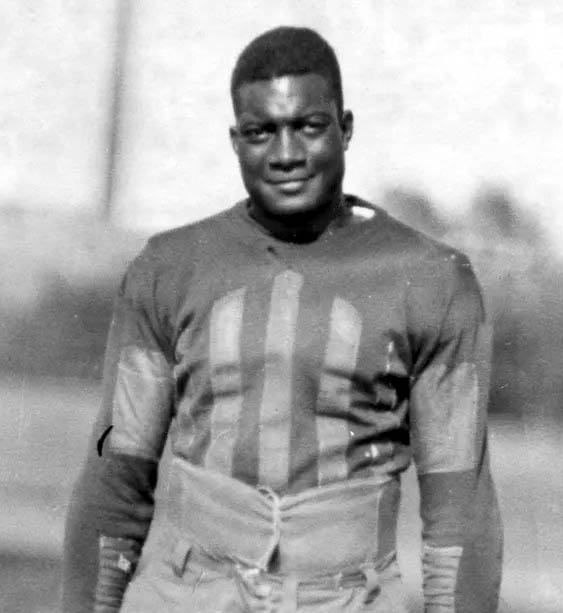
Jack Trice (died prematurely in 1923) was Iowa State's first Afro American athlete

On October 6, 1923, Trice and his Iowa State College teammates played against the University of Minnesota in Minneapolis, Minnesota. Because he was African American, on the night of the game, Trice had to stay at a different Minneapolis hotel from that of his teammates.

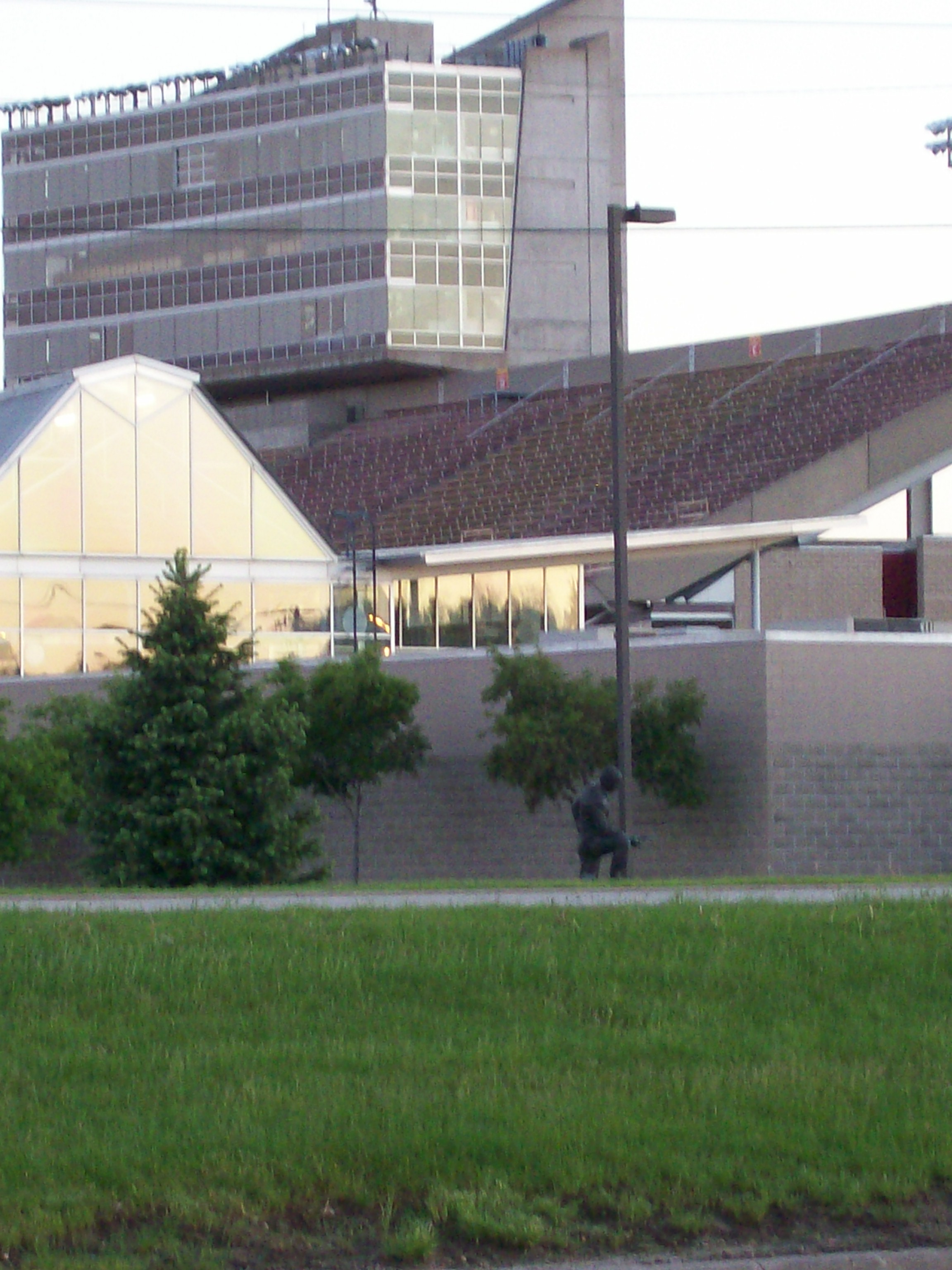
Jack Trice Stadium with statue of Jack Trice in the center of photo, also note the Jacobson and Olsen Building in foreground

During the second play of the game, Trice's collarbone was broken. Trice insisted he was all right and returned to the game. In the third quarter, while attempting to tackle a University of Minnesota ball carrier by throwing a roll block, Trice was trampled by three Minnesota players. Although he claimed to be fine, Trice was removed from the game and sent to a Minneapolis hospital. The doctors declared him fit to travel and he returned by train to Ames with his teammates. On October 8, 1923, Trice died from hemorrhaged lungs and internal bleeding as a result of the injuries sustained during the game.

There was a great deal of speculation surrounding the play that resulted in Jack Trice's death. Many of his teammates claimed after the fact that the Gophers targeted him throughout the first two quarters because of his skin color. ISU teammate Johnny Behm told the Cleveland Plain Dealer in a 1979 interview, "One person told me that nothing out of the ordinary happened. But another who saw it said it was murder."

Trice's funeral was held at the Iowa State College central campus in Ames on October 16, 1923, with 4,000 students and faculty members in attendance. Before he was buried, his casket was draped in Iowa State's school colors, cardinal and gold.

As a result of his death, ISU did not renew their contract to play against Minnesota after the 1924 game. They would not play again until 1989.

Until 1997, the facility itself was known as Cyclone Stadium. Because of persistent requests by the students, the facility was renamed Jack Trice Stadium, making it the only stadium in Division I FBS named for an African American individual.

== Construction ==
=== Initial construction ===
Jack Trice Stadium was completed in less than two years, from its ground breaking on October 26, 1973, to the first game, a victory over Air Force on September 20, 1975. In late 1973 and spring of 1974, heavy earth-moving equipment shaped the embankments. A huge, movable form shaped the lower decks with thousands of cubic yards of concrete. Originally, the stadium had a capacity of 42,500.

=== Previous expansions and renovations ===
==== 1976 ====
In 1976, bleachers were constructed in the end zones to increase the stadium's capacity to more than 46,000 (50,000 with standing room tickets). Before then, all the seating was in the grandstands on the sidelines.

==== 1995–1997 ====
The stadium complex was transformed in 1995–96 with the construction of the state-of-the-art $10.6 million Richard O. Jacobson Athletic Building, in the north end-zone of Jack Trice Stadium. The Jacobson Building is the home of Cyclone athletics containing all sport and administrative offices except men's and women's basketball and volleyball. The Ralph A. Olsen Building was also renovated at that time and it sits attached to the north end of the Jacobson Athletic Building. The Olsen Building, named in honor of prominent Ellsworth farmer and ISU alumnus, houses the strength and conditioning facilities, the team meeting rooms, and the locker rooms.

In 1996, a natural grass field and new drainage system made its debut, the field had been AstroTurf since 1975. In 1997, the $6.2 million, three-level press tower located on the west side was added to Jack Trice Stadium. The new press tower includes press and radio-television levels and nine sky box suites.

==== 2002 ====
The football atmosphere at Jack Trice Stadium was enhanced with the installation of a new million-dollar videoboard and scoreboard which replace its black and white predecessor. Permanent lighting was also added to the side of the stadium for the 2002 season at a cost of $500,000. Since then, ISU has played twice as many home night games as they did the previous 30 years.

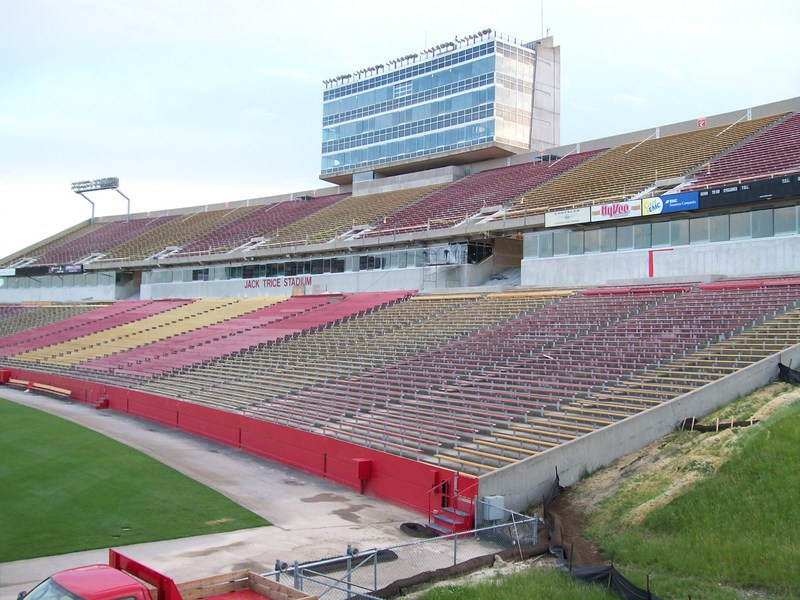
Newly renovated Jack Trice Stadium with new suites between the first and second deck

==== 2007–2009 ====
Between the 2007 and 2009 football seasons, Jack Trice received its largest renovation project to date. With the completion of $30 million in renovations, the stadium has 22 new suites, a new wider concourses with new concessions and bathrooms on the east and west side, a new club section, improved disability seating, new fencing and gates, a new plaza near the main entrance, and many preservative renovations throughout the stadium.

The changes to suites also includes the expansion of two existing suites on the west side of the stadium and the installation of operable windows in all of the current suites. Funding for these renovations came completely from the sale of stadium suites, club seats, increased ticket revenues and fund raising.

Richard O. "Dick" Jacobson donated $5 million to ISU athletics in 2008, for the purpose of continuing renovations to Jack Trice Stadium. There will be a Jacobson Plaza constructed near the stadiums main entrance in his honor. This donation was the largest donation ever made to ISU athletics.

==== 2011 ====
A new video/scoreboard was installed on the north end of Jack Trice Stadium. The screen measures 36 feet high and 79.5 feet wide and has a resolution of 720 x 1,584. The new video board was completed for the 2011 football season.

==== 2015 ====
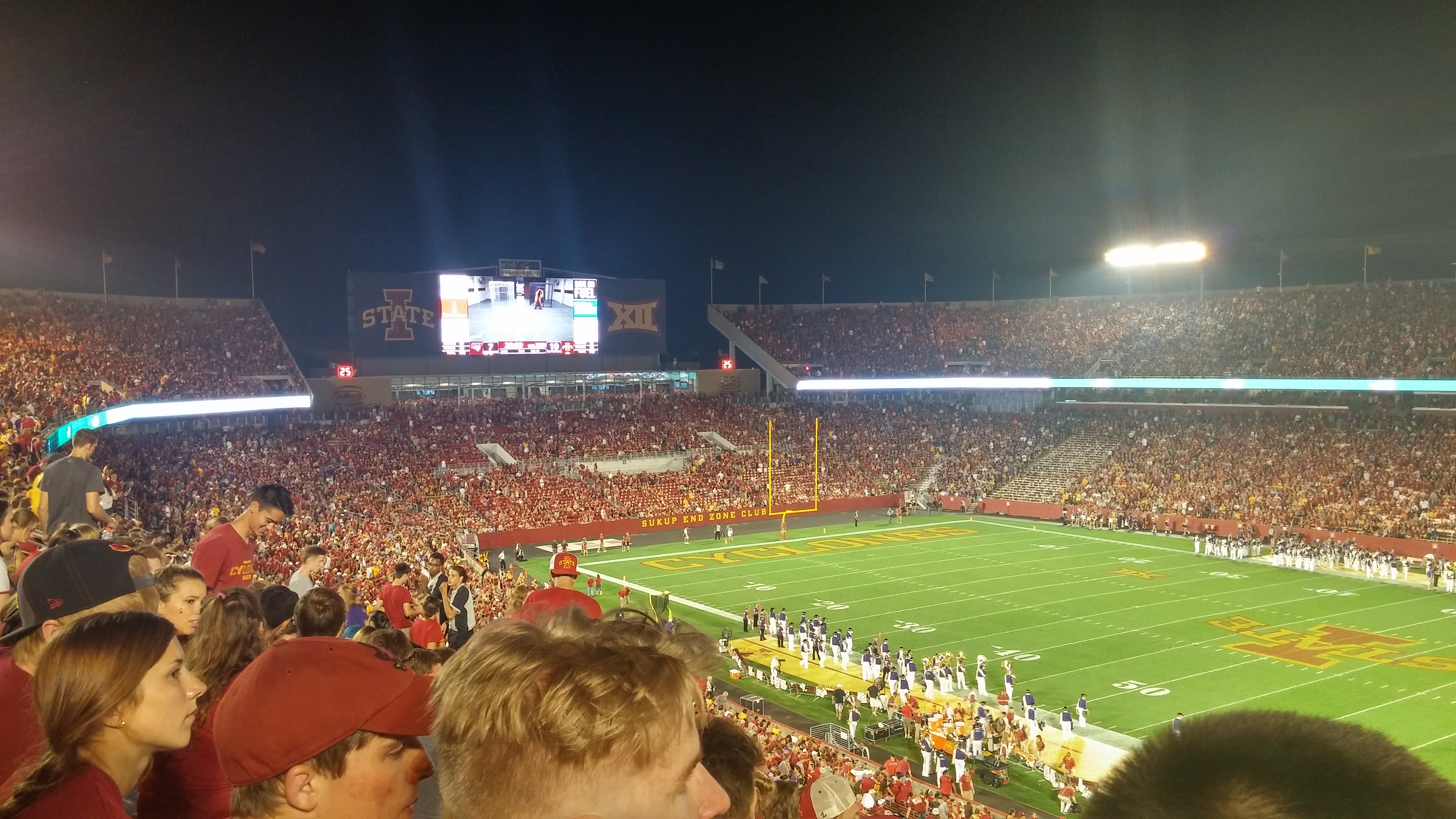
View of Jack Trice Stadium's newly completed South End-Zone Project during a football game vs Northern Iowa.

On May 1, 2008, ISU Athletic Department was given permission from the Iowa Board of Regents to continue planning and fund raising for the Jack Trice Expansion. On November 25, 2013, it was announced that the Reiman family would donate $25 million to help complete the south end-zone project estimated at $60 million. Iowa State Athletics gained approval from the Iowa Board of Regents for the construction of the south end-zone final phase on February 6, 2014. Athletic Director Jamie Pollard has stated the target date of the south end-zone project was to complete the expansion before the start of the 2015 football season. This expansion brought capacity from 54,800 to 61,500.

This south end-zone addition included enclosing the south end zone, which included an upper deck, and connected the east side concourse to the west side concourse. Originally, the south end-zone project was scheduled to be completed at the same time as the east concourse renovation; however, funding was not secured for the south end-zone expansion, so the two projects were completed separately.

On a call-in show, ISU athletic director stated that more facility improvements would be continuing over the next few years. Iowa State's head football coach Paul Rhoads has also made similar comments. The $20.6 million Bergstrom football complex, a state-of-the-art training facility was built between the indoor practice facility and the Jacobson building with opening and dedication in 2012.

In 2014, it was announced that Iowa State would enclose their south end zone. This brought capacity to 61,500 including a lower bowl seating 7,500 and an upper bowl seating 5,800. Included in the lower bowl is a two-story, 40,000 square foot premium club with seating for more than 3,000.

==== 2021 ====
In 2019, construction started on the new 100,000 square foot, $90 million dollar Stark Performance Center, located straight to the northwest of Jack Trice Stadium. The addition added a new football locker room with study and nutrition facilities. As part of the renovation, the Olsen Building located to the north of the Jacobson Building was demolished to make room for a plaza and expanded tailgating space. The spirit walk route for the football players on game-day was adjusted as players now enter the Stark Performance Center. Also a part of the renovation was a concourse expansion which fully completed a walkway around the stadium.

== Sellouts ==
Listed are all sell-outs (61,500) since Jack Trice moved to its current configuration in 2015.

Largest crowds
Attendance	Date	Opponent	Score
61,500 (20 total)	September 5, 2015	Northern Iowa	W 31–7
61,500 (20 total)	September 12, 2015	Iowa	L 17–31
61,500 (20 total)	September 2, 2017	Northern Iowa	W 42–24
61,500 (20 total)	September 9, 2017	Iowa	L 41–44 OT
61,500 (20 total)	November 11, 2017	#15 Oklahoma State	L 42–49
61,500 (20 total)	August 31, 2019	Northern Iowa	W 29–26
61,500 (20 total)	September 14, 2019	#19 Iowa	L 17–18
61,500 (20 total)	October 26, 2019	Oklahoma State	L 27–34
61,500 (20 total)	September 4, 2021	Northern Iowa	W 16–10
61,500 (20 total)	September 11, 2021	#10 Iowa	L 17–27
61,500 (20 total)	October 23, 2021	#8 Oklahoma State	W 24–21
61,500 (20 total)	November 6, 2021	Texas	W 30–7
61,500 (20 total)	September 9, 2023	Iowa	L 13–20
61,500 (20 total)	November 4, 2023	#21 Kansas	L 21–28
61,500 (20 total)	November 18, 2023	#7 Texas	L 16–26
61,500 (20 total)	October 5, 2024	Baylor	W 43–21
61,500 (20 total)	October 19, 2024	UCF	W 38–35
61,500 (20 total)	November 2, 2024	Texas Tech	L 22–23
61,500 (20 total)	August 30, 2025	South Dakota	W 55–7
61,500 (20 total)	September 6, 2025	Iowa	W 16–13
61,500 (20 total)	September 27, 2025	Arizona	W 39–14

== Top 25 wins ==
Listed are the wins by Iowa State over Top 25 teams at Jack Trice Stadium.

Top 25 Wins
Date	ISU Rank	Opponent	Score
November 13, 1976		(9) Nebraska	W 37–28
October 17, 1981		(8) Missouri	W 34–13
November 23, 1985		(7) Oklahoma State	W 15–10
November 14, 1992		(7) Nebraska	W 19–10
November 6, 1993		(18) Kansas State	W 27–23
September 8, 2002	19	(20) Nebraska	W 36–14
September 10, 2005		(8) Iowa	W 23–3
November 12, 2005		(22) Colorado	W 30–16
November 18, 2011		(2) Oklahoma State	W 37–31
October 28, 2017	25	(4) TCU	W 14–7
October 13, 2018		(6) West Virginia	W 30–14
November 16, 2019		(19) Texas	W 23–21
October 3, 2020		(18) Oklahoma	W 37–30
October 23, 2021		(8) Oklahoma State	W 24–21
November 30, 2024	18	(24) Kansas State	W 29–21
October 31, 2026		(24) Oklahoma State	W 51-49

== Football attendance ==
Year	Games	Total	Average	Coach
1975	5	198,869	39,774	Bruce
1976	6	245,885	40,981	Bruce
1977	6	263,362	43,894	Bruce
1978	5	243,500	48,700	Bruce
1979	6	227,900	45,483	Duncan
1980	6	299,584	49,931	Duncan
1981	7	353,800	50,543	Duncan
1982	5	259,531	51,906	Duncan
1983	7	344,943	49,278	Criner
1984	5	246,868	49,374	Criner
1985	8	346,062	43,258	Criner
1986	6	235,074	39,179	Criner, Banker
1987	6	240,990	40,165	Walden
1988	6	262,413	43,736	Walden
1989	6	264,141	44,024	Walden
1990	6	265,627	44,271	Walden
1991	6	253,935	42,323	Walden
1992	6	225,490	37,582	Walden
1993	6	213,303	35,551	Walden
1994	6	212,760	35,460	Walden
1995	7	260,737	37,248	McCarney
1996	6	260,224	43,371	McCarney
1997	5	182,433	36,487	McCarney
1998	6	211,075	35,179	McCarney
1999	6	233,578	38,929	McCarney
2000	6	252,122	42,020	McCarney
2001	6	271,034	45,172	McCarney
2002	7	307,728	43,961	McCarney
2003	7	313,757	44,822	McCarney
2004	7	292,106	41,729	McCarney
2005	6	280,232	46,705	McCarney
2006	7	323,197	46,171	McCarney
2007	7	346,233	49,462	Chizik
2008	6	284,571	47,428	Chizik
2009	6	277,453	46,242	Rhoads
2010	7	317,767	45,395	Rhoads
2011	6	321,880	53,647	Rhoads
2012	7	386,917	55,274	Rhoads
2013	6	332,165	55,361	Rhoads
2014	7	365,377	52,197	Rhoads
2015	6	339,113	56,519	Rhoads
2016	7	367,899	53,557	Campbell
2017	6	347,586	57,931	Campbell
2018	7	392,072	56,010	Campbell
2019	7	418,561	59,794	Campbell
2020	6	55,017	13,754†	Campbell
2021	6	364,221	60,704	Campbell
2022	7	401,411	57,344	Campbell
2023	6	362,305	60,384	Campbell
2024	7	405,185	57,884	Campbell

†Note: Due to the COVID-19 pandemic, Iowa State only allowed restricted attendance at four of six home games. The remaining two games disallowed fans.

== See also ==
- List of NCAA Division I FBS football stadiums
- List of American football stadiums by capacity
- Lists of stadiums
