= List of South Carolina State Bulldogs football seasons =

The following is a list of South Carolina State Bulldogs football seasons for the football team that has represented South Carolina State University in NCAA competition.

== Results ==
Year	Coach	Overall	Conference	Standing	Bowl/playoffs	Rank^{#}
(Independent) (1907)
1907	Unknown	0-1				
Unknown:		0-1				
(No Team) (1908–1914)
(Independent) (1915–1914)
1915		4–0–1				
1916		0–1				
(No Team) (1917–1922)
1923		0-1				
1924		0-2				
1925	W.C. Lewis	0-4				
1926	W.C. Lewis	6-1				
1927	Unknown	8–1				
1928	Unknown	6-1				
1929	Unknown	4-3				
1930	Unknown	7–1-1				
1931	Unknown	1–1–1				
1932	Unknown	5-1–2				
1933	Unknown	5–1–1				
1934	Unknown	5–2-1				
1935	Robert Brooks	3-5				
1936	Robert Brooks	3-3-2				
1937	Robert Brooks	5–3-1				
1938	Robert Brooks	3–5				
1939	Robert Brooks	4-3-1				
1940	Oliver C. Dawson	3–6				
1941	Oliver C. Dawson	4–3-2				
1942	Oliver C. Dawson	3-2-1				
1946	Oliver C. Dawson	5–3-1				
1947	Oliver C. Dawson	7-1-1				
1948	Oliver C. Dawson	4–3-1				
1949	Oliver C. Dawson	3-4-1				
1950	Oliver C. Dawson	1-7-0				
1951	Lawrence Simmons	5-2				
1952	Lawrence Simmons	7-2				
1953	John H. Martin	5-3				
1954	John H. Martin	7-2				
1955	William Brown	3-6				
1956	Roy D. Moore	5-4				
1957	Roy D. Moore	5-2-1				
1958	Roy D. Moore	7-2				
1959	Roy D. Moore	3-5				
1960	William B. Harris	1-7–1				
1961	William B. Harris	2-7				
1962	George Bell	5-3				
1963	George Bell	8-1				
1964	George Bell	7–2				
1965	Oree Banks	8-1				
1966	Oree Banks	7-2				
1967	Oree Banks	7-1				
1968	Oree Banks	7-2				
1969	Oree Banks	5-3-1				
1970	Oree Banks	3-6				
1971	Oree Banks	6–3-1	MEAC			
1972	Oree Banks	1-9	MEAC			
1973	Willie E. Jeffries	7-3-1	MEAC			
1974	Willie E. Jeffries	8–4	MEAC			
1975	Willie E. Jeffries	8-2-1	MEAC			
1976	Willie E. Jeffries	10-1	MEAC			
1977	Willie E. Jeffries	9-1–1	MEAC			
1978	Willie E. Jeffries	8–2-1	MEAC			
1979	Bill Davis	8–3	MEAC			
1980	Bill Davis	10-1	MEAC			
1981	Bill Davis	10-3	MEAC			
1982	Bill Davis	9-3	MEAC			
1983	Bill Davis	7-3	MEAC			
1984	Bill Davis	4–6–1	MEAC			
1985	Bill Davis	5–6	MEAC			
1986	Dennis Thomas	5-6	MEAC			
1987	Dennis Thomas	6-5	MEAC			
1988	Dennis Thomas	4-7	MEAC			
1989	Willie E. Jeffries	5-6	MEAC			
1990	Willie E. Jeffries	4–6	MEAC			
1991	Willie E. Jeffries	7-4	MEAC			
1992	Willie E. Jeffries	7-4	MEAC			
1993	Willie E. Jeffries	8-4	MEAC			
1994	Willie E. Jeffries	10–2	MEAC		W vs. Grambling State Tigers Heritage Bowl	
1995	Willie E. Jeffries	6-4	MEAC			
1996	Willie E. Jeffries	4–6	MEAC			
1997	Willie E. Jeffries	9-3	MEAC		L vs. Southern Jaguars Heritage Bowl	
1998	Willie E. Jeffries	5-6	MEAC			
1999	Willie E. Jeffries	4–6	MEAC			
2000	Willie E. Jeffries	3-8	MEAC			
2001	Willie E. Jeffries	6–5	MEAC			
2002	Oliver "Buddy" Pough	7-5	MEAC			
2003	Buddy Pough	8–4	MEAC			
2004	Buddy Pough	9–2	MEAC	2nd		
2005	Buddy Pough	9-2	MEAC	2nd		
2006	Buddy Pough	7-4	MEAC			
2007	Buddy Pough	7-4	MEAC			
2008	Buddy Pough	10-3	MEAC	1st	L vs Appalachian State 2008 FCS Playoffs	
2009	Buddy Pough	10-2	MEAC	1st	L vs. Appalachian State 2008 FCS Playoffs	
2010	Buddy Pough	9-3	MEAC	2nd	L vs. Georgia Southern 2008 FCS Playoffs	
2011	Buddy Pough	7–4	MEAC			
2012	Buddy Pough	5-6	MEAC			
2013	Buddy Pough	9-4	MEAC	2nd	L vs. Furman 2008 FCS Playoffs	
2014	Buddy Pough	8-4	MEAC			
2015	Buddy Pough	7-4	MEAC			
2016	Buddy Pough	5-6	MEAC			
2017	Buddy Pough	3-7	MEAC			
2018	Buddy Pough	5-6	MEAC			
2019	Buddy Pough	8–3	MEAC			
2020	Buddy Pough	3-1	MEAC			
2021	Buddy Pough	7-5	MEAC	1st	W vs. Jackson State Celebration Bowl	
2022	Buddy Pough	3-8	MEAC			
2023	Buddy Pough	5-6	MEAC	3rd		
2024	Chennis Berry	9-3	MEAC	1st	L vs. Jackson State Celebration Bowl	
2025	Chennis Berry	10-3	MEAC	1st	W vs. Prairie View A&M Celebration Bowl	
Total:		577-364-27				
National championship Conference title Conference division title or championship game berth
^{†}Indicates Bowl Coalition, Bowl Alliance, BCS, or CFP / New Years' Six bowl.; ^{#}Post 1996 rankings from final Sports Network poll.
