= List of Prairie View A&M Panthers in the NFL draft =

This is a list of Prairie View A&M Panthers football players in the NFL draft.

== Key ==
B	Back	K	Kicker	NT	Nose tackle
C	Center	LB	Linebacker	FB	Fullback
DB	Defensive back	P	Punter	HB	Halfback
DE	Defensive end	QB	Quarterback	WR	Wide receiver
DT	Defensive tackle	RB	Running back	G	Guard
E	End	T	Offensive tackle	TE	Tight end

== Selections ==
Year	Round	Pick	Overall	Player	Team	Position
1952	30	8	357	Ray Don Dillon	Detroit Lions	B
1955	6	11	72	Elijah Childers	Detroit Lions	T
1955	16	4	185	Charlie Brackins	Green Bay Packers	QB
1955	28	10	335	Charley Wright	Chicago Bears	E
1956	18	10	215	Earl Payton	Chicago Bears	B
1959	19	5	221	Rufus Granderson	Detroit Lions	T
1960	16	1	181	Jim Lee Hunt	St. Louis Cardinals	T
1960	16	7	187	Bo Farrington	Chicago Bears	E
1964	18	5	243	Carl Robinson	Minnesota Vikings	T
1965	11	11	151	Jim Kearney	Detroit Lions	B
1965	15	7	203	Otis Taylor	Philadelphia Eagles	WR
1965	20	7	273	Ray Johnson	Baltimore Colts	C
1968	11	7	280	Cornelius Cooper	Miami Dolphins	T
1968	13	16	243	Willie Dearion	Chicago Bears	WR
1969	11	23	283	Clarence Williams	Dallas Cowboys	DE
1970	2	9	35	Donnie Williams	Los Angeles Rams	WR
1971	3	2	54	Bivian Lee	New Orleans Saints	DB
1971	15	3	367	Ed Fisher	Philadelphia Eagles	G
1971	17	15	431	Travis Hill	Kansas City Chiefs	DB
1973	5	20	124	Louis Neal	Oakland Raiders	WR
1973	8	20	202	Hise Austin	Green Bay Packers	DB
1974	6	19	149	James Wolf	Pittsburgh Steelers	DE
1974	16	26	416	Jessie Wolf	Miami Dolphins	DT
1980	10	24	273	Matthew Teague	Dallas Cowboys	DE
2019	7	16	230	Quinton Bell	Oakland Raiders	DE
