= Shaquan Davis (American football) =

American football wide receiver (born 2000)

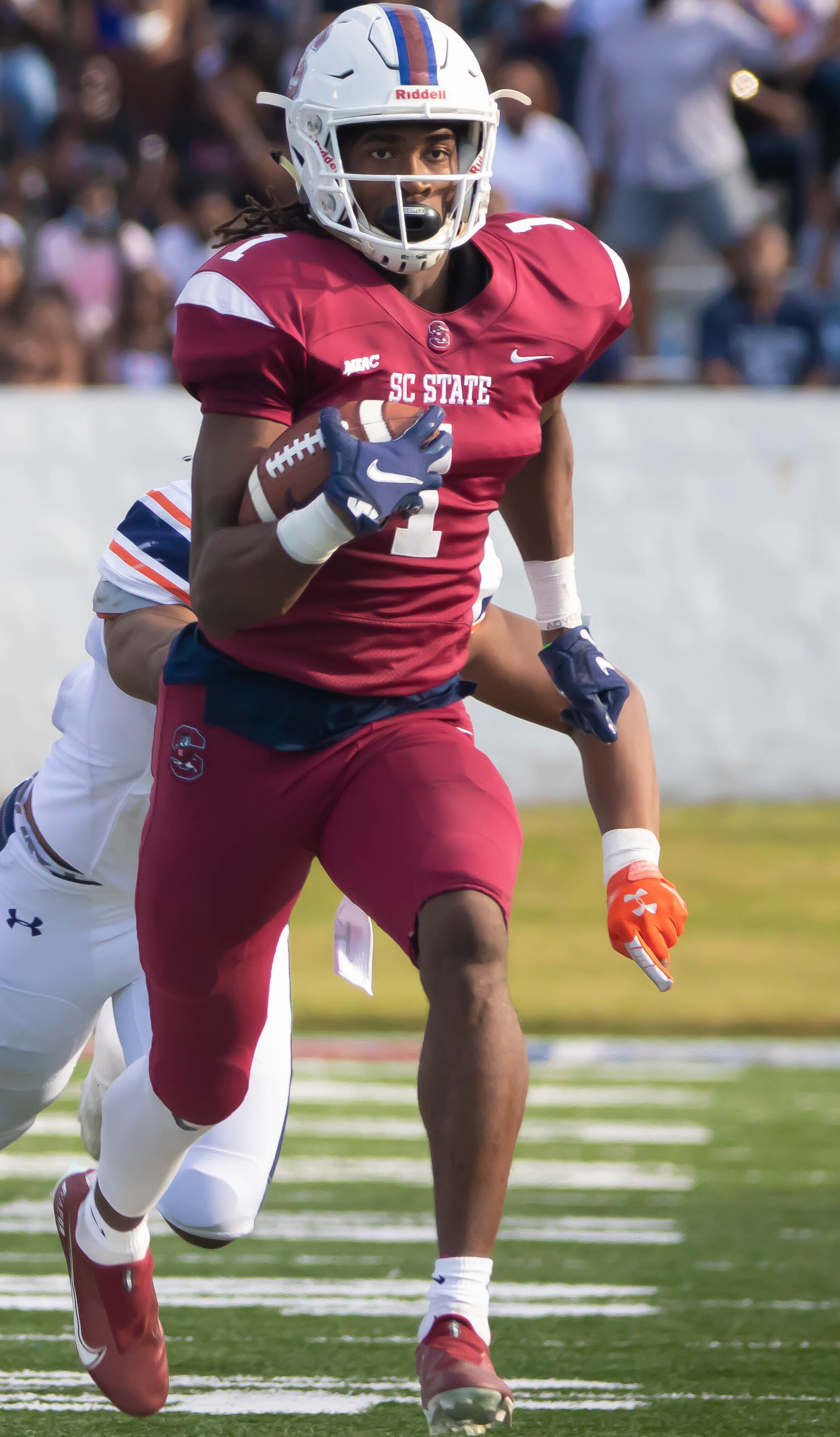
- Davis with the South Carolina State Bulldogs in 2021

Profile
- Position: Wide receiver

Personal information
- Born: February 8, 2000 (age 26); Summerville, South Carolina, U.S.
- Listed height: 6 ft 5 in (1.96 m)
- Listed weight: 215 lb (98 kg)

Career information
- High school: Summerville (Summerville, South Carolina)
- College: South Carolina State (2019–2022)
- NFL draft: 2023: undrafted

Career history
- New Orleans Saints (2023)*; Philadelphia Eagles (2024)*; New Orleans Saints (2024)*; Pittsburgh Steelers (2024)*; DC Defenders (2025)*; Calgary Stampeders (2026)*
- * Offseason or practice squad member only
- Stats at Pro Football Reference

Shaquan "Shaq" Davis (born February 8, 2000) is an American professional football wide receiver. He played college football at South Carolina State.

== Early life ==
Davis was born in Summerville, South Carolina, and attended Summerville High School. In high school, he played football as a wide receiver and basketball as a center.

== College career ==
Davis committed to South Carolina State out of high school. Entering the 2023 NFL draft, he was considered one of the top receivers in the Mid-Eastern Athletic Conference. In the 2021 Celebration Bowl, he recorded five catches for 95 yards and three touchdowns and was named the offensive MVP.

In his final season with the Bulldogs, he recorded 45 receptions for 934 yards and 11 touchdowns.

== Professional career ==
Pre-draft measurables
Height	Weight	Arm length	Hand span	40-yard dash	10-yard split	20-yard split	20-yard shuttle	Three-cone drill	Vertical jump	Broad jump
6 ft 4 1/2 in (1.94 m)	216 lb (98 kg)	35 in (0.89 m)	9 3/8 in (0.24 m)	4.51 s	1.60 s	2.59 s	4.50 s	7.19 s	34 in (0.86 m)	10 ft 10 in (3.30 m)
All values from Pro Day

=== New Orleans Saints (first stint) ===
On April 29, 2023, Davis was signed to the New Orleans Saints as an undrafted free agent after going unselected in the 2023 NFL draft. He was waived by the Saints as a part of final roster cuts on August 29, but was re–signed to their practice squad the next day. On October 9, Davis was placed on injured reserve after suffering through an undisclosed injury. On December, 7, he was reinstated from the practice squad injured reserve. Davis was not signed to a reserve/future contract and thus became a free agent at the end of the season.

=== Philadelphia Eagles ===
On January 18, 2024, Davis signed a reserve/future contract with the Philadelphia Eagles. He was waived by the Eagles on August 7.

=== New Orleans Saints (second stint) ===
On August 11, 2024, Davis signed with the New Orleans Saints. He was waived by New Orleans as a part of final roster cuts on August 27.

=== Pittsburgh Steelers ===
On September 10, 2024, Davis signed was signed to the Pittsburgh Steelers' practice squad. Davis was released by Pittsburgh on September 18.

=== DC Defenders ===
On December 2, 2024, Davis signed with the DC Defenders of the United Football League (UFL). He was released by the Defenders on March 8, 2025.

=== Calgary Stampeders ===
On December 1, 2025, Davis signed with the Calgary Stampeders of the Canadian Football League. He was released by the Stampeders on May 13.
