= South Carolina State Bulldogs football =

American college football organization

2026 South Carolina State Bulldogs football team
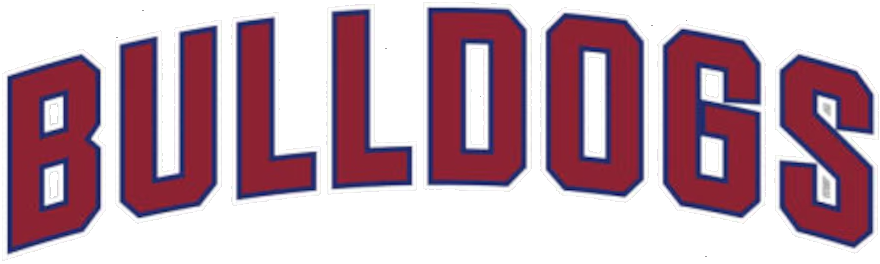
- First season: 1907; 119 years ago (Note: The team was disbanded from 1908 to 1914, then reinstalled. It was canceled once again from 1917 to 1922, and re-launched in 1923; 103 years ago.)
- Head coach: Chennis Berry; 3rd season, 19–6 (.760)
- Location: Orangeburg, South Carolina
- Stadium: Oliver C. Dawson Stadium (capacity: 22,000)
- NCAA division: Division I FCS
- Conference: MEAC
- Colors: Garnet and blue
- All-time record: 582–366–27 (.611)
- Bowl record: 8–8 (.500)

Black college national championships
- 1976, 1977, 1981, 1994, 2009, 2021, 2025

Conference championships
- MEAC: 1974, 1975, 1976, 1977, 1978, 1980, 1981, 1982, 1983, 1994, 2004, 2008, 2009, 2010, 2013, 2014, 2019, 2021, 2024, 2025, 2026
- Rivalries: North Carolina A&T (rivalry)
- Marching band: The Marching 101
- Website: scsuathletics.com

The South Carolina State Bulldogs football team represents South Carolina State University in college football. The Bulldogs play in the NCAA Division I Football Championship Subdivision (FCS) as a member of the Mid-Eastern Athletic Conference (MEAC).

A historically dominant football program, the Bulldogs lead the MEAC in conference championships. The school has produced four players enshrined in the Pro Football Hall of Fame including Harry Carson, Deacon Jones, Marion Motley, and Donnie Shell. Other legendary Bulldog players include Robert Porcher, Shaquille Leonard, Barney Chavous, Charlie Brown and Orlando Brown Sr., Javon Hargrave, Decobie Durant, among others.

Former SC State coach Willie Jeffries became the first African American head coach of a predominantly white Division I-A football program, when he was hired to coach the Wichita State football program in 1979. Jeffries is enshrined in the College Football Hall of Fame.

== History ==
List of South Carolina State Bulldogs football seasons

=== Classifications ===
- 1956–1972: NCAA College Division
- 1967–1969: NAIA
- 1970–1978: NAIA Division I
- 1973–1977: NCAA Division II
- 1978–present: NCAA Division I–AA/FCS

=== Conference memberships ===
- 1907–1928: Independent
- 1929–1934: Southeastern Athletic Conference
- 1935–1970: Southern Intercollegiate Athletic Conference
- 1971–present: Mid-Eastern Athletic Conference

== Bulldogs vs. in-state NCAA Division I schools ==
School	Record	Percentage	Streak	First Meeting	Last Meeting
Charleston Southern	7–2	.778	Lost 2	1991	2026
Clemson	0–5	.000	Lost 5	2008	2021
Coastal Carolina	0–5	.000	Lost 5	2005	2015
Furman	6-12	.333	Won 1	1982	2026
Presbyterian	2–0	1.000	Won 2	1989	1990
South Carolina	0–3	.000	Lost 3	2007	2025
The Citadel	3–5	.375	Lost 2	1989	2026
Wofford	4–6	.400	Won 2	1974	2025
South Carolina State 22 - in-state NCAA Division I Schools 37

== Championships ==
=== National championships ===
The Bulldogs have been awarded a NCAA-recognized black college football national championship seven times in program history.

Year	Coach	Selector	Record	Bowl
1976	Willie Jeffries	ADW, Jet, MBN, NPC	10–1	W Bicentennial Bowl
1977	Willie Jeffries	NPC	9–1–1	W Gold Bowl
1981	Bill Davis	ADW, SBN	10–3	
1994	Willie Jeffries	ADW, BCSP, Heritage Bowl	10–2	W Heritage Bowl
2009	Oliver Pough	ADW, AURN, B-CP, B-MP, BCSP, PCWDC	10–2	
2021	Oliver Pough	B-CP, Celebration Bowl, DCCC-M, HBCUS-UP	7–5	W Celebration Bowl
2025	Chennis Berry	Celebration Bowl	10–3	W Celebration Bowl

=== Conference championships ===
South Carolina State has won Twenty-one Mid-Eastern Athletic Conference titles, twelve outright and eight shared. Asterisk denotes shared title.

Year	Coach	Overall record	Conference record
1974*	Willie Jeffries	8–4	5–1
1975*	Willie Jeffries	8–2–1	5–1
1976*	Willie Jeffries	10–1	5–1
1977	Willie Jeffries	9–1–1	6–0
1978	Willie Jeffries	8–2–1	5–0–1
1980	Bill Davis	10–1	5–0
1981	Bill Davis	10–3	5–0
1982	Bill Davis	9–3	4–1
1983	Bill Davis	7–3	4–0
1994	Willie Jeffries	10–2	6–0
2004*	Oliver Pough	9–2	6–1
2008	Oliver Pough	10–3	8–0
2009	Oliver Pough	10–2	8–0
2010*	Oliver Pough	9–3	7–1
2013*	Oliver Pough	9–4	7–1
2014*	Oliver Pough	8–4	6–2
2019*	Oliver Pough	8–3	6–2
2021	Oliver Pough	7–5	5–0
2024	Chennis Berry	9–3	5–0
2025	Chennis Berry	10–3	5–0
2026	Chennis Berry	9–2	4–0

== Division I-AA/FCS Playoffs results ==
The Bulldogs have appeared in the I-AA/FCS playoffs six times with a record of 2–6.

Season	Round	Opponent	Result
1981	Quarterfinals	Tennessee State	W 26–25 ^{OT}
1981	Semifinals	Idaho State	L 12–41
1982	First round	Furman	W 17–0
1982	Quarterfinals	Louisiana Tech	L 3–38
2008	First round	Appalachian State	L 21–37
2009	First round	Appalachian State	L 13–20
2010	First round	Georgia Southern	L 16–41
2013	First Round	Furman	L 20–30

== Bowl game results ==
The Bulldogs have appeared in 16 bowl games, with a record of 8–8.

Year	Bowl	Opponent	Result
1946	Pecan Bowl	Johnson C. Smith	W 13–6
1947	Pecan Bowl	Allen	W 7–0
1950	Peninsula Bowl	Allen	L 13–47
1973	Orange Blossom Classic	Florida A&M	L 12–23
1974	Textile Bowl	Wofford	L 0–20
1974	Pelican Bowl	Grambling State	L 7–28
1975	Pelican Bowl	Southern	L 12–15
1976	Bicentennial Bowl	Norfolk State	W 26–10
1977	Gold Bowl	Winston-Salem State	W 10–7
1979	Gold Bowl	Norfolk State	W 39–7
1994	Heritage Bowl	Southern	L 0–11
1994	Heritage Bowl	Grambling State	W 31–27
1997	Heritage Bowl	Southern	L 28–34
2021	Celebration Bowl	Jackson State	W 31–10
2024	Celebration Bowl	Jackson State	L 7–28
2025	Celebration Bowl	Prairie View A&M	W 40–38 ^{4OT}

== Pro Football Hall of Fame members ==
Pro Football Hall of Fame members
Player	Pos.	Years at SCSU	Year inducted	Ref.
Harry Carson	LB	1972–1975	2006	
Deacon Jones	DE	1958	1980	
Marion Motley	FB	1939–1940	1968	
Donnie Shell	S	1970–1973	2020	

== College Football Hall of Fame members ==
College Football Hall of Fame members
Player	Pos.	Years at SCSU	Year inducted
Harry Carson	DE	1972–1975	2002
Willie Jeffries	HC	1973–1978, 1989–2001	2010
Donnie Shell	S	1970–1973	1998

== Alumni in the NFL ==
Over 40 South Carolina State alumni have played in the NFL, including:

- Phillip Adams
- Charlie Brown
- Orlando Brown Sr.
- Rafael Bush
- Barney Bussey
- Harry Carson
- Barney Chavous
- Anthony Cook
- Cobie Durant
- John Gilliam
- Javon Hargrave
- Dwayne Harper
- Antonio Hamilton
- Temarrick Hemingway
- Michael Hicks
- Willie Holman
- Deacon Jones
- William Judson
- Angelo King
- James Lee
- Shaquille Leonard
- Marshall McFadden
- Kimario McFadden
- Ervin Parker
- Robert Porcher
- Joe Thomas
- Christian Thompson
- Chuck Darby

== Rivalries ==
SC State has maintained heated rivalries with the North Carolina A&T Aggies, Florida A&M Rattlers, and Bethune-Cookman Wildcats.

== NCAA Record ==
On November 19, 2016, Joe Thomas Sr., father of Green Bay Packers linebacker Joe Thomas, became the oldest player to play in an NCAA Division I game. At 55 years of age, Thomas Sr. had one carry for three yards as a running back in a contest versus Savannah State.

== Future non-conference opponents ==
Announced schedules as of August 11, 2026

2026	2027	2028	2029	2031
Savannah State			vs Alcorn State (Atlanta, GA); MEAC/SWAC Challenge	Florida A&M
vs Florida A&M (Miami Gardens, FL)	at Coastal Carolina			
Virginia State	at Wofford			
at Furman	Furman			
at Bethune–Cookman				
The Citadel				
at Charleston Southern				

== See also ==
- list of black college football classics
