= 1981 South Carolina State Bulldogs football team =

American college football season

1981 South Carolina State Bulldogs football

Black college national champion MEAC champion

NCAA Division I-AA Semifinal, L 12–42 vs. Idaho State
- Conference: Mid-Eastern Athletic Conference

Ranking
- AP: No. 3
- Record: 10–3 (5–0 MEAC)
- Head coach: Bill Davis (3rd season)
- Defensive coordinator: Oliver Pough (1st season)
- Home stadium: Bulldog Stadium

1981 Mid-Eastern Athletic Conference football standings
	Conf.					Overall
Team	W		L		T	W		L		T
No. 3 South Carolina State $^	5	–	0	–	0	10	–	3	–	0
Florida A&M	4	–	1	–	0	7	–	4	–	0
Bethune–Cookman	3	–	2	–	0	6	–	4	–	0
Howard	2	–	3	–	0	6	–	5	–	0
Delaware State	1	–	4	–	0	2	–	9	–	0
North Carolina A&T	0	–	5	–	0	3	–	8	–	0
$ – Conference champion; ^ – NCAA Division I-AA playoff participant; Rankings from NCAA Division I-AA Football Committee poll

The 1981 South Carolina State Bulldogs football team represented South Carolina State University) as a member of the Mid-Eastern Athletic Conference (MEAC) during the 1981 NCAA Division I-AA football season. Led by third-year head coach Bill Davis, the Bulldogs compiled an overall record of 10–3 and a mark of 5–0 in conference play, and finished as MEAC champions.

== Schedule ==
Date	Opponent	Rank	Site	Result	Attendance	Source
September 5	at Eastern Kentucky*		Hanger Field; Richmond, KY	L 0–26	11,400	
September 12	Delaware State		State College Stadium; Orangeburg, SC	W 29–0	8,227	
September 19	North Carolina A&T		State College Stadium; Orangeburg, SC	W 31–6	12,038	
September 26	at Howard		Howard Stadium; Washington, DC	W 34–6	8,500	
October 3	at Alcorn State*	No. T–10	Henderson Stadium; Lorman, MS	L 20–24		
October 10	at Johnson C. Smith*		American Legion Memorial Stadium; Charlotte, NC	W 82–0	5,524	
October 17	Morgan State		State College Stadium; Orangeburg, SC	W 41–3	18,000	
October 24	vs. Florida A&M	No. 8	Miami Orange Bowl; Miami, FL (Orange Blossom Classic)	W 16–15	21,614	
October 31	Morris Brown*	No. 6	State College Stadium; Orangeburg, SC	W 40–6		
November 7	Bethune–Cookman	No. 4	State College Stadium; Orangeburg, SC	W 10–6		
November 14	No. T–10 Grambling State*	No. 3	State College Stadium; Orangeburg, SC	W 30–14		
December 5	No. 6 Tennessee State*	No. 3	State College Stadium; Orangeburg, SC (NCAA Division I-AA Quarterfinal)	W 26–25 ^{OT}	12,000	
December 12	at No. 2 Idaho State*	No. 3	ASISU Minidome; Pocatello, ID (NCAA Division I-AA Semifinal)	L 12–41	12,300	
*Non-conference game; Rankings from NCAA Division I-AA Football Committee Poll released prior to the game

== Roster ==
1981 South Carolina State Bulldogs football team roster
Players
Coaches
Offense

Pos.	#	Name	Class
C	53	Robert Brown	Sr
OT	69	Marion Drummond	Jr
WR	26	Edward Lee	Sr
RB	44	Henry Odom	Jr
WR	22	Zach Thomas	Jr
QB	14	Rodney Whitehead	So

Defense

Pos.	#	Name	Class
DB	8	Barney Bussey	So
DB	27	Tom Tutson	Sr

Special teams

Pos.	#	Name	Class
K	30	Al Gardner	So

Head coach

- Bill Davis

Coordinators/assistant coaches

Legend

- (C) Team captain
- (S) Suspended
- (I) Ineligible
- Injured
- Redshirt

Roster
