= 1980 Southern Jaguars football team =

American college football season

1980 Southern Jaguars football
- Conference: Southwestern Athletic Conference
- Record: 4–6–1 (3–3 SWAC)
- Head coach: Cass Jackson (3rd season)
- Home stadium: University Stadium

1980 Southwestern Athletic Conference football standings
	Conf.					Overall
Team	W		L		T	W		L		T
No. 2 Grambling State +^	5	–	1	–	0	10	–	2	–	0
Jackson State +	5	–	1	–	0	8	–	3	–	0
Alcorn State	3	–	3	–	0	6	–	4	–	0
Mississippi Valley State	3	–	3	–	0	5	–	5	–	0
Southern	3	–	3	–	0	4	–	6	–	1
Texas Southern	2	–	4	–	0	2	–	9	–	0
Prairie View A&M	0	–	6	–	0	2	–	8	–	0
$ – Conference champion; ^ – NCAA Division I-AA playoff participant; Rankings from Associated Press poll

The 1980 Southern Jaguars football team represented Southern University as a member of the Southwestern Athletic Conference (SWAC) during the 1980 NCAA Division I-AA football season. Led by third-year head coach Cass Jackson, the Jaguars compiled an overall record of 4–6–1, with a conference record of 3–3, and finished tied for third in the SWAC.

== Schedule ==
Date	Opponent	Site	Result	Attendance	Source
September 6	at Nevada*	Mackay Stadium; Reno, NV	L 0–20	11,552	
September 20	at Texas Southern	Robertson Stadium; Houston, TX	L 16–19		
September 27	Prairie View A&M	University Stadium; Baton Rouge, LA	W 31–6		
October 4	Mississippi Valley State	University Stadium; Baton Rouge, LA	W 14–11		
October 11	Nicholls State*	University Stadium; Baton Rouge, LA	W 48–0		
October 18	Jackson State	University Stadium; Baton Rouge, LA (rivalry)	L 6–7		
October 25	at Alcorn State	Henderson Stadium; Lorman, MS	W 15–7		
November 1	at Tennessee State*	Dudley Field; Nashville, TN	L 9–49	28,000	
November 8	Howard*	University Stadium; Baton Rouge, LA	T 3–3		
November 15	Florida A&M*	University Stadium; Baton Rouge, LA	L 7–13		
November 29	vs. No. 2 Grambling State	Louisiana Superdome; New Orleans, LA (Bayou Classic)	L 6–43	72,000	
*Non-conference game; Rankings from AP Poll released prior to the game
