= 1980 Prairie View A&M Panthers football team =

American college football season

1980 Prairie View A&M Panthers football
- Conference: Southwestern Athletic Conference
- Record: 2–8 (0–6 SWAC)
- Head coach: Cornelius Cooper (1st season)
- Home stadium: Edward L. Blackshear Field

1980 Southwestern Athletic Conference football standings
	Conf.					Overall
Team	W		L		T	W		L		T
No. 2 Grambling State +^	5	–	1	–	0	10	–	2	–	0
Jackson State +	5	–	1	–	0	8	–	3	–	0
Alcorn State	3	–	3	–	0	6	–	4	–	0
Mississippi Valley State	3	–	3	–	0	5	–	5	–	0
Southern	3	–	3	–	0	4	–	6	–	1
Texas Southern	2	–	4	–	0	2	–	9	–	0
Prairie View A&M	0	–	6	–	0	2	–	8	–	0
$ – Conference champion; ^ – NCAA Division I-AA playoff participant; Rankings from Associated Press poll

The 1980 Prairie View A&M Panthers football team represented Prairie View A&M University as a member of the Southwestern Athletic Conference (SWAC) during the 1980 NCAA Division I-AA football season. Led by first-year head coach Cornelius Cooper, the Panthers compiled an overall record of 2–8, with a conference record of 0–6, and finished seventh in the SWAC.

== Schedule ==
Date	Opponent	Site	Result	Attendance	Source
September 6	vs. Southwest Texas State*	Alamo Stadium; San Antonio, TX	L 0–49	3,200	
September 20	at Jackson State	Mississippi Veterans Memorial Stadium; Jackson, MS	L 6–57		
September 27	at Southern	University Stadium; Baton Rouge, LA	L 6–31		
October 4	Grambling State	Edward L. Blackshear Field; Prairie View, TX (rivalry)	L 0–68	6,100	
October 11	at Bishop*	P.C. Cobb Stadium; Dallas, TX	L 0–12		
October 18	Texas Lutheran*	Edward L. Blackshear Field; Prairie View, TX	W 3–0		
November 1	at Mississippi Valley State	Bulldog Stadium; Greenwood, MS	L 7–47		
November 8	Arkansas–Pine Bluff*	Edward L. Blackshear Field; Prairie View, TX	W 9–7		
November 15	Alcorn State	Edward L. Blackshear Field; Prairie View, TX	L 11–38		
November 22	at Texas Southern	Robertson Stadium; Houston, TX (rivalry)	L 6–21		
*Non-conference game
