= 1981 Delaware State Hornets football team =

American college football season

1981 Delaware State Hornets football
- Conference: Mid-Eastern Athletic Conference
- Record: 2–9 (1–4 MEAC)
- Head coach: Joe Purzycki (1st season)
- Defensive coordinator: Bill Collick (1st season)
- Home stadium: Alumni Stadium

1981 Mid-Eastern Athletic Conference football standings
	Conf.					Overall
Team	W		L		T	W		L		T
No. 3 South Carolina State $^	5	–	0	–	0	10	–	3	–	0
Florida A&M	4	–	1	–	0	7	–	4	–	0
Bethune–Cookman	3	–	2	–	0	6	–	4	–	0
Howard	2	–	3	–	0	6	–	5	–	0
Delaware State	1	–	4	–	0	2	–	9	–	0
North Carolina A&T	0	–	5	–	0	3	–	8	–	0
$ – Conference champion; ^ – NCAA Division I-AA playoff participant; Rankings from NCAA Division I-AA Football Committee poll

The 1981 Delaware State Hornets football team represented Delaware State College (now known as Delaware State University) as a member of the Mid-Eastern Athletic Conference (MEAC) during the 1981 NCAA Division I-AA football season. Led by first-year head coach Joe Purzycki, the Hornets compiled an overall record of 2–9, with a mark of 1–4 in conference play, and finished fifth in the MEAC.

== Schedule ==
Date	Opponent	Site	Result	Attendance	Source
September 5	at Virginia State*	Rogers Stadium; Petersburg, VA	L 12–13	3,500	
September 12	at South Carolina State	State College Stadium; Orangeburg, SC	L 0–29	8,227	
September 19	at Florida A&M	Bragg Memorial Stadium; Tallahassee, FL	L 3–27	13,081	
September 26	West Chester State*	Alumni Stadium; Dover, DE	L 16–19		
October 3	Bethune–Cookman	Alumni Stadium; Dover, DE	L 0–8		
October 10	Howard	Alumni Stadium; Dover, DE	L 27–31		
October 17	North Carolina A&T	Alumni Stadium; Dover, DE	W 21–17		
October 31	Towson State*	Alumni Stadium; Dover, DE	L 10–24		
November 7	at Salisbury State*	Sea Gull Stadium; Salisbury, MD	L 7–13		
November 14	at Central State (OH)*	McPherson Stadium; Wilberforce, OH	W 13–6		
November 21	at Eastern Illinois*	O'Brien Field; Charleston, IL	L 16–24		
*Non-conference game
