= Bill Davis (coach) =

American football player and coach (1941–2002)

Biographical details
- Born: December 4, 1941; Union, South Carolina, U.S.
- Died: March 17, 2002 (aged 60); Savannah, Georgia, U.S.

Playing career
- 1961–1965: Johnson C. Smith

Coaching career (HC unless noted)
- 1965: Sims HS (NC)
- 1966–1968: Maryland State (assistant)
- 1969–1972: Johnson C. Smith (assistant)
- 1973–1978: South Carolina State (assistant)
- 1979–1985: South Carolina State
- 1986–1992: Savannah State
- 1993–1995: Tennessee State
- 1997–1998: Johnson C. Smith
- 2000–2001: Savannah State

Administrative career (AD unless noted)
- 1990–1993: Savannah State

Head coaching record
- Overall: 123–100–1 (college)
- Bowls: 1-0
- Tournaments: 1–1 (NCAA D-I-AA playoffs); 0–1 (NCAA D-II playoffs)

Accomplishments and honors

Championships
- 2× black college national (1980–1981); 4× MEAC (1980–1983)

Awards
- 2× MEAC Coach of the Year (1980–1981)

William R. Davis (December 4, 1941 – March 17, 2002) was an American football coach. He served as the head football coach at South Carolina State University, Savannah State University, Tennessee State University, and Johnson C. Smith University. Davis won four conference championships and made two appearances in the NCAA Division I-AA playoffs at South Carolina State. Under Davis, Savannah State posted its only appearance in the NCAA Division II playoffs.

== Early life ==
Davis was the son of Lee Davis, Sr. truck driver, and Gertrude Stevens-Davis, a domestic housekeeper, and the youngest of three children. He graduated from Sims High School in 1961, where he was an exceptional athlete, lettering in all sports. He earned a four-year scholarship that same year to attend Johnson C. Smith University in Charlotte, North Carolina, and was coached under the leadership of Eddie McGirt; it was at Johnson C. Smith that Davis was an all CIAA standout in football.

Upon graduation from college, Davis returned to his hometown to coach at Sims High School for a year. In 1966, Davis was hired by Sandy Gilliam to coach at Maryland State College—now known as the University of Maryland Eastern Shore—where he served until 1969 to return to his alma mater Johnson C. Smith University where he worked with his college coach and mentor Eddie McGirt for four seasons. In 1973, Davis went to work alongside his childhood friend Willie Jeffries at South Carolina State College—now known as South Carolina State University—where he worked with Jefferies for six seasons until Jefferies took the post at Wichita State University in 1979. It was Davis that succeeded Jefferies to coach the Bulldogs until 1986.

On August 20, 1966 he married Amy Ozzietta Thompson (August 30, 1941 – October 22, 2010) at Charlotte, N.C., to that union two children were born, William Robert, Jr., and Tomeka Mamette.

== Coaching career ==
=== South Carolina State ===
Davis served as an assistant coach for Willie Jeffries for six seasons (1973–1978) before succeeding Jeffries as the Bulldogs head coach in 1979. Davis was the head football coach at South Carolina State University from 1979 until 1985 and compiled a 53–25–1 record as head coach. The team's 10–1 record in 1980 resulted in a Mid-Eastern Athletic Conference (MEAC) championship. In 1981 the team completed the season with a 10–3 record and was named the black college football national champions and the MEAC champion. The 1982 team record was 9–3 and resulted in a third consecutive MEAC title. The 1983 team's record was 7–3 and won another MEAC title.

=== Savannah State ===
Davis served as the head football coach at Savannah State College from 1986 to 1992 and Savannah State University from 2000 until his death in 2002 . Under Davis, the Tigers compiled a 52–40 record and posted their only appearance in the NCAA Division II playoffs in 1992.

=== Tennessee State ===
Davis was the 17th head coach at Tennessee State University in Nashville, Tennessee, serving for three seasons, from 1993 to 1995. His record at Tennessee State was 11–22.

=== Johnson C. Smith ===
Davis became head coach at Johnson C. Smith in 1997, serving for two seasons. His record was 8–12.

== Head coaching record ==
Year	Team	Overall	Conference	Standing	Bowl/playoffs	NCAA^{#}	AFCA^{°}
South Carolina State Bulldogs (Mid-Eastern Athletic Conference) (1979–1985)
1979	South Carolina State	8–3	4–1	2nd	W Gold Bowl		
1980	South Carolina State	10–1	5–0	1st		T–3	
1981	South Carolina State	10–3	5–0	1st	L NCAA Division I-AA Semifinal	3	
1982	South Carolina State	9–3	4–1	1st	L NCAA Division I-AA Quarterfinal	7	
1983	South Carolina State	7–3	4–0	1st		18	
1984	South Carolina State	4–6–1	2–2	3rd			
1985	South Carolina State	5–6	2–2	3rd			
South Carolina State:		53–25–1	26–6				
Savannah State Tigers (Southern Intercollegiate Athletic Conference) (1986–1992)
1986	Savannah State	6–4	4–3				
1987	Savannah State	4–6	3–4				
1988	Savannah State	7–3	6–1	T–2nd			
1989	Savannah State	8–1	0–0	NA			
1990	Savannah State	7–4	5–2	3rd			
1991	Savannah State	7–4	4–3	6th			
1992	Savannah State	8–4	5–2	3rd	L NCAA Division II First Round		T–20
Tennessee State Tigers (Ohio Valley Conference) (1993–1995)
1993	Tennessee State	4–7	4–4	T–4th			
1994	Tennessee State	5–6	4–4	T–4th			
1995	Tennessee State	2–9	1–7	T–8th			
Tennessee State:		11–22	9–15				
Johnson C. Smith Golden Bulls (Central Intercollegiate Athletic Association) (1997–1998)
1997	Johnson C. Smith	2–8	1–6	T–8th			
1998	Johnson C. Smith	6–4	4–3	T–3rd			
Johnson C. Smith:		8–12	5–9				
Savannah State Tigers (NCAA Division I-AA independent) (2000–2001)
2000	Savannah State	2–8					
2001	Savannah State	2–7					
Savannah State:		51–41	27–15				
Total:		123–100–1					
National championship Conference title Conference division title or championship game berth
