= Floyd Keith =

American football coach

Biographical details
- Born: August 22, 1948 (age 78); St. Marys, Ohio, U.S.

Coaching career (HC unless noted)
- 1970–1973: Miami (OH) (assistant)
- 1974–1978: Colorado (OB/WR)
- 1979–1982: Howard
- 1983: Arizona (assistant)
- 1984–1992: Indiana (assistant)
- 1993–1999: Rhode Island

Head coaching record
- Overall: 46–70–2

Accomplishments and honors

Championships
- 1 Yankee New England Division (1995)

Floyd A. Keith (born August 22, 1948) is an American former football coach. He served as the head football coach at Howard University from 1979 to 1982 and at the University of Rhode Island from 1993 to 1999, compiling a career college football record of 46–70–2. He was a college football coach for 30 years, from 1970 to 1999. Keith was the executive director of the Black Coaches Association from 2001 to 2013. In 2013, he became the CEO of PPA Professional Services, a professional development and consulting group. Folling his football career he had a stint as a sales manager for the Indianapolis Marriott East hotel in Indianapolis, Indiana. His current position is unknown.

== Coaching career ==
After graduating from Ohio Northern University in 1970, Keith was hired as an assistant at Miami University in Oxford, Ohio under head coach Bill Mallory. He was placed in charge of the wingbacks and split ends, replacing Tirrel Burton, who had moved on to the University of Michigan.

== Head coaching record ==
Year	Team	Overall	Conference	Standing	Bowl/playoffs
Howard Bison (Mid-Eastern Athletic Conference) (1979–1982)
1979	Howard	5–6	2–3	4th	
1980	Howard	6–2–2	2–2–1	T–3rd	
1981	Howard	6–4	2–3	4th	
1982	Howard	6–5	2–3	T–4th	
Howard:		23–17–2	8–11–1		
Rhode Island Rams (Yankee Conference) (1993–1996)
1993	Rhode Island	4–7	2–6	5th (New England)	
1994	Rhode Island	2–9	2–6	T–5th (New England)	
1995	Rhode Island	7–4	6–2	1st (New England)	
1996	Rhode Island	4–6	2–6	5th (New England)	
Rhode Island Rams (Atlantic 10 Conference) (1997–1999)
1997	Rhode Island	2–9	2–6	4th (New England)	
1998	Rhode Island	3–8	2–6	5th (New England)	
1999	Rhode Island	1–10	1–7	10th	
Rhode Island:		23–53	17–39		
Total:		46–70–2			
National championship Conference title Conference division title or championship game berth
