= 1980 Howard Bison football team =

American college football season

1980 Howard Bison football
- Conference: Mid-Eastern Athletic Conference
- Record: 6–2–2 (2–2–1 MEAC)
- Head coach: Floyd Keith (2nd season)
- Home stadium: Howard Stadium; RFK Stadium

1980 Mid-Eastern Athletic Conference football standings
	Conf.					Overall
Team	W		L		T	W		L		T
No. T–3 South Carolina State $	5	–	0	–	0	10	–	1	–	0
North Carolina A&T	3	–	2	–	0	9	–	3	–	0
Howard	2	–	2	–	1	6	–	2	–	2
Bethune–Cookman	2	–	2	–	1	5	–	4	–	1
Florida A&M	2	–	3	–	0	5	–	6	–	0
Delaware State	0	–	5	–	0	2	–	9	–	0
$ – Conference champion; Rankings from Associated Press poll

The 1980 Howard Bison football team represented Howard University as a member of the Mid-Eastern Athletic Conference (MEAC) during the 1980 NCAA Division I-AA football season. Led by second-year head coach Floyd Keith, the Bison compiled an overall record of 6–2–2, with a mark of 2–2–1 in conference play, and finished tied for third in the MEAC.

== Schedule ==
Date	Opponent	Site	Result	Attendance	Source
September 13	at West Virginia State*	Charleston, WV	W 19–6		
September 20	Bethune–Cookman	Howard Stadium; Washington, DC	T 13–13	7,000	
September 27	at No. T–3 South Carolina State	State College Stadium; Orangeburg, SC	L 17–30	9,000	
October 4	vs. Florida A&M	Gator Bowl Stadium; Jacksonville, FL	L 25–42	24,873	
October 11	Delaware State	RFK Stadium; Washington, DC	W 49–7	11,000	
October 18	at Virginia State*	Rogers Stadium; Ettrick, VA	W 38–14	4,100	
October 25	North Carolina A&T	Howard Stadium; Washington, DC	W 35–14		
November 1	at Hampton*	Armstrong Stadium; Hampton, VA (rivalry)	W 38–21	5,259	
November 8	at Southern*	University Stadium; Baton Rouge, LA	T 3–3		
November 22	Morgan State*	Howard Stadium; Washington, DC (rivalry)	W 51–6	8,700	
*Non-conference game; Rankings from AP Poll released prior to the game
