= 1980 Delaware State Hornets football team =

American college football season

1980 Delaware State Hornets football
- Conference: Mid-Eastern Athletic Conference
- Record: 2–9 (0–5 MEAC)
- Head coach: Charles Henderson (2nd season)
- Home stadium: Alumni Stadium

1980 Mid-Eastern Athletic Conference football standings
	Conf.					Overall
Team	W		L		T	W		L		T
No. T–3 South Carolina State $	5	–	0	–	0	10	–	1	–	0
North Carolina A&T	3	–	2	–	0	9	–	3	–	0
Howard	2	–	2	–	1	6	–	2	–	2
Bethune–Cookman	2	–	2	–	1	5	–	4	–	1
Florida A&M	2	–	3	–	0	5	–	6	–	0
Delaware State	0	–	5	–	0	2	–	9	–	0
$ – Conference champion; Rankings from Associated Press poll

The 1980 Delaware State Hornets football team represented Delaware State College (now known as Delaware State University) as a member of the Mid-Eastern Athletic Conference (MEAC) during the 1980 NCAA Division I-AA football season. Led by second-year head coach Charles Henderson, the Hornets compiled an overall record of 2–9, with a mark of 0–5 in conference play, and finished sixth in the MEAC.

== Schedule ==
Date	Opponent	Site	Result	Attendance	Source
September 6	Salisbury*	Alumni Stadium; Dover, DE	L 18–27	4,100	
September 13	South Carolina State	Alumni Stadium; Dover, DE	L 20–21		
September 20	District of Columbia*	Alumni Stadium; Dover, DE	W 8–6		
September 27	at No. T–10 UMass*	Alumni Stadium; Hadley, MA	L 0–39	9,700	
October 4	at Bethune–Cookman	Memorial Stadium; Daytona Beach, FL	L 20–37	5,109	
October 11	at Howard	RFK Stadium; Washington, DC	L 7–49	11,000	
October 18	at North Carolina A&T	World War Memorial Stadium; Greensboro, NC	L 0–52	20,030	
November 1	at Towson State*	Towson Stadium; Towson, MD	L 0–30		
November 8	at Portland State*	Civic Stadium; Portland, OR	L 0–105	4,772	
November 15	Central State (OH)*	Alumni Stadium; Dover, DE	W 20–14		
November 22	at Florida A&M	Doak Campbell Stadium; Tallahassee, FL	L 7–59		
*Non-conference game; Rankings from AP Poll released prior to the game
