= Bobby Frazier =

American football player and coach (born 1943)

Biographical details
- Born: January 20, 1943 (age 83); Miami, Florida, U.S.

Playing career
- 1960–1963: Bethune–Cookman
- Position: Quarterback

Coaching career (HC unless noted)
- 1973–1978: Bethune–Cookman (assistant)
- 1979–1982: Bethune–Cookman
- 1983: District of Columbia (OC)
- 1984–1989: District of Columbia

Head coaching record
- Overall: 31–67–3

Bobby Frazier (born January 20, 1943) is an American former football coach and player. He served as the head football coach at Bethune–Cookman University from 1979 through 1982 and at the University of the District of Columbia (UDC) from 1984 to 1989. As a head coach, Frazier compiled an overall record of 31 wins, 67 losses and 3 ties (31–67–3)

Frazier played quarterback for Bethune–Cookman from 1960 through 1963. During his career as the Wildcats' quarterback, he established many passing records with his 89-yard completion to George Williams against Benedict College in 1962 still being the longest pass play in the history of the program. Following his college career, Frazier played several seasons in minor league baseball, advancing as high as the Phoenix Giants of the Pacific Coast League before beginning his football coaching career.

After serving as an assistant coach from 1973 to 1978, on February 14, 1979, Frazier was promoted to head coach following the resignation of Andy Hinson. During his tenure as the Wildcats head coach, he compiled an overall record of 24 wins, 17 losses and 1 tie (24–17–1). He resigned his position in December 1982 following an internal investigation over player treatment and athletic funding.

In 1984, Frazier returned to the head coaching ranks for the UDC Firebirds. During his tenure from 1984 to 1989, he compiled an overall record of 7 wins, 50 losses and 2 ties (7–50–2). He was fired from his post following the 1989 season, with the UDC program being disbanded altogether for the 1990 season. Presently, Dr. Frazier is a professor at Edward Waters College in Jacksonville, Florida

== Head coaching record ==
Year	Team	Overall	Conference	Standing	Bowl/playoffs
Bethune–Cookman Wildcats (Southern Intercollegiate Athletic Conference) (1979)
1979	Bethune–Cookman	6–5	2–2		
Bethune–Cookman Wildcats (Mid-Eastern Athletic Conference) (1980–1982)
1980	Bethune–Cookman	6–3–1	2–2–1	T–3rd	
1981	Bethune–Cookman	7–4	3–2	3rd	
1982	Bethune–Cookman	5–5	3–2	3rd	
Bethune–Cookman:		24–17–1	10–8–1		
District of Columbia Firebirds () (1984–1989)
1984	District of Columbia	0–8–1			
1985	District of Columbia	2–8			
1986	District of Columbia	3–7–1			
1987	District of Columbia	0–9			
1988	District of Columbia	0–10			
1989	District of Columbia	2–8			
District of Columbia:		7–50–2			
Total:		31–67–3			
