= 1981 Howard Bison football team =

American college football season

1981 Howard Bison football
- Conference: Mid-Eastern Athletic Conference
- Record: 6–4 (2–3 MEAC)
- Head coach: Floyd Keith (3rd season)
- Home stadium: Howard Stadium; RFK Stadium

1981 Mid-Eastern Athletic Conference football standings
	Conf.					Overall
Team	W		L		T	W		L		T
No. 3 South Carolina State $^	5	–	0	–	0	10	–	3	–	0
Florida A&M	4	–	1	–	0	7	–	4	–	0
Bethune–Cookman	3	–	2	–	0	6	–	4	–	0
Howard	2	–	3	–	0	6	–	5	–	0
Delaware State	1	–	4	–	0	2	–	9	–	0
North Carolina A&T	0	–	5	–	0	3	–	8	–	0
$ – Conference champion; ^ – NCAA Division I-AA playoff participant; Rankings from NCAA Division I-AA Football Committee poll

The 1981 Howard Bison football team represented Howard University as a member of the Mid-Eastern Athletic Conference (MEAC) during the 1981 NCAA Division I-AA football season. Led by third-year head coach Floyd Keith, the Bison compiled an overall record of 6–4, with a mark of 2–3 in conference play, and finished fourth in the MEAC.

== Schedule ==
Date	Opponent	Site	Result	Attendance	Source
September 12	Cheyney*	Howard Stadium; Washington, DC	W 33–23		
September 19	at Bethune–Cookman	Memorial Stadium; Daytona Beach, FL	L 13–19		
September 26	South Carolina State	Howard Stadium; Washington, DC	L 6–34	8,500	
October 3	Florida A&M	Howard Stadium; Washington, DC	L 7–31	4,500	
October 10	at Delaware State	Alumni Stadium; Dover, DE	W 31–27		
October 17	Virginia State*^{†}	RFK Stadium; Washington, DC	W 26–14	7,000	
October 24	at North Carolina A&T	Aggie Stadium; Greensboro, NC	W 21–17	5,100	
October 31	Norfolk State*	Howard Stadium; Washington, DC	W 49–28	9,500	
November 14	at Western Illinois*	Hanson Field; Macomb, IL	L 17–20		
November 21	at Morgan State	Hughes Stadium; Baltimore, MD (rivalry)	W 35–32	2,000	
*Non-conference game; ^{†}Homecoming
