= 1980 Texas Southern Tigers football team =

American college football season

1980 Texas Southern Tigers football
- Conference: Southwestern Athletic Conference
- Record: 2–9 (2–4 SWAC)
- Head coach: Jim Sorey (2nd season)
- Home stadium: Robertson Stadium; Astrodome

1980 Southwestern Athletic Conference football standings
	Conf.					Overall
Team	W		L		T	W		L		T
No. 2 Grambling State +^	5	–	1	–	0	10	–	2	–	0
Jackson State +	5	–	1	–	0	8	–	3	–	0
Alcorn State	3	–	3	–	0	6	–	4	–	0
Mississippi Valley State	3	–	3	–	0	5	–	5	–	0
Southern	3	–	3	–	0	4	–	6	–	1
Texas Southern	2	–	4	–	0	2	–	9	–	0
Prairie View A&M	0	–	6	–	0	2	–	8	–	0
$ – Conference champion; ^ – NCAA Division I-AA playoff participant; Rankings from Associated Press poll

The 1980 Texas Southern Tigers football team represented Texas Southern University as a member of the Southwestern Athletic Conference (SWAC) during the 1980 NCAA Division I-AA football season. Led by second-year head coach Jim Sorey, the Tigers compiled an overall record of 2–9, with a mark of 2–4 in conference play, and finished sixth in the SWAC.

== Schedule ==
Date	Opponent	Site	Result	Attendance	Source
September 6	Lamar*	Robertson Stadium; Houston, TX	L 8–41	9,300	
September 13	vs. Bethune–Cookman*	Gator Bowl Stadium; Jacksonville, FL	L 0–10	10,000	
September 20	Southern	Robertson Stadium; Houston, TX	W 19–16		
September 27	vs. Tennessee State*	Farrington Field; Fort Worth, TX	L 3–13	2,000	
October 4	at Texas A&I*	Javelina Stadium; Kingsville, TX	L 14–33		
October 11	at Alcorn State	Henderson Stadium; Lorman, MS	L 3–24		
October 18	at Southeastern Louisiana*	Strawberry Stadium; Hammond, LA	L 6–47		
October 25	Mississippi Valley State	Robertson Stadium; Houston, TX	L 12–20		
November 1	No. T–7 Grambling State	Astrodome; Houston, TX	L 14–43		
November 8	at Jackson State	Mississippi Veterans Memorial Stadium; Jackson, MS	L 7–50	12,000	
November 22	Prairie View A&M	Robertson Stadium; Houston, TX (rivalry)	W 21–6		
*Non-conference game; Rankings from Associated Press Poll released prior to the game
