= 1980 Florida A&M Rattlers football team =

American college football season

1980 Florida A&M Rattlers football
- Conference: Mid-Eastern Athletic Conference
- Record: 5–6 (2–3 MEAC)
- Head coach: Rudy Hubbard (7th season)
- Home stadium: Doak Campbell Stadium

1980 Mid-Eastern Athletic Conference football standings
	Conf.					Overall
Team	W		L		T	W		L		T
No. T–3 South Carolina State $	5	–	0	–	0	10	–	1	–	0
North Carolina A&T	3	–	2	–	0	9	–	3	–	0
Howard	2	–	2	–	1	6	–	2	–	2
Bethune–Cookman	2	–	2	–	1	5	–	4	–	1
Florida A&M	2	–	3	–	0	5	–	6	–	0
Delaware State	0	–	5	–	0	2	–	9	–	0
$ – Conference champion; Rankings from Associated Press poll

The 1980 Florida A&M Rattlers football team represented Florida A&M University as a member of the Mid-Eastern Athletic Conference (MEAC) during the 1980 NCAA Division I-AA football season. Led by seventh-year head coach Rudy Hubbard, the Rattlers compiled an overall record of 5–6, with a mark of 2–3 in conference play, and finished fifth in the MEAC.

Because of the condemnation of Bragg Memorial Stadium, the team shared Doak Campbell Stadium with Florida State University, two miles to the north, for the season after playing numerous larger-draw games at Doak Campbell during the previous years.

== Schedule ==
Date	Opponent	Site	Result	Attendance	Source
September 13	at Miami (FL)*	Miami Orange Bowl; Miami, FL	L 0–49	20,007	
September 19	Albany State*	Doak Campbell Stadium; Tallahassee, FL	W 31–2	6,758	
September 27	Grambling State*	Doak Campbell Stadium; Tallahassee, FL	L 10–27	23,202	
October 4	vs. Howard	Gator Bowl Stadium; Jacksonville, FL	W 42–25	24,873	
October 11	at Jackson State*	Mississippi Veterans Memorial Stadium; Jackson, MS	L 0–10		
October 25	at No. 2 South Carolina State	State College Stadium; Orangeburg, SC	L 19–21	11,023	
November 1	Tuskegee*	Doak Campbell Stadium; Tallahassee, FL	W 49–22	27,085	
November 7	North Carolina A&T	Doak Campbell Stadium; Tallahassee, FL	L 22–24	5,883	
November 15	at Southern*	University Stadium; Baton Rouge, LA	W 13–7		
November 22	Delaware State	Doak Campbell Stadium; Tallahassee, FL	W 59–7		
November 29	vs. Bethune–Cookman	Tampa Stadium; Tampa, FL (rivalry)	L 14–16		
*Non-conference game; Rankings from AP Poll released prior to the game
