= 1980 Mississippi Valley State Delta Devils football team =

American college football season

1980 Mississippi Valley State Delta Devils football
- Conference: Southwestern Athletic Conference
- Record: 5–5 (3–3 SWAC)
- Head coach: Archie Cooley (1st season)
- Home stadium: Bulldog Stadium; Hornet Stadium

1980 Southwestern Athletic Conference football standings
	Conf.					Overall
Team	W		L		T	W		L		T
No. 2 Grambling State +^	5	–	1	–	0	10	–	2	–	0
Jackson State +	5	–	1	–	0	8	–	3	–	0
Alcorn State	3	–	3	–	0	6	–	4	–	0
Mississippi Valley State	3	–	3	–	0	5	–	5	–	0
Southern	3	–	3	–	0	4	–	6	–	1
Texas Southern	2	–	4	–	0	2	–	9	–	0
Prairie View A&M	0	–	6	–	0	2	–	8	–	0
$ – Conference champion; ^ – NCAA Division I-AA playoff participant; Rankings from Associated Press poll

The 1980 Mississippi Valley State Delta Devils football team represented Mississippi Valley State University as a member of the Southwestern Athletic Conference (SWAC) during the 1980 NCAA Division I-AA football season. Led by first-year head coach Archie Cooley, the Delta Devils compiled an overall record of 5–5, with a conference record of 3–3, and finished tied for third in the SWAC.

== Schedule ==
Date	Opponent	Site	Result	Source
September 6	at Morris Brown*	Herndon Stadium; Atlanta, GA	W 10–6	
September 20	at Arkansas–Pine Bluff*	Pumphrey Stadium; Pine Bluff, AR	W 27–21	
September 27	at Jackson State	Mississippi Veterans Memorial Stadium; Jackson, MS	L 0–40	
October 4	at Southern	University Stadium; Baton Rouge, LA	L 12–14	
October 11	North Carolina A&T*^{†}	Bulldog Stadium; Greenwood, MS	L 16–17	
October 18	Grambling State	Bulldog Stadium; Greenwood, MS	L 24–34	
October 25	at Texas Southern	Robertson Stadium; Houston, TX	W 20–12	
November 1	Prairie View A&M	Bulldog Stadium; Greenwood, MS	W 47–7	
November 8	Alcorn State	Hornet Stadium; Greenville, MS	W 29–17	
November 15	Alabama State*	Bulldog Stadium; Greenwood, MS	L 17–27	
*Non-conference game; ^{†}Homecoming
