= 1980 Alcorn State Braves football team =

American college football season

1980 Alcorn State Braves football
- Conference: Southwestern Athletic Conference
- Record: 6–4 (3–3 SWAC)
- Head coach: Marino Casem (17th season)
- Defensive coordinator: Dennis Thomas (2nd season)
- Home stadium: Henderson Stadium

1980 Southwestern Athletic Conference football standings
	Conf.					Overall
Team	W		L		T	W		L		T
No. 2 Grambling State +^	5	–	1	–	0	10	–	2	–	0
Jackson State +	5	–	1	–	0	8	–	3	–	0
Alcorn State	3	–	3	–	0	6	–	4	–	0
Mississippi Valley State	3	–	3	–	0	5	–	5	–	0
Southern	3	–	3	–	0	4	–	6	–	1
Texas Southern	2	–	4	–	0	2	–	9	–	0
Prairie View A&M	0	–	6	–	0	2	–	8	–	0
$ – Conference champion; ^ – NCAA Division I-AA playoff participant; Rankings from Associated Press poll

The 1980 Alcorn State Braves football team represented Alcorn State University as a member of the Southwestern Athletic Conference (SWAC) during the 1980 NCAA Division I-AA football season. Led by 17th-year head coach Marino Casem, the Braves compiled an overall record of 6–4, with a conference record of 3–3, and finished tied for third in the SWAC.

== Schedule ==
Date	Opponent	Site	Result	Attendance	Source
September 13	vs. Alabama State*	Ladd Stadium; Mobile, AL (Gulf Coast Classic)	W 14–3		
September 20	vs. Grambling State	State Fair Stadium; Shreveport, LA	W 29–27	35,000	
October 4	at No. 3 South Carolina State*	State College Stadium; Orangeburg, SC	L 0–33		
October 11	Texas Southern	Henderson Stadium; Lorman, MS	W 24–3		
October 18	at Albany State*	Mills Stadium; Albany, GA	W 38–17		
October 25	Southern	Henderson Stadium; Lorman, MS	L 7–15		
November 1	Bishop*^{†}	Henderson Stadium; Lorman, MS	W 26–7		
November 8	at Mississippi Valley State	Hornet Stadium; Greenville, MS	L 17–29		
November 15	at Prairie View A&M	Edward L. Blackshear Field; Prairie View, TX	W 38–11		
November 22	Jackson State	Henderson Stadium; Lorman, MS (rivalry)	L 16–37		
*Non-conference game; ^{†}Homecoming; Rankings from AP Poll released prior to the game
