= 1980 Jackson State Tigers football team =

American college football season

1980 Jackson State Tigers football

SWAC co-champion
- Conference: Southwestern Athletic Conference
- Record: 8–3 (5–1 SWAC)
- Head coach: W. C. Gorden (5th season)
- Home stadium: Mississippi Veterans Memorial Stadium

1980 Southwestern Athletic Conference football standings
	Conf.					Overall
Team	W		L		T	W		L		T
No. 2 Grambling State +^	5	–	1	–	0	10	–	2	–	0
Jackson State +	5	–	1	–	0	8	–	3	–	0
Alcorn State	3	–	3	–	0	6	–	4	–	0
Mississippi Valley State	3	–	3	–	0	5	–	5	–	0
Southern	3	–	3	–	0	4	–	6	–	1
Texas Southern	2	–	4	–	0	2	–	9	–	0
Prairie View A&M	0	–	6	–	0	2	–	8	–	0
$ – Conference champion; ^ – NCAA Division I-AA playoff participant; Rankings from Associated Press poll

The 1980 Jackson State Tigers football team represented Jackson State University as a member of the Southwestern Athletic Conference (SWAC) during the 1980 NCAA Division I-AA football season. Led by fifth-year head coach W. C. Gorden, the Tigers compiled and overall record of 8–3 with a mark of 5–1 in conference play, sharing the SWAC title with Grambling State.

== Schedule ==
Date	Opponent	Site	Result	Attendance	Source
September 6	at Alabama State*	Cramton Bowl; Montgomery, AL	W 16–13		
September 13	at Tennessee State*	Dudley Field; Nashville, TN	L 0–20		
September 20	Prairie View A&M	Mississippi Veterans Memorial Stadium; Jackson, MS	W 57–6		
September 27	Mississippi Valley State	Mississippi Veterans Memorial Stadium; Jackson, MS	W 40–0		
October 4	Southeastern Louisiana*	Mississippi Veterans Memorial Stadium; Jackson, MS	L 16–17		
October 11	Florida A&M*	Mississippi Veterans Memorial Stadium; Jackson, MS	W 10–0		
October 18	at Southern	University Stadium; Baton Rouge, LA (rivalry)	W 7–6		
October 25	at No. T–10 Grambling State	Grambling Stadium; Grambling, LA	L 14–24		
November 1	Texas Southern	Mississippi Veterans Memorial Stadium; Jackson, MS	W 50–7	12,000	
November 15	North Carolina Central*	Mississippi Veterans Memorial Stadium; Jackson, MS	W 29–10	11,400	
November 22	at Alcorn State	Henderson Stadium; Lorman, MS (rivalry)	W 37–16		
*Non-conference game; Rankings from Associated Press Poll released prior to the game
