= 1981 Florida A&M Rattlers football team =

American college football season

1981 Florida A&M Rattlers football
- Conference: Mid-Eastern Athletic Conference
- Record: 7–4 (4–1 MEAC)
- Head coach: Rudy Hubbard (8th season)
- Home stadium: Bragg Memorial Stadium

1981 Mid-Eastern Athletic Conference football standings
	Conf.					Overall
Team	W		L		T	W		L		T
No. 3 South Carolina State $^	5	–	0	–	0	10	–	3	–	0
Florida A&M	4	–	1	–	0	7	–	4	–	0
Bethune–Cookman	3	–	2	–	0	6	–	4	–	0
Howard	2	–	3	–	0	6	–	5	–	0
Delaware State	1	–	4	–	0	2	–	9	–	0
North Carolina A&T	0	–	5	–	0	3	–	8	–	0
$ – Conference champion; ^ – NCAA Division I-AA playoff participant; Rankings from NCAA Division I-AA Football Committee poll

The 1981 Florida A&M Rattlers football team represented Florida A&M University as a member of the Mid-Eastern Athletic Conference (MEAC) during the 1981 NCAA Division I-AA football season. Led by eighth-year head coach Rudy Hubbard, the Rattlers compiled an overall record of 7–4, with a mark of 4–1 in conference play, and finished second in the MEAC.

== Schedule ==
Date	Opponent	Site	Result	Attendance	Source
September 5	vs. Grambling State*	Yankee Stadium; Bronx, NY	L 10–21	40,661	
September 12	vs. Murray State*	Gator Bowl Stadium; Jacksonville, FL	L 11–14	32,600	
September 19	Delaware State	Bragg Memorial Stadium; Tallahassee, FL	W 27–3	13,081	
October 3	at Howard	Howard Stadium; Washington, DC	W 31–7	4,500	
October 10	No. 3 Jackson State*	Bragg Memorial Stadium; Tallahassee, FL	L 6–14		
October 24	vs. No. 8 South Carolina State	Miami Orange Bowl; Miami, FL (Orange Blossom Classic)	L 15–16	21,614	
October 31	at Tuskegee*	Alumni Bowl; Tuskegee, AL	W 49–20		
November 7	at North Carolina A&T	Aggie Stadium; Greensboro, NC	W 19–2	1,500	
November 14	Southern*	Bragg Memorial Stadium; Tallahassee, FL	W 41–14	18,100	
November 21	Rhode Island*	Bragg Memorial Stadium; Tallahassee, FL	W 41–6	3,825	
November 28	vs. Bethune–Cookman	Tampa Stadium; Tampa, FL (rivalry)	W 29–0	45,964	
*Non-conference game; Rankings from NCAA Division I-AA Football Committee Poll released prior to the game
