= Joe Purzycki =

American football player and coach (born 1947)

Biographical details
- Born: February 20, 1947 (age 79)

Playing career
- 1967–1970: Delaware

Coaching career (HC unless noted)
- 1971: Kearny HS (NJ) (assistant)
- 1972–1974: Woodbridge HS (DE)
- 1975–1977: Caesar Rodney HS (DE)
- 1978–1980: Delaware (DB)
- 1981–1984: Delaware State
- 1985–1990: James Madison

Head coaching record
- Overall: 55–51–3 (college)
- Tournaments: 0–1 (NCAA D-I-AA playoffs)

Accomplishments and honors

Awards
- MEAC Coach of the Year (1983)

Joseph Purzycki (born February 20, 1947) is an American former football coach. He served as the head football coach at Delaware State University in Dover, Delaware from 1981 to 1984 and James Madison University in Harrisonburg, Virginia from 1985 to 1990, compiling a career college football coaching record of 55–51–3. Purzycki played college football at the University of Delaware and was later an assistant coach at his alma mater, where he learned the Wing T offense from head coach Tubby Raymond. When Purzycki was hired as the head football coach at Delaware State in January 1981, he became the first white man appointed to that role for the historically black school. Many students and players had expected Delaware State to hire Billy Joe, an African American who had played professionally in the American Football League (AFL) and was then an assistant coach for the Philadelphia Eagles of the National Football League (NFL). Some students and players protested Purzycki's hiring.

Purzycki was inducted into the Delaware Sports Hall of Fame in 2005.

== Head coaching record ==
=== College ===
Year	Team	Overall	Conference	Standing	Bowl/playoffs	NCAA^{#}
Delaware State Hornets (Mid-Eastern Athletic Conference) (1981–1984)
1981	Delaware State	2–9	1–4	5th		
1982	Delaware State	4–7	2–3	T–4th		
1983	Delaware State	7–3–1	3–1	2nd		
1984	Delaware State	8–2	3–1	2nd		
Delaware State:		21–21–1	9–9			
James Madison Dukes (NCAA Division I-AA independent) (1985–1990)
1985	James Madison	5–6				
1986	James Madison	5–5–1				
1987	James Madison	9–3			L NCAA Division I-AA First Round	8
1988	James Madison	5–6				
1989	James Madison	5–4–1				
1990	James Madison	5–6				
James Madison:		34–30–2				
Total:		55–51–3				
