= 1980 North Carolina A&T Aggies football team =

American college football season

1980 North Carolina A&T Aggies football

Gold Bowl, W 37–0 vs. North Carolina Central
- Conference: Mid-Eastern Athletic Conference
- Record: 9–3 (3–2 MEAC)
- Head coach: James McKinley (4th season)
- Home stadium: World War Memorial Stadium

1980 Mid-Eastern Athletic Conference football standings
	Conf.					Overall
Team	W		L		T	W		L		T
No. T–3 South Carolina State $	5	–	0	–	0	10	–	1	–	0
North Carolina A&T	3	–	2	–	0	9	–	3	–	0
Howard	2	–	2	–	1	6	–	2	–	2
Bethune–Cookman	2	–	2	–	1	5	–	4	–	1
Florida A&M	2	–	3	–	0	5	–	6	–	0
Delaware State	0	–	5	–	0	2	–	9	–	0
$ – Conference champion; Rankings from Associated Press poll

The 1980 North Carolina A&T Aggies football team represented North Carolina A&T State University as member of the Mid-Eastern Athletic Conference (MEAC) during the 1980 NCAA Division I-AA football season. Led by fourth-year head coach James McKinley, the Aggies compiled an overall record of 9–3, with a mark of 3–2 in conference play, and finished second in the MEAC.

== Schedule ==
Date	Opponent	Site	Result	Attendance	Source
September 13	at Winston-Salem State*	Groves Stadium; Winston-Salem, NC (rivalry)	W 26–21		
September 20	vs. South Carolina State	Giants Stadium; East Rutherford, NJ (rivalry)	L 9–24	10,049	
September 27	Bethune–Cookman	World War Memorial Stadium; Greensboro, NC	W 29–22		
October 4	at Johnson C. Smith*	American Legion Memorial Stadium; Charlotte, NC	W 45–13	7,028	
October 11	at Mississippi Valley State*	Bulldog Stadium; Greenwood, MS	W 17–16		
October 18	Delaware State	World War Memorial Stadium; Greensboro, NC	W 52–0	20,030	
October 25	at Howard	Howard Stadium; Washington, DC	L 14–35		
November 1	Morgan State*	World War Memorial Stadium; Greensboro, NC	W 22–21		
November 7	at Florida A&M	Doak Campbell Stadium; Tallahassee, FL	W 24–22	5,883	
November 15	at Tennessee State*	Hale Stadium; Nashville, TN	L 16–25	10,000	
November 22	at North Carolina Central*	O'Kelly Stadium; Durham, NC (rivalry)	W 49–13	15,158	
December 6	vs. North Carolina Central*	City Stadium; Richmond, VA (Gold Bowl)	W 37–0	3,374	
*Non-conference game
