= 1980 Bethune–Cookman Wildcats football team =

American college football season

1980 Bethune–Cookman Wildcats football
- Conference: Mid-Eastern Athletic Conference
- Record: 6–3–1 (2–2–1 MEAC)
- Head coach: Bobby Frazier (2nd season)
- Home stadium: Memorial Stadium

1980 Mid-Eastern Athletic Conference football standings
	Conf.					Overall
Team	W		L		T	W		L		T
No. T–3 South Carolina State $	5	–	0	–	0	10	–	1	–	0
North Carolina A&T	3	–	2	–	0	9	–	3	–	0
Howard	2	–	2	–	1	6	–	2	–	2
Bethune–Cookman	2	–	2	–	1	5	–	4	–	1
Florida A&M	2	–	3	–	0	5	–	6	–	0
Delaware State	0	–	5	–	0	2	–	9	–	0
$ – Conference champion; Rankings from Associated Press poll

The 1980 Bethune–Cookman Wildcats football team represented Bethune–Cookman College (now known as Bethune–Cookman University) as a member of the Mid-Eastern Athletic Conference (MEAC) during the 1980 NCAA Division I-AA football season. Led by second-year head coach Bobby Frazier, the Wildcats compiled an overall record of 6–3–1, with a mark of 2–2–1 in conference play, and finished tied for third in the MEAC.

== Schedule ==
Date	Opponent	Site	Result	Attendance	Source
September 13	vs. Texas Southern*	Gator Bowl Stadium; Jacksonville, FL	W 10–0	10,000	
September 20	at Howard	Howard Stadium; Washington, DC	T 13–13	7,000	
September 27	at North Carolina A&T	World War Memorial Stadium; Greensboro, NC	L 22–29		
October 4	Delaware State	Memorial Stadium; Daytona Beach, FL	W 37–20	5,109	
October 11	Albany State*	Memorial Stadium; Daytona Beach, FL	W 25–8		
October 25	at Tuskegee*	Alumni Bowl; Tuskegee, AL	W 22–13		
November 1	at Norfolk State*	Foreman Field; Norfolk, VA	L 7–20	13,500	
November 8	No. 1 South Carolina State	Memorial Stadium; Daytona Beach, FL	L 0–21	5,400	
November 15	Morris Brown*	Memorial Stadium; Daytona Beach, FL	W 18–19 (forfeit win)		
November 29	vs. Florida A&M	Tampa Stadium; Tampa, FL (rivalry)	W 16–14		
*Non-conference game; Rankings from AP Poll released prior to the game
