= 1980 Grambling State Tigers football team =

American college football season

1980 Grambling State Tigers football

Black college national champion SWAC champion

NCAA Division I-AA Semifinal, L 9–14 at Boise State
- Conference: Southwestern Athletic Conference
- Record: 10–2 (5–1 SWAC)
- Head coach: Eddie Robinson (38th season)
- Home stadium: Grambling Stadium

1980 Southwestern Athletic Conference football standings
	Conf.					Overall
Team	W		L		T	W		L		T
No. 2 Grambling State +^	5	–	1	–	0	10	–	2	–	0
Jackson State +	5	–	1	–	0	8	–	3	–	0
Alcorn State	3	–	3	–	0	6	–	4	–	0
Mississippi Valley State	3	–	3	–	0	5	–	5	–	0
Southern	3	–	3	–	0	4	–	6	–	1
Texas Southern	2	–	4	–	0	2	–	9	–	0
Prairie View A&M	0	–	6	–	0	2	–	8	–	0
$ – Conference champion; ^ – NCAA Division I-AA playoff participant; Rankings from Associated Press poll

The 1980 Grambling State Tigers football team represented Grambling State University as a member of the Southwestern Athletic Conference (SWAC) during the 1980 NCAA Division I-AA football season. Led by 38th-year head coach Eddie Robinson, the Tigers compiling an overall record of 10–2 and a mark of 5–1 in conference play, and sharing the SWAC title with Jackson State. Grambling State was invited to the NCAA Division I-AA Football Championship playoffs, where they lost to eventual national champion Boise State. The Tigers won a black college football national championship.

== Schedule ==
Date	Opponent	Rank	Site	Result	Attendance	Source
September 13	vs. Morgan State*		Yankee Stadium; Bronx, NY	W 34–13	36,631	
September 20	vs. Alcorn State		State Fair Stadium; Shreveport, LA	L 27–29	35,000	
September 27	at Florida A&M*		Doak Campbell Stadium; Tallahassee, FL	W 27–10	23,202	
October 4	at Prairie View A&M		Edward L. Blackshear Field; Prairie View, TX (rivalry)	W 68–0	6,100	
October 11	Tennessee State*		Grambling Stadium; Grambling, LA	W 52–27	13,571	
October 18	at Mississippi Valley State		Bulldog Stadium; Greenwood, MS	W 34–24		
October 25	Jackson State	No. T–10	Grambling Stadium; Grambling, LA	W 24–14		
November 1	at Texas Southern	No. T–7	Houston Astrodome; Houston, TX	W 43–14		
November 8	at Alabama State	No. T–5	Cramton Bowl; Montgomery, AL	W 28–12	11,000	
November 15	No. 1 South Carolina State*	No. T–5	Grambling Stadium; Grambling, LA	W 26–3		
November 29	vs. Southern	No. 2	Louisiana Superdome; New Orleans, LA (Bayou Classic)	W 43–6	72,000	
December 13	at No. 7 Boise State	No. 2	Bronco Stadium; Boise, ID (NCAA Division I-AA Semifinal)	L 9–14	8,157	
*Non-conference game; Rankings from Associated Press Poll released prior to the game

== Roster ==
1980 Grambling State Tigers football team roster
Players
Coaches
Offense

Pos.	#	Name	Class
WR	2	Trumaine Johnson	So

Defense

Pos.	#	Name	Class
DB	29	Albert Lewis	So
DB	9	Everson Walls	Sr

Special teams

Pos.	#	Name	Class

Head coach

- Eddie Robinson

Coordinators/assistant coaches

Legend

- (C) Team captain
- (S) Suspended
- (I) Ineligible
- Injured
- Redshirt
