= 1981 Bethune–Cookman Wildcats football team =

American college football season

1981 Bethune–Cookman Wildcats football
- Conference: Mid-Eastern Athletic Conference
- Record: 7–4 (3–2 MEAC)
- Head coach: Bobby Frazier (3rd season)
- Home stadium: Memorial Stadium

1981 Mid-Eastern Athletic Conference football standings
	Conf.					Overall
Team	W		L		T	W		L		T
No. 3 South Carolina State $^	5	–	0	–	0	10	–	3	–	0
Florida A&M	4	–	1	–	0	7	–	4	–	0
Bethune–Cookman	3	–	2	–	0	6	–	4	–	0
Howard	2	–	3	–	0	6	–	5	–	0
Delaware State	1	–	4	–	0	2	–	9	–	0
North Carolina A&T	0	–	5	–	0	3	–	8	–	0
$ – Conference champion; ^ – NCAA Division I-AA playoff participant; Rankings from NCAA Division I-AA Football Committee poll

The 1981 Bethune–Cookman Wildcats football team represented Bethune–Cookman College (now known as Bethune–Cookman University) as a member of the Mid-Eastern Athletic Conference (MEAC) during the 1981 NCAA Division I-AA football season. Led by third-year head coach Bobby Frazier, the Wildcats compiled an overall record of 7–4, with a mark of 3–2 in conference play, and finished third in the MEAC.

== Schedule ==
Date	Opponent	Site	Result	Attendance	Source
September 5	at Southern*	BREC Memorial Stadium; Baton Rouge, LA	L 0–3	25,000	
September 12	at Texas Southern*	Robertson Stadium; Houston, TX	L 6–14		
September 19	Howard	Memorial Stadium; Daytona Beach, FL	W 19–13		
September 26	vs. North Carolina A&T	Gator Bowl Stadium; Jacksonville, FL	W 21–15	8,455	
October 3	at Delaware State	Alumni Stadium; Dover, DE	W 8–0		
October 10	vs. Albany State*	Orlando Stadium; Orlando, FL	W 33–8	6,234	
October 17	at Morris Brown*	Herndon Stadium; Atlanta, GA	W 21–14		
October 24	Tuskegee*	Memorial Stadium; Daytona Beach, FL	W 29–13		
November 7	at No. 4 South Carolina State	State College Stadium; Orangeburg, SC	L 6–10		
November 21	at UCF*	Orlando Stadium; Orlando, FL	W 24–20	8,354	
November 28	vs. Florida A&M	Tampa Stadium; Tampa, FL (rivalry)	L 0–29	45,964	
*Non-conference game; Rankings from NCAA Division I-AA Football Committee Poll released prior to the game
