= 1981 North Carolina A&T Aggies football team =

American college football season

1981 North Carolina A&T Aggies football
- Conference: Mid-Eastern Athletic Conference
- Record: 3–8 (0–5 MEAC)
- Head coach: James McKinley (5th season)
- Home stadium: Aggie Stadium

1981 Mid-Eastern Athletic Conference football standings
	Conf.					Overall
Team	W		L		T	W		L		T
No. 3 South Carolina State $^	5	–	0	–	0	10	–	3	–	0
Florida A&M	4	–	1	–	0	7	–	4	–	0
Bethune–Cookman	3	–	2	–	0	6	–	4	–	0
Howard	2	–	3	–	0	6	–	5	–	0
Delaware State	1	–	4	–	0	2	–	9	–	0
North Carolina A&T	0	–	5	–	0	3	–	8	–	0
$ – Conference champion; ^ – NCAA Division I-AA playoff participant; Rankings from NCAA Division I-AA Football Committee poll

The 1981 North Carolina A&T Aggies football team represented North Carolina A&T State University as member of the Mid-Eastern Athletic Conference (MEAC) during the 1981 NCAA Division I-AA football season. Led by fifth-year head coach James McKinley, the Aggies compiled an overall record of 3–8, with a mark of 0–5 in conference play, and finished last in the MEAC.

== Schedule ==
Date	Opponent	Site	Result	Attendance	Source
September 12	Winston-Salem State*	Aggie Stadium; Greensboro, NC (rivalry)	W 21–14		
September 19	at South Carolina State	State College Stadium; Orangeburg, SC	L 6–31	12,038	
September 26	vs. Bethune–Cookman	Gator Bowl Stadium; Jacksonville, FL	L 15–21	8,455	
October 3	Johnson C. Smith*	Aggie Stadium; Greensboro, NC	W 19–18	12,500	
October 10	Mississippi Valley State*	Aggie Stadium; Greensboro, NC	L 7–17		
October 17	at Delaware State	Alumni Stadium; Dover, DE	L 17–21		
October 24	Howard	Aggie Stadium; Greensboro, NC	L 17–21	5,100	
October 31	at Morgan State*	Hughes Stadium; Baltimore, MD	W 25–23	17,402	
November 7	Florida A&M	Aggie Stadium; Greensboro, NC	L 2–19	1,500	
November 21	No. 7 Tennessee State*	Aggie Stadium; Greensboro, NC	L 18–27		
November 28	North Carolina Central*	Aggie Stadium; Greensboro, NC (rivalry)	L 7–35	14,561	
*Non-conference game; Rankings from NCAA Division I-AA Football Committee Poll released prior to the game
