= 1980 South Carolina State Bulldogs football team =

American college football season

1980 South Carolina State Bulldogs football

MEAC champion
- Conference: Mid-Eastern Athletic Conference

Ranking
- AP: No. T–3
- Record: 10–1 (5–0 MEAC)
- Head coach: Bill Davis (2nd season)
- Home stadium: State College Stadium

1980 Mid-Eastern Athletic Conference football standings
	Conf.					Overall
Team	W		L		T	W		L		T
No. T–3 South Carolina State $	5	–	0	–	0	10	–	1	–	0
North Carolina A&T	3	–	2	–	0	9	–	3	–	0
Howard	2	–	2	–	1	6	–	2	–	2
Bethune–Cookman	2	–	2	–	1	5	–	4	–	1
Florida A&M	2	–	3	–	0	5	–	6	–	0
Delaware State	0	–	5	–	0	2	–	9	–	0
$ – Conference champion; Rankings from Associated Press poll

The 1980 South Carolina State Bulldogs football team represented South Carolina State College (now known as South Carolina State University) as a member of the Mid-Eastern Athletic Conference (MEAC) during the 1980 NCAA Division I-AA football season. Led by second-year head coach Bill Davis, the Bulldogs compiled an overall record of 10–1, with a mark of 5–0 in conference play, and finished as MEAC champion.

== Schedule ==
Date	Opponent	Rank	Site	Result	Attendance	Source
September 6	Virginia State*		State College Stadium; Orangeburg, SC	W 35–7	11,348	
September 13	at Delaware State		Alumni Stadium; Dover, DE	W 21–20		
September 20	vs. North Carolina A&T		Giants Stadium; East Rutherford, NJ (rivalry)	W 24–9	10,049	
September 27	Howard	No. T–3	State College Stadium; Orangeburg, SC	W 30–17	9,000	
October 4	Alcorn State*	No. 3	State College Stadium; Orangeburg, SC	W 33–0		
October 11	Johnson C. Smith*	No. T–1	State College Stadium; Orangeburg, SC	W 34–8	15,002	
October 18	vs. Morgan State*	No. T–1	Giants Stadium; East Rutherford, NJ	W 49–13	14,472	
October 25	Florida A&M	No. 2	State College Stadium; Orangeburg, SC	W 21–19	11,023	
November 1	at Morris Brown*	No. T–1	Herndon Stadium; Atlanta, GA	W 59–7	14,500	
November 8	at Bethune–Cookman	No. 1	Memorial Stadium; Daytona Beach, FL	W 21–0	5,400	
November 15	at No. T–5 Grambling State*	No. 1	Grambling Stadium; Grambling, LA	L 3–26		
*Non-conference game; Rankings from AP Poll released prior to the game
