= Cornelius Cooper =

American football player and coach (born 1947)

Biographical details
- Born: January 10, 1947 (age 79)

Playing career
- 1964–1967: Prairie View A&M
- Position: Tackle

Coaching career (HC unless noted)
- 1980–1981: Prairie View A&M

Head coaching record
- Overall: 4–16

Cornelius Cooper (born January 10, 1947) is an American former football player and coach. He was the 13th head football coach at Prairie View A&M University in Prairie View, Texas and he held that position for two seasons, from 1980 until 1981. His record at Prairie View was 4–16.

Cooper played offensive tackle at Prairie View and was selected in the 11th round (280th overall pick) of the in 1968 NFL/AFL draft by the Miami Dolphins.

Cooper later taught in the West Orange-Cove Consolidated Independent School District as a coach then later as a ISS teacher.

== Head coaching record ==
Year	Team	Overall	Conference	Standing	Bowl/playoffs
Prairie View A&M Panthers (Southwestern Athletic Conference) (1980–1981)
1980	Prairie View A&M	2–8	0–6	7th	
1981	Prairie View A&M	2–8	1–5	7th	
Prairie View A&M:		4–16	1–11		
Total:		4–16			
