= Oliver Pough =

American football player and coach

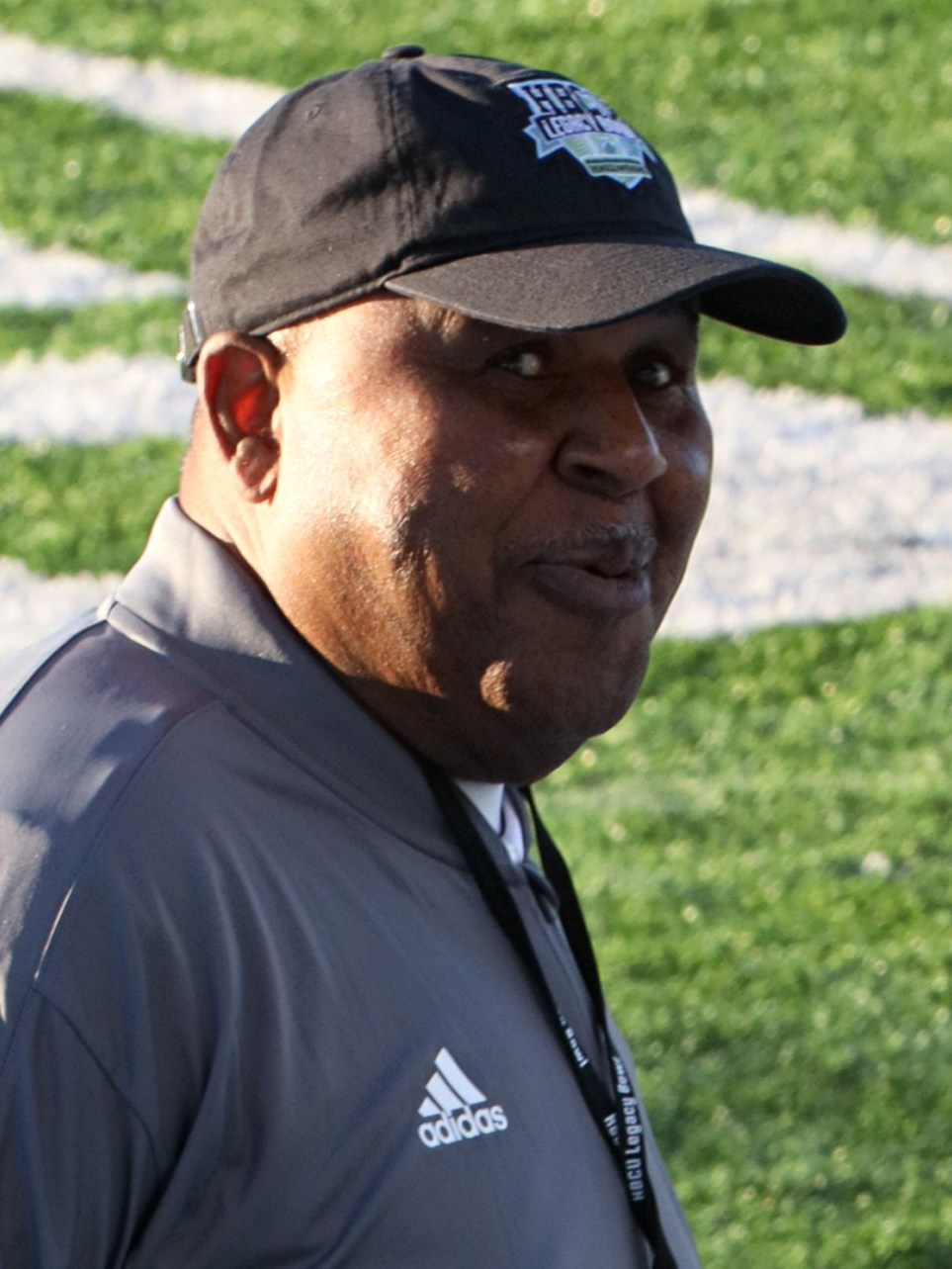
- Pough in 2022

Playing career
- 1971–1974: South Carolina State
- Position: Offensive lineman

Coaching career (HC unless noted)
- 1976–1978: Orangeburg-Wilkinson HS (SC) (assistant)
- 1979–1980: South Carolina State (DL)
- 1981–1985: South Carolina State (DC/DL)
- 1986–1988: Orangeburg-Wilkinson HS (SC) (AHC)
- 1989–1993: Keenan HS (SC)
- 1994–1996: Fairfield Central HS (SC)
- 1997–2001: South Carolina (RB)
- 2002–2023: South Carolina State

Head coaching record
- Overall: 151–93 (college)
- Bowls: 1–0
- Tournaments: 0–4 (NCAA D-I playoffs)

Accomplishments and honors

Championships
- 3 Black college football national (2008, 2009, 2021); 8 MEAC (2004, 2008–2010, 2013, 2014, 2019, 2021)

Awards
- 4× MEAC Coach of the Year (2008, 2009, 2019, 2021)

Oliver Wendell "Buddy" Pough III is an American former college football coach and player. He served as the head football coach at South Carolina State University, a position he held from 2002 until his retirement in 2023. He led the South Carolina State Bulldogs football team to eight Mid-Eastern Athletic Conference (MEAC) titles, in 2004, 2008, 2009, 2010, 2013, 2014, 2019, and 2021.

Pough is a member of the MEAC Hall of Fame and the South Carolina Football Hall of Fame.

== Head coaching record ==
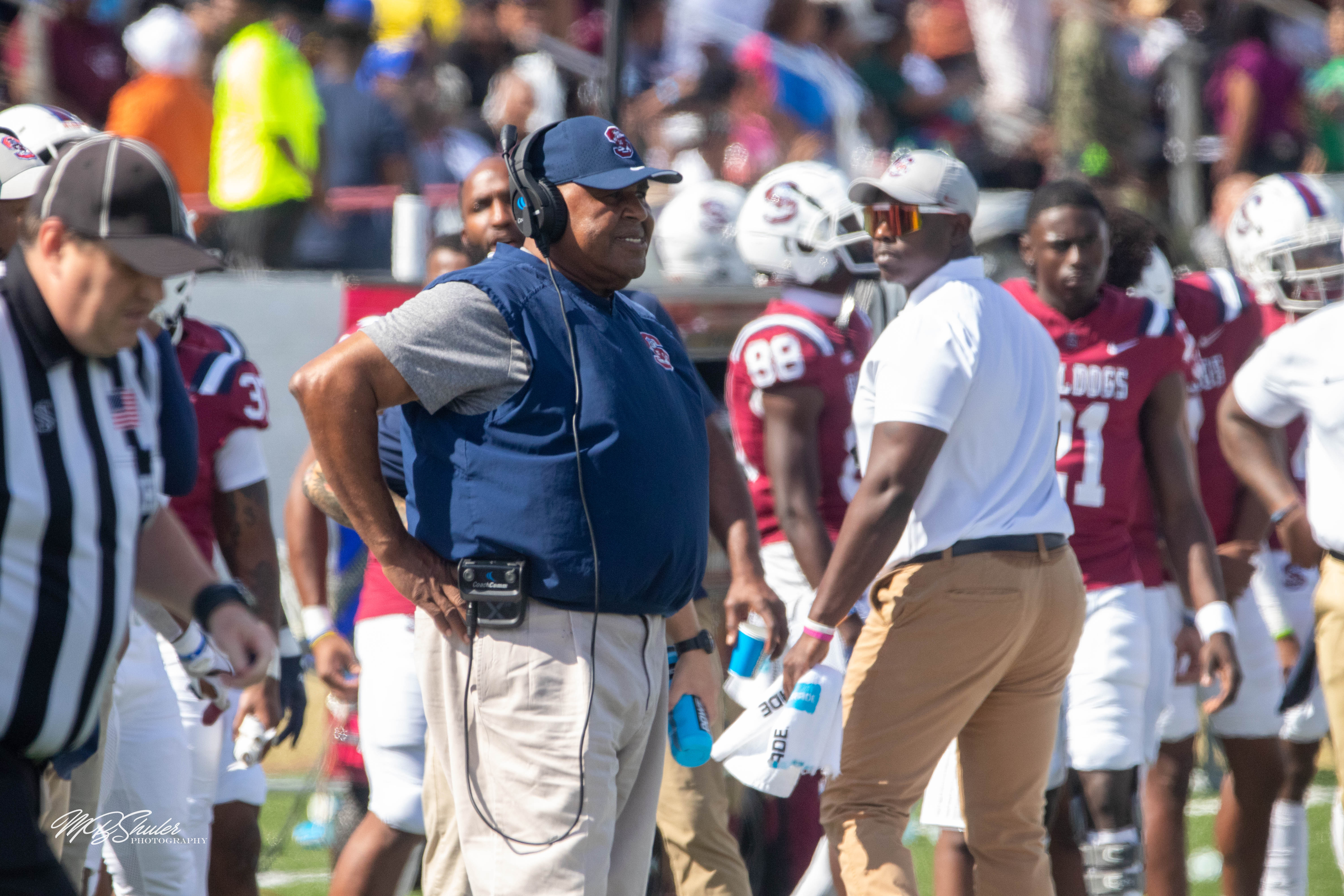
Oliver Buddy Pough in 2023

=== College ===
Year	Team	Overall	Conference	Standing	Bowl/playoffs	TSN^{#}	Coaches^{°}
South Carolina State Bulldogs (Mid-Eastern Athletic Conference) (2002–present)
2002	South Carolina State	7–5	4–4	T–5th			
2003	South Carolina State	8–4	5–2	T–2nd			
2004	South Carolina State	9–2	6–1	T–1st		22	
2005	South Carolina State	9–2	7–1	2nd		20	
2006	South Carolina State	7–4	6–2	T–2nd			
2007	South Carolina State	7–4	7–2	T–2nd			
2008	South Carolina State	10–3	8–0	1st	L NCAA Division I First Round	13	13
2009	South Carolina State	10–2	8–0	1st	L NCAA Division I First Round	8	8
2010	South Carolina State	9–3	7–1	T–1st	L NCAA Division I First Round	16	17
2011	South Carolina State	7–4	6–2	T–2nd			
2012	South Carolina State	5–6	4–4	T–6th			
2013	South Carolina State	9–4	7–1	T–1st	L NCAA Division I First Round	25	
2014	South Carolina State	8–4	6–2	T–1st			
2015	South Carolina State	7–4	6–2	4th			
2016	South Carolina State	5–6	5–3	T–3rd			
2017	South Carolina State	3–7	2–6	T–8th			
2018	South Carolina State	5–6	4–3	T–4th			
2019	South Carolina State	8–3	6–2	T–2nd*			
2020–21	South Carolina State	3–1	2–0	1st (South)			
2021	South Carolina State	7–5	5–0	1st	W Celebration Bowl		
2022	South Carolina State	3–8	1–4	6th			
2023	South Carolina State	5–6	3–2	T–3rd			
South Carolina State:		151–93	115–44	*conf champs in 2019 due to NCAA sanctions on Florida A&M			
Total:		151–93					
National championship Conference title Conference division title or championship game berth
^{†}Indicates Bowl Coalition, Bowl Alliance, BCS, or CFP / New Years' Six bowl.
