= Willie Jeffries =

American football player and coach (born 1937)

Biographical details
- Born: January 4, 1937 (age 89); Union, South Carolina, U.S.

Playing career
- c. 1959: South Carolina State
- Position: Center

Coaching career (HC unless noted)
- 1968–1971: North Carolina A&T (DL)
- 1972: Pittsburgh (assistant)
- 1973–1978: South Carolina State
- 1979–1983: Wichita State
- 1984–1988: Howard
- 1989–2001: South Carolina State

Head coaching record
- Overall: 180–132–6 (college); 64–8–2 (high school)
- Bowls: 3–4

Accomplishments and honors

Championships
- 3 black college national (1976–1977, 1994); 7 MEAC (1974–1978, 1987, 1994)

Awards
- 5× MEAC Coach of the Year (1973, 1976, 1978, 1987, 1992)
- College Football Hall of Fame; Inducted in 2010 (profile)

Willie E. Jeffries (born January 4, 1937) is an American former football player and coach. He served as the head football coach at South Carolina State University for 19 seasons in two stints, five seasons at Wichita State University, and five seasons at Howard University. Jeffries was the first African American head coach of an NCAA Division I-A football program at a predominantly white college when he coached Wichita State. He was elected to the College Football Hall of Fame in 2010.

== Early life ==
Jeffries grew up in South Carolina, where he attended the segregated Sims High School in Union, South Carolina. He played football there for coach James F. Moorer, who went on a record-setting win streak.

== Coaching career ==
Jeffries started his coaching career in 1960 as an assistant at Barr Street High School in Lancaster, South Carolina. He was given his first head coaching job in Gaffney, South Carolina where he went 64–8–2 in seven seasons.

=== South Carolina State ===
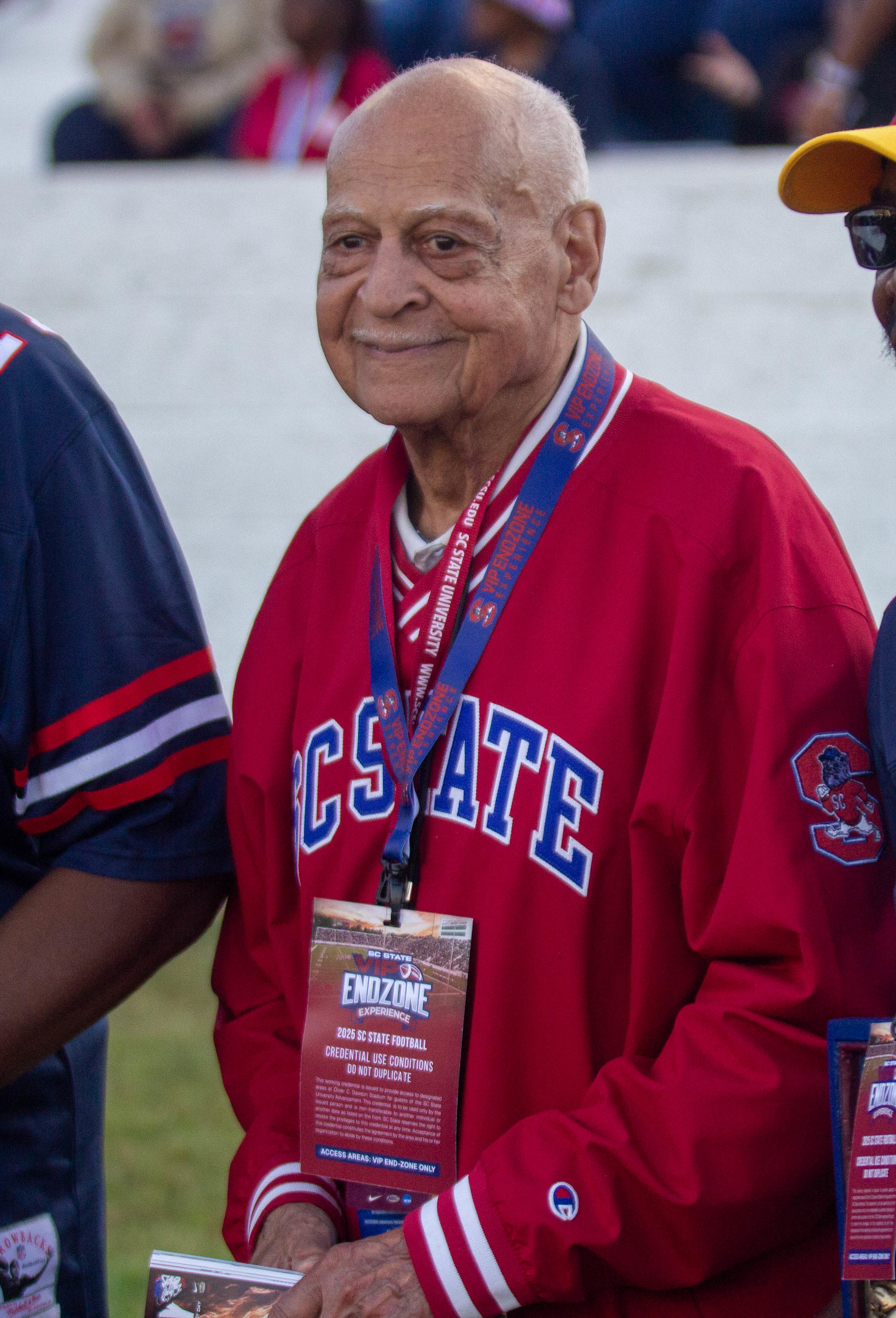
Coach Willie Jeffries in 2025

Jeffries's record during his two stints with the South Carolina State Bulldogs football team (1973 to 1978 and 1989 to 2001) includes three black college football national championships (1976, 1977, and 1994), seven Mid-Eastern Athletic Conference (MEAC) championships, several post-season appearances, and numerous coaching awards. Players that Jeffries coached at South Carolina State include College Football Hall of Famers Harry Carson and Donnie Shell as well as Robert Porcher, Orlando Brown Sr., Chartric Darby, Dextor Clinkscale, and Anthony Cook.

In 2010, Jeffries was named Head Football Coach Emeritus by the South Carolina State University Board of Trustees. With the new role, Jeffries will also serve as a liaison between the university, its alumni and other constituents and also help market the university. University President Dr. George Cooper said of the elevation to Coach Emeritus, ""Coach Jeffries and his wide appeal to so many of our stakeholders and other constituents provide us a great opportunity to brand and market the University. He can help us frame relationships that will increase support for athletics."

SCSU Athletic Director Charlene Johnson added, "Coach Jeffries is truly admired by so many. Not just for his achievements in athletics, but also for his humanitarian contributions to this community, this state and society. He has used football and his great personal skills to bring about better community relations in Orangeburg, the Palmetto State and beyond and I think it's very fitting that the university has bestowed this honor upon him."

=== Wichita State ===
When Jeffries took over Wichita State in 1979, he became the first African American head coach of a Division I-A football program at a predominantly white school. He is the only man to coach against both Eddie Robinson of Grambling State and Bear Bryant of Alabama.

Jeffries was the 32nd head football coach Wichita State for five seasons from 1979 until 1983. His 1982 team's record of 8–3 proved to be the last winning season in Wichita State history as the program was discontinued after the 1986 season. His overall coaching record at Wichita State was 21–32–2. This ranks him third at Wichita State in terms of total wins and 21st at Wichita State in terms of winning percentage. During his time at Wichita State, Jeffries team was censured by the NCAA for repeated rules violations including improper recruitment and unethical conduct by the coaching staff. This led to the team being placed on probation for the 1983 and 1984 seasons which prevented them from appearing on live television, docked them five scholarships per season, and banned them from post-season participation. Due in part to the probation, Wichita State discontinued their football program following the 1986 season.

The players whom Jeffries coached at Wichita State include: Anthony Jones, Jumpy Geathers and Prince McJunkins.

=== Howard ===
Jeffries coached at Howard University from 1984 to 1988. He led the Howard Bison football team to win the Mid-Eastern Athletic Conference (MEAC) in 1987, however, this title was forfeited along with all victories for the season when it was learned that Jeffries had used up to 30 ineligible players on his team. His coaching record at Howard was 21–32. The Bison players who played under Jeffries who went on to be drafted into the NFL were tight end Jimmie Johnson, Harvey Reed, Troy Kyles, Derrick Faison, David Westbrook, Sean Vanhorse, Brian Taltoan, Gary Willingham, John Javis, James Moses and Tim Watson.

== Awards and honors ==
On May 5, 1988, the Governor of South Carolina Carroll Campbell presented Jeffries with the Order of the Palmetto. This is the highest civilian honor in the state of South Carolina and is awarded to those citizens who make achievements of statewide impact.

Jeffries was awarded the companion honor of the Order of the Silver Crescent by Governor Jim Hodges on October 13, 2001. This is awarded to those who make community or professional accomplishments of local significance.

On June 20, 2009, Jeffries was inducted into the Wichita Sports Hall of Fame for his color barrier breaking run as head coach of Wichita State.

Jeffries was inducted into the College Football Hall of Fame in the enshrinement ceremonies in South Bend, Indiana on July 16–17, 2010.

The South Carolina State Board of Trustees voted to name the football field in Oliver C. Dawson Stadium after Jeffries. Willie E. Jeffries Field was unveiled during halftime of the November 5, 2010 Howard at South Carolina State football game. The halftime festivities included an NFF Hall of Fame On-Campus Salute sponsored by The National Football Foundation & College Hall of Fame. NFF representative Hillary Jeffries (no relation) presented Coach Jeffries with a plaque as part of Willie Jeffries day in Orangeburg.

== Personal life ==
Jeffries has been a friend of Herman Boone dating back to when the two were assistant coaches in North Carolina. Boone wrote a letter of recommendation in support of Jeffries' induction into the College Football Hall of Fame. In it, Boone wrote, "Without his leadership and example, there would not have been Remember the Titans or the advancement in race relations in sports that we have witnessed."

== Head coaching record ==
=== College ===
Year	Team	Overall	Conference	Standing	Bowl/playoffs
South Carolina State Bulldogs (Mid-Eastern Athletic Conference) (1973–1978)
1973	South Carolina State	7–3–1	4–1–1	2nd	
1974	South Carolina State	8–4	5–1	1st	L Pelican
1975	South Carolina State	8–2–1	5–1	T–1st	L Pelican
1976	South Carolina State	10–1	5–1	T–1st	W Bicentennial
1977	South Carolina State	9–1–1	6–0	1st	W Gold
1978	South Carolina State	8–2–1	5–0–1	1st	
Wichita State Shockers (Missouri Valley Conference) (1979–1983)
1979	Wichita State	1–10	1–4	T–4th	
1980	Wichita State	5–5–1	4–1–1	2nd	
1981	Wichita State	4–6–1	3–3–1	T–5th	
1982	Wichita State	8–3	4–1	T–2nd	
1983	Wichita State	3–8	3–3	T–4th	
Wichita State:		21–32–2	15–12–2		
Howard Bison (Mid-Eastern Athletic Conference) (1984–1988)
1984	Howard	2–8	0–4	5th	
1985	Howard	4–7	0–4	5th	
1986	Howard	9–3	3–2	T–2nd	
1987	Howard	9–1 (Note: The Howard Bison went 9–1 in the regular season, but were later found to have used ineligible players and forfeited all games.)	5–0	1st	
1988	Howard	7–4	3–3	T–4th	
Howard:		31–23	11–13		
South Carolina State Bulldogs (Mid-Eastern Athletic Conference) (1989–2001)
1989	South Carolina State	5–6	3–3	T–3rd	
1990	South Carolina State	4–6	2–4	5th	
1991	South Carolina State	7–4	3–3	T–3rd	
1992	South Carolina State	7–4	4–2	T–2nd	
1993	South Carolina State	8–4	4–2	2nd	L Heritage
1994	South Carolina State	10–2	6–0	1st	W Heritage
1995	South Carolina State	6–4	4–2	3rd	
1996	South Carolina State	4–6	4–3	T–3rd	
1997	South Carolina State	9–3	5–2	T–2nd	L Heritage
1998	South Carolina State	5–6	3–5	T–6th	
1999	South Carolina State	4–6	2–5	7th	
2000	South Carolina State	3–8	2–6	T–7th	
2001	South Carolina State	6–5	5–3	T–3rd	
South Carolina State:		128–77–4	77–44–2		
Total:		180–132–6			
National championship Conference title Conference division title or championship game berth
