= 2021 Celebration Bowl =

Postseason college football bowl game

2021 Cricket Celebration Bowl
- 6th Celebration Bowl
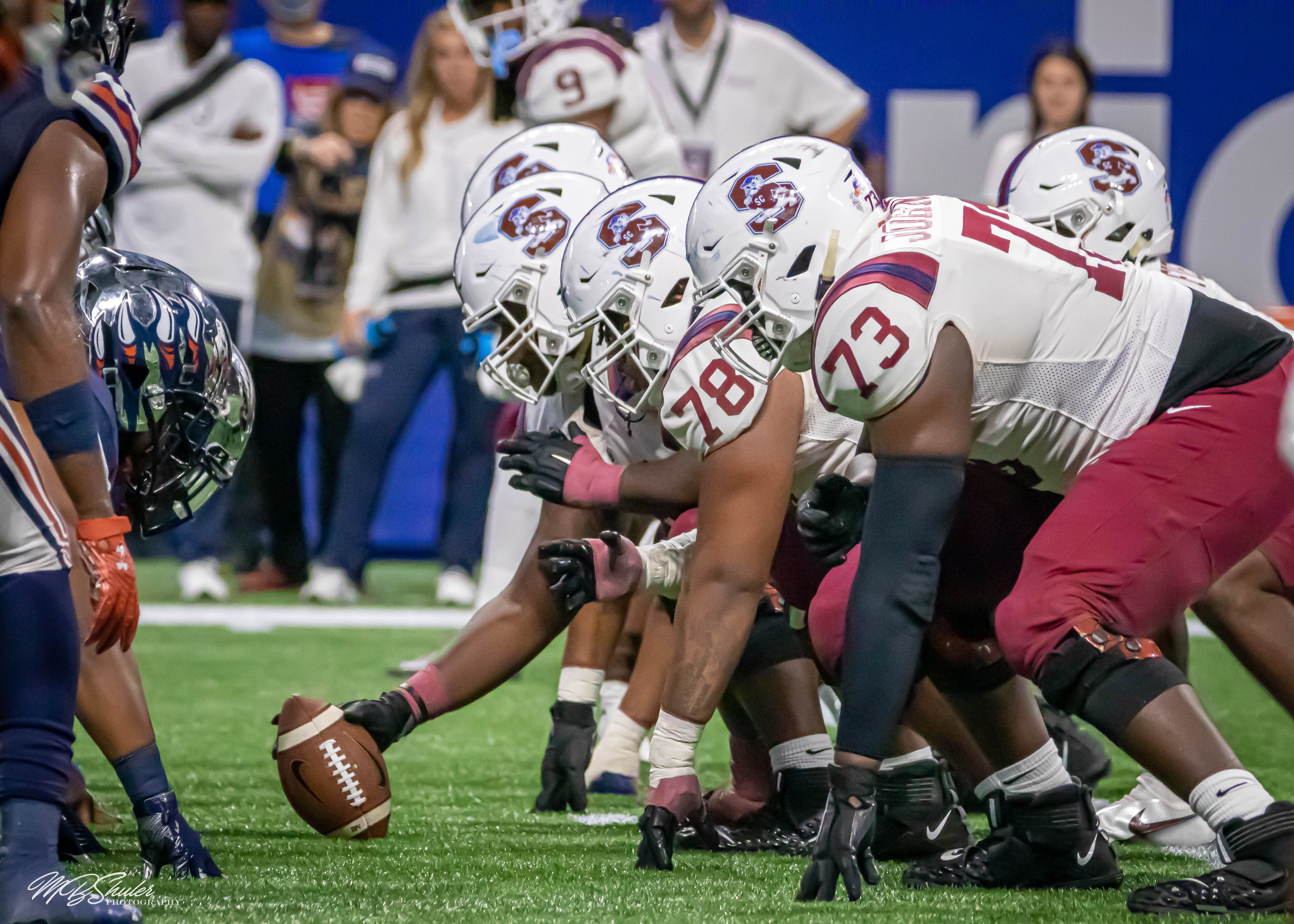
South Carolina State Bulldogs	Jackson State Tigers
(6–5)	(11–1)
MEAC	SWAC
31	10
Head coach: Oliver Pough	Head coach: Deion Sanders
	Coaches / STATS; 14 / 15
	1	2	3	4	Total
South Carolina State	0	10	14	7	31
Jackson State	7	0	3	0	10
- Date: December 18, 2021
- Season: 2021
- Stadium: Mercedes-Benz Stadium
- Location: Atlanta, Georgia
- MVP: Off: Shaquan Davis (WR, SCSU); Def: Decobie Durant (DB, SCSU)
- Favorite: Jackson State by 11.5
- Referee: Tim Rich (AAC)
- Attendance: 48,653

United States TV coverage
- Network: ABC
- Announcers: Mark Jones (play-by-play), Robert Griffin III (analyst), Jay Walker (analyst), Quint Kessenich and Tiffany Greene (sidelines)

The 2021 Celebration Bowl was a college football bowl game played on December 18, 2021, with kickoff at 12:00 p.m. EST at Mercedes-Benz Stadium in Atlanta, with television coverage on ABC. It was one of the highest attended and sixth edition of the Celebration Bowl, and was the only one of the 2021–22 bowl games to feature FCS teams. Sponsored by wireless service provider Cricket Wireless, the game was officially known as the Cricket Celebration Bowl.

Each year, the Celebration Bowl matches the champions of the Mid-Eastern Athletic Conference (MEAC) against the champions of the Southwestern Athletic Conference (SWAC). These are the two prominent NCAA Division I conferences of historically black colleges and universities (HBCUs).

== Teams ==
The game was played between the South Carolina State Bulldogs, champions of the Mid-Eastern Athletic Conference (MEAC), and the Jackson State Tigers, champions of the Southwestern Athletic Conference (SWAC).

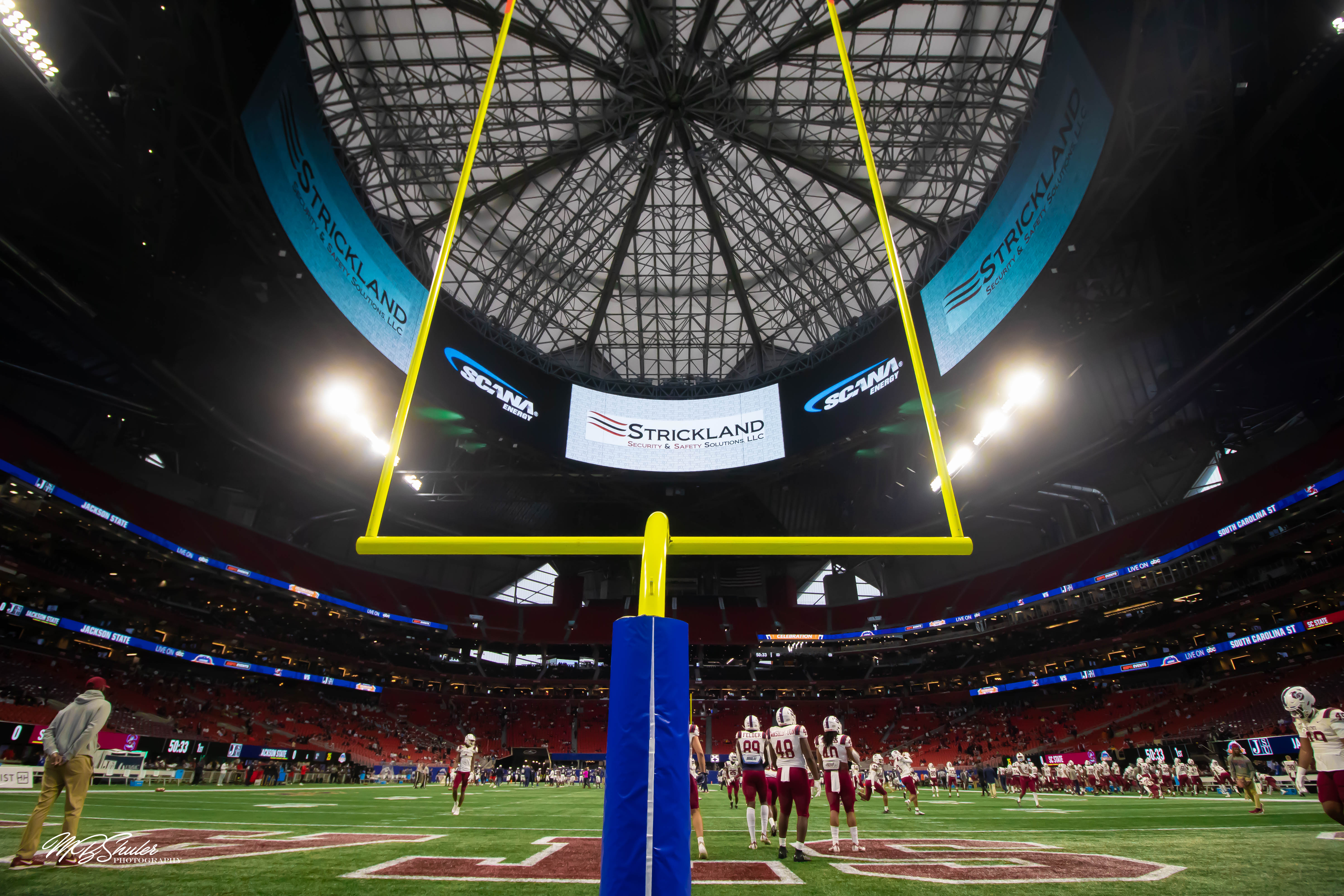
SC State University vs Jackson State 2021

=== South Carolina State Bulldogs ===
The Bulldogs of the MEAC clinched a berth in the Celebration Bowl on November 13; they completed their regular season with a 5–0 record in conference play, 6–5 overall. This was the first Celebration Bowl appearance by the Bulldogs.

=== Jackson State Tigers ===
The SWAC was represented by the winner of the SWAC Championship Game, the Jackson State Tigers, who defeated the Prairie View A&M Panthers by a score of 27–10 on December 4.

== Game summary ==
2021 Cricket Celebration Bowl

Quarter	1	2	3	4	Total
South Carolina State	0	10	14	7	31
Jackson State	7	0	3	0	10

at Mercedes-Benz Stadium • Atlanta, Georgia

- Date: Saturday, December 18, 2021
- Game time: 12:00 p.m. EST
- Game weather: n/a (game played indoors)
- Game attendance: 48,653
- Referee: Tim Rich
- TV announcers (ABC): Mark Jones (play-by-play), Robert Griffin III (analyst), Jay Walker (analyst), Tiffany Greene and Quint Kessenich (sidelines)
- Box score

Scoring summary

Quarter	Time	Drive			Team	Scoring information	Score	
Quarter	Time	Plays	Yards	TOP	Team	Scoring information	SCSU	JSU
1	7:24	9	66	4:58	Jackson State	Keith Corbin 7-yard touchdown reception from Shedeur Sanders, Bailey Raborn kick good	0	7
2	2:06	3	5	1:19	South Carolina State	Shaquan Davis 6-yard touchdown reception from Corey Fields Jr., Gavyn Zimmerman kick good	7	7
2	0:08	10	36	0:57	South Carolina State	26-yard field goal by Gavyn Zimmerman	10	7
3	12:36	2	16	0:54	South Carolina State	Shaquan Davis 16-yard touchdown reception from Corey Fields Jr., Gavyn Zimmerman kick good	17	7
3	8:43	6	19	2:47	South Carolina State	Richard Bailey 15-yard touchdown reception from Corey Fields Jr., Gavyn Zimmerman kick good	24	7
3	0:15	7	43	3:02	Jackson State	36-yard field goal by Bailey Raborn	24	10
4	6:19	9	93	6:18	South Carolina State	Shaquan Davis 16-yard touchdown reception from Corey Fields Jr., Gavyn Zimmerman kick good	31	10
"TOP" = time of possession. For other American football terms, see Glossary of American football.							31	10

=== Statistics ===
Statistics	SCSU	JSU
First downs	15	15
Plays–yards	68–268	65–194
Rushes–yards	37–102	29–19
Passing yards	166	175
Passing: comp–att–int	12–31–1	16–36–2
Time of possession	31:37	28:23

Team	Category	Player	Statistics
South Carolina State	Passing	Corey Fields Jr.	12/31, 166 yards, 4 TD, 1 INT
South Carolina State	Rushing	Donte Anthony	17 carries, 65 yards
South Carolina State	Receiving	Shaquan Davis	5 receptions, 95 yards, 3 TD
Jackson State	Passing	Shedeur Sanders	16/36, 175 yards, 1 TD, 2 INT
Jackson State	Rushing	Santee Marshall	4 carries, 23 yards
Jackson State	Receiving	Malachi Wideman	3 receptions, 42 yards
