= 1982 UCLA Bruins football team =

American college football season

1982 UCLA Bruins football

Pac-10 champion Rose Bowl champion

Rose Bowl, W 24–14 vs. Michigan
- Conference: Pacific-10 Conference

Ranking
- Coaches: No. 5
- AP: No. 5
- Record: 10–1–1 (5–1–1 Pac-10)
- Head coach: Terry Donahue (7th season)
- Offensive coordinator: Homer Smith (5th season)
- Co-defensive coordinators: Bob Field (1st season); Tom Hayes (1st season)
- Home stadium: Rose Bowl

1982 Pacific-10 Conference football standings
	Conf.					Overall
Team	W		L		T	W		L		T
No. 5 UCLA $	5	–	1	–	1	10	–	1	–	1
No. 7 Washington	6	–	2	–	0	10	–	2	–	0
No. 6 Arizona State	5	–	2	–	0	10	–	2	–	0
No. 15 USC	5	–	2	–	0	8	–	3	–	0
Arizona	4	–	3	–	1	6	–	4	–	1
California	4	–	4	–	0	7	–	4	–	0
Stanford	3	–	5	–	0	5	–	6	–	0
Washington State	2	–	4	–	1	3	–	7	–	1
Oregon	2	–	6	–	0	2	–	8	–	1
Oregon State	0	–	7	–	1	1	–	9	–	1
$ – Conference champion; Rankings from AP Poll

The 1982 UCLA Bruins football team was an American football team that represented the University of California, Los Angeles during the 1982 NCAA Division I-A football season. In their seventh year under head coach Terry Donahue, the Bruins compiled a 10–1–1 record (5–1–1 Pac-10), finished in first place in the Pacific-10 Conference.

In the Rose Bowl on New Year's Day, the Bruins defeated Michigan of the Big Ten Conference by ten points and remained at fifth in the final AP Poll.

UCLA's offensive leaders in 1982 were quarterback Tom Ramsey with 2,986 passing yards, running back Danny Andrews with 482 rushing yards, and wide receiver Cormac Carney with 779 receiving yards.

Prior to this season, UCLA moved its home games to the Rose Bowl in Pasadena; they had played in the Los Angeles Memorial Coliseum since 1928, sharing with the USC Trojans.

== Schedule ==
Date	Time	Opponent	Rank	Site	TV	Result	Attendance	Source
September 11	1:30 p.m.	Long Beach State*	No. 18	Rose Bowl; Pasadena, CA		W 41–10	45,396	
September 18		at Wisconsin*	No. 14	Camp Randall Stadium; Madison, WI		W 51–26	77,947	
September 25		at No. 20 Michigan*	No. 12	Michigan Stadium; Ann Arbor, MI	CBS	W 31–27	105,413	
October 2		at Colorado*	No. 9	Folsom Field; Boulder, CO	KTLA	W 34–6	38,702	
October 9		Arizona	No. 8	Rose Bowl; Pasadena, CA		T 24–24	50,133	
October 16		Washington State	No. 12	Rose Bowl; Pasadena, CA		W 42–17	41,732	
October 23	1:06 p.m.	at California	No. 11	California Memorial Stadium; Berkeley, CA (rivalry)		W 47–31	51,600	
October 30		Oregon	No. 11	Rose Bowl; Pasadena, CA		W 40–12	40,808	
November 6		at No. 10 Washington	No. 9	Husky Stadium; Seattle, WA	CBS	L 7–10	58,558	
November 13		Stanford^{†}	No. 12	Rose Bowl; Pasadena, CA (rivalry)		W 38–35	78,452	
November 20		No. 15 USC	No. 11	Rose Bowl; Pasadena, CA (Victory Bell)	ABC	W 20–19	95,736	
January 1, 1983		vs. No. 19 Michigan*	No. 5	Rose Bowl; Pasadena, CA (Rose Bowl)	NBC	W 24–14	104,991	
*Non-conference game; ^{†}Homecoming; Rankings from AP Poll released prior to the game; All times are in Pacific time

== Game summaries ==
=== Long Beach State ===
- JoJo Townsell 5 Rec, 133 Yds

=== At Wisconsin ===
Team	1	2	3	4	Total
• No. 14 UCLA	10	20	7	14	51
Wisconsin	0	6	13	7	26

- Date: September 18
- Location: Camp Randall Stadium, Madison, WI
- Game attendance: 77,947

Scoring summary
Q1	UCLA	Ramsey 1 yard run (Potter kick)	UCLA 7–0
Q1	UCLA	Potter 27 yard field goal	UCLA 10–0
Q2	UCLA	Bergmann 3 yard pass from Ramsey (Potter kick)	UCLA 17–0
Q2	UCLA	Nelson 5 yard run (Potter kick)	UCLA 24–0
Q2	WIS	Wright 1 yard run (run failed)	UCLA 24–6
Q2	UCLA	Ramsey 1 yard run (kick failed)	UCLA 30–6
Q3	UCLA	Cephaus 12 yard run (Potter kick)	UCLA 37–6
Q3	WIS	Stracko 19 yard pass from Wright (Doran kick)	UCLA 37–13
Q3	WIS	Williams 1 yard run (run failed)	UCLA 37–19
Q4	UCLA	Howell 1 yard pass from Ramsey (Potter kick)	UCLA 44–19
Q4	UCLA	Sherrod 20 yard pass from Neuheisel (Potter kick)	UCLA 51–19
Q4	WIS	Stracko 16 yard pass from Wright (Doran kick)	UCLA 51–26

Tom Ramsey completed 17 of 24 passes for 260 yards and rushed 17 times for 56 yards in the game.

=== At Michigan ===
Team	1	2	3	4	Total
• No. 12 UCLA	0	14	14	3	31
No. 20 Michigan	7	17	3	0	27

- Date: September 2
- Location: Michigan Stadium, Ann Arbor, Michigan
- Game attendance: 105,413

Down 21–0 in the second quarter, Tom Ramsey mounted a 28-point comeback in the second and third quarters to defeat the 20th ranked Michigan team before a capacity crowd of 105,413 fans in Michigan Stadium.

=== Colorado ===
- Cormac Carney 6 Rec, 103 Yds

=== Arizona ===
- Tom Ramsey 345 pass yards

=== California ===
- Tom Ramsey 322 pass yards
- Cormac Carney 4 Rec, 132 Yds

=== Stanford ===
- Tom Ramsey 314 pass yards
- Danny Andrews 21 rushes, 148 yards
- Cormac Carney 6 receptions, 137 yards

=== USC ===
#15 USC Trojans at #11 UCLA Bruins

Quarter	1	2	3	4	Total
USC	3	7	0	9	19
UCLA	14	3	3	0	20

at Rose Bowl, Pasadena, California

- Date: November 20, 1982
- Game attendance: 95,736
- Gainesville Sun, 1982 Nov 21.

Game information

First quarter

- UCLA – Howell 9-yard pass from Tom Ramsey (John Lee kick). UCLA 7–0. Drive:
- USC – Steve Jordan 44-yard field goal. UCLA 7–3. Drive:
- UCLA – Danny Andrews 23-yard run (John Lee kick). UCLA 14–3. Drive:

Second quarter

- UCLA – John Lee 45-yard field goal. UCLA 17–3. Drive:
- USC – Todd Spencer 3-yard run (Steve Jordan kick). UCLA 17–10. Drive:

Third quarter

- UCLA – John Lee 42-yard field goal. UCLA 20–10. Drive:

Fourth quarter

- USC – Steve Jordan 21-yard field goal. UCLA 20–13. Drive:
- USC – Mark Boyer 1-yard pass from Scott Tinsley (run failed), 0:00. UCLA 20–19. Drive:

Top passers

- USC – Scott Tinsley – 14/23, 137 yards, TD, INT
- UCLA – Tom Ramsey – 11/24, 135 yards

Top rushers

- USC – Anthony Gibson – 30 rushes, 97 yards
- UCLA – Danny Andrews – 15 rushes, 78 yards, TD

Top receivers

- USC – Jeff Simmons – 4 receptions, 46 yards
- UCLA – Kevin Nelson – 2 receptions, 33 yards

Noseguard Karl Morgan rushed in to tackle down USC quarterback Scott Tinsley, preventing him from scoring a two-pont conversion after Tinsley had thrown a pass to bring the Trojans back within a point. Linebacker Neal Dellocono was the most valuable player of the game.

With the win (and Washington's loss), UCLA clinched a Rose Bowl berth.

=== Vs. Michigan (Rose Bowl) ===
	1	2	3	4	Total
#19 Michigan	0	7	0	7	14
#5 UCLA	7	3	7	7	24

UCLA took a 10–0 lead in the second quarter. A hard hit by UCLA defensive back Don Rogers separated Michigan quarterback Steve Smith's shoulder and knocked him out of the game. Backup David Hall got the Wolverines on the board, making the halftime score 10–7. In the third quarter, Tom Ramsey completed seven straight passes and led UCLA on a drive that was capped by Danny Andrews' nine-yard touchdown run to make the score 17–7. In the fourth quarter, UCLA got an interception inside the Michigan 20-yard line and scored again for a 24–7 lead. Michigan scored late to close the score to 24–14.

== Personnel ==
1982 UCLA Bruins football team roster
Players
Coaches
Offense

Pos.	#	Name	Class
RB		Danny Andrews
TE		Paul Bergmann
QB	12	Steve Bono	Jr
RB		Frank Bruno
WR	83	Cormac Carney	Sr
RB	46	Frank Cephous	Jr
WR		Karl Dorrell
G	59	Dan Dufour	Sr
OT	75	Irv Eatman	Sr
OL		Steve Gemza
C	69	Joe Goebel	Fr
TE		Harper Howell
OT	67	Duval Love	So
OL		Don Mahlstedt
RB		Terry Morehead
RB		Kevin Nelson
QB	10	Rick Neuheisel	Jr
QB	9	David Norrie	Fr
QB	14	Tom Ramsey	Sr
RB		Toa Saipale
RB		Burness Scott
WR	82	Mike Sherrard	Fr
WR	26	Jo-Jo Townsell	Sr
RB		Bryan Wiley
WR	8	Dokie Williams	Sr
OL		Steve Williams
G	68	Blake Wingle	Sr
OL		Chris Yelich
WR	18	Mike Young	So

Defense

Pos.	#	Name	Class
DL		Mike Barbee
LB	39	Neal Dellocono	So
DB		Mike Durden
DL		Mark Ferguson
LB	57	Rex Gray	Jr
LB		Lee Knowles
DB	2	Walter Lang	Sr
LB		Eugene Leoni
LB	27	Blanchard Montgomery	Sr
NG	40	Karl Morgan	Sr
DB	47	Ron Pitts	So
DL		David Randle
S	7	Don Rogers	Jr
DB	21	Lupe Sanchez	Sr
DB		Tom Sullivan
DB	35	Jimmy Turner	Sr
DE	95	Mark Walen	Fr
S	2	Herb Welch	So
LB	41	Doug West	Jr

Special teams

Pos.	#	Name	Class
P		Kevin Buenafe
K	25	John Lee	Fr
K		Ken Potter

Head coach

- Terry Donahue

Coordinators/assistant coaches

Legend

- (C) Team captain
- (S) Suspended
- (I) Ineligible
- Injured
- Redshirt

== 1983 NFL draft ==
The following players were drafted into professional football following the season.

Player	Position	Round	Pick	Franchise
Blanchard Montgomery	Linebacker	3	59	San Francisco 49ers
Jo-Jo Townsell	Wide receiver	3	78	New York Jets
