= 1983 Rose Bowl =

American college football game

- 69th Rose Bowl Game
Michigan Wolverines	UCLA Bruins
(8–3)	(9–1–1)
14	24
Head coach: Bo Schembechler	Head coach: Terry Donahue
AP / Coaches; 19 / 17	AP / Coaches; 5 / 5
	1	2	3	4	Total
Michigan	0	0	7	7	14
UCLA	7	3	7	7	24
- Date: January 1, 1983
- Season: 1982
- Stadium: Rose Bowl
- Location: Pasadena, California
- MVP: Tom Ramsey (UCLA QB); Don Rogers (UCLA FS)
- Favorite: UCLA by 3½ points
- National anthem: Michigan Marching Band
- Referee: John Presley (Pac-10); split crew: Pac-10, Big Ten)
- Halftime show: UCLA Band and Michigan Marching Band
- Attendance: 104,991

United States TV coverage
- Network: NBC
- Announcers: Dick Enberg, Merlin Olsen

The 1983 Rose Bowl was a college football bowl game, played on January 1, 1983. It was the 69th Rose Bowl Game. The UCLA Bruins defeated the Michigan Wolverines by a score of 24–14, in a bowl rematch of a regular season game, also won by UCLA. Tom Ramsey, UCLA quarterback and Don Rogers, UCLA defensive back, were named the Players Of The Game. This was the first season that the UCLA Bruins played in the Rose Bowl stadium as their home stadium, where they were undefeated.

This was the second consecutive Rose Bowl win for the Pac-10, with eight wins in the last nine.

== Teams ==
This game was the third meeting between the UCLA Bruins and the Michigan Wolverines in a 366-day span. They met on December 31, 1981, in the Bluebonnet Bowl. Michigan won that game 33–14, which was the first Big Ten/Pac-10 bowl meeting outside the Rose Bowl. As such, it was labeled the "mini Rose Bowl."

During the regular season on September 25, UCLA played the Wolverines at Michigan Stadium. Quarterback Steve Smith's six-yard run gave Michigan a 14–0 lead and after the Wolverines blocked a Bruin punt and took possession on the UCLA seven, Smith's five-yard pass to Anthony Carter made the score 21–0 with 12:57 remaining in the second quarter.

The Bruins scored two touchdowns and were behind 21–14 at the half in the game at Ann Arbor with one second left to play. The Bruin players headed for the locker room. They had to come back out because Michigan head coach Bo Schembechler had called a time-out with one second left. Ali Haji-Sheikh kicked a 47-yard field goal to increase Michigan's lead to 24–14. When UCLA coach Terry Donahue began to argue with the referees, Schembechler reportedly ran past and screamed, "That's three more points, Terry!" In the second half, the Bruins topped off their greatest point deficit comeback in their history. The Bruins put 17 more points in the second half, while allowing Michigan just one more field goal. An interception by Don Rogers on the second play of the second half gave the Bruins the ball on the Michigan 22-yard line for their first possession of the half. Quarterback Tom Ramsey connected on a six-yard touchdown pass to JoJo Townsell to make it 24–21. Another Michigan field goal pushed the UM advantage up to 27–21 with 4:32 remaining in the third quarter. Dokie Williams returned the ensuing kickoff 65 yards and the Bruins took it in from there on a two-yard run by Kevin Nelson. John Lee's extra point put the Bruins in the lead at 28–27 with 2:50 to play in the third quarter. UCLA won 31–27, overcoming a 21–0 deficit, in what stood as one of the greatest comebacks in Bruin football history until the 2005 Sun Bowl.

=== Michigan Wolverines ===
Michigan started the season 1–2, losing 23–17 at Notre Dame, and losing at home to UCLA 31–27. The Wolverines did not lose again until the final regular season game, falling at rival Ohio State 24–14 after having already clinched the Big Ten title and a Rose Bowl berth.

=== UCLA Bruins ===
The Rose Bowl in Pasadena became UCLA's home stadium this season, after decades at the Los Angeles Memorial Coliseum. Head coach Terry Donahue made a promise that UCLA would end their season in the Rose Bowl game. UCLA opened with 4 straight wins, was tied by Arizona 24–24, then won another three games before a seemingly crushing loss at Washington 10–7. That game gave the Huskies the Pac-10 lead and inside track to the Rose Bowl. UCLA recovered to sneak by John Elway and Stanford 38–35, and went into their game with rival USC needing to beat the Trojans, have fifth-ranked Washington lose at struggling Washington State, AND #8 Arizona State lose at Arizona.

On November 20, the improbable happened. The Bruins beat the Trojans 20–19, when after USC scored a touchdown on the final play of the game, Karl Morgan sacked Scott Tinsley on the two-point conversion attempt to preserve the win. That same day, Washington was upset 24–20 by Washington State in Pullman. The story of the day that overshadowed these circumstances however, was The Play, with Cal defeating Stanford in the Big Game. One week later, Arizona knocked off Arizona State 28–18 and the Bruins were in the Rose Bowl.

== Game summary ==
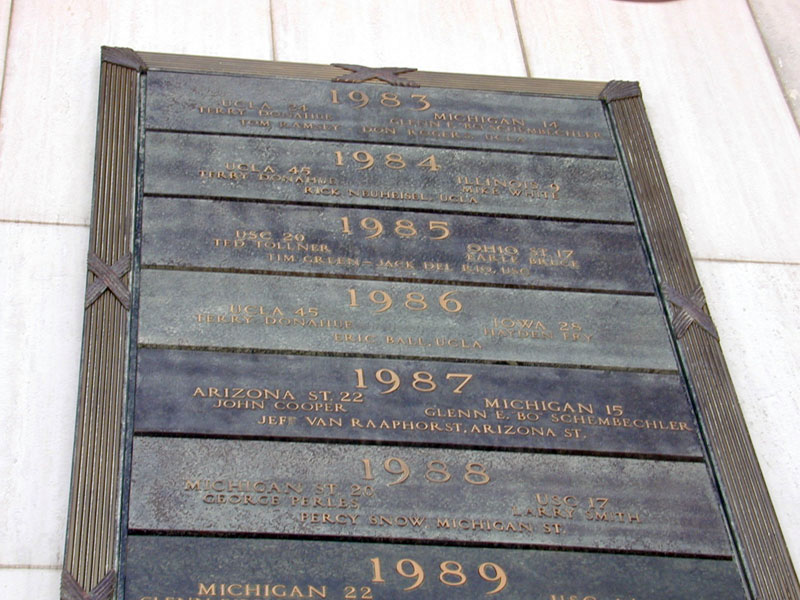
Rose Bowl records at the Hall of Champions

Using a balanced attack led by QB Tom Ramsey, UCLA took a 10–0 lead in the second quarter. In addition, a hard hit by UCLA defensive back Don Rogers separated Michigan QB Steve Smith's shoulder and knocked him out of the game. But backup David Hall got the Wolverines on the board in the third quarter, making the score 10–7. The key drive was early in the third quarter when Tom Ramsey completed seven straight passes, converted numerous 3rd downs, and led UCLA on a brilliant time-consuming drive that was capped by Danny Andrews' 9-yard touchdown run to make the score 17–7.

In the fourth quarter, UCLA got an interception inside the Michigan 20-yard line and scored again for an insurmountable 24–7 lead. Michigan got one last late touchdown for the final score of 24–14. UCLA played a nearly flawless game, with no turnovers and no penalties until taking an intentional delay of game penalty while running out the clock. In the post-game interview it was noted that UCLA was able to neutralize Anthony Carter. Terry Donahue remarked that the loss of Steve Smith was a contributing factor.

=== Scoring ===
==== First quarter ====
- UCLA – Tom Ramsey, one-yard run. John Lee converts.

==== Second quarter ====
- UCLA – Lee kicks 39-yard field goal.

==== Third quarter ====
- Michigan – Eddie Garrett, one-yard pass from Dave Hall. Ali Haji-Sheikh converts.
- UCLA – Danny Andrews, nine-yard run. Lee converts.

==== Fourth quarter ====
- UCLA – Blanchard Montgomery 11-yard interception return. Lee converts.
- Michigan – Dan Rice, four-yard pass from Hall. Haji-Sheikh converts.

=== Statistics ===
Statistics	UCLA	Michigan
First downs	19	19
Total offense - Yards	343	319
Rushes yards (net)	181	110
Passing yards (net)	162	209
Passes, Comp-Att-Int	18–25–0	19–34–3
Penalties–Yards	2–10	3–17

== Notes ==
- Pro and College Football Hall of Fame defensive lineman Merlin Olsen was the grand marshal of the Rose Parade and the game analyst with Dick Enberg for NBC. Enberg and Olsen returned to the Rose Bowl four weeks later to broadcast Super Bowl XVII.

== Aftermath ==
Don Rogers would set an interception record in next year's game, as UCLA repeated as champions. UCLA under Donahue and Michigan under Schembechler met once more, during the 1989 regular season at the Rose Bowl. On September 23, 1989, #5 ranked Michigan defeated #24 ranked UCLA 24–23. This was the first victory of a ten-game winning streak that propelled the Wolverines to the 1990 Rose Bowl.

== See also ==
- List of college football post-season games that were rematches of regular season games
