= 1983 Houston Oilers season =

NFL team season

- Owner: Bud Adams
- General manager: Ladd Herzeg
- Head coach: Ed Biles; Chuck Studley (interim)
- Home stadium: Houston Astrodome

Results
- Record: 2–14
- Division place: 4th AFC Central
- Playoffs: Did not qualify
- Pro Bowlers: RB Earl Campbell

The 1983 Houston Oilers season was the 24th season overall and 14th with the National Football League (NFL). After a strike-shorted 1–8 season, the Oilers traded their second draft choice to the Los Angeles Rams, probably fearing that Eric Dickerson, the player they desired to pick with that second choice, would join the Los Angeles Express of the USFL. Dickerson was cool about playing for the Oilers, while his family was firmly opposed.

The Oilers ultimately made a marginal improvement, winning two games, but failed to qualify for the playoffs for the third consecutive season. The 460 points allowed by the team are the most given up by the team in franchise history.

The week 13 game against Tampa Bay, before which both teams had 1–11 records, was nicknamed the "Repus Bowl". Steve Wulf wrote of the game, "Yes, this was the Small One, the battle of the beatens, the movable object meeting the resistible force. There were only tomorrows. When these two teams get together, nothing can happen. This game was for a marble." Tampa Bay won the game 33–24.

The last remaining active member of the 1983 Houston Oilers was offensive lineman Bruce Matthews, who retired after the 2001 season.

== Offseason ==
=== NFL draft ===
1983 Houston Oilers draft
Round	Pick	Player	Position	College	Notes
1	9	Bruce Matthews * ^{†}	Guard	USC	
2	30	Harvey Salem	Tackle	California	
2	42	Keith Bostic *	Defensive back	Michigan	
3	58	Tim Joiner	Linebacker	LSU	
3	69	Chris Dressel	Tight end	Stanford	
3	83	Steve Brown	Defensive back	Oregon	
4	86	Greg Hill	Defensive back	Oklahoma State	
4	88	Mike McCloskey	Tight end	Penn State	
5	114	Larry Moriarty	Running back	Notre Dame	
5	139	Jerome Foster	Defensive end	Ohio State	
6	142	Steve Haworth	Defensive back	Oklahoma	
7	170	Herkie Walls	Wide receiver	Texas	
8	198	Robert Thompson	Linebacker	Michigan	
9	226	Kevin Potter	Defensive back	Missouri	
Made roster † Pro Football Hall of Fame * Made at least one Pro Bowl during career

== Personnel ==
=== Staff ===
1983 Houston Oilers staff
Front office: Owner/Chairman of the Board/President – Bud Adams; Executive Vice President/General Manager – Ladd Herzeg; Head coaches: Head coach – Ed Biles; Offensive coaches: Offensive coordinator – Kay Dalton; Offensive backs – Elijah Pitts; Receivers – Andy Bourgeois; Tight ends – Vic Rapp; Offensive line – Bill Walsh	Defensive coaches: Defensive coordinator – Chuck Studley; Defensive line – Ralph Staub; Linebackers – Dick Selcer; Defensive backs – Ken Houston; Special teams coaches: Special teams – Vic Rapp; Strength and conditioning: Strength and Conditioning – Bill Allerheiligen

=== Roster ===
1983 Houston Oilers roster
Quarterbacks (QB): 10 Oliver Luck; 14 Gifford Nielsen; 12 Brian Ransom; Running backs (RB): 34 Earl Campbell; 40 Donnie Craft; 45 Dwayne Crutchfield; 35 Stan Edwards; 30 Larry Moriarty; Wide receivers (WR): 81 Steve Bryant; 84 Mike Holston; 85 Carl Roaches; 83 Tim Smith; 86 Herkie Walls; Tight ends (TE): 87 Walt Arnold; 88 Chris Dressel; 89 Mike McCloskey	Offensive linemen (OL): 58 David Carter C; 77 Doug France T; 66 Pat Howell G; 74 Bruce Matthews G; 63 Mike Munchak G; 73 Harvey Salem T; 68 Les Studdard C; 76 Morris Towns T; Defensive linemen (DL): 75 Jesse Baker DE; 78 Jerome Foster DE; 90 Bob Hamm DE; 72 Brian Sochia NT; 67 Mike Stensrud NT; 70 Malcolm Taylor DE	Linebackers (LB): 54 Gregg Bingham ILB; 52 Robert Brazile OLB; 50 Daryl Hunt ILB; 57 Tim Joiner OLB; 53 Avon Riley OLB; 51 Ted Thompson ILB; Defensive backs (DB): 25 Keith Bostic SS; 24 Steve Brown CB; 36 Carter Hartwig FS; 21 Derrick Hatchett CB; 22 Bill Kay CB; 23 Greg Hill CB; 26 Darryl Meadows SS; 20 Willie Tullis CB; 33 J. C. Wilson CB/S; Special teams (ST): 6 John James P; 4 Florian Kempf K	Reserve: 56 Robert Abraham LB (IR); 80 Harold Bailey WR (IR); 65 Elvin Bethea DE (IR); 71 Ken Kennard DE (IR); 37 Mike Reinfeldt S (IR); 82 Mike Renfro WR (IR); 62 John Schuhmacher G (IR); 79 Wilson Whitley NT (NF-Inj.); Rookies in italics

== Schedule ==
Week	Date	Opponent	Result	Record	Venue	Recap
1	September 4	Green Bay Packers	**L** 38–41 (OT)	0–1	Astrodome	Recap
2	September 11	at Los Angeles Raiders	**L** 6–20	0–2	Los Angeles Memorial Coliseum	Recap
3	September 18	**Pittsburgh Steelers**	**L** 28–40	0–3	Astrodome	Recap
4	September 25	at Buffalo Bills	**L** 13–30	0–4	Rich Stadium	Recap
5	October 2	at **Pittsburgh Steelers**	**L** 10–17	0–5	Three Rivers Stadium	Recap
6	October 9	Denver Broncos	**L** 14–26	0–6	Astrodome	Recap
7	October 16	at Minnesota Vikings	**L** 14–34	0–7	Hubert H. Humphrey Metrodome	Recap
8	October 23	Kansas City Chiefs	**L** 10–13 (OT)	0–8	Astrodome	Recap
9	October 30	at **Cleveland Browns**	**L** 19–25 (OT)	0–9	Cleveland Stadium	Recap
10	November 6	**Cincinnati Bengals**	**L** 14–55	0–10	Astrodome	Recap
11	November 13	Detroit Lions	**W** 27–17	1–10	Astrodome	Recap
12	November 20	at **Cincinnati Bengals**	**L** 10–38	1–11	Riverfront Stadium	Recap
13	November 27	at Tampa Bay Buccaneers	**L** 24–33	1–12	Tampa Stadium	Recap
14	December 4	Miami Dolphins	**L** 17–24	1–13	Astrodome	Recap
15	December 11	**Cleveland Browns**	**W** 34–27	2–13	Astrodome	Recap
16	December 18	at Baltimore Colts	**L** 10–20	2–14	Memorial Stadium	Recap
Note: Intra-division opponents are in **bold** text.

=== Season summary ===
==== Week 1 vs Packers ====
Week One: Green Bay Packers (0–0) at Houston Oilers (0–0)

Quarter	1	2	3	4	OT	Total
**Packers**	7	21	3	7	3	**41**
Oilers	10	0	7	21	0	**38**

at Houston Astrodome, Houston, Texas

- Date: September 4
- Game time: 1:00 p.m. EST
- Game weather: Indoors (dome)
- Game attendance: 44,073
- Referee: Bob McElwee
- TV announcers (CBS): Frank Glieber and Dick Vermeil
- Box Score, Box Score

Game information

**First quarter**

- GB – Paul Coffman 25-yard pass from Lynn Dickey (Jan Stenerud kick), 10:31. Packers 7–0. Drive:
- HOU – Florian Kempf 49-yard field goal, 6:30. Packers 7–3. Drive:
- HOU – Tim Smith 47-yard pass from Archie Manning (Florian Kempf kick), 2:40. Oilers 10–7. Drive:

**Second quarter**

- GB – John Jefferson 5-yard pass from Lynn Dickey (Jan Stenerud kick), 8:55. Packers 14–10. Drive:
- GB – John Jefferson 13-yard pass from Lynn Dickey (Jan Stenerud kick), 0:51. Packers 21–10. Drive:
- GB – Gerry Ellis 11-yard pass from Lynn Dickey (Jan Stenerud kick), 0:30. Packers 28–10. Drive:

**Third quarter**

- HOU – Earl Campbell 7-yard run (Florian Kempf kick), 9:08. Packers 28–17. Drive:
- GB – Jan Stenerud 46-yard field goal, 4:36. Packers 31–17. Drive:

**Fourth quarter**

- HOU – Earl Campbell 8-yard run (Florian Kempf kick), 11:05. Packers 31–24. Drive:
- HOU – Earl Campbell 1-yard run (Florian Kempf kick), 4:23. Tie 31–31. Drive:
- GB – James Lofton 74-yard pass from Lynn Dickey (Jan Stenerud kick), 4:13. Packers 38–31. Drive:
- HOU – Larry Moriarty 2-yard run (Florian Kempf kick), 0:48. Tie 38–38. Drive:

**Overtime**

- GB – Jan Stenerud 42-yard field goal, 9:05. Packers 41–38. Drive:

Top passers

- GB – Lynn Dickey – 27/31, 333 yards, 5 TD, INT
- HOU – Archie Manning – 22/34, 348 yards, TD, 2 INT

Top rushers

- GB – Eddie Lee Ivery – 12 rushes, 71 yards
- HOU – Earl Campbell – 27 rushes, 123 yards, 3 TD

Top receivers

- GB – James Lofton – 8 receptions, 154 yards, TD
- HOU – Tim Smith – 8 receptions, 197 yards, TD

==== Week 11 vs Lions ====
Week Eleven: Detroit Lions (5–5) at Houston Oilers (0–10)

Quarter	1	2	3	4	Total
Lions	0	10	7	0	**17**
**Oilers**	3	7	14	3	**27**

at Houston Astrodome, Houston, Texas

- Date: November 13, 1983
- Game time: 1:00 p.m.
- Game weather: Indoors (dome)
- Game attendance: 40,660
- Referee: Bob Frederic
- Box Score, Box Score

Team	Category	Player	Statistics
Lions	Passing	Eric Hipple	17/29, 213 Yds, 3 INT
Lions	Rushing	Billy Sims	20 Rush, 105 Yds, TD
Lions	Receiving	Billy Sims	9 Rec, 90 Yds
Oilers	Passing	Oliver Luck	18/26, 189 Yds, 2 TD, INT
Oilers	Rushing	Earl Campbell	28 Rush, 107 Yds
Oilers	Receiving	Mike Renfro	7 Rec, 75 Yds

Scoring summary

Quarter	Time	Drive			Team	Scoring information	Score	
Quarter	Time	Plays	Yards	TOP	Team	Scoring information	DET	HOU
1	8:02				Oilers	47-yard field goal by Florian Kempf	0	3
2	12:48				Lions	Billy Sims 1-yard touchdown run, Eddie Murray kick good	7	3
2	3:48				Lions	35-yard field goal by Eddie Murray	10	3
2	0:50				Oilers	Mike McCloskey 13-yard touchdown reception from Oliver Luck, Florian Kempf kick good	10	10
3	10:25				Lions	James Jones 3-yard touchdown reception from Gary Danielson, Eddie Murray kick good	17	10
3	9:12				Oilers	Chris Dressel 13-yard touchdown reception from Oliver Luck, Florian Kempf kick good	17	17
3	1:01				Oilers	Larry Moriarty 4-yard touchdown run, Florian Kempf kick good	17	24
4	13:08				Oilers	21-yard field goal by Florian Kempf	17	27
"TOP" = time of possession. For other American football terms, see Glossary of American football.							17	27

=== Standings ===
AFC Central
	W	L	T	PCT	DIV	CONF	PF	PA	STK
^{(3)} Pittsburgh Steelers	10	6	0	.625	4–2	8–4	355	303	L1
Cleveland Browns	9	7	0	.563	3–3	7–5	356	342	W1
Cincinnati Bengals	7	9	0	.438	4–2	4–8	346	302	L1
Houston Oilers	2	14	0	.125	1–5	1–11	288	460	L1
