= 1983 Fiesta Bowl =

- 12th Fiesta Bowl
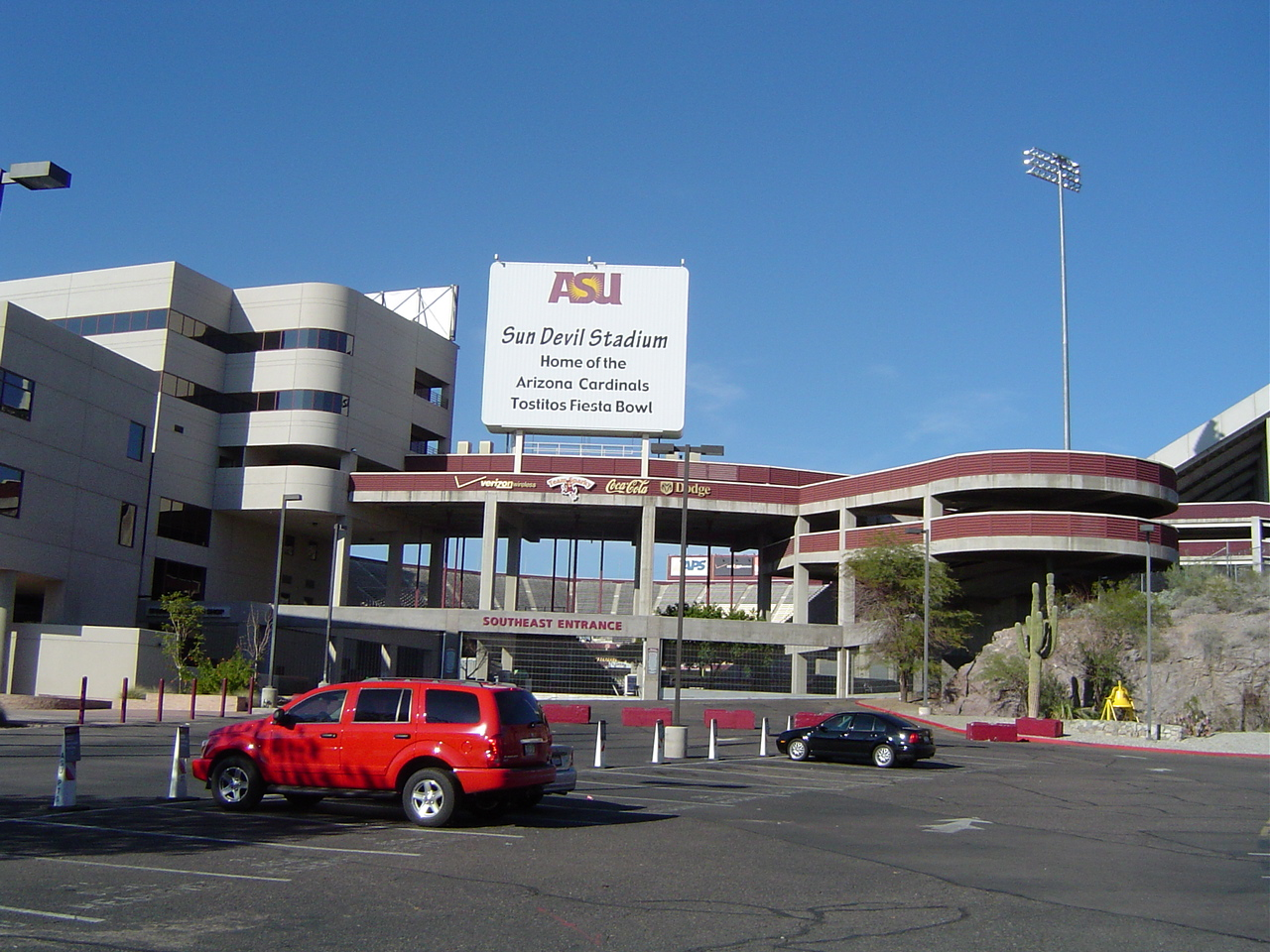
- Sun Devil Stadium in Tempe, Arizona, hosted the Fiesta Bowl.
Arizona State Sun Devils	Oklahoma Sooners
(9–2)	(8–3)
Pac-10	Big 8
32	21
Head coach: Darryl Rogers	Head coach: Barry Switzer
AP / Coaches; 11 / 11	AP / Coaches; 12 / 10
	1	2	3	4	Total
Arizona State	0	11	7	14	32
Oklahoma	7	6	8	0	21
- Date: January 1, 1983
- Season: 1982
- Stadium: Sun Devil Stadium
- Location: Tempe, Arizona
- MVP: Marcus Dupree (OU HB); Jim Jeffcoat (ASU DL)
- Favorite: Oklahoma by 2½ points
- Referee: Bill Parkinson (Eastern Independent)
- Attendance: 66,484

United States TV coverage
- Network: NBC
- Announcers: Charlie Jones, Len Dawson
- Nielsen ratings: 7.9

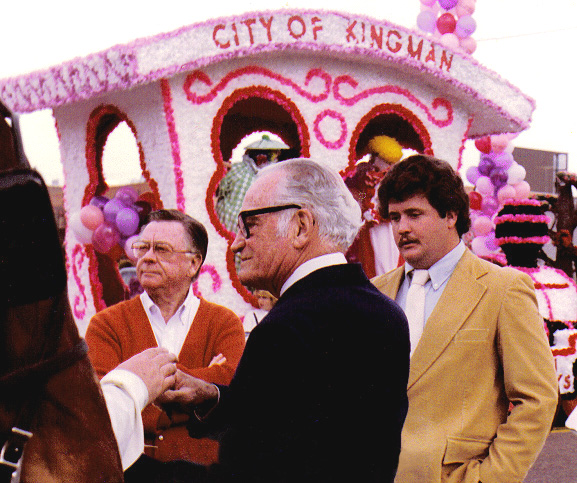
Senator Barry Goldwater at the 1983 Fiesta Bowl Parade

The 1983 Fiesta Bowl was the twelfth edition of the college football bowl game, played at Sun Devil Stadium in Tempe, Arizona on Saturday, January 1. Part of the 1982–83 bowl game season, it matched the eleventh-ranked Arizona State Sun Devils of the Pacific-10 Conference and the #12 Oklahoma Sooners of the Big Eight Conference. A slight underdog, Arizona State rallied in the fourth quarter to win on its home field, 32–21.

== Teams ==
This was the first-ever meeting between these two programs.

=== Arizona State ===
The Sun Devils opened with nine wins and were ranked third, but lost to Washington at home and at rival Arizona. This was ASU's sixth Fiesta Bowl appearance, which remains their only one since leaving the Western Athletic Conference (WAC) in 1978.

=== Oklahoma ===
The Sooners' first two home games in September were losses, to West Virginia and USC. They won seven straight but lost to rival Nebraska on the road. This was their second appearance in the Fiesta Bowl.

== Game summary ==
Televised by NBC, the game kicked off shortly after 11:30 a.m. MST, as did the Cotton Bowl on CBS. The weather was sunny and 65 °F (18 °C).

Oklahoma scored first on a one-yard run from running back Stanley Wilson, giving the Sooners a 7–0 lead. In the second quarter, Arizona State got a field goal from kicker Luis Zendejas to cut the lead to 7–3. Their defense later forced a safety, to make it 7–5. Zendejas kicked another 22-yard field goal to give Arizona State its first lead of the game at 8–7.

Wilson scored on his second rushing touchdown of the game to give Oklahoma a 13–8 lead. Zendejas answered with a 54-yard field goal to cut Oklahoma's lead to 13–11 at halftime.

In the third quarter, Darryl Clack scored on a 15-yard run and Arizona State regained the lead at 18–13. Sooner running back Fred Sims rushed 19 yards for a touchdown, and the ensuing two-point conversion attempt was successful, giving Oklahoma a 21–18 lead.

In the fourth quarter, the Sun Devils got a one-yard touchdown run from Alvin Moore to take a 25–21 lead. ASU quarterback Todd Hons threw a 48-yard touchdown pass to Ron Brown to make the score 32–21. The Sun Devils hung on to post that final score.

Though Arizona State won the game, Oklahoma tailback Marcus Dupree was named the offensive MVP with 239 rushing yards on 17 carries (14.0 avg.). Amazingly, Dupree played only a little over half of the game, leaving three times due to a broken finger, an ankle injury, a rib injury, and a pulled hamstring. He set the rushing record for yards in the Fiesta Bowl, which still stands. ASU defensive lineman Jim Jeffcoat was the defensive MVP.

=== Scoring ===
First quarter

- OU – Stanley Wilson 1-yard run (Michael Keeling kick)

Second quarter

- ASU – Luis Zendejas 32-yard field goal
- ASU – Safety; quarterback Kelly Phelps tackled in end zone
- ASU – Zendejas 22-yard field goal
- OU – Wilson 1-yard run (run failed)
- ASU – Zendejas 54-yard field goal

Third quarter

- ASU – Darryl Clack 15-yard run (Zendejas kick)
- OU – Fred Sims 19-yard run (Johnny Fontenette pass from Phelps)

Fourth quarter

- ASU – Alvin Moore 1-yard run (Zendejas kick)
- ASU – Ron Brown 52-yard pass from Todd Hons (Zendejas kick)

== Statistics ==
Statistics	Arizona State	Oklahoma
First downs	25	19
Yards rushing	43–100	63–417
Yards passing	329	40
Passing	17–35–2	4–10–1
Return yards	−3	35
Total Offense	78–429	73–457
Punts–Average	6–43.5	4–29.5
Fumbles–Lost	3–0	6–4
Turnovers	2	5
Penalties–Yards	7–64	8–68
Time of Possession	30:31	29:29

== Aftermath ==
Arizona State climbed to sixth in the final AP poll, and Oklahoma fell to sixteenth.
