= 1982 California Golden Bears football team =

American college football season

1982 California Golden Bears football
- Conference: Pacific-10 Conference
- Record: 7–4 (4–4 Pac-10)
- Head coach: Joe Kapp (1st season)
- Home stadium: California Memorial Stadium

1982 Pacific-10 Conference football standings
	Conf.					Overall
Team	W		L		T	W		L		T
No. 5 UCLA $	5	–	1	–	1	10	–	1	–	1
No. 7 Washington	6	–	2	–	0	10	–	2	–	0
No. 6 Arizona State	5	–	2	–	0	10	–	2	–	0
No. 15 USC	5	–	2	–	0	8	–	3	–	0
Arizona	4	–	3	–	1	6	–	4	–	1
California	4	–	4	–	0	7	–	4	–	0
Stanford	3	–	5	–	0	5	–	6	–	0
Washington State	2	–	4	–	1	3	–	7	–	1
Oregon	2	–	6	–	0	2	–	8	–	1
Oregon State	0	–	7	–	1	1	–	9	–	1
$ – Conference champion; Rankings from AP Poll

The 1982 California Golden Bears football team represented the University of California, Berkeley during the 1982 NCAA Division I-A football season. For the Golden Bears this season is historically known for its last game – the 85th Big Game against Stanford on November 20, 1982. Specifically – The Play. A last-second kickoff return on which Cal was able to score a touchdown to win the game. Because of the context of the rivalry, the timing of the play and the unusual multi-lateral way that it occurred, it is recognized as one of the most memorable plays in college football history and among the most memorable in American sports.

== Schedule ==
Date	Time	Opponent	Site	TV	Result	Attendance	Source
September 11	12:31 p.m.	at Colorado*	Folsom Field; Boulder, CO		W 31–17	33,835	
September 18	1:02 p.m.	San Diego State*	California Memorial Stadium; Berkeley, CA		W 28–0	35,000	
September 25	1:05 p.m.	No. 14 Arizona State	California Memorial Stadium; Berkeley, CA		L 0–15	35,673	
October 2	12:36 p.m.	San Jose State*	California Memorial Stadium; Berkeley, CA		W 26–7	37,000–37,136	
October 9	1:00 p.m.	at No. 1 Washington	Husky Stadium; Seattle, WA	ABC	L 7–50	56,500	
October 16	1:04 p.m.	Oregon	California Memorial Stadium; Berkeley, CA		W 10–7	31,736	
October 23	1:06 p.m.	No. 11 UCLA	California Memorial Stadium; Berkeley, CA (rivalry)		L 31–47	51,600	
October 30	1:00 p.m.	at Oregon State	Parker Stadium; Corvallis, OR		W 28–14	25,000	
November 6		at No. 16 USC	Los Angeles Memorial Coliseum; Los Angeles, CA		L 0–42	54,670	
November 13	1:01 p.m.	Washington State	California Memorial Stadium; Berkeley, CA		W 34–14	34,060	
November 20	1:05 p.m.	Stanford	California Memorial Stadium; Berkeley, CA (Big Game)	USA	W 25–20	75,662	
*Non-conference game; Rankings from AP Poll released prior to the game; All times are in Pacific time

== Game summaries ==
=== Stanford ===
Stanford at California
85th Big Game

Team	1	2	3	4	Total
Cardinal	0	0	14	6	20
• Golden Bears	0	10	0	15	25

- Date: November 20
- Location: California Memorial Stadium • Berkeley, California
- Game attendance: 75,662
- Referee: Charles Moffett
- TV announcers (USA): Barry Tompkins and John Beasley

Scoring summary
2	9:22	CAL	Joe Cooper 31-yard field goal	Cal 3–0
2	2:42	CAL	Mariet Ford 29-yard pass from Gale Gilbert (Joe Cooper kick)	Cal 10–0
3	5:29	STAN	Vincent White 2-yard pass from John Elway (Mark Harmon kick)	Cal 10–7
3	1:42	STAN	Vincent White 43-yard pass from John Elway (Mark Harmon kick)	Stanford 14–10
4	13:28	CAL	Joe Cooper 31-yard field goal	Stanford 14–13
4	11:24	CAL	Wes Howell 32 yard pass from Gale Gilbert (pass failed)	Cal 19–14
4	5:32	STAN	Mark Harmon 22-yard field goal	Cal 19–17
4	0:04	STAN	Mark Harmon 35-yard field goal	Stanford 20–19
4	0:00	CAL	Kevin Moen 25-yard kickoff return after numerous laterals (conversion not attempted)	Cal 25–20

== Roster ==
1982 California Golden Bears football team roster
Players
Coaches
Offense

Pos.	#	Name	Class
RB		Dwight Garner
QB	14	Gale Gilbert	So
TE	86	David Lewis	Jr
OT	73	Harvey Salem	Sr
QB	11	J Torchio	Jr
FB	31	John Tuggle	Sr

Defense

Pos.	#	Name	Class
DT	90	Reggie Camp	Sr
LB	48	Tim Lucas	Sr
S	26	Kevin Moen	Sr
LB	80	Ron Rivera	Jr

Special teams

Pos.	#	Name	Class
P	7	Mike Ahr	Sr
K	9	Joe Cooper	Sr

Head coach

- Joe Kapp

Coordinators/assistant coaches

- Sam Gruneisen (offensive line)

Legend

- (C) Team captain
- (S) Suspended
- (I) Ineligible
- Injured
- Redshirt

Not listed: Mariet Ford, Richard Rodgers

== 1983 NFL draft ==
Player	Position	Round	Pick	NFL club
Harvey Salem	Tackle	2	30	Houston Oilers)
Reggie Camp	Defensive end	3	68	Cleveland Browns
Wes Howell	Tight end	4	105	New York Jets
Tim Lucas	Linebacker	10	269	St. Louis Cardinals
John Tuggle	Running back	12	335	New York Giants
