= Brian Ransom =

Brian Ransom may refer to:

- Brian Ransom (gridiron football) (born 1960), American football player
- Brian Ransom (politician) (1940–2020), Canadian politician
