= Skansi =

Skansi is a surname. Notable people with the surname include:

- Paul Skansi (born 1961), American football player
- Petar Skansi (1943–2022), Croatian basketball player
