= 1982 Stanford Cardinal football team =

American college football season

1982 Stanford Cardinal football
- Conference: Pacific-10 Conference
- Record: 5–6 (3–5 Pac-10)
- Head coach: Paul Wiggin (3rd season)
- Offensive coordinator: Jim Fassel (2nd season)
- Offensive scheme: West Coast
- Defensive coordinator: Fred von Appen (1st season)
- Base defense: 4–3
- Home stadium: Stanford Stadium

1982 Pacific-10 Conference football standings
	Conf.					Overall
Team	W		L		T	W		L		T
No. 5 UCLA $	5	–	1	–	1	10	–	1	–	1
No. 7 Washington	6	–	2	–	0	10	–	2	–	0
No. 6 Arizona State	5	–	2	–	0	10	–	2	–	0
No. 15 USC	5	–	2	–	0	8	–	3	–	0
Arizona	4	–	3	–	1	6	–	4	–	1
California	4	–	4	–	0	7	–	4	–	0
Stanford	3	–	5	–	0	5	–	6	–	0
Washington State	2	–	4	–	1	3	–	7	–	1
Oregon	2	–	6	–	0	2	–	8	–	1
Oregon State	0	–	7	–	1	1	–	9	–	1
$ – Conference champion; Rankings from AP Poll

The 1982 Stanford Cardinal football team represented Stanford University in the Pacific-10 Conference in the 1982 NCAA Division I-A football season. Led by third-year head coach Paul Wiggin, the Cardinal had an overall record of 5–6 (3–5 in Pac-10, seventh).

This was the first football season for Stanford's new singular nickname Cardinal; from 1972 to 1981, it was the plural Cardinals. Both represented the color.

With consensus All-American John Elway at quarterback, the 1982 Cardinal were exciting - seven of its eleven games were decided in the fourth quarter - but maddeningly erratic:

- After an impressive opening road win at Purdue, the Cardinal dropped a 35–31 decision at home to unranked San Jose State, coached by Elway's father Jack, who became Stanford's head coach in 1984.
- In week 3 at #12 Ohio State, Stanford won on a last-minute eighty-yard drive, scoring the decisive TD with 34 seconds remaining.
- In week 5 at #11 Arizona State, Stanford scored a go-ahead touchdown in the final minute, only to lose on a Sun Devil TD with eleven seconds left on the clock.
- In week 7 at Washington State, the Cardinal scored the winning touchdown with 22 seconds left.
- In week 8 at home, Stanford scored thirty consecutive points to decisively defeat previously unbeaten #2 Washington 43–31, which put Elway on the cover of Sports Illustrated.
- In week 9, at home against unranked Arizona, it gave up 28 unanswered fourth quarter points to lose by fourteen.

After a hard-fought 38–35 loss at Rose Bowl-bound and 12th-ranked UCLA in week 10, the Cardinal traveled to Berkeley for its final scheduled game.

Elway's last football game at Stanford was one of the most famous games of all time, the 1982 Big Game versus rival California. It ended with "The Play," a kickoff return for a touchdown with four backward lateral passes and one forward lateral pass that allowed Cal to win the game as time expired.

After that game, Elway congratulated the Stanford Band trombone player that got run over in the end zone. Although Elway never led Stanford to a bowl game, he had an accomplished college career. In his four seasons (1979–1982), he completed 774 passes for 9,349 yards and 77 touchdowns. Stanford had a 20–23–1 (.466) record during his tenure. Elway's 24 touchdown passes in 1982 led the nation, and he left with nearly every Stanford and Pacific-10 career record for passing and total offense. Elway won Pac-10 Player of the Year honors for the second time in 1982, and was a consensus All-American. In addition, he finished second in Heisman Trophy balloting.

== Schedule ==
Date	Time	Opponent	Site	TV	Result	Attendance	Source
September 11	10:33 a.m.	at Purdue*	Ross–Ade Stadium; West Lafayette, IN		W 35–14	64,381	
September 18	1:35 p.m.	San Jose State*	Stanford Stadium; Stanford, CA (rivalry)	CBS	L 31–35	60,789	
September 25	9:37 a.m.	at No. 13 Ohio State*	Ohio Stadium; Columbus, OH	ABC	W 23–20	89,436	
October 2	1:32 p.m.	Oregon State	Stanford Stadium; Stanford, CA		W 45–5	39,400–41,138	
October 9	6:30 p.m.	at No. 11 Arizona State	Sun Devil Stadium; Tempe, AZ		L 17–21	70,823	
October 16	12:48 p.m.	No. 14 USC	Stanford Stadium; Stanford, CA (rivalry)	CBS	L 21–41	73,859–75,185	
October 23	1:02 p.m.	at Washington State	Martin Stadium; Pullman, WA		W 31–26	26,806	
October 30	12:50 p.m.	No. 2 Washington	Stanford Stadium; Stanford, CA	ABC	W 43–31	53,871–55,213	
November 6	1:05 p.m.	Arizona	Stanford Stadium; Stanford, CA		L 27–41	41,789	
November 13		at No. 12 UCLA	Rose Bowl; Pasadena, CA (rivalry)		L 35–38	78,452	
November 20	1:05 p.m.	at California	California Memorial Stadium; Berkeley, CA (Big Game)	USA	L 20–25	75,662	
*Non-conference game; Rankings from AP Poll released prior to the game; All times are in Pacific time

== Game summaries ==
=== At Ohio State ===
Stanford at Ohio State

Team	1	2	3	4	Total
• Cardinal	0	0	13	10	23
No. 13 Buckeyes	3	10	0	7	20

- Date: September 25
- Location: Ohio Stadium • Columbus, OH
- Game attendance: 89,436
- Referee: Glenn Fortin (Big Ten)
- TV announcers (ABC): Keith Jackson and Frank Broyles

Scoring summary
1	4:22	OSU	Spangler 31-yard field goal	OSU 3–0
2	14:58	OSU	Broadnax 1-yard run (Spangler kick)	OSU 10–0
2	0:13	OSU	Spangler 24-yard field goal	OSU 13–0
3	10:56	STAN	Harmon 23-yard field goal	OSU 13–3
3	6:26	STAN	Harmon 24-yard field goal	OSU 13–6
3	3:30	STAN	Dotterer 11-yard pass from John Elway (Harmon kick)	Tied 13–13
4	8:47	OSU	Spencer 2-yard run (Spangler kick)	OSU 20–13
4	4:15	STAN	Harmon 47-yard field goal	OSU 20–16
4	0:34	STAN	Harry 18-yard pass from Elway (Harmon kick)	Stanford 23–20

John Elway threw for 407 yards and 2 touchdowns, including the game-winner to Emile Harry with 34 seconds remaining.

=== Washington ===
Washington at Stanford

Team	1	2	3	4	Total
No. 2 Huskies	10	7	7	7	31
• Cardinal	7	17	13	6	43

- Date: October 30
- Location: Stanford Stadium Stanford, California
- Game attendance: 53,871–55,213
- TV announcers (ABC): Keith Jackson and Frank Broyles

=== At California ===
Stanford at California

Team	1	2	3	4	Total
Cardinal	0	0	14	6	20
• Golden Bears	0	10	0	15	25

- Date: November 20
- Location: California Memorial Stadium • Berkeley, California
- Game attendance: 75,662
- Referee: Charles Moffett
- TV announcers (USA): Barry Tompkins and John Beasley

Scoring summary
2	9:22	CAL	Joe Cooper 31-yard field goal	Cal 3–0
2	2:42	CAL	Mariet Ford 29-yard pass from Gale Gilbert (Joe Cooper kick)	Cal 10–0
3	5:29	STAN	Vincent White 2-yard pass from John Elway (Mark Harmon kick)	Cal 10–7
3	1:42	STAN	Vincent White 43-yard pass from John Elway (Mark Harmon kick)	Stanford 14–10
4	13:28	CAL	Joe Cooper 31-yard field goal	Stanford 14–13
4	11:24	CAL	Wes Howell 32 yard pass from Gale Gilbert (pass failed)	Cal 19–14
4	5:32	STAN	Mark Harmon 22-yard field goal	Cal 19–17
4	0:04	STAN	Mark Harmon 35-yard field goal	Stanford 20–19
4	0:00	CAL	Kevin Moen 25-yard kickoff return after numerous laterals (Kick failed)	Cal 25–20

== Personnel ==
=== Coaching staff ===
- Head coach – Paul Wiggin (Stanford '57)
- Associate head coach – Ray Handley (Stanford '66)
- Offensive coordinator – Jim Fassel (USC '70)
- Defensive coordinator – Larry Mac Duff (CSU-Fullerton '71)
- Running backs – Jim Anderson (Cal Western '70)
- Defensive backs – Chuck Detwiler (Utah State '68)
- Offensive line – Dick James (UC Davis '62)
- Receivers and tight ends – Dave Ottmar (Stanford '74)
- Defensive line – Fred von Appen (Linfield '64)
- Asst. coach – offensive line – Pete Mangurian (Louisiana State '77)
- Asst. coach – secondary – Mike Nolan (Oregon '80)

=== Roster ===
1982 Stanford Cardinal football team roster
Players
Coaches
Offense

Pos.	#	Name	Class
WR	42	Steve Brown
RB	24	Mike Dotterer	Sr
TE	88	Chris Dressel	Sr
QB	7	John Elway	Sr
WR	10	Emile Harry	So
OT		Chris Rose	Sr
WR	26	Mike Tolliver	Jr
RB	22	Vincent White	Sr

Defense

Pos.	#	Name	Class
LB	86	Kevin Bates
ILB	56	Louis Arvanetes	Sr
S	20	Rod Gilmore	Sr

Special teams

Pos.	#	Name	Class
PK	8	Mark Harmon	So

Head coach

- Paul Wiggin (3rd year)

Coordinators/assistant coaches

- Ray Handley – Associate head coach
- Jim Fassel – Offensive Coordinator
- Jim Anderson – Running back
- Dave Ottmar – Tight end
- Dick James – Offensive line
- Larry Mac Duff – Defensive line
- Fred von Appen – Defensive coordinator
- Chuck Detwiler – Defensive back

Legend

- (C) Team captain
- (S) Suspended
- (I) Ineligible
- Injured
- Redshirt

== Awards and honors ==
- John Elway: Sammy Baugh Trophy, Pac-10 Player of the Year, Consensus First-team All-American, 2nd in Heisman Trophy voting

== NFL draft ==
Player	Position	Round	Pick	NFL club
John Elway	Quarterback	1	1	Baltimore Colts (later traded to Denver)
Chris Dressel	Tight end	3	69	Houston Oilers
Vincent White	Running back	6	163	New York Jets
Mike Dotterer	Running back	8	222	Los Angeles Raiders
Chris Rose	Tackle	9	241	Baltimore Colts
