= Neal Dellocono =

American football player (born 1963)

Profile
- Position: Linebacker

Personal information
- Born: June 1, 1963 (age 63); Baton Rouge, Louisiana, U.S.
- Listed height: 6 ft 1 in (1.85 m)
- Listed weight: 219 lb (99 kg)

Career information
- High school: Catholic (Baton Rouge)
- College: UCLA
- NFL draft: 1985: 11th round, 297th overall pick

Career history
- Dallas Cowboys (1985); Houston Oilers (1987)

Awards and highlights
- Third-team All-American (1983); First-team All-Pac-10 (1983)

Neal Dellocono (born June 1, 1963) is an American former professional football player who was a linebacker in the National Football League (NFL) for the Dallas Cowboys and Houston Oilers. He played college football for the UCLA Bruins.

== Early life ==
Dellocono attended Catholic High School, where he played defensive back, running back and wide receiver. He rushed for 215 yards and 4 touchdowns in one game. As a senior, he received All-state and All-American honors.

He also practiced basketball, baseball and track.

== College career ==
Dellocono accepted a football scholarship from the University of California, Los Angeles (UCLA). As a freshman, he was named the team's defensive rookie of the year. As a sophomore, he became a regular starter at outside linebacker and led the team with 6 sacks (tied for fourth in school history). He also contributed to the 24-14 victory against the University of Michigan in the 1983 Rose Bowl.

As a junior, he was part of the 45-9 victory against the University of Illinois in the 1984 Rose Bowl. As a senior, he was named the team's defensive MVP, while leading his squad with 9 sacks (tied school record) and 3 fumble recoveries. He also had one interception.

He finished his college career with 287 tackles (fifth in school history), 33 tackles for loss (third in school history), 17 sacks (tied for second in school history), 3 interceptions and a streak of 35 straight starts.

== Professional career ==
Dellocono was selected by the Dallas Cowboys in the 11th round (297th overall) of the 1985 NFL draft. He also was selected by the Memphis Showboats in the 1985 USFL Territorial Draft. He suffered an ankle injury in the second game of the preseason against the San Diego Chargers. He was placed on the injured reserve list on August 20. He was waived during the season. He was re-signed in 1986. He was released in August.

On February 24, 1987, he was signed as a free agent by the Houston Oilers. He was placed on the injured reserve list on August 31. He wasn't re-signed after the season.
