= 1982 Arizona State Sun Devils football team =

American college football season

1982 Arizona State Sun Devils football

Fiesta Bowl champion

Fiesta Bowl, W 32–21 vs. Oklahoma
- Conference: Pacific-10 Conference

Ranking
- Coaches: No. 6
- AP: No. 6
- Record: 10–2 (5–2 Pac-10)
- Head coach: Darryl Rogers (3rd season)
- Offensive coordinator: Bob Baker (3rd season)
- Defensive coordinator: Al Luginbill (1st season)
- Home stadium: Sun Devil Stadium

1982 Pacific-10 Conference football standings
	Conf.					Overall
Team	W		L		T	W		L		T
No. 5 UCLA $	5	–	1	–	1	10	–	1	–	1
No. 7 Washington	6	–	2	–	0	10	–	2	–	0
No. 6 Arizona State	5	–	2	–	0	10	–	2	–	0
No. 15 USC	5	–	2	–	0	8	–	3	–	0
Arizona	4	–	3	–	1	6	–	4	–	1
California	4	–	4	–	0	7	–	4	–	0
Stanford	3	–	5	–	0	5	–	6	–	0
Washington State	2	–	4	–	1	3	–	7	–	1
Oregon	2	–	6	–	0	2	–	8	–	1
Oregon State	0	–	7	–	1	1	–	9	–	1
$ – Conference champion; Rankings from AP Poll

The 1982 Arizona State Sun Devils football team was an American football team that represented Arizona State University as a member of the Pacific-10 Conference (Pac-10) during the 1982 NCAA Division I-A football season. In their third season under head coach Darryl Rogers, the Sun Devils compiled a 10–2 record (5–2 against Pac-10 opponents), finished in a tie for third place in the Pac-10, and outscored their opponents by a combined total of 294 to 145.

The team's statistical leaders included Todd Hons with 2,338 passing yards, Darryl Clack with 606 rushing yards, and Doug Allen with 424 receiving yards.

== Schedule ==
Date	Time	Opponent	Rank	Site	TV	Result	Attendance	Source
September 4	2:00 p.m.	at Oregon	No. 19	Autzen Stadium; Eugene, OR		W 34–3	23,127	
September 11	8:30 p.m.	Utah*	No. 15	Sun Devil Stadium; Tempe, AZ		W 23–10	59,723	
September 18		at Houston*	No. 13	Houston Astrodome; Houston, TX		W 24–10	30,103	
September 25	2:05 p.m.	at California	No. 14	California Memorial Stadium; Berkeley, CA		W 15–0	35,673	
October 2		Kansas State*	No. 13	Sun Devil Stadium; Tempe, AZ		W 30–7	61,824	
October 9	7:30 p.m.	Stanford	No. 11	Sun Devil Stadium; Tempe, AZ		W 21–17	70,823	
October 16		UTEP*	No. 10	Sun Devil Stadium; Tempe, AZ		W 37–6	25,203	
October 30		No. 12 USC	No. 7	Sun Devil Stadium; Tempe, AZ		W 17–10	71,071	
November 6		Oregon State^{†}	No. 4	Sun Devil Stadium; Tempe, AZ		W 30–16	62,316	
November 13		No. 7 Washington	No. 3	Sun Devil Stadium; Tempe, AZ		L 13–17	72,021	
November 27		at Arizona	No. 8	Arizona Stadium; Tucson, AZ (rivalry)		L 18–28	58,515	
January 1, 1983	11:30 a.m.	vs. No. 12 Oklahoma*	No. 11	Sun Devil Stadium; Tempe, AZ (Fiesta Bowl)	NBC	W 32–21	70,553	
*Non-conference game; ^{†}Homecoming; Rankings from AP Poll released prior to the game; All times are in Mountain time

== Rankings ==
Ranking movements Legend: ██ Increase in ranking ██ Decrease in ranking — = Not ranked
	Week															
Poll	Pre	1	2	3	4	5	6	7	8	9	10	11	12	13	14	Final
AP	19	15	13	14	13	11	10	8	7	4	3	8	6	11	11	6
Coaches Poll	—	—	—	—	—	—	—	—	—	—	—	—	—	12	11	6

== Game summaries ==
=== Washington ===
Washington at Arizona State

Team	1	2	3	4	Total
• No. 7 Huskies	0	10	7	0	17
No. 3 Sun Devils	0	3	7	3	13

- Date: November 13
- Location: Sun Devil Stadium, Tempe, AZ
- Game attendance: 72,021

Scoring summary
2		WASH	Williams 20-yard pass from Cowan (Nelson kick)	WASH 7–0
2		WASH	Nelson 24-yard field goal	WASH 10–0
2	1:53	ASU	Luis Zendejas 29-yard field goal	WASH 10–3
3		WASH	Robinson 4-yard run (Nelson kick)	WASH 17–3
3		ASU	Clack 50-yard run (Zendejas kick)	WASH 17–10
4		ASU	Zendejas 47-yard field goal	WASH 17–13

=== Vs. Oklahoma (Fiesta Bowl) ===
Arizona State vs. Oklahoma

Team	1	2	3	4	Total
• No. 11 Sun Devils	0	11	7	14	32
No. 12 Sooners	7	6	8	0	21

- Date: January 1
- Location: Sun Devil Stadium, Tempe, Arizona
- Game attendance: 70,553
- TV announcers (NBC): Charlie Jones, Len Dawson

Scoring summary
1	OU	Stanley Wilson 1-yard run (kick)	OU 7–0
2	ASU	Luis Zendejas 32-yard field goal	OU 7–3
2	ASU	Safety, Kelly Phelps tackled in end zone	OU 7–5
2	ASU	Luis Zendejas 22-yard field goal	ASU 8–7
2	OU	Stanley Wilson 1-yard run (run failed)	OU 13–8
2	ASU	Luis Zendejas 54-yard field goal	OU 13–11
3	ASU	Darryl Clack 15-yard run (Zendejas kick)	ASU 18–13
3	OU	Fred Sims 19-yard run (Fontenette pass from Phelps)	OU 21–18
4	ASU	Alvin Moore 1-yard run (Zendejas kick)	ASU 25–21
4	ASU	Ron Brown 52-yard pass from Todd Hons (Zendejas kick)	ASU 32–21

== Roster ==
1982 Arizona State Sun Devils football team roster
Players
Coaches
Offense

Pos.	#	Name	Class
WR		Doug Allen	So
WR		Ron Brown	Sr
RB	42	Darryl Clack	Fr
RB		Willie Gittens	Sr
QB	1	Todd Hons	Jr
TE	85	Ron Wetzel	Sr

Defense

Pos.	#	Name	Class
DL	50	Bryan Caldwell	Sr
CB	14	Duane Galloway	So
DE	93	Jim Jeffcoat	Sr
LB	54	Vernon Maxwell	Sr
SS	4	Paul Moyer	Sr
CB	25	Mike Richardson	Sr
DE		Walt Bowyer	Sr

Special teams

Pos.	#	Name	Class
DB/KR		Rich Edwards	Fr
K	8	Luis Zendejas	So
P		Mike Black	Sr

Head coach

- Darryl Rogers

Coordinators/assistant coaches

- Al Luginbill – Defensive coordinator

Legend

- (C) Team captain
- (S) Suspended
- (I) Ineligible
- Injured
- Redshirt

== 1983 NFL draft ==
Player	Position	Round	Pick	NFL club
Jim Jeffcoat	Defensive end	1	23	Dallas Cowboys
Vernon Maxwell	Linebacker	2	29	Baltimore Colts
Mike Richardson	Cornerback	2	33	Chicago Bears
Ron Brown	Wide receiver	2	41	Cleveland Browns
Bryan Caldwell	Defensive end	3	70	Dallas Cowboys
Ron Wetzel	Tight end	4	92	Kansas City Chiefs
Alvin Moore	Running back	7	169	Baltimore Colts
Mike Black	Punter	7	181	Detroit Lions
Walt Bowyer	Defensive end	10	254	Denver Broncos
