= 1982 All-Pacific-10 Conference football team =

The 1982 All-Pacific-10 Conference football team consists of American football players chosen by various organizations for All-Pacific-10 Conference teams for the 1982 NCAA Division I-A football season.

== Offensive selections ==
=== Quarterbacks ===
- John Elway, Stanford (Coaches-1)
- Tom Ramsey, UCLA (Coaches-1)

=== Running backs ===
- Jacque Robinson, Washington (Coaches-1)
- Vincent White, Stanford (Coaches-1)
- Vance Johnson, Arizona (Coaches-1)
- Bryce Oglesby, Oregon St. (Coaches-2)
- Tim Harris, Washington St. (Coaches-2)
- Darryl Clack, Arizona St. (Coaches-2)

=== Wide receivers ===
- Cormac Carney, UCLA (Coaches-1)
- Paul Skansi, Washington (Coaches-1)
- Jo-Jo Townsell, UCLA (Coaches-2)
- Jeff Simmons, USC (Coaches-2)

=== Tight ends ===
- Chris Dressel, Stanford (Coaches-1)
- David Lewis, California (Coaches-2)

=== Tackles ===
- Don Mosebar, USC (Coaches-1)
- Harvey Salem, California (Coaches-1)
- Eric Moran, Washington (Coaches-2)
- Don Dow, Washington (Coaches-2)
- James Keyton, Arizona St. (Coaches-2)
- Chris Rose, Stanford (Coaches-2)

=== Guards ===
- Jeff Kiewel, Arizona (Coaches-1)
- Bruce Matthews, USC (Coaches-1)
- Ron Sowers, Arizona St. (Coaches-2)

=== Centers ===
- Tony Slaton, USC (Coaches-1)

== Defensive selections ==
=== Linemen ===
- George Achica, USC (Coaches-1)
- Jim Jeffcoat, Arizona St. (Coaches-1)
- Karl Morgan, UCLA (Coaches-1)
- Mike Walter, Oregon (Coaches-1)
- Ivan Lesnik, Arizona (Coaches-2)
- Ray Cattage, Washington (Coaches-2)
- Bryan Caldwell, Arizona St. (Coaches-2)
- Reggie Camp, California (Coaches-2)

=== Linebackers ===
- Ricky Hunley, Arizona (Coaches-1)
- Mark Stewart, Washington (Coaches-1)
- Vernon Maxwell, Arizona St. (Coaches-1)
- Jack Del Rio, USC (Coaches-1)
- Glenn Perkins, Arizona (Coaches-2)
- Riki Ellison, USC (Coaches-2)
- Ron Rivera, California (Coaches-2)
- Keith Browner, USC (Coaches-2)

=== Defensive backs ===
- Mike Richardson, Arizona St. (Coaches-1)
- Joey Browner, USC (Coaches-1)
- Vaughn Williams, Stanford (Coaches-1)
- Al Gross, Arizona (Coaches-1)
- Paul Moyer, Arizona St. (Coaches-2)
- Don Rogers, UCLA (Coaches-2)
- Ray Horton, Washington (Coaches-2)
- Lupe Sanchez, UCLA (Coaches-2)

== Special teams ==
=== Placekickers ===
- Chuck Nelson, Washington (Coaches-1)
- Luis Zendejas, Arizona St. (Coaches-2)

=== Punters ===
- Mike Black, Arizona St. (Coaches-1)
- Jeff Partridge, Washington (Coaches-2)

=== Return specialists ===
- Steve Brown, Oregon (Coaches-1)

== Key ==
Coaches = Pacific-10 head football coaches

== See also ==
- 1982 College Football All-America Team
