= 1982 Oregon Ducks football team =

American college football season

1982 Oregon Ducks football
- Conference: Pacific-10 Conference
- Record: 2–8–1 (2–6 Pac-10)
- Head coach: Rich Brooks (6th season)
- Offensive coordinator: Erik Widmark (3rd season)
- Captain: Michael Walter
- Home stadium: Autzen Stadium

1982 Pacific-10 Conference football standings
	Conf.					Overall
Team	W		L		T	W		L		T
No. 5 UCLA $	5	–	1	–	1	10	–	1	–	1
No. 7 Washington	6	–	2	–	0	10	–	2	–	0
No. 6 Arizona State	5	–	2	–	0	10	–	2	–	0
No. 15 USC	5	–	2	–	0	8	–	3	–	0
Arizona	4	–	3	–	1	6	–	4	–	1
California	4	–	4	–	0	7	–	4	–	0
Stanford	3	–	5	–	0	5	–	6	–	0
Washington State	2	–	4	–	1	3	–	7	–	1
Oregon	2	–	6	–	0	2	–	8	–	1
Oregon State	0	–	7	–	1	1	–	9	–	1
$ – Conference champion; Rankings from AP Poll

The 1982 Oregon Ducks football team represented the University of Oregon in the 1982 NCAA Division I-A football season. Playing as a member of the Pacific-10 Conference (Pac-10), the team was led by head coach Rich Brooks, in his sixth year, and played their home games at Autzen Stadium in Eugene, Oregon. They finished the season with a record of two wins, eight losses and one tie (2–8–1 overall, 2–6 in the Pac-10, ninth).

== Schedule ==
Date	Time	Opponent	Site	TV	Result	Attendance	Source
September 4	1:00 pm	No. 19 Arizona State	Autzen Stadium; Eugene, OR		L 3–34	23,127	
September 11	1:00 pm	San Jose State*	Autzen Stadium; Eugene, OR		L 13–18	17,629	
September 18	1:00 pm	Fresno State*	Autzen Stadium; Eugene, OR		L 4–10	20,856	
September 25	1:30 pm	at No. 1 Washington	Husky Stadium; Seattle, WA (rivalry)		L 21–37	58,742	
October 2	1:30 pm	at No. 16 USC	Los Angeles Memorial Coliseum; Los Angeles, CA (rivalry)		L 7–38	47,181	
October 16	1:04 pm	at California	California Memorial Stadium; Berkeley, CA		L 7–10	31,736	
October 23	1:00 pm	No. 15 Notre Dame*	Autzen Stadium; Eugene, OR	ESPN	T 13–13	40,381	
October 30	1:30 pm	at No. 11 UCLA	Rose Bowl; Pasadena, CA		L 12–40	40,808	
November 6	1:00 pm	Washington State	Autzen Stadium; Eugene, OR		L 3–10	20,178	
November 20	1:00 pm	Arizona	Autzen Stadium; Eugene, OR		W 13–7	16,489	
November 27	1:00 pm	at Oregon State	Parker Stadium; Corvallis, OR (Civil War)		W 7–6	36,000	
*Non-conference game; Rankings from AP Poll released prior to the game; All times are in Pacific time

== Game summaries ==
=== Oregon State ===
Team	1	2	3	4	Total
• Oregon	0	0	0	7	7
Oregon St	3	0	0	3	6

- Date: November 27
- Location: Parker Stadium

Scoring summary
Q1		ORST	Mangold 47 yard field goal	ORST 3–0
Q4		ORST	Mangold 32 yard field goal	ORST 6–0
Q4	2:30	ORE	Thomas 26 yard pass from Jorgensen (Lee kick)	ORE 7–6

== NFL draft ==
Two Ducks were selected in the 1983 NFL draft, which lasted 12 rounds (335 selections).

Player	Position	Round	Pick	NFL club
Mike Walter	Linebacker	2	50	Dallas Cowboys
Steve Brown	Defensive back	3	83	Houston Oilers
