= 1982 Oregon State Beavers football team =

American college football season

1982 Oregon State Beavers football
- Conference: Pacific-10 Conference
- Record: 1–9–1 (0–7–1 Pac-10)
- Head coach: Joe Avezzano (3rd season)
- Defensive coordinator: Ray Braun (4th season)
- Home stadium: Parker Stadium

1982 Pacific-10 Conference football standings
	Conf.					Overall
Team	W		L		T	W		L		T
No. 5 UCLA $	5	–	1	–	1	10	–	1	–	1
No. 7 Washington	6	–	2	–	0	10	–	2	–	0
No. 6 Arizona State	5	–	2	–	0	10	–	2	–	0
No. 15 USC	5	–	2	–	0	8	–	3	–	0
Arizona	4	–	3	–	1	6	–	4	–	1
California	4	–	4	–	0	7	–	4	–	0
Stanford	3	–	5	–	0	5	–	6	–	0
Washington State	2	–	4	–	1	3	–	7	–	1
Oregon	2	–	6	–	0	2	–	8	–	1
Oregon State	0	–	7	–	1	1	–	9	–	1
$ – Conference champion; Rankings from AP Poll

The 1982 Oregon State Beavers football team represented Oregon State University as a remember of Pacific-10 Conference (Pac-10) during the 1982 NCAA Division I-A football season. In their third season under head coach Joe Avezzano, the Beavers compiled an overall record of 1–9–1 record with a mark of 0–7–1 in conference playing, placing last in the Pac-10, and were outscored by their opponents, 306 to 134. The team played its home games at Parker Stadium in Corvallis, Oregon.

== Schedule ==
Date	Time	Opponent	Site	Result	Attendance	Source
September 11		at Arizona	Arizona Stadium; Tucson, AZ	L 12–38	35,599	
September 18	5:30 p.m.	at LSU*	Tiger Stadium; Baton Rouge, LA	L 7–45	78,425	
September 25	1:00 p.m.	San Jose State*	Parker Stadium; Corvallis, OR	L 13–17	22,000	
October 2	1:32 p.m.	at Stanford	Stanford Stadium; Stanford, CA	L 5–45	39,400–41,138	
October 9	1:00 p.m.	at Washington State	Martin Stadium; Pullman, WA	T 14–14	22,937	
October 16		No. 1 Washington	Parker Stadium; Corvallis, OR	L 17–34	38,000	
October 23		at No. 12 USC	Los Angeles Memorial Coliseum; Los Angeles, CA	L 0–38	50,035	
October 30	1:00 p.m.	California	Parker Stadium; Corvallis, OR	L 14–28	25,000	
November 6		at No. 4 Arizona State	Sun Devil Stadium; Tempe, AZ	L 16–30	62,316	
November 20		Montana*	Parker Stadium; Corvallis, OR	W 30–10	20,000	
November 27		Oregon	Parker Stadium; Corvallis, OR (Civil War)	L 6–7	36,000	
*Non-conference game; Rankings from AP Poll released prior to the game; All times are in Pacific time
