= 1982 USC Trojans football team =

American college football season

1982 USC Trojans football
- Conference: Pacific-10 Conference

Ranking
- AP: No. 15
- Record: 8–3 (5–2 Pac-10)
- Head coach: John Robinson (7th season)
- Offensive coordinator: Ted Tollner (1st season)
- Captains: George Achica; Joey Browner; Bruce Matthews
- Home stadium: Los Angeles Memorial Coliseum

1982 Pacific-10 Conference football standings
	Conf.					Overall
Team	W		L		T	W		L		T
No. 5 UCLA $	5	–	1	–	1	10	–	1	–	1
No. 7 Washington	6	–	2	–	0	10	–	2	–	0
No. 6 Arizona State	5	–	2	–	0	10	–	2	–	0
No. 15 USC	5	–	2	–	0	8	–	3	–	0
Arizona	4	–	3	–	1	6	–	4	–	1
California	4	–	4	–	0	7	–	4	–	0
Stanford	3	–	5	–	0	5	–	6	–	0
Washington State	2	–	4	–	1	3	–	7	–	1
Oregon	2	–	6	–	0	2	–	8	–	1
Oregon State	0	–	7	–	1	1	–	9	–	1
$ – Conference champion; Rankings from AP Poll

The 1982 USC Trojans football team represented the University of Southern California (USC) in the 1982 NCAA Division I-A football season. In their seventh year under head coach John Robinson, the Trojans compiled an 8–3 record (5–2 against conference opponents), finished in a tie for third place in the Pacific-10 Conference (Pac-10), and outscored their opponents by a combined total of 302 to 143. Due to probation, the Trojans were not eligible for postseason play.

Quarterback Sean Salisbury led the team in passing, completing 82 of 142 passes for 1,062 yards with six touchdowns and five interceptions. Todd Spencer led the team in rushing with 141 carries for 596 yards and eight touchdowns. Jeff Simmons led the team in receiving yards with 56 catches for 973 yards and five touchdowns.

== Schedule ==
Date	Time	Opponent	Rank	Site	TV	Result	Attendance	Source
September 11		at No. 11 Florida*	No. 10	Florida Field; Gainesville, FL	ABC	L 9–17	73,238	
September 18		Indiana*	No. 19	Los Angeles Memorial Coliseum; Los Angeles, CA		W 28–7	50,724	
September 25		at Oklahoma*	No. 18	Oklahoma Memorial Stadium; Norman, OK	ABC	W 12–0	76,758	
October 2		Oregon	No. 16	Los Angeles Memorial Coliseum; Los Angeles, CA		W 38–7	47,181	
October 16	12:48 p.m.	at Stanford	No. 14	Stanford Stadium; Stanford, CA (rivalry)	CBS	W 41–21	73,859–75,185	
October 23		Oregon State^{†}	No. 12	Los Angeles Memorial Coliseum; Los Angeles, CA		W 38–0	50,035	
October 30		at No. 7 Arizona State	No. 12	Sun Devil Stadium; Tempe, AZ		L 10–17	71,071	
November 6		California	No. 16	Los Angeles Memorial Coliseum; Los Angeles, CA		W 42–0	54,670	
November 13		at Arizona	No. 16	Arizona Stadium; Tucson, AZ		W 48–41	55,110	
November 20		at No. 11 UCLA	No. 15	Rose Bowl; Pasadena, CA (Victory Bell)	ABC	L 19–20	95,763	
November 27		Notre Dame*	No. 17	Los Angeles Memorial Coliseum; Los Angeles, CA (rivalry)	CBS	W 17–13	76,459	
*Non-conference game; ^{†}Homecoming; Rankings from AP Poll released prior to the game; All times are in Pacific time

== Game summaries ==
=== At Oklahoma ===
Team	1	2	3	4	Total
• USC	6	6	0	0	12
Oklahoma	0	0	0	0	0

- Date: September 25
- Location: Oklahoma Memorial Stadium • Norman, Oklahoma

Scoring summary
Q1	USC	Kamana 1 yard pass from Salisbury (kick failed)	USC 6–0
Q2	USC	Simmons 67 yard pass from White (pass failed)	USC 12–0

=== At Arizona ===
Team	1	2	3	4	Total
• USC	3	21	17	7	48
Arizona	10	10	7	14	41

- Date: November 13
- Location: Arizona Stadium, Tucson, Arizona
- Game attendance: 55,110

Scoring summary
Q1		USC	Jordan 42 yard field goal	USC 3–0
Q1		ARIZ	Boadway 32 yard interception return (Zendejas kick)	ARIZ 7–3
Q1		ARIZ	Zendejas 19 yard field goal	ARIZ 10–3
Q2		ARIZ	Zendejas 26 yard field goal	ARIZ 13–3
Q2		USC	Simmons 5 yard pass from Tinsley (Jordan kick)	ARIZ 13–10
Q2		ARIZ	Anderson 72 yard pass from Tunnicliffe (Zendejas kick)	ARIZ 20–10
Q2		USC	Simmons 36 yard pass from Tinsley (Jordan kick)	ARIZ 20–17
Q2		USC	Browner 53 yard interception return (Jordan kick)	USC 24–20
Q3		USC	White 33 yard pass from Tinsley (Jordan kick)	USC 31–20
Q3		USC	Jordan 25 yard field goal	USC 34–20
Q3		USC	West 27 yard interception return (Jordan kick)	USC 41–20
Q3		ARIZ	Edwards 2 yard run (Zendejas kick)	USC 41–27
Q4	9:22	ARIZ	Gobel 3 yard pass from Tunnicliffe (Zendejas kick)	USC 41–34
Q4	5:35	USC	Hopper 59 yard interception return (Jordan kick)	USC 48–34
Q4	3:38	ARIZ	Stivers 16 yard pass from Tunnicliffe (Zendejas kick)	USC 48–41

- USC Defense: 3 INTs for TD (NCAA record)

=== At UCLA ===
#15 USC Trojans at #11 UCLA Bruins

Quarter	1	2	3	4	Total
USC	3	7	0	9	19
UCLA	14	3	3	0	20

at Rose Bowl, Pasadena, California

- Date: November 20, 1982
- Game attendance: 95,736
- Gainesville Sun, 1982 Nov 21.

Game information

First quarter

- UCLA – Howell 9-yard pass from Tom Ramsey (John Lee kick). UCLA 7–0. Drive:
- USC – Steve Jordan 44-yard field goal. UCLA 7–3. Drive:
- UCLA – Danny Andrews 23-yard run (John Lee kick). UCLA 14–3. Drive:

Second quarter

- UCLA – John Lee 45-yard field goal. UCLA 17–3. Drive:
- USC – Todd Spencer 3-yard run (Steve Jordan kick). UCLA 17–10. Drive:

Third quarter

- UCLA – John Lee 42-yard field goal. UCLA 20–10. Drive:

Fourth quarter

- USC – Steve Jordan 21-yard field goal. UCLA 20–13. Drive:
- USC – Mark Boyer 1-yard pass from Scott Tinsley (run failed), 0:00. UCLA 20–19. Drive:

Top passers

- USC – Scott Tinsley – 14/23, 137 yards, TD, INT
- UCLA – Tom Ramsey – 11/24, 135 yards

Top rushers

- USC – Anthony Gibson – 30 rushes, 97 yards
- UCLA – Danny Andrews – 15 rushes, 78 yards, TD

Top receivers

- USC – Jeff Simmons – 4 receptions, 46 yards
- UCLA – Kevin Nelson – 2 receptions, 33 yards

=== Notre Dame ===
Team	1	2	3	4	Total
Notre Dame	7	3	3	0	13
• USC	0	3	7	7	17

- Date: November 27
- Location: Los Angeles Memorial Coliseum

Scoring summary
Q1		ND	Moriarty 2 yard run (Johnston kick)	ND 7–0
Q2		ND	Johnston ?? yard field goal	ND 10–0
Q2		USC	Jordan 35 yard field goal	ND 10–3
Q3		ND	Johnston 47 yard field goal	ND 13–3
Q3		USC	Harper 5 yard run (Jordan kick)	ND 13–10
Q4	0:48	USC	Harper 1 yard run (Jordan kick)	USC 17–14

== Roster ==
1982 USC Trojans football team roster
Players
Coaches
Offense

Pos.	#	Name	Class
QB		Jim Arrivey
TE		Mark Boyer
TE		Fred Cornwell
RB		Fred Crutcher
RB		Anthony Gibson
RB		Michael Harper
RB		Andrew Jackson
RB		John Kamana
RB		Zephrini Lee
OL	66	Bruce Matthews
TE		Pat McCool
OL	72	Don Mosebar
OL		Joe Murray
WR		Hank Norman
RB		Kennedy Pola
QB	7	Sean Salisbury
WR		Jeff Simmons
OL		Tony Slaton
RB		Todd Spencer
OL		Kelly Thomas
QB		Scott Tinsley
WR		Timmie Ware
WR		Timmy White

Defense

Pos.	#	Name	Class
DL		George Achica
DL		Duane Bickett
DB		Tony Brewer
LB		Jeff Brown
DB	47	Joey Browner
LB		Keith Browner
DL		August Curley
DL		Byron Darby
LB	52	Jack Del Rio
LB		Riki Gray
LB		Neil Hope
DB		Darrel Hopper
DB		Matt Johnson
DL		Matt Koart
DL		Brian Luft
LB		Tim Sullivan
DB		Troy West

Special teams

Pos.	#	Name	Class
K		Steve Jordan
P		Dave Pryor

Head coach

- John Robinson

Coordinators/assistant coaches

Legend

- (C) Team captain
- (S) Suspended
- (I) Ineligible
- Injured
- Redshirt
