= Kelly Phelps =

American football player

Kelly Phelps (born c. 1959) is a retired American football quarterback that played for the Oklahoma Sooners from 1978 to 1982. He led them to the 1983 Fiesta Bowl.
