= Terry Donahue =

American football player, coach, and executive (1944–2021)

Biographical details
- Born: June 24, 1944; Los Angeles, California, U.S.
- Died: July 4, 2021 (aged 77); Newport Beach, California, U.S.

Playing career
- 1965–1966: UCLA
- Position: Defensive tackle

Coaching career (HC unless noted)
- 1968–1970: Kansas (DL)
- 1971–1975: UCLA (OL)
- 1976–1995: UCLA

Administrative career (AD unless noted)
- 1999–2000: San Francisco 49ers (dir. player pers.)
- 2001–2005: San Francisco 49ers (GM)

Head coaching record
- Overall: 151–74–8
- Bowls: 8–4–1

Accomplishments and honors

Championships
- 5 Pac-10 (1982, 1983, 1985, 1987, 1993)

Awards
- 2× Pac-10 Coach of the Year (1985, 1993)
- College Football Hall of Fame; Inducted in 2000 (profile)

Terrence Michael Donahue (June 24, 1944 – July 4, 2021) was an American football coach and executive. He served as the head coach at the University of California, Los Angeles (UCLA) from 1976 to 1995, compiling a record of 151–74–8. His 151 wins are the most in UCLA Bruins history, and his 98 wins in the Pac-10 Conference—now known as the Pac-12 Conference—remain the most in the conference's history. Donahue's Bruins won five Pac-10 titles and appeared in four Rose Bowls, winning three. He became the first head coach to win a bowl game in seven consecutive seasons.

Donahue played college football for UCLA as an undersized defensive tackle. He left coaching after the 1995 season to become a college football color commentator. Donahue was inducted into the College Football Hall of Fame as a coach in 2000. From 2001 to 2005, he was the general manager for the San Francisco 49ers of the National Football League (NFL).

== Early life and playing career ==
Born in Los Angeles, Donahue attended St. Charles Borromeo Elementary School in North Hollywood, California, and graduated from Notre Dame High School in Sherman Oaks. After not being recruited in high school, he was a walk-on at San Jose State University, Los Angeles Valley College and then the University of California, Los Angeles. He played two seasons for the Bruins as an undersized 6-foot (1.8 m), 190-pound (86 kg) defensive tackle. His 1965 team was the school's first to win the Rose Bowl. They were nicknamed "Gutty Little Bruins" because nobody on the defensive line weighed more than 225 pounds (102 kg).

== Coaching career ==
After graduating from UCLA with a bachelor's degree in history, Donahue became an assistant coach at the University of Kansas under Pepper Rodgers. In 1971, he returned to UCLA when Rodgers became their head coach. When Rodgers left after 1973, Donahue remained as an assistant under Dick Vermeil and succeeded him in February 1976. In the season opener, the Bruins won a nationally televised Thursday night game over third-ranked Arizona State, and finished 9–2–1 in his first season. Sports Illustrated said Donahue, who was only in his early 30s, "may be the best young coach in the country." UCLA's best finish under Donahue was 10–1–1 in 1982, with his other ten-win seasons coming in 1987 and 1988 at 10–2.

In the final regular-season game of 1995, the Bruins defeated the USC Trojans, their fifth straight win against their crosstown rival. It was Donahue's 98th conference victory in the Pac-10, surpassing Don James for the most in the conference's history. Afterwards, Donahue announced that he would retire from coaching after their Aloha Bowl game to become a college football analyst with CBS. He has the most wins of any coach in UCLA football history (151). The Los Angeles Times attributed his coaching success to his being "a pioneer in national recruiting". His Bruins squads finished the season ranked in the top 20 on 12 occasions, including five times in the top 10 from 1982 though 1988, though he received some criticism for not winning a national championship. In his tenure as coach, the Bruins were ranked as high as No. 5 for a season, while being ranked No. 1 for two games (1988). He coached 34 first-team All-Americans, and 14 UCLA players from his era were chosen in the first round of the NFL draft.

Donahue's UCLA teams won four Pac-10 championships and tied for another while winning three Rose Bowls (1983, 1984, and 1986). He was the first person to participate in the Rose Bowl as a player, assistant coach and head coach. He compiled a record of 8–4–1 in bowl games and was the first coach to win a bowl game in seven consecutive seasons. The Bruins won four New Year's Day bowl games in a row from 1983 to 1986. However, they made just three bowl appearances in his last seven seasons, when their record was 43–35–1 after quarterback Troy Aikman graduated following the 1988 season. Donahue's record was 10–9–1 against USC. He was inducted into the College Football Hall of Fame in 2000. In 2015, Donahue lamented that he "quit too early" from UCLA; he had wanted the program to be more aggressive to pursue a national championship, but felt that unspecified differences with UCLA athletic officials hampered his effectiveness, prompting his departure.

In 1998, Donahue was offered an opportunity to coach in the NFL with the Dallas Cowboys. He would have re-united with Aikman. However, negotiations broke down with owner Jerry Jones, who instead hired Chan Gailey.

== Broadcasting and executive career ==
Donahue was the lead college football analyst for CBS Sports from 1996 to 1998. He left CBS to join the San Francisco 49ers front office in 1999. He was hand-picked by Bill Walsh to succeed him as general manager. During his first two years in San Francisco, Donahue served as Walsh's director of player personnel. When Walsh retired in 2001, Donahue was elevated to the general manager position, which he held for four seasons. In his first two seasons, the 49ers were 22–10 under coach Steve Mariucci. However, Mariucci was fired after the 2002 season following a 31–6 loss to Tampa Bay in a divisional playoff game. Dennis Erickson was hired as his replacement, but he went 9–23 in two seasons, including a franchise-worst 2–14 in 2004. San Francisco faced salary cap issues during that span, prompting the break up of their playoff-caliber roster, while their high draft picks did not pan out. Donahue and Erickson were fired in January 2005.

In 2006, Donahue became a game analyst for the NFL on Fox and worked on their Bowl Championship Series coverage as well. He served as an analyst on College Football Now on NFL Network. He was also an analyst for Dial Global.

Donahue helped found the California Showcase in 2013. The free annual one-day football combine provides high school seniors and junior college sophomores the opportunity to showcase their skills to college coaches from Division II, Division III and NAIA schools. He was also on the board of directors of the Lott IMPACT Trophy.

== Personal life ==
Donahue met his wife, Andrea, on a blind date during his first year as a graduate assistant at the University of Kansas and her junior year as an undergraduate. They married two weeks after her graduation in 1969. They had three daughters and ten grandchildren.

On July 4, 2021, Donahue died at his home in Newport Beach, California, following a two-year battle with cancer. He was 77.

== Awards and honors ==
- Rose Bowl Hall of Fame (1997)
- College Football Hall of Fame (2000)
- UCLA Athletics Hall of Fame (2001)
- Sun Bowl Hall of Fame (2005)
- UCLA Alumnus of the Year (2008)
- The press box at the Rose Bowl was dedicated as the Terry Donahue Pavilion in 2013.
- Honorary Lott Trophy (2016)

== Head coaching record ==
Year	Team	Overall	Conference	Standing	Bowl/playoffs	Coaches^{#}	AP^{°}
UCLA Bruins (Pacific-8/Pacific-10 Conference) (1976–1995)
1976	UCLA	9–2–1	6–1	2nd	L Liberty	15	15
1977	UCLA	7–4 (Note: UCLA later forfeited seven games, five of which were in conference, in 1977 due to an ineligible player. UCLA, the Pac-10, and the NCAA still credit Donahue with all on-field wins.)	5–2	T–2nd			
1978	UCLA	8–3–1	6–2	2nd	T Fiesta	12	14
1979	UCLA	5–6	3–4	7th			
1980	UCLA	9–2	5–2	2nd	(Note: UCLA was ineligible for post-season play in 1980 due to probation.)	14	13
1981	UCLA	7–4–1	5–2–1	T–4th	L Astro-Bluebonnet		
1982	UCLA	10–1–1	5–1–1	1st	W Rose	5	5
1983	UCLA	7–4–1	6–1–1	1st	W Rose	13	17
1984	UCLA	9–3	5–2	T–3rd	W Fiesta	10	9
1985	UCLA	9–2–1	6–2	1st	W Rose	6	7
1986	UCLA	8–3–1	5–2–1	T–2nd	W Freedom	14	14
1987	UCLA	10–2	7–1	T–1st	W Aloha	11	9
1988	UCLA	10–2	6–2	2nd	W Cotton	6	6
1989	UCLA	3–7–1	2–5–1	9th			
1990	UCLA	5–6	4–4	T–6th			
1991	UCLA	9–3	6–2	T–2nd	W John Hancock	18	19
1992	UCLA	6–5	3–5	8th			
1993	UCLA	8–4	6–2	T–1st	L Rose	17	18
1994	UCLA	5–6	3–5	T–5th			
1995	UCLA	7–5	4–4	T–5th	L Aloha		
UCLA:		151–74–8	98–51–5				
Total:		151–74–8					
National championship Conference title Conference division title or championship game berth
^{#}Rankings from final Coaches Poll.; ^{°}Rankings from final AP Poll.; Source:
