= 1982 Washington Huskies football team =

American college football season

1982 Washington Huskies football

Aloha Bowl, W 21–20 vs. Maryland
- Conference: Pacific-10 Conference

Ranking
- Coaches: No. 7
- AP: No. 7
- Record: 10–2 (6–2 Pac-10)
- Head coach: Don James (8th season)
- Offensive coordinator: Bob Stull (4th season)
- Defensive coordinator: Jim Lambright (5th season)
- MVP: Chuck Nelson
- Captains: Anthony Allen; Ken Driscoll; Paul Skansi; Mark Stewart
- Home stadium: Husky Stadium

1982 Pacific-10 Conference football standings
	Conf.					Overall
Team	W		L		T	W		L		T
No. 5 UCLA $	5	–	1	–	1	10	–	1	–	1
No. 7 Washington	6	–	2	–	0	10	–	2	–	0
No. 6 Arizona State	5	–	2	–	0	10	–	2	–	0
No. 15 USC	5	–	2	–	0	8	–	3	–	0
Arizona	4	–	3	–	1	6	–	4	–	1
California	4	–	4	–	0	7	–	4	–	0
Stanford	3	–	5	–	0	5	–	6	–	0
Washington State	2	–	4	–	1	3	–	7	–	1
Oregon	2	–	6	–	0	2	–	8	–	1
Oregon State	0	–	7	–	1	1	–	9	–	1
$ – Conference champion; Rankings from AP Poll

The 1982 Washington Huskies football team was an American football team that represented the University of Washington during the 1982 NCAA Division I-A football season. In its eighth season under head coach Don James, the team compiled a 10–2 record, finished second in the Pacific-10 Conference, defeated Maryland in the Aloha Bowl, and outscored its opponents 354 to 193.

Washington lost the Apple Cup for the first time in nine years, a four-point loss in Pullman which knocked the Huskies out of the Rose Bowl. With the win in the Aloha Bowl, Washington climbed to seventh in the final rankings.

Senior placekicker Chuck Nelson was selected as the team's most valuable player. Anthony Allen, Ken Driscoll, Paul Skansi, and Mark Stewart were the team captains.

== Schedule ==
Date	Time	Opponent	Rank	Site	Result	Attendance	Source
September 11		UTEP*	No. 2	Husky Stadium; Seattle, WA	W 55–0	53,966	
September 18		at Arizona	No. 1	Arizona Stadium; Tucson, AZ	W 23–13	48,984	
September 25		Oregon	No. 1	Husky Stadium; Seattle, WA (rivalry)	W 37–21	57,059	
October 2		San Diego State*	No. 1	Husky Stadium; Seattle, WA	W 46–25	55,528	
October 9	1:00 p.m.	California	No. 1	Husky Stadium; Seattle, WA	W 50–7	56,911	
October 16		at Oregon State	No. 1	Parker Stadium; Corvallis, OR	W 34–17	38,000	
October 23		Texas Tech*	No. 1	Husky Stadium; Seattle, WA	W 10–3	58,458	
October 30	12:50 p.m.	at Stanford	No. 2	Stanford Stadium; Stanford, CA	L 31–43	53,871–55,213	
November 6		No. 9 UCLA	No. 10	Husky Stadium; Seattle, WA	W 10–7	58,558	
November 13		at No. 3 Arizona State	No. 7	Sun Devil Stadium; Tempe, AZ	W 17–13	72,021	
November 20		at Washington State	No. 5	Martin Stadium; Pullman, WA (Apple Cup)	L 20–24	36,571	
December 25		vs. No. 16 Maryland*	No. 9	Aloha Stadium; Halawa, HI (Aloha Bowl)	W 21–20	30,055	
*Non-conference game; Rankings from AP Poll released prior to the game; All times are in Pacific time

== Game summaries ==
=== At Arizona State ===
Team	1	2	3	4	Total
• Washington	0	10	7	0	17
Arizona St	0	3	7	3	13

- Date: November 13
- Location: Sun Devil Stadium, Tempe, AZ
- Game attendance: 72,021

Scoring summary
Q1		WASH	Williams 20 yard pass from Cowan (Nelson kick)	WASH 7–0
Q1		WASH	Nelson 24 yard field goal	WASH 10–0
Q1	1:53	ASU	Zendejas 29 yard field goal	WASH 10–3
Q3		WASH	Robinson 4 yard run (Nelson kick)	WASH 17–3
Q3		ASU	Clack 50 yard run (Zendejas kick)	WASH 17–10
Q4		ASU	Zendejas 47 yard field goal	WASH 17–13

- Jacque Robinson - 34 rushes, 124 yards.

== NFL draft selections ==
Eleven University of Washington Huskies were selected in the 1983 NFL draft which lasted twelve rounds with 335 selections.

= Husky Hall of Fame

Player	Position	Round	Overall	Franchise
Ray Horton	DB	2	53	Cincinnati Bengals
Tony Caldwell	LB	3	82	Los Angeles Raiders
Chuck Nelson	PK	4	87	Los Angeles Rams
Vince Newsome	CB	4	97	Los Angeles Rams
Mark Stewart	LB	5	127	Minnesota Vikings
Paul Skansi	WR	5	133	Pittsburgh Steelers
Anthony Allen	WR	6	156	Atlanta Falcons
Bill Stapleton	DB	8	208	Detroit Lions
Eric Moran	T	10	273	Dallas Cowboys
Aaron Williams	WR	11	296	St. Louis Cardinals
Don Dow	T	12	317	Seattle Seahawks

== Roster ==
1982 Washington Huskies football team roster
Players
Coaches
Offense

Pos.	#	Name	Class
WR	15	Anthony Allen (C)	Sr
C	50	Paul Coty	Sr
QB	14	Tim Cowan	Sr
OT	77	Don Dow	Sr
WR	80	Danny Greene	So
FB	31	Chris James	Sr
G	56	Rick Mallory	Jr
OT	72	Eric Moran	Sr
QB	16	Steve Pelluer	Jr
RB	28	Jacque Robinson	So
WR	7	Paul Skansi (C)	Sr
WR	2	Aaron Williams	Sr
G	66	Pat Zakskorn	Sr

Defense

Pos.	#	Name	Class
MG	99	Dean Browning	Jr
LB	48	Tony Caldwell	Sr
DT	61	Ray Cattage	Sr
LB	40	Ken Driscoll (C)	Sr
LB	46	Stewart Hill	Jr
DT	90	Ron Holmes	So
CB	10	Ray Horton	Sr
CB	12	Ron Milus	Fr
WS	23	Vince Newsome	Sr
SS	30	Chris O'Connor	Sr
CB	11	Bill Stapleton	Sr
LB	38	Mark Stewart (C)	Sr

Special teams

Pos.	#	Name	Class
K	13	Chuck Nelson	Sr
P	18	Jeff Partridge	Sr

Head coach

- Don James (8th year)

Coordinators/assistant coaches

- Bob Stull – OC
- Jim Lambright – DC

Legend

- (C) Team captain
- (S) Suspended
- (I) Ineligible
- Injured
- Redshirt
