= Don Rogers (safety) =

American football player (1962–1986)

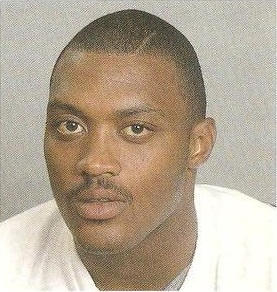
- Rogers in 1985

No. 20
- Position: Safety

Personal information
- Born: September 17, 1962; Texarkana, Arkansas, U.S.
- Died: June 27, 1986 (aged 23); Sacramento, California, U.S.
- Listed height: 6 ft 1 in (1.85 m)
- Listed weight: 206 lb (93 kg)

Career information
- High school: Norte Del Rio (Sacramento)
- College: UCLA
- NFL draft: 1984: 1st round, 18th overall pick

Career history
- Cleveland Browns (1984–1985)

Awards and highlights
- PFWA All-Rookie Team (1984); Consensus All-American (1983); First-team All-Pac-10 (1983); Second-team All-Pac-10 (1982)

Career NFL statistics
- Games played: 31
- Games started: 30
- Interceptions: 2
- Stats at Pro Football Reference

Donald Lavert Rogers (September 17, 1962 – June 27, 1986) was an American professional football player and safety in the National Football League (NFL) for two seasons during the mid-1980s. He died of a heart attack caused by cocaine use after his second season in the NFL.

== Early life ==
Rogers was born in Texarkana, Arkansas, and graduated from Norte Del Rio High School in Sacramento, California in 1980. He excelled in football, basketball and baseball, garnering All-City honors in all three sports. His brother Reggie Rogers also played in the NFL.

== College career ==
Rogers played college football for the UCLA Bruins, and, as a senior, was recognized as a consensus All-American.

Two of Rogers's most notable performances came in the Rose Bowl. In the 1983 game, as a junior, he was co-Player of the Game for UCLA, along with quarterback Tom Ramsey. The next year, he tied a Rose Bowl record when he intercepted two passes off of Illinois's quarterback, Jack Trudeau.

== Professional career ==
Rogers was selected in the first round with the 18th overall pick of the 1984 NFL draft by the Cleveland Browns. He played two seasons with the Browns from 1984 to 1985. He appeared in 31 regular season games, with two interceptions, one of which he returned 39 yards.

During Rogers' 1984 rookie season, he was named to the NFL All-Rookie Team and finished 2nd in voting for the NFL Defensive Rookie of the Year award.

In what would turn out to be his final game, a playoff loss to the Miami Dolphins, Rogers picked off hall-of-famer Dan Marino and returned the ball 45 yards.

== Death ==
Rogers died of a heart attack caused by a cocaine overdose on June 27, 1986, the day before his wedding. He was 23 years old. His death came only eight days after that of Len Bias, an NBA draft pick who also died of cocaine abuse, prompting a national discussion about the relationship between illegal drugs and athletes.

== See also ==
- List of gridiron football players who died during their careers

== Bibliography ==
- Harvey, Sean D. (2007). One Moment Changes Everything: The All-America Tragedy of Don Rogers. Sports Publishing, Inc. ISBN 978-1-59670-231-8.
