= Reggie Camp =

American football player (born 1961)

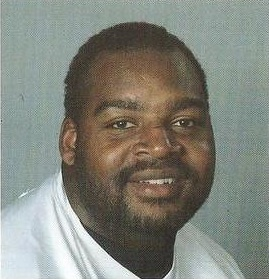

No. 96
- Position: Defensive end

Personal information
- Born: February 28, 1961 (age 65); San Francisco, California, U.S.
- Listed height: 6 ft 4 in (1.93 m)
- Listed weight: 274 lb (124 kg)

Career information
- High school: Jefferson Daly City, California
- College: California
- NFL draft: 1983: 3rd round, 68th overall pick

Career history
- Cleveland Browns (1983–1987); Atlanta Falcons (1988); Houston Oilers (1990)*
- * Offseason or practice squad member only

Awards and highlights
- Second-team All-Pac-10 (1982)

Career NFL statistics
- Sacks: 35
- Fumble recoveries: 2
- Stats at Pro Football Reference

Reginald Louis Camp (born February 28, 1961) is an American former professional football player who was a defensive end in the National Football League (NFL). He was selected by the Cleveland Browns in the third round of the 1983 NFL draft. He played college football for the California Golden Bears.

During his professional playing career, Camp was listed at 6-feet, 4-inches (1.93 m) and weighing 274 lbs (124 kg). He also played one season for the Atlanta Falcons in 1988. He had 35 sacks and 2 fumble recoveries in a six-year career. He is now the head coach of Bear Creek High School in Stockton, California.
