= 1982 Washington State Cougars football team =

American college football season

1982 Washington State Cougars football
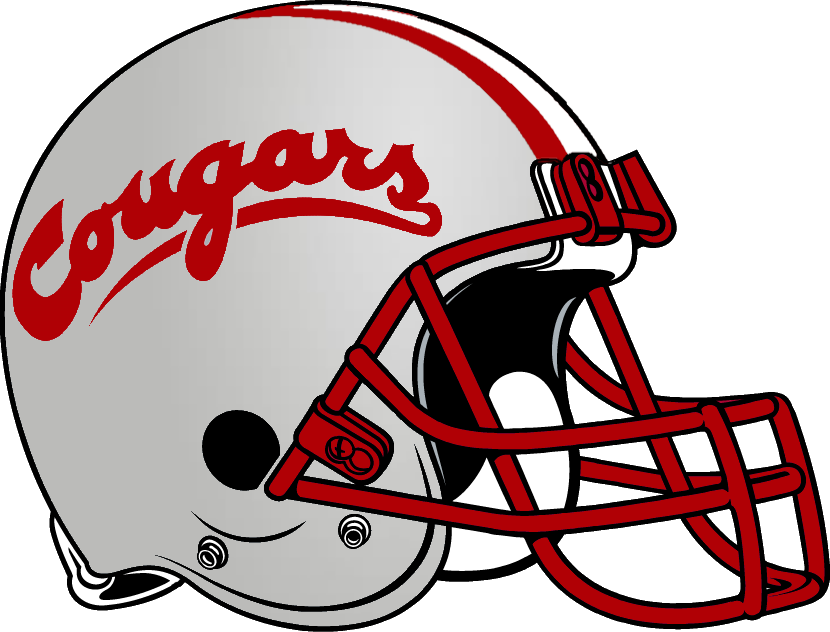
- Conference: Pacific-10 Conference
- Record: 3–7–1 (2–4–1 Pac-10)
- Head coach: Jim Walden (5th season)
- Home stadium: Martin Stadium; Joe Albi Stadium

1982 Pacific-10 Conference football standings
	Conf.					Overall
Team	W		L		T	W		L		T
No. 5 UCLA $	5	–	1	–	1	10	–	1	–	1
No. 7 Washington	6	–	2	–	0	10	–	2	–	0
No. 6 Arizona State	5	–	2	–	0	10	–	2	–	0
No. 15 USC	5	–	2	–	0	8	–	3	–	0
Arizona	4	–	3	–	1	6	–	4	–	1
California	4	–	4	–	0	7	–	4	–	0
Stanford	3	–	5	–	0	5	–	6	–	0
Washington State	2	–	4	–	1	3	–	7	–	1
Oregon	2	–	6	–	0	2	–	8	–	1
Oregon State	0	–	7	–	1	1	–	9	–	1
$ – Conference champion; Rankings from AP Poll

The 1982 Washington State Cougars football team was an American football team that represented Washington State University in the Pacific-10 Conference (Pac-10) during the 1982 NCAA Division I-A football season. In their fifth season under head coach Jim Walden, the Cougars compiled a 3–7–1 record (2–4–1 in Pac-10, eighth), and were outscored 255 to 170.

The team's statistical leaders included Clete Casper with 1,070 passing yards, Tim Harris with 684 rushing yards, and Mike Peterson with 440 receiving yards.

The Cougars played two home games at Joe Albi Stadium in Spokane and four on campus at Martin Stadium in Pullman; WSU did not play USC and Arizona State this season, and met neighbor Idaho for the first time in four years in the opener at Spokane.

The finale was the Apple Cup, held in Pullman for the first time in 28 years; With two wins in ten games, WSU was an 18-point home underdog and were down by ten points at the half. They took the lead in the third quarter and upset the fifth-ranked Washington Huskies, 24–20. It was the Cougars' first win over the Huskies in nine years.

== Schedule ==
Date	Time	Opponent	Site	Result	Attendance	Source
September 11		Idaho*	Joe Albi Stadium; Spokane, WA (Battle of the Palouse)	W 34–14	25,321	
September 18		Colorado*	Joe Albi Stadium; Spokane, WA	L 0–12	30,923	
September 25		at Minnesota*	Hubert H. Humphrey Metrodome; Minneapolis, MN	L 11–41	50,653	
October 2		at Tennessee*	Neyland Stadium; Knoxville, TN	L 3–10	91,744	
October 9	1:00 p.m.	Oregon State	Martin Stadium; Pullman, WA	T 14–14	22,937	
October 16		at No. 12 UCLA	Rose Bowl; Pasadena, CA	L 17–42	41,732	
October 23	1:02 p.m.	Stanford^{†}	Martin Stadium; Pullman, WA	L 26–31	26,806	
October 30		Arizona	Martin Stadium; Pullman, WA	L 17–34	27,412	
November 6		at Oregon	Autzen Stadium; Eugene, OR	W 10–3	20,178	
November 13	1:01 p.m.	at California	California Memorial Stadium; Berkeley, CA	L 14–34	34,060	
November 20		No. 5 Washington	Martin Stadium; Pullman, WA (Apple Cup)	W 24–20	36,571	
*Non-conference game; ^{†}Homecoming; Rankings from AP Poll released prior to the game; All times are in Pacific time

== Game summaries ==
=== Washington ===
Team	1	2	3	4	Total
Washington	7	10	3	0	20
• Washington State	0	7	14	3	24

- Date: November 20
- Location: Martin Stadium, Pullman, WA

Scoring summary
1	WASH	Allen 24 yard pass from Cowan (Nelson kick)	WASH 7-0
2	WASH	Nelson 21 yard field goal	WASH 10-0
2	WSU	Matthews 3 yard run (Traut kick)	WASH 10-7
2	WASH	Allen 16 yard pass from Cowan (Nelson kick)	WASH 17-7
3	WSU	Peterson 6 yard pass from Casper (Traut kick)	WASH 17-14
3	WSU	Harris 7 yard run (Traut kick)	WSU 21-17
3	WASH	Nelson 37 yard field goal	WSU 21-20
4	WSU	Traut 37 yard field goal	WSU 24-20

== Roster ==
1982 Washington State Cougars football team roster
Players
Coaches
Offense

Pos.	#	Name	Class
SE		Roger Bolden	Sr
SE		Mark Walser	Fr
SE	80	John Breland	So
QB	9	Clete Casper	Sr
OT	77	Mike Dreyer	Fr
OT	60	Charlie Flager	Sr
RB	43	Tim Harris	Sr
SE	85	T.J. Jones	Sr
TE	92	Vince Leighton	So
G	58	Dan Lynch	Jr
RB	32	James Matthews	Sr
RB	36	Rueben Mayes	Fr
G	63	Gary Patrick	Sr
SE	87	Mike Peterson	Sr
QB	17	Mark Rypien	So
C	51	Steve Sebahar	Sr
OT	72	Kevin Sloan	Jr
TE	80	Tom Spencer	Sr
SE		Lawrence Taylor	Jr
QB	12	Ricky Turner	Jr
OT	74	John Winslow	Jr

Defense

Pos.	#	Name	Class
LB	97	Mike Beasley	So
LB	96	Lee Blakeney	Jr
CB	30	Mark Blocker	Sr
LB	91	Ben Carrillo	So
LB	94	Brad Harrington	So
FS	28	Steve Haub	So
NG	79	Milford Hodge	So
LB	45	Wade Killian	So
NG	65	Pat Lynch	Jr
DT	93	Keith Millard	Jr
NG	18	Mark Pleis	Sr
CB	19	Rod Retherford	Sr
SS	3	Joe Taylor	Sr
LB	54	Junior Tupuola	Jr
SS	2	Jerald Waters	So
LB	57	Brent White	Sr
DT	76	Eric Williams	Jr

Special teams

Pos.	#	Name	Class
P	1	Glenn Harper	Fr
K	4	John Traut	Fr
KR	36	Rueben Mayes	Fr

Head coach

- Jim Walden (5th year)

Coordinators/assistant coaches

- Jim Burrow (DB)
- Dave Elliott (ILB)
- Jon Fabris
- Gary Gagnon
- Lindsay Hughes
- Steve Morton
- Mel Sanders
- Harold Wheeler
- Del Wight
- Ken Woody

Legend

- (C) Team captain
- (S) Suspended
- (I) Ineligible
- Injured
- Redshirt

== NFL draft ==
Two Cougars were selected in the 1983 NFL draft.

Player	Position	Round	Overall	Franchise
Steve Sebahar	C	11	285	Philadelphia Eagles
Clete Casper	QB	12	311	Los Angeles Rams
