= John Lee (placekicker) =

American football player (born 1964)

No. 10
- Position: Placekicker

Personal information
- Born: May 19, 1964 (age 62); Seoul, South Korea
- Listed height: 5 ft 11 in (1.80 m)
- Listed weight: 182 lb (83 kg)

Career information
- High school: Downey (Los Angeles, California, U.S.)
- College: UCLA
- NFL draft: 1986: 2nd round, 32nd overall pick

Career history
- St. Louis Cardinals (1986); Los Angeles Raiders (1988)*
- * Offseason or practice squad member only

Awards and highlights
- PFWA All-Rookie Team (1986); Unanimous All-American (1985); First-team All-American (1984); 2× First-team All-Pac-10 (1984, 1985)

Career NFL statistics
- Field goal attempts: 13
- Field goals made: 8
- Field goal %: 61.5
- Stats at Pro Football Reference

- John Lee
- Hangul: 이민종
- RR: I Minjong
- MR: I Minjong

John Lee (Korean: 이민종; born May 19, 1964) is a South Korean former player of American football who was a placekicker for the St. Louis Cardinals of the National Football League (NFL). He played college football for the UCLA Bruins, twice earning All-American honors, including a unanimous selection in 1985. Lee was selected by St. Louis in the second round of the 1986 NFL draft. He played one season with the Cardinals and was the first South Korean to play in the NFL. He was inducted into the UCLA Athletics Hall of Fame in 2001.

== Early life ==
Lee was born in South Korea where he primarily played baseball, even playing in the Little World Series regional qualifying tournament. His family moved to the United States when he was in the sixth grade. He began playing football as a freshman at Downey High School and studied kicking under the tutelage of Ben Agajanian. It was on Agajanian's recommendation that UCLA signed Lee to an athletic scholarship.

== NCAA records held or tied ==
- Broke the Pacific-10 Conference single game field goal record (since matched by two others) with six made against the San Diego State Aztecs in 1984.
- Holds the highest percentage of extra points and field goals made in a career with 93.3% (116 of 117 PATs, 79 of 92 FGs).
- Most field goals made per game for a season (2.6, 1984, 29 in 11 games) and in a career (1.84, 79 in 43 games)
- Highest percentage of field goals made in a season (100%, 1984, 16 out of 16) and in a career (minimum 55 attempts) (85.9%, 79 out of 92)
- Highest percentage of field goals made under 40 yards in a season (minimum 16 made) (100%, 1984, 16 out of 16) and in a career (minimum 40 made) (96.4%, 54 of 56)
- Most times kicking four field goals in a game in a career (six times)
- Most games in which field goal provided the winning margin in a career (ten times)

== Rose Bowl record ==
Lee played in the 1983, 1984 and 1986 Rose Bowl, and was an integral part of the success of the UCLA Bruins during his college career, as evidenced by his conference-leading accuracy and the 10 games won by the margin of a field goal. He holds the Rose Bowl career record of 24 most scoring points made by kicking, 1983 UCLA vs. Michigan (3 PAT, 1 FG), 1984 UCLA vs. Illinois (6 PAT, 1 FG) and 1986 UCLA vs. Iowa (6 PAT, 1 FG). The 15 total PAT points in three games also is a record and the 6 PAT-points in each of the two games ranks second in Rose Bowl history.

== Professional career ==
=== St. Louis Cardinals ===
Lee was selected by the St. Louis Cardinals in the second round (32nd overall) of the 1986 NFL draft, making him one of the highest placekickers ever drafted and the first East Asia native to play in the NFL. On July 27 Lee agreed to a four-year $900,000 contract, making him the highest paid player at his position in the league. The contract for a player observers expected to be a "sure-fire" star included a $250,000 signing bonus.

Although Lee made his first six kicks in preseason, he unexpectedly suffered through a slump and began missing field goals. Coach Gene Stallings was understanding of Lee's field goal slump, but was less understanding of the short distances of his kickoffs. Lee never had to kick off in college, with its larger rosters, but found it difficult to adjust to kicking off without a kicking tee (at the time, the NFL did not allow the use of tees on kickoffs). He was unable to get adequate distance on his kickoffs, which angered Stallings; as Stallings later put it, "my gosh, his leg." His kickoffs were too short that they cost the Cardinals valuable field position. The combination of short kickoffs, missed field goals and criticism by Stallings cost Lee his confidence. Lee made eight of 13 field goals as a rookie, before undergoing arthroscopic surgery on his right knee and missing the last five regular season games. Lee was waived on September 8, 1987.

=== Los Angeles Raiders ===
In 1988, Lee was signed as a free agent by the Los Angeles Raiders to compete with incumbent kicker Chris Bahr, who struggled in 1987. He was waived on August 22, after missing 2 out of 3 field goals in preseason.

== Personal life ==
After leaving the NFL after one season, Lee helped run his family's real estate business in Guam, including retail business, gas stations, and restaurants.
