= Paul Skansi =

American football player, coach, and scout (born 1961)

Personal information
- Born: January 11, 1961 (age 65); Tacoma, Washington, U.S.
- Listed height: 5 ft 11 in (1.80 m)
- Listed weight: 186 lb (84 kg)

Career information
- Position: Wide receiver (No. 81, 82)
- High school: Peninsula (Purdy, Washington)
- College: Washington (1979–1982)
- NFL draft: 1983: 5th round, 133rd overall pick

Career history

Playing
- Pittsburgh Steelers (1983); Seattle Seahawks (1984–1991); Ottawa Rough Riders (1992)

Coaching
- Washington Huskies (1994); Assistant wide receivers coach; Idaho Vandals (1995–1998); Wide receivers coach; Nevada Wolf Pack (1999); Wide receivers coach

Operations
- San Diego Chargers (2000–2015) Scout; Washington Redskins / Football Team / Commanders (2017–2025) Scout

Awards and highlights
- First-team All-Pac-10 (1982); Second-team All-Pac-10 (1981)

Career NFL statistics
- Receptions: 166
- Receiving yards: 1,950
- Touchdowns: 10
- Stats at Pro Football Reference

Paul Anthony Skansi (born January 11, 1961) is an American former professional football player and scout. A former wide receiver, he played college football for the Washington Huskies and was drafted by the Pittsburgh Steelers in the fifth round of the 1983 NFL draft. Skansi played the majority of his NFL career with the Seattle Seahawks before playing a final season with the Ottawa Rough Riders in 1992. He served as an assistant college football coach in the 1990s before becoming a scout with the San Diego Chargers in 2000. Skansi also worked as a scout for the Washington Commanders before retiring in 2026.

== Early life ==
Born in Tacoma, Washington, Skansi attended Peninsula High School in Gig Harbor. After watching him play in a high school basketball game, coach Don James of the UW Huskies offered him a football scholarship.

== Career ==
Skansi was a leading receiver for the Washington Huskies football team, setting the Husky record for passes received during his four years of play from 1979 to 1982. He was selected in the fifth round of the 1983 NFL draft by the Pittsburgh Steelers, playing there for one season before joining the Seattle Seahawks the following year. His most successful season was 1989, when he caught 39 passes for 488 yards and five touchdowns. Over his career, he caught 166 passes for 1,950 yards and ten touchdowns. He caught the tying 25-yard touchdown pass from quarterback Dave Krieg in the final second of a 1990 game against the Kansas City Chiefs at Arrowhead Stadium.

Skansi was an assistant coach for the Idaho Vandals and Nevada Wolf Pack throughout most of the 1990s. He worked as a scout for the San Diego Chargers from 2000 to 2015 and the Washington Redskins / Commanders from 2017 to 2026.
