= 1982 Arizona Wildcats football team =

American college football season

1982 Arizona Wildcats football
- Conference: Pacific-10 Conference
- Record: 6–4–1 (4–3–1 Pac-10)
- Head coach: Larry Smith (3rd season)
- Offensive coordinator: Steve Axman (3rd season)
- Defensive coordinator: Moe Ankney (3rd season)
- Home stadium: Arizona Stadium

1982 Pacific-10 Conference football standings
| | Conf. | | | | | Overall |
| Team | W | | L | | T | W | | L | | T |
|---|---|---|---|---|---|---|---|---|---|---|
| No. 5 UCLA $ | 5 | – | 1 | – | 1 | 10 | – | 1 | – | 1 |
| No. 7 Washington | 6 | – | 2 | – | 0 | 10 | – | 2 | – | 0 |
| No. 6 Arizona State | 5 | – | 2 | – | 0 | 10 | – | 2 | – | 0 |
| No. 15 USC | 5 | – | 2 | – | 0 | 8 | – | 3 | – | 0 |
| Arizona | 4 | – | 3 | – | 1 | 6 | – | 4 | – | 1 |
| California | 4 | – | 4 | – | 0 | 7 | – | 4 | – | 0 |
| Stanford | 3 | – | 5 | – | 0 | 5 | – | 6 | – | 0 |
| Washington State | 2 | – | 4 | – | 1 | 3 | – | 7 | – | 1 |
| Oregon | 2 | – | 6 | – | 0 | 2 | – | 8 | – | 1 |
| Oregon State | 0 | – | 7 | – | 1 | 1 | – | 9 | – | 1 |
$ – Conference champion; Rankings from AP Poll

The 1982 Arizona Wildcats football team represented the University of Arizona in the Pacific-10 Conference (Pac-10) during the 1982 NCAA Division I-A football season. In their third season under head coach Larry Smith, the Wildcats compiled a 6–4–1 record (4–3–1 against Pac-10 opponents), finished in fifth place in the Pac-10, and outscored their opponents, 311 to 219. The team played its home games in Arizona Stadium in Tucson, Arizona. Despite being bowl-eligible with a winning record, the Wildcats did not appear in a bowl game, as they self-imposed a postseason ban due to NCAA violations prior to Smith becoming coach in 1980 (see below).

Memorable highlights of the season included a big road win at Notre Dame and a huge upset of rival Arizona State which denied ASU a chance to potentially play in the Rose Bowl.

The team's statistical leaders included Tom Tunnicliffe with 2,520 passing yards, Vance Johnson with 443 rushing yards, and Brad Anderson with 870 receiving yards. Linebacker Ricky Hunley led the team with 173 total tackles.

== Before the season ==
Arizona completed the 1981 season with a 6–5 record, highlighted by a huge road upset victory over USC. The Wildcats entered 1982 with high hopes that they were contenders for the Pac-10 title, with fans crediting Smith for rebuilding the program.

However, despite Smith rebuilding the team, the Wildcats have been embroiled in a scandal that happened in the late 1970s under Smith's predecessor Tony Mason. Both the NCAA and the Pac-10 investigated and determined that Arizona operated a slush fund which involved Mason allegedly paying players cash, which turned out to be fraud, and the Wildcats were put on probation as a result. As NCAA sanctions were soon to be handed out, Arizona decided to self-impose a postseason ban for the 1982 season as punishment, which meant that they would become ineligible for the Pac-10 title and Rose Bowl appearance. The NCAA would eventually penalize the Wildcats as a result of the scandal and put them on probation, as well as handing the team bowl bans in 1983 and 1984, respectively.

== Schedule ==
| Date | Time | Opponent | Site | TV | Result | Attendance | Source |
|---|---|---|---|---|---|---|---|
| September 11 | 7:00 p.m. | Oregon State | Arizona Stadium; Tucson, AZ | KZAZ | W 38–12 | 35,599 | |
| September 18 | 6:00 p.m. | No. 1 Washington | Arizona Stadium; Tucson, AZ | CBS | L 13–23 | 48,984 | |
| September 25 | 7:30 p.m. | Iowa* | Arizona Stadium; Tucson, AZ | ESPN | L 14–17 | 41,353 | |
| October 9 | 1:00 p.m. | at No. 8 UCLA | Rose Bowl; Pasadena, CA | ABC | T 24–24 | 50,133 | |
| October 16 | 11:30 a.m. | at No. 9 Notre Dame* | Notre Dame Stadium; Notre Dame, IN | ESPN | W 16–13 | 59,075 | |
| October 23 | 7:30 p.m. | Pacific (CA)* | Arizona Stadium; Tucson, AZ | KZAZ | W 55–7 | 45,800 | |
| October 30 | 2:00 p.m. | at Washington State | Martin Stadium; Pullman, WA | | W 34–17 | 27,417 | |
| November 6 | 2:05 p.m. | at Stanford | Stanford Stadium; Stanford, CA | USA | W 41–27 | 41,789 | |
| November 13 | 6:30 p.m. | No. 16 USC^{†} | Arizona Stadium; Tucson, AZ | ESPN | L 41–48 | 55,110 | |
| November 20 | 2:00 p.m. | at Oregon | Autzen Stadium; Eugene, OR | | L 7–13 | 16,489 | |
| November 27 | 7:00 p.m. | No. 6 Arizona State | Arizona Stadium; Tucson, AZ (rivalry) | USA | W 28–18 | 58,515 | |
*Non-conference game; ^{†}Homecoming; Rankings from AP Poll released prior to the game; All times are in Mountain time

== Game summaries ==
=== Washington ===
After a dominant season-opening victory against Oregon State, Arizona hosted Washington, who was ranked first at the time. The Wildcats would play tough, but it became difficult for the Arizona offense to score points against a top-ranked opponent like the Huskies, and Arizona ultimately came up short. The loss prevented the Wildcats from upsetting a number-one-ranked team for a second straight season (Arizona defeated USC the previous year). It would be another ten years before Arizona finally got an upset victory over a top-ranked Washington squad at home.

=== Iowa ===
Iowa at Arizona

| Team | 1 | 2 | 3 | 4 | Total |
|---|---|---|---|---|---|
| • Hawkeyes | 0 | 7 | 7 | 3 | 17 |
| Wildcats | 0 | 14 | 0 | 0 | 14 |

- Date: September 26
- Location: Arizona Stadium • Tucson, Arizona
- Elapsed time: 2:35
- Game attendance: 41,353
- Game weather: 90 °F (32 °C), Partly cloudy, Wind 6 mph (9.7 km/h)

Scoring summary
| 2 | 11:12 | ARIZ | Keel 6-yard pass from Tom Tunnicliffe (Zendejas kick) | ARIZ 7–0 |
| 2 | 8:54 | IOWA | Love-Jordan 9-yard pass from Chuck Long (Nichol kick) | Tie 7–7 |
| 2 | 1:55 | ARIZ | Griffin-3 yard run (Zendejas kick) | ARIZ 14–7 |
| 3 | 7:34 | IOWA | Moritz 14 yard pass from Long (Nichol kick) | Tie 14–14 |
| 4 | 2:20 | IOWA | Nichol 20 yard field goal | IOWA 17–14 |

Arizona faced Iowa at home. The Wildcats defeated the Hawkeyes on the road in coach Smith's first season in 1980. A late Iowa field goal in the fourth quarter decided the game, and led to an Arizona loss.

=== UCLA ===
Arizona visited UCLA and played at the Rose Bowl for the first time ever (UCLA began playing home games here this season after decades playing at the Los Angeles Memorial Coliseum, sharing with USC). Both the Wildcats and Bruins fought tough and the game ultimately ended in a tie. The Bruins would go on to win the Pac-10 and play in the Rose Bowl at home.

=== Notre Dame ===
Arizona at Notre Dame

| Team | 1 | 2 | 3 | 4 | Total |
|---|---|---|---|---|---|
| • Wildcats | 0 | 0 | 6 | 10 | 16 |
| Fighting Irish | 10 | 0 | 0 | 3 | 13 |

- Date: October 16
- Location: Notre Dame Stadium • South Bend, Indiana
- Game attendance: 59,075

Scoring summary
| Q1 | | ND | Johnson 22 yard field goal | ND 3–0 |
| Q1 | | ND | Pinkett 25 yard run (Johnson kick) | ND 10–0 |
| Q3 | | Ariz | Zendejas 38 yard field goal | ND 10–3 |
| Q3 | | Ariz | Zendejas 32 yard field goal | ND 10–6 |
| Q4 | | ND | Johnson 43 yard field goal | ND 13–6 |
| Q4 | | Ariz | Freeman 1 yard run (Zendejas kick) | 13–13 |
| Q4 | 0:00 | Ariz | Zendejas 48 yard field goal | Arizona 16–13 |

On the road at Notre Dame, the Wildcats and Irish battled back and forth and the game came down to the last play. With the score tied, Arizona got into Irish territory. Kicker Max Zendejas kicked a 48-yard field goal as time expired to win the game, and Smith and the Wildcats earned yet another win over a top-10 ranked team (Notre Dame was ranked ninth), as well as defeating the Irish for the first and only time in school history. It also avenged Arizona's loss to Notre Dame in Smith's first season in 1980. To date, this remains the last time that both Arizona and Notre Dame would meet on the football field, and given the parity between two schools, it is highly unlikely that they will play each other again unless they meet in a bowl game in the near future.

Similar to the 1981 win over USC, fans greeted the Wildcats with celebrations at the Tucson airport when they returned home hours after the game concluded.

=== USC ===
USC at Arizona

| Team | 1 | 2 | 3 | 4 | Total |
|---|---|---|---|---|---|
| • Trojans | 3 | 21 | 17 | 7 | 48 |
| Wildcats | 10 | 10 | 7 | 14 | 41 |

- Date: November 13
- Location: Arizona Stadium, Tucson, Arizona
- Game attendance: 55,110

Scoring summary
| Q1 | | USC | Jordan 42 yard field goal | USC 3–0 |
| Q1 | | ARIZ | Boadway 32 yard interception return (Zendejas kick) | ARIZ 7–3 |
| Q1 | | ARIZ | Zendejas 19 yard field goal | ARIZ 10–3 |
| Q2 | | ARIZ | Zendejas 26 yard field goal | ARIZ 13–3 |
| Q2 | | USC | Simmons 5 yard pass from Tinsley (Jordan kick) | ARIZ 13–10 |
| Q2 | | ARIZ | Anderson 72 yard pass from Tunnicliffe (Zendejas kick) | ARIZ 20–10 |
| Q2 | | USC | Simmons 36 yard pass from Tinsley (Jordan kick) | ARIZ 20–17 |
| Q2 | | USC | Browner 53 yard interception return (Jordan kick) | USC 24–20 |
| Q3 | | USC | White 33 yard pass from Tinsley (Jordan kick) | USC 31–20 |
| Q3 | | USC | Jordan 25 yard field goal | USC 34–20 |
| Q3 | | USC | West 27 yard interception return (Jordan kick) | USC 41–20 |
| Q3 | | ARIZ | Edwards 2 yard run (Zendejas kick) | USC 41–27 |
| Q4 | 9:22 | ARIZ | Gobel 3 yard pass from Tunnicliffe (Zendejas kick) | USC 41–34 |
| Q4 | 5:35 | USC | Hopper 59 yard interception return (Jordan kick) | USC 48–34 |
| Q4 | 3:38 | ARIZ | Stivers 16 yard pass from Tunnicliffe (Zendejas kick) | USC 48–41 |

On homecoming weekend, the Wildcats hosted USC. Arizona had upset the Trojans in the previous year and were looking to make it two wins in a row against them. However, USC capitalized on the Wildcats’ mistakes throughout the game, including returning three interceptions for touchdowns, which set an NCAA record, and Arizona never recovered afterwards, despite rallying in the fourth quarter and ultimately coming up short as the Trojans held on for the win. Smith blamed the loss on Arizona being blitzed by USC, which led to the turnovers and USC avenging their loss to the Wildcats the year before.

=== Arizona State ===
To conclude the season, Arizona hosted the rivalry game against Arizona State, who were ranked sixth and was near the top of the Pac-10 standings with a possible Rose Bowl berth on the line and the Wildcats looking to spoil ASU's chances of that happening (ASU needed a win against Arizona to punch their ticket to Pasadena).

As Arizona State was favored to win and was expected to continue its dominance over Arizona in the rivalry, many Wildcat fans theorized that Tucson was becoming more friendly towards ASU in terms of relevance, given that ASU was the state's top football team at the time and having not lost at Arizona Stadium since 1974 (Arizona State won big in Smith's first year in 1980). In addition, Arizona lost to ASU in the previous year and Smith referred to the Sun Devils as the “big brother” to the Wildcats due to ASU dominating the rivalry, making Arizona the “little brother” team and ASU fans trolling Smith leading up to the game, though Smith seemed confident that Arizona can compete with the Devils for a chanCe at an upset win. With bowl-eligibility being out of the picture for Arizona, Smith referred to the game as the Wildcats’ bowl game in an attempt to salvage the season.

In the game itself, Arizona would blitz ASU all night, and the Wildcat defense recorded a pair of safeties and the offense came up big by connecting on two long touchdown passes to help the Wildcats upset Arizona State and deny the Sun Devils a trip to the Rose Bowl. It was the Wildcats' first win over ASU at home since 1974 and the victory also began a reign of dominance against the Devils after being dominated by ASU throughout most of the previous two decades. After the game, fans rushed the field and tore down the Arizona Stadium goal posts by celebrating the Wildcats knocking their rivals out of the Rose Bowl for good (UCLA went on to receive the bid).

Smith said during the postgame that the win put the Wildcats back on top and climbed them out of ASU's shadow in the rivalry that lasted for decades, a reference to remarks that he made about ASU in 1980.

The win gave Arizona a sixth win of the year and became bowl-eligible. However, the Wildcats had already self-imposed a bowl ban prior to the start of the season and that they were ineligible for the postseason as a result.

== Awards and honors ==
- Ricky Hunley, LB, Consensus and AP All-American, First-team All-Pac-10

== Season notes ==
- Prior to the start of the season, the scoreboard on Arizona Stadium's north side was upgraded with a more computerized look. The scoreboard would last until the end of the 1992 season.
- Arizona began the year with games against two consecutive conference opponents, both at home, which became a rare achievement for the Wildcats.
- The Wildcats started a string of dominance over Arizona State this season, and went on to a 8–0–1 record against them, which was known as "The Streak" to fans, which lasted until 1991. This dominance lasted for the rest of Smith's tenure with the Wildcats, as he would not lose to ASU again, and it continued during the era under Smith's successor Dick Tomey that lasted through the 1990s.
- After defeating Notre Dame, the Wildcats and Fighting Irish have not met on the football field since. Arizona claimed that they couldn't afford scheduling non-conference games against tradition-rich powerhouse schools like Notre Dame due to it being too expensive for Arizona's athletic budget and a small market like Tucson. However, things would change in the future, as Arizona would play several big opponents and would often compete with them in most of the game until they either won or lost.
- The Wildcats played at the Rose Bowl for the first time in its history (by playing a conference game against UCLA and not the actual bowl game itself, in which they have yet to appear in as of today).
- This was the third consecutive season in which Smith's Wildcats defeated a top ten opponent (UCLA in 1980, USC in 1981, and Notre Dame and Arizona State in 1982), and the only one to date where they won at least twice against the ranked teams. Arizona did tie UCLA, who was then ranked eighth.
- Arizona wore their white road jerseys in its final three home games against Pacific (won), USC (lost), and ASU (won), as they wore their blue ones at home earlier in the season. Smith said that they wore white due to them in the wake of the Wildcats’ tie against UCLA and their big win over Notre Dame, and that he believed that the team played mediocre in blue in the earlier home games and wanted to “white out” the remaining home opponents for better luck (the Wildcats joined LSU at the time as one of the few college teams that wore white at home). The NCAA forced a rule that teams were required to wear colored jerseys at home beginning in the 1983 season. ASU, who wore their maroon home jerseys against Arizona, would not wear their home jerseys in Tucson again until 2020. Arizona would not wear white jerseys for a home game again until 2014.
- By winning several games on the road during the season, Smith, as well as fans, referred to the team as “road warriors” (a reference to the 1981 film Mad Max 2: The Road Warrior that was released in America earlier in the year). The team's kicker, Max Zendejas, was often known as the team's true “road warrior” and “Mad Max” after kicking the winning field goal against Notre Dame, as Zendejas’ first name shared the same name of the film's protagonist, though the film was a sequel the 1979 film Mad Max. The tie against UCLA and the loss at Oregon were the only two road games that the Wildcats failed to win all season.
- After the victory over ASU, many Wildcat players and fans claimed to have found roses that were either destroyed or tossed in trash cans around Arizona Stadium left behind by ASU fans. This was due to ASU needing a win over the Wildcats to clinch a Rose Bowl berth, and Arizona winning that prevented their rival from accomplishing that goal.
- Days after Arizona's upset of ASU, the Arizona Daily Wildcat (the university's newspaper), published an article of the game and featured a fan-made picture of Wilbur the Wildcat (Arizona's mascot) defeating its ASU counterpart (Sparky the Sun Devil) with Wilbur standing in victory raising a helmet and carrying a football, while Sparky was lying on the ground covered in blood in defeat along with Sparky's pitchfork split in two (implied to be broken by Wilbur) and pieces of roses scattered across the Arizona desert, referencing the Wildcats’ win over the Sun Devils.
- Despite the Wildcats winning six games during the season, they did not play in the postseason due to them self-imposing a bowl ban as a result of an NCAA investigation of fraud within the program (see above). Arizona was worried about losing bowl-eligibility due to the scandal and that they would be soon penalized, which led to the self-imposed ban.
- Fans have believed that the 1982 season began a resurgence that turned the Wildcats into contenders despite a tough schedule, and made headlines as a result. One article was posted at the end of the season about Arizona's successful season while referencing memorable films released during the year, such as “drawing First Blood” after scoring first against opponents, “having E.T.” in the Arizona Stadium crowd to cheer them”, a “Road Warrior making a clutch kick” to win against Notre Dame, “haunted by Poltergeists” after losses, and “going the distance like Rocky” after wins.
- Arizona played all of its home games at night and all road games in the daytime, something that had never happened before in modern history for the program, though the Wildcats also played their home games in the evening during the 1981 season.

== After the season ==
With the Wildcats finishing the season on a high note, the victory over ASU in the finale would become the turning point for the program under coach Smith, as he would build the team into contenders for the Pac-10 title through the middle part of the decade and restore Arizona's tradition of winning. As Arizona was ineligible for bowl games in 1983–84, they would continue to improve and Smith would finally lead them to a bowl in 1985.

As the football team was returning to their winning ways, many fans have speculated that their interest in football affected Arizona's basketball program, which led to losses, low attendance, and lack of popularity for that team. However, as the decade progressed, both programs (as well as Arizona's baseball team) would become a force in the Pac-10 by both winning and recruiting that would last through most of the 1990s, and would energize the university.

== Personnel ==
1982 Arizona Wildcats football team roster
Players
Coaches
Offense

| Pos. | # | Name | Class |
|---|---|---|---|
| TE | 83 | Mark Keel | Sr |
| QB | | Tom Tunnicliffe |

Defense

| Pos. | # | Name | Class |
|---|---|---|---|
| LB | 46 | John Kaiser | Jr |

Special teams

| Pos. | # | Name | Class |
|---|---|---|---|
| K | 13 | Max Zendejas | Fr |

Head coach

- Larry Smith

Coordinators/assistant coaches

- Tom Roggeman

Legend

- (C) Team captain
- (S) Suspended
- (I) Ineligible
- Injured
- Redshirt
