= Chris Dressel =

American football player (born 1961)

No. 88, 82, 84, 47
- Position: Tight end

Personal information
- Born: February 7, 1961 (age 65); Placentia, California, U.S.
- Listed height: 6 ft 4 in (1.93 m)
- Listed weight: 230 lb (104 kg)

Career information
- High school: El Dorado (Placentia)
- College: Stanford
- NFL draft: 1983: 3rd round, 69th overall pick

Career history
- Houston Oilers (1983–1986); Washington Redskins (1987)*; San Francisco 49ers (1987); Cleveland Browns (1988)*; Kansas City Chiefs (1989); New York Jets (1989-1991); Miami Dolphins (1992)*; San Francisco 49ers (1992)
- * Offseason or practice squad member only

Awards and highlights
- Third-team All-American (1982); First-team All-Pac-10 (1982)

Career NFL statistics
- Receptions: 111
- Receiving yards: 1,098
- Touchdowns: 8
- Stats at Pro Football Reference

Christopher John Dressel (born February 7, 1961) is an American former professional football player who was a tight end and h-back in the National Football League (NFL).

Born and raised in Placentia, California, Dressel played scholastically at El Dorado High School. He played collegiately for the Stanford Cardinal, where, as a senior, he was honored by the Gannett News Service as a third-team All-American.

Dressel was selected 69th overall by the Houston Oilers in the third-round of the 1983 NFL draft, and started 30 of 32 games his first two years. He was with Houston for two more years, again appearing in all 32 games, but with no starts. In 1987 he played in one game for the San Francisco 49ers as a replacement player during the NFLPA strike. He was out of the NFL completely in 1988.

In 1989 Dressel resurrected his career, initially with the Kansas City Chiefs for seven games, then with the New York Jets for the last eight games of the season. During the 1990 and 1991 seasons with the Jets he appeared in 15 games each year, starting a total of 10 of them. He finished his career back with the 49ers for one game in 1992.

Dressel recorded 111 pass receptions for 1098 yards and 8 touchdowns during his 9 years in the NFL.

After his football career, Dressel pursued a real estate career in San Francisco.
