= Scott Tinsley (American football coach) =

American football coach (1963/1964–2026)

Biographical details
- Born: 1963 or 1964
- Died: February 17, 2026 (aged 62)

Playing career
- 1981–1982: Appalachian State
- Position: Quarterback

Coaching career (HC unless noted)
- 1983–1988: Appalachian State (assistant)
- 1989: West Virginia Tech (assistant)
- 1990–1991: West Virginia State (assistant)
- 1992–1994: West Virginia State
- 1995–2007: Nitro HS (WV)
- 2008–2011: West Virginia Tech
- 2014–2015: Hurricane HS (WV) (volunteer assistant)
- 2016–2017: Saint Albans HS (WV)

Head coaching record
- Overall: 17–56 (college)

Scott Tinsley (1963 or 1964 – February 17, 2026) was an American football coach. He served as head football coach at West Virginia State University in Institute, West Virginia, from 1992 through 1994 and at West Virginia University Institute of Technology from 2008 to 2011, compiling a career college football coaching record of 17–56.

After a successful 13-year stint as the head football coach at Nitro High School, Tinsley was named head football coach at West Virginia Tech in Montgomery, West Virginia. He served there from 2008 through the 2011 season, when the program was discontinued. His coaching record at West Virginia Tech was 6–37.

Tinsley died on February 17, 2026, at the age of 62.

== Head coaching record ==
=== College ===
Year	Team	Overall	Conference	Standing	Bowl/playoffs
West Virginia State Yellow Jackets (West Virginia Intercollegiate Athletic Conference) (1992–1994)
1992	West Virginia State	6–4	4–3	4th	
1993	West Virginia State	1–9	1–6	7th	
1994	West Virginia State	4–6	2–5	8th	
West Virginia State:		11–19	7–14		
West Virginia Tech Golden Bears (Mid-South Conference) (2008–2011)
2008	West Virginia Tech	0–11	0–6	7th (East)	
2009	West Virginia Tech	3–8	0–6	7th (East)	
2010	West Virginia Tech	2–9	1–5	6th (East)	
2011	West Virginia Tech	1–9	0–6	7th (East)	
West Virginia Tech:		6–37	1–23		
Total:		17–56			
