= Harvey Salem =

American football player (born 1961)

No. 73, 74, 72
- Position: Offensive tackle

Personal information
- Born: January 15, 1961 (age 65); Berkeley, California, U.S.
- Listed height: 6 ft 6 in (1.98 m)
- Listed weight: 283 lb (128 kg)

Career information
- High school: El Cerrito (CA)
- College: California
- NFL draft: 1983: 2nd round, 30th overall pick

Career history
- Houston Oilers (1983–1986); Detroit Lions (1986–1990); Denver Broncos (1991); Green Bay Packers (1992)

Awards and highlights
- PFWA All-Rookie Team (1983); Second-team All-American (1982); Third-team All-American (1981); 2× First-team All-Pac-10 (1981, 1982)

Career NFL statistics
- Games Played: 126
- Games Started: 107
- Fumble recoveries: 1
- Stats at Pro Football Reference

Harvey Maynard Salem (born January 15, 1961) is an American former professional football player who was an offensive tackle who played 10 seasons in the National Football League (NFL). He played college football for the California Golden Bears.
