= Brian Ransom (gridiron football) =

American gridiron football player (born 1960)

No. 6
- Position: Quarterback

Personal information
- Born: July 9, 1960 (age 66); Omaha, Nebraska, U.S.
- Listed height: 6 ft 3 in (1.91 m)
- Listed weight: 205 lb (93 kg)

Career information
- High school: North (Nashville, Tennessee)
- College: Tennessee State (1979–1982)
- NFL draft: 1983: undrafted

Career history
- Dallas Cowboys (1983)*; Houston Oilers (1983–1985); Montreal Alouettes (1986)
- * Offseason or practice squad member only

Brian Anthony Ransom (born July 9, 1960) is an American former professional football quarterback who played one season with the Montreal Alouettes of the Canadian Football League (CFL). Ransom played college football at Tennessee State University. He was also a member of the Houston Oilers of the National Football League (NFL), but saw no playing time.

== Early life and college ==
Brian Anthony Ransom was born on July 9, 1960, in Omaha, Nebraska. He attended North High School in Nashville, Tennessee and graduated in 1979. He was inducted into the Metropolitan Nashville Public Schools Sports Hall of Fame in 2011.

Ransom was a four-year letterman for the Tennessee State Tigers of Tennessee State University from 1979 to 1982. He was named an All-American by both the "Sheridan Poll" and The Sporting News in 1981.

== Professional career ==
After going undrafted in the 1983 NFL draft, Ransom signed with the Dallas Cowboys on April 28. He was released on August 29, 1983.

Ransom was signed by the Houston Oilers on September 29, 1983. He was later waived on August 27, 1985. He was recalled from waivers on September 4, 1985, after backup quarterback Oliver Luck broke a bone in his left foot during the Oilers' final preseason game. Ransom was waived again on September 11, 1985. He did not play in any regular season games during his time with the Oilers.

Ransom dressed in all 18 games for the Montreal Alouettes of the Canadian Football League (CFL) in 1986, completing 247 of 494 passes (50.0%) for 3,204 yards, nine touchdowns, and 25 interceptions while also rushing 37 times for 141 yards and two touchdowns. He also fumbled nine times, losing seven of them. The Alouettes finished the season with a 4–14 record.
