= Jeff Simmons (American football) =

American football player (born 1960)

No. 89
- Position: Wide receiver

Personal information
- Born: July 6, 1960 (age 66); Stockton, California, U.S.
- Listed height: 6 ft 3 in (1.91 m)
- Listed weight: 195 lb (88 kg)

Career information
- High school: Edison (Stockton)
- College: USC
- NFL draft: 1983: 7th round, 171st overall pick

Career history
- Los Angeles Rams (1983); Los Angeles Raiders (1984)*
- * Offseason or practice squad member only

Awards and highlights
- Second-team All-Pac-10 (1982)
- Stats at Pro Football Reference

Jeffrey Thomas Simmons (born July 6, 1960) is an American former professional football player who was a wide receiver for the Los Angeles Rams of the National Football League (NFL). He played college football for the USC Trojans. He was selected by the Los Angeles Rams in the 7th round (171st overall) of the 1983 NFL Draft.
