= Todd Hons =

American gridiron football player (born 1961)

No. 1, 18
- Position: Quarterback

Personal information
- Born: September 5, 1961 (age 65); Torrance, California, U.S.
- Listed height: 6 ft 1 in (1.85 m)
- Listed weight: 195 lb (88 kg)

Career information
- High school: West (Torrance)
- College: Arizona State
- NFL draft: 1984: undrafted

Career history
- Winnipeg Blue Bombers (1984)*; Detroit Lions (1987); Detroit Drive (1988)
- * Offseason or practice squad member only

Awards and highlights
- ArenaBowl champion (1988)

Career NFL statistics
- Passing attempts: 92
- Passing completions: 43
- Completion percentage: 46.7%
- TD–INT: 5–5
- Passing yards: 552
- Passer rating: 61.5
- Stats at Pro Football Reference

Todd Hank Hons (born September 5, 1961) is an American former professional football player who was a quarterback in the National Football League (NFL) and Arena Football League (AFL). He played for the Detroit Lions and Detroit Drive. He played college football for the Arizona State Sun Devils.
