= Tom Ramsey =

American football player (born 1961)

No. 14, 15, 12
- Position: Quarterback

Personal information
- Born: July 9, 1961 (age 65); Encino, California, U.S.
- Listed height: 6 ft 1 in (1.85 m)
- Listed weight: 189 lb (86 kg)

Career information
- High school: John F. Kennedy (Los Angeles, California)
- College: UCLA
- NFL draft: 1983: 10th round, 267th overall pick

Career history
- Los Angeles Express (1983–1984); Oakland Invaders (1984); New England Patriots (1984–1988); Indianapolis Colts (1989)

Awards and highlights
- Second-team All-American (1982); Pac-10 Co-Player of the Year (1982); First-team All-Pac-10 (1982); UCLA Hall of Fame (1998); Rose Bowl Hall of Fame (2007)

Career NFL statistics
- Passing attempts: 214
- Passing completions: 108
- Completion percentage: 50.5%
- TD–INT: 7–10
- Passing yards: 1,285
- Passer rating: 60.6
- Stats at Pro Football Reference

Tom Ramsey (born July 9, 1961) is an American former professional football player who was a quarterback for six seasons in the National Football League (NFL) for the New England Patriots and Indianapolis Colts. He was selected by the Patriots in the 10th round (267th overall) of the 1983 NFL draft. He began his professional career with the Los Angeles Express and the Oakland Invaders of the United States Football League (USFL). He played college football for the UCLA Bruins

Ramsey graduated from Kennedy High School in Granada Hills, California, in 1979. When Ramsey was quarterback for Kennedy, the quarterback at rival high school Granada Hills was John Elway.

At the University of California, Los Angeles, he played an outstanding Rose Bowl game in 1983 and was awarded the game MVP along with Don Rogers. In 1998, Ramsey was inducted into the UCLA Athletics Hall of Fame, and in 2007, Ramsey was inducted into the Rose Bowl Hall of Fame. He is also an analyst for college football on ESPN and for college and NFL football on ESPN Radio.

Ramsey was the last quarterback of the New England Patriots to wear jersey #12 prior to Tom Brady.

== See also ==
- List of NCAA major college football yearly passing leaders
