= 1986 Rose Bowl =

American college football game

- 72nd Rose Bowl Game
UCLA Bruins	Iowa Hawkeyes
(8–2–1)	(10–1)
45	28
Head coach: Terry Donahue	Head coach: Hayden Fry
AP / Coaches; 13 / 13	AP / Coaches; 4 / 3
	1	2	3	4	Total
UCLA	10	14	7	14	45
Iowa	7	3	7	11	28
- Date: January 1, 1986
- Season: 1985
- Stadium: Rose Bowl
- MVP: Eric Ball (UCLA RB)
- Favorite: Iowa by 4½ points
- National anthem: UCLA Solid Gold; Sound Band
- Referee: Tom Quinn (Big Ten; split crew: Big Ten, Pac-10)
- Halftime show: UCLA Band and Hawkeye Marching Band
- Attendance: 103,292

United States TV coverage
- Network: NBC
- Announcers: Dick Enberg, Merlin Olsen
- Nielsen ratings: 22.7

The 1986 Rose Bowl was a college football bowl game played on January 1, 1986. It was the 72nd edition and was held at the Rose Bowl in Pasadena, California. The UCLA Bruins upset the Iowa Hawkeyes 45–28. UCLA tailback Eric Ball was named the Player Of The Game. He ran for a Rose Bowl record four touchdowns.

== Pre-game activities ==
On Tuesday, October 22, 1985, the Rose Queen selection ceremony took place at Tournament House in Pasadena when 17-year-old Aimee Lynn Richelieu, a senior at San Marino High School and a resident of San Marino, California, was named the 68th Rose Queen to reign over the 97th Rose Parade and the 72nd Rose Bowl Game. On Thursday, October 24, the Coronation occurred at the Wrigley Mansion, when the 1985–86 Tournament of Roses President, Frederick D. Johnson, Jr., placed the Queen's Crown on Miss Richelieu's head and a dozen roses in her arms to start her year-long reign.

The game was presided over by the 1986 Tournament of Roses Royal Court and Rose Parade Grand Marshal Erma Bombeck. Members of the court are: Princesses Shannon Guernsey, Altadena; Christine Huff, Altadena; April Lake, Arcadia; Tracey Langford, Pasadena; Julene Penner, Pasadena; and Loreen Weeks, Sierra Madre.

== Teams ==
See also 1985 NCAA Division I-A football season

The 1986 Rose Bowl matched the winners of the Big Ten Conference and the Pacific-10 Conference. Each conference had tie-breaker rules in place should there be conference co-champions.

=== Iowa ===
Iowa spent most of the season ranked in the top five, and five weeks ranked number one in the nation. On October 19, 1985, they defeated the #2 Michigan Wolverines 12–10 in the thirteenth regular season matchup between a #1 and #2 team, and the first in the Big Ten conference. Mike Haight, Chuck Long, and Ronnie Harmon were the stars for the Hawkeyes. They eventually lost one game, on November 2 to Ohio State, 13–22. Iowa came into the 1986 Rose bowl game with a record of 10–1.

After much consideration, Chuck Long delighted Iowa Hawkeye fans by declaring that he would return for his senior season. The rest of the 1984 team returning off a win in the 1984 Freedom Bowl also vowed to return. Long became an instant Heisman Trophy candidate, and Iowa was a pre-season top five team. On September 28, the Hawkeyes crushed the in-state rival Iowa State Cyclones 57-3. In the October 1, 1985, poll, the Hawkeyes ascended to #1 in the national rankings.

In Iowa's first game at #1, the Hawkeyes played Michigan State. A seesaw game had the Spartans leading 31–28 in the waning minutes. Long drove Iowa the length of the field, and the Hawkeyes faced fourth and goal from the two-yard line with just 27 seconds remaining. Since there was no overtime rule until 1996, Iowa needed to go for the touchdown and the win. Long faked a handoff to running back Harmon and then ran to his right. His fake had fooled the Spartan defenders, and Long ran into the endzone, holding the ball high above his head as he crossed the goal line to give Iowa a 35–31 victory. He completed a school record 30 passes on 39 attempts for 380 yards and scored five touchdowns (four passing and the game winning score rushing) in the game.

Two weeks later, #1 Iowa faced #2 Michigan in Kinnick Stadium. Iowa trailed 10-9 as the Hawkeyes regained possession of the football at their own 22-yard line with just 5:27 remaining in the game. Long led Iowa on a 66-yard drive against the nation's top-ranked defense, twice converting third-and-eight situations by completing passes to tight end Mike Flagg. Long drove the Iowa team to the 12-yard line with two seconds remaining to set up kicker Rob Houghtlin's game-winning field goal as time expired. Long completed 26 of 39 passes for 297 yards in Iowa's 12–10 win.

Their only loss, at Ohio State in early November, cost Iowa the #1 ranking, but the Hawkeyes still won the Big Ten title outright for the first time in 27 years. Long won many major national awards as a senior, including the 1985 Maxwell Award, given to the nation's top player and the Davey O'Brien Award, given to the nation's top quarterback. He was the Big Ten Player of the Year and a consensus first team All-American. Finally, Long was the runner-up in the balloting for the Heisman Trophy to Bo Jackson of Auburn in the closest margin to date, losing by just 45 points. Larry Station was a first team all-American.

=== UCLA ===
UCLA defeated defending national champion BYU 27–24 in Provo to start the season, and tied eventual SEC and Sugar Bowl champion Tennessee. The Bruins opened the Pac-10 season by losing 21–14 at Washington. They later got two key wins, the first against Arizona State, the second at Arizona. For much of the season, the rushing defense was ranked second in the nation, behind Oklahoma. They won the rest of their games leading to the 1985 USC vs UCLA game.

Needing a win against 4–5 USC, UCLA struggled. Gaston Green and Mel Farr Jr. had fumbles in the game. UCLA was leading in the fourth quarter 13–10 when Eric Ball fumbled at the USC 1 as he was about to score what would have been the clinching touchdown. Freshman quarterback Rodney Peete led USC on a drive, converting a key fourth down along the way. In the last two minutes, USC again faced a fourth down, this time at UCLA's 2-yard line. USC scored to take a 17–13 lead, then intercepted UCLA quarterback David Norrie as he tried to lead a Bruin comeback. UCLA's loss opened the door for Washington to grab the Rose Bowl berth, but they were upset by Washington State the same day, 21–20. Washington lost the advantage due to their upset home loss to Oregon State. This put Arizona State in position to win the conference as they entered their rivalry game with Arizona with only one conference loss (40–17 to UCLA). But later that evening, Arizona defeated Arizona State 16–13 to cause a tie between UCLA, Arizona State, and Arizona. UCLA won the tiebreaker and the Rose Bowl berth by virtue of its wins over Arizona and Arizona State.

UCLA came into New Year's with a record of 8–2–1, and head coach Terry Donahue had been named Pac-10 Coach of the year. Five Bruin players were first team All-Pac-10: defensive tackle Mark Walen, offensive tackle Mike Hartmeier, kicker John Lee, nose guard Terry Tumey, and inside linebacker Tommy Taylor. Walen was named Pac-10 defensive player of the year. UCLA finished ranked #1 in the nation in rushing defense, at 70.3 yards per game. Oklahoma was second with 89.9 yards per game.

== Game summary ==
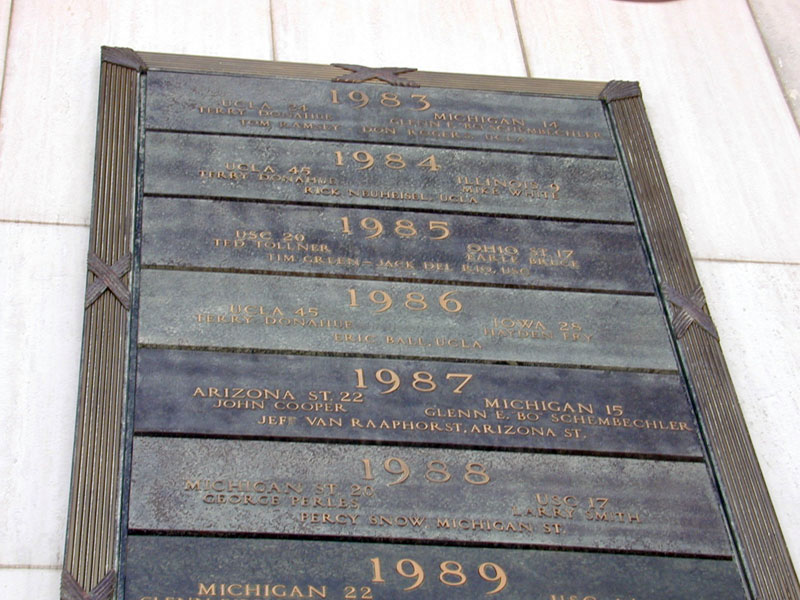
Rose Bowl records at the Hall of Champions

The weather was overcast and 71 °F (22 °C). The UCLA Bruins wore white visitor jerseys, and the Iowa Hawkeyes wore their black home jerseys. Both teams wore Rose Bowl patches on their uniforms. The Iowa Hawkeye helmets bore a sticker with the letters "ANF" for "America Needs Farmers". Coach Hayden Fry had the players wear these stickers to bring attention the plight of American farmers.

- Humorist Erma Bombeck was the grand marshal for the 97th Tournament of Roses Parade that morning. The parade theme was "A Celebration of Laughter."
- Tournament of Roses President Lathrop K. "Lay" Leishman presided over the coin toss. Iowa won the toss and deferred to UCLA.
- Entering the game, Fry was tied with Forest Evashevski in all-time wins as an Iowa head coach.
- Iowa recovered a fumble at the UCLA 5 from a bad snap of a UCLA punt on the first series of downs. In the first play from scrimmage, Iowa quarterback Chuck Long gave the ball to Ronnie Harmon, who fumbled the ball and UCLA recovered.
- Iowa running back Ronnie Harmon fumbled the ball a total of four times, and later dropped a pass while wide open in the end zone as Iowa attempted a late comeback. He had only fumbled one time in the regular season.
- Hawkeye quarterback Chuck Long was sacked four times. A loophole with the redshirting rule allowed Long to play in his fifth bowl game. He is believed to be the only collegiate player to participate in five bowl games.
- Iowa placekicker Rob Houghtlin tied a Rose Bowl record with a 52-yard field goal in the fourth quarter. This tied a record set by Ohio State's Rich Spangler the previous year. This record stood until 2018, when Rodrigo Blankenship kicked a 55-yard field goal.
- Eric Ball, a freshman tailback for UCLA, ran for 227 yards and tied a modern Rose Bowl record by scoring four rushing touchdowns. Sam Cunningham ran for four touchdowns for national champion USC in the 1973 edition. Eric was in for the injured Gaston Green, who had started, but pulled a hamstring. This record has been tied by Ron Dayne in the 1999 Rose Bowl and Vince Young in the 2006 Rose Bowl. In the 1902 Rose Bowl, Neil Snow of Michigan had scored five rushing touchdowns. This record stood until the 2017 Rose Bowl.
- Matt Stevens was the UCLA quarterback. After sharing the starting quarterback job with David Norrie for the first half of the season, he eventually lost the starter's job after playing poorly at Washington in a loss in the Bruins' Pac-10 opening game. Stevens did not find out he was starting until a few minutes before the game, when Norrie could not play due to an injury.

=== Scoring ===
==== First quarter ====
- Iowa — David Hudson, 1-yard run (Rob Houghtlin kick). (Iowa, 7–0)
- UCLA — Eric Ball, 30-yard run. (John Lee kick) (7–7)
- UCLA — Lee, 42-yard field goal (UCLA, 10–7)

==== Second quarter ====
- Iowa — Houghtlin, 24-yard field goal (10–10)
- UCLA — Ball, 40-yard run (Lee kick) (UCLA, 17–10)
- UCLA — Ball, 6-yard run (Lee kick) (UCLA, 24–10)

==== Third quarter ====
- Iowa — Chuck Long 4-yard run (Houghtlin kick) (UCLA, 24–17)
- UCLA — Mike Sherrard, 6-yard pass from Matt Stevens (Lee kick) (UCLA, 31–17)

==== Fourth quarter ====
- UCLA — Ball, 32-yard run (Lee kick) (UCLA, 38–17)
- Iowa — Houghtlin, 52-yard field goal (UCLA, 38–20)
- UCLA — Stevens, 1-yard run (Lee kick) (UCLA, 45–20)
- Iowa — Bill Happel, 11-yard pass from Long (Harmon run) (UCLA, 45–28)

Houghtlin tied the record for longest field goal made in the Rose Bowl.

=== Statistics ===
Team stats	UCLA	Iowa
First downs	29	25
Net yards rushing	299	82
Net yards passing	189	319
Total yards	488	401
PC–PA–Int.	16–26–1	29–38–1
Punts–Avg.	2–38.5	2–32.5
Fumbles–Lost	3–2	4–4
Penalties–Yards	6–36	5–40

== Aftermath ==
=== Final polls ===
Iowa missed an outside shot at the final #1 ranking, with #2 Miami losing to Tennessee 35–7 in the Sugar Bowl and #3 Oklahoma defeating #1 Penn State 25–10 in the Orange Bowl. Oklahoma had leapfrogged Iowa on December 10 in the poll. Michigan finished at #2 after their Fiesta Bowl win, the highest final poll ranking ever achieved by Michigan coach Bo Schembechler. The Hawkeyes finished at #10 in the AP poll #9 in the coaches poll. The UCLA Bruins finished at #7 in the AP poll and #6 in the coaches poll, their highest ranking of the season.

=== Television ratings ===
This game had a 22.7 television ratings share. Through 2007, only the 1987 Fiesta Bowl game has a higher U.S. television rating at 24.9. Only the 1988 Orange Bowl at a 20.8 and the 2006 Rose Bowl at a 21.7 have over a 20 share since the 1986 Rose Bowl.

=== Chuck Long ===
Though Iowa lost in Chuck Long's final game in the 1986 Rose Bowl a 45–28 loss to UCLA, the loophole with the redshirting rule allowed Long to play in his fifth bowl game. He is believed to be the only collegiate player to participate in five bowl games. Long's Iowa teams compiled a 35–13–1 record. He graduated with 10,461 passing yards and 74 touchdowns on 782 completions. He held every passing record at the University of Iowa except one (passes attempted in a game) when he graduated. Long holds the best completion percentage of any college quarterback all-time who has attempted more than 1,000 career passes. He was also the first Big Ten player and just the second player in college football history to throw for more than 10,000 yards in a career. Chuck Long was inducted into the College Football Hall of Fame in 1999 and the Iowa Sports Hall of Fame in 2001.

=== Ronnie Harmon ===
It has been implied that Harmon was actually throwing the game with the fumbles and dropped pass. In the post game interview, Harmon stated,

"You know, I think you have to give UCLA some credit for causing the fumbles ... They kept stripping me of the ball. They must try to do that all the time, and they sure do a good job of it."

Coach Hayden Fry commented on the issue in his 2001 book High Porch Picnic:

"Harmon took a lot of heat because he lost four fumbles, all in the first half. That was uncharacteristic of him; I think he fumbled once during the regular season. The game film reveals that every fumble he lost was caused by a UCLA defender making a hard hit. They just knocked the ball loose. They [UCLA] did a great job of tackling. UCLA made bad things happen to Iowa; Iowa didn't self-destruct. Ronnie Harmon had a tremendous football career with the Hawkeyes, and I hated to see it end that way."

Harmon had 14 carries for a total of 55 yards. In a review of game film in 1987, Big 10 investigators concluded Harmon did not fumble intentionally. An investigation of sports agents Norby Walters and Lloyd Bloom revealed that college football players, including Harmon, had signed contracts and received payments. Harmon testified against Norby and Walters in court, in exchange for immunity. Drafted by the Buffalo Bills, Harmon is one of five NFL running backs ever to gain more than 10,000 all-purpose yards with fewer than 20 fumbles.

=== Terry Donahue ===
This was Donahue's third and final win in the Rose Bowl Game. It was the fourth New Year's Day win in a row for Donahue and the Bruins. It would culminate in an NCAA record seven straight bowl game wins for Donahue and the Bruins following the 1989 Cotton Bowl. Donahue coached in 13 bowl games, second only in the Pac-10 to Don James' 14 bowl games. As of the 2023 season, the Bruins have not won again in the Rose Bowl game.

=== Future NFL players ===
Future NFL Players James Washington, Mike Sherrard, Mark Walen, Ken Norton, Jr., Jim Wahler, Carnell Lake, Darryl Henley, Chuck Long, Ronnie Harmon, Larry Station, Devon Mitchell, Mel Farr Jr., Mike Farr, and Mike Haight played in this game.

=== Future head coaches ===
Bill Snyder, Barry Alvarez, Kirk Ferentz, Dan McCarney, Don Patterson, and Bob Stoops were assistant coaches for Hayden Fry on this Iowa team that would all later become head coaches.

=== Big Ten ===
The 2021–2026 NCAA conference realignment brought UCLA into the Big Ten conference. The Iowa Hawkeyes were scheduled to play UCLA at the Rose Bowl in November 2024, their first re-match in 38 years. UCLA defeated Iowa 20-17 in the conference game.

== Bibliography ==
- University of Iowa Football 2007 Media Fact Book – (PDF copy available at hawkeyesports.cstv.com/ Archived July 1, 2008, at the Wayback Machine)
- UCLA Football Media Guide (PDF Copy available at www.uclabruins.com)
- The 1986 ROSE BOWL GAME IOWA VS. UCLA. Touchdown Publications, January 1, 1986 (Game Program)
- Fry, Hayden; Wine, George (2001). A High Porch Picnic. Sports Publishing LLC. ISBN 1-58261-373-7.
- 1986 Rose Bowl Telecast (Television production). Pasadena, California (USA): NBC. January 1, 1986.
