= 1985 UCLA Bruins football team =

American college football season

1985 UCLA Bruins football

Pac-10 champion Rose Bowl champion

Rose Bowl, W 45–28 vs. Iowa
- Conference: Pacific-10 Conference

Ranking
- Coaches: No. 7
- AP: No. 7
- Record: 9–2–1 (6–2 Pac-10)
- Head coach: Terry Donahue (10th season)
- Offensive coordinator: Homer Smith (8th season)
- Co-defensive coordinators: Bob Field (4th season); Tom Hayes (4th season)
- Home stadium: Rose Bowl

1985 Pacific-10 Conference football standings
	Conf.					Overall
Team	W		L		T	W		L		T
No. 7 UCLA $	6	–	2	–	0	9	–	2	–	1
Arizona	5	–	2	–	0	8	–	3	–	1
Arizona State	5	–	2	–	0	8	–	4	–	0
Washington	5	–	3	–	0	7	–	5	–	0
USC	5	–	3	–	0	6	–	6	–	0
Oregon	3	–	4	–	0	5	–	6	–	0
Washington State	3	–	5	–	0	4	–	7	–	0
Stanford	3	–	5	–	0	4	–	7	–	0
Oregon State	2	–	6	–	0	3	–	8	–	0
California	2	–	7	–	0	4	–	7	–	0
$ – Conference champion; Rankings from AP Poll

The 1985 UCLA Bruins football team was an American football team that represented the University of California, Los Angeles during the 1985 NCAA Division I-A football season. In their tenth year under head coach Terry Donahue, the Bruins compiled a 9–2–1 record (6–2 Pac-10), finished in first place in the Pacific-10 Conference, and were ranked #7 in the final AP Poll.

UCLA defeated defending national champion BYU 27–24 in Provo to start the season, and tied eventual SEC and Sugar Bowl champion Tennessee. The Bruins opened the Pac-10 season by losing 21–14 at Washington. They later got two key wins, the first against Arizona State, the second at Arizona. For much of the season, the rushing defense was ranked second in the nation, behind Oklahoma. They won the rest of their games leading to the 1985 USC vs UCLA game.

Needing a win against 4–5 USC, UCLA struggled. Gaston Green and Mel Farr Jr. had fumbles in the game. UCLA was leading in the fourth quarter 13–10 when Eric Ball fumbled at the USC 1 as he was about to score what would have been the clinching touchdown. Freshman quarterback Rodney Peete led USC on a drive, converting a key fourth down along the way. In the last two minutes, USC again faced a fourth down, this time at UCLA's 2-yard line. USC scored to take a 17–13 lead, then intercepted UCLA quarterback David Norrie as he tried to lead a Bruin comeback. UCLA's loss opened the door for Washington to grab the Rose Bowl berth, but they were upset by Washington State the same day, 21–20. Washington lost the advantage due to their upset home loss to Oregon State. This put Arizona State in position to win the conference as they entered their rivalry game with Arizona with only one conference loss (40–17 to UCLA). But later that evening, Arizona defeated Arizona State 16–13 to cause a tie between UCLA, Arizona State, and Arizona. UCLA won the tiebreaker and the Rose Bowl berth by virtue of its wins over Arizona and Arizona State.

UCLA ended the regular season with a record of 8–2–1, and head coach Terry Donahue had been named Pac-10 Coach of the year. Five Bruin players were first team All-Pac-10: defensive tackle Mark Walen, offensive tackle Mike Hartmeier, kicker John Lee, nose guard Terry Tumey, and inside linebacker Tommy Taylor. Walen was named Pac-10 defensive player of the year. UCLA finished ranked #1 in the nation in rushing defense, at 70.3 yards per game. Oklahoma was second with 89.9 yards per game.

The Bruins went on to defeat #4 Iowa in the 1986 Rose Bowl. Running back Eric Ball was selected as the most valuable player in the 1986 Rose Bowl.

UCLA's offensive leaders in 1985 were quarterback David Norrie with 1,819 passing yards, running back Gaston Green with 712 rushing yards, and wide receiver Karl Dorrell with 565 receiving yards.

== Schedule ==
Date	Opponent	Rank	Site	TV	Result	Attendance	Source
September 7	at No. 8 BYU*	No. 20	Cougar Stadium; Provo, UT	ESPN	W 27–24	65,455	
September 14	at Tennessee*	No. 10	Neyland Stadium; Knoxville, TN	ABC	T 26–26	94,370	
September 21	San Diego State*	No. 12	Rose Bowl; Pasadena, CA		W 34–16	54,625	
September 28	at Washington	No. 13	Husky Stadium; Seattle, WA	CBS	L 14–21	60,801	
October 5	Arizona State		Rose Bowl; Pasadena, CA	CBS	W 40–17	50,494	
October 12	at Stanford		Stanford Stadium; Stanford, CA (rivalry)		W 34–9	63,000	
October 19	at Washington State	No. 18	Martin Stadium; Pullman, WA	KNBC	W 31–30	32,302	
October 26	California	No. 17	Rose Bowl; Pasadena, CA (rivalry)	TBS	W 34–7	61,530	
November 9	at Arizona	No. 14	Arizona Stadium; Tucson, AZ		W 24–19	57,779	
November 16	Oregon State	No. 13	Rose Bowl; Pasadena, CA		W 41–0	45,102	
November 23	at USC	No. 8	Los Angeles Memorial Coliseum; Los Angeles, CA (Victory Bell)		L 13–17	90,064	
January 1, 1986	vs. No. 4 Iowa*	No. 13	Rose Bowl; Pasadena, CA (Rose Bowl)	NBC	W 45–28	103,292	
*Non-conference game; Rankings from AP Poll released prior to the game

== Game summaries ==
=== At No. 8 BYU ===
No. 20 UCLA Bruins at No. 8 BYU Cougars – Game summary

Quarter	1	2	3	4	Total
No. 20 Bruins	10	3	3	11	27
No. 8 Cougars	3	14	0	7	24

at Cougar Stadium, Provo, Utah

- Date: September 7
- Game time: 5:45 p.m. MDT
- Game weather: Partly cloudy, 76 °F (24 °C)
- Game attendance: 65,455

Game information
First quarter
- UCLA – John Lee 25-yard field goal, 8:57. Bruins 3–0.
- BYU – Gary Webster 24-yard field goal, 3:23. Tied 3–3.
- UCLA – Craig Rutledge 65-yard interception return (Gary Webster kick), 1:26. Bruins 10–3.

Second quarter

- BYU – Mark Bellini 10-yard pass from Robbie Bosco (Gary Webster kick), 13:47. Tied 10–10.
- UCLA – John Lee 35-yard field goal, 6:28. Bruins 13–10.
- BYU – Glen Kozlowski 7-yard pass from Robbie Bosco (Gary Webster kick), 3:29. Cougars 17–13.

Third quarter

- UCLA – John Lee 20-yard field goal, 5:29. Cougars 17–16.

Fourth quarter

- UCLA – John Lee 25-yard field goal, 9:01. Bruins 19–17.
- BYU – Robbie Bosco 1-yard run (Gary Webster kick), 2:57. Cougars 24–19.
- UCLA – Gaston Green 2-yard run (Gaston Green run), 1:02. Bruins 27–24.

Team	Category	Player	Statistics
UCLA	Passing	Matt Stevens	6/11, 113 yards
UCLA	Rushing	Marcus Greenwood	13 rushes, 71 yards
UCLA	Receiving	Mike Sherrard	6 receptions, 98 yards
BYU	Passing	Robbie Bosco	29/41, 340 yards, 2 TD, 2 INT
BYU	Rushing	Vai Sikahema	6 rushes, 54 yards
BYU	Receiving	Vai Sikahema	8 receptions, 129 yards

=== At Washington ===
Team	1	2	3	4	Total
UCLA	7	7	0	0	14
• Washington	0	11	10	0	21

- Date: September 28
- Location: Husky Stadium, Seattle
- Game attendance: 60,801
- Game weather: 70 °F (21 °C)

Scoring summary
1	UCLA	Sherrard 26-yard pass from Norrie (Lee kick)	UCLA 7-0
2	WASH	Jaeger 31-yard field goal	UCLA 7-3
2	UCLA	Dorrell 26-yard pass from Norrie (Lee kick)	UCLA 14-3
2	WASH	Hill 31-yard pass from Millen (Millen to Trimble pass)	UCLA 14-11
3	WASH	Jaeger 37-yard field goal	Tied 14-14
3	WASH	Toy 1-yard run (Jaeger kick)	WASH 21-14

=== California ===
California Golden Bears (3–4) at #17 UCLA Bruins (5–1–1)

Quarter	1	2	3	4	Total
California	7	0	0	0	7
UCLA	3	17	7	7	34

at Rose Bowl • Pasadena, California

- Date: October 26
- Game attendance: 61,530

Game information

California

- Brown
  7/15, 78 Yds
- Barbero
  5 Rush, 31 Yds
- Vince Delgado
  6 Rec, 47 Yds, TD

UCLA

- David Norrie
  12/19, 191 Yds, TD, INT
- Eric Ball
  14 Rush, 101 Yds
- Karl Dorrell
  2 Rec, 56 Yds

UCLA moved into first place in the Pac-10 with the win.

Scoring summary

Quarter	Time	Drive			Team	Scoring information	Score	
Quarter	Time	Plays	Yards	TOP	Team	Scoring information	CAL	UCLA
1		13	76		California	Delgado 17-yard touchdown reception from Bedford, Rix kick good	7	0
1					UCLA	46-yard field goal by Lee	7	3
2					UCLA	Farr 45-yard touchdown reception from Norrie, Lee kick good	7	10
2	2:33				UCLA	Interception returned 21 yards for touchdown by Turner, Lee kick good	7	17
2	0:06				UCLA	29-yard field goal by Lee	7	20
3	12:09	7	80	2:51	UCLA	Norrie 3-yard touchdown run, Lee kick good	7	27
4					UCLA	Wilson 38-yard touchdown reception from Stevens, Lee kick good	7	34
"TOP" = time of possession. For other American football terms, see Glossary of American football.							7	34

=== At USC ===
#8 UCLA Bruins (8–1–1) at USC Trojans (4–5)

Quarter	1	2	3	4	Total
UCLA	7	6	0	0	13
USC	7	0	3	7	17

at Los Angeles Memorial Coliseum, Los Angeles, California

- Date: November 23
- Game attendance: 90,064

Game information

First quarter

- UCLA – Eric Ball 1-yard run (John Lee kick). UCLA 7–0. Drive:
- USC – Joe Cormier 34-yard pass from Rodney Peete (Don Shafer kick). Tie 7–7. Drive:

Second quarter

- UCLA – John Lee 22-yard field goal. UCLA 10–7. Drive:
- UCLA – John Lee 34-yard field goal. UCLA 13–7. Drive:

Third quarter

- USC – Don Shafer 38-yard field goal. UCLA 13–10. Drive:

Fourth quarter

- USC – Rodney Peete 1-yard run (Don Shafer kick). USC 17–13. Drive:

Top passers

- UCLA – David Norrie – 14/21, 178 yards, 2 INT
- USC – Rodney Peete – 8/15, 101 yards, TD, INT

Top rushers

- UCLA – Gaston Green – 28 rushes, 145 yards
- USC – Ryan Knight – 32 rushes, 147 yards

Top receivers

- UCLA – Karl Dorrell – 5 receptions, 61 yards
- USC – Joe Cormier – 8 receptions, 101 yards

=== Vs. No. 4 Iowa (Rose Bowl) ===
#13 UCLA vs. #4 Iowa

Team	1	2	3	4	Total
• Bruins	10	14	7	14	45
Hawkeyes	7	3	7	11	28

- Date: January 1, 1986
- Location: Rose Bowl, Pasadena, California
- Game start:
  2:12 p.m. PST
- Elapsed time: 3:18
- Game attendance: 103,292
- Game weather: 71 °F (22 °C), Overcast, Wind S 5 mph (8.0 km/h)
- Referee: Tom Quinn
- TV announcers (NBC): Dick Enberg, Merlin Olsen

Scoring summary
1	7:02	IOWA	David Hudson 1-yard run (Rob Houghtlin kick)	IOWA 7-0
1	3:23	UCLA	Eric Ball 30-yard run (Lee kick)	Tied 7-7
1	1:11	UCLA	John Lee 42-yard field goal	UCLA 10-7
2	7:43	IOWA	Rob Houghtlin 24-yard field goal	Tied 10-10
2	6:19	UCLA	Eric Ball 40-yard run (Lee kick)	UCLA 17-10
2	1:36	UCLA	Eric Ball 6-yard run (Lee kick)	UCLA 24-10
3	12:19	IOWA	Chuck Long 4-yard run (Rob Houghtlin kick)	UCLA 24-17
3	6:25	UCLA	Mike Sherrard 6-yard pass from Matt Stevens (J. Lee kick)	UCLA 31-17
4	13:25	UCLA	Eric Ball 32-yard run (Lee kick)	UCLA 38-17
4	10:51	IOWA	Rob Houghtlin 52-yard field goal	UCLA 38-20
4	6:38	UCLA	Matt Stevens 1-yard run (Lee kick)	UCLA 45-20
4	3:11	IOWA	Bill Happel 11-yard pass from Chuck Long (Harmon run)	UCLA 45-28

== Personnel ==
1985 UCLA Bruins football team roster
Players
Coaches
Offense

Pos.	#	Name	Class
WR	83	Willie Anderson	So
RB	21	Eric Ball	Fr
WR		Dave Clinton
OT	72	Robert Cox
WR		Paco Craig
WR	8	Karl Dorrell	Jr
FB	22	Mel Farr	So
RB		Greg Francois
RB		Bob Garabaldi
C	69	Joe Goebel
RB	44	Gaston Green	So
RB	45	Marcus Greenwood	Jr
G	63	Mike Hartmeier
OT		Robert Jenkins	Sr
OT	70	John Kidder
QB		Brendan McCracken
G	77	Jim McCullough
QB	9	David Norrie	Sr
TE		Jeff Nowinski
RB		James Primus
WR	82	Mike Sherrard	Sr
QB	11	Matt Stevens	Jr
TE	81	Derek Tennell	Jr
RB		Danny Thompson
OL		Jim Warnick
WR		Al Wilson

Defense

Pos.	#	Name	Class
DL		Frank Batchkoff
DB		Joe Gasser
DL		Jeff Glasser
CB	2	Darryl Henley	Fr
LB	59	Melvin Jackson
LB	99	Steve Jarecki	Sr
LB	7	Chance Johnson
DB	31	Carnell Lake	Fr
DB	37	Chuckie Miller	Jr
LB	41	Ken Norton Jr.	So
DB		Dennis Price
DB		Craig Rutledge
LB		Eric Smith
LB	42	Tommy Taylor	Sr
NG	40	Terry Tumey	So
DB	23	Marcus Turner	Fr
DL		Jim Wahler
DT	95	Mark Walen	Sr
DB		James Washington
DL		Doug Wassel

Special teams

Pos.	#	Name	Class
P		Ted Henderson
K	25	John Lee	Sr

Head coach

- Terry Donahue

Coordinators/assistant coaches

- Greg Robinson (DL)

Legend

- (C) Team captain
- (S) Suspended
- (I) Ineligible
- Injured
- Redshirt

== 1986 NFL draft ==
The following players were drafted into professional football following the season.

Player	Position	Round	Pick	Franchise
Mike Sherrard	Wide receiver	1	18	Dallas Cowboys
John Lee	Kicker	2	32	St. Louis Cardinals
Mark Walen	Defensive tackle	3	74	Dallas Cowboys
Tommy Taylor	Linebacker	4	97	San Diego Chargers
Robert Jenkins	Tackle	6	144	Los Angeles Rams
Steve Jarecki	Linebacker	8	195	Los Angeles Rams
