= 1985 Oregon State vs. Washington football game =

Third Biggest Overcome Point Spread in College Football History
- Conference game
Oregon State Beavers	Washington Huskies
(2–4)	(4–2)
21	20
Head coach: Dave Kragthorpe	Head coach: Don James
	1	2	3	4	Total
Oregon State	7	7	0	7	21
Washington	3	7	7	3	20
- Date: October 19, 1985
- Season: 1985
- Stadium: Husky Stadium
- Location: Seattle, Washington
- Favorite: Washington by 38
- National anthem: University of Washington Husky Marching Band
- Halftime show: University of Washington Husky Marching Band
- Attendance: 58,771

The 1985 Oregon State vs. Washington football game was a college football game between the Oregon State Beavers and Washington Huskies that took place at Husky Stadium in Seattle on October 19, 1985. The Pac-10 conference game featured the largest overcome point spread in college football history at the time when the Huskies, favored by 38 points at home, lost 21–20 after the Beavers blocked a punt and recovered the ball in the end zone with 1:29 left to play. It is considered one of the greatest upsets in college football history.

Since this game, there have been two games in college football history with higher point spread upsets. On October 6, 2007, Stanford, a 41-point road underdog, defeated No. 2 USC 24–23. The record was broken again ten years later on September 2, 2017, when UNLV lost to Howard 43–40 as a 45-point home favorite.

== Background ==
During the mid-1980s, the University of Washington Huskies were a powerhouse of American collegiate football, finishing the 1984 season ranked #2 by both the Associated Press and Coaches Poll. After back-to-back losses to open the 1985 season, the Huskies had rebounded, feeling strong as a result of the four-game win streak that had returned the team to the top of the Pac-10 standings.

In stark contrast, the Beavers were coming off four straight losses including back to back blankings against USC and Washington State, where they allowed a total of 97 points. No team in Oregon State history had allowed that many points in back-to-back games. Prior to that, the Beavers lost to Division I-AA team Grambling State 23–6 and to Fresno State 33–24. To make matters worse for Oregon State, starting quarterback Erik Wilhelm was out for the season, and Pac-10 leading receiver Reggie Bynum was also out due to injury. The Beavers had lost the last ten matchups with Washington by an average of 24 points.

The game seemed a clear mismatch, with the Huskies as astounding 38-point favorites to win the game. When the Las Vegas betting odds were published the Seattle media had a field day insulting the mighty Huskies' hapless foes. One reporter went so far as to say that "Oregon State plays football pretty much the way Barney Fife played a deputy sheriff on Mayberry." In a television interview, UW head coach Don James said he expected to give his reserve quarterback Chris Chandler a chance for some playing time.

First-year OSU head coach Dave Kragthorpe used the media comments in his pre-game speech to the Beavers in an effort to motivate them to prove critics wrong before they went out on the field.

== The game ==
Washington put the first points up on the board after a Jeff Jaeger field goal put the Huskies up 3–0 in the first quarter. Oregon State backup quarterback Rich Gonzales responded by stunning the Huskies with a 43-yard touchdown pass to Darvin Malone on the following drive, giving the Beavers the lead. Washington responded with an 80-yard drive and a touchdown of their own, regaining the lead 10–7.

On the next drive, Washington forced Oregon State into a 4th and 20 position on their own 28-yard line. A Husky rush forced the punter to attempt to run for the first down instead of punting the ball, being stopped 10 yards short, turning the ball over on downs to the Huskies on the Beavers' 38 yard line. Washington drove to the 8-yard line, but Husky quarterback Hugh Millen threw an interception in the end zone to give possession back to the Beavers. Oregon State then capped off an 80-yard drive with a 20-yard scramble for a touchdown by Gonzales, and the Beavers led 14–10 at halftime.

Washington took the lead again the lead in the third quarter, going up 17–14. With 1:32 left in the quarter, Washington had first and goal at the one-yard line, twice trying to run the ball up the middle and failing to get the score. On third down, OSU linebacker Osia Lewis knocked out Washington running back Vince Weathersby with his tackle, causing a fumble that Oregon State recovered.

With 7:59 left, Washington's Jaeger hit another field goal to extend the lead to 20–14.

With under two minutes remaining, Washington was forced to punt from right outside their own end zone. Oregon State's Andre Todd rushed Husky punter Thane Cleland and blocked the punt, sending the ball flying into Washington's end zone, nearly causing a safety. However, the bounce went Oregon State's way and the ball stayed in the end zone, allowing the Beavers' Lavance Northington to recover it for a touchdown. The extra point was good and the Beavers led 21–20, which was the final score, resulting in the biggest overcome point spread in college football history at the time.

== Aftermath ==
Oregon State players celebrated, shouting "You can blame this one on your media" as they returned to the locker room. The Seattle media did not appear to ask Kragthorpe questions after the game.

The loss had the effect of knocking the Huskies out of the Rose Bowl, which was won by conference champion UCLA. The Bruins lost their final game of the regular season to rival USC and finished with a conference record of 6–2, which would have been the same record of the 5–3 Huskies, had they handled Oregon State (or rival Washington State; both losses were in Seattle by the same score). Having defeated UCLA at Husky Stadium in late September, Washington owned the tie-breaker and would have played in Pasadena with a 6–2 record. They finished the regular season at 6–5 overall, then defeated Colorado in the Freedom Bowl in Anaheim on December 30.

Oregon State did not win any more games for the rest of the season and ended at ninth place in the Pac-10. Their next win over the Huskies was in 2001 and the next win in Husky Stadium came in 2004.

While some sports historians believe that the shocking 1921 defeat of mighty Harvard College by unheralded Centre College of Danville, Kentucky, constitutes the greatest upset in collegiate football history, the 1985 Oregon State defeat of 38-point favorite Washington constituted at the time the greatest outright loss of a Las Vegas favorite in American college football history.

== See also ==
- 2006 Michigan State vs. Northwestern football game, the biggest comeback in NCAA Division I-A/FBS history
- 2006 Insight Bowl, the biggest comeback in NCAA Division I-A/FBS postseason history
- 2007 Stanford vs. USC football game
