= Pac-12 Conference football individual awards =

Coaches of the Pac-12 Conference bestow the following awards at the end of each football season. The conference was founded in its current form as the Athletic Association of Western Universities in 1959, but traces its roots to the Pacific Coast Conference, founded in 1915. The conference name changed to Pacific-8 Conference (Pac-8) in 1968 and Pacific-10 Conference (Pac-10) in 1978. The conference's 2011 expansion to 12 members saw the conference formally renamed as the Pac-12 Conference.

After the 2023 season, the Pac-12 lost 10 members to other power conferences, with Oregon State and Washington State as the only remaining members. The conference operated with only those teams in the 2024 and 2025 seasons. The Pac-12 resumed full operation in 2026 with eight football members.

== Player of the Year ==
Award started in 1975 as Player of the Year, any offensive or defensive players could be winners, but only offensive players won it. The award was replaced with separate offensive and defensive selections in 1983.

Prior to 1975, two outside organizations presented player of the year awards. The W. J. Voit Memorial Trophy was awarded from 1951 to 1978 to the outstanding college football player on the Pacific Coast and was awarded each year to a conference player. The Pop Warner Trophy was awarded from 1949 to 2004 to the most valuable senior on the West Coast and was not limited to conference players.

| Season | Player | Pos. | Team | Ref. |
|---|---|---|---|---|
| 1975 | Chuck Muncie | RB | California | |
| 1976 | Ricky Bell | RB | USC | |
| 1977 | Guy Benjamin | QB | Stanford | |
| 1977 | Warren Moon | QB | Washington | |
| 1978 | Charles White | RB | USC | |
| 1979 | Charles White (2) | RB | USC | |
| 1980 | John Elway | QB | Stanford | |
| 1981 | Marcus Allen | RB | USC | |
| 1982 | John Elway (2) | QB | Stanford | |
| 1982 | Tom Ramsey | QB | UCLA | |

=== Offensive Player of the Year ===
| Season | Player | Pos. | Team | Ref. |
|---|---|---|---|---|
| 1983 | Steve Pelluer | QB | Washington | |
| 1984 | Rueben Mayes | RB | Washington State | |
| 1985 | Rueben Mayes (2) | RB | Washington State | |
| 1986 | Brad Muster | RB | Stanford | |
| 1987 | Troy Aikman | QB | UCLA | |
| 1988 | Rodney Peete | QB | USC | |
| 1989 | Steve Broussard | RB | Washington State | |
| 1990 | Greg Lewis | RB | Washington | |
| 1991 | Mike Pawlawski | QB | California | |
| 1991 | Mario Bailey | WR | Washington | |
| 1992 | Drew Bledsoe | QB | Washington State | |
| 1993 | J. J. Stokes | WR | UCLA | |
| 1994 | Napoleon Kaufman | RB | Washington | |
| 1995 | Keyshawn Johnson | WR | USC | |
| 1996 | Jake Plummer | QB | Arizona State | |
| 1997 | Ryan Leaf | QB | Washington State | |
| 1998 | Cade McNown | QB | UCLA | |
| 1998 | Akili Smith | QB | Oregon | |
| 1999 | Troy Walters | WR | Stanford | |
| 2000 | Marques Tuiasosopo | QB | Washington | |
| 2001 | Joey Harrington | QB | Oregon | |
| 2002 | Jason Gesser | QB | Washington State | |
| 2002 | Carson Palmer | QB | USC | |
| 2003 | Matt Leinart | QB | USC | |
| 2004 | Matt Leinart (2) | QB | USC | |
| 2004 | Reggie Bush | RB | USC | |
| 2005 | Reggie Bush (2) | RB | USC | |
| 2006 | Marshawn Lynch | RB | California | |
| 2007 | Dennis Dixon | QB | Oregon | |
| 2008 | Jacquizz Rodgers | RB | Oregon State | |
| 2009 | Toby Gerhart | RB | Stanford | |
| 2010 | Andrew Luck | QB | Stanford | |
| 2011 | Andrew Luck (2) | QB | Stanford | |
| 2012 | Marqise Lee | WR | USC | |
| 2013 | Ka'Deem Carey | RB | Arizona | |
| 2014 | Marcus Mariota | QB | Oregon | |
| 2015 | Christian McCaffrey | RB | Stanford | |
| 2016 | Jake Browning | QB | Washington | |
| 2017 | Bryce Love | RB | Stanford | |
| 2018 | Gardner Minshew | QB | Washington State | |
| 2019 | Zack Moss | RB | Utah | |
| 2020 | Jarek Broussard | RB | Colorado | |
| 2021 | Drake London | WR | USC | |
| 2022 | Caleb Williams | QB | USC | |
| 2023 | Bo Nix | QB | Oregon | |

=== Pat Tillman Defensive Player of the Year ===
From 1983 to 2003, this award was known simply as Pac-10 Defensive Player of the Year. In 2004, the award was renamed as Pat Tillman Defensive Player of the Year in honor of Arizona State's Pat Tillman.

| Season | Player | Pos. | Team | Ref. |
|---|---|---|---|---|
| 1983 | Ricky Hunley | LB | Arizona | |
| 1983 | Ron Rivera | LB | California | |
| 1984 | Duane Bickett | LB | USC | |
| 1985 | Mark Walen | DT | UCLA | |
| 1986 | Byron Evans | LB | Arizona | |
| 1987 | Chuck Cecil | S | Arizona | |
| 1988 | Dana Wells | NT | Arizona | |
| 1989 | Junior Seau | LB | USC | |
| 1990 | Steve Emtman | DT | Washington | |
| 1990 | Darryll Lewis | CB | Arizona | |
| 1991 | Steve Emtman (2) | DT | Washington | |
| 1992 | Dave Hoffmann | LB | Washington | |
| 1993 | Rob Waldrop | NT | Arizona | |
| 1994 | Mark Fields | LB | Washington State | |
| 1995 | Tedy Bruschi | DE | Arizona | |
| 1996 | Jason Chorak | LB | Washington | |
| 1997 | Pat Tillman | LB | Arizona State | |
| 1998 | Chris Claiborne | LB | USC | |
| 1999 | Deltha O'Neal | CB | California | |
| 2000 | Adam Archuleta | LB | Arizona State | |
| 2001 | Robert Thomas | LB | UCLA | |
| 2002 | Terrell Suggs | DE | Arizona State | |
| 2003 | Dave Ball | DE | UCLA | |
| 2004 | Shaun Cody | DT | USC | |
| 2004 | Bill Swancutt | DE | Oregon State | |
| 2005 | Haloti Ngata | DT | Oregon | |
| 2005 | Dale Robinson | LB | Arizona State | |
| 2006 | Dante Hughes | CB | California | |
| 2007 | Sedrick Ellis | NT | USC | |
| 2008 | Rey Maualuga | LB | USC | |
| 2009 | Brian Price | DT | UCLA | |
| 2010 | Stephen Paea | DT | Oregon State | |
| 2011 | Mychal Kendricks | LB | California | |
| 2012 | Will Sutton | DE | Arizona State | |
| 2013 | Will Sutton (2) | DE | Arizona State | |
| 2014 | Scooby Wright | LB | Arizona | |
| 2015 | DeForest Buckner | DE | Oregon | |
| 2016 | Adoree' Jackson | CB | USC | |
| 2017 | Vita Vea | DT | Washington | |
| 2018 | Ben Burr-Kirven | LB | Washington | |
| 2019 | Evan Weaver | LB | California | |
| 2020 | Talanoa Hufanga | S | USC | |
| 2021 | Devin Lloyd | LB | Utah | |
| 2022 | Tuli Tuipulotu | DE | USC | |
| 2023 | Laiatu Latu | DE | UCLA | |

== Top Performers ==
In 2024 and 2025, after the conference was reduced to only two teams, the conference did not designate All-Conference Teams, an Offensive or Defensive Player of the Year or Offensive or Defensive Freshman of the Year. Instead, conference staff and media voted on "standout performers among its football student-athletes" who would "be recognized as 'Top Performers' in the league’s archives and historical records." The categories were Offensive, Defensive, Offensive Lineman, Defensive Lineman, Special Teams and Freshman.

=== Offensive Top Performer ===
| Season | Player | Pos. | Team | Ref. |
|---|---|---|---|---|
| 2024 | John Mateer | QB | Washington State | |
| 2025 | Anthony Hankerson | RB | Oregon State | |

=== Defensive Top Performer ===
| Season | Player | Pos. | Team | Ref. |
|---|---|---|---|---|
| 2024 | Taariq Al-Uqdah | LB | Washington State | |
| 2025 | Parker McKenna | LB | Washington State | |

=== Offensive Line Top Performer ===
| Season | Player | Pos. | Team | Ref. |
|---|---|---|---|---|
| 2024 | Gerad Christian-Lichtenhan | OL | Oregon State | |
| 2025 | Ryan Berger | OL | Oregon State | |

=== Defensive Line Top Performer ===
| Season | Player | Pos. | Team | Ref. |
|---|---|---|---|---|
| 2024 | Ansel Din-Mbuh | DL | Washington State | |
| 2025 | Isaac Terrell | DE | Washington State | |

=== Special Teams Top Performer ===
| Season | Player | Pos. | Team | Ref. |
|---|---|---|---|---|
| 2024 | Dean Janikowski | P/K | Washington State | |
| 2025 | Tony Freeman | WR/PR | Washington State | |

=== Freshman Top Performer ===
| Season | Player | Pos. | Team | Ref. |
|---|---|---|---|---|
| 2024 | Wayshawn Parker | RB | Washington State | |
| 2025 | Trey Glasper | DB | Oregon State | |

== Freshman of the Year ==
Award started in 1999, it was replaced with separate offensive and defensive selections in 2009.

| Season | Player | Pos. | Team | Ref. |
|---|---|---|---|---|
| 1999 | Kareem Kelly | WR | USC | |
| 2000 | Terrell Suggs | DE | Arizona State | |
| 2001 | Teyo Johnson | WR | Stanford | |
| 2001 | Reggie Williams | WR | Washington | |
| 2002 | Mike Williams | WR | USC | |
| 2003 | Brandon Browner | CB | Oregon State | |
| 2004 | Zach Miller | TE | Arizona State | |
| 2005 | Jeremy Perry | G | Oregon State | |
| 2005 | Mike Thomas | WR | Arizona | |
| 2006 | Jairus Byrd | CB | Oregon | |
| 2006 | Taylor Mays | S | USC | |
| 2006 | Alterraun Verner | CB | UCLA | |
| 2007 | Jake Locker | QB | Washington | |
| 2008 | Jacquizz Rodgers | RB | Oregon State | |

=== Offensive Freshman of the Year ===
| Season | Player | Pos. | Team | Ref. |
|---|---|---|---|---|
| 2009 | LaMichael James | RB | Oregon | |
| 2010 | Robert Woods | WR | USC | |
| 2011 | De'Anthony Thomas | RB | Oregon | |
| 2011 | Marqise Lee | WR | USC | |
| 2012 | Marcus Mariota | QB | Oregon | |
| 2013 | Myles Jack | RB | UCLA | |
| 2014 | Royce Freeman | RB | Oregon | |
| 2015 | Josh Rosen | QB | UCLA | |
| 2016 | Sam Darnold | QB | USC | |
| 2017 | J. J. Taylor | RB | Arizona | |
| 2017 | Walker Little | OT | Stanford | |
| 2018 | Jermar Jefferson | RB | Oregon State | |
| 2019 | Kedon Slovis | QB | USC | |
| 2020 | Ty Jordan | RB | Utah | |
| 2021 | Jayden de Laura | QB | Washington State | |
| 2022 | Damien Martinez | RB | Oregon State | |
| 2023 | Noah Fifita | QB | Arizona | |

=== Defensive Freshman of the Year ===
| Season | Player | Pos. | Team | Ref. |
|---|---|---|---|---|
| 2009 | Vontaze Burfict | LB | Arizona State | |
| 2010 | Junior Onyeali | DE | Arizona State | |
| 2011 | Dion Bailey | LB | USC | |
| 2012 | Leonard Williams | DE | USC | |
| 2013 | Myles Jack | LB | UCLA | |
| 2014 | Adoree' Jackson | CB | USC | |
| 2015 | Cameron Smith | LB | USC | |
| 2016 | Taylor Rapp | S | Washington | |
| 2017 | Colin Schooler | LB | Arizona | |
| 2018 | Merlin Robertson | LB | Arizona State | |
| 2019 | Kayvon Thibodeaux | DE | Oregon | |
| 2020 | Noah Sewell | LB | Oregon | |
| 2021 | Junior Tafuna | DT | Utah | |
| 2022 | Lander Barton | LB | Utah | |
| 2023 | Cade Uluave | LB | California | |

== Morris Trophy ==
The Morris Trophy is awarded annually to the best offensive and defensive linemen in the conference, as selected by opposing players.

=== Offense ===
| Year | Player | School (#) |
|---|---|---|
| 1980 | Roy Foster | USC (1) |
| 1981 | Roy Foster (2) | USC (2) |
| 1982 | Bruce Matthews | USC (3) |
| 1983 | Gary Zimmerman | Oregon (1) |
| 1984 | Dan Lynch | Washington State (1) |
| 1985 | Jeff Bregel | USC (4) |
| 1986 | Danny Villa | Arizona State (1) |
| 1987 | Randall McDaniel | Arizona State (2) |
| 1988 | Joe Tofflemire | Arizona (1) |
| 1989 | Bern Brostek | Washington (1) |
| 1990 | Pat Harlow | USC (5) |
| 1991 | Lincoln Kennedy | Washington (2) |
| 1992 | Lincoln Kennedy (2) | Washington (3) |
| 1993 | Todd Steussie | California (1) |
| 1994 | Tony Boselli | USC (6) |
| 1995 | Jonathan Ogden | UCLA (1) |
| 1996 | Bob Sapp | Washington (4) |
| 1997 | Olin Kreutz | Washington (5) |
| 1998 | Yusuf Scott | Arizona (2) |
| 1999 | Travis Claridge | USC (7) |
| 2000 | Chad Ward | Washington (6) |
| 2001 | Levi Jones | Arizona State (3) |
| 2002 | Kwame Harris | Stanford (1) |
| 2003 | Jacob Rogers | USC (8) |
| 2004 | Adam Snyder | Oregon (2) |
| 2005 | Ryan O'Callaghan | California (2) |
| 2006 | Ryan Kalil | USC (9) |
| 2007 | Alex Mack | California (3) |
| 2008 | Alex Mack (2) | California (4) |
| 2009 | Charles Brown | USC (10) |
| 2010 | Tyron Smith | USC (11) |
| 2011 | Matt Kalil | USC (12) |
| 2012 | David Yankey | Stanford (2) |
| 2013 | Xavier Su'a-Filo | UCLA (2) |
| 2014 | Andrus Peat | Stanford (3) |
| 2015 | Joshua Garnett | Stanford (4) |
| 2016 | Isaac Asiata | Utah (1) |
| 2017 | Tyrell Crosby | Oregon (3) |
| 2018 | Kaleb McGary | Washington (7) |
| 2019 | Penei Sewell | Oregon (4) |
| 2020 | Alijah Vera-Tucker | USC (13) |
| 2021 | Nick Ford | Utah (2) |
| 2022 | Andrew Vorhees | USC (14) |
| 2023 | Troy Fautanu | Washington (8) |

=== Defense ===
| Year | Player | School (#) |
|---|---|---|
| 1980 | Vince Goldsmith | Oregon (1) |
| 1981 | Fletcher Jenkins | Washington (1) |
| 1982 | George Achica | USC (1) |
| 1983 | Keith Millard | Washington State (1) |
| 1984 | Ron Holmes | Washington (2) |
| 1985 | Erik Howard | Washington State (2) |
| 1986 | Reggie Rogers | Washington (3) |
| 1987 | Dana Wells | Arizona (1) |
| 1988 | Dana Wells (2) | Arizona (2) |
| 1989 | Esera Tuaolo | Oregon State (1) |
| 1990 | Steve Emtman | Washington (4) |
| 1991 | Steve Emtman (2) | Washington (5) |
| 1992 | Rob Waldrop | Arizona (3) |
| 1993 | D'Marco Farr | Washington (6) |
| 1994 | Chad Eaton | Washington State (3) |
| 1995 | Tedy Bruschi | Arizona (4) |
| 1996 | Darrell Russell | USC (2) |
| 1997 | Jeremy Staat | Arizona State (1) |
| 1998 | Inoke Breckterfield | Oregon State (2) |
| 1999 | Willie Howard | Stanford (1) |
| 2000 | Andre Carter | California (1) |
| 2001 | Kenyon Coleman | UCLA (1) |
| 2002 | Terrell Suggs | Arizona State (2) |
| 2003 | Dave Ball | UCLA (2) |
| 2004 | Bill Swancutt | Oregon State (3) |
| 2005 | Haloti Ngata | Oregon (2) |
| 2006 | Sedrick Ellis | USC (3) |
| 2007 | Sedrick Ellis (2) | USC (4) |
| 2008 | Nick Reed | Oregon (3) |
| 2009 | Stephen Paea | Oregon State (4) |
| 2010 | Stephen Paea (2) | Oregon State (5) |
| 2011 | Star Lotulelei | Utah (1) |
| 2012 | Will Sutton | Arizona State (3) |
| 2013 | Will Sutton (2) | Arizona State (4) |
| 2014 | Nate Orchard | Utah (2) |
| 2015 | DeForest Buckner | Oregon (4) |
| 2016 | Solomon Thomas | Stanford (2) |
| 2017 | Vita Vea | Washington (7) |
| 2018 | Greg Gaines | Washington (8) |
| 2019 | Bradlee Anae | Utah (3) |
| 2020 | Kayvon Thibodeaux | Oregon (5) |
| 2021 | Mika Tafua | Utah (4) |
| 2022 | Tuli Tuipulotu | USC (5) |
| 2023 | Laiatu Latu | UCLA (3) |

== Coach of the Year ==
The following coach were selected as coach of the year.

| Year | Player | School (#) | Ref. |
|---|---|---|---|
| 1975 | Dick Vermeil | UCLA (1) | |
| 1976 | John Robinson | USC (1) | |
| 1977 | Bill Walsh | Stanford (1) | |
| 1978 | John Robinson (2) | USC (2) | |
| 1979 | Rich Brooks | Oregon (1) | |
| 1980 | Don James | Washington (1) | |
| 1981 | Jim Walden | Washington State (1) | |
| 1982 | Joe Kapp | California (1) | |
| 1983 | Jim Walden (2) | Washington State (2) | |
| 1984 | Ted Tollner | USC (3) | |
| 1985 | Terry Donahue | UCLA (2) | |
| 1986 | John Cooper | Arizona State (1) | |
| 1987 | Larry Smith | USC (4) | |
| 1988 | Dennis Erickson | Washington State (3) | |
| 1988 | Larry Smith (2) | USC (5) | |
| 1989 | Dave Kragthorpe | Oregon State (1) | |
| 1990 | Don James (2) | Washington (2) | |
| 1990 | Bruce Snyder | California (2) | |
| 1991 | Don James (3) | Washington (3) | |
| 1992 | Dick Tomey | Arizona (1) | |
| 1993 | Terry Donahue (2) | UCLA (3) | |
| 1994 | Rich Brooks (2) | Oregon (2) | |
| 1995 | Tyrone Willingham | Stanford (2) | |
| 1996 | Bruce Snyder (2) | Arizona State (2) | |
| 1997 | Mike Price | Washington State (4) | |
| 1998 | Bob Toledo | UCLA (4) | |
| 1999 | Tyrone Willingham (2) | Stanford (3) | |
| 2000 | Dennis Erickson (2) | Oregon State (2) | |
| 2001 | Mike Price (2) | Washington State (5) | |
| 2002 | Jeff Tedford | California (3) | |
| 2003 | Pete Carroll | USC (6) | |
| 2003 | Bill Doba | Washington State (6) | |
| 2004 | Jeff Tedford (2) | California (4) | |
| 2005 | Pete Carroll (2) | USC (7) | |
| 2005 | Karl Dorrell | UCLA (5) | |
| 2006 | Pete Carroll (3) | USC (8) | |
| 2007 | Dennis Erickson (3) | Arizona State (3) | |
| 2008 | Mike Riley | Oregon State (3) | |
| 2009 | Chip Kelly | Oregon (3) | |
| 2010 | Chip Kelly (2) | Oregon (4) | |
| 2011 | David Shaw | Stanford (4) | |
| 2012 | David Shaw (2) | Stanford (5) | |
| 2013 | Todd Graham | Arizona State (4) | |
| 2014 | Rich Rodriguez | Arizona (2) | |
| 2015 | David Shaw (3) | Stanford (6) | |
| 2015 | Mike Leach | Washington State (7) | |
| 2016 | Mike MacIntyre | Colorado (1) | |
| 2017 | David Shaw (4) | Stanford (7) | |
| 2018 | Mike Leach (2) | Washington State (8) | |
| 2019 | Kyle Whittingham (1) | Utah (1) | |
| 2020 | Karl Dorrell (2) | Colorado (2) | |
| 2021 | Kyle Whittingham (2) | Utah (2) | |
| 2022 | Kalen DeBoer | Washington (4) | |
| 2022 | Jonathan Smith | Oregon State (4) | |
| 2023 | Kalen DeBoer (2) | Washington (5) | |

== All-Century Team ==
In honor of the 100th anniversary of the establishment of the conference, an All-Century Team was unveiled on December 2, 2015, voted on by a panel of coaches, players, and the media.

Elected to the College Football Hall of Fame

=== Offense ===
| Pos. | Player | Team | Tenure |
|---|---|---|---|
| QB | **John Elway** | Stanford | 1979–1982 |
| QB | Marcus Mariota | Oregon | 2011–2014 |
| QB | Jim Plunkett | Stanford | 1968–1970 |
| QB | Andrew Luck | Stanford | 2008–2011 |
| QB | Matt Leinart | USC | 2001–2005 |
| RB | Marcus Allen | USC | 1978–1981 |
| RB | O. J. Simpson | USC | 1967–1968 |
| RB | Charles White | USC | 1976–1979 |
| RB | Reggie Bush | USC | 2003–2005 |
| RB | Mike Garrett | USC | 1963–1965 |
| WR | Keyshawn Johnson | USC | 1994–1995 |
| WR | Lynn Swann | USC | 1970–1973 |
| WR | Marqise Lee | USC | 2011–2013 |
| WR | J. J. Stokes | UCLA | 1991–1994 |
| WR | Ken Margerum | Stanford | 1977–1980 |
| TE | Tony Gonzalez | California | 1994–1996 |
| TE | Charle Young | USC | 1970–1972 |
| OL | Jonathan Ogden | UCLA | 1992–1995 |
| OL | Ron Yary | USC | 1965–1967 |
| OL | Tony Boselli | USC | 1991–1994 |
| OL | Anthony Muñoz | USC | 1976–1979 |
| OL | Lincoln Kennedy | Washington | 1989–1992 |
| OL | Brad Budde | USC | 1976–1979 |
| OL | Randall McDaniel | Arizona State | 1984–1987 |

=== Defense ===
| Pos. | Player | Team | Tenure |
|---|---|---|---|
| DE | Tedy Bruschi | Arizona | 1991–1995 |
| DE | Terrell Suggs | Arizona State | 2000–2002 |
| DE | Willie McGinest | USC | 1990–1993 |
| DE | Andre Carter | California | 1997–2000 |
| DE | Jim Jeffcoat | Arizona State | 1979–1982 |
| DT | Steve Emtman | Washington | 1989–1991 |
| DT | Haloti Ngata | Oregon | 2002–2005 |
| DT | Rob Waldrop | Arizona | 1990–1993 |
| DT | Leonard Williams | USC | 2012–2014 |
| DT | Ed White | California | 1966–1968 |
| LB | Junior Seau | USC | 1987–1989 |
| LB | Jerry Robinson | UCLA | 1975–1978 |
| LB | Ricky Hunley | Arizona | 1980–1983 |
| LB | Richard Wood | USC | 1972–1974 |
| LB | Chris Claiborne | USC | 1996–1998 |
| CB | Joey Browner | USC | 1979–1982 |
| CB | Mel Renfro | Oregon | 1961–1963 |
| CB | Chris McAlister | Arizona | 1996–1998 |
| CB | Antoine Cason | Arizona | 2004–2007 |
| S | **Ronnie Lott** | USC | 1977–1980 |
| S | Kenny Easley | UCLA | 1977–1980 |
| S | Troy Polamalu | USC | 1999–2002 |
| S | Mark Carrier | USC | 1987–1989 |

=== Special teams and coach ===
| Pos. | Player | Team | Tenure |
|---|---|---|---|
| K | Jason Hanson | Washington State | 1988–1991 |
| P | Tom Hackett | Utah | 2012–2015 |
| RS | Reggie Bush | USC | 2003–2005 |
| HC | **John McKay** | USC | 1960–1975 |

Note: Bold denotes offensive, defensive and coach of the Century selections. The voting panel was made up of 119 former players, coaches and media.

== See also ==
- List of All-Pac-12 Conference football teams
