= 1985 USC Trojans football team =

American college football season

1985 USC Trojans football

Aloha Bowl, L 3–24 vs. Alabama
- Conference: Pacific-10 Conference
- Record: 6–6 (5–3 Pac-10)
- Head coach: Ted Tollner (3rd season)
- Captains: Matt Koart; Hank Norman
- Home stadium: Los Angeles Memorial Coliseum

1985 Pacific-10 Conference football standings
| | Conf. | | | | | Overall |
| Team | W | | L | | T | W | | L | | T |
|---|---|---|---|---|---|---|---|---|---|---|
| No. 7 UCLA $ | 6 | – | 2 | – | 0 | 9 | – | 2 | – | 1 |
| Arizona | 5 | – | 2 | – | 0 | 8 | – | 3 | – | 1 |
| Arizona State | 5 | – | 2 | – | 0 | 8 | – | 4 | – | 0 |
| Washington | 5 | – | 3 | – | 0 | 7 | – | 5 | – | 0 |
| USC | 5 | – | 3 | – | 0 | 6 | – | 6 | – | 0 |
| Oregon | 3 | – | 4 | – | 0 | 5 | – | 6 | – | 0 |
| Washington State | 3 | – | 5 | – | 0 | 4 | – | 7 | – | 0 |
| Stanford | 3 | – | 5 | – | 0 | 4 | – | 7 | – | 0 |
| Oregon State | 2 | – | 6 | – | 0 | 3 | – | 8 | – | 0 |
| California | 2 | – | 7 | – | 0 | 4 | – | 7 | – | 0 |
$ – Conference champion; Rankings from AP Poll

The 1985 USC Trojans football team represented the University of Southern California during the 1985 NCAA Division I-A football season.

== Schedule ==
| Date | Opponent | Rank | Site | Result | Attendance | Source |
|---|---|---|---|---|---|---|
| September 7 | at No. 11 Illinois* | No. 6 | Memorial Stadium; Champaign, IL | W 20–10 | 76,369 | |
| September 21 | Baylor* | No. 3 | Los Angeles Memorial Coliseum; Los Angeles, CA | L 13–20 | 52,544 | |
| September 28 | at Arizona State | No. 18 | Sun Devil Stadium; Tempe, AZ | L 0–24 | 70,710 | |
| October 5 | Oregon State^{†} | | Los Angeles Memorial Coliseum; Los Angeles, CA | W 63–0 | 50,624 | |
| October 19 | Stanford | | Los Angeles Memorial Coliseum; Los Angeles, CA (rivalry) | W 30–6 | 56,837 | |
| October 26 | at Notre Dame* | | Notre Dame Stadium; Notre Dame, IN (rivalry) | L 3–37 | 59,075 | |
| November 2 | Washington State | | Los Angeles Memorial Coliseum; Los Angeles, CA | W 31–13 | 46,954 | |
| November 9 | at California | | California Memorial Stadium; Berkeley, CA | L 6–14 | 63,500 | |
| November 16 | at Washington | | Husky Stadium; Seattle, WA | L 17–20 | 59,417 | |
| November 23 | No. 8 UCLA | | Los Angeles Memorial Coliseum; Los Angeles, CA (Victory Bell) | W 17–13 | 90,064 | |
| November 30 | vs. Oregon | | Olympic Memorial Stadium; Tokyo, Japan (Mirage Bowl) | W 20–6 | 65,000 | |
| December 28 | vs. No. 15 Alabama* | | Aloha Stadium; Halawa, HI (Aloha Bowl) | L 3–24 | 65,000 | |
*Non-conference game; ^{†}Homecoming; Rankings from AP Poll released prior to the game

== Game summaries ==
=== At No. 11 Illinois ===
USC at Illinois

| Team | 1 | 2 | 3 | 4 | Total |
|---|---|---|---|---|---|
| • No. 6 Trojans | 14 | 3 | 3 | 0 | 20 |
| No. 11 Fighting Illini | 0 | 0 | 7 | 3 | 10 |

- Date: September 7
- Location: Memorial Stadium
  Champaign, Illinois
- Game attendance: 76,639
- Game weather: 90 °F (32 °C)

Scoring summary
| 1 | USC | Hank Norman 9-yard pass from Sean Salisbury (Don Shafer kick) | USC 7–0 |
| 1 | USC | Randy Tanner 46-yard pass from Sean Salisbury (Don Shafer kick) | USC 14–0 |
| 2 | USC | Don Shafer 46-yard field goal | USC 17–0 |
| 3 | USC | Don Shafer 23-yard field goal | USC 20–0 |
| 3 | Illinois | Cap Boso 83-yard pass from Jack Trudeau (Chris White kick) | USC 20–7 |
| 4 | Illinois | Chris White 28-yard field goal | USC 20–10 |

=== Baylor ===
| Team | 1 | 2 | 3 | 4 | Total |
|---|---|---|---|---|---|
| • Bears | 0 | 10 | 7 | 3 | 20 |
| No. 3 Trojans | 7 | 0 | 0 | 6 | 13 |

- Date: September 21
- Location: Los Angeles Memorial Coliseum
  Los Angeles, California
- Game attendance: 53,246
- TV announcers (Lorimar): Geoff Witcher (play-by-play) and Jim Perry (analyst)

Scoring summary
| 1 | | USC | Hank Norman 9-yard pass from Sean Salisbury (Don Shafer kick) | USC 7–0 |
| 2 | 2:46 | Baylor | Tom Muecke 3-yard run (Terry Syler kick) | Tied 7–7 |
| 2 | | Baylor | Terry Syler 39-yard field goal | Baylor 10–7 |
| 3 | 9:49 | Baylor | Derrick McAdoo 22-yard pass from Tom Muecke (Terry Syler kick) | Baylor 17–7 |
| 4 | | USC | Randy Tanner 19-yard pass from Sean Salisbury (kick blocked) | Baylor 17–13 |
| 4 | 6:06 | Baylor | Terry Syler 32-yard field goal | Baylor 20–13 |

=== UCLA ===
#8 UCLA Bruins (8–1–1) at USC Trojans (4–5)

| Quarter | 1 | 2 | 3 | 4 | Total |
|---|---|---|---|---|---|
| UCLA | 7 | 6 | 0 | 0 | 13 |
| USC | 7 | 0 | 3 | 7 | 17 |

at Los Angeles Memorial Coliseum, Los Angeles, California

- Date: November 23
- Game attendance: 90,064

Game information

First quarter

- UCLA – Eric Ball 1-yard run (John Lee kick). UCLA 7–0. Drive:
- USC – Joe Cormier 34-yard pass from Rodney Peete (Don Shafer kick). Tie 7–7. Drive:

Second quarter

- UCLA – John Lee 22-yard field goal. UCLA 10–7. Drive:
- UCLA – John Lee 34-yard field goal. UCLA 13–7. Drive:

Third quarter

- USC – Don Shafer 38-yard field goal. UCLA 13–10. Drive:

Fourth quarter

- USC – Rodney Peete 1-yard run (Don Shafer kick). USC 17–13. Drive:

Top passers

- UCLA – David Norrie – 14/21, 178 yards, 2 INT
- USC – Rodney Peete – 8/15, 101 yards, TD, INT

Top rushers

- UCLA – Gaston Green – 28 rushes, 145 yards
- USC – Ryan Knight – 32 rushes, 147 yards

Top receivers

- UCLA – Karl Dorrell – 5 receptions, 61 yards
- USC – Joe Cormier – 8 receptions, 101 yards

=== Vs. Oregon ===
Oregon vs. USC

| Team | 1 | 2 | 3 | 4 | Total |
|---|---|---|---|---|---|
| Ducks | 3 | 0 | 3 | 0 | 6 |
| • Trojans | 7 | 10 | 0 | 3 | 20 |

- Date: November 30
- Location: Korakuen Stadium, Tokyo, Japan

Scoring summary
| 1 | ORE | MacLeod 32-yard field goal | ORE 3-0 |
| 1 | USC | Knight 2-yard run (Shafer kick) | USC 7-3 |
| 2 | USC | Shafer 32-yard field goal | USC 10-3 |
| 2 | USC | Norman 5-yard pass from Peete (Shafer kick) | USC 17-3 |
| 3 | ORE | MacLeod 36-yard field goal | USC 17-6 |
| 4 | USC | Shafer 44-yard field goal | USC 20-6 |

== Personnel ==
1985 USC Trojans football team roster
Players
Coaches
Offense

| Pos. | # | Name | Class |
|---|---|---|---|
| WR | | Gene Arrington |
| G | 79 | Jeff Bregel | Jr |
| G | 66 | Dave Cadigan | So |
| TE | | Martin Chesley |
| TE | | Joe Cormier |
| OL | | Tom Cox |
| RB | | Fred Crutcher |
| RB | | Andy Eddy |
| RB | | Aaron Emmanuel |
| OL | | James Fitzpatrick |
| TE | | Paul Green |
| OL | | John Guerrero | Fr |
| WR | | Ken Henry |
| RB | | Ryan Knight |
| OL | | Gaylord Kuamoo |
| RB | 34 | Zephrini Lee | Sr |
| TE | | Eric McKee |
| QB | | Kevin McLean |
| WR | 83 | Hank Norman | Sr |
| QB | 16 | Rodney Peete | Fr |
| RB | | Kennedy Pola |
| G | | Mark Sager |
| QB | 7 | Sean Salisbury | Sr |
| RB | | Todd Steele |
| WR | | Randy Tanner |
| WR | | Al Washington |
| RB | 25 | Steven Webster |

Defense

| Pos. | # | Name | Class |
|---|---|---|---|
| LB | | Sam Anno |
| LB | | Garrett Breeland |
| DB | 38 | Louis Brock |
| DL | | Tony Colorito |
| LB | | Marcus Cotton |
| LB | | Keith Davis |
| DB | 8 | Matt Johnson |
| DT | 91 | Matt Koart | Sr |
| S | 6 | Tim McDonald | Jr |
| DL | | Brent Moore |
| DB | 1 | Jerome Tyler | Sr |
| DL | | Gary Willison |

Special teams

| Pos. | # | Name | Class |
|---|---|---|---|
| P | | Troy Richardson |
| K | 10 | Don Shafer | Jr |
| P | | Chris Sperle |

Head coach

- Ted Tollner

Coordinators/assistant coaches

- Craig Ver Steeg (GA)

Legend

- (C) Team captain
- (S) Suspended
- (I) Ineligible
- Injured
- Redshirt

== 1986 NFL draft ==
The following players were drafted into professional football following the season.

| Player | Position | Round | Pick | Franchise |
