= Ryan Knight =

Ryan Knight may refer to:

- Ryan Knight (American football) (born c. 1966), American football running back
- Ryan Knight, American guitarist, member of music group The Black Dahlia Murder and former member of Arsis
- Ryan Knight, participant in The Real World: New Orleans
- Ryan Knight (Hollyoaks), a fictional character in the British soap opera Hollyoaks

== See also ==
- Ryan Knighton (born 1973), Canadian writer
