= 1985 Arizona Wildcats football team =

American college football season

1985 Arizona Wildcats football

Sun Bowl, T 13–13 vs. Georgia
- Conference: Pacific-10 Conference
- Record: 8–3–1 (5–2 Pac-10)
- Head coach: Larry Smith (6th season)
- Defensive coordinator: Moe Ankney (6th season)
- Home stadium: Arizona Stadium

1985 Pacific-10 Conference football standings
	Conf.					Overall
Team	W		L		T	W		L		T
No. 7 UCLA $	6	–	2	–	0	9	–	2	–	1
Arizona	5	–	2	–	0	8	–	3	–	1
Arizona State	5	–	2	–	0	8	–	4	–	0
Washington	5	–	3	–	0	7	–	5	–	0
USC	5	–	3	–	0	6	–	6	–	0
Oregon	3	–	4	–	0	5	–	6	–	0
Washington State	3	–	5	–	0	4	–	7	–	0
Stanford	3	–	5	–	0	4	–	7	–	0
Oregon State	2	–	6	–	0	3	–	8	–	0
California	2	–	7	–	0	4	–	7	–	0
$ – Conference champion; Rankings from AP Poll

The 1985 Arizona Wildcats football team represented the University of Arizona in the Pacific-10 Conference (Pac-10) during the 1985 NCAA Division I-A football season. In their sixth season under head coach Larry Smith, the Wildcats compiled an 8–3–1 record (5–2 against Pac-10 opponents), finished in a tie for second place in the Pac-10, tied with Georgia in the 1985 Sun Bowl, and outscored their opponents, 252 to 146. The defense gave up an average of 12.2 points per game, the sixth best average in Division I-A. The team played its home games in Arizona Stadium in Tucson, Arizona.

Arizona was eligible for a bowl game this season, as their postseason ban was lifted following NCAA sanctions that were received in 1983 as a result of recruiting violations. However, they were still on probation and were barred from having games aired live on television.

Major highlights of the season included an upset victory over SMU, who was ranked third at the time, and a road win at rival Arizona State. The Wildcats ultimately appeared in a bowl game, tying Georgia in the Sun Bowl.

The team's statistical leaders included Alfred Jenkins with 1,767 passing yards, David Adams with 511 rushing yards, and Jon Horton with 685 receiving yards. Linebacker Byron Evans led the team with 196 total tackles.

== Before the season ==
The Wildcats concluded the 1984 season with a 7–4 record (5–2 in Pac-10). Due to NCAA violations, the team was ineligible for a bowl game (as was in 1983) and got banned from both playing on live television and being in the rankings. The bowl ban was lifted prior to the 1985 season, though the TV ban continued as well as the ban from the rankings, regardless of how many games Arizona would win during the year. The Wildcats entered the season with hope that they would finish with a winning record.

== Schedule ==
Date	Time	Opponent	Site	TV	Result	Attendance	Source
September 7	7:00 p.m.	Toledo*	Arizona Stadium; Tucson, AZ		W 23–10	44,691	
September 14	7:00 p.m.	Washington State	Arizona Stadium; Tucson, AZ		W 12–7	46,437	
September 21	1:00 p.m.	at California	California Memorial Stadium; Berkeley, CA		W 23–17	39,500	
September 28	7:00 p.m.	Colorado*	Arizona Stadium; Tucson, AZ		L 13–14	45,503	
October 5	7:00 p.m.	No. 3 SMU*	Arizona Stadium; Tucson, AZ		W 28–6	52,114	
October 19	7:00 p.m.	San Jose State*	Arizona Stadium; Tucson, AZ		W 41–0	45,361	
October 26	7:30 p.m.	at Stanford	Stanford Stadium; Stanford, CA		L 17–28	40,000	
November 2	1:30 p.m.	at Oregon State	Parker Stadium; Corvallis, OR		W 27–6	21,384	
November 9	6:00 p.m.	No. 14 UCLA^{†}	Arizona Stadium; Tucson, AZ		L 19–24	57,779	
November 16	4:00 p.m.	Oregon	Arizona Stadium; Tucson, AZ		W 20–8	35,292	
November 23	7:30 p.m.	at Arizona State	Sun Devil Stadium; Tempe, AZ (rivalry)		W 16–13	66,849	
December 28	12:00 p.m.	vs. Georgia*	Sun Bowl; El Paso, TX (Sun Bowl)	CBS	T 13–13	52,203	
*Non-conference game; ^{†}Homecoming; Rankings from AP Poll released prior to the game

== Game summaries ==
=== Toledo ===
In their home opener against Toledo, Arizona started where they left from the previous season by winning in front of their home crowd. It was the first-ever meeting between the Wildcats and Rockets.

=== SMU ===
At home against third-ranked SMU, the Wildcats dominated the Mustangs in an upset that shocked the college football world in front of a packed Arizona Stadium crowd. Two years later, SMU would be punished with death penalty in the wake of a massive slush fund scandal that would damage their program. It was the first time since 1938 that Arizona and SMU met on the field (the Mustangs won the 1938 meeting).

=== UCLA ===
On homecoming weekend, the Wildcats hosted UCLA. The Bruins started hot early and led most of the game until Arizona rallied back to get within a score. The Wildcats threatened to take the lead in the final minute. However, the Bruins forced a turnover on downs to seal the win.

=== Arizona State ===
The Wildcats went on the road to face Arizona State in the annual rivalry game. Arizona seemed to run out of luck when the Sun Devils led 13–3 at one point before the Wildcats stormed back. ASU fumbled during a punt return that Arizona recovered for a touchdown. In the fourth quarter, Max Zendejas kicked a school-record tying 57-yard field goal with 5:29 left to tie the game and then kicked a 32-yard field goal with 1:43 left to give Arizona the lead. ASU had a final chance, but the Wildcats forced an interception and Arizona escaped with the win and their fourth consecutive over the Devils.

This was the second time in four seasons that the Wildcats denied Arizona State a shot at the Rose Bowl, with the first occurring in 1982 (ASU had to defeat or tie Arizona to clinch a spot in the bowl).

=== Georgia (Sun Bowl) ===
Arizona, now bowl-eligible, played in the Sun Bowl, and faced Georgia in the teams’ first meeting against each other. Both the Wildcats and Bulldogs were tied 13–13 when both teams missed field goals in the fourth quarter, with Zendejas’ potential winning kick sailing wide in the final seconds, which led to the game ending in a tie. This was the Wildcats first and only tie in their bowl game history, as none of their future bowl games played between 1986 and 1994 ended in ties (the NCAA eliminated ties for overtime periods that began with the 1995 bowl season).

== Season notes ==
- Arizona's win total increased yet again under Smith, with eight victories.
- This was the first known season in which a midfield logo was used on the Arizona Stadium field. The logo featured a red and blue swirl and referenced the university's centennial anniversary (Arizona was founded in 1885).
- The Wildcats played Toledo for the first time. They would play them again the future (2008, 2010, and 2012, with the latter two being season openers).
- The win over SMU was their first win over them and the last matchup to date, with the SMU scandal likely prevented any future meetings.
- Arizona's loss to UCLA may have cost the Wildcats a potential shot at the Rose Bowl. The Bruins went on to finish first in the Pac-10 and punched their ticket to the bowl game.
- The win over Arizona State was the Wildcats’ fourth straight over them, which was the longest winning streak for Arizona over ASU since they won eleven in a row from 1932 to 1948. Also, Smith referred to the victory as one of the biggest as Arizona coach.
- The Sun Bowl was the only Arizona game of the season that was broadcast live on television, as the TV ban was limited to the regular season. Arizona had its home games (and the road game against ASU) aired on a tape delay during the season as a result of the ban. In addition, the Sun Bowl was the first Arizona game that broadcast live for the first time since 1983.
- The tie against Georgia in the Sun Bowl was Arizona's first tie in a bowl game in school history, and will forever be the only one as ties were outlawed after the 1995 regular season (see above).
- Despite missing the potential winning field goal that led the Sun Bowl to end in a tie, Zendenjas ended a remarkable college career, as he made memorable field goals that won games, including those against Notre Dame in 1982 and ASU in 1983 and this season. Many ASU fans referred to him as “ASU’s top villain” and the “most hated man in Tempe” after his winning kicks led to heartbreaking losses for the Sun Devils, and Zendejas was known to Wildcat fans as “Mad Max” and the “Sun Devil killer” and the best kicker in team history. Also, he was the first known Arizona kicker in the modern era to finish a perfect 4–0 against Arizona State.

== After the season ==
Arizona’s finish to the 1985 season would continue to lead to an improvement for the Wildcats and set the stage for a remarkable 1986 season which would see Arizona in contention for the Pac-10 title. The team would ultimately finish with yet another winning record and a victory in the postseason for the first time in school history. Smith would depart as the Wildcats’ coach after the season.

== Personnel ==
1985 Arizona Wildcats football team roster
Players
Coaches
Offense

Pos.	#	Name	Class
QB	1	Alfred Jenkins	Jr
RB	2	David Adams	Jr
RB	20	Chris McLemore	Jr
WR	82	Derek Hill	Fr

Defense

Pos.	#	Name	Class
S	6	Chuck Cecil	So
CB	27	Martin Rudolph	Jr
DL	37	Dana Wells	Fr
LB	48	Byron Evans	Jr
DT	97	George Hinkle	So

Special teams

Pos.	#	Name	Class
P	8	Ruben Rodriguez	Jr
K	13	Max Zendejas	Sr

Head coach

- Larry Smith

Coordinators/assistant coaches

- Tom Roggeman

Legend

- (C) Team captain
- (S) Suspended
- (I) Ineligible
- Injured
- Redshirt
