= Tautalatasi =

Tautalatasi can be both a given name and a surname. Notable people with the name include:

- Tautalatasi Tasi (born 1994), New Zealand rugby union player
- Junior Tautalatasi (born 1962), American football running back
