= 1985 California Golden Bears football team =

American college football season

1985 California Golden Bears football
- Conference: Pacific-10 Conference
- Record: 4–7 (2–7 Pac-10)
- Head coach: Joe Kapp (4th season)
- Home stadium: California Memorial Stadium

1985 Pacific-10 Conference football standings
	Conf.					Overall
Team	W		L		T	W		L		T
No. 7 UCLA $	6	–	2	–	0	9	–	2	–	1
Arizona	5	–	2	–	0	8	–	3	–	1
Arizona State	5	–	2	–	0	8	–	4	–	0
Washington	5	–	3	–	0	7	–	5	–	0
USC	5	–	3	–	0	6	–	6	–	0
Oregon	3	–	4	–	0	5	–	6	–	0
Washington State	3	–	5	–	0	4	–	7	–	0
Stanford	3	–	5	–	0	4	–	7	–	0
Oregon State	2	–	6	–	0	3	–	8	–	0
California	2	–	7	–	0	4	–	7	–	0
$ – Conference champion; Rankings from AP Poll

The 1985 California Golden Bears football team was an American football team that represented the University of California, Berkeley in the Pacific-10 Conference (Pac-10) during the 1985 NCAA Division I-A football season. In their fourth year under head coach Joe Kapp, the Golden Bears compiled a 4–7 record (2–7 against Pac-10 opponents), finished in last place in the Pac-10, and were outscored by their opponents by a combined total of 265 to 233.

The team's statistical leaders included Kevin Brown with 1,447 passing yards, Ed Barbero with 586 rushing yards, and James Devers with 401 receiving yards.

== Schedule ==
Date	Opponent	Site	Result	Attendance	Source
August 31	San Jose State*	California Memorial Stadium; Berkeley, CA	W 48–21	41,500	
September 7	at Washington State	Martin Stadium; Pullman, WA	L 19–20	30,135	
September 14	at Oregon State	Civic Stadium; Portland, OR	L 20–23	21,182	
September 21	Arizona	California Memorial Stadium; Berkeley, CA	L 17–23	39,500	
October 5	at Missouri*	Faurot Field; Columbia, MO	W 39–32	46,851	
October 12	Washington	California Memorial Stadium; Berkeley, CA	L 12–28	49,000	
October 19	at Oregon	Autzen Stadium; Eugene, OR	W 27–24	27,465	
October 26	at No. 17 UCLA	Rose Bowl; Los Angeles, CA (rivalry)	L 7–34	61,530	
November 2	Arizona State	California Memorial Stadium; Berkeley, CA	L 8–30	39,500	
November 9	USC	California Memorial Stadium; Berkeley, CA	W 14–6	63,500	
November 23	at Stanford	Stanford Stadium; Stanford, CA (Big Game)	L 22–24	84,876	
*Non-conference game; Rankings from AP Poll released prior to the game

== Personnel ==
- Ed Barbero (offense)
- QB Brian Bedford
- QB Kevin Brown
- Cockett (offense)
- WR Vince Delgado
- Garner (offense)
- Hicks (offense)
- Houston (offense)
- K Rix
