= Kitrick Taylor =

American football player (born 1964)

No. 82, 49, 85, 42
- Position: Wide receiver

Personal information
- Born: July 22, 1964 (age 62); Los Angeles, California, U.S.
- Listed height: 5 ft 11 in (1.80 m)
- Listed weight: 181 lb (82 kg)

Career information
- High school: Pomona (CA)
- College: Washington State
- NFL draft: 1987: 5th round, 128th overall pick

Career history
- Kansas City Chiefs (1987–1988); Atlanta Falcons (1989)*; New England Patriots (1989); San Diego Chargers (1990–1991); Green Bay Packers (1992); Denver Broncos (1993); San Antonio Texans (1995)
- * Offseason or practice squad member only

Awards and highlights
- First-team All-Pac-10 (1985)

Career NFL statistics
- Receptions: 36
- Receiving yards: 414
- Touchdowns: 1
- Stats at Pro Football Reference

Kitrick Lavell Taylor (born July 22, 1964) is an American former professional football player. A wide receiver in the National Football League (NFL) from 1988 to 1993, Taylor is probably best known for catching Brett Favre's first ever winning touchdown pass in the NFL, a 35-yard strike with thirteen seconds remaining to defeat the Cincinnati Bengals 24–23 on September 20, 1992.

From Pomona, California, Taylor played college football at Washington State University in Pullman under head coach Jim Walden. As a junior in 1985, he was All-Pac-10 as a punt returner.

Pre-draft measurables
Height	Weight	40-yard dash	10-yard split	20-yard split	20-yard shuttle	Vertical jump	Broad jump	Bench press
5 ft 10 3/4 in (1.80 m)	178 lb (81 kg)	4.55 s	1.56 s	2.70 s	4.21 s	31.0 in (0.79 m)	10 ft 3 in (3.12 m)	2 reps
All values from NFL Combine

He was selected in the fifth round of the 1987 NFL draft by the Kansas City Chiefs.

Taylor was a wide receiver and played on special teams for the Chiefs in 1988. He played for the New England Patriots in 1989 and the San Diego Chargers in 1990 and 1991. Taylor was with the Green Bay Packers in 1992 and finished his career with the Denver Broncos in 1993. He totaled 414 receiving yards and one receiving touchdown in his six-year career.

He also had a punt return for a touchdown while playing for the Chargers in the penultimate game of the 1990 season. It was against the visiting Chiefs on December 23 from 55 yards out, which tied the game early in the fourth quarter.

== Post-playing career ==
Taylor published Behind The ‘Quiet’ Smile: The life of NFL STAR Kitrick Taylor, an autobiographical ebook, in 2023.

Taylor has been a coach at Pomona High School in Pomona, California, but is no longer. During his time coaching, he has been accused multiple times of impropriety related to underage female students. One former student alleged in a 2020 lawsuit that she had been "regularly sexually abused, touched and was pressured to engage in sexual intercourse" when she was 16 and 17 years old by Taylor and another coach; that case was settled in 2023. In another lawsuit that ended in a $35 million settlement, Taylor was accused of having verbally harassed an underage student who had been raped by another coach.
