= Joe Kelly (American football) =

American football player (born 1964)

No. 58, 57, 52, 56
- Position: Linebacker

Personal information
- Born: December 11, 1964 (age 61); Sun Valley, California, U.S.
- Listed height: 6 ft 2 in (1.88 m)
- Listed weight: 227 lb (103 kg)

Career information
- High school: Thomas Jefferson (Los Angeles, California)
- College: Washington
- NFL draft: 1986: 1st round, 11th overall pick

Career history
- Cincinnati Bengals (1986–1989); New York Jets (1990–1992); Los Angeles Raiders (1993); Los Angeles Rams (1994); Green Bay Packers (1995); Philadelphia Eagles (1996)

Awards and highlights
- First-team All-Pac-10 (1985); Washington MVP (1985)

Career NFL statistics
- Tackles: 542
- Sacks: 6
- Interceptions: 6
- Stats at Pro Football Reference

Joseph Winston Kelly Jr. (born December 11, 1964) is an American former professional football player who was a linebacker for 11 seasons in the National Football League (NFL) for six different teams. He played college football for the Washington Huskies under head coach Don James and was the team's MVP as a senior in 1985. In his junior season in 1984, the Huskies finished second in the polls after upsetting Oklahoma in the Orange Bowl.

Kelly was selected in the first round as the eleventh overall selection of the 1986 NFL draft, taken by the Cincinnati Bengals. After four seasons with Cincinnati, he played three more with the New York Jets, then one each with the Los Angeles Raiders, Los Angeles Rams, Green Bay Packers, and Philadelphia Eagles.

== See also ==
- Washington Huskies football statistical leaders
