= 1985 Stanford Cardinal football team =

American college football season

1985 Stanford Cardinal football
- Conference: Pacific-10 Conference
- Record: 4–7 (3–5 Pac-10)
- Head coach: Jack Elway (2nd season)
- Offensive scheme: West Coast
- Defensive coordinator: Dick Mannini (2nd season)
- Base defense: 4–3
- Home stadium: Stanford Stadium

1985 Pacific-10 Conference football standings
	Conf.					Overall
Team	W		L		T	W		L		T
No. 7 UCLA $	6	–	2	–	0	9	–	2	–	1
Arizona	5	–	2	–	0	8	–	3	–	1
Arizona State	5	–	2	–	0	8	–	4	–	0
Washington	5	–	3	–	0	7	–	5	–	0
USC	5	–	3	–	0	6	–	6	–	0
Oregon	3	–	4	–	0	5	–	6	–	0
Washington State	3	–	5	–	0	4	–	7	–	0
Stanford	3	–	5	–	0	4	–	7	–	0
Oregon State	2	–	6	–	0	3	–	8	–	0
California	2	–	7	–	0	4	–	7	–	0
$ – Conference champion; Rankings from AP Poll

The 1985 Stanford Cardinal football team represented Stanford University in the Pacific-10 Conference (Pac-10) during the 1985 NCAA Division I-A football season. In their second season under head coach Jack Elway, the Cardinal compiled a 4–7 record (3–5 in Pac-10, tied for seventh), and played home games on campus at Stanford Stadium in Stanford, California.

== Schedule ==
Date	Time	Opponent	Site	TV	Result	Attendance	Source
September 14		San Jose State*	Stanford Stadium; Stanford, CA (rivalry)		W 41–7	68,000	
September 21	1:00 pm	at Oregon	Autzen Stadium; Eugene, OR (rivalry)		L 28–45	33,494	
September 28	2:30 pm	Texas*	Stanford Stadium; Stanford, CA	CBS	L 34–38	53,000	
October 5		at San Diego State*	Jack Murphy Stadium; San Diego, CA		L 22–41	30,822	
October 12	1:30 pm	UCLA	Stanford Stadium; Stanford, CA (rivalry)	CBS	L 9–34	63,000	
October 19		at USC	Los Angeles Memorial Coliseum; Los Angeles, CA (rivalry)		L 6–30	56,837	
October 26		Arizona	Stanford Stadium; Stanford, CA		W 28–17	40,000	
November 2	12:30 pm	at Washington	Husky Stadium; Seattle, WA		L 0–34	58,625	
November 9	5:00 pm	Oregon State	Stanford Stadium; Stanford, CA	TBS	W 24–39	26,000	
November 16	5:00 pm	at Arizona State	Sun Devil Stadium; Tempe, AZ	TBS	L 14–21	64,003	
November 23	1:00 pm	California	Stanford Stadium; Stanford, CA (Big Game)		W 24–22	84,876	
*Non-conference game; All times are in Pacific time

== Roster ==
1985 Stanford Cardinal football team roster
Players
Coaches
Offense

Pos.	#	Name	Class
OT		John Barnes	Sr
TE		Greg Baty	Sr
OT		Robbie Coffin	So
WR		Henry Green	So
TB		Thomas Henley	Jr
WR		Jeff James	Jr
C		Kurt Josephson	Sr
OT		Jeff Marchin	So
WR		Carl Morris	So
FB	25	Brad Muster	Jr
OL		Tom Nye	Sr
QB	14	John Paye	Jr
TB		Kevin Scott	Jr
OL		Andy Sinclair	So

Defense

Pos.	#	Name	Class
OLB		Kurt Colehower	Jr
CB		Toi Cook	Jr
ILB		Jack Gilmete	Sr
CB		Walt Harris	Sr
FS		Mark Hashimoto	Sr
DB		Brad Humphreys	So
DT		Tony Leiker	Jr
DT		Joe Lortie	Jr
OLB		Tom Prukop	Sr
DT		Sean Scheller	Jr
ILB		Matt Soderlund	Sr
SS		Sam Sutherland	So
NG		Eric Volta	So
ILB	92	Dave Wyman (injured)	Sr

Special teams

Pos.	#	Name	Class
P		Doug Robison
K		David Sweeney

Head coach

- Jack Elway (2nd year)

Coordinators/assistant coaches

- Jimmy Walsh – Running back
- Dave Baldwin – Wide receiver
- Otto Kofler – Tight end
- Tony Yelovich – Offensive line
- Dick Mannini – Defensive Coordinator & secondary
- Tony Samuel – Defensive line
- Larry Kerr – Inside linebacker & special teams
- Sonny Lubick – Outside linebacker

Legend

- (C) Team captain
- (S) Suspended
- (I) Ineligible
- Injured
- Redshirt
