= 1985 Oregon Ducks football team =

American college football season

1985 Oregon Ducks football
- Conference: Pacific-10 Conference
- Record: 5–6 (3–4 Pac-10)
- Head coach: Rich Brooks (9th season)
- Offensive coordinator: Bob Toledo (3rd season)
- Offensive scheme: I formation
- Defensive coordinator: Joe Schaffeld (3rd season)
- Base defense: 4–3
- Captain: Lew Barnes
- Home stadium: Autzen Stadium

1985 Pacific-10 Conference football standings
	Conf.					Overall
Team	W		L		T	W		L		T
No. 7 UCLA $	6	–	2	–	0	9	–	2	–	1
Arizona	5	–	2	–	0	8	–	3	–	1
Arizona State	5	–	2	–	0	8	–	4	–	0
Washington	5	–	3	–	0	7	–	5	–	0
USC	5	–	3	–	0	6	–	6	–	0
Oregon	3	–	4	–	0	5	–	6	–	0
Washington State	3	–	5	–	0	4	–	7	–	0
Stanford	3	–	5	–	0	4	–	7	–	0
Oregon State	2	–	6	–	0	3	–	8	–	0
California	2	–	7	–	0	4	–	7	–	0
$ – Conference champion; Rankings from AP Poll

The 1985 Oregon Ducks football team represented the University of Oregon in the 1985 NCAA Division I-A football season. Playing as a member of the Pacific-10 Conference (Pac-10), the team was led by head coach Rich Brooks, in his ninth year, and played their home games at Autzen Stadium in Eugene, Oregon. They finished the season with a record of five wins and six losses (5–6 overall, 3–4 in the Pac-10).

== Schedule ==
Date	Time	Opponent	Site	TV	Result	Attendance	Source
August 31	5:00 pm	at Washington State	Martin Stadium; Pullman, WA	TBS	W 42–39	25,900	
September 14	12:30 pm	at Colorado*	Folsom Field; Boulder, CO		L 17–21	30,373	
September 21	1:00 pm	Stanford	Autzen Stadium; Eugene, OR (rivalry)		W 45–28	33,494	
September 28	11:30 am	at No. 16 Nebraska*	Memorial Stadium; Lincoln, NE		L 0–63	75,947	
October 5	1:00 pm	Washington	Autzen Stadium; Eugene, OR (rivalry)		L 13–19	44,383	
October 19	1:00 pm	California	Autzen Stadium; Eugene, OR		L 24–27	27,465	
October 26	7:00 pm	at San Diego State*	Jack Murphy Stadium; San Diego, CA		W 49–37	15,432	
November 2	1:00 pm	San Jose State*	Autzen Stadium; Eugene, OR		W 35–13	25,501	
November 16	5:30 pm	at Arizona	Arizona Stadium; Tucson, AZ		L 8–20	35,292	
November 23	1:00 pm	Oregon State	Autzen Stadium; Eugene, OR (Civil War)		W 34–13	41,805	
November 30	9:00 pm	vs. USC	Olympic Memorial Stadium; Tokyo, Japan (Mirage Bowl, rivalry)		L 6–20	65,000	
*Non-conference game; Rankings from AP Poll released prior to the game; All times are in Pacific time

== Game summaries ==
=== At Nebraska ===
Oregon at Nebraska

Team	1	2	3	4	Total
Ducks	0	0	0	0	0
• No. 16 Cornhuskers	14	28	14	7	63

- Date: 1985-09-28
- Location: Memorial Stadium, Lincoln, Nebraska
- Game attendance: 75,947

Scoring summary
1	6:08	NEB	Rathman 1-yard run (Klein kick)	NEB 7-0
1	1:04	NEB	Kaelin 3-yard run (Klein kick)	NEB 14-0
2	7:32	NEB	Turner 1-yard run (Klein kick)	NEB 21-0
2	6:28	NEB	Miles 46-yard run (Klein kick)	NEB 28-0
2	3:17	NEB	Jones 25-yard run (Klein kick)	NEB 35-0
2	0:41	NEB	Miles 1-yard run (Klein kick)	NEB 42-0
3	10:58	NEB	Sheppard 8-yard run (Klein kick)	NEB 49-0
3	4:15	NEB	Sheppard 27-yard run (Klein kick)	NEB 56-0
4	9:54	NEB	Casterline 4-yard run (Cheloha kick)	NEB 63-0

=== Vs. USC ===
Oregon vs. USC

Team	1	2	3	4	Total
Ducks	3	0	3	0	6
• Trojans	7	10	0	3	20

- Date: November 30
- Location: Korakuen Stadium, Tokyo, Japan

Scoring summary
1	ORE	MacLeod 32-yard field goal	ORE 3-0
1	USC	Knight 2-yard run (Shafer kick)	USC 7-3
2	USC	Shafer 32-yard field goal	USC 10-3
2	USC	Norman 5-yard pass from Peete (Shafer kick)	USC 17-3
3	ORE	MacLeod 36-yard field goal	USC 17-6
4	USC	Shafer 44-yard field goal	USC 20-6

== NFL draft ==
Three Ducks were selected in the 1986 NFL draft, which lasted twelve rounds (335 selections).

Player	Position	Round	Pick	Franchise
Lew Barnes	Wide receiver	5	138	Chicago Bears
Tony Cherry	Running back	9	240	San Francisco 49ers
Drew Smetana	Tackle	11	298	San Diego Chargers
