= 1985 Sun Bowl =

American college football game

Georgia Bulldogs	Arizona Wildcats
(7–3–1)	(8–3)
SEC	Pac-10
13	13
Head coach: Vince Dooley	Head coach: Larry Smith
	Coaches 20
	1	2	3	4	Total
Georgia	0	3	0	10	13
Arizona	0	3	10	0	13
- Date: December 28, 1985
- Season: 1985
- Stadium: Sun Bowl
- Location: El Paso, Texas
- MVP: K Max Zendejas (Arizona)
- Referee: John Laurie (Big Eight)
- Attendance: 52,203

United States TV coverage
- Network: CBS
- Announcers: Gary Bender; Steve Davis; Pat Haden

The 1985 Sun Bowl was a college football postseason bowl game between the Georgia Bulldogs and the Arizona Wildcats.

== Background ==
The Bulldogs finished 5th in the Southeastern Conference in their sixth straight bowl season and first Sun Bowl since 1969. The Wildcats finished tied for 2nd in the Pacific-10 Conference in their first bowl appearance since 1979 and first Sun Bowl since 1968.

== Game summary ==
Steve Crumley gave Georgia a 3–0 lead on his 37-yard field goal, though he re-injured a pulled muscle in his leg, keeping him out the rest of the game. Max Zendejas tied it on a 21-yard field goal to make it 3–3. Less than five minutes into the second half, Zendejas made it 6–3 on a field goal from 51 yards out. Martin Rudolph returned an interception 35 yards for a touchdown to make it 13–6. Backup Davis Jacobs made it 13–6 on his 44-yard field goal with 13:20 left. Running back James Debow fumbled the ball at the 23 to give the ball back to the Bulldogs with 12:35 remaining. Georgia would score three minutes later on a Lars Tate touchdown run. With 1:14 remaining, Jacobs missed a field goal from 44 yards to keep it 13–13. The Wildcats drove to the 22, calling timeout to set up a 39-yard attempt by Zendejas. However, his kick went wide, keeping the game a tie. Despite this, he was named MVP. This remains the final tie in Sun Bowl history (since 1996, games cannot end in a tie). Alfred Jenkins went 13-of-22 for 133 yards for Arizona. Tate went 71 yards on 22 carries for Georgia. Zendejas was named MVP on his 2 for 3 success in attempting field goals.

== Aftermath ==
The Wildcats went to the Aloha Bowl the following year, in Smith's last season with the team. Neither team has been to the Sun Bowl since this game.

== Statistics ==
Statistics	Arizona	Georgia
First downs	11	18
Rushing yards	99	211
Passing yards	133	51
Total yards	232	262
Interceptions	0	2
Fumbles–lost	2–2	1–1
Punts–average	4–40.0	2–27.5
Penalties–penalty yards	7–50	4–20
