= Erik Howard =

American football player (born 1964)

No. 74
- Position: Defensive tackle

Personal information
- Born: November 12, 1964 (age 61); Pittsfield, Massachusetts, U.S.
- Listed height: 6 ft 4 in (1.93 m)
- Listed weight: 268 lb (122 kg)

Career information
- High school: Bellarmine Prep (San Jose, California)
- College: Washington State
- NFL draft: 1986: 2nd round, 46th overall pick

Career history
- New York Giants (1986–1994); New York Jets (1995–1996)

Awards and highlights
- 2× Super Bowl champion (XXI, XXV); Pro Bowl (1990); 94th greatest New York Giant of all-time; Morris Trophy (1985); First-team All-Pac-10 (1985)

Career NFL statistics
- Games: 139
- Sacks: 33
- Safeties: 1
- Stats at Pro Football Reference

Erik Matthew Howard (born November 12, 1964) is an American former professional football player who was a defensive tackle for 11 seasons in the National Football League (NFL). He played nine seasons with the New York Giants, and was a member of the teams that won Super Bowls XXI and XXV.

== Early life ==
Howard graduated from Bellarmine Prep in San Jose, California, and played college football for the Washington State Cougars in Pullman under head coach Jim Walden. He was All-Pac-10 as a senior in 1985.

== Professional career ==
Howard was selected by the Giants in the second round of the 1986 NFL draft, 46th overall.

In the 1990 NFC Championship game against the two-time defending NFL champion San Francisco 49ers, Howard came up with one of the biggest plays of the 1990 season and arguably the biggest play in Giants history. With just under three minutes left in the game, the Giants trailed 13–12, and the 49ers had the game nearly wrapped up when Howard fought through a double-team block by 49ers' Guard Guy McIntyre and Center Jesse Sapolu to force running back Roger Craig to fumble the football after getting his helmet on the ball. Teammate Lawrence Taylor fought through two blocks by 49ers' TE Brent Jones and RB Tom Rathman to get to the spot along the line of scrimmage where Craig was located to recover the fumble as the ball was forced out of Craig's grasp. The Giants went on to win the game on Matt Bahr's field goal, kicked with four seconds remaining to end the 49ers' bid for a three-peat. The Giants went on to win Super Bowl XXV over the Buffalo Bills seven days later.

After the 1994 season, Howard signed with the New York Jets as a free agent and played with them for two years before deciding to retire. He currently resides in Marshall, Texas, with his wife Jennifer Howard and three children Jackson Howard, Katelynn Howard, and Keaton Howard.
