= Jim Walden (American football) =

American football player and coach (1938–2026)

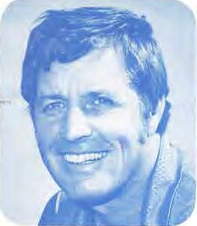
- Walden in 1976

Biographical details
- Born: April 10, 1938; Aberdeen, Mississippi, U.S.
- Died: July 2, 2026 (aged 88); Coeur d'Alene, Idaho, U.S.

Playing career
- 1958–1959: Wyoming
- 1960–1961: BC Lions
- 1961–1962: Calgary Stampeders
- 1962: Edmonton Eskimos
- Position: Quarterback

Coaching career (HC unless noted)
- 1964–1968: Amory HS (MS)
- 1969–1970: Nebraska (GA)
- 1971–1972: Nebraska (assistant)
- 1973–1974: Miami (FL) (off. backfield)
- 1975–1976: Miami (FL) (DC)
- 1977: Washington State (off. backfield)
- 1978–1986: Washington State
- 1987–1994: Iowa State

Head coaching record
- Overall: 72–109–7 (college)
- Bowls: 0–1

Accomplishments and honors

Awards
- 2× Pac-10 Coach of the Year (1981, 1983)

Jim Walden (April 10, 1938 – July 2, 2026) was an American football player and coach. He served as the head football coach at Washington State University from 1978 to 1986 and Iowa State University from 1987 to 1994, compiling a career college football head coaching record of 72–109–7 (.402) over 17 seasons. Walden played collegiately as a quarterback at the University of Wyoming and professionally in the Canadian Football League (CFL) with the BC Lions, Calgary Stampeders, and Edmonton Eskimos.

== Playing career ==
Born and raised in Aberdeen, Mississippi, Walden played quarterback at Itawamba Junior College in Fulton and then for head coach Bob Devaney at the University of Wyoming in Laramie. Walden led the Cowboys to consecutive Skyline Conference titles and was the league's player of the year as a senior in 1959.

Selected late in the 1960 NFL draft by the Cleveland Browns of the NFL, Walden was also taken by the Denver Broncos in the first AFL draft. Offered more money by the BC Lions of the Canadian Football League (CFL), he played several seasons in Canada as a backup quarterback.

== Coaching career ==
Walden began his coaching career in 1964 when was hired as the head football coach at Amory High School in Amory, Mississippi. He moved up to college level in 1969 on Bob Devaney's staff at the University of Nebraska–Lincoln, where he assisted on consecutive national championship teams in 1970 and 1971. After the 1972 season, Devaney retired and Walden then coached for four seasons at the University of Miami under Pete Elliott and fellow Devaney assistant, Carl Selmer.

=== Washington State ===
Walden followed Warren Powers, another Devaney assistant, to Washington State University in Pullman as offensive backfield coach in 1977 and when Powers left for the University of Missouri after the season, Walden succeeded him as head coach of the Cougars. He was the head coach at WSU from 1978 through 1986, compiling a 44–52–3 (.460) record in nine seasons and coached some of the greatest players in school history, including Jack Thompson, Rueben Mayes, Kerry Porter, Ricky Reynolds, Paul Sorensen, Pat Beach, Brian Forde, Lee Blakeney, Mark Rypien, Dan Lynch, Keith Millard, and Erik Howard.

In his fourth season in 1981, Walden led the 8–2–1 Cougars to the Holiday Bowl, the school's first bowl appearance in 51 years, where they lost a 38–36 donnybrook to BYU, quarterbacked by Jim McMahon. That season, Walden was selected as the Pac-10 Coach of the Year. In 1985, WSU won their third Apple Cup in four seasons, a feat they have accomplished only two other times (in 1954 and 2007).

Prior to the 1985 Apple Cup, in which the Washington Huskies were favored, Husky coach Don James jovially contrasted himself to Walden by quipping, "I'm a 2,000-word underdog."

Following a 3–7–1 season in 1986, Walden left in mid-December to become the 28th head coach for Iowa State, and Dennis Erickson became the Cougars' next head coach.

=== Iowa State ===
Walden succeeded Jim Criner at Iowa State, where he compiled a 28–57–3 (.335) record over eight seasons. ISU had been hit with scholarship reductions by the NCAA, both because of infractions by the previous coach, and an overall reduction in scholarships for Division I-A for the 1988 season. In his first four years as Iowa State's head coach, he had just 57, 61, 63, and 67 scholarship players. Walden had 47 scholarship players on his 1989 squad that he brought to Lincoln to play Nebraska on October 28. They lost 49–17.

Prior to Matt Campbell defeating Oklahoma on October 7, 2017, Walden was the last Iowa State coach to defeat Oklahoma, which they did on October 20, 1990. Oklahoma was ranked 16th in the nation at the time. They had narrowly missed an upset the year before, losing in Ames 43–40. His best record with the Cyclones was 6–5 in 1989. After the 1989 season, Walden was offered a head coaching job at the University of Arizona, but he declined the job, citing a number of people at Iowa State telling him it would be "devastating" if he left. In retrospect, Walden said he was "too dumb" to leave.

Walden's teams were plagued with injuries, especially at quarterback. In 1991, third-string quarterback Kevin Caldwell started the final five games of the season; he began the season as a tailback. Walden played four quarterbacks in a 41–0 loss to Kansas in 1991. In 1992, Walden installed the triple-option offense and had mixed results. Iowa State lost to in-state rivals Iowa and UNI early in the 1992 season. The loss to UNI was the first loss by Jim Walden to a Division 1AA school. It was also UNI's first victory over the Cyclones since 1900. Iowa State bounced back to shock the seventh ranked Nebraska Cornhuskers at home on November 14, 1992. The victory was even more improbable because Walden was starting his third-string quarterback, Marv Seiler, for the first time. Walden's 1993 squad went 3–8, but with an upset of 18th ranked Kansas State. Walden ended the 1993 campaign starting a walk-on quarterback, Jeff St. Clair.

In the spring of 1994, Walden secured star running back Troy Davis from Florida. Davis later had consecutive 2,000-yard rushing seasons, but it was after Walden's departure.

After starting the 1994 campaign 0–2, many fans began to criticize his coaching ability. He began his weekly press conference by handing out the records of Dennis Erickson, Johnny Majors, and Earle Bruce while they were at Washington State and Iowa State. He then handed out Iowa State's overall record in football since fielding its first team in 1892, which, at the time, was 423–461–45—a .480 percentage, and compared his record to that one. Walden claimed that he was as good a coach or better than Erickson, Majors, and Bruce. The difference was, according to Walden, they left for better schools while he stayed at Iowa State.

On November 3, 1994, after starting the season 0–7–1, Walden informed his team that he would resign at season's end. He was allowed to coach his final three games by the university, but banned from coaching his last game at Colorado because of criticizing the officials after the Kansas State game. Kansas State's Nyle Wiren had body-slammed Walden's quarterback Todd Doxzon into the turf head first. Nothing was called and Walden, with nothing to lose, went off on the officiating after the game:

"I've kept quiet too long, but since I'm leaving there's nothing they can do about me. I think the refereeing in this league is atrocious. . . What do you do with bad officials? Do they get fired? You fire bad players and bad coaches. Bad officials get a raise and go fishing."

Walden coached his final game on November 12 against the Nebraska Cornhuskers in Ames. Iowa State had an 0–8–1 record and Nebraska was undefeated, with a number one ranking. Unbelievably Walden's Cyclones hung with the Huskers. At the end of the third quarter, Nebraska led by only two points, 14–12. The final quarter proved to be too much for Walden's team, and Nebraska won the game 28–12.

The Cyclones finished with a winless 0–10–1 record in 1994. Walden ranks sixth at Iowa State in total wins and 22nd winning percentage.

Walden made an ominous statement about coaches who stay at Iowa State:

"If you stay [at Iowa State], you're going to lose and you're going to get fired. That's very evident."

== Later life and death ==
After retiring from Iowa State, Walden served as a radio color commentator, first for the Iowa Barnstormers of the Arena Football League and later back in Pullman for Washington State. He hosted a Sunday evening radio show in Iowa on WHO called "Two Guys Named Jim". In the final regular season Harris Interactive Poll in 2006, he was the only voter to have Florida at No. 1; the other 112 No. 1 votes went to Ohio State. Florida handily defeated Ohio State 41–14 in the BCS National Championship Game on January 8, 2007.

Walden lost his wife, Janice. after a long battle with cancer on November 13, 2005. After meeting at the University of Wyoming in 1958. the couple married in the spring of 1960. They had three children: two daughters, Lisa (born in 1961) and Emily (1965), and one son, Murray (1967).

Walden died from respiratory failure at a hospital in Coeur d'Alene, Idaho, on July 2, 2026, at the age of 88.

== Head coaching record ==
=== College ===
Year	Team	Overall	Conference	Standing	Bowl/playoffs
Washington State Cougars (Pacific-10 Conference) (1978–1986)
1978	Washington State	4–6–1	2–6	10th	
1979	Washington State	5–6	2–6	9th	
1980	Washington State	4–7	3–4	T–7th	
1981	Washington State	8–3–1	5–2–1	T–4th	L Holiday
1982	Washington State	3–7–1	2–4–1	8th	
1983	Washington State	7–4	5–3	3rd	
1984	Washington State	6–5	4–3	5th	
1985	Washington State	4–7	3–5	T–7th	
1986	Washington State	3–7–1	2–6–1	8th	
Washington State:		44–52–4	28–39–3		
Iowa State Cyclones (Big Eight Conference) (1987–1994)
1987	Iowa State	3–8	2–5	6th	
1988	Iowa State	5–6	3–4	5th	
1989	Iowa State	6–5	4–3	4th	
1990	Iowa State	4–6–1	2–4–1	T–4th	
1991	Iowa State	3–7–1	1–5–1	6th	
1992	Iowa State	4–7	2–5	T–6th	
1993	Iowa State	3–8	2–5	T–6th	
1994	Iowa State	0–10–1	0–6–1	T–7th	
Iowa State:		28–57–3	16–37–3		
Total:		72–109–7			
