= Junior Tautalatasi =

American football player (born 1962)

No. 25, 37
- Position: Running back

Personal information
- Born: March 24, 1962 (age 64); Oakland, California, U.S.
- Listed height: 5 ft 10 in (1.78 m)
- Listed weight: 207 lb (94 kg)

Career information
- High school: Encinal (Alameda, California)
- College: Washington State
- NFL draft: 1986: 10th round, 261st overall pick

Career history
- Philadelphia Eagles (1986–1988); Dallas Cowboys (1989)

Career NFL statistics
- Rushing yards: 275
- Rushing average: 2.8
- Receptions: 88
- Receiving yards: 706
- Total touchdowns: 2
- Stats at Pro Football Reference

Taivale "Junior" Tautalatasi Jr. (born March 24, 1962) is an American former professional football player who was a running back in the National Football League (NFL). He played college football for the Washington State Cougars and was selected in the 10th round of the 1986 NFL draft. He played in the NFL for the Philadelphia Eagles and Dallas Cowboys.

== Early life ==
Born in Oakland, California to a Samoan American family, Tautalatasi graduated from Encinal High School in nearby Alameda in 1981. After high school, he began his college football career at Chabot College, a junior college in Hayward where he would play in the 1981 and 1982 seasons.

He then transferred to Washington State University. After redshirting the 1983 season, he played in 1984 and 1985 with the Washington State Cougars, while playing behind Rueben Mayes (conference rushing leader) and Kerry Porter. With Washington State, Tautalatasi rushed for 402 yards and four touchdowns, averaging 6.3 yards per carry.

== Professional career ==
=== Philadelphia Eagles ===
Tautalatasi was selected by the Philadelphia Eagles in the tenth round (261st overall) of the 1986 NFL draft. He made the team after showing big play potential in the preseason. He appeared in all 16 games as the team's third down back and started 2 games, including the season opener, while Keith Byars was recovering from a foot injury. Although he was slowed down by a right knee injury, he finished with 41 receptions (second on the team) for 325 receiving yards (fourth on the team) and 51 carries for 163 rushing yards. He had 11 receptions in the tenth game against the New York Giants. He recorded a 50-yard run in the seventh game against the Dallas Cowboys. He made a 56-yard reception in the fifth game against the Atlanta Falcons.

Buddy Ryan, Tautalatasi's head coach with the Eagles, was unable to pronounce his last name and referred to him most often as "Junior Smith". In 1987, he posted 25 receptions for 176 yards and 26 carries for 69 yards. On November 9, 1988, he was waived to make room for running back Walter Abercrombie. Tautalatasi concluded the 1988 season with 48 receiving and 28 rushing yards.

=== Dallas Cowboys ===
On September 26, 1989, he was signed by the Dallas Cowboys as a free agent. A backup running back, Tautalatasi had 157 receiving yards and 15 rushing yards in six games. He was released on August 26, 1990.
