= Robert Jenkins (American football) =

American football player (born 1963)

No. 72, 64
- Position: Offensive tackle

Personal information
- Born: December 30, 1963 (age 62); San Francisco, California, U.S.
- Listed height: 6 ft 5 in (1.96 m)
- Listed weight: 295 lb (134 kg)

Career information
- High school: Dublin (Dublin, California)
- College: UCLA
- NFL draft: 1986: 6th round, 144th overall pick

Career history
- Los Angeles Rams (1986–1993); Los Angeles/Oakland Raiders (1994–1996)

Career NFL statistics
- Games played: 117
- Games started: 34
- Stats at Pro Football Reference

Robert Lloyd Jenkins (né Cox; born December 30, 1963) is an American former professional football player who was an offensive lineman in the National Football League (NFL) for the Los Angeles Rams, Los Angeles Raiders and Oakland Raiders. He played college football for the UCLA Bruins and was selected by the Rams in the sixth round of the 1986 NFL draft with the 144th overall pick.
