= Dana Wells =

American football player (born 1966)

No. 79
- Position: Nose tackle

Personal information
- Born: August 5, 1966 (age 60); Phoenix, Arizona, U.S.
- Listed height: 6 ft 0 in (1.83 m)
- Listed weight: 272 lb (123 kg)

Career information
- High school: Brophy College Preparatory (Phoenix)
- College: Arizona
- NFL draft: 1989: 11th round, 306th overall pick

Career history
- Cincinnati Bengals (1989); Phoenix Cardinals (1990)*
- * Offseason or practice squad member only

Awards and highlights
- Pac-10 Defensive Player of the Year (1988); 2× Morris Trophy (1987, 1988); 2× First-team All-Pac-10 (1987, 1988)

Career NFL statistics
- Games played: 1
- Stats at Pro Football Reference

Dana Clemmer Wells Jr. (born August 5, 1966) is an American former professional football player who was a nose tackle in the National Football League (NFL). He played college football for the Arizona Wildcats.

== Professional career ==
He played in the National Football League (NFL) in 1989. He was selected 306th overall in the 11th round of the 1989 NFL draft by the Cincinnati Bengals.

== College career ==
Wells played college football at the University of Arizona and won the Morris Trophy two times.
