= 1985 Freedom Bowl =

- Freedom Bowl II
Colorado Buffaloes	Washington Huskies
(7–4)	(6–5)
Big Eight	Pac-10
17	20
Head coach: Bill McCartney	Head coach: Don James
	1	2	3	4	Total
Colorado	0	7	3	7	17
Washington	3	7	7	3	20
- Date: December 30, 1985
- Season: 1985
- Stadium: Anaheim Stadium
- Location: Anaheim, California
- MVP: Chris Chandler (QB, UW)
- Favorite: Washington by 4 points
- Attendance: 30,961

United States TV coverage
- Network: Lorimar Sports Network
- Announcers: Barry Tompkins and Lou Holtz

The 1985 Freedom Bowl was a college football postseason bowl game played on December 30 in Anaheim, California. It matched the Washington Huskies of the Pacific-10 Conference and the Colorado Buffaloes of the Big Eight Conference.

== Teams ==
=== Colorado ===
The Buffaloes switched to the wishbone offense in the spring and won five of their first six games; they tied for third in the Big Eight (4–3), and entered the bowl at 7–4 overall. With only one win the previous year and six consecutive losing seasons, this was Colorado's first bowl game in nine years, when they played in the Orange Bowl.

=== Washington ===
The Huskies finished fourth in the Pac-10 (5–3), but lost three of their last five games to finish the regular season with five losses. It was their seventh straight bowl game and eighth under head coach Don James. Washington had finished second in the nation the previous season after winning the Orange Bowl.

== Game summary ==
The night game kicked off shortly after 5 p.m. PST with Colorado in white jerseys and Washington in home purple. Jeff Jaeger gave the Huskies the lead late in the first quarter on a 30-yard field goal. The Buffaloes scored back on a one-yard touchdown by Anthony Weatherspoon. The Huskies scored with 30 seconds remaining in the half on a David Toy three yard touchdown run to make it 10–7 at halftime.

Colorado kicker Larry Eckel tied the game with a 33-yard field goal, but Washington scored quickly on a Tony Covington touchdown run three minutes later. An 18-yard field goal by Jaeger early in the fourth quarter made it 20–10. The Buffaloes responded later in the quarter with a drive into Washington territory, all the way to the 31. But on fourth down, the Buffaloes had to decide whether to kick a field goal or go for the first down. They sent out their punt team, led by punter Barry Helton. He took the snap and threw a 31-yard pass to tight end Jon Embree, who scored to make it 20–17 with 11:05 remaining. Colorado had one last chance with five minutes remaining deep into the Huskies' territory, but Mike Marquez fumbled the ball at the two, as Washington held on to win their second straight bowl game. With the loss, Colorado's bowl losing streak stood at four. Both teams concluded the season with 7–5 records.

== Aftermath ==
The two schools were to be paid $500,000 each to participate in this game, which almost killed the bowl due to stagnant funds after paying approximately $430,000 of the one million combined for both schools before the deadline, which had to be extended. However, the bowl president went before the Anaheim City Council and was given $250,000 in an interest-free loan to pay the schools. This was not the first money trouble the bowl had, as the first bowl game had less than marginal success and left the bowl in debt, having to use the proceeds from next year's bowl game to pay off the previous year. The loan was due to be paid in full by 1994 (with payment starting in 1992). Fittingly, the Freedom Bowl disbanded after that year. Strangely enough, Helton's pass was the longest touchdown pass in Colorado bowl history until 1991.

== Statistics ==
Statistics	Colorado	Washington
First downs	15	20
Rushes–yards	58–190	43–207
Passing yards	44	141
Passes (C–A–I)	2–10–0	15–26–1
Total offense	60–234	69–348
Punts–average	5–39	6–40
Fumbles–lost	1–1	1–0
Turnovers	1	1
Penalties–yards	4–20	13–88
Time of possession	30:22	29:38
