= Jeff Bregel =

American football player (born 1964)

No. 65
- Position: Guard

Personal information
- Born: May 1, 1964 (age 62); Redondo Beach, California, U.S.
- Listed height: 6 ft 4 in (1.93 m)
- Listed weight: 280 lb (127 kg)

Career information
- High school: Kennedy (Los Angeles, California)
- College: Southern California
- NFL draft: 1987: 2nd round, 37th overall pick

Career history
- San Francisco 49ers (1987–1989)

Awards and highlights
- 2× Super Bowl champion (XXIII, XXIV); 2× Consensus All-American (1985, 1986); Morris Trophy (1985); 2× First-team All-Pac-10 (1985, 1986); Second-team All-Pac-10 (1984)

Career NFL statistics
- Games played: 21
- Games started: 3
- Stats at Pro Football Reference

Jeffrey Bryan Bregel (born May 1, 1964) is an American former professional football player who was a guard for three seasons with the San Francisco 49ers of the National Football League (NFL) during the late 1980s.

Bregel was born in Redondo Beach, California, and played scholastically at John F. Kennedy High School in Los Angeles.

He played college football for the USC Trojans, where he was a two-time consensus All-American. As a senior, he was also an Academic All-American and the recipient of a National Football Foundation National Scholar-Athlete Award.

He was selected by the 49ers in the second round of the 1987 NFL draft, and spent his entire career with them.

Pre-draft measurables
Height	Weight	Arm length	Hand span	40-yard dash	10-yard split	20-yard split	20-yard shuttle	Vertical jump	Broad jump	Bench press
6 ft 4 1/4 in (1.94 m)	279 lb (127 kg)	31 in (0.79 m)	9 3/4 in (0.25 m)	5.40 s	1.86 s	3.13 s	4.63 s	28.5 in (0.72 m)	9 ft 0 in (2.74 m)	20 reps
All values from NFL Combine
