= 1985 Arizona State Sun Devils football team =

American college football season

1985 Arizona State Sun Devils football

Holiday Bowl, L 17–18 vs. Arkansas
- Conference: Pacific-10 Conference
- Record: 8–4 (5–2 Pac-10)
- Head coach: John Cooper (1st season)
- Offensive coordinator: Jim Colletto (1st season)
- Defensive coordinator: Larry Marmie (1st season)
- Home stadium: Sun Devil Stadium

1985 Pacific-10 Conference football standings
	Conf.					Overall
Team	W		L		T	W		L		T
No. 7 UCLA $	6	–	2	–	0	9	–	2	–	1
Arizona	5	–	2	–	0	8	–	3	–	1
Arizona State	5	–	2	–	0	8	–	4	–	0
Washington	5	–	3	–	0	7	–	5	–	0
USC	5	–	3	–	0	6	–	6	–	0
Oregon	3	–	4	–	0	5	–	6	–	0
Washington State	3	–	5	–	0	4	–	7	–	0
Stanford	3	–	5	–	0	4	–	7	–	0
Oregon State	2	–	6	–	0	3	–	8	–	0
California	2	–	7	–	0	4	–	7	–	0
$ – Conference champion; Rankings from AP Poll

The 1985 Arizona State Sun Devils football team was an American football team that represented Arizona State University as a member of the Pacific-10 Conference (Pac-10) during the 1985 NCAA Division I-A football season. In their first season under head coach John Cooper, the Sun Devils compiled an 8–4 record (5–2 against Pac-10 opponents), finished in a tie for second place in the Pac-10, and outscored their opponents by a combined total of 285 to 168.

The team's statistical leaders included Jeff Van Raaphorst with 2,200 passing yards, Mike Crawford with 684 rushing yards, Aaron Cox with 788 receiving yards.

== Schedule ==
Date	Opponent	Site	TV	Result	Attendance	Source
September 14	at Michigan State*	Spartan Stadium; East Lansing, MI		L 3–12	62,797	
September 21	Pacific (CA)*	Sun Devil Stadium; Tempe, AZ		W 27–0	59,538	
September 28	No. 18 USC	Sun Devil Stadium; Tempe, AZ		W 24–0	70,710	
October 5	at UCLA	Rose Bowl; Pasadena, CA		L 17–40	50,494	
October 12	Utah*	Sun Devil Stadium; Tempe, AZ		W 34–27	71,264	
October 19	Utah State*	Sun Devil Stadium; Tempe, AZ		W 42–10	59,543	
October 26	at Washington State	Martin Stadium; Pullman, WA		W 21–16	14,875	
November 2	at California	California Memorial Stadium; Berkeley, CA		W 30–8	39,500	
November 9	Washington	Sun Devil Stadium; Tempe, AZ		W 36–7	67,474	
November 16	Stanford	Sun Devil Stadium; Tempe, AZ		W 21–14	64,003	
November 23	Arizona	Sun Devil Stadium; Tempe, AZ (rivalry)		L 13–16	66,849	
December 22	vs. Arkansas*	Jack Murphy Stadium; San Diego, CA (Holiday Bowl)	Lorimar, USA	L 17–18	60,641	
*Non-conference game; Rankings from AP Poll released prior to the game
