= 1985 Washington Huskies football team =

American college football season

1985 Washington Huskies football

Freedom Bowl, W 20–17 vs. Colorado
- Conference: Pacific-10 Conference
- Record: 7–5 (5–3 Pac-10)
- Head coach: Don James (11th season)
- Offensive coordinator: Gary Pinkel (2nd season)
- Defensive coordinator: Jim Lambright (8th season)
- MVP: Joe Kelly
- Captains: Joe Kelly; Vestee Jackson; Hugh Millen; Dennis Soldat
- Home stadium: Husky Stadium

1985 Pacific-10 Conference football standings
	Conf.					Overall
Team	W		L		T	W		L		T
No. 7 UCLA $	6	–	2	–	0	9	–	2	–	1
Arizona	5	–	2	–	0	8	–	3	–	1
Arizona State	5	–	2	–	0	8	–	4	–	0
Washington	5	–	3	–	0	7	–	5	–	0
USC	5	–	3	–	0	6	–	6	–	0
Oregon	3	–	4	–	0	5	–	6	–	0
Washington State	3	–	5	–	0	4	–	7	–	0
Stanford	3	–	5	–	0	4	–	7	–	0
Oregon State	2	–	6	–	0	3	–	8	–	0
California	2	–	7	–	0	4	–	7	–	0
$ – Conference champion; Rankings from AP Poll

The 1985 Washington Huskies football team was an American football team that represented the University of Washington during the 1985 NCAA Division I-A football season. In its eleventh season under head coach Don James, the team compiled a 7–5 record, and outscored its opponents 238 to 225. Joe Kelly was selected for the Guy Flaherty Most Inspirational award. Kelly was also selected as the team's most valuable player. Kelly, Vestee Jackson, Hugh Millen, and Dennis Soldat were the team captains.

Senior quarterback Millen started the first nine games, and sophomore Chris Chandler the final three.

== Schedule ==
Date	Opponent	Rank	Site	Result	Attendance	Source
September 7	No. 16 Oklahoma State*	No. 12	Husky Stadium; Seattle, WA	L 17–31	60,320	
September 14	at No. 16 BYU*		Cougar Stadium; Provo, UT	L 3–31	65,476	
September 21	at Houston*		Houston Astrodome; Houston, TX	W 29–12	20,522	
September 28	No. 13 UCLA		Husky Stadium; Seattle, WA	W 21–14	60,801	
October 5	at Oregon		Autzen Stadium; Eugene, OR (rivalry)	W 19–13	44,383	
October 12	at California		California Memorial Stadium; Berkeley, CA	W 28–12	49,000	
October 19	Oregon State		Husky Stadium; Seattle, WA	L 20–21	58,771	
November 2	Stanford		Husky Stadium; Seattle, WA	W 34–0	58,625	
November 9	at Arizona State		Sun Devil Stadium; Tempe, AZ	L 7–36	67,474	
November 16	USC		Husky Stadium; Seattle, WA	W 20–17	59,417	
November 23	Washington State		Husky Stadium; Seattle, WA (Apple Cup)	L 20–21	59,887	
December 30	vs. Colorado*		Anaheim Stadium; Anaheim, CA (Freedom Bowl)	W 20–17	30,961	
*Non-conference game; Rankings from AP Poll released prior to the game

== Game summaries ==
=== UCLA ===
Team	1	2	3	4	Total
UCLA	7	7	0	0	14
• Washington	0	11	10	0	21

- Date: September 28
- Location: Husky Stadium, Seattle
- Game attendance: 60,801
- Game weather: 70 °F (21 °C)

Scoring summary
1	UCLA	Sherrard 26-yard pass from Norrie (Lee kick)	UCLA 7-0
2	WASH	Jaeger 31-yard field goal	UCLA 7-3
2	UCLA	Dorrell 26-yard pass from Norrie (Lee kick)	UCLA 14-3
2	WASH	Hill 31-yard pass from Millen (Millen to Trimble pass)	UCLA 14-11
3	WASH	Jaeger 37-yard field goal	Tied 14-14
3	WASH	Toy 1-yard run (Jaeger kick)	WASH 21-14

=== Oregon State ===
Team	1	2	3	4	Total
• Oregon State	7	7	0	7	21
Washington	3	7	7	3	20

- Date: October 19
- Location: Husky Stadium, Seattle
- Game attendance: 56,544
- Game weather: 55 °F (13 °C)

Scoring summary
1	WASH	Jaeger 28-yard field goal	WASH 3-0
1	OSU	Malone 43-yard pass from Gonzales (Nielsen kick)	OSU 7-3
2	WASH	Weathersby 2-yard run (Jaeger kick)	WASH 10-7
2	OSU	Gonzales 20-yard run (Nielsen kick)	OSU 14-10
3	WASH	Covington 14-yard run (Jaeger kick)	WASH 17-14
4	WASH	Jaeger 43-yard field goal	WASH 20-14
4	OSU	Northington recovered blocked punt in end zone (Nielsen kick)	OSU 21-20

=== Washington State ===
Team	1	2	3	4	Total
• Wash. State	7	7	0	7	21
Washington	0	6	8	6	20

- Date: November 23
- Location: Husky Stadium, Seattle
- Game attendance: 49,302
- Game weather: 25 °F (−4 °C)

Scoring summary
1	WSU	James 44-yard pass from Rypien (Traut kick)	WSU 7-0
2	WASH	Jaeger 31-yard field goal	WSU 7-3
2	WSU	Taylor 24-yard pass from Rypien (Traut kick)	WSU 14-3
2	WASH	Jaeger 38-yard field goal	WSU 14-6
3	WASH	Covington 2-yard run (Covington run)	Tied 14-14
4	WSU	Taylor 15-yard pass from Rypien (Traut kick)	WSU 21-14
4	WASH	Hill 50-yard pass from Chandler (pass failed)	WSU 21-20

== Roster ==
1985 Washington Huskies football team roster
Players
Coaches
Offense

Pos.	#	Name	Class
C	57	Dan Agen	Sr
G	78	Tim Burnham	Sr
QB	17	Chris Chandler	So
TB	39	Tony Covington	Fr
FB	30	Rick Fenney	Jr
FL	7	Darryl Franklin	So
OT	72	Kevin Gogan	Jr
WR	1	Lonzell Hill	Jr
TE	84	Rod Jones	Jr
TE	82	Scott Jones	So
QB	12	Hugh Millen (C)	Sr
OT	65	Dennis Soldat (C)	Sr
OT	68	Garth Thomas	Jr
RB	22	Vince Weathersby	Fr
G	50	Mike Zandofsky	So
RB	20	David Emert	So

Defense

Pos.	#	Name	Class
DT	93	Steve Alvord	Jr
LB	55	Ricky Andrews	So
LB	46	Tom Erlandson	So
DT	64	Andy Fuimaono	Sr
DT	91	Brian Habib	So
LB	56	Ron Hadley	Sr
CB	24	Vestee Jackson (C)	Sr
SS	32	Allen James	Jr
LB	38	Joe Kelly (C)	Sr
MG	97	Jim Mathews	Sr
CB	12	Ron Milus	Sr
FS	26	Tim Peoples	Jr
LB	38	David Rill	So
DT	51	Reggie Rogers	Jr
LB	3	Bo Yates	So
DB	31	Tony Zackery	So

Special teams

Pos.	#	Name	Class
P	9	Thane Cleland	Jr
K	18	Jeff Jaeger	Jr

Head coach

- Don James (11th year)

Coordinators/assistant coaches

- Gary Pinkel – OC
- Jim Lambright – DC

Legend

- (C) Team captain
- (S) Suspended
- (I) Ineligible
- Injured
- Redshirt

== NFL draft ==
Four Huskies were selected in the 1986 NFL draft.

Player	Position	Round	Overall	Franchise
Joe Kelly	LB	1	11	Cincinnati Bengals
Vestee Jackson	CB	2	55	Chicago Bears
Hugh Millen	QB	3	71	Los Angeles Rams
Ron Hadley	LB	5	132	New York Jets
