= Mark Walen =

American football player (born 1963)

No. 95
- Position: Defensive tackle

Personal information
- Born: March 10, 1963 (age 63); San Francisco, California, U.S.
- Listed height: 6 ft 5 in (1.96 m)
- Listed weight: 265 lb (120 kg)

Career information
- High school: Burlingame (CA)
- College: UCLA
- NFL draft: 1986: 3rd round, 74th overall pick

Career history
- Dallas Cowboys (1986–1989)

Awards and highlights
- Second-team All-American (1985); Pac-10 Defensive Player of the Year (1985); First-team All-Pac-10 (1985)

Career NFL statistics
- Sacks: 5
- Stats at Pro Football Reference

Mark Hartley Walen (born March 10, 1963) is an American former professional football player who was a defensive tackle in the National Football League (NFL) for the Dallas Cowboys. He played college football at UCLA.

== Early life ==
Walen attended Burlingame High School, where he began playing football until his junior year. As a senior, he received All-county honors. He also lettered in basketball and soccer.

In 2005, he was inducted into the San Mateo County Sports Hall of Fame.

== College career ==
Walen accepted a football scholarship from UCLA. As a freshman, he started 2 games against the University of Oregon and USC. He also contributed to the 24–14 victory against the University of Michigan in the 1983 Rose Bowl.

As a sophomore, he was lost for the season, after tearing ligaments in his left knee during the third game against the University of Nebraska. He was able to recover in time to play in the 1984 Rose Bowl.

As a fifth-year senior, he was a key part of the seventh-ranked total defense (number 1 in rush defense), that included the play of Ken Norton Jr., Carnell Lake, James Washington, Jim Wahler and Darryl Henley. After finishing the season with 74 tackles (third on the team) and 9 sacks (tied school record), he received Pac-10 Defensive Player of the Year, second-team All-American and All-Pac-10 honors.

He finished his college career with 185 tackles, 20 sacks (set school record) and 31 tackles for loss (tied for fifth in school history).

== Professional career ==
Walen was selected by the Dallas Cowboys in the third round of the 1986 NFL draft with the 74th overall pick. As a rookie, he was lost for the year after fracturing a bone in his right ankle, while completing a 1 1/2-mile run on the last day of the Cowboys' rookie orientation in May. During the 1987 season, he saw the field only on certain passing situations.

In 1988, he had his best season when in a reserve role (started only 2 games) he registered 4 sacks (fifth on the team). On September 25, he replaced an ineffective Kevin Brooks against the Atlanta Falcons, making 4 tackles and one sack. On October 30, he started in place of Brooks against the Phoenix Cardinals, registering 9 tackles, 2 sacks and blocked an extra point.

The next season, he emerged as one of the full-time starters on the defensive line at left tackle, but was placed on the injured reserve list after suffering a torn anterior cruciate ligament in his left knee during the second pre-season game against the Los Angeles Raiders.

On August 22, 1990, he was waived after leaving the team in training camp, in reaction to being moved to the offensive line and then back to the defensive line in the span of a week.
