= Terry Tumey =

American football player and coach

Terrance J. Tumey is an American former football player and coach. He became the director of athletics for Fresno State University on August 1, 2018, having been appointed June 21. Prior to Fresno State, he served as director of athletics at Claremont-Mudd-Scripps, at UC Davis from 2012 to 2015, and Dominican University in San Rafael from 2009 to 2012.

Born in Tulsa, Oklahoma, he spent many years in football, both as a player and a coach. As a player for UCLA (1984–1987), he was a three-time All-Pacific-10 Conference nose guard, helping win four bowl games, including the 1986 Rose Bowl. After graduating with a degree in political science, he entered the UCLA Andersen School of Business to pursue an MBA. While a graduate student, he served as an assistant coach for UCLA Bruins football, eventually becoming a full-time coach (1992–1998).

In 1999, he shifted to work in the National Football League (NFL), coaching for the Denver Broncos from 1999 to 2000, then serving in the front office for the San Francisco 49ers from 2001 to 2009, first as a player personnel assistant and then eventually as director of football administration.

He has served on the board of directors of Black Empowerment, has been a voting member of the UCLA Hall of Fame Selection Committee, and has been a member of the National Association of Collegiate Directors of Athletics and the Fritz Pollard Alliance.

He is married to Dr. Candace Gonzales Tumey and has two daughters.
