= Joe Cormier =

American football player (born 1963)

Profile
- Positions: Linebacker; Tight end

Personal information
- Born: May 3, 1963 (age 63); Los Angeles, California, U.S.
- Listed height: 6 ft 6 in (1.98 m)
- Listed weight: 230 lb (104 kg)

Career information
- High school: Junípero Serra (Gardena, California)
- College: USC
- NFL draft: 1986: 10th round, 259th overall pick

Career history
- Minnesota Vikings (1986–1987); Los Angeles Raiders (1987–1990)

Awards and highlights
- Second-team All-Pac-10 (1985)
- Stats at Pro Football Reference

Joseph Daily Cormier (born May 3, 1963) is an American former professional football player who was a linebacker and tight end for the Minnesota Vikings and Los Angeles Raiders of the National Football League (NFL).

== Early life ==
Cormier was born in Los Angeles, California. He graduated from Serra High School, Gardena in 1981. At Serra, he excelled in football, basketball, and track and field. Cormier currently serves as the school's director of advancement.

== USC ==
Heavily recruited out of high school, Cormier starred as a three-year letterman for the University of Southern California Trojans football team. In 1984, Cormier caught a touchdown pass during the Trojans' Rose Bowl victory against the Ohio State Buckeyes. In the 1985 season, he caught a team-leading 44 receptions for the Trojans, played in the Aloha Bowl, and was named an All-Pac-10 Selection.

== NFL ==
Cormier was selected in the 10th Round of the 1985 Draft by the Minnesota Vikings and played in the 1987–1990 seasons for the Los Angeles Raiders.
