= 1985 Washington State Cougars football team =

American college football season

1985 Washington State Cougars football
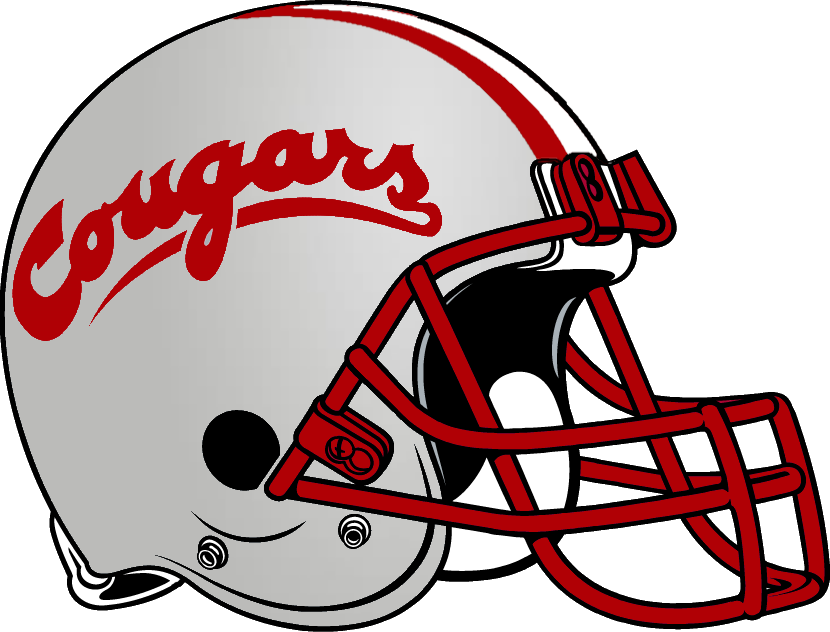
- Conference: Pacific-10 Conference
- Record: 4–7 (3–5 Pac-10)
- Head coach: Jim Walden (8th season)
- Home stadium: Martin Stadium

1985 Pacific-10 Conference football standings
| | Conf. | | | | | Overall |
| Team | W | | L | | T | W | | L | | T |
|---|---|---|---|---|---|---|---|---|---|---|
| No. 7 UCLA $ | 6 | – | 2 | – | 0 | 9 | – | 2 | – | 1 |
| Arizona | 5 | – | 2 | – | 0 | 8 | – | 3 | – | 1 |
| Arizona State | 5 | – | 2 | – | 0 | 8 | – | 4 | – | 0 |
| Washington | 5 | – | 3 | – | 0 | 7 | – | 5 | – | 0 |
| USC | 5 | – | 3 | – | 0 | 6 | – | 6 | – | 0 |
| Oregon | 3 | – | 4 | – | 0 | 5 | – | 6 | – | 0 |
| Washington State | 3 | – | 5 | – | 0 | 4 | – | 7 | – | 0 |
| Stanford | 3 | – | 5 | – | 0 | 4 | – | 7 | – | 0 |
| Oregon State | 2 | – | 6 | – | 0 | 3 | – | 8 | – | 0 |
| California | 2 | – | 7 | – | 0 | 4 | – | 7 | – | 0 |
$ – Conference champion; Rankings from AP Poll

The 1985 Washington State Cougars football team was an American football team that represented Washington State University in the Pacific-10 Conference (Pac-10) during the 1985 NCAA Division I-A football season. In their eighth season under head coach Jim Walden, the Cougars compiled a 4–7 record (3–5 in Pac-10, tied for seventh), and outscored their opponents 313 to 282. Home games were played on campus at Martin Stadium in Pullman, Washington.

The team's statistical leaders included Mark Rypien with 2,174 passing yards, Rueben Mayes with 1,236 rushing yards, and Kitrick Taylor with 489 receiving yards.

This season's offense included the "RPM" backfield: Rypien at quarterback, with Kerry Porter and Mayes at running back. All three were previous first team all-conference selections (Porter as a sophomore in 1983), and expectations were high; injuries on defense took a toll and five of their losses were by a touchdown or less.

In the Apple Cup, the Cougars won again in Husky Stadium for their third win over Washington in the last four years. With frigid temperatures and snow on the Palouse prior to the game, the Cougars held indoor practices in the evening at the Kibbie Dome in neighboring Moscow, Idaho.

Mayes rushed for over 150 yards in each of the last four games and repeated as the Pac-10 offensive player of the year. Defensive lineman Erik Howard and return specialist Kitrick Taylor were also named All-Pac-10.

== Schedule ==
| Date | Opponent | Site | Result | Attendance | Source |
|---|---|---|---|---|---|
| August 31 | Oregon | Martin Stadium; Pullman, WA | L 39–42 | 25,900 | |
| September 7 | California | Martin Stadium; Pullman, WA | W 20–19 | 30,135 | |
| September 14 | at Arizona | Arizona Stadium; Tucson, AZ | L 7–12 | 46,437 | |
| September 21 | at Utah* | Robert Rice Stadium; Salt Lake City, UT | L 37–44 | 28,576 | |
| September 28 | at No. 5 Ohio State* | Ohio Stadium; Columbus, OH | L 32–48 | 89,954 | |
| October 12 | at Oregon State | Parker Stadium; Corvallis, OR | W 34–0 | 27,236 | |
| October 19 | No. 18 UCLA^{†} | Martin Stadium; Pullman, WA | L 30–31 | 32,302 | |
| October 26 | Arizona State | Martin Stadium; Pullman, WA | L 16–21 | 14,875 | |
| November 2 | at USC | Los Angeles Memorial Coliseum; Los Angeles, CA | L 13–31 | 46,954 | |
| November 16 | Montana State* | Martin Stadium; Pullman, WA | W 64–14 | 6,807 | |
| November 23 | at Washington | Husky Stadium; Seattle, WA (Apple Cup) | W 21–20 | 59,887 | |
*Non-conference game; ^{†}Homecoming; Rankings from AP Poll released prior to the game

== Game summaries ==
=== At Washington ===
1985 Washington State game film vs. Washington (silent) on YouTube

== Personnel ==
1985 Washington State Cougars football team roster
Players
Coaches
Offense

| Pos. | # | Name | Class |
|---|---|---|---|
| QB | 10 | Ed Blount | Jr |
| WR | 24 | Rick Chase | Jr |
| G | 77 | Mike Dreyer | Sr |
| G | 59 | Peter Emsky | Sr |
| WR | 88 | Michael James | So |
| C | 61 | Curt Ladines | Sr |
| TE | 83 | Jeff Lamson | So |
| TE | 89 | Chris Leighton | Jr |
| G | 66 | Ian Lindner | Jr |
| RB | 36 | Rueben Mayes | Sr |
| FB | 30 | Kerry Porter | Jr |
| QB | 17 | Mark Rypien | Sr |
| OT | 67 | Mike Schuster | Sr |
| WR | 47 | Cotton Sears | Jr |
| RB | 38 | Junior Tautalatasi | Sr |
| WR | 8 | Kitrick Taylor | Jr |
| OT | 56 | Bill Williams | Sr |
| OT | 60 | Mike Utley | Fr |

Defense

| Pos. | # | Name | Class |
|---|---|---|---|
| DE | 97 | Mike Beasley | Sr |
| CB | 16 | Cedrick Brown | Jr |
| LB | 91 | Ben Carrillo | Sr |
| DE | 67 | Rob Cleveland | So |
| S | 25 | Ron Collins | Jr |
| LB | 35 | Dave Fitzgerald | Sr |
| LB | 57 | Brian Forde | So |
| S | 19 | Artie Holmes | Fr |
| DT | 73 | Erik Howard | Sr |
| S | 28 | Steve Haub | Sr |
| LB | 51 | James Krakoski | Jr |
| LB | 49 | Jeff Loomis | Jr |
| LB | 40 | Maury Metcalf | Fr |
| DE | | Mike Nathlich | Fr |
| LB | | Bob O'Neal | So |
| DT | 99 | Tim Petek | Fr |
| CB | 20 | Ricky Reynolds | Jr |
| S | 6 | Kevin Thomasson | Jr |
| LB | 27 | Dean Turulja | So |

Special teams

| Pos. | # | Name | Class |
|---|---|---|---|
| P | 1 | Glenn Harper | Sr |
| K | 4 | John Traut | Sr |

Head coach

- Jim Walden (8th year)

Coordinators/assistant coaches

- Jim Burrow
- Dave Elliott
- Jon Fabris
- Gary Gagnon
- Lindsay Hughes
- Steve Morton
- Mel Sanders
- Del Wight
- Ken Woody

Legend

- (C) Team captain
- (S) Suspended
- (I) Ineligible
- Injured
- Redshirt

== NFL draft ==
Four Cougars were selected in the 1986 NFL draft.

| Player | Position | Round | Overall | Franchise |
|---|---|---|---|---|
| Erik Howard | DT | 2 | 46 | New York Giants |
| Rueben Mayes | R | 3 | 57 | New Orleans Saints |
| Mark Rypien | QB | 6 | 146 | Washington Redskins |
| Junior Tautalatasi | RB | 10 | 261 | Philadelphia Eagles |
