= Ryan Knight (American football) =

American football running back (born c. 1966)

Profile
- Position: Running back

Personal information
- Born: c. 1966; Riverside, California
- Listed height: 6 ft 2 in (1.88 m)
- Listed weight: 200 lb (91 kg)

Career information
- High school: Riverside (CA) Rubidoux
- College: USC

Ryan Knight (born c. 1966) is an American former football running back. After a standout career at Rubidoux High School in Riverside, California, Knight [college football]] career for the USC Trojans. He was the 1983 USA Today High School Football Offensive Player of the Year. He is the older brother of Sammy Knight, who played twelve seasons in the National Football League.
