= Darryl Henley =

American football player (born 1966)

- Occupation: NFL player (former)
- Status: In prison
- Convictions: Drug trafficking, attempted murder
- Penalty: 41 years in prison

Details
- Imprisoned at: RRM Dallas

Darryl Henley
No. 20
- Position: Cornerback

Personal information
- Born: October 30, 1966 (age 60); Los Angeles, California, U.S.
- Listed height: 5 ft 9 in (1.75 m)
- Listed weight: 172 lb (78 kg)

Career information
- High school: Damien (LaVerne, California)
- College: UCLA
- NFL draft: 1989: 2nd round, 53rd overall pick

Career history
- Los Angeles Rams (1989–1994)

Awards and highlights
- Consensus All-American (1988); First-team All-Pac-10 (1988); Second-team All-Pac-10 (1987)

Career NFL statistics
- Tackles: 250
- Interceptions: 12
- Fumble recoveries: 3
- Stats at Pro Football Reference

Darryl Keith Henley (born October 30, 1966) is an American former professional football player who was a cornerback for the Los Angeles Rams of the National Football League (NFL). He played college football for the UCLA Bruins, earning consensus All-American honors in 1988. Henley was selected by the Rams in the second round of the 1989 NFL draft. In his pro career, he played in 76 games and amassed 12 interceptions.

Pre-draft measurables
Height	Weight	40-yard dash	10-yard split	20-yard split	Vertical jump
5 ft 8 5/8 in (1.74 m)	159 lb (72 kg)	4.59 s	1.60 s	2.68 s	33.5 in (0.85 m)

Henley is currently serving a 41-year prison sentence since 10 March 1997 for trafficking cocaine and attempting to murder his trial's presiding judge Gary L. Taylor and a witness by hiring contract killers.
