= 1981 All-America college football team =

Official list of the best college football players of 1981

The 1981 All-America college football team is composed of college football players who were selected as All-Americans by various organizations and writers that chose College Football All-America Teams in 1981. The National Collegiate Athletic Association (NCAA) recognizes four selectors as "official" for the 1981 season. They are: (1) the American Football Coaches Association (AFCA) based on the input of more than 2,000 voting members; (2) the Associated Press (AP) selected based on the votes of sports writers at AP newspapers; (3) the Football Writers Association of America (FWAA) selected by the nation's football writers; and (4) the United Press International (UPI) selected based on the votes of sports writers at UPI newspapers. Other selectors included Football News (FN), Gannett News Service (GNS), the Newspaper Enterprise Association (NEA), The Sporting News (TSN), and the Walter Camp Football Foundation (WC).

Nine players were unanimously selected as first-team All-Americans by all four official selectors. They were:

1. Marcus Allen, running back for USC, who won the 1981 Heisman Trophy, Maxwell Award, and Walter Camp Award after becoming the first player to rush for more than 2,000 yards (2,427) in a season;
2. Anthony Carter, wider receiver for Michigan, consensus first-team All-American in both 1981 and 1982 who caught 50 passes for 952 yards during the 1981 season;
3. Sean Farrell, offensive guard who helped lead Penn State to a 10–2 record and a #3 ranking in the final AP Poll;
4. Jim McMahon, quarterback for BYU and winner of the 1981 Davey O'Brien Award and Sammy Baugh Trophy;
5. Dave Rimington, center for Nebraska, two-time winner of the Outland Trophy and the namesake of the Rimington Trophy, which is awarded annually to the nation's top collegiate center.
6. Kenneth Sims, defensive tackle who helped lead Texas to a 10–1–1 record and #2 ranking in the final AP Poll, and who became the #1 pick in the 1982 NFL draft;
7. Billy Ray Smith, Jr., defensive end for Arkansas and who was a consensus first-team All-American in both 1981 and 1982;
8. Herschel Walker, running back for Georgia, a three-time consensus first-team All-American who finished second in the Heisman Trophy voting in 1981 and won the award in 1982; and
9. Tim Wrightman, tight end for UCLA who caught 28 passes for 308 yards in 1981.

Allen, Carter, McMahon, Rimington, Smith, and Walker have been inducted into the College Football Hall of Fame.

The 1981 Michigan Wolverines football team led the nation with five of its players, all on offense, receiving first-team honors from one or more of the selectors. In addition to Anthony Carter, Michigan's honorees were offensive tackles Ed Muransky and Bubba Paris, offensive guard Kurt Becker, and running back Butch Woolfolk.

== Consensus All-Americans ==
The following charts identify the NCAA-recognized consensus All-Americans for the year 1981 and displays which first-team designations they received.

=== Offense ===
Name	Position	School	Number	Official	Other
Marcus Allen	Running back	USC	4/5/9	AFCA, AP, FWAA, UPI	FN, GNS, NEA, TSN, WC
Anthony Carter	Wide receiver	Michigan	4/5/9	AFCA, AP, FWAA, UPI	FN, GNS, NEA, TSN, WC
Sean Farrell	Offensive guard	Penn State	4/5/9	AFCA, AP, FWAA, UPI	FN, GNS, NEA, TSN, WC
Herschel Walker	Running back	Georgia	4/5/9	AFCA, AP, FWAA, UPI	FN, GNS, NEA, TSN, WC
Dave Rimington	Center	Nebraska	4/3/7	AFCA, AP, FWAA, UPI	FN, GNS, WC
Tim Wrightman	Tight end	UCLA	4/2/6	AFCA, AP, FWAA, UPI	NEA, WC
Jim McMahon	Quarterback	BYU	4/2/6	AFCA, AP, FWAA, UPI	FN, GNS
Roy Foster	Offensive guard	USC	3/2/5	AFCA, FWAA, UPI	TSN, WC
Terry Tausch	Offensive tackle	Texas	2/3/5	AP, UPI	FN, TSN, WC
Kurt Becker	Offensive guard	Michigan	2/3/5	AFCA, AP	FN, GNS, NEA
Terry Crouch	Offensive tackle	Oklahoma	2/0/2	AFCA, FWAA	–
Ed Muransky	Offensive tackle	Michigan	2/0/2	AP, UPI	–

=== Defense ===
Name	Position	School	Number	Official	Other
Kenneth Sims	Defensive tackle	Texas	4/5/9	AFCA, AP, FWAA, UPI	FN, GNS, NEA, TSN, WC
Billy Ray Smith Jr.	Defensive end	Arkansas	4/5/9	AFCA, AP, FWAA, UPI	FN, GNS, NEA, TSN, WC
Bob Crable	Linebacker	Notre Dame	3/4/7	AFCA, AP, UPI	FN, GNS, TSN, WC
Andre Tippett	Defensive end	Iowa	3/2/5	AP, FWAA, UPI	FN, GNS
Tommy Wilcox	Defensive back	Alabama	3/2/5	AFCA, AP, UPI	FN, WC
Jeff Davis	Linebacker	Clemson	3/1/4	AFCA, FWAA, UPI	FN
Tim Krumrie	Middle guard	Wisconsin	2/2/4	AP, UPI	FN, WC
Mike C. Richardson	Defensive back	Arizona State	2/2/4	AP, FWAA	TSN, WC
Sal Sunseri	Linebacker	Pittsburgh	3/0/3	AFCA, AP, FWAA	--
Terry Kinard	Defensive back	Clemson	2/1/3	AP, FWAA	NEA
Fred Marion	Defensive back	Miami (FL)	2/1/3	AP, FWAA	NEA

=== Special teams ===
Name	Position	School	Number	Official	Other
Reggie Roby	Punter	Iowa	2/2/4	AP, UPI	FN, WC

== Offensive selections ==
=== Receivers ===
- Anthony Carter, Michigan (CFHOF) (AFCA, AP-1, FWAA, UPI-1, FN-1 [end], GNS, NEA-1, TSN, WC)
- Perry Tuttle, Clemson, (FN-2, NEA-1, TSN)
- Julius Dawkins, Pittsburgh (AP-1)
- Stanley Washington, TCU (AP-3, FWAA, FN-2)
- Steve Bryant, Purdue (UPI-2, NEA-2)
- Cedric Jones, Duke (AP-2)
- Jim Sandusky, UNLV (AP-2)
- Lindsay Scott, Georgia (GNS, NEA-2)
- Tom Rogers, Colgate (AP-3)

=== Tight ends ===
- Tim Wrightman, UCLA (AFCA, AP-1, UPI-1, FN-1 [end], NEA-1, WC)
- Pat Beach, Washington State (NEA-2, TSN)
- Jamie Williams, Nebraska (GNS)
- Rodney Holman, Tulane (AP-2)
- Mark Raugh, West Virginia (AP-3, UPI-2)

=== Tackles ===
- Terry Tausch, Texas (AP-1, UPI-1, FN-1, TSN, WC)
- Terry Crouch, Oklahoma (AFCA, AP-2 [guard], FWAA, UPI-2 [guard], FN-2 [guard])
- Ed Muransky, Michigan (AP-1, UPI-1, FN-2, NEA-2)
- Bubba Paris, Michigan (WC)
- John Meyer, Arizona State (GNS, NEA-1)
- Jimbo Covert, Pittsburgh (CFHOF) (FN-1, NEA-1)
- Luis Sharpe, UCLA (NEA-2, TSN)
- Don Mosebar, USC (GNS)
- Ken Dallafior, Minnesota (UPI-2)
- Maceo Fifer, Houston (AP-2)
- Lee Nanney, Clemson (UPI-2)
- Tootie Robbins, East Carolina (AP-2)
- Keith Uecker, Auburn (AP-3, FN-2)
- Harvey Salem, California (AP-3)

=== Guards ===
- Sean Farrell, Penn State (AFCA, AP-1, FWAA, UPI-1, FN-1, GNS, NEA-1, TSN, WC)
- Roy Foster, USC (AFCA, AP-2, FWAA, UPI-1, NEA-2, TSN, WC)
- Kurt Becker, Michigan (AFCA, AP-1, UPI-2, FN-1, GNS, NEA-1)
- Dave Drechsler, North Carolina (FWAA, FN-2)
- Mike Munchak, Penn State (NEA-2)
- Steve Korte, Arkansas (AP-3)
- Gerry Raymond, Boston College (AP-3)

=== Centers ===
- Dave Rimington, Nebraska (CFHOF) (AFCA, AP-1, FWAA, UPI-1, FN-1, GNS, NEA-2, WC)
- Brad Edelman, Missouri (NEA-1, TSN)
- Emil Boures, Pittsburgh (AP-2, UPI-2)
- Dan Mackie, Arizona State (FN-2)
- Mike Baab, Texas (AP-3)

=== Quarterbacks ===
- Jim McMahon, BYU (CFHOF) (AFCA [tie], AP-1, FWAA, UPI-1, FN-1, GNS, NEA-2 [tie])
- Dan Marino, Pittsburgh (CFHOF) (AFCA [tie], AP-2, UPI-2, NEA-1, TSN, WC)
- Art Schlichter, Ohio State (NEA-2 [tie])
- Reggie Collier, Southern Mississippi (AP-3)

=== Running backs ===
- Marcus Allen, USC (CFHOF) (AFCA, AP-1, FWAA, UPI-1, FN-1, GNS, NEA-1, TSN, WC)
- Herschel Walker, Georgia (CFHOF) (AFCA, AP-1, FWAA, UPI-1, FN-1, GNS, NEA-1, TSN, WC)
- Curt Warner, Penn State (CFHOF) (UPI-1, FN-2, WC)
- Darrin Nelson, Stanford (CFHOF) (AFCA [FB], AP-3, UPI-2, FN-2, NEA-2)
- Butch Woolfolk, Michigan (AP-2, UPI-2, FN-1)
- Rich Diana, Yale (AP-3, FWAA)
- Eric Dickerson, SMU (CFHOF) (AP-2, FN-2, NEA-2)
- Dwayne Crutchfield, Iowa State (UPI-2)

== Defensive selections ==
=== Defensive ends ===
- Billy Ray Smith Jr., Arkansas (CFHOF) (AFCA, AP-1, FWAA, UPI-1, FN-1, GNS, NEA-1, TSN, WC)
- Andre Tippett, Iowa (CFHOF) (AP-1, FWAA, UPI-1, FN-1, GNS, NEA-2 [LB])
- Jimmy Williams, Nebraska (AFCA, AP-2, UPI-2, FN-2, NEA-1, WC)
- David Galloway, Florida (FWAA, UPI-2, FN-2)
- Steve Clark, Utah (FWAA, NEA-2 [DT])
- Mike Pitts, Alabama (FN-2)
- Rusty Guilbeau, McNeese State (AP-2)

=== Defensive tackles ===
- Kenneth Sims, Texas (CFHOF) (AFCA, AP-1, FWAA, UPI-1, FN-1, GNS, NEA-1, TSN, WC)
- Lester Williams, Miami (Fla.) (AP-2, UPI-1, FN-1, NEA-1, TSN [DE], WC)
- Glen Collins, Mississippi State (AFCA, NEA-2, TSN)
- Jeff Gaylord, Missouri (AP-1, UPI-2)
- Harvey Armstrong, SMU (AFCA, FN-2)
- Rick Bryan, Oklahoma (GNS)
- Jeff Bryant, Clemson (FN-2)
- Fletcher Jenkins, Washington (AP-2, NEA-2)
- Eddie Weaver, Georgia (UPI-2)

=== Middle guards ===
- Tim Krumrie, Wisconsin (CFHOF) (AP-1, UPI-1, FN-1, NEA-2, WC)
- Emanuel Weaver, South Carolina (NEA-1)
- George Achica, USC (AP-2, GNS)
- Pat Dean, Iowa (UPI-2)

=== Linebackers ===
- Bob Crable, Notre Dame (CFHOF) (AFCA, AP-1, UPI-1, FN-1, GNS, TSN, WC)
- Jeff Davis, Clemson (CFHOF) (AFCA, AP-2, FWAA, UPI-1, FN-1)
- Sal Sunseri, Pittsburgh (AFCA, AP-1, FWAA, UPI-2)
- Johnie Cooks, Mississippi State (AP-1, FWAA, UPI-2, FN-1, GNS, NEA-1, TSN)
- Chip Banks, USC (UPI-1, NEA-2, TSN, WC)
- Tom Boyd, Alabama (NEA-1, WC)
- Mark Stewart, Washington (GNS)
- Kirk Hamon, Pacific (GNS)
- Ricky Young, Oklahoma State (AP-2, FN-2)
- Marcus Marek, Ohio State (AP-2, UPI-2, FN-2)
- Robert Brown, Virginia Tech (NEA-2)
- Mike Merriweather, Pacific (NEA-2)
- Chet Parlavecchio, Penn State (FN-2)

=== Defensive backs ===
- Mike Richardson, Arizona State (AP-1, FWAA, UPI-2, NEA-2, TSN, WC)
- Tommy Wilcox, Alabama (AFCA, AP-1, UPI-1, FN-1, WC)
- Terry Kinard, Clemson (CFHOF) (AP-1, FWAA, NEA-1)
- Fred Marion, Miami (Fla.) (AFCA, AP-2, UPI-1, FN-2)
- John Krimm, Notre Dame (GNS, NEA-1, TSN)
- Johnny Jackson, Air Force (AP-2, FWAA, NEA-2)
- Steve Cordle, Fresno St. (AFCA)
- Vann McElroy, Baylor (UPI-2, FN-1, WC)
- Ray Horton, Washington (NEA-1)
- Matt Vanden Boom, Wisconsin (AP-2, UPI-1)
- Paul Sorensen, Washington State (FN-1, GNS, NEA-1)
- Rodney Lewis, Nebraska (TSN)
- Rick Woods, Boise State (GNS)
- Jim Burroughs, Michigan State (FN-2, TSN)
- Paul Lankford, Penn State (GNS)
- Jim Bob Harris, Alabama (UPI-2)
- Mike Kennedy, Toledo (NEA-2)
- Kevin Potter, Missouri (FN-2)
- Ken Thomas, San Jose State (NEA-2)

== Special teams ==
=== Kickers ===
- Morten Andersen, Michigan State (AP-3, UPI-1, FN-2, GNS, NEA-2, TSN, WC)
- Bruce Lahay, Arkansas (FWAA, NEA-1)
- Gary Anderson, Syracuse (AP-1)
- Danny Miller, Miami (Fla.) (UPI-2, FN-1)
- Eddie Garcia, SMU (AP-2)

=== Punters ===
- Reggie Roby, Iowa (AP-1, UPI-1, FN-1, WC)
- Rohn Stark, Florida State (FWAA, UPI-2, FN-2, GNS, NEA-1, TSN)
- Maury Buford, Texas Tech (NEA-2)
- Bucky Scribner, Kansas (AP-2)

== Key ==
- **Bold** – Consensus All-American
- -1 – First-team selection
- -2 – Second-team selection
- -3 – Third-team selection
- CFHOF = College Football Hall of Fame inductee

=== Official selectors ===
- AFCA – American Football Coaches Association, a.k.a. the Kodak All-America team
- AP – Associated Press
- FWAA – Football Writers Association of America
- UPI – United Press International

=== Other selectors ===
- FN – Football News
- GNS – Gannett News Service
- NEA – Newspaper Enterprise Association
- TSN – The Sporting News
- WC – Walter Camp Football Foundation

== See also ==
- 1981 All-Atlantic Coast Conference football team
- 1981 All-Big Eight Conference football team
- 1981 All-Big Ten Conference football team
- 1981 All-Pacific-10 Conference football team
- 1981 All-SEC football team
