= AP All-Time All-America college football team =

Selection of college football All-America players

In 2025, to mark the 100th anniversary of the Associated Press' annual All-America college football team, a panel of AP sportswriters selected an all-time first and second team composed of the top players between 1925 and 2025.

Since 1925, nearly 2,000 men have earned AP first-team All-America honors. To be considered for the AP All-Time All-America list, a player must have received first-team recognition at least once. As a result, notable players like Anthony Muñoz were never eligible and punter Ray Guy was also excluded because the Associated Press did not select punters for its All-America team during his era.

== Selected players ==
Position	Player	Team	Tenure	AP first-team All-America selections
First-team Offense
QB	Tim Tebow	Florida	2006–2009	2007 (Note: Also selected to the second-team in 2009.)
RB	Barry Sanders	Oklahoma State	1986–1988	1988 (Note: Also selected to the second-team as a return specialist in 1987.)
RB	Herschel Walker	Georgia	1980–1982	1980, 1981, 1982
WR	Larry Fitzgerald	Pittsburgh	2002–2003	2003
WR	Randy Moss	Marshall	1996–1997	1997
TE	Brock Bowers	Georgia	2021–2023	2023
OT	Bill Fralic	Pittsburgh	1981–1984	1982, 1983, 1984
OT	Orlando Pace	Ohio State	1994–1996	1995, 1996
G	John Hannah	Alabama	1970–1972	1972 (Note: Also selected to the second-team in 1971.)
G	Jim Parker	Ohio State	1954–1956	1956 (Note: Also selected to the third-team in 1955.)
C	Chuck Bednarik	Penn	1945–1948	1947, 1948
First-team Defense
DE	Hugh Green	Pittsburgh	1977–1980	1978, 1979, 1980 (Note: Also selected to the second-team in 1977.)
DE	Randy White	Maryland	1972–1974	1973, 1974
DT	Bronko Nagurski	Minnesota	1927–1929	1929
DT	Ndamukong Suh	Nebraska	2005–2009	2009
LB	Dick Butkus	Illinois	1962–1964	1963, 1964 (Note: Selected as both center and linebacker.)
LB	Chris Spielman	Ohio State	1984–1987	1986, 1987 (Note: Also selected to the third-team in 1985.)
LB	Derrick Thomas	Alabama	1985–1988	1988
CB	Deion Sanders	Florida State	1985–1988	1987, 1988 (Note: Also selected to the third-team in 1986.)
CB	Charles Woodson	Michigan	1995–1997	1996, 1997
S	Ronnie Lott	USC	1977–1980	1980
S	Ed Reed	Miami (FL)	1997–2001	2000, 2001
First-team Special Teams
K	Sebastian Janikowski	Florida State	1997–1999	1998, 1999
P	Tory Taylor	Iowa	2020–2023	2023
All-purpose	Johnny Rodgers	Nebraska	1970–1972	1972

Position	Player	Team	Tenure	AP first-team All-America selections
Second-team Offense
QB	Vince Young	Texas	2002–2005	2005
RB	Tony Dorsett	Pittsburgh	1973–1976	1973, 1976 (Note: Also selected to the second-team in 1975 and third-team in 1974.)
RB	Archie Griffin	Ohio State	1972–1975	1974, 1975 (Note: Also selected to the second-team in 1973.)
WR	Desmond Howard	Michigan	1988–1991	1991 (Note: Also selected to the third-team as a return specialist in 1990.)
WR	DeVonta Smith	Alabama	2017–2020	2020
TE	Keith Jackson	Oklahoma	1984–1987	1986, 1987 (Note: Also selected to the second-team in 1985.)
OT	Bryant McKinnie	Miami (FL)	1999–2001	2001
OT	Jonathan Ogden	UCLA	1992–1995	1995
G	Brad Budde	USC	1976–1979	1979
G	John Smith	Notre Dame	1925–1927	1927
C	Dave Rimington	Nebraska	1979–1982	1981, 1982
Second-team Defense
DE	Bruce Smith	Virginia Tech	1981–1984	1984 (Note: Also selected to the second-team in 1983.)
DE	Bubba Smith	Michigan State	1964–1966	1966
DT	Warren Sapp	Miami (FL)	1991–1994	1994
DT	Lee Roy Selmon	Oklahoma	1972–1975	1975 (Note: Also selected to the second-team in 1974.)
LB	Brian Bosworth	Oklahoma	1984–1986	1985, 1986 (Note: Also selected to the second-team in 1984.)
LB	Jerry Robinson	UCLA	1975–1978	1976, 1977, 1978
LB	Lawrence Taylor	North Carolina	1977–1980	1980
CB	Champ Bailey	Georgia	1996–1998	1998
CB	Tyrann Mathieu	LSU	2010–2011	2011
S	Bennie Blades	Miami (FL)	1984–1987	1986, 1987
S	Al Brosky	Illinois	1950–1952	1951
Second-team Special Teams
K	Martin Gramatica	Kansas State	1994–1998	1997 (Note: Also selected to the second-team in 1998.)
P	Reggie Roby	Iowa	1979–1982	1981 (Note: Also selected to the third-team in 1982.)
All-purpose	Tim Brown	Notre Dame	1984–1987	1986, 1987 (Note: Selected as both wide receiver and return specialist.)
