= Bill Fralic =

American professional football player and professional wrestler (1962 – 2018)

No. 79
- Position: Guard

Personal information
- Born: October 31, 1962; Pittsburgh, Pennsylvania, U.S.
- Died: December 13, 2018 (aged 56); Atlanta, Georgia, U.S.
- Listed height: 6 ft 5 in (1.96 m)
- Listed weight: 285 lb (129 kg)

Career information
- High school: Penn Hills (Penn Hills, Pennsylvania)
- College: Pittsburgh (1981–1984)
- NFL draft: 1985: 1st round, 2nd overall pick

Career history
- Atlanta Falcons (1985–1992); Detroit Lions (1993)

Awards and highlights
- 2× First-team All-Pro (1986, 1987); Second-team All-Pro (1988); 4× Pro Bowl (1986–1989); NFL 1980s All-Decade Team; PFWA All-Rookie Team (1985); UPI Lineman of the Year (1984); 2× Unanimous All-American (1983, 1984); First-team All-American (1982); 3× First-team All-East (1982, 1983, 1984); Second-team All-East (1981); First-team AP All-Time All-American (2025); Pittsburgh Panthers No. 79 retired

Career NFL statistics
- Games played: 132
- Games started: 131
- Fumble recoveries: 2
- Stats at Pro Football Reference
- College Football Hall of Fame

William P. Fralic Jr. (/ˈfreɪlɪk/ FRAY-lik; October 31, 1962 – December 13, 2018) was an American professional football player who was a guard for the Atlanta Falcons and Detroit Lions of the National Football League (NFL) from 1985 to 1993. He played college football for the Pittsburgh Panthers.

== Early life ==
Born in Penn Hills, Pennsylvania, Fralic played high school football at Penn Hills High School and graduated in 1981. Readers of the Pennsylvania Football News named him to the "All Century" team of Pennsylvania high school football players. He is listed beside Chuck Bednarik and Mike Munchak as a first team guard. Fralic was named the male high school athlete of the year by the Pittsburgh Post-Gazette.

== College career ==
After high school, the highly recruited Fralic attended the University of Pittsburgh on a football scholarship. While at Pitt, he played offensive tackle for the Panthers and was named a unanimous All-American his junior and senior seasons. He was known for the 'Pancake Block' which was termed for the way he would flatten his opponents when blocking. Fralic's teammates at Pitt included future Hall of Famers offensive tackle Jimbo Covert, defensive end Chris Doleman and quarterback Dan Marino.

== NFL career ==
In the 1985 NFL draft, Fralic was selected by the Atlanta Falcons in the first round with the second overall pick. He became a starter for the Falcons at guard during his rookie season. Fralic went on to be named All-Pro in 1986 and 1987, and was named to the Pro Bowl from 1986 to 1989. During this time, the 6 ft 5 in (1.96 m), 280 lb (127 kg) Fralic developed a reputation as a ferocious run blocker.

At the end of his NFL career, Fralic was one of the first players to take advantage of the new free agent system and jumped from the Falcons to the Detroit Lions, almost doubling his pay to $1.6 million for the 1993 season. The 1989 action figure of Fralic, from the Starting Lineup Kenner toy line, is the 'Holy Grail' for collectors. As of 2020, a loose figure (not in the package) can fetch as much as $900 US dollars. The trading card that came with the figure is worth $200-$300.

== Professional wrestling and color commentary ==
In 1986, Fralic was one of six football players in the twenty-man battle royal at WrestleMania 2, in which Andre the Giant was the victor. Leading up to the bout, Fralic's interviews pitted him as a rival to Big John Studd.

Fralic co-hosted the April 25, 1992, episode of WCW Saturday Night with Jim Ross and said he was weighing his options between joining WCW or going back to the NFL for the 1992 season. Fralic ultimately left the Atlanta Falcons, signed as a free agent with the Detroit Lions, and did not pursue pro wrestling.

He briefly returned to the World Wrestling Federation on July 4, 1993, to participate in the Stars and Stripes Challenge aboard the USS Intrepid, trying to bodyslam the 550-pound WWF champion, Yokozuna.

Fralic was a color commentator for Falcons radio broadcasts from 1995 to 1997, and commentated Pittsburgh Panther broadcasts from 2004 to 2010.

== Personal life and death ==
Fralic died at the age of 56 on December 13, 2018, from cancer.

During his NFL career, Fralic publicly opposed the use of steroids by NFL players and advocated more rigorous and more random testing to detect steroid use. In May 1989, he testified before the U.S. Senate that steroid use in the NFL was rampant. The chairman of the Senate Judiciary Committee at the time, Sen. Joe Biden of Delaware, was said to have found Fralic's testimony "refreshing and believable."

In Atlanta, Fralic ran Bill Fralic Insurance Services, which he began during his playing days with the Falcons in 1989.

Fralic had an unusual provision in his first contract with the Falcons that guaranteed that the team would pay him $150,000 per year for 40 years, even after he was no longer with the Falcons and his playing career was over. This provision came about because Fralic's father, Bill Fralic Sr., insisted that his son have security in his contract.

== Honors and awards ==
In 2024, he was included in Croatian American Sports Hall of Fame.
