= 1981 All-East football team =

American college football all-star team

The 1981 All-East football team consists of American football players chosen by the Associated Press as the best players at each position among the Eastern colleges and universities during the 1981 NCAA Division I-A football season.

== Offense ==
=== Quarterback ===
- Dan Marino, Pitt (AP-1)
- Oliver Luck, West Virginia (AP-2)

=== Running backs ===
- Rich Diana, Yale (AP-1)
- Eddie Meyers, Navy (AP-1)
- Joe Morris, Syracuse (AP-2)
- Curt Warner, Penn State (AP-2)

=== Tight end ===
- Mark Raugh, West Virginia (AP-1)
- Steve Jordan, Brown (AP-2)

=== Wide receivers ===
- Julius Dawkins, Pitt (AP-1)
- Tom Rogers, Colgate (AP-1)
- Curt Grieve, Yale (AP-2)
- Gerald Lucear, Temple (AP-2)

=== Tackles ===
- Jim Covert, Pitt (AP-1)
- Gerry Raymond, Boston College (AP-1)
- Bill Fralic, Pitt (AP-2)
- John McCollom, Syracuse (AP-2)

=== Guards ===
- Sean Farrell, Penn State (AP-1)
- Mike Munchak, Penn State (AP-1)
- Rob Fada, Pitt (AP-2)
- George Thompson, Dartmouth (AP-2)

=== Center ===
- Emil Boures, Pitt (AP-1)
- Jim Romano, Penn State (AP-2)

=== Placekicker ===
- Gary Anderson, Syracuse (AP-1)
- Steve Fehr, Navy (AP-2)

== Defense ==
=== Ends ===
- Fred Leone, Yale (AP-1)
- Darryl Talley, West Virginia (AP-1)
- Walker Lee Ashley, Penn State (AP-2)
- Michael Woods, Pitt (AP-2)

=== Tackles ===
- Junior Poles, Boston College (AP-1)
- Leo Wisniewski, Penn State (AP-1)
- Todd Campbell, West Virginia (AP-2)
- Kelly Robinson, Colgate (AP-2)

=== Middle guard ===
- Tim Jordan, Navy (AP-1)
- J. C. Pelusi, Pitt (AP-2)

=== Linebackers ===
- Steve Conjar, Temple (AP-1)
- Chet Parlavecchio, Penn State (AP-1)
- Sal Sunseri, Pitt (AP-1)
- Dennis Fowlkes, West Virginia (AP-2)
- Ed Pryts, Penn State (AP-2)
- Dave Wolf, Colgate (AP-2)

=== Defensive backs ===
- Lind Murray, West Virginia (AP-1)
- Mark Robinson, Penn State (AP-1)
- Mike Williams, Army (AP-1)
- Rocky Delgadillo, Harvard (AP-2)
- Tom Flynn, Pitt (AP-2)
- Paul Lankford, Penn State (AP-2)

=== Punter ===
- Ralph Giacomarro, Penn State (AP-1)
- Joe Sartiano, Army (AP-2)

== Key ==
- AP = Associated Press

== See also ==
- 1981 College Football All-America Team
