= 1982 All-East football team =

American college football all-star team

The 1982 All-East football team consists of American football players chosen by the Associated Press as the best players at each position among the Eastern colleges and universities during the 1982 NCAA Division I-A football season.

== Offense ==
=== Quarterback ===
- Todd Blackledge, Penn State (AP-1)
- Doug Flutie, Boston College (AP-2)

=== Running backs ===
- Bryan Thomas, Pitt (AP-1)
- Curt Warner, Penn State (AP-1)
- Jaime Covington, Syracuse (AP-2)
- Jon Williams, Penn State (AP-2)

=== Tight end ===
- Mike McCloskey, Penn State (AP-1)
- Mark Raugh, West Virginia (AP-2)

=== Wide receivers ===
- Dwight Collins, Pitt (AP-1)
- Kenny Jackson, Penn State (AP-1)
- Andrew Baker, Rutgers (AP-2)
- Jon Schoen, Boston College (AP-2)

=== Tackles ===
- Jim Covert, Pitt (AP-1)
- Bill Fralic, Pitt (AP-1)
- Bill Contz, Penn State (AP-2)
- Rich Spitzer, Rutgers (AP-2)

=== Guards ===
- Ron Sams, Pitt (AP-1)
- Pete Speros, Penn State (AP-1)
- Rob Fada, Pitt (AP-2)
- Steve Lively, Boston College (AP-2)

=== Center ===
- Jack Belcher, Boston College (AP-1)
- Mark Battaglia, Penn State (AP-2)

=== Placekicker ===
- Paul Woodside, West Virginia (AP-1)
- Alex Falcinelli, Rutgers (AP-2)

== Defense ==
=== Ends ===
- Walker Lee Ashley, Penn State (AP-1)
- Darryl Talley, West Virginia (AP-1)
- Larry Carroll, Army (AP-2)
- Al Wenglikowski, Pitt (AP-2)

=== Tackles ===
- Todd Campbell, West Virginia (AP-1)
- Mike Charles, Syracuse (AP-1)
- Greg Gattuso, Penn State (AP-2)
- Dave Puzzuoli, Pitt (AP-2)

=== Middle guard ===
- J. C. Pelusi, Pitt (AP-1)

=== Linebackers ===
- Steve DeOssie, Boston College (AP-1)
- Jim Dumont, Rutgers (AP-1)
- Andy Ponseigo, Navy (AP-1)
- Dennis Fowlkes, West Virginia (AP-2)
- Scott Radecic, Penn State (AP-2)
- Keith Woetzel, Rutgers (AP-2)

=== Defensive backs ===
- Mark Robinson, Penn State (AP-1)
- Mike Williams, Army (AP-1)
- Anthony Young, Temple (AP-1)
- Tim Agee, West Virginia (AP-2)
- Vic Crawford, Boston College (AP-2)
- Tom Flynn, Pitt (AP-2)
- Harry Hamilton, Penn State (AP-2)

=== Punter ===
- Ralph Giacomarro, Penn State (AP-1)
- Joe Sartiano, Army (AP-2)

== Key ==
- AP = Associated Press

== See also ==
- 1982 College Football All-America Team
