= Emil Boures =

American football player (born 1960)

No. 71
- Positions: Center, guard, tackle

Personal information
- Born: January 29, 1960 (age 66); Bridgeport, Pennsylvania, U.S.
- Listed height: 6 ft 1 in (1.85 m)
- Listed weight: 259 lb (117 kg)

Career information
- High school: Bishop Kenrick (Norristown, Pennsylvania)
- College: Pittsburgh
- NFL draft: 1982: 7th round, 182nd overall pick

Career history
- Pittsburgh Steelers (1982–1985); Cleveland Browns (1987)*
- * Offseason or practice squad member only

Awards and highlights
- Second-team All-American (1981); First-team All-East (1981); Second-team All-East (1980)

Career NFL statistics
- Games played: 35
- Games started: 15
- Stats at Pro Football Reference

Emil Nicholas Boures (born January 29, 1960) is an American former professional football player who was an offensive lineman for four seasons with the Pittsburgh Steelers of the National Football League (NFL). He played college football for the Pittsburgh Panthers.

== Personal life ==
Boures was born in Bridgeport, Pennsylvania, and attended Bishop Kenrick High School in Norristown, Pennsylvania.

He matriculated at the University of Pittsburgh (Pitt).

== Professional career ==
Boures was selected 182nd overall by the Pittsburgh Steelers in the seventh round of the 1982 NFL draft. He played for the Steelers from 1982 through 1985 starting fourteen games in that four-year span. He played center, guard and tackle on the offensive line.
