= Mike Kennedy (American football) =

American football player (born 1959)

No. 21, 27
- Position: Safety

Personal information
- Born: February 26, 1959 (age 67); Toledo, Ohio, U.S.
- Listed height: 6 ft 0 in (1.83 m)
- Listed weight: 195 lb (88 kg)

Career information
- High school: St. Francis DeSales (Toledo)
- College: Toledo
- NFL draft: 1982: undrafted

Career history
- Atlanta Falcons (1982)*; Buffalo Bills (1983); Houston Oilers (1984)
- * Offseason or practice squad member only

Awards and highlights
- Second-team All-American (1981); 2x First-team All-MAC (1979, 1981)

Career NFL statistics
- Interceptions: 1
- Fumble recoveries: 1
- Touchdowns: 1
- Stats at Pro Football Reference

Michael Scott Kennedy (born February 26, 1959) is an American former professional football player who was a defensive back in the National Football League (NFL).

Born and raised in Toledo, Ohio, Kennedy played scholastically at St. Francis de Sales School.

== Career ==
Kennedy played college football at the University of Toledo for the Toledo Rockets from 1977 to 1979 and 1981. He was named to the starting lineup in the fourth game of his freshman season and became one of the Rockets' best defensive backs. During his time with the Rockets, he made 314 tackles and was voted the team's best player in 1979 and 1981, as well as being named to the First-Team All-MAC. In 1981, he was also voted to the Second-Team All American by the Newspaper Enterprise Association. In 1979, he finished third in the vote for the MAC's best defensive player. For the 100th anniversary of the Rockets in 2017, Kennedy was voted 18th on the All-Century Team.

Kennedy played the entire preseason of the 1983 season with the Buffalo Bills, but was released before the start of the regular season. On September 28, 1983, the Bills re-signed him. He played the rest of the season with the Bills, starting seven games. Kennedy made 59 tackles and caught one interception, which he returned for a 22-yard touchdown. He was released on August 27, 1984, before the start of the 1984 season, but was signed by the Houston Oilers on August 30, 1984. On August 21, 1985, Kennedy was released by the Oilers.
