= 1980 All-Pacific-10 Conference football team =

The 1980 All-Pacific-10 Conference football team consists of American football players chosen by various organizations for All-Pacific-10 Conference teams for the 1980 NCAA Division I-A football season.

== Offensive selections ==
=== Quarterbacks ===
- John Elway, Stanford (Coaches-1)
- Tom Flick, Washington (Coaches-2)

=== Running backs ===
- Marcus Allen, USC (Coaches-1)
- Freeman McNeil, UCLA (Coaches-1)
- Darrin Nelson, Stanford (Coaches-1)
- Willie Gittens, Arizona St. (Coaches-2)
- Tony Robinson, Oregon St. (Coaches-2)
- Toussaint Tyler, Washington (Coaches-2)

=== Wide receivers ===
- Ken Margerum, Stanford (Coaches-1)
- Andre Tyler, Stanford (Coaches-1)
- John Mistler, Arizona St. (Coaches-2)
- Cormac Carney, UCLA (Coaches-2)

=== Tight ends ===
- Tim Wrightman, UCLA (Coaches-1)
- Hoby Brenner, USC (Coaches-2)

=== Tackles ===
- Keith Van Horne, USC (Coaches-1)
- Brian Holloway, Stanford (Coaches-1)
- Randy Van Divier, Washington (Coaches-2)
- Bill Jensen, Arizona (Coaches-2)

=== Guards ===
- Larry Lee, UCLA (Coaches-1)
- Roy Foster, USC (Coaches-1)
- Greg Sykes, Washington St. (Coaches-2)
- John Tautolo, UCLA (Coaches-2)

=== Centers ===
- John Macaulay, Stanford (Coaches-1)
- Roger Levasa, Oregon St. (Coaches-2)

== Defensive selections ==
=== Linemen ===
- Irv Eatman, UCLA (Coaches-1)
- Vince Goldsmith, Oregon (Coaches-1)
- Dennis Edwards, USC (Coaches-1)
- George Achica, USC (Coaches-1)
- Mike Robinson, Arizona (Coaches-2)
- Fletcher Jenkins, Washington (Coaches-2)
- Mark Jerue, Washington (Coaches-2)
- Rusty Olsen, Washington (Coaches-2)

=== Linebackers ===
- Avon Riley, UCLA (Coaches-1)
- Chip Banks, USC (Coaches-1)
- Vernon Maxwell, Arizona St. (Coaches-1)
- Rich Dixon, California (Coaches-1)
- Riki Gray, USC (Coaches-2)
- Bryan Hinkle, Oregon (Coaches-2)
- Milt McColl, Stanford (Coaches-2)
- Mark Stewart, Washington (Coaches-2)

=== Defensive backs ===
- Kenny Easley, UCLA (Coaches-1)
- Dennis Smith, USC (Coaches-1)
- Ronnie Lott, USC (Coaches-1)
- Dave Liggins, Arizona (Coaches-1)
- Marcellus Greene, Arizona (Coaches-2)
- Lupe Sanchez, UCLA (Coaches-2)
- Ron Coccimiglio, California (Coaches-2)
- Mike Richardson, Arizona St. (Coaches-2)

== Special teams ==
=== Placekickers ===
- Chuck Nelson, Washington (Coaches-1)
- Mick Luckhurst, California (Coaches-2)

=== Punters ===
- Mike Black, Arizona St. (Coaches-1)
- Sergio Vega, Arizona (Coaches-2)

=== Return specialists ===
- Willie Gittens, Arizona St. (Coaches-1)
- Ken Gardner, Washington (Coaches-2)

== Key ==
Coaches = Pacific-10 head football coaches

== See also ==
- 1980 College Football All-America Team
