= Steve Korte =

American football player (born 1960)

No. 60
- Positions: Center, guard

Personal information
- Born: January 15, 1960 (age 66); Denver, Colorado, U.S.
- Listed height: 6 ft 3 in (1.91 m)
- Listed weight: 265 lb (120 kg)

Career information
- High school: Arapahoe (Centennial, Colorado)
- College: Arkansas
- NFL draft: 1983: 2nd round, 38th overall pick

Career history
- New Orleans Saints (1983–1989)

Awards and highlights
- Unanimous All-American (1982); Third-team All-American (1981); First-team All-SWC (1982)

Career NFL statistics
- Games played: 83
- Games started: 63
- Fumble recoveries: 3
- Stats at Pro Football Reference

Steve Korte (born January 15, 1960) is an American former professional football player who was a center and an offensive guard for the New Orleans Saints of the National Football League (NFL) from 1983 to 1990. He scored one touchdown from a fumble recovery.

Korte played college football at the University of Arkansas. He was a consensus All-American in 1982 at guard. He bench pressed 585 pounds, making him one of the strongest football players in Arkansas Razorbacks football history. In 2015 Korte was inducted into the Arkansas Sports Hall of Honor.

Korte's son, Steven Korte, played fullback for the LSU Tigers football team and was signed by the Green Bay Packers in 2008 but did not play.
