= Darrin Nelson =

American football player (born 1959)

No. 20
- Positions: Running back, return specialist

Personal information
- Born: January 2, 1959 (age 67); Sacramento, California, U.S.
- Listed height: 5 ft 9 in (1.75 m)
- Listed weight: 184 lb (83 kg)

Career information
- High school: Pius X (Downey, California)
- College: Stanford (1977–1978, 1980–1981)
- NFL draft: 1982: 1st round, 7th overall pick

Career history
- Minnesota Vikings (1982–1989); San Diego Chargers (1989-1990); Minnesota Vikings (1991–1992)

Awards and highlights
- Minnesota Vikings 40th Anniversary Team; First-team All-American (1981); Second-team All-American (1978); 4× First-team All-Pac-10 (1977, 1978, 1980, 1981)

Career NFL statistics
- Rushing yards: 4,442
- Rushing average: 4.4
- Rushing touchdowns: 18
- Receptions: 286
- Receiving yards: 2,559
- Receiving touchdowns: 5
- Kickoff return yards: 3,659
- Punt return yards: 357
- Stats at Pro Football Reference
- College Football Hall of Fame

Darrin Milo Nelson (born January 2, 1959) is an American former professional football player who was a running back and return specialist in the National Football League (NFL) for the Minnesota Vikings and San Diego Chargers. He played college football for the Stanford Cardinal, earning second-team All-American honors in 1978.

== Early life ==
Nelson attended Pius X High School. He accepted a football scholarship from Stanford University to play under head coach Bill Walsh.

In his first year at Stanford in 1977, he was named the starter and became the first freshman running back in conference history to rush for more than 1,000 yards in a season. He registered 183 carries for 1,069 yards, 3 rushing touchdowns, 50 receptions for 524 yards and 3 receiving touchdowns.

As a sophomore in 1978, he posted 167 carries for 1,061 yards, 6 rushing touchdowns, 50 receptions for 446 yards and 4 receiving touchdowns.

In 1979, he was lost for the season with a hamstring injury. As a junior in 1980, he had 161 carries for 889 yards, 4 rushing touchdowns, 47 receptions for 552 yards and 4 receiving touchdowns.

As a senior in 1981, he collected 192 carries for 1,014 yards, 11 rushing touchdowns, 67 receptions for 846 yards and 5 receiving touchdowns.

Nelson was a dual threat as a rusher and receiver, becoming the first player in NCAA history to rush for more than 1,000 yards and catch more than 50 passes in one season. He accomplished this feat three times. He finished his college career with the school records for rushing yards (4,033), receptions (214), touchdowns (40), scoring (242 points), while also setting the NCAA record with 6,885 career all-purpose yards.

He was inducted into the Stanford Athletic Hall of Fame. In 2014, he was inducted into the College Football Hall of Fame.

== Professional career ==
=== Minnesota Vikings (first stint) ===
Nelson was selected by the Minnesota Vikings in the first round (7th overall) of the 1982 NFL draft. As a rookie, he experienced a strike-shortened season that was reduced to 9 games, finishing second on the team to Ted Brown with 136 rushing yards.

As a running back, Nelson was a threat as both a runner and as receiver out of the backfield, though he is perhaps best known for dropping the game-tying touchdown on 4th down in the closing moments of the 1987 NFC Championship Game. In 1988, he missed three games with an injury (Fell down the stairs at his home in Minnetonka Mn.).

In 1989, he staged an acrimonious contract holdout and lost his starting position to D.J. Dozier. On October 12, Nelson was traded to the Dallas Cowboys as part of the Herschel Walker Trade. At the time he had appeared in 5 games as a backup, registering 67 carries for 321 yards and 38 receptions for 380 yards.

=== San Diego Chargers ===
On October 17, 1989, after refusing to report to Dallas, he was traded to the San Diego Chargers in exchange for a fifth round draft choice (#116-Reggie Thornton) as part of the Herschel Walker trade. He was the third-string running back behind Marion Butts and Tim Spencer. On September 3, 1990, he was released and later re-signed. He was the fourth-string running back during that season.

=== Minnesota Vikings (second stint) ===
In 1991, he was signed as a free agent by the Minnesota Vikings. He was a backup running back behind Herschel Walker and Terry Allen and was also the team's kickoff returner for two seasons. On August 30, 1992, he was released and later re-signed. He announced his retirement on June 30, 1993.

For his career, Nelson rushed for 4,442 yards, caught 286 passes for 2,559 yards and scored 23 touchdowns (18 rushing and 5 receiving) in 152 games.

== Career stats ==
Legend
	Led the Pac-8/Pac-10
**Bold**	Career high

Stanford Cardinal
Season	Rushing					Receiving			
Season	Att	Yards	Avg	TD	Lng	Rec	Yards	Avg	TD
1977	183	**1,069**	5.8	3	0	50	524	10.6	3
1978	167	1,061	**6.4**	6	0	50	446	8.9	4
1979	Did not play due to injury								
1980	161	889	5.5	4	**40**	47	552	11.7	4
1981	**192**	1,014	5.3	**11**	0	**67**	**846**	**12.6**	**5**
NCAA career	703	4,033	5.7	24	40	214	2,368	11.1	16

Legend
	Led the league
**Bold**	Career high

NFL career statistics
Minnesota Vikings
Season	GP	Rushing					Receiving				
Season	GP	Att	Yds	Avg	Lng	TD	Rec	Yds	Avg	Lng	TD
1982	7	44	136	3.1	18	0	9	100	11.1	22	0
1983	15	154	642	4.2	56T	1	51	**618**	**12.1**	**68**	0
1984	15	80	406	5.1	39	3	27	162	6.0	17	0
1985	16	**200**	**893**	4.5	37	**5**	43	301	7.0	25T	1
1986	16	191	793	4.2	42	4	**53**	593	11.2	34	**3**
1987	10	131	642	4.9	72	2	26	129	5.0	13	0
1988	13	112	380	3.4	27	1	16	105	6.6	27	0
1989	5	31	124	4.0	24	0	24	52	7.4	7	0
San Diego Chargers
1989	9	36	197	5.5	28	0	31	328	10.6	49	0
1990	14	3	14	4.7	5	0	4	29	7.3	10	0
Minnesota Vikings
1991	16	28	210	**7.5**	29	2	19	142	7.5	13	0
1992	16	10	5	0.5	9	0	0	0	0.0	0	0
NFL career	152	1,020	4,442	4.4	72	18	286	2,559	8.9	68	5

== Personal life ==
Nelson spent 15 years in the administration at Stanford University. In 2011, Nelson became the Senior Associate Athletic Director for the University of California Irvine.
