= 1981 All-Pacific-10 Conference football team =

The 1981 All-Pacific-10 Conference football team consists of American football players chosen by various organizations for All-Pacific-10 Conference teams for the 1981 NCAA Division I-A football season.

== Offensive selections ==
=== Quarterbacks ===
- Mike Pagel, Arizona State (Coaches-1)
- John Elway, Stanford (Coaches-2)

=== Running backs ===
- Marcus Allen, USC (Coaches-1)
- Darrin Nelson, Stanford (Coaches-1)
- Gerald Riggs, Arizona State (Coaches-1)
- Tim Harris, Washington State (Coaches-2)
- Robert Weathers, Arizona State (Coaches-2)
- Kevin Nelson, UCLA (Coaches-2)

=== Wide receivers ===
- Cormac Carney, UCLA (Coaches-1)
- Victor Simmons, Oregon State (Coaches-1)
- Paul Skansi, Washington (Coaches-2)
- Mariet Ford, California (Coaches-2)

=== Tight ends ===
- Tim Wrightman, UCLA (Coaches-1)
- Pat Beach, Washington State (Coaches-2)

=== Tackles ===
- Luis Sharpe, UCLA (Coaches-1)
- Harvey Salem, California (Coaches-1)
- Don Mosebar, USC (Coaches-2)
- John Meyer, Arizona State (Coaches-2)

=== Guards ===
- Roy Foster, USC (Coaches-1)
- Bruce Matthews, USC (Coaches-1)
- Jeff Kiewel, Arizona (Coaches-2)
- Roger Levasa, Oregon State (Coaches-2)

=== Centers ===
- Tony Slaton, USC (Coaches-1)
- John Macaulay, Stanford (Coaches-2)

== Defensive selections ==
=== Linemen ===
- Fletcher Jenkins, Washington (Coaches-1)
- George Achica, USC (Coaches-1)
- Dennis Edwards, USC (Coaches-1)
- Matt Elisara, Washington State (Coaches-1)
- Karl Morgan, UCLA (Coaches-2)
- Doug Rogers, Stanford (Coaches-2)
- Irv Eatman, UCLA (Coaches-2)
- Gary Shaw, Arizona (Coaches-2)

=== Linebackers ===
- Chip Banks, USC (Coaches-1)
- Vernon Maxwell, Arizona State (Coaches-1)
- Mark Jerue, Washington (Coaches-1)
- Ricky Hunley, Arizona (Coaches-1)
- Joey Lumpkin, Arizona State (Coaches-2)
- Dave Morze, Stanford (Coaches-2)
- Ron Rivera, California (Coaches-2)
- Mark Stewart, Washington (Coaches-2)

=== Defensive backs ===
- Mike Richardson, Arizona State (Coaches-1)
- Paul Sorensen, Washington State (Coaches-1)
- Vaughn Williams, Stanford (Coaches-1)
- Ray Horton, Washington (Coaches-1)
- Joey Browner, USC (Coaches-2)
- Tom Sullivan, UCLA (Coaches-2)
- Steve Brown, Oregon (Coaches-2)
- Kendall Williams, Arizona State (Coaches-2)

== Special teams ==
=== Placekickers ===
- Chuck Nelson, Washington (Coaches-1)
- Luis Zendejas, Arizona State (Coaches-2)

=== Punters ===
- Mike Black, Arizona State (Coaches-1)
- Sergio Vega, Arizona (Coaches-2)

=== Return specialists ===
- Anthony Allen, Washington (Coaches-1)
- Choo Choo Young, Oregon (Coaches-2)

== Key ==
Coaches = Pacific-10 head football coaches

== See also ==
- 1981 College Football All-America Team
