= Walker Lee Ashley =

American football player (born 1960)

No. 58, 54
- Position: Linebacker

Personal information
- Born: July 28, 1960 (age 66); Bayonne, New Jersey, U.S.
- Listed height: 6 ft 0 in (1.83 m)
- Listed weight: 234 lb (106 kg)

Career information
- High school: Henry Snyder (Jersey City, New Jersey)
- College: Penn State
- NFL draft: 1983: 3rd round, 73rd overall pick

Career history
- Minnesota Vikings (1983–1988); Kansas City Chiefs (1989); Minnesota Vikings (1990)

Awards and highlights
- National champion (1982); Second-team All-American (1982); First-team All-East (1982); Second-team All-East (1981)

Career NFL statistics
- Interceptions: 2
- Fumble recoveries: 1
- Touchdowns: 1
- Stats at Pro Football Reference

Walker Lee Ashley (born July 28, 1960) is an American former professional football player who was a linebacker in the National Football League (NFL) for the Minnesota Vikings and Kansas City Chiefs.

== College career ==
Ashley was a member of the 1982 Penn State National Championship team and an All American defensive end.

== Professional career ==
Ashley was selected by the Minnesota Vikings in the third round (73rd overall) of the 1983 NFL draft. He played linebacker for the Vikings from 1983 to 1988 and again in 1990 after a one-year stint with the Kansas City Chiefs in 1989.

== Personal life ==
Ashley was born in Bayonne, New Jersey. Raised in Jersey City, New Jersey, Ashley attended Henry Snyder High School.

His son, also Walker Lee Ashley, played football for the USC Trojans for one season and left the program.
