= Roy Foster (American football) =

American football player (born 1960)

No. 61, 67
- Position: Guard

Personal information
- Born: May 24, 1960 (age 66); Los Angeles, California, U.S.
- Listed height: 6 ft 4 in (1.93 m)
- Listed weight: 282 lb (128 kg)

Career information
- High school: William Howard Taft (Los Angeles, California)
- College: USC
- NFL draft: 1982: 1st round, 24th overall pick

Career history
- Miami Dolphins (1982–1990); San Francisco 49ers (1991–1993)

Awards and highlights
- 2× Pro Bowl (1985, 1986); National champion (1978); Consensus All-American (1981); First-team All-American (1980); 2× Morris Trophy (1980, 1981); 3× First-team All-Pac-10 (1979, 1980, 1981)

Career NFL statistics
- Games played: 165
- Games started: 127
- Fumble recoveries: 5
- Stats at Pro Football Reference

Roy Allen Foster (born May 24, 1960) is an American former professional football player who was an offensive lineman in the National Football League (NFL). He played college football for the USC Trojans.

== Early life ==
Foster prepped at Taft High School in Woodland Hills, California and Shawnee Mission West High School in Overland Park, Kansas.

== College career ==
Foster played for the University of Southern California (USC) and was selected to 1981 College Football All-America Team (Consensus selection), and the 1980 College Football All-America Team Foster was the first winner of The Morris Trophy for being the top offensive or defensive lineman in the Pacific-8 conference. He is one of only three Pac-12 Offensive lineman (along with Lincoln Kennedy and Alex Mack) to win the award twice.

== Professional career ==
Foster was selected 24th overall in the first round by the Miami Dolphins in the 1982 NFL draft. He was a two-time Pro Bowler, in 1985 and 1986, and played in two Super Bowls. He retired with the San Francisco 49ers in 1993. He is the only offensive lineman to have blocked for Joe Montana, Steve Young, and Dan Marino. He also caught a touchdown pass from Dan Marino. He appeared in 165 NFL games and started 127 of them. In the NFL playoffs, he appeared in 14 games and started 7 of them. In his career, he recorded 5 fumble recoveries.
