= Curt Warner =

American football player (born 1961)

No. 28, 21
- Position: Running back

Personal information
- Born: March 18, 1961 (age 65); Wyoming, West Virginia, U.S.
- Listed height: 5 ft 11 in (1.80 m)
- Listed weight: 205 lb (93 kg)

Career information
- High school: Pineville (Pineville, West Virginia)
- College: Penn State (1979–1982)
- NFL draft: 1983: 1st round, 3rd overall pick

Career history
- Seattle Seahawks (1983–1989); Los Angeles Rams (1990)

Awards and highlights
- 2× UPI AFC Offensive Player of the Year (1983, 1986); 3× Second-team All-Pro (1983, 1986, 1987); 3× Pro Bowl (1983, 1986, 1987); PFWA All-Rookie Team (1983); Seattle Seahawks Top 50 players; Seattle Seahawks Ring of Honor; National champion (1982); First-team All-American (1981); Second-team All-American (1982); First-team All-East (1982); 2× Second-team All-East (1980, 1981); State of Washington Sports Hall of Fame (2017)

Career NFL statistics
- Rushing yards: 6,844
- Rushing average: 4
- Touchdowns: 63
- Stats at Pro Football Reference
- College Football Hall of Fame

Curtis Edward Warner (born March 18, 1961) is an American former professional football player who was a running back in the National Football League (NFL). A two-time All-American playing college football for the Penn State Nittany Lions, Warner was selected by the Seattle Seahawks in the first round of the 1983 NFL draft. Warner was inducted into the College Football Hall of Fame on December 8, 2009.

Warner was the 1983 AFC Offensive Player of the Year in his rookie NFL season.

== College career ==
Warner was a standout at Pineville High School in Pineville, West Virginia, graduating in a class of only 90 students. At Pennsylvania State University, he led the Nittany Lions in rushing in 1980, 1981, and 1982, and helped them capture their first national championship in the 1983 Sugar Bowl. When his collegiate career was over, he owned 42 Penn State records (his 3,398 career rushing yards is 3rd in school history, and his 18 100-yard rushing games remains a Penn State record). On October 30, 2010, Evan Royster surpassed Warner to take over the career rushing yards record. He was named an All-American twice, in 1981 and 1982.

Warner earned a Bachelor of Arts in speech communication from Penn State in 1983.

== Professional career ==
Warner was the third overall pick of the 1983 NFL draft, selected by the Seattle Seahawks. He followed future hall of famers John Elway and Eric Dickerson.

Warner led the AFC in rushing yards his rookie season in 1983, helping Seattle to its first Conference Championship game. He became the first Seahawk to rush for at least 1,000 yards in his rookie season, followed 39 years later by Kenneth Walker III. The Seahawks lost to the Los Angeles Raiders in that season, who went on to become the league champion. The following year, Warner suffered a torn ACL in the 1984 season opener against Cleveland and was sidelined for the rest of the year. He came back in the 1985 season and had a number of successful seasons before ending his career with the Los Angeles Rams.

Warner is a three-time Pro Bowler (1983, 1986, 1987), and was inducted into the Seattle Seahawks Ring of Honor in 1994.

== Career statistics ==
Legend
	UPI AFC Offensive Player of the Year
**Bold**	Career high

=== NFL ===
==== Regular season ====
Year	Team	Games		Rushing						Receiving					Fumbles	
Year	Team	GP	GS	Att	Yds	Avg	Y/G	Lng	TD	Rec	Yds	Avg	Lng	TD	Fum	FR
1983	SEA	16	16	**335**	1,449	4.3	90.6	**60**	**13**	42	325	7.7	28	1	6	2
1984	SEA	1	1	10	40	4.0	40.0	9	0	1	19	**19.0**	19	0	0	0
1985	SEA	16	16	291	1,094	3.8	68.4	38	8	**47**	307	6.5	27	1	**8**	2
1986	SEA	16	16	319	**1,481**	**4.6**	**92.6**	**60**	**13**	41	**342**	8.3	26	0	6	**5**
1987	SEA	12	12	234	985	4.2	82.1	57	8	17	167	9.8	**30**	**2**	4	1
1988	SEA	16	16	266	1,025	3.9	64.1	29	10	22	154	7.0	17	**2**	5	1
1989	SEA	16	15	194	631	3.3	39.4	34	3	23	153	6.7	24	1	7	2
1990	LAR	7	2	49	139	2.8	19.9	9	1	0	0	0.0	0	0	1	0
Career		100	94	1,698	6,844	4.0	68.4	60	56	193	1,467	7.6	30	7	37	13

=== College ===
Year	Team	Rushing					Receiving				
Year	Team	ATT	YDS	AVG	LNG	TD	NO.	YDS	AVG	LNG	TD
1979	Penn State	84	391	4.7	21	2	10	129	12.9	62	1
1980	Penn State	196	922	4.7	53	6	13	92	7.1	35	0
1979	Penn State	171	**1,044**	**6.1**	**69**	**8**	9	106	11.8	26	0
1982	Penn State	**198**	1,041	5.3	46	**8**	**24**	**335**	**14.0**	**69**	**5**
Totals		649	3,398	5.2	69	24	56	662	11.8	69	6

== After football ==
Warner owned Curt Warner Chevrolet, an automobile dealership in Vancouver, Washington, from 1999 until 2010. He is the current running backs coach at Camas High School in Camas, Washington and founder and president of the Curt Warner Autism Foundation.

Warner and his wife Ana have three sons, Jonathan, twins Austin and Christian, and a daughter, Isabella.

In 2018, Little A published The Warner Boys: Our Family's Story of Autism and Hope, written by Curt Warner and Ana Warner with Dave Boling. The book explores Warner's family life, including how it has been impacted by having twin boys (Austin and Christian) severely impacted by autism.
