= Dave Rimington =

American football player and administrator (born 1960)

No. 64, 52, 50
- Position: Center

Personal information
- Born: May 22, 1960 (age 66); Omaha, Nebraska, U.S.
- Listed height: 6 ft 3 in (1.91 m)
- Listed weight: 288 lb (131 kg)

Career information
- High school: Omaha South
- College: Nebraska (1979–1982)
- NFL draft: 1983: 1st round, 25th overall pick

Career history

Playing
- Cincinnati Bengals (1983–1987); Philadelphia Eagles (1988–1989)

Operations
- Nebraska (2017) (Interim athletic director)

Awards and highlights
- PFWA All-Rookie Team (1983); 2× Outland Trophy (1981, 1982); Lombardi Award (1982); UPI Lineman of the Year (1982); 2× Unanimous All-American (1981, 1982); Big Eight Offensive Player of the Year (1981); 2× First-team All-Big Eight (1981, 1982); Second-team All-Big Eight (1980); Second-team AP All-Time All-American (2025); Nebraska Cornhuskers Jersey No. 50 retired

Career NFL statistics
- Games played: 86
- Games started: 80
- Fumble recoveries: 6
- Stats at Pro Football Reference
- College Football Hall of Fame

David Brian Rimington (born May 22, 1960) is an American former professional football player who was a center in the National Football League (NFL) for seven seasons during the 1980s. Rimington played college football at Nebraska, where he was two-time consensus All-American and received several awards recognizing him as the best college lineman in the country. He was selected in the first round of the 1983 NFL draft and played professionally for the Cincinnati Bengals and Philadelphia Eagles of the NFL. Rimington is the namesake of the Rimington Trophy, which is awarded annually to the nation's top collegiate center.

== College career ==
Rimington attended the University of Nebraska–Lincoln, where he was a consensus First-team All-American in 1981 and 1982. In 1981, he was named the UPI Big Eight Player-of-the-Year and the AP Big Eight Offensive Player of the Year, the only time in Big Eight Conference history that a lineman was so honored. In 1982, he was the Big Eight (all sports) Athlete of the Year and UPI National Lineman of the year. In 1983 he was an NCAA Top Five winner.

Rimington won the Outland Trophy, given to the nation's top interior offensive or defensive lineman, in 1981 and 1982 and is the only two-time winner of the award. He also won the Lombardi Award in 1982, and placed fifth in the balloting for the Heisman Trophy that same year. He and Orlando Pace are the only three-time winners in the Outland/Lombardi category. Rimington is one of only thirteen players in NCAA history have won both of these awards.

Rimington's #50 jersey was retired by Nebraska in 1982. In 1994, he was named to the FWAA 1969-1994 All-America Team, one of just twenty-five athletes named to that team. He was inducted into the College Football Hall of Fame in 1997. He was selected to the Nebraska All-Century Football Team via fan poll in 1999, and named to the All-Century Nebraska football team by Gannett News Service. In 2002, he was named to the Athlon Sports Nebraska All-Time Team. He was named to the Orange Bowl's 75th Anniversary All-Time Team in 2008.

Rimington was a first-team academic All-American in 1981 and 1982. In 2004, he was inducted into the CoSIDA Academic All-America Hall of Fame.

== Collegiate all-century teams ==
In 1999, Rimington was selected as the starting offensive center by Sports Illustrated in their "NCAA Football All-Century Team", and was also selected as the starting offensive center to the Walter Camp Football Foundation All Century Team. Rimington is the only center named to both the Sports Illustrated and Walter Camp All-Century teams.

== Professional career ==
Rimington was selected 25th overall in the first round of the 1983 NFL draft by the Cincinnati Bengals. He played five seasons with the Bengals and two with the Philadelphia Eagles before retiring at the end of the 1989 NFL season.

== Rimington Trophy ==
The Rimington Trophy is named in his honor and since 2000 has been given annually to the nation's top collegiate center. The sculptor of the Rimington Trophy is Marc Mellon, who is also the sculptor of the NBA MVP Trophy.

== Personal ==
Following his professional career, Rimington has served with the Boomer Esiason Foundation in their fight against cystic fibrosis. He has been with the foundation since 1993 and has been president since 1995.

Rimington served as the interim athletic director of the Nebraska Cornhuskers from September 26, 2017, to October 23, 2017, when the former AD Bill Moos was named to the position.

Rimington is a member of Lambda Chi Alpha.
