= Roger Levasa =

American football player (born 1959)

No. 56
- Position: Center

Personal information
- Born: May 18, 1959 (age 67); Long Beach, California, U.S.
- Listed height: 6 ft 1 in (1.85 m)
- Listed weight: 250 lb (113 kg)

Career information
- High school: Long Beach (CA) Poly
- College: Oregon State
- NFL draft: 1982: undrafted

Career history
- Oakland Invaders (1983–1984); Portland Breakers (1985)

Awards and highlights
- 2× Second-team All-Pac-10 (1980, 1981)

Lohia Roger Levasa (born May 18, 1959) is an American former football offensive lineman. He played in the United States Football League (USFL) for the three years with the Oakland Invaders and Portland Breakers. Levasa played college football at Oregon State (1978–1981) and started 37 games during his career. He prepped at Long Beach Polytechnic High School.

Levasa resides in Tualatin, Oregon, where he is associate pastor at Horizon Community Church.
