= George Achica =

American Samoan gridiron football player (born 1960)

No. 75, 62
- Positions: Defensive tackle, nose tackle

Personal information
- Born: December 19, 1960 (age 65); American Samoa
- Listed height: 6 ft 5 in (1.96 m)
- Listed weight: 310 lb (141 kg)

Career information
- High school: Andrew Hill (San Jose, California, U.S.)
- College: USC
- NFL draft: 1983: 3rd round, 57th overall pick

Career history
- Baltimore Colts (1983)*; Los Angeles Express (1983-1985); Indianapolis Colts (1985); New York Jets (1986)*; San Francisco 49ers (1987)*
- * Offseason or practice squad member only

Awards and highlights
- Morris Trophy (1982); Consensus All-American (1982); Second-team All-American (1981); 3× First-team All-Pac-10 (1980, 1981, 1982)

Career NFL statistics
- Games played: 4
- Stats at Pro Football Reference

George R. Achica (born December 19, 1960) is an American former professional football player who was a defensive tackle in the National Football League (NFL) and United States Football League (USFL). Achica played professionally for the Los Angeles Express of the USFL and Indianapolis Colts of the NFL. He played college football for the USC Trojans, and was recognized as a consensus All-American.

== Early life ==
Achica was born in American Samoa on December 19, 1960. He attended Andrew Hill High School in San Jose, California where he was an All-American in both football and wrestling. In football, Achica was voted to the 1978 Parade All-America High School Football team as a senior. In wrestling, he won two California high school state titles as a sophomore and junior. In his senior season, Achica lost in the semi-finals of the state tournament, his first wrestling loss of his high school career.

== College career ==
Achica played football at the University of Southern California (USC) from 1979 to 1982. Achica joined USC as they were ranked #1 in the preseason AP poll. He saw playing time as a freshman and USC won their second straight Rose Bowl, defeating Ohio State 17–16. As a sophomore, Achica was named to the 1980 All-PAC-10 First-Team.

In his junior season, Achica was named to the 1981 All-PAC-10 First-Team while gaining an All-America Second-Team selection. During his that season, Achica blocked a field goal in USC's game against rival UCLA that he later said was one of his most important football performances. With four seconds remaining, and USC leading 22–21, Achica blocked Norm Johnson's 46-yard field goal attempt, denying UCLA a trip to the Rose Bowl.

As a senior, Achica was selected to his third All-PAC-10 First-Team and was named a consensus All-American. He also won the 1982 Morris Trophy, as the PAC-10 Conference's best defensive lineman. Achica was the first of four Samoans to be selected as All-Americans at USC; the others being Junior Seau, Troy Polamalu, and Lofa Tatupu.

== Professional career ==
Achica was selected by the Los Angeles Express of the newly-formed USFL in the 1983 USFL territorial draft on January 4, 1983. At the 1983 NFL draft in April, Achica was selected in the third round with the 57th overall pick by the Baltimore Colts. Achica chose to play for the Express, citing a desire to remain close to home on the west coast.

=== USFL career ===
Achica joined the Express in the middle of their 1983 season. He played in six games, starting five. In 1984, the Express added quarterback Steve Young. The team went from one of the worst in the league to earning a spot in the USFL Western Conference championship, which they lost to the Arizona Wranglers. In the 1984 season, Achica had five sacks and played in all 18 games. In what became the USFL's final season, Achica again played in all 18 games of the Express's 1985 season. He recorded seven sacks. In three seasons in the USFL, Achica played in 42 games and had 64 tackles, 12 sacks, and one fumble recovery.

=== NFL career ===
After the USFL folded, Achica joined the Colts for the 1985 NFL season. The team had relocated to Indianapolis in 1984, but the Colts still retained Achica's NFL playing rights after drafting him in 1983. Achica's time with Indianapolis was short. He suffered a knee injury early in the season, which placed him on the injured reserve list. He appeared in four games before being released in November 1985.

Achica was signed by the New York Jets on March 25, 1986, but failed his physical examination and was cut on May 21, 1986.

In July 1987, Achica signed with the San Francisco 49ers before being cut by the team on August 28, 1987.
