= Jeremiah Castille =

American football player

No. 23, 28
- Position: Cornerback

Personal information
- Born: January 15, 1961 (age 65); Columbus, Georgia, U.S.
- Listed height: 5 ft 10 in (1.78 m)
- Listed weight: 175 lb (79 kg)

Career information
- High school: Central (Phenix City, Alabama)
- College: Alabama
- NFL draft: 1983: 3rd round, 72nd overall pick

Career history
- Tampa Bay Buccaneers (1983–1986); Denver Broncos (1987–1988)

Awards and highlights
- First-team All-American (1982); 2× First-team All-SEC (1981, 1982)

Career NFL statistics
- Interceptions: 14
- Fumble recoveries: 4
- Touchdowns: 1
- Stats at Pro Football Reference

Jeremiah Castille (/kɑːsˈtiːl/ kahs-TEEL; born January 15, 1961) is an American former professional football player who was a cornerback in the National Football League (NFL). He played college football for the Alabama Crimson Tide, earning first-team All-American honors in 1982. Castille was selected by the Tampa Bay Buccaneers in the third round of the 1983 NFL draft with the 72nd overall pick. He played in six seasons in the NFL -- from 1983-1988 for the Buccaneers and Denver Broncos. Castille's best season as a pro was in 1985, when he recorded 7 interceptions. He finished his career with 14 interceptions, which he returned for 207 yards. He also had 3 fumble recoveries.

Castille played college football at the University of Alabama and was on the last Crimson Tide team coached by Bear Bryant. Castille was a pallbearer at Bryant's funeral on January 28, 1983. Castille played for Alabama from 1979–1982, recording a school record 16 interception. In the 1982 Liberty Bowl at the end of the season, Castille intercepted three passes in a 21–15 win and was selected as the game's MVP.

While playing for the Broncos during the 1987 AFC Championship Game versus the Cleveland Browns, Castille is remembered for stripping the ball from Browns' running back Earnest Byner and recovering it in a play called "The Fumble". He also recorded an interception in Super Bowl XXII, although this is not as widely remembered because his team ended up losing 42–10.

Two of Castille's sons, Tim and Simeon, also played in the NFL after playing college football at Alabama. His third son Caleb walked on at Alabama before quitting football to chase his dream of becoming a professional actor and starring as Jeremiah's teammate at Alabama, Tony Nathan in the movie Woodlawn.
