= Mark Robinson (safety) =

American football player (born 1962)

No. 30
- Position: Safety

Personal information
- Born: September 13, 1962 (age 64); Washington, D.C., U.S.
- Listed height: 5 ft 11 in (1.80 m)
- Listed weight: 206 lb (93 kg)

Career information
- High school: Kennedy (Silver Spring, Maryland)
- College: Penn State
- NFL draft: 1984: 4th round, 90th overall pick

Career history
- Kansas City Chiefs (1984–1987); Tampa Bay Buccaneers (1988–1991)

Awards and highlights
- National champion (1982); First-team All-American (1982); 2× First-team All-East (1981, 1982)

Career NFL statistics
- Interceptions: 15
- Fumble recoveries: 6
- Sacks: 4.5
- Stats at Pro Football Reference

Mark Leon Robinson (born September 13, 1962) is an American former professional football player who was a safety for nine seasons in the National Football League (NFL). He played college football for the Penn State Nittany Lions, earning first-team All-American honors in 1982. He was selected by the Kansas City Chiefs in the fourth round of the 1984 NFL draft with the 90th overall pick. He played in the NFL for the Chiefs and Tampa Bay Buccaneers.

Robinson is currently the color analyst for radio broadcasts of University of South Florida Bulls football games. He also co-hosts a Tampa Bay Buccaneer fan show called "Xtra Point" on Spectrum Sports Florida. He also co-owns Safety Harbor Montessori, a private school located in Clearwater, Florida.
