= Reggie Roby =

American football player (1961–2005)

- Roby with the Miami Dolphins in 1989

No. 4, 1, 7
- Position: Punter

Personal information
- Born: July 30, 1961; Waterloo, Iowa, U.S.
- Died: February 22, 2005 (aged 43); Nashville, Tennessee, U.S.
- Listed height: 6 ft 3 in (1.91 m)
- Listed weight: 258 lb (117 kg)

Career information
- High school: East (Waterloo)
- College: Iowa (1979–1982)
- NFL draft: 1983: 6th round, 167th overall pick

Career history
- Miami Dolphins (1983–1992); Washington Redskins (1993–1994); Tampa Bay Buccaneers (1995); Houston / Tennessee Oilers (1996–1997); San Francisco 49ers (1998)

Awards and highlights
- 2× First-team All-Pro (1984, 1994); Second-team All-Pro (1991); 3× Pro Bowl (1984, 1989, 1994); PFWA All-Rookie Team (1983); NFL 1980s All-Decade Team; Consensus All-American (1981); Second-team All-American (1982); 2× First-team All-Big Ten (1981, 1982); Second-team All-Big Ten (1979); Second-team AP All-Time All-American (2025)

Career NFL statistics
- Punts: 992
- Punting yards: 42,951
- Punting average: 43.3
- Stats at Pro Football Reference

Reginald Henry Roby (July 30, 1961 – February 22, 2005) was an American professional football player who was a punter in the National Football League (NFL) for 16 seasons during the 1980s and 1990s. He played college football for the Iowa Hawkeyes and was recognized as a consensus All-American. He played for the Miami Dolphins, Washington Redskins, Tampa Bay Buccaneers, Houston/Tennessee Oilers, and San Francisco 49ers of the NFL. Roby died of a heart attack at his Nashville home in 2005.

== Early life ==
Roby was born in Waterloo, Iowa. In addition to playing high school football, he was also a standout pitcher on the Waterloo East High School baseball team, and was drafted by Major League Baseball's Cincinnati Reds. Instead, he chose to attend college.

== College career ==
Roby attended the University of Iowa, where he played for the Hawkeyes from 1979 to 1982. Despite the fact that he had experience at quarterback and possessed a strong arm, Hawkeyes head coach Hayden Fry made the 6'4", 250-pounder a punter and kick-off specialist, also using him for long range field goals. Before Roby arrived, the Hawkeyes had not had a winning season in 20 years. With Roby, the 1981 team earned its first Rose Bowl invitation in 23 years on the strength of a 6–2 conference record (8–4 overall) and co-Big Ten championship with Ohio State. Roby set an NCAA season record with a 49.8-yard average. In 1982, he led the nation with a 48.1-yard average. His career average of 45.4 yards ranks among college football's best.

Reggie was also given the kick off duties and routinely kicked the ball through the uprights at Iowa, a total of 26 times. He was 28-34 for PAT's and was 11–27 in FG attempts, mostly from long range.

== Professional career ==
Roby was selected by the Miami Dolphins in the 6th round (167th overall) of the 1983 NFL Draft. Roby's 38.7 net average led the league in 1986, and his 45.7 average yards led the NFL in 1991, and he set a Pro Bowl record with 10 punts in the 1985 game. His 58.5-yard single-game average on September 28, 1986, remains a Dolphin team record. At Rich Stadium, Roby punted the ball a team record 77 yards. He completed the only pass attempt of his career, a 48-yarder to John Booty in 1995. He was selected as a punter for the NFL's 1980s All-Decade Team. In the Dolphins 1992 divisional round 31–0 win over the San Diego Chargers, he planted 4 of his 8 punts inside the Chargers 20-yard line, including 3 inside the 7. Roby played in Super Bowl XIX with the Dolphins, though he had a below-average day, averaging just 39.3 yards per kick and failing to put any of his 7 punts inside the 20. "I was trying to kill the ball, and I kicked it bad", said Roby after the game. "I didn't hit one well. I was scared -- scared to make a mistake. It was the worst game of my life, counting high school, college, counting everything." Dolphins coach Don Shula said following the game "We're supposed to have the best punter in the football, but today, he didn't punt like he was the best." However, it is notable that despite Miami's #1 ranked offense during the 1984 season, which set numerous NFL records, he still made the Pro Bowl that year.

Roby played sixteen seasons in the NFL and had 992 punts for 42,951 yards. His career yards per punt average was 43.3, with a net average of 36.2. He had 298 punts beyond the 20-yard line and 112 touchbacks. Roby helped popularize the now-standard two-step approach and often wore a watch to gauge his hangtime. He was one of a handful of African American kickers in National Football League history. He was one of the only kickers, to this day, to punt the ball without jumping.

In 1993, Roby's financial difficulties led to his filing for bankruptcy. The Miami Dolphins had cut him after the 1992 season largely because a corollary of this filing would have meant he could have become a free agent and left Miami at any point of the following season, but he continued to play professionally until 1998 and later became marketing and development director for Backfield in Motion, a non-profit group mixing athletics and academics to help inner city boys.

=== Career statistics ===
Legend
| | Led the league |
| **Bold** | Career high |

Regular season

| Season | Team | GP | Punting | | | | | |
| Season | Team | GP | Punts | Yards | Y/P | Net | In20 | TB |
|---|---|---|---|---|---|---|---|---|
| 1983 | MIA | 16 | 74 | 3,189 | 43.1 | 36.5 | **26** | 11 |
| 1984 | MIA | 16 | 51 | 2,281 | 44.7 | 38.1 | 15 | 10 |
| 1985 | MIA | 16 | 59 | 2,576 | 43.7 | 34.7 | 19 | 8 |
| 1986 | MIA | 15 | 56 | 2,476 | 44.2 | 37.4 | 13 | 9 |
| 1987 | MIA | 10 | 32 | 1,371 | 42.8 | **38.2** | 8 | 3 |
| 1988 | MIA | 15 | 64 | 2,754 | 43.0 | 35.2 | 18 | 9 |
| 1989 | MIA | 16 | 58 | 2,458 | 42.4 | 35.3 | 18 | 6 |
| 1990 | MIA | 16 | 72 | 3,022 | 42.0 | 35.6 | 20 | 3 |
| 1991 | MIA | 16 | 54 | 2,466 | **45.7** | 36.4 | 17 | 7 |
| 1992 | MIA | 9 | 35 | 1,443 | 41.2 | 34.3 | 11 | 3 |
| 1993 | WAS | 15 | 78 | 3,447 | 44.2 | 37.2 | 25 | 10 |
| 1994 | WAS | 16 | **82** | **3,639** | 44.4 | 36.1 | 21 | **12** |
| 1995 | TB | 16 | 77 | 3,296 | 42.8 | 36.2 | 23 | 7 |
| 1996 | HOU | 16 | 67 | 2,973 | 44.4 | 38.0 | 25 | 7 |
| 1997 | TEN | 16 | 73 | 3,049 | 41.8 | 35.6 | 25 | 1 |
| 1998 | SF | 14 | 60 | 2,511 | 41.9 | 34.3 | 14 | 6 |
| Career | | 238 | 992 | 42,951 | 43.3 | 36.2 | 298 | 112 |

== Death ==
On February 22, 2005, Roby's son, Julian, found him without a pulse in their Nashville home. The cause of death, although not officially reported, was believed to be a heart attack. He left behind four children and his wife Melissa.

In the days after his death, former Miami Dolphins head coach Don Shula praised Reggie Roby, saying "his booming kicks often helped us win the field position battle."
