= David Galloway (American football) =

American football player (born 1959)

No. 65, 99
- Positions: Defensive end, defensive tackle, nose tackle

Personal information
- Born: February 16, 1959 (age 67); Tampa, Florida, U.S.
- Listed height: 6 ft 3 in (1.91 m)
- Listed weight: 225 lb (102 kg)

Career information
- High school: Brandon (FL)
- College: Florida
- NFL draft: 1982: 2nd round, 38th overall pick

Career history
- St. Louis/Phoenix Cardinals (1982–1989); Denver Broncos (1990–1991)

Awards and highlights
- First-team All-American (1981); First-team All-SEC (1981); Second-team All-SEC (1980); University of Florida Athletic Hall of Fame

Career NFL statistics
- Games played: 99
- Games started: 76
- Quarterback sacks: 38
- Fumbles recovered: 5
- Stats at Pro Football Reference

David Lawrence Galloway (born February 16, 1959) is an American former professional football player who was a defensive end for 10 seasons in the National Football League (NFL) during the 1980s and early 1990s. Galloway played college football for the Florida Gators, earning All-American honors. A second-round pick in the 1982 NFL draft, he played professionally for the St. Louis/Phoenix Cardinals and the Denver Broncos of the NFL.

== Early life ==
Galloway was born in Tampa, Florida in 1959. Both of Galloway's parents died before he was 10 years old, and he was cared for by his two older sisters. He attended Brandon High School in Brandon, Florida, where he was a standout high school football player for the Brandon Eagles. Galloway was six feet, three inches tall and weighed 225 pounds in high school; he was a dominating athlete in basketball, football and track. As a senior for the Eagles in 1977, he was an all-state, prep All-American defensive lineman in football, led Hillsborough County in basketball dunks, and helped the Brandon Eagles to an 18–2 conference basketball title, and threw the shot and discus for the track team.

== College career ==
Galloway accepted an athletic scholarship to attend the University of Florida in Gainesville, Florida, where he played defensive end and defensive tackle for coach Doug Dickey and coach Charley Pell's Florida Gators football teams from 1978 to 1981. During Galloway's junior season in 1980, he was a member of the Gators team that posted the biggest one-year turnaround in the history of NCAA Division I football—from 0–10–1 in 1979 to an 8–4 bowl team in 1980.

He was recognized as a second-team All-Southeastern Conference (SEC) selection and an honorable mention All-American in 1980. As a senior team captain in 1981, Galloway was a first-team All-SEC selection, and a Football Writers Association of America first-team All-American. He was later inducted into the University of Florida Athletic Hall of Fame as a "Gator Great." In one of a series of articles written for The Gainesville Sun in 2006, the newspaper's sports editors rated him as No. 48 among the top 100 players of the Florida Gators' first 100 seasons.

== Professional career ==
The St. Louis Cardinals selected Galloway in the second round (38th pick overall) of the 1982 NFL Draft, and he played eight seasons for the Cardinals from 1982 to 1989, and one final season for the Denver Broncos in 1990. He played in ninety-nine games, started seventy-six of them, and recorded thirty-eight quarterback sacks and five recovered fumbles in his nine-season NFL career.

== Life after football ==
Galloway is married, and he and his wife Josie have led a marriage ministry together for seven years. They have three sons. Galloway currently works as a licensed real estate agent in the Miami/Fort Lauderdale, Florida area.

== See also ==
- 1981 College Football All-America Team
- Florida Gators football, 1970–79
- Florida Gators football, 1980–89
- List of Florida Gators football All-Americans
- List of Florida Gators in the NFL draft
- List of University of Florida alumni
- List of University of Florida Athletic Hall of Fame members
