= Terry Crouch =

American football player (1959–2011)

No. 75, 69
- Position: Guard

Personal information
- Born: July 6, 1959; Dallas, Texas, U.S.
- Died: May 8, 2011 (aged 51); Dallas, Texas, U.S.
- Listed height: 6 ft 2 in (1.88 m)
- Listed weight: 278 lb (126 kg)

Career information
- High school: Skyline (Dallas, Texas)
- College: Oklahoma
- NFL draft: 1982: 5th round, 113th overall pick

Career history
- Baltimore Colts (1982); Los Angeles Express (1984)

Awards and highlights
- Consensus All-American (1981); 2× First-team All-Big Eight (1980, 1981)

Career NFL statistics
- Games played: 9
- Games started: 6
- Stats at Pro Football Reference

Terry Crouch (July 6, 1959 – May 8, 2011) was an American professional football offensive lineman. He played for the Oklahoma Sooners from 1978 to 1981 and the Baltimore Colts in 1982.

Crouch died after a long illness in 2011.
