= Ron Sams =

American football player (born 1961)

No. 70, 67
- Positions: Center, guard

Personal information
- Born: April 12, 1961 (age 65); Bridgeville, Pennsylvania, U.S.
- Listed height: 6 ft 3 in (1.91 m)
- Listed weight: 261 lb (118 kg)

Career information
- College: Pittsburgh
- NFL draft: 1983: 6th round, 160th overall pick

Career history
- Green Bay Packers (1983); Minnesota Vikings (1984); New York Jets (1986)*
- * Offseason or practice squad member only

Awards and highlights
- First-team All-East (1982)

Career NFL statistics
- Games played: 15
- Games started: 10
- Stats at Pro Football Reference

Ron Sams (born April 12, 1961) is a former center and guard in the National Football League (NFL).

== Early life and college career ==
Sams was born in Bridgeville, Pennsylvania.

He played at the collegiate level at the University of Pittsburgh.

== Professional career ==
Sams was selected in the sixth round of the 1983 NFL draft by the Green Bay Packers and played that season with the team. The following season, he would play with the Minnesota Vikings until being traded to the New York Jets which he only played for during the preseason. He retired in 1986.
