= Chip Banks =

American football player (born 1959)

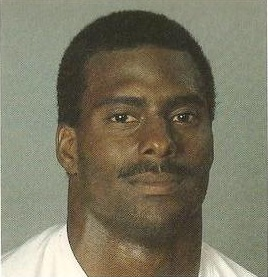
- Banks in 1985

No. 56, 51
- Position: Linebacker

Personal information
- Born: September 18, 1959 (age 67); Lawton, Oklahoma, U.S.
- Listed height: 6 ft 4 in (1.93 m)
- Listed weight: 233 lb (106 kg)

Career information
- High school: Laney (Augusta, Georgia)
- College: USC
- NFL draft: 1982: 1st round, 3rd overall pick

Career history
- Cleveland Browns (1982–1986); San Diego Chargers (1987); Indianapolis Colts (1989–1993)

Awards and highlights
- NFL Defensive Rookie of the Year (1982); First-team All-Pro (1983); 4× Pro Bowl (1982, 1983, 1985, 1986); National champion (1978); First-team All-American (1981); Third-team All-American (1980); 2× First-team All-Pac-10 (1980, 1981); Second-team All-Pac-10 (1979)

Career NFL statistics
- Sacks: 46
- Interceptions: 9
- Touchdowns: 1
- Stats at Pro Football Reference

William "Chip" Banks (born September 18, 1959) is an American former professional football player who was a linebacker in the National Football League (NFL). He played college football for the USC Trojans. A four-time Pro Bowl selection with the Cleveland Browns, he was named an All-Pro in 1983. He also played for the San Diego Chargers and Indianapolis Colts.

== Early life and college ==
Banks graduated from Lucy Craft Laney High School in Augusta, Georgia. He played college football at the University of Southern California (USC), from which he graduated in 1981.

== Professional career ==
Banks was drafted by the Cleveland Browns with the third overall pick in the 1982 NFL draft. He was awarded the NFL Rookie of the Year Award and was a four-time AFC Pro Bowler (1982, 1983, 1985, 1986) with the Cleveland Browns. Banks was traded to the San Diego Chargers on April 28, 1987, as part of a deal that saw the Browns and Chargers swap first- and second-round selections in the 1987 NFL draft. Banks expected to get a new contract from San Diego and when the Chargers demanded he play out his under-market deal from Cleveland, Banks angrily refused to report again and sat out the entire 1988 season. He was traded to the Indianapolis Colts and played there for four seasons before retiring after the 1992 season.

=== NFL statistics ===
Year	Team	Games	Combined tackles	Tackles	Assisted tackles	Sacks	Forced fumbles	Fumble recoveries	Fumble return yards	Interceptions	Interception return yards	Yards per interception return	Longest interception return	Interceptions returned for touchdown
1982	CLE	9	0	0	0	5.5	0	0	0	1	14	14	14	0
1983	CLE	16	0	0	0	4.0	0	1	0	3	95	32	65	1
1984	CLE	16	0	0	0	2.5	0	3	17	1	8	8	8	0
1985	CLE	16	0	0	0	11.0	0	0	0	0	0	0	0	0
1986	CLE	16	0	0	0	4.5	0	2	0	0	0	0	0	0
1987	SD	12	0	0	0	3.0	0	2	0	1	20	20	20	0
1989	IND	10	0	0	0	1.0	0	1	0	2	13	7	11	0
1990	IND	16	0	0	0	4.5	0	1	0	0	0	0	0	0
1991	IND	11	0	0	0	1.0	0	0	0	0	0	0	0	0
1992	IND	16	0	0	0	9.0	0	1	0	1	3	3	3	0
Total	Total	138	0	0	0	46.0	0	11	17	9	153	17	65	1

== Personal life ==
On June 6, 1994, Banks was involved in an auto accident when his car crossed a median and hit a car driven by Mattie Lee Chaney in a head-on collision that resulted in the death of Chaney. He was charged with second degree vehicular homicide along with giving false information to officers and driving without a license.

In 2020, Banks was shot in an Atlanta area home; while he was in serious condition, he eventually recovered from his injuries.
