= Sal Sunseri =

American football player and coach (born 1959)

Personal information
- Born: August 1, 1959 (age 67)

Career information
- High school: Central Catholic (Pittsburgh, Pennsylvania)
- College: Pittsburgh
- NFL draft: 1982: 10th round, 267th overall pick

Career history

Playing
- Pittsburgh Steelers (1982)*
- * Offseason or practice squad member only

Coaching
- Pittsburgh (1985–1991) Defensive line coach & linebackers coach; Pittsburgh (1992) Assistant head coach & interim head coach; Iowa Wesleyan (1993) Assistant head coach, defensive coordinator, special teams coach; Illinois State (1994) Defensive coordinator; Louisville (1995–1997) Linebackers coach; Alabama A&M (1998–1999) Defensive coordinator & linebackers coach; LSU (2000) Linebackers coach & special teams coach; Michigan State (2001) Linebackers coach & special teams coach; Carolina Panthers (2002–2008) Defensive line coach; Alabama (2009–2011) Assistant head coach & linebackers coach; Tennessee (2012) Defensive coordinator; Florida State (2013–2014) Defensive ends coach; Oakland Raiders (2015–2017) Linebackers coach; Florida (2018) Defensive line coach; Alabama (2019–2021) Outside linebackers coach; Alabama (2022) Special assistant to the head coach; Colorado (2023) Defensive tackles coach

Awards and highlights
- 4× National (2009, 2011, 2013, 2020); Consensus All-American (1981); First-team All-East (1981)

Head coaching record
- Regular season: NCAA: 0–1 (.000)

Salvatore Howard Sunseri (born August 1, 1959) is an American college and professional football coach who most recently served as the defensive tackles coach for the University of Colorado of the Pac-12 Conference. Sunseri played college football for the University of Pittsburgh, where he was an All-American linebacker. Sunseri produced at least one Pro Bowl player in four of five seasons as NFL defensive line coach, highlighted by Julius Peppers's three consecutive trips to Hawaii from 2004 to 2006.

== Playing career ==
Sunseri attended the University of Pittsburgh, where he played for the Pittsburgh Panthers football team from 1978 to 1981. After beginning his career as a walk-on, Sunseri was a three-year starter and anchored a defense that led the NCAA in total defense in both 1980 and 1981. During his senior year, he was named a team captain and a consensus first-team All-American.

After graduating, he was selected by the Pittsburgh Steelers in the tenth round of t he 1982 NFL draft; however, he suffered a career ending knee injury during training camp and was given an injury settlement and released from the team.

== Coaching career ==
Between 1985 and 1992, Sunseri worked as a defensive line and linebacker's coach for his alma mater, the University of Pittsburgh. After Paul Hackett was fired as the team's head coach during Pittsburgh's 1992 season, Sunseri was promoted as an interim head coach for the final game versus Hawaiʻi—a 36–23 loss for the Panthers.

After having previously worked as the defensive line coach for the NFL's Carolina Panthers for six seasons, Sunseri returned to college football on January 21, 2009, when he was named as the outside linebackers coach for the Alabama Crimson Tide football team. Sunseri was a 2011 finalist for the Broyles Award, given annually to the nation's top college football assistant coach.

In December 2012, Sunseri accepted a job as a defensive assistant at Florida State University. Sunseri helped coach Florida State to the 2013 BCS National Championship.

In January 2015, Sunseri accepted the position of linebackers coach with the Oakland Raiders.

After one season serving as the Defensive line coach for the Florida Gators, Sunseri accepted an undisclosed position with the Alabama Crimson Tide.

== Personal life ==
Sunseri is married to Roxann Sunseri (née Evans), who is a former varsity gymnast at Pittsburgh. The couple has two daughters and two sons. His son, Tino played quarterback for the Saskatchewan Roughriders of the CFL. His younger son, Vinnie, played safety for the San Francisco 49ers.

== Head coaching record ==
Year	Team	Overall	Conference	Standing	Bowl/playoffs
Pittsburgh Panthers (Big East Conference) (1992)
1992	Pittsburgh	0–1	0–0	6th	
Pittsburgh:		0–1	0–0		
Total:		0–1			
