= Tom Flynn (American football) =

American football player (born 1962)

No. 41, 28
- Position: Safety

Personal information
- Born: March 24, 1962 (age 64); Verona, Pennsylvania, U.S.
- Listed height: 6 ft 0 in (1.83 m)
- Listed weight: 195 lb (88 kg)

Career information
- High school: Penn Hills (Pittsburgh, Pennsylvania)
- College: Pittsburgh
- NFL draft: 1984: 5th round, 126th overall pick

Career history
- Green Bay Packers (1984–1986); New York Giants (1986-1988)

Awards and highlights
- Super Bowl champion (XXI); Second-team All-American (1983); 2× Second-team All-East (1981, 1982)

Career NFL statistics
- Interceptions: 11
- Fumble recoveries: 4
- Touchdowns: 3
- Stats at Pro Football Reference

Thomas Jeffery Flynn (born March 24, 1962) is an American former professional football player who was a safety in the National Football League (NFL).

Flynn was born in Verona, Pennsylvania, just outside of Pittsburgh, and played scholastically at Penn Hills High School. He played collegiately at Pitt, and was a second-team All-American as a senior.

Flynn was selected by the Green Bay Packers in the fifth round of the 1984 NFL draft. In his rookie season he led the NFC in interceptions with nine, and was voted Pro Football Weekly's NFL Defensive Rookie of the Year. He was unexpectedly cut by the Packers early in the 1986 season but was signed by the New York Giants soon after. He is remembered by the Giants for his big play in the last game of the 1986 season, against the Packers, where he exacted revenge on his old team by blocking a punt and returning it for a touchdown.

As of 2016, Flynn resides in Murrysville, Pennsylvania with his wife and four children: Zach, Jake, Jillian, and Zane.
