= Dennis Fowlkes =

American football player (born 1961)

No. 50, 52
- Position: Linebacker

Personal information
- Born: March 11, 1961 (age 65); Columbus, Ohio, U.S.

Career information
- High school: East (Columbus)
- College: West Virginia

Career history
- Minnesota Vikings (1983–1985)*; Miami Dolphins (1987)
- * Offseason or practice squad member only

Awards and highlights
- 2× Second-team All-East (1981, 1982)
- Stats at Pro Football Reference

Dennis Fowlkes (born March 11, 1961) is an American former professional football player who was a linebacker for the Minnesota Vikings and Miami Dolphins of the National Football League (NFL). He played college football for the West Virginia Mountaineers.
