= Chuck Nelson =

American football player (born 1960)

No. 13, 1
- Position: Placekicker

Personal information
- Born: February 23, 1960 (age 66); Seattle, Washington, U.S.
- Listed height: 5 ft 11 in (1.80 m)
- Listed weight: 175 lb (79 kg)

Career information
- High school: Everett (Everett, Washington)
- College: Washington
- NFL draft: 1983: 4th round, 87th overall pick

Career history
- Los Angeles Rams (1983); Buffalo Bills (1984); Minnesota Vikings (1986−1988)

Awards and highlights
- Unanimous All-American (1982); 3× First-team All-Pac-10 (1980, 1981, 1982); Washington MVP (1982)

Career NFL statistics
- Field goals: 63/93 (.677)
- Extra points: 175/184 (.951)
- Points scored: 364
- Stats at Pro Football Reference

Charles LaVerne Nelson (born February 23, 1960) is an American former professional football player who was a placekicker for five seasons in the National Football League (NFL). Nelson played college football for the Washington Huskies, earning unanimous All-American honors in 1982. He played in the NFL with the Los Angeles Rams, Buffalo Bills, and Minnesota Vikings. Following his playing career, Nelson worked in investment management and broadcasting in the Seattle area. He did local cable telecasts and was the color commentator on radio for Husky football games for 17 years, through the 2009 season. Nelson was the director of the Boeing Classic golf tournament on the Champions Tour for its first five years, and was named president and CEO of the Washington Athletic Club in January 2012.

Born in Seattle, Washington, Nelson grew up in Everett and graduated from Everett High School in 1978. He then attended the University of Washington, where he played for the football team from 1979 to 1982. As a senior in 1982, he was recognized as a consensus first-team All-American. He was selected in the fourth round of the 1983 NFL draft by the Los Angeles Rams, the 87th overall pick.

Nelson was inducted into the UW Husky Hall of Fame in 1998.

== See also ==
- Washington Huskies football statistical leaders
