= 1981 All-SEC football team =

American college football all-star team

The 1981 All-SEC football team consists of American football players selected to the All-Southeastern Conference (SEC) chosen by various selectors for the 1981 NCAA Division I-A football season. Alabama and Georgia shared the conference title.

== Offensive selections ==
=== Receivers ===
- Wamon Buggs, Vanderbilt (AP-1, UPI)
- Lindsay Scott, Georgia (AP-1, UPI)
- Orlando McDaniel, LSU (AP-2)
- Anthony Hancock, Tennessee (AP-2)

=== Tight ends ===
- Malcolm Scott, LSU (AP-1)
- Bart Krout, Alabama (UPI)
- Jerry Price, Miss. St. (AP-2)

=== Tackles ===
- Keith Uecker, Auburn (AP-1, UPI)
- Bob Cayavec, Alabama (AP-2, UPI)
- Pat Phenix, Ole Miss (AP-1)
- Lole Hudgins, Vanderbilt (AP-2)

=== Guards ===
- Ken Hammond, Vanderbilt (AP-1, UPI)
- Wayne Harris, Miss. St. (AP-1, UPI)
- Jimmy Harper, Georgia (AP-2)
- Doug Vickers, Alabama (AP-2)

=== Centers ===
- Lee North, Tennessee (AP-1, UPI)
- Steve Mott, Alabama (AP-2)
- Joe Happe, Georgia (AP-2)

=== Quarterbacks ===
- Buck Belue, Georgia (AP-1, UPI)
- Whit Taylor, Vanderbilt (AP-2)

=== Running backs ===
- Herschel Walker, Georgia (College Football Hall of Fame) (AP-1, UPI)
- James Jones, Florida (AP-1, UPI)
- Michael Haddix, Miss. St. (AP-2)
- Ronnie Stewart, Georgia (AP-2)

== Defensive selections ==
=== Ends ===
- Billy Jackson, Miss. St. (AP-1, UPI)
- Mike Pitts, Alabama (AP-1)
- Don Fielder, Kentucky (AP-2)
- Steve Bearden, Vanderbilt (AP-2)

=== Tackles ===
- David Galloway, Florida (AP-1, UPI)
- Glen Collins, Miss. St. (AP-1, UPI)
- Jimmy Payne, Georgia (AP-1)
- Donnie Humphrey, Auburn (AP-2)
- Edmund Nelson, Auburn (AP-2)

=== Middle guards ===
- Warren Lyles, Alabama (AP-1, UPI)
- Eddie Weaver, Georgia (AP-2, UPI [as end])

=== Linebackers ===
- Danny Skutack, Auburn (AP-1, UPI)
- Johnie Cooks, Miss. St. (AP-1, UPI)
- Tom Boyd, Alabama (AP-2, UPI)
- Wilber Marshall, Florida (AP-1)
- Albert Richardson, LSU (AP-2)
- Robbie Jones, Alabama (AP-2)
- Tommy Thurson, Georgia (AP-2)
- Fernando Jackson, Florida (AP-2)

=== Backs ===
- Tommy Wilcox, Alabama (AP-1, UPI)
- Jeremiah Castille, Alabama (AP-1)
- Andy Molls, Kentucky (AP-1)
- Jim Bob Harris, Alabama (UPI)
- Rob Fesmire, Miss. St. (UPI)
- Tyrone King, Alabama (UPI)
- Tony Lilly, Florida (AP-2)
- Bill Bates, Tennessee (AP-2)
- Bob Harris, Auburn (AP-2)

== Special teams ==
=== Kicker ===
- Kevin Butler, Georgia (AP-2, UPI)
- Brian Clark, Florida (AP-1)

=== Punter ===
- Jim Arnold, Vanderbilt (AP-1, UPI)
- Jimmy Colquitt, Tennessee (AP-2)

== Key ==
AP = Associated Press

UPI = United Press International

Bold = Consensus first-team selection by both AP and UPI

== See also ==
- 1981 College Football All-America Team
