= Ricky Hunley =

American football player and coach (born 1961)

Arizona Wildcats
- Title: Defensive tackles coach

Personal information
- Born: November 11, 1961 (age 64); Petersburg, Virginia, U.S.
- Listed height: 6 ft 2 in (1.88 m)
- Listed weight: 242 lb (110 kg)

Career information
- High school: Petersburg (VA)
- College: Arizona
- NFL draft: 1984: 1st round, 7th overall pick

Career history

Playing
- Cincinnati Bengals (1984)*; Denver Broncos (1984–1987); Phoenix Cardinals (1988); Los Angeles Raiders (1989–1990); Indianapolis Colts (1991)*
- * Offseason or practice squad member only

Coaching
- USC (1992–1993) Graduate assistant; Missouri (1994–1997) Defensive line coach; Missouri (1998–2000) Associate head coach & linebackers coach; Florida (2001) Defensive line coach; Washington Redskins (2002) Defensive line coach; Cincinnati Bengals (2003–2007) Linebackers coach; California Redwoods / Sacramento Mountain Lions (2009–2011) Defensive coordinator; Oakland Raiders (2011) Assistant linebackers coach; Football University (2012-13) Lead coach and instructor; Memphis (2014–2015) Defensive line coach; Arizona (2021–present) Defensive line coach/Defensive tackle coach

Awards and highlights
- Unanimous All-American (1983); Consensus All-American (1982); Pac-10 Co-Defensive Player of the Year (1983); 3× First-team All-Pac-10 (1981, 1982, 1983); Arizona Wildcats Jersey No. 89 retired

Career NFL statistics
- Sacks: 2.5
- Fumble recoveries: 2
- Interceptions: 3
- Stats at Pro Football Reference
- College Football Hall of Fame

Ricky Cardell Hunley (born November 11, 1961) is an American football coach and former professional player who was a linebacker in the National Football League (NFL) for seven seasons during the 1980s and early 1990s. Hunley played college football for the University of Arizona, and was twice recognized as a consensus All-American. He was selected in the first round of the 1984 NFL draft, and played professionally for the Denver Broncos, Arizona Cardinals and Los Angeles Raiders of the NFL. He is currently the defensive line coach at the University of Arizona in Tucson, his alma mater.

== Early life ==
Hunley was born in Petersburg, Virginia, and graduated from Petersburg High School.

== College playing career ==
Hunley attended the University of Arizona, where he played for the Arizona Wildcats football team from 1980 to 1983. As a junior in 1982 and again as a senior in 1983, he was recognized as a consensus first-team All-American—and became the first Arizona Wildcat football player to receive consensus All-American honors.

In 1998, he was inducted into the College Football Hall of Fame–the first player from the University of Arizona to be enshrined.

== Professional playing career ==
Hunley went on to an NFL career with the Denver Broncos (1984–87), Phoenix Cardinals (1988), and the Los Angeles Raiders (1989–90). It is noted that Hunley was drafted by the Bengals but after failing to reach a contract agreement was traded to Denver. Hunley played in both Super Bowl XXI and Super Bowl XXII for the Broncos. He was elected executive vice president of the NFL Players Association (1990–92).

== Coaching career ==
Hunley coached on the collegiate level at the University of Southern California (1992–93), University of Missouri (1994–2000), University of Florida (2001), and the University of Memphis (2014-15). He helped the Florida Gators win the BCS FedEx 2002 Orange Bowl. In his first two coaching gigs, he worked under head coach Larry Smith.

Hunley started his NFL coaching career through the NFL Minority Fellowship Coaching Program in 2002 as the defensive line coach for the Washington Redskins under Steve Spurrier, following Spurrier to the pros after his final season with Florida. While with Washington, Hunley first met defensive coordinator Marvin Lewis. Hunley became Linebackers coach under Lewis when Lewis became the head coach of the Cincinnati Bengals from 2003 to 2007.

In 2005, Hunley helped the Bengals ended 15 years of futility by notching their first winning season since 1990 and winning the AFC North division title with an 11–5 record. Two years later in 2007, he was fired after a disappointing season and a flurry of player injuries and suspensions. During his time in the NFL, he also served on the board of directors for the Black Coaches Association.

Hunley eventually returned to college football, coaching for two seasons (2014–15) with the Memphis Tigers. In 2015, Hunley helped the Tigers post a 9-4 record, and an appearance in the Birmingham Bowl.

On December 30, 2020, Hunley joined Jedd Fisch's coaching staff as defensive line coach at the University of Arizona, his alma mater.

== Personal life ==
Hunley and his wife Camille have two daughters. His younger brother, Lamonte, was also an All-American linebacker at Arizona. He founded the Ricky Hunley Football Camp, a non-profit instruction center for high school boys.
