= Darryl Talley =

American football player (born 1960)

- Talley (left) and Oliver Luck celebrate West Virginia's 1981 Peach Bowl victory

No. 56, 99, 55
- Position: Linebacker

Personal information
- Born: July 10, 1960 (age 66); Cleveland, Ohio, U.S.
- Listed height: 6 ft 4 in (1.93 m)
- Listed weight: 235 lb (107 kg)

Career information
- High school: Shaw (East Cleveland, Ohio)
- College: West Virginia
- NFL draft: 1983: 2nd round, 39th overall pick

Career history
- Buffalo Bills (1983–1994); Atlanta Falcons (1995); Minnesota Vikings (1996)

Awards and highlights
- 2× First-team All-Pro (1990, 1993); 2× Pro Bowl (1990, 1991); Buffalo Bills Wall of Fame; Buffalo Bills 50th Anniversary Team; Unanimous All-American (1982); 3× First-team All-East (1980, 1981, 1982)

Career NFL statistics
- Tackles: 1,252
- Sacks: 38.5
- Forced fumbles: 17
- Fumble recoveries: 14
- Interceptions: 12
- Defensive touchdowns: 2
- Stats at Pro Football Reference
- College Football Hall of Fame

Darryl Victor Talley (born July 10, 1960) is an American former professional football player who was a linebacker in the National Football League (NFL) for 14 seasons during the 1980s and 1990s. He played college football for West Virginia University, and was recognized as an All-American. Talley played professionally for the Buffalo Bills, Atlanta Falcons and Minnesota Vikings of the NFL, and played in four Super Bowls with the Bills.

== College career ==
Talley played college football at West Virginia University. Many college programs were pushed away from him, because he played fullback and linebacker at Shaw High School in East Cleveland, never settling on either position. He also missed his last seven high school games with a broken ankle.

Talley was a starter from 1979 to 1982 and led the Mountaineers to the Peach Bowl in 1981 and the 1982 Gator Bowl in 1982. Against Pitt, he intercepted Dan Marino to set up a Mountaineer field goal and blocked a punt and returned it for a touchdown. As a senior in 1982, he was selected as West Virginia's third-ever consensus All-American. He started the season off with a win over Oklahoma and was named WVU's season MVP and was named All-American. He also played in the 1983 Hula Bowl.

=== Legacy ===
Talley's five tackles-for-a-loss against Penn State stand as a single-game record and his personal-best 15 tackles against Boston College won Sports Illustrated Player of the Week honors. For his career, he had 282 unassisted tackles (first all-time), 202 assisted tackles (second), 28 tackles-for-loss (second) and 19 sacks (fourth). During his four-year career, he recorded a school record of 484 career tackles; which has been passed by Grant Wiley.

Talley was named to the 2008 College Football Hall of Fame ballot for nominees for induction, and was inducted in 2011 He is also a member of the West Virginia University Sports Hall of Fame.

== Professional career ==
Talley played in the National Football League for 14 seasons and played in four Super Bowls. He never missed a game in his 12-years with the Buffalo Bills. Jim Kelly, the Bills' Hall of Fame quarterback considers Talley his most underrated teammate and believes that Talley should also be enshrined in the Pro Football Hall of Fame.

=== Buffalo Bills ===
Talley was selected in the second round of the 1983 NFL draft by the Bills and played in Buffalo for 12 seasons. He is the Bills' all-time leading tackler with 1,137, and also recorded 38.5 sacks, 12 interceptions for 189 return yards and 3 touchdowns, and 14 fumble recoveries for 76 return yards. He averaged 120 tackles, 3.5 sacks and 6.2 takeaways per season and his mark of 188 regular season games played ranks fifth-most in team history.

While with the Bills, Talley had multiple nicknames on the field as "the Duke of Awesome", "Spider-Man", and "the Hammer". His cheering section at Rich Stadium was known as the "Talley-Whackers". On November 4, 1990, playing against the Cleveland Browns in his hometown, Talley returned an interception for his first career touchdown. After the season, he received the Ed Block Courage Award.

In 2003, Talley became the 20th member on the Wall of Fame in Ralph Wilson Stadium.

=== Later career ===
Talley left the Bills to play with the Falcons in the 1995 campaign and then with the Vikings. He left Atlanta on a less than stellar note when it was discovered that he played his last game in Atlanta with a loaded U-Haul truck in the parking lot. He had it so he could go home to spend the holiday with his family once the game was over. He ended his career after the 1996 season and won the Ralph C. Wilson, Jr. Distinguished Service Award in 2000.

== NFL career statistics ==
=== Regular season ===
Legend
	Led the league
**Bold**	Career high

Year	Team	Games		Tackles					Fumbles				Interceptions			
Year	Team	GP	GS	Sck	Cmb	Solo	Ast	Sfty	FF	FR	Yds	TD	Int	Yds	TD	PD
1983	BUF	16	0	5.0	39	39	—	0	1	**2**	6	0	0	0	0	0
1984	BUF	16	16	5.0	84	84	—	0	2	1	0	0	1	0	0	0
1985	BUF	16	5	2.0	43	43	—	0	0	0	0	0	0	0	0	0
1986	BUF	16	16	3.0	116	116	—	0	0	1	**47**	0	0	0	0	0
1987	BUF	12	12	1.0	79	79	—	0	0	1	0	0	0	0	0	0
1988	BUF	16	15	2.5	73	73	—	0	2	1	0	0	0	0	0	0
1989	BUF	16	16	**6.0**	97	97	—	0	0	0	0	0	0	0	0	0
1990	BUF	16	16	4.0	123	123	—	0	0	1	4	0	2	60	**1**	0
1991	BUF	16	16	4.0	117	117	—	0	**5**	**2**	0	0	**5**	45	0	0
1992	BUF	16	16	4.0	106	106	—	0	2	0	0	0	0	0	0	0
1993	BUF	16	16	2.0	**136**	**136**	—	0	4	**2**	4	0	3	**74**	**1**	0
1994	BUF	16	16	0.0	115	82	**33**	0	1	1	2	0	0	0	0	0
1995	ATL	16	15	0.0	73	54	19	0	2	**2**	12	0	0	0	0	0
1996	MIN	12	12	0.0	51	41	10	0	0	0	0	0	1	10	0	0
Career		216	187	38.5	1,252	1,190	62	0	19	14	76	0	12	189	2	0

=== Postseason ===
Year	Team	Games		Tackles					Fumbles				Interceptions			
Year	Team	GP	GS	Sck	Cmb	Solo	Ast	Sfty	FF	FR	Yds	TD	Int	Yds	TD	PD
1988	BUF	2	2	1.0	0	—	—	0	0	0	0	0	0	0	0	0
1989	BUF	1	1	1.0	0	—	—	0	0	0	0	0	0	0	0	0
1990	BUF	3	3	0.0	1	1	—	0	0	0	0	0	**2**	**48**	**1**	0
1991	BUF	3	3	1.0	4	4	—	0	0	0	0	0	0	0	0	0
1992	BUF	4	4	**2.5**	2	2	—	0	**1**	**1**	**4**	0	0	0	0	0
1993	BUF	3	3	1.0	**8**	**8**	—	0	0	0	0	0	0	0	0	0
1995	ATL	1	1	0.0	1	1	—	0	0	0	0	0	0	0	0	0
1996	MIN	1	1	0.0	6	4	**2**	0	0	**1**	0	0	0	0	0	0
Career		18	18	6.5	22	20	2	0	1	2	4	0	2	48	1	0

== Personal life ==
On June 2, 2008 Talley commented that former Bills kicker Scott Norwood should be inducted onto the Bills' Wall of Fame. He stated:

"One thing I wish people would take a look at is out of all the things that we accomplished we wouldn't have done a lot of them without Scott Norwood". He continued on, "Everybody seems to have forgotten Scott. If you look back in the early days we won a lot of games with special teams and him kicking field goals. So I think there's somewhere up there (the Wall) for Scott to be, but nobody wants to acknowledge him because he missed a kick. But as I recall, I missed some tackles in that game, Bruce missed some. Thurman dropped some balls and Jim threw interceptions, but nobody realizes that here is a guy that made major contributions to what this organization was about. It just irks me that people have forgotten him." [sic]

He now lives in Orlando, Florida with his wife Janine, who is a popular social media user, and their two kids.

Talley is the brother of Cleveland Brown John Talley and is the cousin of New York Yankee Derek Jeter.

Talley was named to the Buffalo Bills 50th Anniversary All-Time Team in 2009.

A 2014 report in The Buffalo News revealed that Talley had suffered brain damage, which Talley suspects stems from his playing days and manifests itself as severe depression.

On July 3, 2021 Wheeling, WV newspaper The Intelligencer published that Talley's number would be retired at the Mountaineers' Home Game of October 2, 2021, .
