= Tim Wrightman =

American football player (born 1960)

No. 81, 80
- Position: Tight end

Personal information
- Born: March 27, 1960 (age 66); Los Angeles, California, U.S.
- Listed height: 6 ft 3 in (1.91 m)
- Listed weight: 237 lb (108 kg)

Career information
- High school: Mary Star of the Sea (Los Angeles)
- College: UCLA
- NFL draft: 1982: 3rd round, 62nd overall pick

Career history
- Chicago Blitz (1983); Arizona Wranglers (1984); Chicago Bears (1985–1986)

Awards and highlights
- Super Bowl champion (XX); Unanimous All-American (1981); 2× First-team All-Pac-10 (1980, 1981)

Career NFL statistics
- Receptions: 46
- Receiving yards: 648
- Receiving touchdowns: 1
- Stats at Pro Football Reference

Timothy Jon Wrightman (born March 27, 1960) is an American former professional football player who was a tight end. He played for two seasons for the Chicago Bears of the National Football League (NFL).

Wrightman played college football for the UCLA Bruins and was drafted 62nd overall in the third round by the Chicago Bears in the 1982 NFL draft. A contract dispute with the Bears led him to sign with the Chicago Blitz of the United States Football League (USFL), thus making him the first NFL draft pick who signed with the now defunct USFL. He later rejoined the NFL and won a Super Bowl ring as a member of the storied 1985 Bears team, and was re-signed to a two-year deal in 1986.

Wrightman also holds several acting credits, with appearances in Baywatch, Get Smart, Exit to Eden, and Renegade.
