= Gerry Raymond =

American football player (born 1959)

No. 65
- Position: Offensive guard

Personal information
- Born: June 6, 1959 (age 67); Lewiston, Maine, U.S.
- Listed height: 6 ft 3 in (1.91 m)
- Listed weight: 260 lb (118 kg)

Career information
- High school: Lewiston
- College: Boston College
- NFL draft: 1982: 4th round, 102nd overall pick

Career history
- New York Giants (1982)*; Baltimore Colts (1982); Boston/New Orleans/Portland Breakers (1983–1985); New Orleans Saints (1986)
- * Offseason or practice squad member only

Awards and highlights
- 2× All-USFL (1984–1985); Third-team All-American (1981); First-team All-East (1981)

Gerard Leo Raymond (born June 6, 1959) is an American former professional football offensive guard who played for the Boston/New Orleans/Portland Breakers of the United States Football League (USFL). He played college football for the Boston College Eagles and was selected by the New York Giants in the fourth round of the 1982 NFL draft.

== Early life ==
Gerard Leo Raymond was born on June 6, 1959, in Lewiston, Maine. He attended Lewiston High School.

== College career ==
Raymond enrolled at Boston College to play college football for the Eagles. He was a four-year letterman from 1978 to 1981. As a senior in 1981, he earned Associated Press (AP) third-team All-American and AP first-team All-East honors.

== Professional career ==
Raymond was selected by the New York Giants in the fourth round, with the 102nd overall pick, of the 1982 NFL draft. He was waived on September 6 before the start of the 1982 regular season.

Raymond was claimed off waivers by the Baltimore Colts on September 7. He was active for three games but did not play. An additional seven games were cancelled due to the 1982 NFL players strike. Raymond was released by the Colts on November 24, 1982.

On December 22, 1982, Raymond signed with the Boston Breakers of the upstart United States Football League (USFL) for the 1983 USFL season. He started all 18 games for the Breakers in 1983, earning College & Pro Football Newsweekly All-USFL honors as the team finished with an 11–7 record. He started all 18 games for the newly renamed New Orleans Breakers in 1984, garnering The Sporting News All-USFL recognition as the Breakers went 8–10. He played in 15 of 18 games for the Portland Breakers in 1985. The USFL folded after the 1985 season.

Raymond signed with the New Orleans Saints on May 17, 1986. On August 18, it was reported that he had been placed on injured reserve. He was waived in late October 1986.
