= Tommy Wilcox =

American college football player (born 1959)

Profile
- Position: Defensive back

Personal information
- Born: July 30, 1959 (age 67); Harahan, Louisiana, U.S.

Career information
- College: Alabama

Career history
- 1979–1982: Alabama Crimson Tide
- 1983: Arizona Wranglers
- 1984: Chicago Blitz

Awards and highlights
- National champion (1979); Consensus All-American (1981); Second-team All-American (1980); 2× First-team All-SEC (1980, 1981); 2× Second-team All-SEC (1979, 1982)

Tommy Wilcox (born July 30, 1959) is an American television personality and former college football player. He played defensive back for the University of Alabama Crimson Tide from 1979 through 1982 and was a member of the 1979 national championship team and was a consensus selection to the 1981 College Football All-America Team. Presently Wilcox serves as the host of a hunting and fishing show entitled "Tommy Wilcox Outdoors."

== Playing career ==
A native of Harahan, Louisiana, Wilcox played high school football for Alfred Bonnabel High School. In 1977, a year in which the New Orleans area featured three outstanding quarterbacks in Wilcox, Bobby Hebert, and John Fourcade, he led Bonnabel to the state championship game. From there, he went to play for Bear Bryant at Alabama. Wilcox started at safety for his first season and was named SEC Freshman of the Year for his overall performance. In recognition for his play during his sophomore and junior years, Wilcox was a First Team All-SEC selection. After his junior year, Wilcox was named as a consensus selection to the 1981 College Football All-America Team. In recognition of his career with the Crimson Tide, Wilcox was selected to Alabama's Team of the Century in 1992.

Although he was a consensus selection to the All-America Team, Wilcox went undrafted and was not signed as an undrafted free agent after the 1983 NFL draft. Although he wanted to be drafted by the Birmingham Stallions as part of the 1983 USFL Territorial Draft, the Stallions passed on Wilcox citing his speed and size. He was subsequently signed by the Arizona Wranglers where he was a defensive starter for their 1983 season. He played for the Chicago Blitz in 1984, but was forced to retire that season after he suffered a serious neck injury.

== Later life ==
After his playing career, Wilcox became a teacher and football coach at Hillcrest High School in Tuscaloosa, Alabama and later was a pharmaceutical sales representative. In the mid-1990s, Wilcox began to film his hunting and fishing show entitled "Tommy Wilcox Outdoors" and in the time since has filmed hundreds of episodes that also include famous sports personalities.
