= Rob Fada =

American football player (born 1961)

No. 92, 64, 65
- Position: Guard

Personal information
- Born: May 7, 1961 (age 65); Fairborn, Ohio, U.S.
- Listed height: 6 ft 2 in (1.88 m)
- Listed weight: 265 lb (120 kg)

Career information
- High school: Park Hills (Fairborn)
- College: Pittsburgh
- NFL draft: 1983: 9th round, 230th overall pick

Career history
- Chicago Bears (1983–1984); Kansas City Chiefs (1985)

Awards and highlights
- 2× Second-team All-East (1981, 1982)

Career NFL statistics
- Games played: 24
- Games started: 4
- Stats at Pro Football Reference

Rob Fada (born May 17, 1961) is an American former professional football player who was a guard in the National Football League (NFL). He played college football for the Pittsburgh Panthers. Fada played in the NFL for the Chicago Bears from 1983 to 1984 and for the Kansas City Chiefs in 1985. He was selected by the Chicago Bears in the 9th round (230th overall) of the 1983 NFL Draft.
