= Mike Pitts =

American football player (1960–2021)

No. 74, 93
- Position: Defensive end

Personal information
- Born: September 25, 1960; Pell City, Alabama, U.S.
- Died: November 4, 2021 (aged 61); Talladega, Alabama, U.S.
- Listed height: 6 ft 5 in (1.96 m)
- Listed weight: 277 lb (126 kg)

Career information
- High school: Baltimore Polytechnic Institute (Baltimore, Maryland)
- College: Alabama
- NFL draft: 1983: 1st round, 16th overall pick

Career history

Playing
- Atlanta Falcons (1983–1986); Philadelphia Eagles (1987–1992); New England Patriots (1993–1994)

Coaching
- Cleveland Browns (2000) Defensive assistant

Awards and highlights
- PFWA All-Rookie Team (1983); National champion (1979); Consensus All-American (1982); 2× First-team All-SEC (1981, 1982)

Career NFL statistics
- Tackles: 814
- Sacks: 48.5
- Fumble recoveries: 15
- Stats at Pro Football Reference

Michael Anthony Pitts (September 25, 1960 – November 4, 2021) was an American professional football player who was a defensive end in the National Football League (NFL) for twelve seasons during the 1980s and 1990s. He played college football for the University of Alabama, and was recognized as an All-American. He was selected 16th overall in the first round of the 1983 NFL draft, and played professionally for the Atlanta Falcons, Philadelphia Eagles, and New England Patriots of the NFL.
