= 1982 All-America college football team =

Official list of the best college football players of 1982

The 1982 All-America college football team is composed of college football players who were selected as All-Americans by various organizations and writers that chose College Football All-America Teams in 1982. The National Collegiate Athletic Association (NCAA) recognizes four selectors as "official" for the 1982 season. They are: (1) the American Football Coaches Association (AFCA) based on the input of more than 2,000 voting members; (2) the Associated Press (AP) selected based on the votes of sports writers at AP newspapers; (3) the Football Writers Association of America (FWAA) selected by the nation's football writers; and (4) the United Press International (UPI). Other selectors included Football News (FN), the Gannett News Service (GNS), the Newspaper Enterprise Association (NEA), The Sporting News (TSN), and the Walter Camp Football Foundation (WC).

Thirteen players were unanimously selected as first-team All-Americans by all four official selectors. They were:

1. Jim Arnold, punter for Vanderbilt
2. Anthony Carter, wide receiver for Michigan, consensus first-team All-American in both 1981 and 1982 and the 1982 winner of the Chicago Tribune Silver Football as the Most Valuable Player in the Big Ten Conference
3. Eric Dickerson, running back for SMU who rushed for 1,617 yards in 1982
4. John Elway, quarterback for Stanford, the 1982 recipient of the Sammy Baugh Trophy
5. Gordon Hudson, tight end for BYU
6. Terry Kinard, defensive back for Clemson, a consensus All-American in both 1981 and 1982 and the CBS National Defensive Player of the Year in 1982
7. Steve Korte, offensive lineman for Arkansas
8. Don Mosebar, offensive lineman for USC
9. Chuck Nelson, placekicker for Washington
10. Dave Rimington, center for Nebraska, two-time winner of the Outland Trophy and the namesake of the Rimington Trophy, which is awarded annually to the nation's top collegiate center
11. Herschel Walker, running back for Georgia, a three-time consensus first-team All-American who finished second in the Heisman Trophy voting in 1981 and won the award in 1982
12. Billy Ray Smith Jr., defensive end for Arkansas and who was a consensus first-team All-American in both 1981 and 1982
13. Darryl Talley, linebacker for West Virginia

== Consensus All-Americans ==
The following charts identify the NCAA-recognized consensus All-Americans for the year 1982 and displays which first-team designations they received.

=== Offense ===
Name	Position	School	Number	Official	Other
Eric Dickerson	Running back	SMU	4/5/9	AFCA, AP, FWAA, UPI	FN, GNS, NEA, TSN, WC
John Elway	Quarterback	Stanford	4/5/9	AFCA, AP, FWAA, UPI	FN, GNS, NEA, TSN, WC
Herschel Walker	Running back	Georgia	4/5/9	AFCA, AP, FWAA, UPI	FN, GNS, NEA, TSN, WC
Anthony Carter	Wide receiver	Michigan	4/5/9	AFCA, AP, FWAA, UPI	FN, GNS, NEA, TSN, WC
Dave Rimington	Center	Nebraska	4/5/9	AFCA, AP, FWAA, UPI	FN, GNS, NEA, TSN, WC
Bruce Matthews	Guard	USC	3/5/8	AFCA, AP, UPI	FN, GNS, NEA, TSN, WC
Steve Korte	Guard	Arkansas	4/3/7	AFCA, AP, FWAA, UPI	GNS, NEA, TSN
Gordon Hudson	Tight end	BYU	4/2/6	AFCA, AP, FWAA, UPI	TSN, WC
Don Mosebar	Tackle	USC	4/2/6	AFCA, AP, FWAA, UPI	FN, WC
Jimbo Covert	Tackle	Pittsburgh	3/3/6	AFCA, FWAA, UPI	FN, GNS, WC
Mike Rozier	Running back	Nebraska	3/1/4	AFCA, FWAA, UPI	FN

=== Defense ===
Name	Position	School	Number	Official	Other
Terry Kinard	Defensive back	Clemson	4/5/9	AFCA, AP, FWAA, UPI	FN, GNS, NEA, TSN, WC
Billy Ray Smith Jr.	Defensive end	Arkansas	4/5/9	AFCA, AP, FWAA, UPI	FN, GNS, NEA, TSN, WC
Darryl Talley	Linebacker	West Virginia	4/4/8	AFCA, AP, FWAA, UPI	FN, GNS, NEA, TSN
Vernon Maxwell	Defensive end	Arizona St.	3/5/8	AFCA, FWAA, UPI	FN, GNS, NEA, TSN, WC
Terry Hoage	Def. back	Georgia	3/4/7	AFCA, AP, UPI	GNS, NEA, TSN, WC
Mike Pitts	Def. tackle	Alabama	3/3/6	AFCA, FWAA, UPI	FN, NEA, TSN
Mike Richardson	Def. back	Arizona State	3/3/6	AFCA, AP, UPI	FN, TSN, WC
George Achica	Middle guard	USC	2/4/6	AP, UPI	FN, NEA, TSN, WC
Ricky Hunley	Linebacker	Arizona	3/0/3	AFCA, AP, UPI	-
Marcus Marek	Linebacker	Ohio State	2/1/3	AFCA, UPI	WC
Wilber Marshall	Linebacker	Florida	2/1/3	AP, FWAA	GNS
Gabriel Rivera	Def. tackle	Texas Tech	2/1/3	AFCA, AP	GNS
Rick Bryan	Def. tackle	Oklahoma	2/0/2	FWAA, UPI	-

=== Special teams ===
Name	Position	School	Number	Official	Other
Chuck Nelson	Placekicker	Washington	4/5/9	AFCA, AP, FWAA, UPI	FN, GNS, NEA, TSN, WC
Jim Arnold	Punter	Vanderbilt	4/2/4	AFCA, AP, FWAA, UPI	FN, NEA, TSN

== Offense ==
=== Receivers ===
- Anthony Carter, Michigan (CFHOF) (AFCA, AP-1, FWAA, UPI-1, FN-1, GNS-1, NEA-1, TSN, WC)
- Kenny Jackson, Penn State (AP-1, UPI-2)
- Trumaine Johnson, Grambling (GNS-3, NEA-2, TSN)
- Willie Gault, Tennessee (AP-3, FN-2, GNS-2, NEA-1)
- Henry Ellard, Fresno State (AP-2, GNS-1)
- Chris Castor, Duke (AP-2, FN-3)
- Stanley Washington, TCU (GNS-2)
- Cormac Carney, UCLA (FN-2, NEA-2)
- Mike Martin, Illinois (AP-3, GNS-3)

=== Tight ends ===
- Gordon Hudson, BYU (CFHOF) (AFCA, AP-1, FWAA, UPI-1, FN-3, TSN, WC)
- Tony Hunter, Notre Dame (GNS-2, NEA-1)
- David Lewis, California (GNS-1, NEA-2)
- Allama Matthews, Vanderbilt (AP-2, UPI-2, FN-1)
- Darren Long, Long Beach State (AP-3)
- Chris Dressel, Stanford (GNS-3)

=== Tackles ===
- Don Mosebar, Southern California (AFCA, AP-1, FWAA, UPI-1, FN-1, GNS-2, WC)
- Jimbo Covert, Pittsburgh (CFHOF) (AFCA, AP-2, FWAA, UPI-1, FN-1, GNS-1, NEA-2, WC)
- Bill Fralic, Pittsburgh (CFHOF) (AP-1, NEA-1)
- Harvey Salem, California (AP-2, FN-3, GNS-2, TSN)
- Chris Hinton, Northwestern (UPI-2, GNS-1, NEA-2, TSN)
- Karl Nelson, Iowa State (NEA-1)
- Randy Theiss, Nebraska (AP-3)
- Maceo Fifer, Houston (UPI-2)
- Robert Oxendine, Duke (AP-3, FN-2)
- Joe Beazley, Alabama (FN-2)
- Pat Phenix, Mississippi (FN-3)
- Eric Moran, Washington (GNS-3)
- Alfred Mohammad, Arkansas (GNS-3)

=== Guards ===
- Steve Korte, Arkansas (AFCA, AP-1, FWAA, UPI-1, FN-2, GNS-1, NEA-1, TSN)
- Bruce Matthews, USC (AFCA, AP-1, UPI-1, FN-1, GNS-1, NEA-1, TSN, WC)
- Dave Drechsler, North Carolina (AP-2, FWAA, UPI-2, FN-1, NEA-2, WC)
- Joe Lukens, Ohio State (AP-2, UPI-2)
- Paul Parker, Oklahoma (FN-2)
- Tom Thayer, Notre Dame (GNS-2)
- Jeff Kiewel, Arizona (GNS-2)
- Stefan Humphries, Michigan (NEA-2)
- Wayne Harris, Mississippi State (CFHOF) (AP-3, FN-3)
- Dave Schreck, Air Force (AP-3)
- Dennis Engel, Stanford (FN-3)
- Rob Fada, Pittsburgh (GNS-3)
- Steve Cox, Tulsa (GNS-3)

=== Centers ===
- Dave Rimington, Nebraska (CFHOF) (AFCA, AP-1, FWAA, UPI-1, FN-1, GNS-1, NEA-1, TSN, WC)
- Bart Oates, Brigham Young (AP-2, NEA-2)
- Wayne Radloff, Georgia (UPI-2, GNS-3)
- Steve Mott, Alabama (FN-2)
- Robin Ham, West Texas State (GNS-2)
- Tony Slaton, USC (AP-3)
- Tom Dixon, Michigan (FN-3)

=== Quarterbacks ===
- John Elway, Stanford (CFHOF) (AFCA, AP-1, FWAA, UPI-1, FN-1, GNS-1, NEA-1, TSN, WC)
- Tom Ramsey, UCLA (AP-2, UPI-2, FN-2)
- Tony Eason, Illinois (AP-3, FN-3, GNS-2, NEA-2)
- Doug Flutie, Boston College (CFHOF) (GNS-3)

=== Running backs ===
- Herschel Walker, Georgia (CFHOF) (AFCA, AP-1, FWAA, UPI-1, FN-1, GNS-1, NEA-1, TSN, WC)
- Eric Dickerson, SMU (CFHOF) (AFCA, AP-1, FWAA, UPI-1, FN-1, GNS-1, NEA-1, TSN, WC)
- Mike Rozier, Nebraska (CFHOF) (AFCA, AP-2, FWAA, UPI-1, FN-1, GNS-2, NEA-2)
- Ernest Anderson, Oklahoma State (AP-2, UPI-2, FN-2, GNS-3, WC)
- Curt Warner, Penn State (CFHOF) (UPI-2, FN-3, NEA-2)
- Tim Spencer, Ohio State (UPI-2, FN-3)
- James Jones, Florida (FN-3, GNS-2)
- Marcus Dupree, Oklahoma (AP-3, FN-2)
- Craig James, SMU (AP-3, FN-2)
- Mike Gunter, Tulsa (GNS-3)

== Defense ==
=== Defensive ends ===
- Billy Ray Smith Jr., Arkansas (CFHOF) (AFCA, AP-1, FWAA, UPI-1, FN-1, GNS-1, NEA-1 [LB], TSN, WC)
- Vernon Maxwell, Arizona State (AFCA, AP-2 [LB], FWAA [LB], UPI-1, FN-1, GNS-1 [LB], NEA-1 [LB], TSN, WC)
- William Fuller, North Carolina (CFHOF) (AP-2 [DT], FWAA, FN-1)
- Charles Benson, Baylor (AP-2, UPI-2, GNS-1, NEA-1)
- Jody Schulz, East Carolina (AP-3, GNS-2)
- Walker Lee Ashley, Penn State (UPI-2, GNS-3)
- Michael Walter, Oregon (GNS-2)
- Reggie Singletary, Kansas State (FN-2, GNS-2, NEA-2)
- Kiki DeAyala, Texas (AP-3)
- Carl Banks, Michigan State (FN-3)
- Reggie White, Tennessee (FN-3)

=== Defensive tackles ===
- Mike Pitts, Alabama (AFCA, AP-2 [DE], FWAA, UPI-1, FN-1, GNS-3 [DE], NEA-1 [DE], TSN)
- Rick Bryan, Oklahoma (AP-2, FWAA, UPI-1, FN-2, GNS-2)
- Gabriel Rivera, Texas Tech (CFHOF) (AFCA, AP-1, UPI-2 [MG], FN-2, GNS-1, NEA-2 [NT])
- Mike Charles, Syracuse (AP-3, FWAA, UPI-2, NEA-2 [DE])
- Bill Maas, Pittsburgh (FN-3, TSN)
- Jimmy Payne, Georgia (WC)
- Gary Lewis, Oklahoma State (AP-1, FN-2, GNS-1)
- Jim Jeffcoat, Arizona State (FN-3, GNS-1)
- Mark Bortz, Iowa (UPI-2)
- Andrew Provence, South Carolina (AP-3, GNS-2)
- William Perry, Clemson (AP-3)
- Greg Townsend, TCU (GNS-3)
- John Walker, Nebraska (Omaha) (GNS-3)

=== Middle guards ===
- George Achica, USC (AP-1, UPI-1, FN-1, GNS-3, NEA-1, TSN, WC)
- Tim Krumrie, Wisconsin (CFHOF) (FN-3, WC)
- Karl Morgan, UCLA (AP-2)
- Michael Carter, SMU (FN-2)

=== Linebackers ===
- Darryl Talley, West Virginia (CFHOF) (AFCA, AP-1, FWAA, UPI-1, FN-1, GNS-1, NEA-1, TSN)
- Marcus Marek, Ohio State (AFCA, AP-2, UPI-1, FN-3, NEA-2, WC)
- Ricky Hunley, Arizona (CFHOF) (AFCA, AP-1, UPI-1, FN-2, GNS-2)
- Wilber Marshall, Florida (CFHOF) (AP-1, FWAA, UPI-2, FN-3, GNS-1, NEA-2)
- Mark Stewart, Washington (AP-1, FN-1, NEA-2, TSN, WC)
- Tony Caldwell, Washington (NEA-1)
- Albert Richardson, LSU (AP-2, UPI-2, FN-1)
- Scott Radecic, Penn State (UPI-2, GNS-1, NEA-2)
- Riki Gray, USC (FN-2)
- Garin Veris, Stanford (GNS-2)
- Ray Cone, Colorado (GNS-2)
- Darrell Patterson, TCU (GNS-2)
- Johnny Jackson, New Mexico (AP-3)
- Andy Ponselgo, Navy (AP-3)
- Mark Zavagnin, Notre Dame (AP-3, FN-2)
- Johnny Rembert, Clemson (FN-3)

=== Defensive backs ===
- Terry Kinard, Clemson (CFHOF) (AFCA, AP-1, FWAA, UPI-1, FN-1, GNS-1, NEA-1, TSN, WC)
- Terry Hoage, Georgia (CFHOF) (AFCA, AP-1, UPI-1, FN-3, GNS-1, NEA-1, TSN, WC)
- Mike Richardson, Arizona State (AFCA, AP-1, UPI-1, FN-1, NEA-2, TSN, WC)
- Mark Robinson, Penn State (AP-3, FWAA, UPI-2, FN-2, GNS-2, NEA-1, TSN)
- Tommy Wilcox, Alabama (WC)
- James Britt, LSU (NEA-1)
- Jeremiah Castille, Alabama (AFCA, AP-2, UPI-2, FN-2, GNS-1, NEA-2)
- Dave Duerson, Notre Dame (FWAA, FN-1)
- Leonard Smith, McNeese State (CFHOF) (GNS-1)
- Keith Bostic, Michigan (AP-2, UPI-2, FN-2)
- Russell Carter, SMU (AP-2, FN-3)
- Gill Byrd, San Jose State (GNS-2)
- Vince Newsome, Washington (GNS-2)
- Joey Browner, USC (AP-3, GNS-2)
- Tim Lewis, Pittsburgh (NEA-2)
- David Greenwood, Wisconsin (NEA-2)
- Mike Williams, Army (AP-3)
- Greg Best, Kansas State (FN-3)

== Special teams ==
=== Kickers ===
- Chuck Nelson, Washington (AFCA, AP-1, FWAA, UPI-1, FN-1, GNS-1, NEA-1, TSN, WC)
- Fuad Reveiz, Tennessee (AP-2, GNS-2)
- Paul Woodside, West Virginia (AP-3, UPI-2)
- Mike Bass, Illinois (FN-2, GNS-3)
- Luis Zendejas, Arizona State (NEA-2)
- Mike Johnson, Notre Dame (FN-3)
- Kevin Butler, Georgia (CFHOF) (GNS-3)

=== Punters ===
- Jim Arnold, Vanderbilt (AFCA, AP-1, FWAA, UPI-1, FN-1, GNS-2, NEA-1, TSN)
- Reggie Roby, Iowa (AP-3, UPI-2, GNS-3, NEA-2, WC)
- Jimmy Colquitt, Tennessee (FN-3, GNS-1)
- Bucky Scribner, Kansas (AP-2, FN-2)

=== Returners ===
- Willie Gault, Tennessee (FWAA)

== Key ==
- **Bold** – Consensus All-American
- -1 – First-team selection
- -2 – Second-team selection
- -3 – Third-team selection
- CFHOF = College Football Hall of Fame inductee

=== Official selectors ===
- AFCA – American Football Coaches Association
- AP – Associated Press
- FWAA – Football Writers Association of America
- UPI – United Press International

=== Other selectors ===
- FN – Football News
- GNS – Gannett News Service
- NEA – Newspaper Enterprise Association "picked from a consensus poll of coaches, writers and pro scouts by syndicated columnist Murray Olderman"
- TSN – The Sporting News
- WC – Walter Camp Football Foundation

== See also ==
- 1982 All-Atlantic Coast Conference football team
- 1982 All-Big Eight Conference football team
- 1982 All-Big Ten Conference football team
- 1982 All-Pacific-10 Conference football team
- 1982 All-SEC football team
