= Chet Parlavecchio =

American football player and coach (born 1960)

No. 57
- Position: Linebacker

Personal information
- Born: February 14, 1960 (age 66); Newark, New Jersey, U.S.
- Listed height: 6 ft 2 in (1.88 m)
- Listed weight: 225 lb (102 kg)

Career information
- High school: Seton Hall
- College: Penn State
- NFL draft: 1982: 6th round, 152nd overall pick

Career history

Playing
- Green Bay Packers (1982–1983); St. Louis Cardinals (1983); New York Jets (1985)*
- * Offseason or practice squad member only

Coaching
- Tennessee Titans (2011–2012) Assistant special teams coach; Tennessee Titans (2013) Linebackers coach

Awards and highlights
- First-team All-East (1981)

Career NFL statistics
- Games played: 12
- Stats at Pro Football Reference

Chester Louis Parlavecchio (born February 14, 1960) is an American football coach and former linebacker in the National Football League (NFL) who later became an assistant special teams coach and linebackers coach with the Tennessee Titans. He also served as a defensive assistant at Temple University and as a head coach for various high schools in his native New Jersey.

He was drafted by the Green Bay Packers in the sixth round of the 1982 NFL draft and later split the 1983 NFL season between the Packers and the St. Louis Cardinals. He played college football at Penn State University. He graduated from Seton Hall Preparatory School in West Orange, New Jersey.

== Coaching career ==
Parlavecchio was named assistant special teams coach for the Tennessee Titans on February 22, 2011, where he served under head coach Mike Munchak.

Prior to his taking this position, Parlavecchio spent nearly three decades as a physical education teacher and high school football coach in his native New Jersey. He was hired by Bloomfield High School in 1987 to rejuvenate their football program then went on to coach at Irvington High School, Passaic Valley Regional High School, Clifton High School and Elizabeth High School before leaving coaching following the 2009 season. He led each of those schools to at least one playoff appearance and won the North II, Group IV state championship with Elizabeth in 2006.

Parlavecchio also coached in the college ranks for a season, serving as a linebacker coach for the Temple Owls football in 1993.

After becoming the Titans’ linebackers coach in his second season, Parlavecchio was dismissed along with the rest of Munchak’s staff when the latter was fired. He would return to New Jersey and in 2015, he would return to Passaic Valley high school as its football coach. He would lead the school to one more playoff appearance in 2017, and would resign his position following the 2019 season.

== Personal life ==
Parlavecchio is married and has two adult children. His son, Chet Jr., has followed his father into coaching and is the head football coach at New Providence High School in New Providence, New Jersey.
