= Jim Covert =

American football player (born 1960)

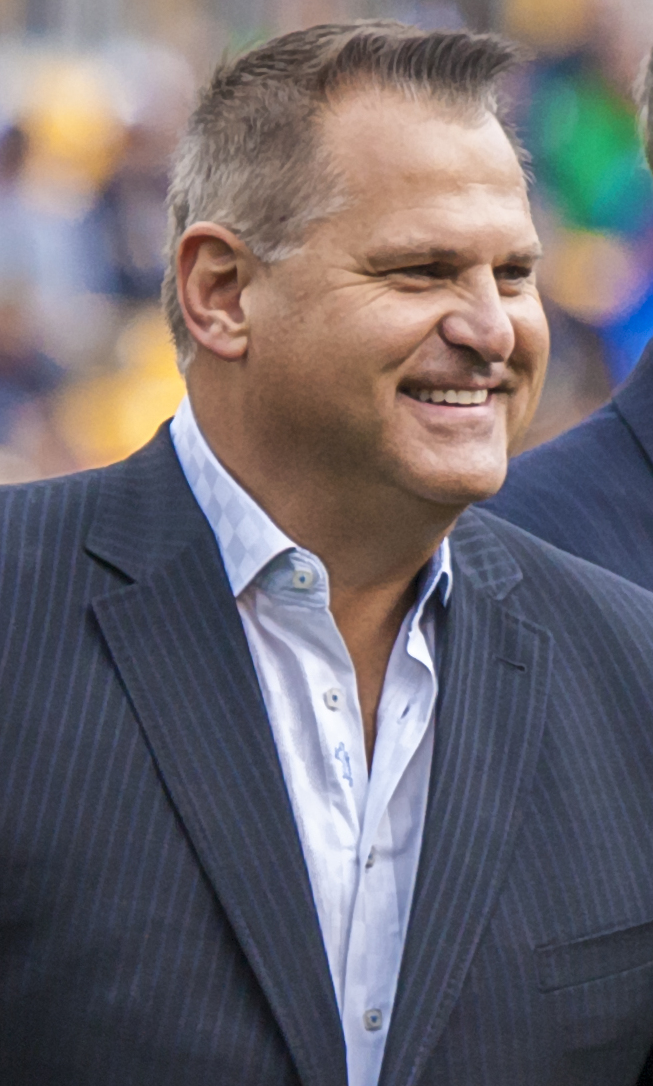
- Covert in 2015

No. 74
- Position: Offensive tackle

Personal information
- Born: March 22, 1960 (age 66); Conway, Pennsylvania, U.S.
- Listed height: 6 ft 4 in (1.93 m)
- Listed weight: 277 lb (126 kg)

Career information
- High school: Freedom (Freedom, Pennsylvania)
- College: Pittsburgh (1978–1982)
- NFL draft: 1983: 1st round, 6th overall pick

Career history
- Chicago Bears (1983–1990)

Awards and highlights
- Super Bowl champion (XX); 2× First-team All-Pro (1985, 1986); 2× Pro Bowl (1985, 1986); PFWA All-Rookie Team (1983); NFL 1980s All-Decade Team; 100 greatest Bears of All-Time; Consensus All-American (1982); 2× First-team All-East (1981, 1982); Walter Camp Alumni of the Year (1995); Pittsburgh Panthers No. 75 retired

Career NFL statistics
- Games played: 111
- Games started: 110
- Fumble recoveries: 6
- Stats at Pro Football Reference
- Pro Football Hall of Fame
- College Football Hall of Fame

James Paul "Jimbo" Covert (born March 22, 1960) is an American former professional football player who was an offensive tackle in the National Football League (NFL) for eight seasons with the Chicago Bears. He played college football for the Pittsburgh Panthers, earning consensus All-American honors. He was selected in the first round of the 1983 NFL draft.

== Early life ==
Covert was born in Conway, Pennsylvania. He excelled in both football and wrestling at Freedom Area High School in Beaver County, west of Pittsburgh. In football, Covert led the 1977 Freedom Bulldogs, with an undefeated 11–0 record, to the Midwestern Athletic Conference (MAC) Championship as a senior. Although the Bulldogs eventually lost to Laurel High School in the second round of the Western Pennsylvania Interscholastic Athletic League (WPIAL) playoffs, Covert earned UPI First-team All-State honors and became a highly recruited player.

== College career ==
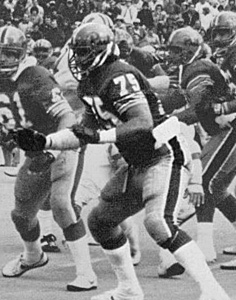
Covert, who wore #75 at Pitt, during the 1980 college season

Covert arrived as a freshman at Pitt in 1978. He began his collegiate career on the defensive line and played in every game as a freshman, especially in goal-line or short-yardage situations. A shoulder injury sidelined him for the 1979 season and he was redshirted. At the urging of offensive line coach Joe Moore, he switched to offensive tackle in the spring of 1980. It was a decision that would lead Covert to both the College Football and Pro Football Hall of Fame.

Covert was a starter on Pitt's offensive front his final three seasons, surrendering just three sacks during that span. As a consensus All-American his senior year, he did not give up a single sack. "Jimbo is so good, it's like watching a clinic film," Moore said. "After a play, I'm never surprised to turn and see Jimbo and his man 10 or 15 yards downfield."

Pitt went 31–5 during Covert's three years as a starter, finishing in the nation's Top 10 each season. The 1980 and 1981 teams each went 11–1 and finished as high as No. 2 in the national polls. In 1980, Covert played for an elite Pitt team that included future NFL stars Russ Grimm and Mark May as teammates on the offensive line, along with future Hall of Fame quarterback Dan Marino. "There were games when my uniform never got dirty," recalled Marino. "There were games when I never hit the ground. That's incredible."

His junior year, Covert was named a first-team All-American by Football News and the Newspaper Enterprise Association (NEA). As a senior, he earned consensus status by being named an All-American by no fewer than six different national selectors. Following his final Pitt season, he played in the Hula Bowl and Senior Bowl all-star games.

Covert would ultimately be named to the University of Pittsburgh's All-Time Football Team and he was enshrined in the College Football Hall of Fame in 2003. His #75 jersey was retired by Pitt in 2015.

== Professional career ==
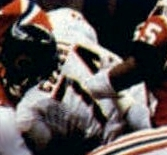
Covert playing for the Bears in Super Bowl XX

Covert was chosen in the first round of the 1983 NFL draft with the sixth overall pick by the Chicago Bears and head coach Mike Ditka, himself a former Pitt All-American from Western Pennsylvania. "Jimbo's the guy we wanted. From Day 1, we put him at left tackle and moved on," Ditka said. "You don't get too many people who come along who can make that impact. He had the respect of all his teammates and all his coaches." He became the starter at the left tackle position and was named to the UPI's 1983 NFL All-Rookie team.

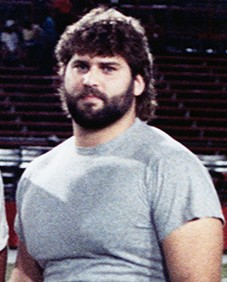
Covert with the Chicago Bears in the 1980s

Although the Bears were 22nd in total offense in 1982, the team steadily improved with Covert as a starter over the next few season peaking at second in the league in 1985. In addition, the team went from 18th in rushing in 1982 to lead the league for four consecutive seasons from 1983 to 1986. The Bears also finished second in rushing twice, 1989 and 1990, and third once, 1988, during Covert's career.

In Covert's second year in the league, he was elected by his teammates to be one of the Bears' captains. That year, he was named All-Pro by Sports Illustrated and was ranked by many as one of the best tackles in professional football. In Covert's third year, he was named consensus All-Pro, made first-team All-NFL, was selected to the Pro Bowl, and was named 1985 National Football League Players Association (NFLPA) NFC Offensive Lineman of the Year. The 1985 Chicago Bears also won Super Bowl XX.

During Covert's career, he was named to an All-Pro team three straight years (1985–1987), a first- or second-team All-NFC selection four times (1985–1987, 1990), and a first- or second-team All-NFL selection three times. Covert was a consensus All-NFL and All-Pro pick in 1985 and 1986. He was selected to two Pro Bowls, in 1985 and 1986. In 1985 he was selected as the NFC's offensive lineman of the year and in 1986 he was selected as the Miller Lite NFL Offensive Lineman of the Year.

Covert was better than all of those guys in the NFC at the time — way better. It's not close. He was one of the best in my 30 years in football. Other guys had to have help against Taylor.

— Bill Parcells

The Bears and New York Giants were perennial Super Bowl contenders in the NFC during the 1980s. Three times Covert squared off against the Giants and their Hall of Fame pass rusher Lawrence Taylor, and all three times Covert held Taylor without a sack.

In 1990, the Pro Football Hall of Fame Board of Selectors selected Covert to the NFL All-Decade Team. With Covert on the team, the Bears won six NFL Central Division titles and played in three NFC Championship games, along with the Super Bowl win.

Covert's last season was 1990. In 1991, he was placed on injured reserve for the entire season following back surgery, and he retired from the NFL in March 1992.

== Other media ==
In 1986, Covert appeared in a 20-man battle royal at WrestleMania 2 along with other NFL stars.

== Life after football ==
Covert's career after retiring from the NFL has been focused on healthcare sales, marketing, and acquisition initiatives.

His healthcare career began at Baxter International in their Physical Therapy Division, where he served as Director of Sales and Development. In November 1992, Baxter spun out the alternate site business called Caremark into an independent publicly traded company, and Covert served as Vice President of Development for Caremark Physical Therapy from 1992 to 1995. Covert expanded Caremark's Physical Therapy presence from 50 to 127 sites in 14 states increasing revenue to more than $120 million.

Caremark Physical Therapy was acquired by HealthSouth Corporation in 1995. Covert was Senior Vice President of Development for Horizon/CMS Healthcare Corporation from 1995 to 1998. In that position, he was responsible for the merger and acquisition effort as well as all sales and marketing-related initiatives. Covert led the growth effort for the Physical Therapy Division as they rapidly grew from 20 to more than 200 sites in a 16-month time frame. Horizon/CMS was ultimately sold to HealthSouth in February 1997.

In 2000, Covert started Keystone Strategies, LLC, a healthcare consulting group focused on assisting emerging healthcare companies with their sales and marketing strategies. In June 2004, Covert joined the turnaround team at HealthSouth Corporation at its corporate headquarters in Birmingham, Alabama. As Senior Vice President of Sales, Marketing, and Development, Covert had responsibility for all sales, marketing, public relations, sports sponsorship, sports medicine, and acquisition initiatives for the outpatient therapy division. HealthSouth's Outpatient Division was acquired by Select Medical Corporation in April 2007.

In May 2007, Covert was named president and chief executive officer of The Institute for Transfusion Medicine, one of the nation's foremost non-profit organizations specializing in transfusion medicine and related services, and the leader in transfusion medicine in both the Pittsburgh and Chicago regions. Its two blood centers, Central Blood Bank in Pittsburgh and LifeSource in Chicago, provide nearly a million units of lifesaving blood products annually. ITxM Diagnostics is a leading source of therapeutic and coagulation reference testing services while ITxM Clinical Services focuses on the pre-transfusion testing and delivery of vital blood products to patients. In 2018, Central Blood Bank and LifeSource were both renamed to Vitalant.

Covert was inducted into the Beaver County Sports Hall of Fame in 1996, the College Football Hall of Fame in 2003, the National Italian American Sports Hall of Fame in 2004, the Western Pennsylvania Interscholastic Athletic League Hall of Fame in 2009, the Pennsylvania Sports Hall of Fame in 2012. He had been nominated for the Pro Football Hall of Fame on numerous occasions. On January 15, 2020, Covert was elected to the Pro Football Hall of Fame Centennial Class of 2020.

== Personal life ==
Covert's wife Penny is a former cheerleader for the University of Pittsburgh. The couple have three children.
