= 1983 Pittsburgh Steelers season =

NFL team season

- Owner: Art Rooney
- General manager: Dick Haley
- Head coach: Chuck Noll
- Offensive coordinator: Tom Moore
- Defensive coordinator: Woody Widenhofer
- Home stadium: Three Rivers Stadium

Results
- Record: 10–6
- Division place: 1st AFC Central
- Playoffs: Lost Divisional Playoffs (at Raiders) 10–38
- All-Pros: Jack Lambert (1st team); Mike Webster (1st team); Gary Anderson (2nd team)
- Pro Bowlers: PK Gary Anderson; LB Jack Lambert; C Mike Webster
- Team MVP: Gary Anderson

The 1983 Pittsburgh Steelers season was the franchise's 51st season in the National Football League. The team won the AFC Central Division with a 10–6 record (the team's best record in the 1980s). In the AFC Divisional Playoffs, the Steelers were soundly beaten by the Los Angeles Raiders 38–10.

== Offseason ==
=== NFL draft ===
1983 Pittsburgh Steelers draft
Round	Pick	Player	Position	College	Notes
1	21	Gabriel Rivera	Nose tackle	Texas Tech	
2	52	Wayne Capers	Wide receiver	Kansas	
3	79	Todd Seabaugh	Linebacker	San Diego State	
4	106	Bo Metcalf	Cornerback	Baylor	
5	133	Paul Skansi	Wide receiver	Washington	
5	140	Gregg Garrity	Wide receiver	Penn State	
6	164	Eric Williams	Safety	NC State	
7	191	Mark Kirchner	Guard	Baylor	
8	199	Henry Odom	Running back	South Carolina State	
8	218	Craig Dunaway	Tight end	Michigan	
9	244	Blake Wingle	Guard	UCLA	
10	275	Roosevelt Straughter	Defensive back	Northeast Louisiana	
11	302	Mark Raugh	Tight end	West Virginia	
12	330	Roger Wiley	Running back	Sam Houston	
Made roster

=== Undrafted free agents ===
1983 Undrafted free agents of note
Player	Position	College
Greg Best	Safety	Kansas State
Pat Bowen	Safety	Florida State
Harvey Clayton	Cornerback	Florida State
Conrad Coye	Defensive end	Northeastern
Darryl Crane	Wide receiver	Bethune–Cookman
Gary Degruttola	Safety	Westminster
Dennis Fowlkes	Linebacker	West Virginia
Rickey Goff	Linebacker	Tulane
Russ Graham	Tackle	Oklahoma State
Ananias Harris	Quarterback	Alabama A&M
Tim Harris	Running back	Washington State
Jay Hull	Guard	Wichita State
Russ Joyner	Linebacker	Boston College
Lonnie Kennell	Nose tackle	Wichita State
Pete Rostosky	Tackle	UConn
Chet Winters	Running back	Oklahoma

== Personnel ==
=== Staff ===
1983 Pittsburgh Steelers staff
Front office: Chairman of the board – Arthur J. Rooney; President – Daniel M. Rooney; Vice president – John R. McGinley; Vice president – Arthur J. Rooney, Jr.; Controller – Dennis P. Thimons; Assistant controller – Dan Ferens; Traveling secretary – James A. Boston; Public relations director – Ed Kiely; Publicity director – Joe Gordon; Assistant publicity director – John Evenson; Director of ticket sales – Geraldine Glenn; Director of player personnel – Dick Haley; Assistant director of player personnel – William Nunn, Jr.; Pro talent scout – Tom Modrak; Talent scout – West Coast – Bob Schmitz; College talent scout – Joe Krupa; Head coaches: Head coach – Chuck Noll; Assistant head coach – Woody Widenhofer; Offensive coaches: Offensive coordinator – Tom Moore; Offensive line – Ron Blackledge; Offensive backfield – Dick Hoak	Defensive coaches: Defensive coordinator – Woody Widenhofer; Defensive backfield – Tony Dungy; Defensive line – Jon Kolb; Strength and conditioning: Conditioning coach – Jon Kolb; Physician, M.D. – Dr. David S. Huber; Physician, M.D. – Dr. Anthony P. Yates; Physician, orthopedic – Dr. Paul Steele; Neurological surgery consultant – Dr. Joseph C. Maroon; Dentist – Dr. George P. Boucek; Ophthalmologist – Dr. Phillip Buzzelli; Trainer – Ralph Berlin; Assistant trainer – Gary Stragar; Equipment manager – Anthony Parisi; Field manager – Rodgers Freyvogel; Film director – Bob McCartney; Photographers – Harry Homa, Bill Amatucci

=== Roster ===
1983 Pittsburgh Steelers roster
Quarterbacks (QB): 12 Terry Bradshaw; 16 Mark Malone; 18 Cliff Stoudt; Running backs (RB): 34 Walter Abercrombie; 45 Russell Davis; 32 Franco Harris; 43 Tim Harris; 44 Henry Odom; 30 Frank Pollard; Wide receivers (WR): 80 Wayne Capers; 86 Gregg Garrity; 27 Greg Hawthorne; 86 Paul Skansi; 85 Calvin Sweeney; Tight ends (TE): 89 Bennie Cunningham; 88 Craig Dunaway; 87 John Rodgers	Offensive linemen (OL): 71 Emil Boures G/T; 79 Larry Brown T; 77 Steve Courson G; 55 Rick Donnalley G/C; 62 Tunch Ilkin T; 52 Mike Webster C; 61 Blake Wingle G; 73 Craig Wolfley G; Defensive linemen (DL): 65 Tom Beasley DE; 67 Gary Dunn NT; 92 Keith Gary DE; 95 John Goodman DE; 64 Edmund Nelson NT; 93 Keith Willis DE	Linebackers (LB): 54 Craig Bingham OLB; 56 Robin Cole OLB; 53 Bryan Hinkle OLB; 58 Jack Lambert ILB; 50 David Little ILB; 57 Mike Merriweather OLB; 51 Loren Toews ILB; Defensive backs (DB): 25 Greg Best SS; 47 Mel Blount CB; 33 Harvey Clayton CB; 29 Ron Johnson FS; 31 Donnie Shell SS; 41 Sam Washington CB; 49 Dwayne Woodruff CB; 22 Rick Woods FS; Special teams (ST): 1 Gary Anderson K; 5 Craig Colquitt P	Reserve: 20 Ernest French S (PUP); 68 Jay Hull G (IR); 90 Bob Kohrs LB (IR); 97 John Meyer T (PUP); 66 Ted Petersen T (IR); 28 Lou Rash CB (IR); 69 Gabriel Rivera NT (IR); 73 Pete Rostosky T (IR); 59 Todd Seabaugh LB (IR); 82 John Stallworth WR (IR); 21 Eric Williams CB/S (IR); Rookies in italics 48 active, 11 reserve

== Preseason ==
=== Schedule ===
Week	Date	Opponent	Game Site	Kickoff (ET)	TV	Result	Record
1	Saturday, July 30	vs. New Orleans Saints	Fawcett Stadium (Canton, Ohio)	2:00 p.m.	ABC	W 27–14	1–0
2	Saturday, August 6	vs. New England Patriots	Neyland Stadium (Knoxville, Tennessee)	7:30 p.m.	WPXI	W 27–16	2–0
3	Friday, August 12	New York Giants	Three Rivers Stadium	8:00 p.m.	ABC	L 22–13	2–1
4	Saturday, August 20	at Dallas Cowboys	Texas Stadium	9:00 p.m.	NBC	W 24–7	3–1
5	Thursday, August 25	at Philadelphia Eagles	Veterans Stadium	7:30 p.m.	WPXI	W 10–3	4–1

== Regular season ==
=== Schedule ===
Week	Date	Opponent	Game Site	Kickoff (ET)	TV	Result	Record
1	Sunday, September 4	Denver Broncos	Three Rivers Stadium	1:00 p.m.	NBC	L 14–10	0–1
2	Sunday, September 11	at Green Bay Packers	Lambeau Field	1:00 p.m.	NBC	W 25–21	1–1
3	Sunday, September 18	at Houston Oilers	Astrodome	1:00 p.m.	NBC	W 40–28	2–1
4	Sunday, September 25	New England Patriots	Three Rivers Stadium	1:00 p.m.	NBC	L 28–23	2–2
5	Sunday, October 2	Houston Oilers	Three Rivers Stadium	1:00 p.m.	NBC	W 17–10	3–2
6	Monday, October 10	at Cincinnati Bengals	Riverfront Stadium	9:00 p.m.	ABC	W 24–14	4–2
7	Sunday, October 16	Cleveland Browns	Three Rivers Stadium	1:00 p.m.	NBC	W 44–17	5–2
8	Sunday, October 23	at Seattle Seahawks	Kingdome	4:00 p.m.	NBC	W 27–21	6–2
9	Sunday, October 30	Tampa Bay Buccaneers	Three Rivers Stadium	1:00 p.m.	CBS	W 17–12	7–2
10	Sunday, November 6	San Diego Chargers	Three Rivers Stadium	1:00 p.m.	NBC	W 26–3	8–2
11	Sunday, November 13	at Baltimore Colts	Memorial Stadium	2:00 p.m.	NBC	W 24–13	9–2
12	Sunday, November 20	Minnesota Vikings	Three Rivers Stadium	1:00 p.m.	CBS	L 17–14	9–3
13	Thursday, November 24	at Detroit Lions	Pontiac Silverdome	12:30 p.m.	NBC	L 45–3	9–4
14	Sunday, December 4	Cincinnati Bengals	Three Rivers Stadium	1:00 p.m.	NBC	L 23–10	9–5
15	Saturday, December 10	at New York Jets	Shea Stadium	12:30 p.m.	NBC	W 34–7	10–5
16	Sunday, December 18	at Cleveland Browns	Cleveland Municipal Stadium	1:00 p.m.	NBC	L 30–17	10–6

=== Week 1: vs. Denver Broncos ===
Denver Broncos at Pittsburgh Steelers

Quarter	1	2	3	4	Total
Broncos	0	7	0	7	14
Steelers	0	7	3	0	10

at Three Rivers Stadium, Pittsburgh, Pennsylvania

- Date: September 4, 1983
- Game time: 1:00 pm EDT
- Game weather: 80 °F or 26.7 °C (Drizzle)
- Game attendance: 58,233
- Referee: Jerry Seeman
- TV announcers (NBC): Bob Costas (play by play), Bob Trumpy (color commentator)

Scoring summary

Quarter	Time	Drive			Team	Scoring information	Score	
Quarter	Time	Plays	Yards	TOP	Team	Scoring information	Broncos	Steelers
2					Broncos	Sammy Winder 1-yard touchdown run, Rich Karlis kick good	7	0
2					Steelers	Franco Harris 4-yard touchdown run, Gary Anderson kick good	7	7
3					Steelers	31-yard field goal by Gary Anderson	7	10
4					Broncos	Ron Egloff 2-yard touchdown reception from Steve DeBerg, Rich Karlis kick good	14	10
"TOP" = time of possession. For other American football terms, see Glossary of American football.							14	10

=== Week 2: at Green Bay Packers ===
Pittsburgh Steelers at Green Bay Packers

Quarter	1	2	3	4	Total
Steelers	7	6	3	9	25
Packers	7	7	0	7	21

at Lambeau Field, Green Bay, Wisconsin

- Date: September 11, 1983
- Game time: 1:00 pm EDT
- Game weather: 60 °F (15.6 °C), wind 11 miles per hour (18 km/h; 9.6 kn)
- Game attendance: 58,144
- Referee: Fred Silva
- TV announcers (NBC): Bob Costas (play by play), Bob Trumpy (color commentator)

Scoring summary

Quarter	Time	Drive			Team	Scoring information	Score	
Quarter	Time	Plays	Yards	TOP	Team	Scoring information	Steelers	Packers
1					Steelers	Franco Harris 3-yard touchdown run, Gary Anderson kick good	7	0
1					Packers	James Lofton 71-yard touchdown reception from Lynn Dickey, Jan Stenerud kick good	7	7
2					Steelers	Cliff Stoudt 1-yard touchdown run, Gary Anderson kick no good (blocked)	13	7
2					Packers	James Lofton 73-yard touchdown reception from Lynn Dickey, Jan Stenerud kick good	13	14
3					Steelers	30-yard field goal by Gary Anderson	16	14
4					Steelers	Frank Pollard 1-yard touchdown run, Gary Anderson kick good	23	14
4					Packers	James Lofton 13-yard touchdown reception from Lynn Dickey, Jan Stenerud kick good	23	21
4					Steelers	Lynn Dickey tackled in end zone for a safety by Bob Kohrs	25	21
"TOP" = time of possession. For other American football terms, see Glossary of American football.							25	21

=== Week 3: at Houston Oilers ===
Pittsburgh Steelers at Houston Oilers

Quarter	1	2	3	4	Total
Steelers	6	6	14	14	40
Oilers	7	0	0	21	28

at Astrodome, Houston, Texas

- Date: September 18, 1983
- Game time: 1:00 pm EDT
- Game weather: Dome
- Game attendance: 44,150
- Referee: Jim Tunney
- TV announcers (NBC): Marv Albert (play by play), John Brodie (color commentator)

Scoring summary

Quarter	Time	Drive			Team	Scoring information	Score	
Quarter	Time	Plays	Yards	TOP	Team	Scoring information	Steelers	Oilers
1					Steelers	49-yard field goal by Gary Anderson	3	0
1					Oilers	Carl Roaches 97-yard kickoff return touchdown	3	7
1					Steelers	35-yard field goal by Gary Anderson	6	7
2					Steelers	20-yard field goal by Gary Anderson	9	7
2					Steelers	22-yard field goal by Gary Anderson	12	7
3					Steelers	Franco Harris 6-yard touchdown run, Gary Anderson kick good	19	7
3					Steelers	Walter Abercrombie 30-yard touchdown reception from Cliff Stoudt, Gary Anderson kick good	26	7
4					Steelers	Interception returned 14 yards for touchdown by Bryan Hinkle, Gary Anderson kick good	33	7
4					Oilers	Larry Moriarty 1-yard touchdown run, Florian Kempf kick good	33	14
4					Oilers	Earl Campbell 1-yard touchdown run, Florian Kempf kick good	33	21
4					Steelers	Walter Abercrombie 50-yard touchdown run, Gary Anderson kick good	40	21
4					Oilers	Herkie Walls 28-yard touchdown reception from Archie Manning, Florian Kempf kick good	40	28
"TOP" = time of possession. For other American football terms, see Glossary of American football.							40	28

=== Week 4: vs. New England Patriots ===
New England Patriots at Pittsburgh Steelers

Quarter	1	2	3	4	Total
Patriots	7	7	7	7	28
Steelers	7	6	0	10	23

at Three Rivers Stadium, Pittsburgh, Pennsylvania

- Date: September 25, 1983
- Game time: 1:00 pm EDT
- Game weather: 71 °F or 21.7 °C (Mostly Cloudy)
- Game attendance: 55,282
- Referee: Jerry Markbreit
- TV announcers (NBC): Dick Enberg (play by play), Merlin Olsen (color commentator)

Scoring summary

Quarter	Time	Drive			Team	Scoring information	Score	
Quarter	Time	Plays	Yards	TOP	Team	Scoring information	Patriots	Steelers
1					Steelers	Calvin Sweeney 3-yard touchdown reception from Cliff Stoudt, Gary Anderson kick good	0	7
1					Patriots	Clayton Weishuhn 27-yard run for touchdown off lateral pass from interception by Steve Nelson	7	7
2					Steelers	20-yard field goal by Gary Anderson	7	10
2					Patriots	Derrick Ramsey 4-yard touchdown reception from Steve Grogan, John Smith kick good	14	10
2					Steelers	34-yard field goal by Gary Anderson	14	13
3					Patriots	Tony Collins 4-yard touchdown run, John Smith kick good	21	13
4					Steelers	28-yard field goal by Gary Anderson	21	16
4					Steelers	Walter Abercrombie 26-yard touchdown reception from Cliff Stoudt, Gary Anderson kick good	21	23
4					Patriots	Stephen Starring 76-yard touchdown reception from Steve Grogan, John Smith kick good	28	23
"TOP" = time of possession. For other American football terms, see Glossary of American football.							28	23

=== Week 5: vs. Houston Oilers ===
Houston Oilers at Pittsburgh Steelers

Quarter	1	2	3	4	Total
Oilers	0	3	7	0	10
Steelers	0	7	0	10	17

at Three Rivers Stadium, Pittsburgh, Pennsylvania

- Date: October 2, 1983
- Game time: 1:00 pm EDT
- Game weather: 73 °F or 22.8 °C (Cloudy)
- Game attendance: 56,901
- Referee: Dick Jorgensen
- TV announcers (NBC): Don Criqui (play by play), Ahmad Rashad (color commentator)

Scoring summary

Quarter	Time	Drive			Team	Scoring information	Score	
Quarter	Time	Plays	Yards	TOP	Team	Scoring information	Oilers	Steelers
2					Steelers	Frank Pollard 1-yard touchdown run, Gary Anderson kick good	0	7
2					Oilers	34-yard field goal by Florian Kempf	3	7
3					Oilers	Earl Campbell 1-yard touchdown run, Florian Kempf kick good	10	7
4					Steelers	Walter Abercrombie 51-yard touchdown reception from Cliff Stoudt, Gary Anderson kick good	10	14
4					Steelers	18-yard field goal by Gary Anderson	10	17
"TOP" = time of possession. For other American football terms, see Glossary of American football.							10	17

=== Week 6: at Cincinnati Bengals ===
Pittsburgh Steelers at Cincinnati Bengals

Quarter	1	2	3	4	Total
Steelers	7	3	0	14	24
Bengals	0	14	0	0	14

at Riverfront Stadium, Cincinnati

- Date: October 10, 1983
- Game time: 9:00 pm EDT
- Game weather: 56 °F (13.3 °C), wind 10 miles per hour (16 km/h; 8.7 kn)
- Game attendance: 56,086
- Referee: Pat Haggerty
- TV announcers (ABC): Frank Gifford (play by play), Don Meredith & O. J. Simpson (color commentators)

Scoring summary

Quarter	Time	Drive			Team	Scoring information	Score	
Quarter	Time	Plays	Yards	TOP	Team	Scoring information		
1					Steelers	Fumble recovery returned 38 yards for touchdown by Rick Woods, Gary Anderson kick good	7	0
2					Steelers	35-yard field goal by Gary Anderson	10	0
2					Bengals	Pete Johnson 1-yard touchdown run, Jim Breech kick good	10	7
2					Bengals	Interception returned 41 yards for touchdown by James Griffin, Jim Breech kick good	10	14
4					Steelers	Interception returned 34 yards for touchdown by Johnson, Gary Anderson kick good	17	14
4					Steelers	Interception returned 70 yards for touchdown by Harvey Clayton, Gary Anderson kick good/no good (blocked)/no good (miss right)/no good (miss left)/no good (miss short)/no good	24	14
"TOP" = time of possession. For other American football terms, see Glossary of American football.							24	14

=== Week 7: vs. Cleveland Browns ===
Cleveland Browns at Pittsburgh Steelers

Quarter	1	2	3	4	Total
Browns	3	7	7	0	17
Steelers	20	14	0	10	44

at Three Rivers Stadium, Pittsburgh, Pennsylvania

- Date: October 16, 1983
- Game time: 1:00 pm EDT
- Game weather: 73 °F or 22.8 °C (Mostly Cloudy)
- Game attendance: 59,263
- Referee: Bob McElwee
- TV announcers (NBC): Charlie Jones (play by play), Bob Griese (color commentator)

Scoring summary

Quarter	Time	Drive			Team	Scoring information	Score	
Quarter	Time	Plays	Yards	TOP	Team	Scoring information	Browns	Steelers
1					Steelers	18-yard field goal by Gary Anderson	0	3
1					Steelers	Walter Abercrombie 1-yard touchdown run, Gary Anderson kick good	0	10
1					Steelers	Interception returned 31 yards for touchdown by Mike Merriweather, Gary Anderson kick good	0	17
1					Browns	27-yard field goal by Matt Bahr	3	17
1					Steelers	29-yard field goal by Gary Anderson	3	20
2					Browns	Boyce Green 23-yard touchdown run, Matt Bahr kick good	10	20
2					Steelers	Franco Harris 1-yard touchdown run, Gary Anderson kick good	10	27
2					Steelers	Calvin Sweeney 40-yard touchdown reception from Cliff Stoudt, Gary Anderson kick good	10	34
3					Browns	Boyce Green 1-yard touchdown run, Matt Bahr kick good	17	34
4					Steelers	26-yard field goal by Gary Anderson	17	37
4					Steelers	Fumble recovery returned 94 yards for touchdown by Greg Best, Gary Anderson kick good	17	44
"TOP" = time of possession. For other American football terms, see Glossary of American football.							17	44

=== Week 8: at Seattle Seahawks ===
Pittsburgh Steelers at Seattle Seahawks

Quarter	1	2	3	4	Total
Steelers	7	17	0	3	27
Seahawks	0	0	7	14	21

at Kingdome, Seattle

- Date: October 23, 1983
- Game time: 4:00 pm EDT
- Game weather: Dome
- Game attendance: 61,615
- Referee: Gordon McCarter
- TV announcers (NBC): Dick Enberg (play by play), Merlin Olsen (color commentator)

Scoring summary

Quarter	Time	Drive			Team	Scoring information	Score	
Quarter	Time	Plays	Yards	TOP	Team	Scoring information	Steelers	Seahawks
1					Steelers	Franco Harris 9-yard touchdown run, Gary Anderson kick good	7	0
2					Steelers	Cliff Stoudt 1-yard touchdown run, Gary Anderson kick good	14	0
2					Steelers	Frank Pollard 1-yard touchdown run, Gary Anderson kick good	21	0
2					Steelers	20-yard field goal by Gary Anderson	24	0
3					Seahawks	Curt Warner 1-yard touchdown run, Norm Johnson kick good	24	7
4					Seahawks	Steve Largent 21-yard touchdown reception from Dave Krieg, Norm Johnson kick good	24	14
4					Steelers	32-yard field goal by Gary Anderson	27	14
4					Seahawks	Paul Johns 26-yard touchdown reception from Dave Krieg, Norm Johnson kick good	27	21
"TOP" = time of possession. For other American football terms, see Glossary of American football.							27	21

=== Week 9: vs. Tampa Bay Buccaneers ===
Tampa Bay Buccaneers at Pittsburgh Steelers

Quarter	1	2	3	4	Total
Buccaneers	6	3	3	0	12
Steelers	0	0	0	17	17

at Three Rivers Stadium, Pittsburgh, Pennsylvania

- Date: October 30, 1983
- Game time: 1:00 pm EST
- Game weather: 57 °F or 13.9 °C (Cloudy)
- Game attendance: 57,468
- Referee: Ben Dreith
- TV announcers (CBS): Jim Kelly (play by play), John Dockery (color commentator)

Scoring summary

Quarter	Time	Drive			Team	Scoring information	Score	
Quarter	Time	Plays	Yards	TOP	Team	Scoring information	Buccaneers	Steelers
1					Buccaneers	26-yard field goal by Bill Capece	3	0
1					Buccaneers	49-yard field goal by Bill Capece	6	0
2					Buccaneers	27-yard field goal by Bill Capece	9	0
3					Buccaneers	28-yard field goal by Bill Capece	12	0
4					Steelers	Wayne Capers 11-yard touchdown reception from Cliff Stoudt, Gary Anderson kick good	12	7
4					Steelers	42-yard field goal by Gary Anderson	12	10
4					Steelers	Frank Pollard 2-yard touchdown run, Gary Anderson kick good	12	17
"TOP" = time of possession. For other American football terms, see Glossary of American football.							12	17

=== Week 10: vs. San Diego Chargers ===
San Diego Chargers at Pittsburgh Steelers

Quarter	1	2	3	4	Total
Chargers	0	3	0	0	3
Steelers	17	3	3	3	26

at Three Rivers Stadium, Pittsburgh, Pennsylvania

- Date: November 6, 1983
- Game time: 1:00 pm EST
- Game weather: 57 °F or 13.9 °C (Partly Cloudy)
- Game attendance: 58,191
- Referee: Jerry Seeman
- TV announcers (NBC): Bob Costas (play by play), Bob Trumpy (color commentator)

Scoring summary

Quarter	Time	Drive			Team	Scoring information	Score	
Quarter	Time	Plays	Yards	TOP	Team	Scoring information	Chargers	Steelers
1					Steelers	Walter Abercrombie 6-yard touchdown run, Gary Anderson kick good	0	7
1					Steelers	45-yard field goal by Gary Anderson	0	10
1					Steelers	Fumble recovery returned 3 yards for touchdown by Mel Blount, Gary Anderson kick good	0	17
2					Chargers	39-yard field goal by Rolf Benirschke	3	17
2					Steelers	30-yard field goal by Gary Anderson	3	20
3					Steelers	49-yard field goal by Gary Anderson	3	23
4					Steelers	42-yard field goal by Gary Anderson	3	26
"TOP" = time of possession. For other American football terms, see Glossary of American football.							3	26

=== Week 11: at Baltimore Colts ===
Pittsburgh Steelers at Baltimore Colts

Quarter	1	2	3	4	Total
Steelers	7	10	0	7	24
Colts	3	3	7	0	13

at Memorial Stadium, Baltimore, Maryland

- Date: November 13, 1983
- Game time: 2:00 pm EST
- Game weather: 38 °F (3.3 °C), wind 9 miles per hour (14 km/h; 7.8 kn)
- Game attendance: 57,319
- Referee: Jerry Markbreit
- TV announcers (NBC): Merle Harmon (play by play), Jim Turner (color commentator)

Scoring summary

Quarter	Time	Drive			Team	Scoring information	Score	
Quarter	Time	Plays	Yards	TOP	Team	Scoring information	Steelers	Colts
1					Steelers	Walter Abercrombie 11-yard touchdown run, Gary Anderson kick good	7	0
1					Colts	46-yard field goal by Raul Allegre	7	3
2					Colts	37-yard field goal by Raul Allegre	7	6
2					Steelers	42-yard field goal by Gary Anderson	10	6
2					Steelers	Calvin Sweeney 7-yard touchdown reception from Cliff Stoudt, Gary Anderson kick good	17	6
3					Colts	Curtis Dickey 5-yard touchdown run, Raul Allegre kick good	17	13
4					Steelers	Bennie Cunningham 2-yard touchdown reception from Cliff Stoudt, Gary Anderson kick good	24	13
"TOP" = time of possession. For other American football terms, see Glossary of American football.							24	13

The Colts' first sellout since 1977, and last in Baltimore, came about because thousands of Steelers fans who normally could not purchase tickets at Three Rivers Stadium found them cheap and plentiful in Maryland. Pittsburgh returned to Memorial Stadium with the birth of the Baltimore Ravens in 1996.

=== Week 12: vs. Minnesota Vikings ===
Minnesota Vikings at Pittsburgh Steelers

Quarter	1	2	3	4	Total
Vikings	7	0	10	0	17
Steelers	7	0	0	7	14

at Three Rivers Stadium, Pittsburgh, Pennsylvania

- Date: November 20, 1983
- Game time: 1:00 pm EST
- Game weather: 63 °F or 17.2 °C (Light Rain)
- Game attendance: 58,417
- Referee: Jim Tunney
- TV announcers (CBS): Jim Kelly (play by play), John Dockery (color commentator)

Scoring summary

Quarter	Time	Drive			Team	Scoring information	Score	
Quarter	Time	Plays	Yards	TOP	Team	Scoring information	Vikings	Steelers
1					Steelers	Bennie Cunningham 3-yard touchdown reception from Cliff Stoudt, Gary Anderson kick good	0	7
1					Vikings	Sam McCullum 30-yard touchdown reception from Steve Dils, Benny Ricardo kick good	7	7
3					Vikings	Tony Galbreath 6-yard touchdown reception from Steve Dils, Benny Ricardo kick good	14	7
3					Vikings	39-yard field goal by Benny Ricardo	17	7
4					Steelers	Cliff Stoudt 4-yard touchdown run, Gary Anderson kick good	17	14
"TOP" = time of possession. For other American football terms, see Glossary of American football.							17	14

=== Week 13: at Detroit Lions ===
Pittsburgh Steelers at Detroit Lions

Quarter	1	2	3	4	Total
Steelers	0	3	0	0	3
Lions	17	7	7	14	45

at Pontiac Silverdome, Pontiac, Michigan

- Date: November 24, 1983
- Game time: 12:30 pm EST
- Game weather: Dome
- Game attendance: 77,724
- Referee: Gene Barth
- TV announcers (NBC): Dick Enberg (play by play), Merlin Olsen (color commentator)

Scoring summary

Quarter	Time	Drive			Team	Scoring information	Score	
Quarter	Time	Plays	Yards	TOP	Team	Scoring information	Steelers	Lions
1					Lions	Billy Sims 2-yard touchdown run, Eddie Murray kick good	0	7
1					Lions	27-yard field goal by Eddie Murray	0	10
1					Lions	Ulysses Norris 13-yard touchdown reception from Eric Hipple, Eddie Murray kick good	0	17
2					Steelers	38-yard field goal by Gary Anderson	3	17
2					Lions	Ulysses Norris 4-yard touchdown reception from Eric Hipple, Eddie Murray kick good	3	24
3					Lions	Billy Sims 2-yard touchdown run, Eddie Murray kick good	3	31
4					Lions	Robbie Martin 81-yard punt return touchdown	3	38
4					Lions	Jeff Chadwick 4-yard touchdown reception from Gary Danielson, Eddie Murray kick good	3	45
"TOP" = time of possession. For other American football terms, see Glossary of American football.							3	45

Pittsburgh's first trip to the Motor City since 1967 was nothing short of disastrous. It was the Steelers' most lopsided loss under Noll, eclipsed only by a 51-0 embarrassment by the Browns at home in the 1989 opener.

=== Week 14: vs. Cincinnati Bengals ===
Cincinnati Bengals at Pittsburgh Steelers

Quarter	1	2	3	4	Total
Bengals	14	3	3	3	23
Steelers	0	3	0	7	10

at Three Rivers Stadium, Pittsburgh, Pennsylvania

- Date: December 4, 1983
- Game time: 1:00 pm EST
- Game weather: 44 °F or 6.7 °C (Fog & Light Drizzle)
- Game attendance: 55,832
- Referee: Red Cashion
- TV announcers (NBC): Charlie Jones (play by play), Bob Griese (color commentator)

Scoring summary

Quarter	Time	Drive			Team	Scoring information	Score	
Quarter	Time	Plays	Yards	TOP	Team	Scoring information		
1					Bengals	Pete Johnson 1-yard touchdown run, Jim Breech kick good	7	0
1					Bengals	Pete Johnson 16-yard touchdown run, Jim Breech kick good	14	0
2					Bengals	19-yard field goal by Jim Breech	17	0
2					Steelers	48-yard field goal by Gary Anderson	17	3
3					Bengals	27-yard field goal by Jim Breech	20	3
4					Steelers	Franco Harris 29-yard touchdown reception from Cliff Stoudt, Gary Anderson kick good	20	10
4					Bengals	32-yard field goal by Jim Breech	23	10
"TOP" = time of possession. For other American football terms, see Glossary of American football.							23	10

=== Week 15: at New York Jets ===
Quarter	1	2	3	4	Total
Steelers	7	13	7	7	34
Jets	0	0	7	0	7

at Shea Stadium, Flushing, New York

- Date: December 10, 1983
- Game time: 12:30 pm EST
- Game weather: 45 °F (7.2 °C), wind 12 miles per hour (19 km/h; 10 kn)
- Game attendance: 53,996
- Referee: Bob McElwee
- TV announcers (NBC): Dick Enberg and Merlin Olsen
- Pittsburgh Steelers at New York Jets – December 10th, 1983

Scoring summary

Quarter	Time	Drive			Team	Scoring information	Score	
Quarter	Time	Plays	Yards	TOP	Team	Scoring information	Steelers	Jets
1					Steelers	Gregg Garrity 17-yard touchdown reception from Terry Bradshaw, Gary Anderson kick good	7	0
2					Steelers	Calvin Sweeney 10-yard touchdown reception from Terry Bradshaw, Gary Anderson kick good	14	0
2					Steelers	29-yard field goal by Gary Anderson	17	0
2					Steelers	40-yard field goal by Gary Anderson	20	0
3					Steelers	Bennie Cunningham 13-yard touchdown reception from Cliff Stoudt, Gary Anderson kick good	27	0
3					Jets	Johnny Lam Jones 27-yard touchdown reception from Pat Ryan, Pat Leahy kick good	27	7
4					Steelers	Calvin Sweeney 18-yard touchdown reception from Cliff Stoudt, Gary Anderson kick good	34	7
"TOP" = time of possession. For other American football terms, see Glossary of American football.							34	7

After having been sidelined with an elbow injury for the first fourteen games of the season, 36-year old Terry Bradshaw started his first game of the season. Despite still clearly being hampered by his elbow, he was able to impress in limited time. It would be the final time Bradshaw would see the field as a player, as he felt a pop in his elbow while throwing his final pass, a 10-yard touchdown to Calvin Sweeney. Bradshaw did not play during the play-offs and retired after the season.

This was also the final NFL game held at Shea Stadium.

=== Week 16: at Cleveland Browns ===
Quarter	1	2	3	4	Total
Steelers	3	7	0	7	17
Browns	9	14	7	0	30

at Cleveland Municipal Stadium, Cleveland, Ohio

- Date: December 18, 1983
- Game time: 1:00 pm EST
- Game weather: 18 °F (−7.8 °C), wind 11 miles per hour (18 km/h; 9.6 kn), wind chill 6 °F or −14.4 °C
- Game attendance: 72,313
- Referee: Ben Dreith
- TV announcers (NBC): Bob Costas (play by play), Bob Trumpy (color commentator)

Scoring summary

Quarter	Time	Drive			Team	Scoring information	Score	
Quarter	Time	Plays	Yards	TOP	Team	Scoring information	Steelers	Browns
1					Steelers	34-yard field goal by Gary Anderson	3	0
1					Browns	Rocky Belk 64-yard touchdown reception from Brian Sipe, Matt Bahr kick no good	3	6
1					Browns	30-yard field goal by Matt Bahr	3	9
2					Browns	Harry Holt 3-yard touchdown reception from Brian Sipe, Matt Bahr kick good	3	16
2					Steelers	Cliff Stoudt 3-yard touchdown run, Gary Anderson kick good	10	16
2					Browns	Ricky Feacher 4-yard touchdown reception from Brian Sipe, Matt Bahr kick good	10	23
3					Browns	Harry Holt 1-yard touchdown reception from Brian Sipe, Matt Bahr kick good	10	30
4					Steelers	Franco Harris 2-yard touchdown reception from Mark Malone, Gary Anderson kick good	17	30
"TOP" = time of possession. For other American football terms, see Glossary of American football.							17	30

Eight days after Bradshaw threw his last pass, Brian Sipe started his last NFL game in what turned out to be a hollow victory for the Browns, who were eliminated from the playoffs three hours later when the Seahawks defeated the Patriots in Seattle.

=== Standings ===
AFC Central
	W	L	T	PCT	DIV	CONF	PF	PA	STK
Pittsburgh Steelers^{(3)}	10	6	0	.625	4–2	8–4	355	303	L1
Cleveland Browns	9	7	0	.563	3–3	7–5	356	342	W1
Cincinnati Bengals	7	9	0	.438	4–2	4–8	346	302	L1
Houston Oilers	2	14	0	.125	1–5	1–11	288	460	L1

== Playoffs ==
=== AFC Divisional Playoff: at Los Angeles Raiders ===
Pittsburgh Steelers at Los Angeles Raiders

Quarter	1	2	3	4	Total
Steelers	3	0	7	0	10
Raiders	7	10	21	0	38

at Los Angeles Memorial Coliseum, Los Angeles

- Date: January 1, 1984
- Game time: 4:00 pm EST/1:00 pm PST
- Game weather: 61 °F (16.1 °C), wind 6 miles per hour (9.7 km/h; 5.2 kn)
- Game attendance: 90,380
- Referee: Gene Barth
- TV announcers (NBC): Dick Enberg (play by play), Merlin Olsen (color commentator)

Scoring summary

Quarter	Time	Drive			Team	Scoring information	Score	
Quarter	Time	Plays	Yards	TOP	Team	Scoring information	Steelers	Raiders
1					Steelers	17-yard field goal by Gary Anderson	3	0
1					Raiders	Interception returned 18 yards for touchdown by Lester Hayes, Chris Bahr kick good	3	7
2					Raiders	Marcus Allen 4-yard touchdown run, Chris Bahr kick good	3	14
2					Raiders	45-yard field goal by Chris Bahr	3	17
3					Raiders	Kenny King 9-yard touchdown run, Chris Bahr kick good	3	24
3					Raiders	Marcus Allen 49-yard touchdown run, Chris Bahr kick good	3	31
3					Steelers	John Stallworth 58-yard touchdown reception from Cliff Stoudt, Gary Anderson kick good	10	31
3					Raiders	Frank Hawkins 2-yard touchdown run, Chris Bahr kick good	10	38
"TOP" = time of possession. For other American football terms, see Glossary of American football.							10	38
