= 1983 USFL territorial draft =

First territorial draft of the USFL

General information
- Date: January 4, 1983
- Location: Grand Hyatt Hotel, New York

Overview
- League: USFL

The 1983 USFL territorial draft was the first territorial draft of the United States Football League (USFL). It took place on January 4, 1983, at the Grand Hyatt Hotel in New York.

== Player selections ==
= All-Star
= USFL MVP

USFL team	Player	Position	College
Arizona Wranglers	Mike Black	P	Arizona State
Arizona Wranglers	Ron Brown	WR	Arizona State
Arizona Wranglers	Bryan Caldwell	DE	Arizona State
Arizona Wranglers	Mike Carter	RB	New Mexico
Arizona Wranglers	Mark Diamond	K	Northern Arizona
Arizona Wranglers	Andre Francis	DB	New Mexico State
Arizona Wranglers	Willie Gittens	RB	Arizona State
Arizona Wranglers	Al Gross	DB	Arizona
Arizona Wranglers	Mark Hicks	LB	Arizona State
Arizona Wranglers	Jim Jeffcoat	DE	Arizona State
Arizona Wranglers	Mark Keel	TE	Arizona
Arizona Wranglers	Jeff Kiewel	G	Arizona
Arizona Wranglers	Mike Langston	DE	Arizona State
Arizona Wranglers	Keith MaGee	WR	New Mexico
Arizona Wranglers	Vernon Maxwell	LB	Arizona State
Arizona Wranglers	Glenn McCormick	C	Arizona
Arizona Wranglers	Alvin Moore	RB	Arizona State
Arizona Wranglers	Tony Neely	DB	Arizona
Arizona Wranglers	Dave Osborn	QB	New Mexico
Arizona Wranglers	Glenn Perkins	LB	Arizona
Arizona Wranglers	Mike Richardson	DB	Arizona State
Arizona Wranglers	Chris Schultz	T	Arizona
Arizona Wranglers	Ron Sowers	G	Arizona State
Arizona Wranglers	Ron Thomas	LB	Northern Arizona
Arizona Wranglers	Kevin Ward	WR	Arizona
Arizona Wranglers	Ron Wetzel	TE	Arizona State
Birmingham Stallions	Joe Beazley	G	Alabama
Birmingham Stallions	Gary Bramblett	G	Alabama
Birmingham Stallions	Melvin Brown	DB	Mississippi
Birmingham Stallions	Jeremiah Castille	DB	Alabama
Birmingham Stallions	Bob Cayavec	T	Alabama
Birmingham Stallions	Jackie Cline	DT	Alabama
Birmingham Stallions	Dennis Collier	DB	Auburn
Birmingham Stallions	Tony Dalton	G	Mississippi
Birmingham Stallions	Jeff Fagan	RB	Alabama
Birmingham Stallions	Mike Harmon	WR	Mississippi
Birmingham Stallions	Bob Harris	DB	Auburn
Birmingham Stallions	Steve Herring	C	Mississippi
Birmingham Stallions	Scott Homan	DT	Alabama
Birmingham Stallions	Robbie Jones	LB	Alabama
Birmingham Stallions	Peter Kim	K	Alabama
Birmingham Stallions	James Lane	LB	Alabama State
Birmingham Stallions	Eddie Lowe	DB	Alabama
Birmingham Stallions	Chris Martin	LB	Auburn
Birmingham Stallions	Steve Mott	C	Alabama
Birmingham Stallions	Pat Phenix	T	Mississippi
Birmingham Stallions	Mike Pitts	DE	Alabama
Birmingham Stallions	Bishop Reeves	C	Auburn
Birmingham Stallions	Earl Stewart	LB	Alabama State
Birmingham Stallions	Andre Thomas	RB	Mississippi
Birmingham Stallions	Tommy Wilcox	DB	Alabama
Birmingham Stallions	Russ Wood	TE	Alabama
Boston Breakers	Jack Belcher	C	Boston College
Boston Breakers	Todd Brown	WR	Nebraska
Boston Breakers	Mike Corbat	G	Harvard
Boston Breakers	Roger Craig	RB	Nebraska
Boston Breakers	Vic Crawford	DB	Boston College
Boston Breakers	Paul Farren	C	Boston University
Boston Breakers	Doug Guyer	LB	Boston College
Boston Breakers	Wilbur Jackson	T	Massachusetts
Boston Breakers	Brad Johnson	C	Nebraska
Boston Breakers	Russ Joyner	LB	Boston College
Boston Breakers	Gary Kowalski	T	Boston College
Boston Breakers	Mitch Krenk	TE	Nebraska
Boston Breakers	Scott LaFond	G	Massachusetts
Boston Breakers	Steve Lively	G	Boston College
Boston Breakers	Allen Lyday	DB	Nebraska
Boston Breakers	Mike Mandelko	G	Nebraska
Boston Breakers	Bruce Mathison	QB	Nebraska
Boston Breakers	Jeff Merrell	DT	Nebraska
Boston Breakers	Scott Nizolek	TE	Boston College
Boston Breakers	Garry Pearson	RB	Massachusetts
Boston Breakers	Junior Poles	DT	Boston College
Boston Breakers	Dave Rimington	C	Nebraska
Boston Breakers	Rich Shrigley	TE	Boston College
Boston Breakers	Randy Theiss	T	Nebraska
Boston Breakers	Jamie Williams	TE	Nebraska
Boston Breakers	Toby Williams	DT	Nebraska
Chicago Blitz	Larry Alleyne	LB	Northern Illinois
Chicago Blitz	Charles Armstead	DB	Illinois
Chicago Blitz	Rich Barrent	G	Northern Illinois
Chicago Blitz	Mike Bass	K	Illinois
Chicago Blitz	Dennis Bishop	DB	Illinois
Chicago Blitz	Darryl Byrd	LB	Illinois
Chicago Blitz	Phil Carter	RB	Notre Dame
Chicago Blitz	Bob Clasby	DE	Notre Dame
Chicago Blitz	Joe Curtis	RB	Illinois
Chicago Blitz	Dave Duerson	DB	Notre Dame
Chicago Blitz	Tony Eason	QB	Illinois
Chicago Blitz	Mark Fischer	C	Notre Dame
Chicago Blitz	Dan Gregus	DE	Illinois
Chicago Blitz	Chris Hinton	T	Northwestern
Chicago Blitz	Tony Hunter	TE	Notre Dame
Chicago Blitz	J.D. Johnson	DE	Western Illinois
Chicago Blitz	Adam Lingner	C	Illinois
Chicago Blitz	Mike Martin	WR	Illinois
Chicago Blitz	Larry Moriarty	RB	Notre Dame
Chicago Blitz	Bob Pratt	G	Northwestern
Chicago Blitz	John Stadnik	T	Western Illinois
Chicago Blitz	Jerome Stelly	WR	Western Illinois
Chicago Blitz	Tom Thayer	G	Notre Dame
Chicago Blitz	Oliver Williams	WR	Illinois
Chicago Blitz	Mark Zavagnin	LB	Notre Dame
Denver Gold	Hasson Arbubakrr	DE	Texas Tech
Denver Gold	Curtis Bennett	WR	West Texas State
Denver Gold	Charles Briscoe	DB	West Texas A&M
Denver Gold	Mike Call	G	Colorado State
Denver Gold	Ray Cone	LB	Colorado
Denver Gold	Kenny Dean	DB	West Texas State
Denver Gold	Rick Farnsworth	DT	Wyoming
Denver Gold	Robin Ham	C	West Texas State
Denver Gold	Anthony Hutchison	RB	Texas Tech
Denver Gold	Dave Joeckel	C	Texas Tech
Denver Gold	Craig Johnson	QB	Wyoming
Denver Gold	Richard Johnson	RB	Colorado
Denver Gold	Robert Johnson	DB	Colorado
Denver Gold	Steve Martinez	WR	Wyoming
Denver Gold	Victor McGee	QB	West Texas State
Denver Gold	Charlie Pattison	DT	Wyoming
Denver Gold	Andy Poremba	DT	Colorado State
Denver Gold	Joe Porter	T	Colorado State
Denver Gold	Jeff Raikes	WR	Colorado State
Denver Gold	Gabriel Rivera	DT	Texas Tech
Denver Gold	Cleveland Robinson	DB	West Texas State
Denver Gold	John Salley	DB	Wyoming
Denver Gold	Mark Shoop	DE	Colorado
Denver Gold	James Williams	TE	Wyoming
Denver Gold	Stan Williams	LB	Texas Tech
Denver Gold	Earl Wilson	WR	West Texas State
Los Angeles Express	George Achica	DT	USC
Los Angeles Express	David Brown	RB	Pacific
Los Angeles Express	Joey Browner	DB	USC
Los Angeles Express	August Curley	LB	USC
Los Angeles Express	Byron Darby	DT	USC
Los Angeles Express	George Dunlap	LB	Pacific
Los Angeles Express	Riki Ellison	LB	USC
Los Angeles Express	Ken Faul	LB	Long Beach State
Los Angeles Express	Anthony Gibson	RB	USC
Los Angeles Express	Clint Hampton	DT	USC
Los Angeles Express	John Harvey	DT	USC
Los Angeles Express	Russ Jensen	QB	California Lutheran
Los Angeles Express	Darren Long	TE	Long Beach State
Los Angeles Express	Bruce Matthews	G	USC
Los Angeles Express	Pat McCool	TE	USC
Los Angeles Express	Darryl Moore	T	USC
Los Angeles Express	Don Mosebar	T	USC
Los Angeles Express	Joe Murray	G	USC
Los Angeles Express	Jeff Simmons	WR	USC
Los Angeles Express	Glen Slough	LB	California Lutheran
Los Angeles Express	Tim Sullivan	LB	USC
Los Angeles Express	Kelly Thomas	T	USC
Los Angeles Express	Rodney Weber	DB	Fullerton State
Los Angeles Express	Troy West	DB	USC
Los Angeles Express	Timmy White	WR	USC
Los Angeles Express	Rod Williams	DB	USC
Michigan Panthers	Ray Bentley	LB	Central Michigan
Michigan Panthers	Marion Body	DB	Michigan
Michigan Panthers	Novo Bojovic	K	Central Michigan
Michigan Panthers	Bonji Bonner	DB	Eastern Michigan
Michigan Panthers	Keith Bostic	DB	Michigan
Michigan Panthers	Winfred Carraway	DE	Michigan
Michigan Panthers	Anthony Carter	WR	Michigan
Michigan Panthers	Smiley Creswell	DE	Michigan State
Michigan Panthers	Craig Dunaway	TE	Michigan
Michigan Panthers	Tony Ellis	RB	Michigan State
Michigan Panthers	Paul Girgash	LB	Michigan
Michigan Panthers	Otis Grant	WR	Michigan State
Michigan Panthers	Ali Haji-Sheikh	K	Michigan
Michigan Panthers	Terry Hawkins	RB	Michigan State
Michigan Panthers	Derek Hughes	RB	Michigan State
Michigan Panthers	Ted Jones	WR	Michigan State
Michigan Panthers	John Leister	QB	Michigan State
Michigan Panthers	Mike Lemirande	LB	Michigan
Michigan Panthers	Steve Maidlow	LB	Michigan State
Michigan Panthers	Bob Phillips	WR	Western Michigan
Michigan Panthers	Tom Piette	C	Michigan State
Michigan Panthers	Lawrence Ricks	RB	Michigan
Michigan Panthers	Joe Stevens	DE	Michigan State
Michigan Panthers	Rich Strenger	T	Michigan
Michigan Panthers	Robert Thompson	DB	Michigan
Michigan Panthers	Duane Wilson	T	Western Michigan
New Jersey Generals	Bill Bates	DB	Tennessee
New Jersey Generals	Mike Casteel	DT	Tennessee
New Jersey Generals	Mike Charles	DT	Syracuse
New Jersey Generals	Ted Cirillo	T	Syracuse
New Jersey Generals	Mike Cofer	LB	Tennessee
New Jersey Generals	Alex Falcinelli	K	Rutgers
New Jersey Generals	Gerry Feehery	C	Syracuse
New Jersey Generals	Willie Gault	WR	Tennessee
New Jersey Generals	Steve Haworth	DB	Oklahoma
New Jersey Generals	Lee Jenkins	DB	Tennessee
New Jersey Generals	Kenny Jones	TE	Tennessee
New Jersey Generals	Weldon Ledbetter	RB	Oklahoma
New Jersey Generals	Mike Miller	WR	Tennessee
New Jersey Generals	Joe Nett	G	Syracuse
New Jersey Generals	Rod Pegues	RB	Oklahoma
New Jersey Generals	Bill Pickel	DT	Rutgers
New Jersey Generals	Darryl Songy	DB	Oklahoma
New Jersey Generals	Rich Spitzer	T	Rutgers
New Jersey Generals	Chris Wampler	DT	Tennessee
New Jersey Generals	Mike Weddington	DE	Oklahoma
New Jersey Generals	Steve Williams	G	Oklahoma
New Jersey Generals	Darryal Wilson	WR	Tennessee
New Jersey Generals	Stanley Wilson	RB	Oklahoma
New Jersey Generals	Chet Winters	RB	Oklahoma
New Jersey Generals	Keith Woetzel	LB	Rutgers
New Jersey Generals	Dave Wolf	LB	Colgate
Oakland Invaders	Steve Booker	LB	Cal Poly (San Luis Obispo)
Oakland Invaders	Gill Byrd	CB	San Jose State
Oakland Invaders	Reggie Camp	DE	California
Oakland Invaders	Steve Clarkson	QB	San Jose State
Oakland Invaders	Scott Darrow	K	Fresno State
Oakland Invaders	Rich Dixon	LB	California
Oakland Invaders	Mike Dotterer	RB	Stanford
Oakland Invaders	Chris Dressel	TE	Stanford
Oakland Invaders	Henry Ellard	WR	Fresno State
Oakland Invaders	John Elway	QB	Stanford
Oakland Invaders	Mariet Ford	WR	California
Oakland Invaders	Brian Hawkins	DB	San Jose State
Oakland Invaders	Wes Howell	WR	California
Oakland Invaders	Kevin Jones	LB	Fresno State
Oakland Invaders	Tim Kearse	WR	San Jose State
Oakland Invaders	Tim Lucas	LB	California
Oakland Invaders	Maomao Niko	OG	San Jose State
Oakland Invaders	Stephone Paige	WR	Fresno State
Oakland Invaders	Gary Plummer	LB	California
Oakland Invaders	Chris Rose	T	Stanford
Oakland Invaders	Harvey Salem	T	California
Oakland Invaders	Rich Stachowski	DE	California
Oakland Invaders	Ken Thomas	RB	San Jose State
Oakland Invaders	Vincent White	RB	Stanford
Oakland Invaders	Fred Williams	DB	California
Oakland Invaders	Gary Wimmer	LB	Stanford
Philadelphia Stars	Walker Lee Ashley	DT	Penn State
Philadelphia Stars	Mark Battaglia	C	Penn State
Philadelphia Stars	Reggie Brown	WR	Temple
Philadelphia Stars	Kelvin Bryant	RB	North Carolina
Philadelphia Stars	Joel Coles	RB	Penn State
Philadelphia Stars	Bill Contz	T	Penn State
Philadelphia Stars	Dave Drechsler	G	North Carolina
Philadelphia Stars	Gregg Garrity	WR	Penn State
Philadelphia Stars	Ralph Giacomarro	P	Penn State
Philadelphia Stars	Roger Jackson	DB	Penn State
Philadelphia Stars	Sammy Johnson	DB	North Carolina
Philadelphia Stars	Ken Kelley	LB	Penn State
Philadelphia Stars	Dave Laube	G	Penn State
Philadelphia Stars	Mike McClearn	T	Temple
Philadelphia Stars	Mike McCloskey	TE	Penn State
Philadelphia Stars	Dave Opfar	DT	Penn State
Philadelphia Stars	Dave Paffenroth	LB	Penn State
Philadelphia Stars	Guy Peters	DT	Temple
Philadelphia Stars	Kevin Phelan	WR	Delaware
Philadelphia Stars	Greg Poole	DB	North Carolina
Philadelphia Stars	George Schmitt	DB	Delaware
Philadelphia Stars	Pete Speros	T	Penn State
Philadelphia Stars	Ron Spruill	G	North Carolina
Philadelphia Stars	Chris Ward	LB	North Carolina
Philadelphia Stars	Curt Warner	RB	Penn State
Philadelphia Stars	Mike Wilcher	LB	North Carolina
Tampa Bay Bandits	Troy Anderson	DB	Bethune-Cookman
Tampa Bay Bandits	Val Brown	LB	Florida
Tampa Bay Bandits	Harvey Clayton	DB	Florida State
Tampa Bay Bandits	Darryl Crane	WR	Bethune-Cookman
Tampa Bay Bandits	Ivory Curry	DB	Florida
Tampa Bay Bandits	Chris Faulkner	TE	Florida
Tampa Bay Bandits	Dan Fike	T	Florida
Tampa Bay Bandits	Warren Hanna	DB	Florida State
Tampa Bay Bandits	Tony Hayes	LB	Florida A&M
Tampa Bay Bandits	Fernando Jackson	LB	Florida
Tampa Bay Bandits	Spencer Jackson	WR	Florida
Tampa Bay Bandits	Alonzo Johnson	DE	Florida A&M
Tampa Bay Bandits	Andra Jones	DB	Albany State
Tampa Bay Bandits	James Jones	RB	Florida
Tampa Bay Bandits	Wayne Jones	DB	Bethune-Cookman
Tampa Bay Bandits	Nathaniel Koonce	QB	Florida A&M
Tampa Bay Bandits	Clyde Mackey	RB	Albany State
Tampa Bay Bandits	Frank Middleton	RB	Florida A&M
Tampa Bay Bandits	Zeke Mowatt	TE	Florida State
Tampa Bay Bandits	Mike Mularkey	TE	Florida
Tampa Bay Bandits	Nate Newton	T	Florida A&M
Tampa Bay Bandits	Dan Plonk	G	Florida
Tampa Bay Bandits	Billy Rolle	DB	Florida A&M
Tampa Bay Bandits	John Whittaker	DT	Florida
Tampa Bay Bandits	Ricky Williams	RB	Florida State
Tampa Bay Bandits	Tyrone Young	WR	Florida
Washington Federals	Cliff Austin	RB	Clemson
Washington Federals	Dan Benish	DE	Clemson
Washington Federals	Gary Brown	G	Clemson
Washington Federals	Gurnest Brown	DT	Maryland
Washington Federals	Brian Butcher	G	Clemson
Washington Federals	Rod Caldwell	DT	Maryland
Washington Federals	Pat Chester	DB	Virginia
Washington Federals	Mike Corvino	DT	Maryland
Washington Federals	Bubba Diggs	TE	Clemson
Washington Federals	Mark Duda	DT	Maryland
Washington Federals	Andy Headen	LB	Clemson
Washington Federals	Homer Jordan	QB	Clemson
Washington Federals	Terry Kinard	DB	Clemson
Washington Federals	Frank Magwood	WR	Clemson
Washington Federals	Bob Mayberry	T	Clemson
Washington Federals	Jeff McCall	RB	Clemson
Washington Federals	Chuck McSwain	RB	Clemson
Washington Federals	Mike Muller	LB	Maryland
Washington Federals	Dave Pacella	T	Maryland
Washington Federals	Andrew Provence	DT	South Carolina
Washington Federals	Johnny Rembert	LB	Clemson
Washington Federals	Rich Scherer	TE	Richmond
Washington Federals	Harry Skipper	DB	South Carolina
Washington Federals	Dave Sullivan	T	Virginia
Washington Federals	John Tice	TE	Maryland
Washington Federals	Danny Triplett	LB	Clemson
