= 1982 Nebraska vs. Penn State football game =

- Non-conference game
Nebraska Cornhuskers	Penn State Nittany Lions
(2–0)	(3–0)
24	27
Head coach: Tom Osborne	Head coach: Joe Paterno
AP / Coaches; 2 / 2	AP / Coaches; 8 / 6
	1	2	3	4	Total
Nebraska	0	7	7	10	24
Penn State	7	7	7	6	27
- Date: September 25, 1982
- Season: 1982
- Stadium: Beaver Stadium
- Location: State College, Pennsylvania
- Favorite: Nebraska
- Referee: Bill Parkinson
- Attendance: 85,304

United States TV coverage
- Network: CBS
- Announcers: Gary Bender and Pat Haden

The 1982 Nebraska vs. Penn State football game was a college football game between the Nebraska Cornhuskers and Penn State Nittany Lions on September 25, 1982 at Beaver Stadium in State College, Pennsylvania. It served as a catalyst for Penn State's first national championship and is remembered for a controversial officiating decision in the final seconds.

== Background ==
Penn State was ranked eighth in the AP poll, 3–0 with victories over Temple, Maryland, and Rutgers. Nebraska traveled to Happy Valley ranked second nationally after a pair of dominant victories to open the season. Both head coaches, Tom Osborne and Joe Paterno, were seeking their first major-poll national championship.

== Game summary ==
Penn State opened the scoring late in first quarter on a six-play, 83-yard drive that ended in a touchdown pass from Todd Blackledge to Kirk Bowman. Eight minutes later, a short Curt Warner score capped another lengthy drive to give the Nittany Lions a two-touchdown lead. The deficit forced a normally run-heavy Nebraska team to throw the ball, and the Cornhuskers got on the board just before halftime with seven consecutive passes to make the score 14–7. NU quarterback Turner Gill finished with thirty-four pass attempts, the most he ever attempted in a game.

Penn State mounted a third lengthy drive to start the second half, taking a 21–7 lead on a touchdown pass from Blackledge to Kenny Jackson. Nebraska responded with a fifteen-play drive to cut the deficit back to seven. On the ensuing drive, NU recovered a fumble by Penn State backup tailback Skeeter Nichols (playing in relief of an injured Warner) near midfield, converting it into a field goal to make the score 21–17.

With a chance to take a double-digit lead late in the fourth quarter, Blackledge was intercepted in the end zone. Nebraska mounted an 80-yard drive to take a 24–21 lead with 1:18 remaining, its first lead of the game.

=== Final drive ===
Nebraska's David Ridder was flagged for a personal foul on the ensuing kickoff, giving Penn State the ball at the 35-yard line. Blackledge led Penn State deep into NU territory, converting a fourth-and-eleven on a completion to Jackson. With thirteen seconds to go, Blackledge threw a 15-yard pass to Mike McCloskey along the sideline. Replays appeared to show McCloskey stepping out of bounds before securing the pass, but it was ruled a completion.

Without instant replay to overturn the call, Penn State had first-and-goal at the two-yard-line with nine seconds remaining. On the next play, Blackledge connected with Bowman in back of the end zone. Nebraska defenders again protested unsuccessfully, claiming the pass hit the ground. A missed extra point made the final score 27–24.

=== Scoring summary ===
Qtr	Time	Team	Detail	NU	PSU
1	1:43	PSU	Kirk Bowman 14-yd pass from Todd Blackledge (Massimo Manca kick)	0	7
2	8:51	PSU	Curt Warner 2-yd run (Manca kick)	0	14
2	0:38	NU	Irving Fryar 38-yd pass from Turner Gill (Kevin Seibel kick)	7	14
3	9:42	PSU	Kenny Jackson 18-yd pass from Blackledge (Manca kick)	7	21
3	3:28	NU	Mike Rozier 2-yd pass from Gill (Seibel kick)	14	21
4	13:02	NU	Seibel 37-yd field goal	17	21
4	1:18	NU	Gill 1-yd run (Seibel kick)	24	21
4	0:04	PSU	Bowman 2-yd pass from Blackledge	24	27

== Aftermath ==
=== Rest of the season ===
Nebraska won the remainder of its games, including a narrow victory over LSU in the Orange Bowl, finishing the season ranked third in both major polls. Penn State lost to Alabama weeks after its victory over Nebraska, but won the rest of its games to finish 11–1. Paterno sealed his first national championship with a 27–23 victory over top-ranked Georgia and Heisman Trophy winner Herschel Walker in the Sugar Bowl. The Nebraska game is considered the signature win of Penn State's national championship season.

The teams met in the opening week of 1983, a 44–6 victory for top-ranked Nebraska in the inaugural Kickoff Classic at Giants Stadium.

=== McCloskey's catch ===
In 1998, McCloskey admitted at a speaking engagement in Omaha that he was out of bounds. Blackledge became a television analyst and later referred to the play as "perhaps the worst call in Nebraska history;" even Paterno suggested the pass "might have been incomplete." The corner of the field where the catch was made became known as "McCloskey's corner."
