= Wingle =

Wingle may refer to:

- Blake Wingle (born 1960), a former Guard in the National Football League
- Mikayla Wingle, former contestant on American reality television show Survivor
- Great Wall Wingle, a pickup truck manufactured by the Chinese company Great Wall Motors since 2006

== See also ==
- Wingles, a commune of the Pas-de-Calais department of France
