= 1982 Penn State Nittany Lions football team =

American college football season

1982 Penn State Nittany Lions football

Consensus national champion Sugar Bowl champion Eastern champion

Sugar Bowl, W 27–23 vs. Georgia
- Conference: Independent

Ranking
- Coaches: No. 1
- AP: No. 1
- Record: 11–1
- Head coach: Joe Paterno (17th season)
- Offensive coordinator: Dick Anderson (2nd season)
- Offensive scheme: Pro-style
- Defensive coordinator: Jerry Sandusky (6th season)
- Base defense: 4–3
- Captains: Walker Lee Ashley; Ken Kelley; Stuart McMunn; Pete Speros
- Home stadium: Beaver Stadium • University Park, Pennsylvania

1982 Major eastern college football independents records
| | Conf. | | | | | Overall |
| Team | W | | L | | T | W | | L | | T |
|---|---|---|---|---|---|---|---|---|---|---|
| No. 1 Penn State $ | 6 | – | 0 | – | 0 | 11 | – | 1 | – | 0 |
| No. 10 Pittsburgh | 4 | – | 1 | – | 0 | 9 | – | 3 | – | 0 |
| No. 19 West Virginia | 4 | – | 2 | – | 0 | 9 | – | 3 | – | 0 |
| Boston College | 3 | – | 2 | – | 0 | 8 | – | 3 | – | 1 |
| Rutgers | 1 | – | 5 | – | 0 | 5 | – | 6 | – | 0 |
| Temple | 1 | – | 5 | – | 0 | 4 | – | 7 | – | 0 |
| Syracuse | 1 | – | 5 | – | 0 | 2 | – | 9 | – | 0 |
$ – Lambert Trophy Winner; Rankings from AP Poll

1982 NCAA Division I-A independents football records
| | Conf. | | | | | Overall |
| Team | W | | L | | T | W | | L | | T |
|---|---|---|---|---|---|---|---|---|---|---|
| No. 1 Penn State | | – | | – | | 11 | – | 1 | – | 0 |
| No. 10 Pittsburgh | | – | | – | | 9 | – | 3 | – | 0 |
| No. 13 Florida State | | – | | – | | 9 | – | 3 | – | 0 |
| No. 19 West Virginia | | – | | – | | 9 | – | 3 | – | 0 |
| Boston College | | – | | – | | 8 | – | 3 | – | 1 |
| Southwestern Louisiana | | – | | – | | 7 | – | 3 | – | 1 |
| East Carolina | | – | | – | | 7 | – | 4 | – | 0 |
| Miami (FL) | | – | | – | | 7 | – | 4 | – | 0 |
| Southern Miss | | – | | – | | 7 | – | 4 | – | 0 |
| Virginia Tech | | – | | – | | 7 | – | 4 | – | 0 |
| Notre Dame | | – | | – | | 6 | – | 4 | – | 1 |
| Cincinnati | | – | | – | | 6 | – | 5 | – | 0 |
| Georgia Tech | | – | | – | | 6 | – | 5 | – | 0 |
| Navy | | – | | – | | 6 | – | 5 | – | 0 |
| Louisville | | – | | – | | 5 | – | 6 | – | 0 |
| Rutgers | | – | | – | | 5 | – | 6 | – | 0 |
| Army | | – | | – | | 4 | – | 7 | – | 0 |
| South Carolina | | – | | – | | 4 | – | 7 | – | 0 |
| Temple | | – | | – | | 4 | – | 7 | – | 0 |
| Tulane | | – | | – | | 4 | – | 7 | – | 0 |
| Syracuse | | – | | – | | 2 | – | 9 | – | 0 |
| Memphis State | | – | | – | | 1 | – | 10 | – | 0 |
Rankings from AP Poll

The 1982 Penn State Nittany Lions football team represented Pennsylvania State University as an independent during the 1982 NCAA Division I-A football season. Led by 17th-year head coach Joe Paterno, the Nittany Lions compiled a record of 11–1. Penn State defeated the Georgia Bulldogs, 27–23, in the Sugar Bowl to win Paterno's first consensus national championship. The team was selected national champion by AP, Billingsley, DeVold, Dunkel, FACT, FB News, Football Research, FW, Litkenhous, Matthews, NCF, NFF, The New York Times, Poling, Sagarin, Sagarin (ELO-Chess), Sporting News, UPI/coaches, and USA/CNN, while named co-champion by Helms.

== Schedule ==
| Date | Time | Opponent | Rank | Site | TV | Result | Attendance | Source |
|---|---|---|---|---|---|---|---|---|
| September 4 | 1:30 p.m. | Temple | No. 8 | Beaver Stadium; University Park, PA | ESPN (tape delay) | W 31–14 | 80,000 | |
| September 11 | 1:30 p.m. | Maryland | No. 7 | Beaver Stadium; University Park, PA (rivalry) | TCS | W 39–31 | 84,597 | |
| September 18 | 1:30 p.m. | Rutgers | No. 8 | Beaver Stadium; University Park, PA | TCS | W 49–14 | 83,268 | |
| September 25 | 3:50 p.m. | No. 2 Nebraska | No. 8 | Beaver Stadium; University Park, PA | CBS | W 27–24 | 85,304 | |
| October 9 | 1:30 p.m. | at No. 4 Alabama | No. 3 | Legion Field; Birmingham, AL (rivalry) | CBS | L 21–42 | 76,821 | |
| October 16 | 1:30 p.m. | Syracuse^{†} | No. 8 | Beaver Stadium; University Park, PA (rivalry) | TCS | W 28–7 | 84,762 | |
| October 23 | 1:30 p.m. | at No. 13 West Virginia | No. 9 | Mountaineer Field; Morgantown, WV (rivalry) | USA | W 24–0 | 60,958 | |
| October 30 | 1:30 p.m. | at Boston College | No. 8 | Alumni Stadium; Chestnut Hill, MA | TCS | W 52–17 | 33,205 | |
| November 6 | 1:30 p.m. | NC State | No. 7 | Beaver Stadium; University Park, PA | TCS | W 54–0 | 84,837 | |
| November 13 | 3:50 p.m. | at No. 13 Notre Dame | No. 5 | Notre Dame Stadium; Notre Dame, IN (rivalry) | ABC | W 24–14 | 59,075 | |
| November 26 | 12:30 p.m. | No. 5 Pittsburgh | No. 2 | Beaver Stadium; University Park, PA (rivalry) | ABC | W 19–10 | 85,522 | |
| January 1, 1983 | 8:00 p.m. | vs. No. 1 Georgia | No. 2 | Louisiana Superdome; New Orleans, LA (Sugar Bowl) | ABC | W 27–23 | 78,124 | |
^{†}Homecoming; Rankings from AP Poll released prior to the game; All times are in Eastern time

== Rankings ==
Ranking movements Legend: ██ Increase in ranking ██ Decrease in ranking ( ) = First-place votes
| | Week | | | | | | | | | | | | | | | |
| Poll | Pre | 1 | 2 | 3 | 4 | 5 | 6 | 7 | 8 | 9 | 10 | 11 | 12 | 13 | 14 | Final |
|---|---|---|---|---|---|---|---|---|---|---|---|---|---|---|---|---|
| AP | 8 | 7 | 8 | 8 | 3 (7) | 3 (9) | 8 | 9 | 8 | 7 | 5 (1) | 3 (2) | 2 (2) | 2 (2) | 2 | 1 (44) |
| UPI | 5 | 5* | 8 | 5 | 3 (3) | 3 (6) | 10 | 8 (1) | 7 | 6 | 4 (1) | 3 (3) | 2 (2) | 2 (2) | 2 (3) | 1 (33) |

* A new poll was not released for this week, so for comparison purposes, the previous week's ranking is inserted in this week's slot.

== Game summaries ==
=== Temple ===
Temple vs. Penn State – Game summary

| Quarter | 1 | 2 | 3 | 4 | Total |
|---|---|---|---|---|---|
| Temple | 0 | 7 | 0 | 7 | 14 |
| #8 Penn State | 21 | 3 | 0 | 7 | 31 |

at Beaver Stadium • University Park, Pennsylvania

- Date: September 4
- Game time: 1:30 PM EDT
- Game attendance: 80,000
- Referee: William Parkinson
- TV announcers (ESPN): Jim Simpson, Bud Wilkinson

Game information

First Quarter

- PSU – Warner, 40-yard TD pass from Blackledge, Manca kick good, (PSU 7–0)
- PSU – Baugh, 31-yard TD pass from Blackledge, Manca kick good, (PSU 14–0)
- PSU – Williams, 16-yard TD pass from Blackledge, Manca kick good, (PSU 21–0)

Second Quarter

- TU – Slade, 1-yard TD pass from Riordan, Clauser kick good, (PSU 21–7)
- PSU – Manca, 37-yard field goal, (PSU 24–7)

Third Quarter

No scoring

Fourth Quarter

- PSU – Williams, 4-yard TD pass from Blackledge, Manca kick good, (PSU 31–7)
- TU – Brown, 14-yard TD pass from Riordan, Clauser kick good, (PSU 31–14)

Top passers

- TU –
- PSU –

Top rushers

- TU –
- PSU –

Top receivers

- TU –
- PSU –

Top defenders

- TU –
- PSU –

=== Maryland ===
Maryland vs. Penn State – Game summary

| Quarter | 1 | 2 | 3 | 4 | Total |
|---|---|---|---|---|---|
| Maryland | 3 | 7 | 14 | 7 | 31 |
| #7 Penn State | 3 | 17 | 9 | 10 | 39 |

at Beaver Stadium • University Park, Pennsylvania

- Date: September 11
- Game time: 1:30 PM EDT
- Game attendance: 84,597
- Referee: J. Vincent Price
- TV announcers (TCS): Stan Savran, George Paterno

Game information

First Quarter

- PSU –
- MD –

Second Quarter

- PSU –
- PSU –
- MD –
- PSU –

Third Quarter

- MD –
- PSU –
- MD –
- PSU –

Fourth Quarter

- PSU –
- MD –
- PSU –

Top passers

- MD –
- PSU –

Top rushers

- MD –
- PSU –

Top receivers

- MD –
- PSU –

Top defenders

- MD –
- PSU –

=== Rutgers ===
Rutgers vs. Penn State – Game summary

| Quarter | 1 | 2 | 3 | 4 | Total |
|---|---|---|---|---|---|
| Rutgers | 7 | 7 | 0 | 0 | 14 |
| #5 Penn State | 7 | 14 | 14 | 14 | 49 |

at Beaver Stadium • University Park, Pennsylvania

- Date: September 18
- Game time: 1:30 PM EDT
- Game attendance: 83,268
- Referee: Thomas Thamert
- TV announcers (TCS): Stan Savran, George Paterno

Game information

First Quarter

- PSU –
- RUT –

Second Quarter

- PSU –
- PSU –
- RUT –

Third Quarter

- PSU –
- PSU –

Fourth Quarter

- PSU –
- PSU –

Top passers

- RUT –
- PSU –

Top rushers

- RUT –
- PSU –

Top receivers

- RUT –
- PSU –

Top defenders

- RUT –
- PSU –

=== #2 Nebraska ===
Nebraska vs. Penn State – Game summary

| Quarter | 1 | 2 | 3 | 4 | Total |
|---|---|---|---|---|---|
| #2 Nebraska | 0 | 7 | 7 | 10 | 24 |
| #8 Penn State | 7 | 7 | 7 | 6 | 27 |

at Beaver Stadium • University Park, Pennsylvania

- Date: September 25
- Game time: 3:50 PM EDT
- Game attendance: 85,304
- Referee: William Parkinson
- TV announcers (CBS): Gary Bender, Pat Haden

Game information

First Quarter

- PSU –

Second Quarter

- PSU –
- NEB –

Third Quarter

- PSU –
- NEB –

Fourth Quarter

- NEB –
- NEB –
- PSU –

Top passers

- NEB –
- PSU –

Top rushers

- NEB –
- PSU –

Top receivers

- NEB –
- PSU –

Top defenders

- NEB –
- PSU –

=== #4 Alabama ===
Penn State vs. Alabama – Game summary

| Quarter | 1 | 2 | 3 | 4 | Total |
|---|---|---|---|---|---|
| #3 Penn State | 7 | 0 | 7 | 7 | 21 |
| #4 Alabama | 7 | 14 | 3 | 18 | 42 |

at Legion Field • Birmingham, Alabama

- Date: October 9
- Game time: 1:30 PM EDT
- Game attendance: 76,821
- TV announcers (CBS): Gary Bender, Pat Haden

Game information

First Quarter

- ALA –
- PSU –

Second Quarter

- ALA –
- ALA –

Third Quarter

- PSU –
- ALA –

Fourth Quarter

- PSU –
- ALA –
- ALA –
- ALA –

Top passers

- PSU –
- ALA –

Top rushers

- PSU –
- ALA –

Top receivers

- PSU –
- ALA –

Top defenders

- PSU –
- ALA –

=== Syracuse ===
Syracuse vs. Penn State – Game summary

| Quarter | 1 | 2 | 3 | 4 | Total |
|---|---|---|---|---|---|
| Syracuse | 0 | 7 | 0 | 0 | 7 |
| #8 Penn State | 7 | 14 | 0 | 7 | 28 |

at Beaver Stadium • University Park, Pennsylvania

- Date: October 16
- Game time: 1:30 PM EDT
- Game attendance: 84,762
- TV announcers (TCS): Stan Savran, George Paterno

Game information

First Quarter

- PSU –

Second Quarter

- PSU –
- SU –
- PSU –

Third Quarter

No scoring

Fourth Quarter

- PSU –

Top passers

- SU –
- PSU –

Top rushers

- SU –
- PSU –

Top receivers

- SU –
- PSU –

Top defenders

- SU –
- PSU –

=== #13 West Virginia ===
Penn State vs. West Virginia – Game summary

| Quarter | 1 | 2 | 3 | 4 | Total |
|---|---|---|---|---|---|
| #9 Penn State | 3 | 7 | 0 | 14 | 24 |
| #13 West Virginia | 0 | 0 | 0 | 0 | 0 |

at Mountaineer Field • Morgantown, West Virginia

- Date: October 23
- Game time: 1:00 PM EDT
- Game attendance: 60,958
- TV: USA

Game information

First Quarter

- PSU – Gancitano, 31-yard field goal, 6:14 (PSU 3–0)

Second Quarter

- PSU – Williams, 4-yard TD run, Gancitano kick good, 1:57 (PSU 10–0)

Third Quarter

No scoring

Fourth Quarter

- PSU – Radecic 85-yard interception return for TD, Gancitano kick good, 11:29 (PSU 17–0)
- PSU – Jackson, 9-yard TD run, Gancitano kick good, 2:42 (PSU 24–0)

Top passers

- PSU –
- WVU –

Top rushers

- PSU –
- WVU –

Top receivers

- PSU –
- WVU –

Top defenders

- PSU –
- WVU –

=== Boston College ===
Penn State vs. Boston College – Game summary

| Quarter | 1 | 2 | 3 | 4 | Total |
|---|---|---|---|---|---|
| #8 Penn State | 14 | 17 | 7 | 14 | 52 |
| Boston College | 7 | 3 | 0 | 7 | 17 |

at Alumni Stadium• Chestnut Hill, Massachusetts

- Date: October 30
- Game time: 1:30 PM EDT
- Game attendance: 33,205
- TV announcers (TCS): Stan Savran, George Paterno

Game information

First Quarter

- BC –
- PSU –
- PSU –

Second Quarter

- PSU –
- PSU –
- BC –
- PSU –

Third Quarter

- PSU –

Fourth Quarter

- BC –
- PSU –
- PSU –

Top passers

- PSU –
- BC –

Top rushers

- PSU –
- BC –

Top receivers

- PSU –
- BC –

Top defenders

- PSU –
- BC –

=== North Carolina State ===
North Carolina State vs. Penn State – Game summary

| Quarter | 1 | 2 | 3 | 4 | Total |
|---|---|---|---|---|---|
| North Carolina State | 0 | 0 | 0 | 0 | 0 |
| #7 Penn State | 17 | 9 | 21 | 7 | 54 |

at Beaver Stadium • University Park, Pennsylvania

- Date: November 6
- Game time: 1:30 PM EST
- Game attendance: 84,762
- Referee: Thomas Thamert
- TV announcers (TCS): Stan Savran, George Paterno

Game information

First Quarter

- PSU –
- PSU –
- PSU –

Second Quarter

- PSU –
- PSU –

Third Quarter

- PSU –
- PSU –
- PSU –

Fourth Quarter

- PSU –

Top passers

- NCST –
- PSU –

Top rushers

- NCST –
- PSU –

Top receivers

- NCST –
- PSU –

Top defenders

- NCST –
- PSU –

=== vs #13 Notre Dame ===
No. 5 Penn State Nittany Lions (8–1) vs. No. 13 Notre Dame Fighting Irish (6–1–1) – Game summary

| Quarter | 1 | 2 | 3 | 4 | Total |
|---|---|---|---|---|---|
| No. 5 Nittany Lions | 0 | 13 | 0 | 11 | 24 |
| No. 13 Fighting Irish | 7 | 7 | 0 | 0 | 14 |

at Notre Dame Stadium • Notre Dame, Indiana

- Date: November 13, 1982
- Game time: 3:50 p.m. EST
- Game attendance: 59,075
- Referee: Tom Quinn
- TV announcers (ABC): Keith Jackson (play-by-play), Frank Broyles (color commentator), and Tim Brant (sideline reporter)

Game information

First Quarter

- ND – Chris Smith 8-yard TD pass from Ken Karcher, Mike Johnston kick good, 7:27 (ND 7–0)

Second Quarter

- PSU – Todd Blackledge 1-yard TD run, Nick Gancitano kick good, 10:22 (TIE 7–7)
- PSU – Nick Gancitano 41-yard field goal, 8:07 (PSU 10–7)
- PSU – Nick Gancitano 29-yard field goal, 1:41 (PSU 13–7)
- ND – Allen Pinkett 93-yard TD kickoff return, Mike Johnston kick good, 1:27 (ND 14–13)

Third Quarter

No scoring

Fourth Quarter

- PSU – Curt Warner 48-yard TD pass from Todd Blackledge, pass failed, 13:36 (PSU 19–14)
- PSU – Safety, Allen Pinkett tackled by Walker Lee Ashley in end zone, 13:28 (PSU 21–14)
- PSU – Nick Gancitano 27-yard field goal, 3:11 (PSU 24–14)

| Statistics | PSU | ND |
|---|---|---|
| First downs | | |
| Total yards | | |
| Rushing yards | | |
| Passing yards | | |
| Passing: comp–att–int | | |
| Time of possession | | |

| Team | Category | Player | Statistics |
|---|---|---|---|
| Penn State | Passing | | |
| Penn State | Rushing | | |
| Penn State | Receiving | | |
| Notre Dame | Passing | | |
| Notre Dame | Rushing | | |
| Notre Dame | Receiving | | |

Officials

| Game | Position | Name |
|---|---|---|
| at #13 Notre Dame | Referee | Tom Quinn |
| at #13 Notre Dame | Umpire | Don McDonnell |
| at #13 Notre Dame | Linesman | Otto Puls |
| at #13 Notre Dame | Line Judge | Richard Farina |
| at #13 Notre Dame | Filed Judge | Larry Nemmers |
| at #13 Notre Dame | Back Judge | Weldon Waites |

=== No. 5 Pittsburgh ===
No. 5 Pittsburgh Panthers (9–1) vs No. 2 Penn State Nittany Lions (9–1) – Game summary

| Quarter | 1 | 2 | 3 | 4 | Total |
|---|---|---|---|---|---|
| No. 5 Panthers | 0 | 7 | 0 | 3 | 10 |
| No. 2 Nittany Lions | 3 | 0 | 10 | 6 | 19 |

at Beaver Stadium • University Park, Pennsylvania

- Date: November 26, 1982
- Game time: 12:30 p.m. EST
- Game attendance: 85,722
- Referee: Raymond Bower
- TV announcers (ABC): Al Michaels (play-by-play), Lee Grosscup (color commentator), and Tim Brant (sideline reporter)

Game information

First Quarter

- PSU – Nick Gancitano, 26-yard field goal, (PSU 3–0)

Second Quarter

- PITT – Bryan Thomas 4-yard TD run, Eric Schubert kick, (PITT 7–3)

Third Quarter

- PSU – Kenny Jackson 31-yard TD pass from Todd Blackledge, Nick Gancitano kick, (PSU 10–7)
- PSU – Nick Gancitano, 31-yard field goal, (PSU 13–7)

Fourth Quarter

- PSU – Nick Gancitano, 19-yard field goal, (PSU 16–7)
- PITT – Eric Schubert, 17-yard field goal, (PSU 16–10)
- PSU – Nick Gancitano, 29-yard field goal, (PSU 19–10)

| Statistics | PITT | PSU |
|---|---|---|
| First downs | | |
| Total yards | | |
| Rushing yards | | |
| Passing yards | | |
| Passing: comp–att–int | | |
| Time of possession | | |

| Team | Category | Player | Statistics |
|---|---|---|---|
| Pittsburgh | Passing | | |
| Pittsburgh | Rushing | | |
| Pittsburgh | Receiving | | |
| Penn State | Passing | | |
| Penn State | Rushing | | |
| Penn State | Receiving | | |

Officials

| Game | Position | Name |
|---|---|---|
| No. 5 Pittsburgh | Referee | Raymond Bower |
| No. 5 Pittsburgh | Umpire | Robert Aebersold |
| No. 5 Pittsburgh | Linesman | Richard Farina |
| No. 5 Pittsburgh | Line Judge | Earl Birdy |
| No. 5 Pittsburgh | Field Judge | Thomas Adams |
| No. 5 Pittsburgh | Back Judge | Paul Lattanzi |

=== vs No. 1 Georgia (1983 Sugar Bowl) ===
| Overall record | Previous meeting | Previous winner |
|---|---|---|
First meeting

1983 Sugar Bowl
No. 2 Penn State Nittany Lions (10–1) vs No. 1 Georgia Bulldogs (11–0) – Game summary

| Quarter | 1 | 2 | 3 | 4 | Total |
|---|---|---|---|---|---|
| No. 2 Nittany Lions | 7 | 13 | 0 | 7 | 27 |
| No. 1 Bulldogs | 3 | 7 | 7 | 6 | 23 |

at Louisiana Superdome • New Orleans, Louisiana

- Date: January 1, 1983
- Game time: 8:00 p.m. EST
- Game attendance: 78,127
- Referee: Vance Carlson
- TV announcers (ABC): Keith Jackson (play-by-play), Frank Broyles (color commentator), and Jim Lampley (sideline reporter)

Game information

First Quarter

- PSU – Curt Warner 2-yard TD run, Nick Gancitano kick, 12:09 (PSU 7–0)
- UGA – Kevin Butler, 27-yard field goal, 6:05 (PSU 7–3)

Second Quarter

- PSU – Nick Gancitano, 38-yard field goal, 11:47 (PSU 10–3)
- PSU – Curt Warner 9-yard TD run, Nick Gancitano kick, 2:43 (PSU 17–3)
- PSU – Nick Gancitano, 45-yard field goal, 0:44 (PSU 20–3)
- UGA – Herman Archie 10-yard TD pass from John Lastinger, Kevin Butler kick, 0:05 (PSU 20–10)

Third Quarter

- UGA – Herschel Walker 1-yard TD run, Kevin Butler kick, 10:37 (PSU 20–17)

Fourth Quarter

- PSU – Gregg Garrity 47-yard TD pass from Todd Blackledge, Nick Gancitano kick, 13:16 (PSU 27–17)
- UGA – Clarence Kay 9-yard TD pass from John Lastinger, run failed, 3:54 (PSU 27–23)

| Statistics | PSU | UGA |
|---|---|---|
| First downs | 19 | 19 |
| Total yards | 367 | 326 |
| Rushing yards | 44–139 | 46–160 |
| Passing yards | 228 | 166 |
| Passing: comp–att–int | 13–23–0 | 12–28–2 |
| Time of possession | 30:38 | 29:22 |

| Team | Category | Player | Statistics |
|---|---|---|---|
| Penn State | Passing | | |
| Penn State | Rushing | | |
| Penn State | Receiving | | |
| Georgia | Passing | | |
| Georgia | Rushing | | |
| Georgia | Receiving | | |

Officials

| Game | Position | Name |
|---|---|---|
| 1983 Sugar Bowl vs No. 1 Georgia | Referee | Vance Carlson |
| 1983 Sugar Bowl vs No. 1 Georgia | Umpire | Bob Klisares |
| 1983 Sugar Bowl vs No. 1 Georgia | Linesman | Dale Schreurs |
| 1983 Sugar Bowl vs No. 1 Georgia | Line Judge | Kent Houck |
| 1983 Sugar Bowl vs No. 1 Georgia | Field Judge | John Schroeder |
| 1983 Sugar Bowl vs No. 1 Georgia | Back Judge | Artie Palk |

== Roster ==
1982 Penn State Nittany Lions football team roster
Players
Coaches
Offense

| Pos. | # | Name | Class |
|---|---|---|---|
| RB | | Tom Barr |
| OL | | Mark Battaglia |
| WR | | Kevin Baugh |
| QB | 14 | Todd Blackledge | Sr |
| TE | 80 | Kirk Bowman | Jr |
| WR | | Kevin Campbell |
| RB | | Joel Coles |
| OT | 79 | Bill Contz | Sr |
| TE | | Dean DiMidio |
| RB | | Bill Emerson |
| WR | 19 | Gregg Garrity | Sr |
| C | 58 | Nick Haden | So |
| OT | 72 | Ron Heller | Jr |
| WR | 82 | Kenny Jackson | Jr |
| G | 60 | Dave Laube | Sr |
| QB | | Dan Lonergan |
| OL | | Dick Maginnis |
| TE | 81 | Mike McCloskey | Sr |
| RB | 29 | Tony Mumford | So |
| RB | | Skeeter Nichols |
| OL | | Stan Short |
| G | 56 | Pete Speros | Jr |
| QB | | Doug Strang |
| TE | | John Walter |
| RB | 25 | Curt Warner | Sr |
| WR | | Rocky Washington |
| FB | 43 | Jon Williams | So |

Defense

| Pos. | # | Name | Class |
|---|---|---|---|
| LB | | Rogers Alexander |
| CB | 39 | Dan Biondi | Sr |
| CB | 23 | Alvin Cunningham | So |
| CB | 92 | Mark Fruehan | Sr |
| DT | 70 | Greg Gattuso | Jr |
| Hero | 17 | Harry Hamilton | Jr |
| LB | | Al Harris |
| DL | | Joe Hines |
| CB | 49 | Roger Jackson | Sr |
| LB | 98 | Ken Kelley | Sr |
| LB | 37 | Walker Lee Ashley | Sr |
| LB | | Carmen Masciantonio |
| DB | | Brian McCann |
| DT | 65 | Dave Opfar | Sr |
| LB | 33 | Dave Paffenroth | Sr |
| LB | 55 | Rodger Puz | Sr |
| LB | 97 | Scott Radecic | Jr |
| S | 32 | Mark Robinson | Jr |
| DL | | Steve Sefter |
| DB | | Mike Suter |
| DB | | Chris Sydnor |
| DB | | Mike Zordich |

Special teams

| Pos. | # | Name | Class |
|---|---|---|---|
| PK | 13 | Nick Gancitano | So |
| P | 21 | Ralph Giacomarro | Sr |
| PK | 10 | Massimo Manca | Fr |
| P | | George Reynolds |

Head coach

- Joe Paterno

Coordinators/assistant coaches

- Dick Anderson
- John Bove
- Tom Bradley
- Booker Brooks
- Fran Ganter
- Bob Phillips
- John Rosenberg
- Jerry Sandusky
- Jim Williams

Legend

- (C) Team captain
- (S) Suspended
- (I) Ineligible
- Injured
- Redshirt

Roster

== Awards ==
- Todd Blackledge

Davey O'Brien Award

- Joe Paterno

Eddie Robinson Coach of the Year

- Pete Speros

Nittany Lion of the Year

== NFL draft ==
Nine Nittany Lions were drafted in the 1983 NFL draft.

| Round | Pick | Overall | Name | Position | Team |
|---|---|---|---|---|---|
| 1st | 3 | 3 | Curt Warner | Running back | Seattle Seahawks |
| 1st | 7 | 7 | Todd Blackledge | Quarterback | Kansas City Chiefs |
| 3rd | 17 | 73 | Walker Lee Ashley | Linebacker | Minnesota Vikings |
| 4th | 4 | 88 | Mike McCloskey | Tight end | Houston Oilers |
| 5th | 10 | 122 | Bill Contz | Offensive tackle | Cleveland Browns |
| 5th | 28 | 140 | Gregg Garrity | Wide receiver | Pittsburgh Steelers |
| 10th | 8 | 261 | Dave Laube | Offensive guard | Detroit Lions |
| 10th | 10 | 263 | Pete Speros | Offensive guard | Seattle Seahawks |
| 10th | 15 | 268 | Ralph Giacomarro | Punter | Atlanta Falcons |

== Media ==
=== Radio ===
| Flagship station | Play-by-play | Color commentator | Sideline reporter | Studio host |
|---|---|---|---|---|
| WMAJ AM 1450 | Fran Fisher | John Grant | | |
