= Greg Best (American football) =

American football player (born 1960)

No. 25, 24
- Position: Safety

Personal information
- Born: January 14, 1960 (age 66); New Brighton, Pennsylvania, U.S.
- Listed height: 5 ft 10 in (1.78 m)
- Listed weight: 185 lb (84 kg)

Career information
- High school: Blackhawk (Chippewa Township, Pennsylvania)
- College: Kansas State
- NFL draft: 1983: undrafted

Career history
- Pittsburgh Steelers (1983); Cleveland Browns (1984); Pittsburgh Gladiators (1987); New York Knights (1988)

Awards and highlights
- Longest fumble return of 1983 NFL season; First-team All-Big Eight (1982)

Career NFL statistics
- Games played: 20
- Games started: 0
- Fumbles recovered: 1
- Fumble return yards: 94
- Touchdowns: 1
- Stats at Pro Football Reference

Career AFL statistics
- Receptions: 25
- Receiving yards: 394
- Receiving TDs: 5
- Tackles: 24
- Fumble recoveries: 2
- Stats at ArenaFan.com

Gregory Lee Best (born January 14, 1960) is an American former professional football player who was a defensive back in the National Football League (NFL) with the Pittsburgh Steelers and the Cleveland Browns. He played college football for the Kansas State Wildcats.

== Early life ==
Best was born in New Brighton, Pennsylvania and attended Blackhawk High School in nearby Beaver Falls, Pennsylvania. He was named second-team All-Conference in football as a junior and first-team All-Conference his senior year.

== College career ==
He matriculated at Kansas State University where he walked on to the football team as a wide receiver. He became a four-year starter as a cornerback and kickoff returner, although he redshirted his sophomore season due to injury. As a senior in 1982, Best was named to the All-Big Eight Conference team.

He was invited to play in the Blue–Gray Football Classic all-star game following his senior season in 1982. He caught two interceptions in the game and was named the game's defensive MVP.

== Professional career ==
Best went undrafted in the 1983 NFL draft, but was signed shortly after the draft by the Pittsburgh Steelers. He spent training camp with the team, but was among the final roster cuts. The Steelers re-signed Best after the third game of the 1983 season when Eric Williams was placed on the injured reserve list due to an ankle injury.

He played primarily as a special teamer with the Steelers with occasional reps at safety in passing situations. Best's finest performance as a pro came in week seven of 1983 against the rival Cleveland Browns. In that game Best made three tackles in the kicking game, caused an incompletion with a hit on Ozzie Newsome on defense and returned a fumble 94 yards for the game's final score. That 94-yard fumble recovery return was the longest of the season in the NFL.

Best was once again released by the Steelers prior to the 1984 season. He was picked up by the Browns, for whom he played five games in 1984. He later signed with the Memphis Showboats of the United States Football League (USFL), but the league folded before he had a chance to play. His bad luck continued when he signed with the Montreal Alouettes of the Canadian Football League only to see that team also fold before he could join them.

Best finished his playing career in 1988 after stints with the Pittsburgh Gladiators and the New York Knights of the Arena Football League.

== Post-football career ==
Since leaving football, Best has worked as a general contractor.

== Personal ==
Best married Donna Wickline in 1982. They have since divorced. He remarried Renea Sutch in 1996. He has a son Justin and a daughter Tayler.
