= Rich Dixon =

American football player (born 1968)

No. 51, 55
- Position: Linebacker

Personal information
- Born: August 6, 1959 (age 67); Roswell, New Mexico, U.S.
- Listed height: 6 ft 2 in (1.88 m)
- Listed weight: 235 lb (107 kg)

Career information
- High school: Mt. Eden (Hayward, California)
- College: California (1978–1982)
- NFL draft: 1983: undrafted

Career history
- Atlanta Falcons (1983); Oakland Invaders (1985); San Francisco 49ers (1986)*
- * Offseason or practice squad member only

Awards and highlights
- Third-team All-American (1980); First-team All-Pac-10 (1980); Second-team All-Pac-10 (1979)
- Stats at Pro Football Reference

Richard Marvin Dixon (born August 6, 1959) is an American former professional football linebacker who played for the Atlanta Falcons of the National Football League (NFL). He played college football for the California Golden Bears.

== Early life ==
Richard Marvin Dixon was born on August 6, 1959, in Roswell, New Mexico. He attended Mt. Eden High School in Hayward, California.

== College career ==
Dixon enrolled at the University of California, Berkeley to play college football for the Golden Bears. He was a letterman in 1978, 1979, 1980, and 1982. He was named second-team All-Pac-10 in 1979 and first-team All-Pac-10 in 1980 as a linebacker. Dixon earned Associated Press third-team All-American honors at defensive end in 1980. He missed the 1981 season due to a knee injury. New head coach Joe Kapp moved Dixon to a backup role for the 1982 season. He recorded two career interceptions for 101 yards and one touchdown.

== Professional career ==
After going undrafted in the 1983 NFL draft, Dixon signed with the Atlanta Falcons on May 2. The Baltimore Colts, Dallas Cowboys, Denver Broncos, and Kansas City Chiefs also showed interest. He was released on August 28 and re-signed on September 15. Dixon played in 14 games during the 1983 season as a reserve linebacker. He was released on August 27, 1984, after the final preseason game.

On December 14, 1984, Dixon signed with the Oakland Invaders, who had selected him in the 1983 USFL territorial draft. He played for the Invaders during the 1985 USFL season and recovered three fumbles. The USFL folded after the season.

Dixon was signed by the San Francisco 49ers on June 17, 1986. He was released August 25, 1986, after the third of four preseason games.
