= Bill Bates =

American football player and coach (born 1961)

No. 40
- Position: Safety

Personal information
- Born: June 6, 1961 (age 65); Knoxville, Tennessee, U.S.
- Listed height: 6 ft 1 in (1.85 m)
- Listed weight: 204 lb (93 kg)

Career information
- High school: Farragut (Knoxville)
- College: Tennessee
- NFL draft: 1983: undrafted

Career history

Playing
- Dallas Cowboys (1983–1997)

Coaching
- Dallas Cowboys (1998-2002); Jacksonville Jaguars (2003); Nease High School (2005–2007); Ponte Vedra High School (2009–2012)

Awards and highlights
- 3× Super Bowl champion (XXVII, XXVIII, XXX); Pro Bowl (1984); PFWA All-Rookie Team (1983); 2× Second-team All-SEC (1981, 1982)

Career NFL statistics
- Games played: 217
- Tackles: 676
- Sacks: 18
- Interceptions: 14
- Stats at Pro Football Reference

William Frederick Bates (born June 6, 1961) is an American former professional football player who spent his entire 15-year career as a safety for the Dallas Cowboys of the National Football League (NFL). A fan favorite, he was a Pro Bowl selection in 1984, played in Super Bowl XXVIII and Super Bowl XXX, and was on the Cowboys' roster for Super Bowl XXVII. He played college football for the Tennessee Volunteers.

== Early life ==
Bates attended Farragut High School in Farragut, Tennessee, where he played under rising head coach Ken Sparks. He recorded over 1,000 return yards, 14 interceptions, and nearly 200 tackles during his high school career where he was known for his hard hitting tackles.

He helped lead the Admirals to the state semi-finals in 1978, in which the Admirals lost to Red Bank by one point. He was all-state in football and basketball his senior year. He also practiced track and field. He was considered the 4th best high school recruit in the state in football.

== College career ==
Bates played college football at the University of Tennessee from 1979 through the 1982 season, where he was a four-year starter, the first two at free safety and the last two at strong safety. As a freshman in 1979, he registered 55 tackles (35 solo), 3 sacks, an interception, and 2 fumble recoveries. In 1980, he had 43 tackles (24 solo), including 3 tackles for a loss, to go along with an interception and 2 fumble recoveries. In 1981, he tallied 71 tackles (48 solo) and a team-leading 4 interceptions. During his senior year in 1982, he registered 86 tackles (61 solo), including 2 tackles for a loss, and 3 interceptions.

On October 20, 1979, Bates recorded 8 tackles, a sack, and 2 fumble recoveries against Alabama, who were ranked number one and would go on to win the national championship that year. At the end of 1979 he was honored by being named to the Freshman All-American team. He also won the team's "hardest hitter" award on several occasions throughout his career. He was named second-team All-SEC as a junior and senior.

During Tennessee's 16–15 loss to eventual national champion Georgia on September 6, 1980, Georgia running back Herschel Walker and Bates met on the 5-yard line in a play that still lives in many college football highlights. Walker ran over Bates to score the first touchdown of his college career. The two would later become teammates for several seasons with the Dallas Cowboys.

In 2021, he was inducted into the Tennessee Sports Hall of Fame.

== Professional career ==
Bates went undrafted in the 1983 NFL draft after he ran the 40-yard dash in a disappointing 4.8 seconds during the NFL Scouting Combine. He was selected by the New Jersey Generals in the 1983 USFL Territorial Draft, but he decided to sign as an undrafted free agent with the Dallas Cowboys, which had been his favorite team growing up. He was a long shot to make the team but he earned a roster spot. From the start he excelled on special teams, being named NFL special teams player of the year and to the NFL All-rookie team. He started in the regular-season against the Seattle Seahawks in the playoffs against the Los Angeles Rams at strong safety, replacing an injured Dextor Clinkscale. He also played as a linebacker in the Cowboys' "4–0" pass defense, posting 84 tackles (seventh on the team), one interception, 4 passes defensed, 4 sacks, one forced fumble and 2 fumble recoveries.

In 1984, he missed 4 games after being placed on the injured reserve list, because of a preseason injury suffered against the Green Bay Packers. He was named the team's special teams captain. He started against the Indianapolis Colts at strong safety, making a team-high 7 tackles, one sack, one interception, one pass defensed and one fumble recovery. He started against the Washington Redskins at outside linebacker. He led the team with 10 defensive tackles in the season finale against the Miami Dolphins. He played as a linebacker in the team's "4–0" pass defense. He posted 52 defensive tackles, one interception and one fumble recovery. He set a club record for defensive backs with 5 sacks. He was selected to the Pro Bowl in just his second year, after influencing the NFL to create a first-time roster spot for special teams players that were non-returners, making Bates the first such player to receive that honor. He was named All-Pro and NFL special teams player of the year.

In 1985, he was used as a punt returner out of necessity, registering 22 returns for 152 yards (6.9-yard avg.). He also had 51 defensive tackles, 4 interceptions and one sack. He started 2 games at strong safety.

In 1986, he became a starter at strong safety and remained there until 1988, after which he was used only in the Nickel defense packages. At the end of the 1989 season, Jimmy Johnson informed Bates that he was going to be left unprotected on the team's Plan B free agency list. Although the Minnesota Vikings were interested in him, just before the deadline, the Cowboys decided to protect him.

In 1989, he was the leader in special teams tackles with 19. The next year, he led the team again with 23 tackles, becoming the first player in franchise history to do it in consecutive years.

Bates received the team's Bob Lilly Award four consecutive seasons from 1990 to 1994. This award is selected by a vote of the fans and annually goes to the Cowboy player who displays leadership and character on and off the field. In 1992, he suffered a season-ending knee injury. After the 1993 season, he was selected by his teammates to receive the Ed Block Courage Award for successfully overcoming his injury and leading the team in special teams tackles (25).

Upon his retirement after the 1997 season, he was considered one of the most beloved Cowboys of all time. Over his 15-year career, he had 14 interceptions and 122 return yards.

Bates earned three Super Bowl rings with the Cowboys, playing in Super Bowl XXVIII and Super Bowl XXX. He was on injured reserve during the 1992 season, when the Cowboys played in Super Bowl XXVII, due to a knee injury.

Tom Landry once said, “If we had 11 players on the field who played as hard as Bill Bates does and did their homework like he does, we’d be almost impossible to beat”. He described Bates (Real Kill) and Cliff Harris (Captain Crash) as "the hardest hitters I ever saw." Referring to Bates's reputation as a hard hitter, John Madden stated, "Every game starts with a kick. With Bill Bates on the field, every game begins with a bang!"

== Personal life ==
After his retirement as a player following the 1997 season, Bill was an assistant coach for the Cowboys for five years under head coaches Chan Gailey and Dave Campo. In 2003, Bill spent a year as special teams coach under head coach and former Cowboy linebacker Jack Del Rio. Beginning in 2004, he coached football at his sons' high schools, Nease High School and Ponte Vedra High School in Ponte Vedra Beach, FL.

In 2005, Bates was inducted into the Greater Knoxville Sports Hall of Fame. He was also named to the 100 Year All Tennessee Team. In 2011, Bates was awarded the Tom Landry Legend Award.

== Autobiography ==
- Shoot for the Star (1994), co-authored with Bill Butterworth. ISBN 978-0849911705
