= List of UC Riverside Highlanders in the NFL draft =

This is a list of UC Riverside Highlanders football players in the NFL draft.

== Key ==
B	Back	K	Kicker	NT	Nose tackle
C	Center	LB	Linebacker	FB	Fullback
DB	Defensive back	P	Punter	HB	Halfback
DE	Defensive end	QB	Quarterback	WR	Wide receiver
DT	Defensive tackle	RB	Running back	G	Guard
E	End	T	Offensive tackle	TE	Tight end

== Selections ==
Year	Round	Pick	Overall	Player	Team	Position
1974	4	24	102	Frank Johnson	Los Angeles Rams	T
1974	9	13	221	Derek Williams	Los Angeles Rams	DB
1976	3	8	68	Russ Bolinger	Detroit Lions	T
1976	3	27	87	Butch Johnson	Dallas Cowboys	WR
1978	1	24	24	Dan Bunz	San Francisco 49ers	LB
1979	4	28	110	Calvin Sweeney	Pittsburgh Steelers	WR
