= Bryan Caldwell =

American football player (1960–2015)

No. 79
- Position: Defensive end

Personal information
- Born: May 6, 1960; Oakland, California, U.S.
- Died: January 3, 2015 (aged 54); Bay City, Texas, U.S.
- Listed height: 6 ft 4 in (1.93 m)
- Listed weight: 248 lb (112 kg)

Career information
- High school: Fountain Valley (Fountain Valley, California)
- College: Arizona State
- NFL draft: 1983: 3rd round, 77th overall pick

Career history
- Dallas Cowboys (1983); Houston Oilers (1984); Philadelphia Eagles (1985)*; Arizona Outlaws (1986)*
- * Offseason or practice squad member only

Awards and highlights
- Second-team All-Pac-10 (1982)

Career NFL statistics
- Games played: 8
- Stats at Pro Football Reference

Bryan Craig Caldwell (May 6, 1960 – January 3, 2015) was an American professional football defensive end in the National Football League (NFL) for the Dallas Cowboys and Houston Oilers. He played college football at Arizona State University.

== Early life ==
Caldwell attended Fountain Valley High School, where he was a two-way lineman and set a school record with 20 sacks in 2 years.

He was considered one of the nation's top defensive recruits and received All-county honors. He also practiced track and volleyball.

== College career ==
Caldwell accepted a football scholarship from Arizona State University. As a sophomore in 1979, he was named the starter at left defensive end. In October, he received heavy criticism after publicly confirming to athletic director Fred Miller, that head football coach Frank Kush punched punter Kevin Rutledge.

As a junior in 1980, he was moved to right defensive end. He registered 111 total tackles (fourth on the team) and 5 fumble recoveries (school record). He also blocked a punt and returned it for a 46-yard touchdown against Ohio State University.

In 1981, he missed the spring semester while attending Mesa Community College to regain his academic eligibility. He returned to the team in August, but was ruled academically ineligible to play football for the season. Jim Jeffcoat was moved from nose tackle to right defensive end to replace him.

As a senior in 1982, he returned to play and was named the starter at left defensive end over Walt Bowyer. He was a part of the number one ranked defense in the nation, known as the Cactus Crunch. He played alongside Jeffcoat, Vernon Maxwell and Mike Richardson. He finished the year tied with Maxwell for the team lead in tackles-for-loss (8), fourth on the team in total tackles (114) and returned an interception for a 20-yard touchdown against Kansas State University.

== Professional career ==
=== Dallas Cowboys ===
Caldwell was selected by the Dallas Cowboys in the third round (77th overall) of the 1983 NFL draft. He was also selected by the Arizona Wranglers in the 1983 USFL Territorial Draft. He suffered torn knee ligaments in his left knee during the first week of training camp and was placed on the injured reserve list. He didn't regain his previous form and was released on August 27, 1984.

=== Houston Oilers ===
On September 20, 1984, he was signed as a free agent by the Houston Oilers to replace an injured Jerome Foster. He played in 8 games at defensive end, before being waived during the season.

=== Philadelphia Eagles ===
On May 8, 1985, he signed with the Philadelphia Eagles as a free agent and was waived on August 27.

=== Arizona Outlaws ===
On January 6, 1986, he signed a one-year contract with the Arizona Outlaws of the United States Football League.

== Personal life ==
Caldwell worked as an inspector for the city of Scottsdale, Arizona. His son, Kyle Caldwell, played defensive end for Arizona State from 2003 to 2006. He died of cancer in 2015.
