= 1983 Sugar Bowl =

- 49th Sugar Bowl; National championship game
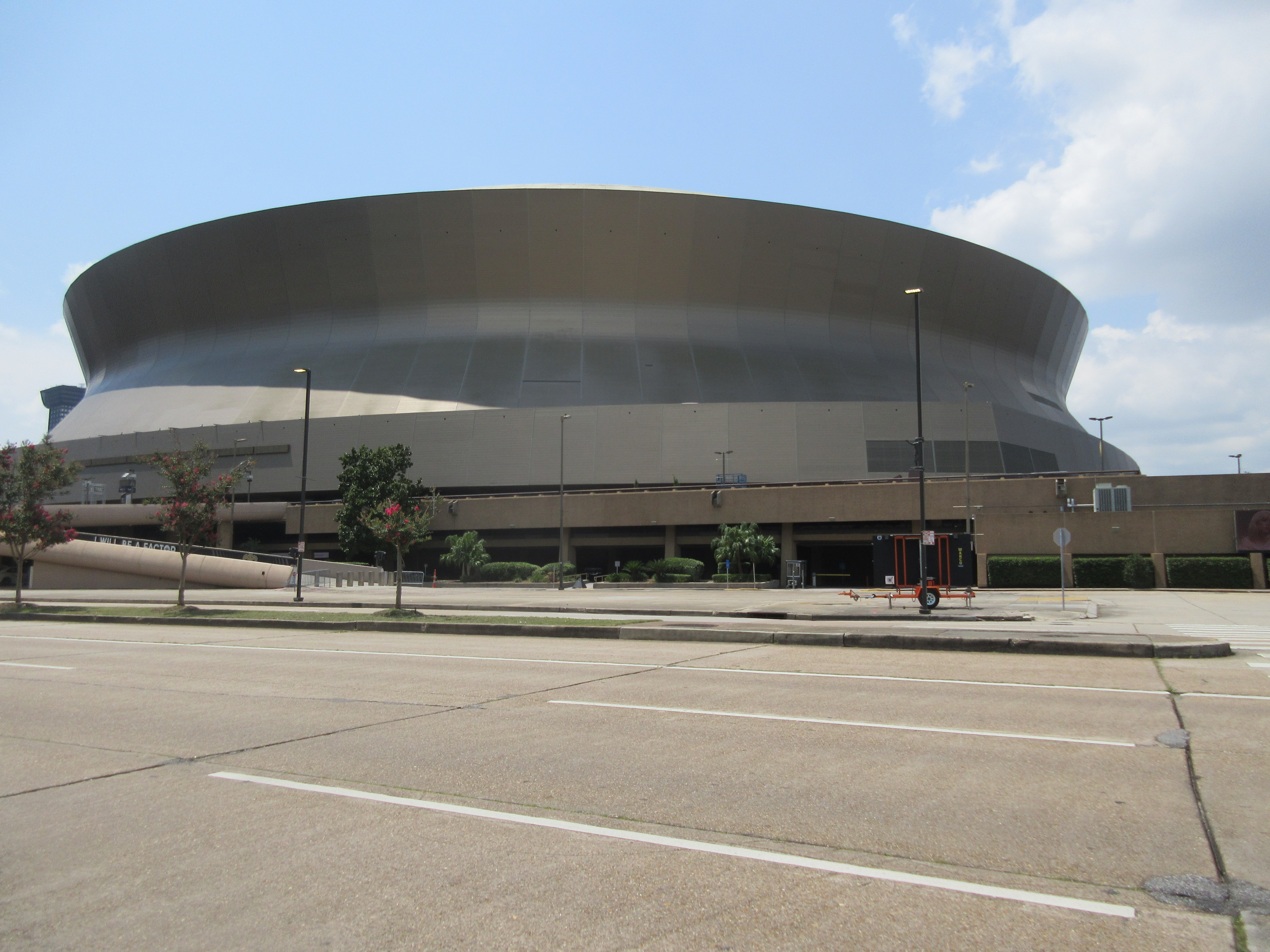
- The Louisiana Superdome in New Orleans, Louisiana, hosted the Sugar Bowl.
Penn State Nittany Lions	Georgia Bulldogs
(10–1)	(11–0)
Independent	SEC
27	23
Head coach: Joe Paterno	Head coach: Vince Dooley
AP / Coaches; 2 / 2	AP / Coaches; 1 / 1
	1	2	3	4	Total
Penn State	7	13	0	7	27
Georgia	3	7	7	6	23
- Date: January 1, 1983
- Season: 1982
- Stadium: Louisiana Superdome
- Location: New Orleans, Louisiana
- MVP: Todd Blackledge (Penn State QB)
- Favorite: Penn State by 4 points
- Referee: Vance Carlson (Big Eight)
- Attendance: 78,127

United States TV coverage
- Network: ABC
- Announcers: Keith Jackson and Frank Broyles

The 1983 Sugar Bowl was the 49th edition of the college football bowl game, played at the Louisiana Superdome in New Orleans, Louisiana, on Saturday, January 1. Part of the 1982–83 bowl game season, it was a de facto national championship game that matched the undefeated and top-ranked Georgia Bulldogs of the Southeastern Conference (SEC) and the #2 Penn State Nittany Lions, an independent. Penn State won 27–23 to finish atop the final polls as national champions for the first time in school history.

== Game summary ==
The game kicked off shortly after 7 p.m. CST, televised by ABC, at the same time as the Orange Bowl on NBC.

Both teams scored on their first possession of the game. Penn State running back Curt Warner scored on a 2-yard touchdown run and the Nittany Lions led 7–0. He finished the game with 117 yards rushing. Georgia got on the board following a 27-yard field goal from Kevin Butler to make it 7–3.

In the second quarter, after two possessions for each team had ended in punts, Nick Gancitano kicked a 38-yard field goal to put the Nittany Lions ahead, 10–3.

After a 65-yard punt return by Kevin Baugh only resulted in a missed field goal for Penn State, Warner added a 9-yard touchdown run on a 65-yard drive that took just under two minutes. With only 44 seconds left in the first half, Gancitano made a 45-yard field goal for Penn State to take a commanding 20–3 lead.

After the ensuing kick-off, however, quarterback John Lastinger drove the Bulldogs down the field, completing four of five passes, including one that Kevin Harris lateralled to Herschel Walker for a 26-yard gain. With five seconds remaining in the half, Lastinger threw a 10-yard touchdown pass to Herman Archie to cut the margin to 20–10 at halftime.

Opening the second half, Georgia mounted a 64-yard drive, which was capped when Herschel Walker scored on a 1-yard touchdown run, cutting the margin to 20–17. Georgia had thus scored touchdowns on consecutive possessions (one to end the first half and one to open the second), with Penn State only touching the ball intermittently to run out the clock in the first half. However, the Bulldogs wouldn't score again for almost 22 minutes of game time and John Lastinger went on to throw two interceptions.

Penn State cashed in on the second one with a 47-yard play-action touchdown pass from Todd Blackledge to wide receiver Gregg Garrity to give Penn State a 27–17 lead. Lastinger threw a 9-yard touchdown pass to Clarence Kay to close the margin to 27–23 with 3:54 left. After the subsequent kick-off, however, Penn State was able to run out the clock, only having to punt as time was expiring.

=== Scoring summary ===
PSU: Curt Warner 2-yard run (Nick Gancitano kick), 12:09 (1st)
UGA: Kevin Butler 27-yard field goal, 6:05 (1st)
PSU: Nick Gancitano 38-yard field goal, 11:47 (2nd)
PSU: Warner 9-yard run (Gancitano kick), 2:43 (2nd)
PSU: Gancitano 45-yard field goal, 0:44 (2nd)
UGA: Herman Archie 10-yard pass from John Lastinger (Butler kick), 0:05 (2nd)
UGA: Walker 1-yard run (Butler kick), 10:37 (3rd)
PSU: Gregg Garrity 47-yard pass from Todd Blackledge (Gancitano kick), 13:16 (4th)
UGA: Clarence Kay 9-yard pass from Lastinger (Run failed), 3:54 (4th)

=== Statistics ===
	1	2	3	4	Total
No. 2 Nittany Lions	7	13	0	7	27
No. 1 Bulldogs	3	7	7	6	23

Statistics	PSU	UGA
First downs	19	19
Plays–yards	67–367	74–326
Rushes–yards	44–139	46–160
Passing yards	228	166
Passing: comp–att–int	13–23–0	12–28–2
Turnovers		
Time of possession	30:38	29:22

Team	Category	Player	Statistics
Penn State	Passing		
Penn State	Rushing		
Penn State	Receiving		
Georgia	Passing		
Georgia	Rushing		
Georgia	Receiving		
