= The Stan and Guy Show =

"The Stan and Guy Show" was a Pittsburgh-based talk show on ESPN Radio 1250, which aired from 2008 to 2010. It was hosted by Stan Savran and Guy Junker. The show replaced "The Junker and Crow Show" on ESPN Radio 1250's lineup, airing grom 10 AM until 2 PM. Frequent topics on the program included the Pittsburgh Pirates, Pittsburgh Steelers, and Pittsburgh Penguins.

Once a month the show broadcast from Morton's The Steakhouse in downtown Pittsburgh with a "Lunch With the Legends" theme. Guests included Bill Mazeroski, Franco Harris, Jack Ham, Steve Blass, Pierre LaRouche, Steve Levy, Barry Melrose and Mike ((Greenburg)) and Mike ((Golic)). The show also featured a "Sportsbeat" hour from Noon to 1 PM on Thursdays that replicated the television show Stan and Guy did for Fox Sports Net from 1991 to 2003.

In June the duo held their first annual "Stan and Guy Golf Classic" at Churchill Valley Country Club with proceeds going to the V Foundation.

Stan Savran also does Pittsburgh Pirates and Penguins pregame shows for FSN and Guy Junker is the sports director of WTAE-TV (ABC) in Pittsburgh.

In October 2006, the show became available via ESPN Podcast.

On September 24, 2010, ESPN Radio 1250 announced that they would be switching to Radio Disney and would cease carrying local personalities on their station. The show was cancelled.
