= Todd Blackledge =

American football player (born 1961)

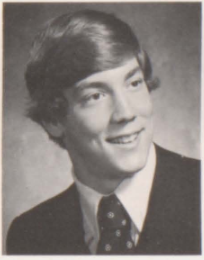
- Blackledge's senior portrait c. 1978-1979

No. 14
- Position: Quarterback

Personal information
- Born: February 25, 1961 (age 65); Canton, Ohio, U.S.
- Listed height: 6 ft 3 in (1.91 m)
- Listed weight: 225 lb (102 kg)

Career information
- High school: Hoover (North Canton, Ohio)
- College: Penn State (1979–1982)
- NFL draft: 1983: 1st round, 7th overall pick

Career history
- Kansas City Chiefs (1983–1987); Pittsburgh Steelers (1988–1989)

Awards and highlights
- National champion (1982); Davey O'Brien Award (1982); First-team All-East (1982)

Career NFL statistics
- Passing attempts: 881
- Passing completions: 424
- Completion percentage: 48.1%
- TD–INT: 29–38
- Passing yards: 5,286
- Passer rating: 60.2
- Stats at Pro Football Reference

Todd Alan Blackledge (born February 25, 1961) is an American former professional football player who was a quarterback in the National Football League (NFL). He played college football for the Penn State Nittany Lions, leading them to a national championship. He was selected by the Kansas City Chiefs with the seventh pick in the 1983 NFL draft and also played for the Pittsburgh Steelers. Blackledge is a college football television broadcaster, working for ABC Sports from 1994 through 1998, for CBS Sports from 1999 to 2005, ESPN from 2006 through January 2023, and NBC since February 2023.

== Early life ==
Blackledge's family moved to Princeton, New Jersey, where his father worked as offensive coordinator for the Princeton Tigers football team and Blackledge attended Princeton High School from 1975 to 1976. He returned to the Canton area to finish his high school career at North Canton Hoover High School in North Canton, Ohio, from which he graduated in 1979.

== College career ==
Blackledge was a three-year starter at Penn State, under Coach Joe Paterno, where he guided the Nittany Lions to a 31–5 record including a national championship in 1982.

Following the 1982 season, Blackledge won the Davey O'Brien Award for best quarterback in the nation. As a senior, Blackledge threw for 2,218 yards with 22 touchdowns and 14 interceptions, while also rushing for three touchdowns.

Blackledge led the Nittany Lions to the national championship with a 27–23 victory over Herschel Walker-led Georgia Bulldogs in the 1983 Sugar Bowl. Blackledge was the MVP of the game, throwing for 228 yards and a 4th-quarter 47-yard touchdown to Gregg Garrity.

== Professional career ==
Blackledge was the seventh pick and second quarterback selected in the first round of the 1983 NFL draft, chosen by the Kansas City Chiefs. He was picked behind John Elway (#1, Baltimore) but ahead of Dan Marino (#27, Miami), astounding both Marino (who believed that he was better than Blackledge) and Blackledge himself (who had expected to be picked in the middle of the round). He was also drafted ahead of Hall of Famer Jim Kelly (#14 Buffalo), as well as Tony Eason (#15, New England) and Ken O'Brien (#22, New York Jets). He was the last quarterback drafted in the first round by the Chiefs until Patrick Mahomes three decades later.

Blackledge was a Chief for five seasons (1983–1987) before ending his career with the Pittsburgh Steelers (1988–1989). He served mainly as a back-up to Bill Kenney in Kansas City starting only 24 of 40 possible games and completing just 49% of his passes for 4,510 yards, 26 touchdowns and 32 interceptions.

Blackledge was the backup to Bubby Brister in Pittsburgh his final two seasons, going 2–3 in games started due to Brister's injury.

== Broadcasting career ==
Blackledge went on to host radio sports talk shows in Cleveland (WKNR) and Canton, Ohio (WHBC). He also did analyst work for the Big East Network, Indianapolis Colts preseason games, and ESPN.

From 1994 to 1998, he worked as a college football analyst for ABC Sports. In 1999, Blackledge joined CBS Sports as the lead analyst for the network's college football coverage. On September 10, 2000, he called the Oakland Raiders and Indianapolis Colts game with Greg Gumbel as he filled in for Phil Simms who underwent an emergency appendectomy. In 2006, he began serving on the first team alongside Mike Patrick for ESPN College Football Saturday Primetime on ESPN. As part of his duties he is featured on "Todd's Taste of the Town", a segment where he visits a local restaurant and samples its fare. Blackledge has facetiously stated this is the most difficult part of his broadcasting experience.

Blackledge was teamed with Brad Nessler and sideline reporter Erin Andrews for the 2009 season, while Patrick was teamed with Craig James and sideline reporter Heather Cox.

In the late 2010s, Blackledge was paired with Sean McDonough, who returned to calling games at the college level after spending two seasons with Monday Night Football, and Holly Rowe, whom he had teamed with over the previous three years. Todd McShay joined their crew for the 2020 and 2021 seasons, with Molly McGrath joining for the latter season, and eventually replacing McShay for the 2022 season.

For the 2023 season, NBC Sports signed Blackledge as the color analyst on the new Big Ten Saturday Night package, partnering with Noah Eagle. The duo was also the #2 broadcast team for NBC's NFL broadcasts, calling the Week 16 Bengals-Steelers game and the Browns-Texans Wild Card game on NBC in 2023, and the Week 1 Packers-Eagles game in São Paulo, Brazil on Peacock in 2024.

== Coaching career ==
In April 2014, Blackledge was hired as the head varsity basketball coach at Hoover High School in North Canton, Ohio.

== Personal life ==
Blackledge is the son of Ron, a former NFL assistant coach.

Blackledge earned a Bachelor of Arts in speech communication from Penn State in 1983, graduating Phi Beta Kappa with a 3.8 grade point average. Named a first-team Academic All-American, he was also awarded the Eric Walker Award, given to the Penn State senior student who has most "enhanced the esteem and recognition of the University." Blackledge was inducted into the Academic All-America Hall of Fame in 1997. He sits on the Board of Visitors for Penn State's Center for Sports Journalism.

Blackledge was selected to receive the prestigious 2008 NCAA Silver Anniversary Award, recognizing former student-athletes who excelled both in their collegiate and professional careers. On June 5, 2009, Blackledge received Penn State's prestigious Distinguished Alumni Award.
