= Todd Seabaugh =

American football player (born 1961)

No. 59
- Position: Linebacker

Personal information
- Born: March 16, 1961 (age 65); Encino, California, U.S.
- Listed height: 6 ft 4 in (1.93 m)
- Listed weight: 225 lb (102 kg)

Career information
- High school: Santa Paula (Santa Paula, California)
- College: San Diego State
- NFL draft: 1983: 3rd round, 79th overall pick

Career history
- Pittsburgh Steelers (1984); Houston Oilers (1985)*
- * Offseason or practice squad member only

Career NFL statistics
- Games played: 16
- Stats at Pro Football Reference

Raymond Todd Seabaugh (born March 1, 1961) is an American former professional football player who was a linebacker who played professionally in the National Football League (NFL).

Seabaugh was selected 79th overall in the third round of the 1983 NFL draft by the Pittsburgh Steelers out of San Diego State University. Seabaugh is best remembered for wearing Jack Ham's number 59.
