= Stan Savran =

American sportscaster (1947–2023)

- Born: Stanley George Savransky; February 25, 1947; Cleveland, Ohio, U.S.
- Died: June 12, 2023 (aged 76); Pittsburgh, Pennsylvania, U.S.
- Education: Miami University
- Occupation: Sportscaster
- Years active: 1970s–2023

Stan Savran (born Stanley George Savransky; February 25, 1947 – June 12, 2023) was an American media personality based in Pittsburgh, Pennsylvania. He was a member of the Western Pennsylvania Sports Hall of Fame and a member of the Pittsburgh Pirates Media Wall of Fame.

== Work ==
Savran was best known for his time on Fox Sports Net Pittsburgh, where he co-hosted a talk show with Guy Junker, "Stan Savran and Guy Junker on Sportsbeat." His Twitter handle (@StanLoveTheShow) was based on the greeting given to him during his time hosting Sportsbeat, "Stan, Guy, love the show."

Savran worked for Fox Sports Pittsburgh from 1991, when it was known as KBL. For 17 years, he was the host/co-host of Savran on Sportsbeat, shown weeknights from 6:30–7:30 pm on Fox Sports Pittsburgh. Sportsbeat was the longest-running sports show in Pittsburgh television history.

It was announced on July 7, 2009, via Bob Smizik's online blog on postgazette.com, that Savran on Sportsbeat was canceled by FSN Pittsburgh, and Stan Savran's future with the station was up in the air. However, it was announced on July 11, 2009, that Stan Savran agreed to a new contract with FSN. As a result, Savran would be the primary host for Penguins and Pirates pregame shows and also would continue to be the host of the Mike Tomlin Press Conference and The Mike Tomlin Show. A special 2-hour series finale of Sportsbeat aired on July 13, 2009.

Savran on Sportsbeat was considered a lifeline to Pittsburgh natives who had scattered throughout the country : a way to touch base and get the news and opinions regarding Pittsburgh sports. The show had a regular run of guests, including Mr. Monday Night, former Steelers tackle Tunch Ilkin, Steelers defensive back Ike Taylor, Pittsburgh Penguins forward Max Talbot, and fantasy football expert Duane Cahill.

From 2001 to 2006, Savran was heard from 3–6 pm weekdays on Fox Sports Radio 970, WBGG (AM). His radio show was canceled on July 7, 2006, due to a station format change.

On August 4, 2008, Savran teamed up once again with Junker for a new show. The Stan And Guy Show was aired on ESPN Radio 1250AM WEAE, in the 10:00 am – 2:00 pm time slot until 2010.

On September 24, 2010, ESPN Radio 1250 announced that it would be switching to Radio Disney and would cease carrying local personalities on its station. However, as of October 2010, Savran was back on 970 AM as part of the station switching to ESPN Radio. His show, Savran on Sports, could be heard in the 12:00 – 2:00 pm time slot.

== Career history ==
Savran worked at several radio jobs after graduating from Miami University in Oxford, Ohio. His stops included Columbus, Lawton, OK, and Orlando, FL, where he called play-by-play in the World Football League in 1974–75. Savran came to Pittsburgh in January 1976 by responding to a "blind" ad for a radio sportscaster in the classified section of Broadcasting magazine.

His first on-air job in Pittsburgh was at WWSW-AM. When WWSW changed formats in 1979, he moved to KQV.

On September 20, 1981, Savran filled in for Jack Fleming on the Pittsburgh Steelers Radio Network with Myron Cope, in a game between the Pittsburgh Steelers and the New York Jets at Three Rivers Stadium in Pittsburgh, calling most of the game except for Steelers quarterback Terry Bradshaw's touchdown-scoring third quarter drive, which Joe Tucker called. The Steelers won the game, 38–10.

From 1981 to 1991, he was an everyday sports reporter, both from the news desk and on location, for WTAE-TV. He also hosted an 8-9 pm talk show on WTAE Radio, now WPGP. Savran earned such praise for his patience, knowledge, and style that a local newspaper columnist retrospectively referred to the pairing of that show and Myron Cope's show in the 6-8 pm timeslot as "the Golden Era of Pittsburgh sports talk." Savran left for KBL/Fox Sports Net after a dispute with management.

From 2000 to 2004, he wrote weekly sports columns for the Pittsburgh Post-Gazette, the largest newspaper in Pittsburgh.

Savran was a sports anchor for WTAE-TV and WPGH-TV, both in Pittsburgh. He also hosted intermission segments on Pittsburgh Penguins broadcasts when the games were on WPGH and continued to do so occasionally for AT&T SportsNet Pittsburgh.

== Illness and death ==
Savran had numerous health issues and disclosed in 2022 that he was battling lung cancer. On April 19, 2023, he revealed that he had his right foot amputated. On June 12, 2023, Savran died at the age of 76.

== Awards and honors ==
- Emcee, Blair County Sports Hall of Fame (1987–2022)
- Member of the Western Pennsylvania Sports Hall of Fame (2003)
- Member of the Pittsburgh Pirates Media Wall of Fame (2018)
