= Bill Contz =

American football player (born 1961)

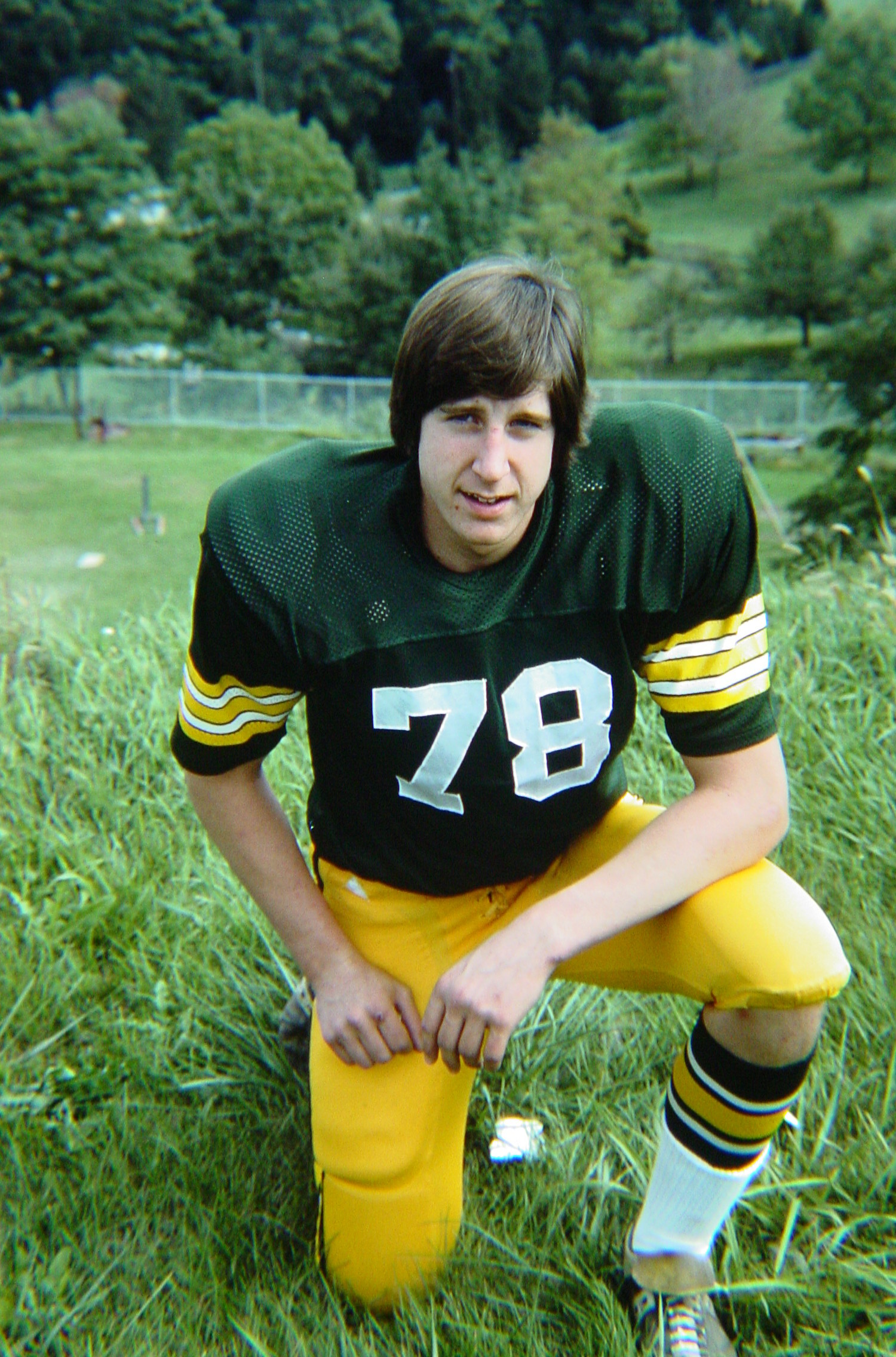

No. 75, 70
- Position: Offensive tackle

Personal information
- Born: May 12, 1961 (age 65); Belle Vernon, Pennsylvania, U.S.
- Listed height: 6 ft 5 in (1.96 m)
- Listed weight: 268 lb (122 kg)

Career information
- High school: Belle Vernon Area
- College: Penn State (1979–1982)
- NFL draft: 1983: 5th round, 122nd overall pick

Career history
- Cleveland Browns (1983–1986); New Orleans Saints (1986–1988); Denver Broncos (1989)*; Indianapolis Colts (1989)*
- * Offseason or practice squad member only

Awards and highlights
- National champion (1982); Second-team All-East (1982)

Career NFL statistics
- Games played: 63
- Games started: 25
- Fumble recoveries: 2
- Stats at Pro Football Reference

Julius William Contz (born May 12, 1961) is an American former professional football player who was an offensive tackle for six seasons in the National Football League (NFL) with the Cleveland Browns and New Orleans Saints. He was selected by the Browns in the fifth round of the 1983 NFL draft after playing college football for the Penn State Nittany Lions.

== Early life ==
Julius William Contz was born on May 12, 1961, in Belle Vernon, Pennsylvania. He played football and basketball at Belle Vernon Area High School in Belle Vernon. He was a two way tackle on the football team and helped them win their first conference title. He also helped the basketball team win their first WPIAL title. Contz averaged 17.4 points per game in basketball his senior year in 1978–79.

== College career ==
Contz was a member of the Nittany Lions at Pennsylvania State University from 1979 to 1982 and a three-year letterman from 1980 to 1982. He became a starter in 1981 and was a starter on the school's first ever national championship team in 1982. He earned Associated Press second-team All-East honors that season.

== Professional career ==
Contz was selected by the Cleveland Browns in the fifth round, with the 122nd overall pick, of the 1983 NFL draft. He officially signed with the team on May 31. He played in all 16 games for the Browns during his rookie year in 1983. He appeared in 15 games, starting nine, for the team in 1984 before being placed on injured reserve on December 12, 1984. The next year, Contz was placed on the physically unable to perform list on August 20, 1985. He was later activated on October 19 and played in four games during the 1985 season. He played in one game for the Browns in 1986 before being released on September 10, 1986.

Contz signed with the New Orleans Saints on September 23, 1986. He proceeded to start the next 13 games for the Saints that year, recovering two fumbles. The Saints finished the 1986 season with a 7–9 record. He only appeared in three games for the team during the 1987 season. He played in 11 games, starting two, in 1988. Contz spent the month of November 1988 on injured reserve. He became a free agent after the 1988 season.

Contz was signed by the Denver Broncos on March 29, 1989. On August 21, 1989, he was traded to the Indianapolis Colts for a 1990 conditional eleventh round draft pick. He was released by the Colts on August 30, 1989.

== Personal life ==
After his NFL career, Contz worked for Federated Investors and then worked in medical device sales. His book "When the Lions Roared: Joe Paterno and One of College Football's Greatest Teams" (Triumph Books) was released in September 2017.
