= Chet Winters =

American football player (born 1960)

No. 20
- Position: Running back

Personal information
- Born: October 22, 1960 (age 66); Chicago, Illinois, US
- Listed height: 5 ft 11 in (1.80 m)
- Listed weight: 205 lb (93 kg)

Career information
- High school: Jacksonville (Jacksonville, Arkansas)
- College: Oklahoma (1979–1982)
- NFL draft: 1983: undrafted

Career history
- Pittsburgh Steelers (1983)*; Green Bay Packers (1983–1984); New Jersey Generals (1985)*
- * Offseason or practice squad member only

Career NFL statistics
- Kick returns: 3
- Return yards: 28
- Stats at Pro Football Reference

Chester "Chet" Winters (born October 22, 1960) is an American former professional football player who was a running back in the National Football League (NFL). He played college football for the Oklahoma Sooners and later was a member of the NFL's Pittsburgh Steelers and Green Bay Packers, as well as the New Jersey Generals of the United States Football League (USFL).

== Early life ==
Winters was born on October 22, 1960, in Chicago, Illinois. He attended Jacksonville High School in Arkansas and is one of only six of their alumni ever to make it to the NFL. He was considered one of the best running backs in the state and was selected to Associated Press' Arkansas "Super Team" as a senior in 1978, after having helped Jacksonville win the Class AAAA championship. Winters totaled over 2,000 rushing yards and 36 touchdowns in his time at Jacksonville. He committed to play college football for the Oklahoma Sooners.

== College career ==
As a true freshman at the University of Oklahoma in 1979, Winters was behind Billy Sims in rushing priority and ran 16 times for 123 yards (a 7.7 average) and two touchdowns. After Sims graduated, Winters saw more playing time in the 1980 season, although behind David Overstreet, recording 79 rush attempts for 370 yards and four touchdowns, as Oklahoma won the conference championship with a 10–2 record.

Winters saw limited action in his final two seasons behind Buster Rhymes and then Marcus Dupree, only having 140 rushing yards and no touchdowns in 1981 and just 60 yards with no scores in 1982. Having been behind others in rushing priority for his entire stint at Oklahoma, Winters finished his collegiate career having rushed 144 times for 693 yards (a 4.8 average) with seven touchdowns. He also recorded four catches for 57 yards.

== Professional career ==
After going unselected in the 1983 NFL draft, Winters was signed by the Pittsburgh Steelers as an undrafted free agent. He led the team in rushing in their first preseason game and finished the preseason with 32 carries for 102 yards, but ultimately was released during roster cuts.

Winters tried out for the New York Giants the month after his release and near the end of October had a tryout with the Green Bay Packers. He was signed by the Packers after his tryout as a replacement for Eddie Lee Ivery, who was placed on the reserve list. He made his NFL debut in the Packers' 35–21 win over the Cleveland Browns in week 10 and appeared in three further games in the season. He had his only touches in a week 12 loss to the Detroit Lions, having three kickoff returns for 28 yards. He was released by the Packers in July 1984.

Winters signed with the New Jersey Generals of the United States Football League (USFL) in October 1984; the team had previously selected him in the 1983 USFL Territorial Draft. He did not make the final roster.
