= Henry Odom =

American football player (born 1959)

No. 44, 36
- Position: Running back

Personal information
- Born: February 12, 1959 (age 67); Bamberg, South Carolina, U.S.
- Listed height: 5 ft 10 in (1.78 m)
- Listed weight: 200 lb (91 kg)

Career information
- High school: Denmark (SC) Olar
- College: South Carolina State
- NFL draft: 1983: 8th round, 199th overall pick

Career history
- Pittsburgh Steelers (1983); Orlando Renegades (1985)

Career NFL statistics
- Rushing yards: 7
- Rushing average: 3.5
- Return yards: 756
- Stats at Pro Football Reference

Henry Odom (born February 12, 1959) is an American former professional football player who was a running back in the National Football League (NFL). He played college football for the South Carolina State Bulldogs. Odom played in the NFL for the Pittsburgh Steelers in 1983 and for the Orlando Renegades of the United States Football League in 1985. He was selected by the Pittsburgh Steelers in the eighth round (199th overall) of the 1983 NFL Draft.
