= Ken Kelley (American football) =

American football player (born 1960)

No. 56
- Position: Linebacker

Personal information
- Born: June 20, 1960 (age 66)
- Listed height: 6 ft 2 in (1.88 m)
- Listed weight: 226 lb (103 kg)

Career information
- High school: Somerdale (NJ) Sterling
- College: Penn State
- NFL draft: 1983: undrafted

Career history
- Philadelphia Stars (1983–1984); Chicago Blitz (1984); Birmingham Stallions (1985)

Awards and highlights
- National champion (1982)

Career USFL statistics
- Sacks: 6.5
- Interceptions: 3

Ken Kelley (born June 20, 1960) is an American former football linebacker who played two seasons in the United States Football League (USFL) with the Philadelphia Stars, Chicago Blitz and Birmingham Stallions. He was selected by the Philadelphia Stars in the 1983 USFL Territorial Draft. He played college football at Penn State University and attended Sterling High School in Somerdale, New Jersey.

== Early life ==
Raised in Stratford, New Jersey, Kelley played high school football for the Sterling High School Silver Knights. He was a safety and linebacker for the Silver Knights before converting to quarterback his junior year. The team was 11-0 his senior season and garnered a number one ranking in New Jersey. In his four years playing for the Silver Knights, they won four Colonial Conference titles and reached the first four South Jersey Group 3 championship games, winning three of them. He was inducted into the Camden County Sports Hall of Fame in 2013.

== College career ==
Kelley played college football for the Penn State Nittany Lions. He converted to linebacker for the Lions and was captain of the 1982 national championship team. He redshirted his freshman year.

== Professional career ==
Kelley was selected by the Philadelphia Stars in the 1983 USFL Territorial Draft. He played for the Stars during the 1984 season.

Kelley played for the Chicago Blitz in 1984.

Kelley played for the Birmingham Stallions in 1985.
