= Wayne Capers =

American football player (born 1961)

No. 80, 87
- Position: Wide receiver

Personal information
- Born: May 17, 1961 (age 65); Miami, Florida, U.S.
- Listed height: 6 ft 2 in (1.88 m)
- Listed weight: 198 lb (90 kg)

Career information
- High school: South Miami (Miami, Florida)
- College: Kansas
- NFL draft: 1983: 2nd round, 52nd overall pick

Career history
- Pittsburgh Steelers (1983–1984); Indianapolis Colts (1985–1986); San Francisco 49ers (1987)*
- * Offseason or practice squad member only

Awards and highlights
- First-team All-Big Eight (1981)

Career NFL statistics
- Receptions: 51
- Receiving yards: 822
- Receiving touchdowns: 5
- Stats at Pro Football Reference

Wayne Erwin Capers (born May 17, 1961) is an American former professional football player who was a wide receiver for four seasons for the Pittsburgh Steelers and Indianapolis Colts. Prior to his professional career Capers was an All-Big Eight receiver at the University of Kansas. Caper's wife, the former Robbin Smith, played in 82 games for the Kansas women's basketball team from 1979–80 through 1981–82. Robbin attended Pittsburgh's Schenley High School and majored in: communication studies. Caper's son, Wayne Capers Jr. played in 14 games for the University of Arizona in 2012 and 2013 and transferred to Duquesne University in the spring of 2014.
