= Kenny Jackson =

American football player (born 1962)

No. 81, 84, 86, 83
- Position: Wide receiver

Personal information
- Born: February 15, 1962 (age 64); Neptune, New Jersey, U.S.
- Listed height: 6 ft 0 in (1.83 m)
- Listed weight: 180 lb (82 kg)

Career information
- High school: South River (NJ)
- College: Penn State
- NFL draft: 1984: 1st round, 4th overall pick

Career history
- Philadelphia Eagles (1984–1988); Houston Oilers (1989); Philadelphia Eagles (1990–1991)

Awards and highlights
- National champion (1982); First-team All-American (1982); Second-team All-American (1983); 2× First-team All-East (1982, 1983)

Career NFL statistics
- Receptions: 126
- Receiving yards: 2,170
- Receiving touchdowns: 11
- Stats at Pro Football Reference

Kenneth Jackson (born February 15, 1962) is an American former professional football player. He played wide receiver for eight seasons in the National Football League (NFL) with the Philadelphia Eagles and Houston Oilers and was twice named a college All-American at Penn State University (1982 and 1983).

== Early life ==
Jackson grew up in South River, New Jersey and was a highly recruited athlete out of South River High School, where he excelled in football, basketball, baseball, and track. The school retired his #21 football jersey in October 1994. Jackson was inducted into the New Jersey Sports Writers Association Hall of Fame in 1996.

== Career ==
=== College ===
Jackson was Penn State's first All-American wide receiver. By his senior year in 1983, he held 27 school records. He still ranks second in career receiving yards among Nittany Lions with 2,006. He enjoyed his best season in 1982 when he hauled in 41 passes for 697 yards and seven touchdowns en route to Penn State's first National Championship.

- 1980: 21 catches for 386 yards and 5 touchdowns. 4 carries for -5 yards. 13 punt returns for 80 yards. 1 kick return for 23 yards.
- 1981: 19 catches for 440 yards and 6 touchdowns. 6 carries for 92 yards.
- 1982: 41 catches for 697 yards and 7 touchdowns. 5 carries for 9 yards and 1 touchdown. 1 punt return for 11 yards.
- 1983: 28 catches for 483 yards and 7 touchdowns. 7 carries for 78 yards and 1 touchdown. 7 punt returns for 59 yards. 2 kick returns for 22 yards.

=== Professional career ===
Jackson was the first round pick (#4 overall) of the Philadelphia Eagles in the 1984 NFL draft. He enjoyed an eight-year career in the NFL with the Eagles and Houston Oilers. He finished his professional career with 126 receptions for 2,170 yards and 11 touchdowns.

Jackson announced his retirement after the 1987 season to run Kenny's Korner, a deli in Camden, New Jersey. He re-signed with the Eagles during the 1988 season.

=== Coaching ===
Jackson served on the coaching staff at his alma mater for eight seasons, coaching Penn State's wide receivers from 1993 to 2000. There he helped develop future NFL players Bobby Engram, Freddie Scott, and Joe Jurevicius. He served as an assistant coach with the Pittsburgh Steelers from 2001 to 2003.

=== Broadcasting ===
Jackson is a sideline reporter for the Big Ten Network.

== Personal life ==
Jackson and former NFL running back Blair Thomas are partners in a chain of Harrisburg, Pennsylvania-area sports bars called KoKoMos.

In April 2008, Jackson and seven other former NFL players traveled to the Middle East to visit with troops and coach them in the USO's Operation Gridiron: Huddle with the Troops, a flag football tournament for service personnel serving overseas.
