= Mike McCloskey =

American football player (born 1961)

No. 89, 84
- Position: Tight end

Personal information
- Born: February 2, 1961 (age 65); Philadelphia, Pennsylvania, U.S.
- Listed height: 6 ft 5 in (1.96 m)
- Listed weight: 244 lb (111 kg)

Career information
- High school: Father Judge (Philadelphia)
- College: Penn State
- NFL draft: 1983: 4th round, 88th overall pick

Career history
- Houston Oilers (1983–1985); Los Angeles Raiders (1987)*; Philadelphia Eagles (1987); Indianapolis Colts (1987)
- * Offseason or practice squad member only

Awards and highlights
- National champion (1982); First-team All-East (1982)

Career NFL statistics
- Receptions: 29
- Receiving yards: 318
- Touchdowns: 3
- Stats at Pro Football Reference

Michael James McCloskey (born February 2, 1961) is an American former professional football player who was a tight end in the National Football League (NFL) for the Houston Oilers and Philadelphia Eagles. He played college football for the Penn State Nittany Lions.
