= Harvey Clayton =

American football player (born 1961)

No. 33, 21
- Position: Cornerback

Personal information
- Born: April 4, 1961 (age 65); Kendall, Florida, U.S.

Career information
- College: Florida State
- NFL draft: 1983: undrafted

Career history
- Pittsburgh Steelers (1983–1986); New York Giants (1987)

Career NFL statistics
- Games played - started: 59 - 26
- Sacks: 3
- Interceptions: 5
- Stats at Pro Football Reference

Harvey Jerome Clayton (born April 4, 1961) is an American former professional football player who was a cornerback for five seasons with the Pittsburgh Steelers and New York Giants of the National Football League (NFL). He played college football for the Florida State Seminoles, earning first-team All-South Independent honors (1982).

Clayton is the uncle of former NFL safety Antrel Rolle.
