= Eric Williams (safety) =

American football player (born 1960)

No. 21, 23
- Position: Safety

Personal information
- Born: February 21, 1960 (age 66); Raleigh, North Carolina, U.S.
- Listed height: 6 ft 1 in (1.85 m)
- Listed weight: 188 lb (85 kg)

Career information
- High school: Garner (Garner, North Carolina)
- College: North Carolina State
- NFL draft: 1983: 6th round, 164th overall pick

Career history
- Pittsburgh Steelers (1983–1986); Detroit Lions (1987)

Awards and highlights
- First-team All-ACC (1982)

Career NFL statistics
- Interceptions: 10
- Sacks: 2
- Fumble recoveries: 2
- Stats at Pro Football Reference

Eric Thomas Williams (born February 21, 1960) is an American former professional football player who was a safety in the National Football League (NFL). He played college football for the NC State Wolfpack and was selected by the Pittsburgh Steelers in the sixth round of the 1983 NFL draft.

Williams also played for the Detroit Lions.

He was a 1978 graduate of Garner Magnet High School in Garner, North Carolina, and was inducted into the high school's hall of fame in 2012.
