= Blake Wingle =

American football player (born 1960)

No. 61, 64
- Position: Guard

Personal information
- Born: April 17, 1960; Pottsville, Pennsylvania, U.S.
- Listed height: 6 ft 2 in (1.88 m)
- Listed weight: 268 lb (122 kg)

Career information
- High school: Oxnard (CA) Rio Mesa
- College: UCLA
- NFL draft: 1983: 9th round, 244th overall pick

Career history
- Pittsburgh Steelers (1983–1985); Green Bay Packers (1985); Cleveland Browns (1987)

Career NFL statistics
- Games played: 39
- Games started: 12
- Stats at Pro Football Reference

Blake Leo Wingle (born April 17, 1960) is a former guard in the National Football League (NFL) who played for the Pittsburgh Steelers, Green Bay Packers and the Cleveland Browns. Wingle attended Rio Mesa High. He played collegiate ball for Cal Poly-San Luis Obispo, Ventura Junior College and UCLA before being selected by the Steelers in the 9th round of the 1983 NFL draft. He played professionally for four seasons in the NFL and retired in 1987. He was inducted into the Ventura County Sports Hall Of Fame in 2018.

== Personal life ==
A resident of Bakersfield, California, where Blake and his wife Lisa have three kids: Brent, Emily, Brandon and Aubrey.
