= Gregg Garrity =

American football player (born 1960)

No. 86
- Position: Wide receiver

Personal information
- Born: November 24, 1960 (age 65); Pittsburgh, Pennsylvania, U.S.
- Listed height: 5 ft 10 in (1.78 m)
- Listed weight: 171 lb (78 kg)

Career information
- High school: North Allegheny (Wexford, Pennsylvania)
- College: Penn State
- NFL draft: 1983: 5th round, 140th overall pick

Career history
- Pittsburgh Steelers (1983–1984); Philadelphia Eagles (1984–1989)

Awards and highlights
- National champion (1982)

Career NFL statistics
- Receptions: 82
- Receiving yards: 1,329
- Receiving touchdowns: 6
- Stats at Pro Football Reference

Gregg David Garrity (born November 24, 1960) is an American former professional football player who was a wide receiver in the National Football League (NFL) for the Pittsburgh Steelers and Philadelphia Eagles. He played college football for the Penn State Nittany Lions, and played high school football at North Allegheny High School in Wexford, Pennsylvania. He was selected 140th overall in the fifth round of the 1983 NFL draft.

Garrity is notable for a diving catch in the end zone that helped the Nittany Lions clinch their first national title over Georgia, a feat that landed him on the cover of Sports Illustrated.

Garrity was a Brother in Phi Gamma Delta Fraternity during his time at Penn State.
