= Oyster Bowl =

- Stadium: S.B. Ballard Stadium (1946–1995, 2011–present)
- Location: Norfolk, Virginia
- Previous stadiums: Joseph S. Darling Memorial Stadium (1999–2004); The Apprentice School (2005–2010)
- Previous locations: Hampton, Virginia; Newport News, Virginia
- Operated: 1946, 1948–1995; 1999–present
- Conference tie-ins: Sun Belt Conference
- Previous conference tie-ins: Southern Conference; Atlantic Coast Conference; Colonial Athletic Association; Conference USA

Sponsors
- Khedive Temple of the Shriners

2025 matchup
- Georgia State vs. Old Dominion (Old Dominion wins 27–10)

The Oyster Bowl is an annual regular season college football game played in the Hampton Roads region of Virginia. The game has featured match-ups between high schools, NCAA Division III teams, and NCAA Division I teams. The current rendition of the game serves as an in-conference matchup for the Old Dominion Monarchs. It is sponsored by the Chesapeake, Virginia-based Khedive Temple of the Shriners, which includes a portion of the revenue going to children's charity.

As a major college neutral-site contest in Norfolk, Virginia from 1948 to 1995, the Oyster Bowl served as the region's counterpart to the Tobacco Bowl in Richmond, Virginia (1949–1982), and the short-lived Harvest Bowl in Roanoke, Virginia (1958–1969), which were also regular season neutral-site games.

== History ==
During the first incarnation of the Oyster Bowl, the game was held at Foreman Field in Norfolk, Virginia. The inaugural contest, held in 1946, featured two high school teams, the local Granby Comets and the Clifton Mustangs of Clifton, New Jersey. After a one-year break, the game was resumed in 1948 as a major college football contest, and was played continuously until 1995, when it was discontinued for financial reasons. The series of games from 1946 to 1995 generated more than $3 million for the Shriners Hospitals for Children.

Many well known players participated in the Oyster Bowl during the time it featured Division I teams. These include Ernie Davis of Syracuse, Bruce Smith of Virginia Tech, Roger Staubach of Navy, Fran Tarkenton of Georgia, and Randy White of Maryland. The 1977 game between East Carolina and William & Mary featured an incident well-publicized at the time, in which former East Carolina head coach Jim Johnson, attending the game as a sideline spectator, tackled a William & Mary player about to score the game-winning touchdown.

In 1999, after a hiatus of three years, the Oyster Bowl was revived and relocated to Joseph S. Darling Memorial Stadium in nearby Hampton, Virginia, as a match-up between Division III college teams. Three of the six games in Hampton featured the Apprentice School from nearby Newport News, Virginia. In 2005 the Oyster Bowl moved to Newport News as an annual home game for the Apprentice School.

In 2011, the Oyster Bowl returned to a renovated Foreman Field (now known as S.B. Ballard Stadium) as an annual home game for Division I Old Dominion University (ODU). Recent visiting teams have been conference rivals of ODU from Conference USA (through 2021) and the Sun Belt Conference (2022 to the present).

== Game results ==
Year	Site	Winning team		Losing team		Reference
1946	Norfolk, Virginia	Granby High School	6	Clifton High School	0	
1947	No game held					
1948	Norfolk, Virginia	William & Mary	31	VMI	0	
1949	Norfolk, Virginia	NC State	14	VPI	13	
1950	Norfolk, Virginia	William & Mary	34	NC State	0	
1951	Norfolk, Virginia	Duke	55	VPI	6	
1952	Norfolk, Virginia	South Carolina	21	Virginia	14	
1953	Norfolk, Virginia	Duke	48	Virginia	6	
1954	Norfolk, Virginia	Navy	40	Duke	7	
1955	Norfolk, Virginia	North Carolina	32	South Carolina	14	
1956	Norfolk, Virginia	Pittsburgh	27	Duke	14	
1957	Norfolk, Virginia	Navy	27	Georgia	14	
1958	Norfolk, Virginia	Tulane	14	Navy	6	
1959	Norfolk, Virginia	Syracuse	32	Navy	6	
1960	Norfolk, Virginia	Navy	26	SMU	7	
1961	Norfolk, Virginia	Duke	30	Navy	9	
1962	Norfolk, Virginia	Navy	32	Pittsburgh	9	
1963	Norfolk, Virginia	Navy	21	VMI	12	
*1964	Norfolk, Virginia	Maryland	10	North Carolina	9	
1965	Norfolk, Virginia	William & Mary	3	Southern Miss	0	
*1966	Norfolk, Virginia	Southern Miss	7	NC State	6	
1967	Norfolk, Virginia	Duke	35	Navy	16	
1968	Norfolk, Virginia	Duke	30	Maryland	28	
1969	Norfolk, Virginia	VPI	48	Duke	12	
1970	Norfolk, Virginia	NC State	7	Maryland	0	
1971	Norfolk, Virginia	Clemson	3	Duke	0	
*1972	Norfolk, Virginia	Duke	17	Navy	16	
*1973	Norfolk, Virginia	Maryland	30	Duke	10	
1974	Norfolk, Virginia	Maryland	56	Duke	13	
1975	Norfolk, Virginia	Virginia Tech	24	William & Mary	7	
1976	Norfolk, Virginia	VMI	13	Virginia	7	
1977	Norfolk, Virginia	William & Mary	21	East Carolina	17	
*1978	Norfolk, Virginia	East Carolina	21	Richmond	14	
1979	Norfolk, Virginia	Navy	24	William & Mary	7	
1980	Norfolk, Virginia	Virginia Tech	21	VMI	6	
1981	Norfolk, Virginia	VMI	14	The Citadel	0	
1982	Norfolk, Virginia	Virginia Tech	14	VMI	3	
1983	Norfolk, Virginia	William & Mary	26	Yale	14	
1984	Norfolk, Virginia	Virginia Tech	54	VMI	7	
1985	Norfolk, Virginia	Richmond	38	James Madison	15	
1986	Norfolk, Virginia	Temple	29	Virginia Tech	16	
1987	Norfolk, Virginia	William & Mary	17	VMI	6	
1988	Norfolk, Virginia	The Citadel	30	VMI	20	
*1989	Norfolk, Virginia	William & Mary	13	Boston University	10	
1990	Norfolk, Virginia	William & Mary	59	VMI	47	
1991	Norfolk, Virginia	The Citadel	17	VMI	14	
1992	Norfolk, Virginia	Richmond	41	VMI	18	
1993	Norfolk, Virginia	William & Mary	49	VMI	6	
1994	Norfolk, Virginia	The Citadel	58	VMI	14	
1995	Norfolk, Virginia	Georgia Southern	31	VMI	13	
1996	No game held					
1997	No game held					
1998	No game held					
1999	Hampton, Virginia	Wesley (DE)	48	Apprentice	33	
2000	Hampton, Virginia	Methodist	30	Apprentice	8	
2001	Hampton, Virginia	Christopher Newport	14	Ferrum	11	
2002	Hampton, Virginia	Salisbury	48	Apprentice	17	
2003	Hampton, Virginia	Bridgewater	58	Catholic University	20	
2004	Hampton, Virginia	Christopher Newport	21	Bridgewater	16	
2005	Newport News, Virginia	Wesley (DE)	45	Apprentice	0	
2006	Newport News, Virginia	Apprentice	37	Chowan	0	
2007	Newport News, Virginia	Chowan	61	Apprentice	55	
2008	Newport News, Virginia	Apprentice	37	Southern Virginia	14	
2009	Newport News, Virginia	Southern Virginia	14	Apprentice	10	
2010	Newport News, Virginia	Webber International	40	Apprentice	7	
2011	Norfolk, Virginia	Old Dominion	23	James Madison	20	
2012	Norfolk, Virginia	Old Dominion	31	Delaware	26	
2013	Norfolk, Virginia	Old Dominion	66	Albany	10	
2014	Norfolk, Virginia	Old Dominion	30	Louisiana Tech	27	
2015	Norfolk, Virginia	Florida Atlantic	33	Old Dominion	31	
2016	Norfolk, Virginia	Old Dominion	42	FIU	28	
2017	Norfolk, Virginia	Old Dominion	24	Rice	21	
2018	Norfolk, Virginia	Old Dominion	77	VMI	14	
2019	Norfolk, Virginia	Charlotte	38	Old Dominion	22	
2020	No game held					
2021	Norfolk, Virginia	Old Dominion	56	Charlotte	34	
2022	Norfolk, Virginia	James Madison	37	Old Dominion	3	
2023	Norfolk, Virginia	Old Dominion	28	Appalachian State	21	
2024	Norfolk, Virginia	Marshall	42	Old Dominion	35	
2025	Norfolk, Virginia	Old Dominion	27	Georgia State	10	
