= 1975 William & Mary Indians football team =

American college football season

1975 William & Mary Indians football
- Conference: Southern Conference
- Record: 2–9 (2–3 SoCon)
- Head coach: Jim Root (4th season)
- Defensive coordinator: Lou Tepper (4th season)
- Captains: Craig McCurdy; Paul Kruis
- Home stadium: Cary Field

1975 Southern Conference football standings
	Conf.					Overall
Team	W		L		T	W		L		T
Richmond $	5	–	1	–	0	5	–	6	–	0
East Carolina	4	–	2	–	0	8	–	3	–	0
Appalachian State	3	–	2	–	0	8	–	3	–	0
The Citadel	4	–	3	–	0	6	–	5	–	0
William & Mary	2	–	3	–	0	2	–	9	–	0
Furman	2	–	4	–	0	5	–	5	–	1
VMI	2	–	4	–	0	3	–	8	–	0
Davidson	0	–	3	–	0	1	–	8	–	0
$ – Conference champion

The 1975 William & Mary Indians football team represented the College of William & Mary as a member of the Southern Conference (SoCon) during the 1975 NCAA Division I football season. Led by Jim Root in his fourth year as head coach, William & Mary finished the season 2–9 overall and 2–3 in SoCon play to place fifth.

== Schedule ==
Date	Opponent	Site	Result	Attendance	Source
September 6	at North Carolina*	Kenan Memorial Stadium; Chapel Hill, NC	L 7–33	31,500	
September 20	at East Carolina	Ficklen Stadium; Greenville, NC	L 0–20	15,542	
September 27	at Pittsburgh*	Pitt Stadium; Pittsburgh, PA	L 0–47	31,022	
October 4	at The Citadel	Johnson Hagood Stadium; Charleston, SC	L 6–21	15,845	
October 11	Ohio*	Cary Field; Williamsburg, VA	L 8–22	12,000	
October 18	at Rutgers*	Rutgers Stadium; Piscataway, NJ	L 0–24	10,000	
October 25	Furman	Cary Field; Williamsburg, VA	L 6–21	7,000	
November 1	vs. Virginia Tech*	Foreman Field; Norfolk, VA (Oyster Bowl)	L 7–24	28,000	
November 8	at VMI	Alumni Memorial Field; Lexington, VA (rivalry)	W 13–7	6,200	
November 15	Colgate*	Cary Field; Williamsburg, VA	L 17–21	8,000	
November 22	Richmond	Cary Field; Williamsburg, VA (rivalry)	W 31–21	11,000	
*Non-conference game
