= 1981 Western Carolina Catamounts football team =

American college football season

1981 Western Carolina Catamounts football
- Conference: Southern Conference
- Record: 4–7 (3–4 SoCon)
- Head coach: Bob Waters (13th season)
- Home stadium: E. J. Whitmire Stadium

1981 Southern Conference football standings
	Conf.					Overall
Team	W		L		T	W		L		T
Furman $	5	–	2	–	0	8	–	3	–	0
VMI	3	–	1	–	1	6	–	3	–	1
East Tennessee State	4	–	2	–	0	6	–	5	–	0
Chattanooga	3	–	2	–	1	7	–	3	–	1
The Citadel	3	–	2	–	1	7	–	3	–	1
Western Carolina	3	–	4	–	0	4	–	7	–	0
Appalachian State	1	–	5	–	1	3	–	7	–	1
Marshall	1	–	5	–	0	2	–	9	–	0
Davidson	0	–	0	–	0	4	–	6	–	0
$ – Conference champion; This conference was a hybrid of I-AA and I-A programs. Davidson was classified as I-AA. The rest of the teams were I-A.

The 1981 Western Carolina Catamounts team was an American football team that represented Western Carolina University as a member of the Southern Conference (SoCon) during the 1981 NCAA Division I-A football season. In their 13th year under head coach Bob Waters, the team compiled an overall record of 4–7, with a mark of 3–4 in conference play, finishing in sixth place in the SoCon.

== Schedule ==
Date	Opponent	Site	Result	Attendance	Source
September 5	at East Carolina*	Ficklen Memorial Stadium; Greenville, NC	L 6–42	24,873	
September 12	at VMI	Alumni Memorial Field; Lexington, VA	L 14–21		
September 19	at The Citadel	Johnson Hagood Stadium; Charleston, SC	L 3–12	18,950	
September 26	Furman	E. J. Whitmire Stadium; Cullowhee, NC	L 27–31	11,850	
October 3	Middle Tennessee*	E. J. Whitmire Stadium; Cullowhee, NC	L 7–20	7,200	
October 10	at Wofford*	Snyder Field; Spartanburg, SC	W 37–30	5,405	
October 17	East Tennessee State	E. J. Whitmire Stadium; Cullowhee, NC	L 23–34	11,250	
October 24	Chattanooga	E. J. Whitmire Stadium; Cullowhee, NC	W 24–10		
October 31	at No. 17 Florida State*	Doak Campbell Stadium; Tallahassee, FL	L 31–56	52,721	
November 14	at Marshall	Fairfield Stadium; Huntington, WV	W 38–28		
November 21	Appalachian State	E. J. Whitmire Stadium; Cullowhee, NC (rivalry)	W 21–10	11,218	
*Non-conference game; Rankings from AP Poll released prior to the game
