= 1980 The Citadel Bulldogs football team =

American college football season

1980 The Citadel Bulldogs football
- Conference: Southern Conference
- Record: 7–4 (3–2 SoCon)
- Head coach: Art Baker (3rd season)
- Home stadium: Johnson Hagood Stadium

1980 Southern Conference football standings
	Conf.					Overall
Team	W		L		T	W		L		T
Furman $	7	–	0	–	0	9	–	1	–	1
Chattanooga	5	–	2	–	0	8	–	3	–	0
Appalachian State	4	–	2	–	1	6	–	4	–	1
The Citadel	3	–	2	–	0	7	–	4	–	0
Western Carolina	2	–	4	–	1	3	–	7	–	1
VMI	1	–	4	–	1	3	–	7	–	1
East Tennessee State	1	–	4	–	0	2	–	9	–	0
Marshall	0	–	5	–	1	2	–	8	–	1
Davidson	0	–	0	–	0	5	–	5	–	0
$ – Conference champion; This conference was a hybrid of I-A and I-AA programs. Davidson was classified as I-AA. The rest of the teams were I-A.

The 1980 The Citadel Bulldogs football team represented The Citadel, The Military College of South Carolina in the 1980 NCAA Division I-A football season. Art Baker served as head coach for the third season. The Bulldogs played as members of the Southern Conference and played home games at Johnson Hagood Stadium.

== Schedule ==
Date	Opponent	Site	Result	Attendance	Source
September 6	Presbyterian*	Johnson Hagood Stadium; Charleston, SC	W 21–14	20,240	
September 13	at Appalachian State	Conrad Stadium; Boone, NC	L 14–17	15,250	
September 20	at Wake Forest*	Groves Stadium; Winston–Salem, NC	L 7–24	22,500	
September 27	Chattanooga	Johnson Hagood Stadium; Charleston, SC	W 29–13	18,345	
October 4	VMI	Johnson Hagood Stadium; Charleston, SC (rivalry)	W 28–0	17,450	
October 11	at Western Carolina	E. J. Whitmire Stadium; Cullowhee, NC	W 28–21	10,640	
October 25	Newberry*	Johnson Hagood Stadium; Charleston, SC	W 37–0	18,980	
November 1	Wofford*	Johnson Hagood Stadium; Charleston, SC (rivalry)	W 35–3	16,250	
November 8	at No. 15 South Carolina*	Williams–Brice Stadium; Columbia, SC	L 24–45	55,937	
November 15	Davidson*^{†}	Johnson Hagood Stadium; Charleston, SC	W 31–13	14,150	
November 22	at Furman	Paladin Stadium; Greenville, SC (rivalry)	L 15–28	17,665	
*Non-conference game; ^{†}Homecoming; Rankings from AP Poll released prior to the game
