= Bill Oliver (American football) =

American football player and coach (1939–2025)

Biographical details
- Born: November 1, 1939; Epes, Alabama, U.S.
- Died: April 14, 2025 (aged 85); Alexander City, Alabama, U.S.
- Education: Alabama

Playing career
- 1959–1961: Alabama
- Position: Defensive back

Coaching career (HC unless noted)
- 1966–1970: Auburn (DB)
- 1971–1979: Alabama (DB)
- 1980–1983: Chattanooga
- 1984–1985: Memphis Showboats (DC)
- 1986–1988: Clemson (DB)
- 1989: Clemson (DC/DB)
- 1990–1992: Alabama (DB)
- 1993–1995: Alabama (DC)
- 1996–1998: Auburn (DC)
- 1998: Auburn (interim HC)

Head coaching record
- Overall: 31–17–1

William Earl "Brother" Oliver (November 1, 1939 – April 14, 2025) was an American college football player and coach. He served as a head coach at the University of Tennessee at Chattanooga from 1980 to 1983 and at Auburn University as an interim head coach for the final five games of the 1998 season, compiling a career head coaching record of 31–17–1.

== Playing career ==
Oliver played football and baseball at Livingston High School. He was recruited by Bear Bryant to play quarterback at University of Alabama, but switched to defensive back, appearing in three bowl games--Liberty (1959), Bluebonnet (1960) and Sugar (1962)--and winning the national championship in his senior season.

Oliver played one season of baseball for Alabama, earning All-Southeastern Conference (SEC) honors.

== Coaching career ==
After starting his coaching career as an assistant at RL Osborne High and then head coach at Guntersville High School, Oliver joined Auburn as a secondary coach in 1966 under coach Ralph Jordan. Oliver remained at Auburn until 1971, when he left for the same position at Alabama.

In 1980, Oliver became head coach at the University of Tennessee at Chattanooga, a position he held until 1983. His .670 winning percentage (29-14-1 record), is the highest in the school's Division I era.

Oliver was the defensive coordinator for the Memphis Showboats of the United States Football League in 1984 and 1985, and then coached the secondary at Clemson University.

In 1990, Gene Stallings hired Oliver as a secondary coach at Alabama and promoted him to defensive coordinator in 1993 after he was the de facto coordinator of Alabama's 1992 national title winning defense. Alabama's athletic director, Hootie Ingram purportedly promised that Oliver would succeed Stallings as head coach, but Ingram was fired in 1995 when the program faced NCAA sanctions. In 1996, Oliver accepted a position as Auburn's defensive coordinator, which he held until 1998. After Auburn head coach Terry Bowden resigned, Oliver served as interim head coach and was a candidate for the permanent position. Auburn, however, hired Tommy Tuberville, and Oliver retired from coaching football.

== Honors and death ==
In May 2013, he was inducted into the Alabama Sports Hall of Fame. He was elected SEC Working Coach of the Year in 1977 and 1993.

Oliver died April 14, 2025, at the age of 85 in Alexander City, Alabama.

== Head coaching record ==
Year	Team	Overall	Conference	Standing	Bowl/playoffs	NCAA^{#}
Chattanooga Mocs (Southern Conference) (1980–1983)
1980	Chattanooga	8–3	5–2	2nd		
1981	Chattanooga	7–3–1	3–2–1	T–4th		
1982	Chattanooga	7–4	5–1	2nd		17
1983	Chattanooga	7–4	5–2	3rd		
Chattanooga:		29–14–1	18–7–1			
Auburn Tigers (Southeastern Conference) (1998)
1998	Auburn	2–3 (Note: Terry Bowden resigned as head coach after six games. Oliver was appointed interim head coach and led Auburn for the remaining five games of the season.)	0–3	6th (Western)		
Auburn:		2–3	0–3			
Total:		31–17–1				
^{#}Rankings from final NCAA poll.
