= 1980 VMI Keydets football team =

American college football season

1980 VMI Keydets football
- Conference: Southern Conference
- Record: 3–7–1 (1–4–1 SoCon)
- Head coach: Bob Thalman (10th season)
- Home stadium: Alumni Memorial Field

1980 Southern Conference football standings
	Conf.					Overall
Team	W		L		T	W		L		T
Furman $	7	–	0	–	0	9	–	1	–	1
Chattanooga	5	–	2	–	0	8	–	3	–	0
Appalachian State	4	–	2	–	1	6	–	4	–	1
The Citadel	3	–	2	–	0	7	–	4	–	0
Western Carolina	2	–	4	–	1	3	–	7	–	1
VMI	1	–	4	–	1	3	–	7	–	1
East Tennessee State	1	–	4	–	0	2	–	9	–	0
Marshall	0	–	5	–	1	2	–	8	–	1
Davidson	0	–	0	–	0	5	–	5	–	0
$ – Conference champion; This conference was a hybrid of I-A and I-AA programs. Davidson was classified as I-AA. The rest of the teams were I-A.

The 1980 VMI Keydets football team was an American football team that represented the Virginia Military Institute (VMI) as a member of the Southern Conference (SoCon) during the 1980 NCAA Division I-A football season. In their tenth year under head coach Bob Thalman, the team compiled an overall record of 3–7–1 with a mark of 1–4–1 in conference play, placing sixth in the SoCon.

== Schedule ==
Date	Opponent	Site	Result	Attendance	Source
September 6	at Western Carolina	E. J. Whitmire Stadium; Cullowhee, NC	L 14–16	10,638	
September 13	at William & Mary*	Cary Field; Williamsburg, VA (rivalry)	W 13–10	14,000	
September 20	Marshall	Alumni Memorial Field; Lexington, VA	W 17–3	6,800	
September 27	at Furman	Sirrine Stadium; Greenville, SC	L 16–21	12,112	
October 4	at The Citadel	Johnson Hagood Stadium; Charleston, SC (rivalry)	L 0–28	17,450	
October 11	Chattanooga	Alumni Memorial Field; Lexington, VA	L 10–55		
October 18	at Richmond*	City Stadium; Richmond, VA (rivalry)	W 22–17	14,600	
October 25	Villanova*	Alumni Memorial Field; Lexington, VA	L 6–17	3,200	
November 1	at No. T–7 Boston University*	Nickerson Field; Boston, MA	L 22–38	3,000	
November 8	Appalachian State	Alumni Memorial Field; Lexington, VA	T 16–16	4,700	
November 15	vs. Virginia Tech*	Foreman Field; Norfolk, VA (Oyster Bowl, rivalry)	L 6–21	25,000	
*Non-conference game; Rankings from Associated Press Poll released prior to the game
