= 1975 The Citadel Bulldogs football team =

American college football season

1975 The Citadel Bulldogs football
- Conference: Southern Conference
- Record: 6–5 (4–3 SoCon)
- Head coach: Bobby Ross (3rd season)
- Home stadium: Johnson Hagood Stadium

1975 Southern Conference football standings
	Conf.					Overall
Team	W		L		T	W		L		T
Richmond $	5	–	1	–	0	5	–	6	–	0
East Carolina	4	–	2	–	0	8	–	3	–	0
Appalachian State	3	–	2	–	0	8	–	3	–	0
The Citadel	4	–	3	–	0	6	–	5	–	0
William & Mary	2	–	3	–	0	2	–	9	–	0
Furman	2	–	4	–	0	5	–	5	–	1
VMI	2	–	4	–	0	3	–	8	–	0
Davidson	0	–	3	–	0	1	–	8	–	0
$ – Conference champion

The 1975 The Citadel Bulldogs football team represented The Citadel, The Military College of South Carolina in the 1975 NCAA Division I football season. Bobby Ross served as head coach for the third season. The Bulldogs played as members of the Southern Conference and played home games at Johnson Hagood Stadium.

== Schedule ==
Date	Opponent	Site	Result	Attendance	Source
September 13	Presbyterian*	Johnson Hagood Stadium; Charleston, SC	W 21–0	21,465	
September 20	at Colgate*	Andy Kerr Stadium; Hamilton, NY	L 0–16	7,500	
September 27	Wofford*	Johnson Hagood Stadium; Charleston, SC (rivalry)	W 16–7	19,845	
October 4	William & Mary	Johnson Hagood Stadium; Charleston, SC	W 21–6	15,845	
October 11	East Carolina*	Johnson Hagood Stadium; Charleston, SC	L 0–3	16,842	
October 18	at Davidson	Richardson Stadium; Davidson, NC	W 44–0	3,800	
October 25	at VMI	Alumni Memorial Field; Lexington, VA (rivalry)	W 6–3	8,600	
November 1	Appalachian State	Johnson Hagood Stadium; Charleston, SC	L 17–22	18,485	
November 8	at Richmond	City Stadium; Richmond, VA	L 0–7	12,500	
November 15	Furman^{†}	Johnson Hagood Stadium; Charleston, SC (rivalry)	W 13–9		
November 22	at Chattanooga*	Chamberlain Field; Chattanooga, TN	L 6–24	6,007	
*Non-conference game; ^{†}Homecoming
