= 1981 Appalachian State Mountaineers football team =

American college football season

1981 Appalachian State Mountaineers football
- Conference: Southern Conference
- Record: 3–7–1 (1–5–1 SoCon)
- Head coach: Mike Working (2nd season)
- Home stadium: Conrad Stadium

1981 Southern Conference football standings
	Conf.					Overall
Team	W		L		T	W		L		T
Furman $	5	–	2	–	0	8	–	3	–	0
VMI	3	–	1	–	1	6	–	3	–	1
East Tennessee State	4	–	2	–	0	6	–	5	–	0
Chattanooga	3	–	2	–	1	7	–	3	–	1
The Citadel	3	–	2	–	1	7	–	3	–	1
Western Carolina	3	–	4	–	0	4	–	7	–	0
Appalachian State	1	–	5	–	1	3	–	7	–	1
Marshall	1	–	5	–	0	2	–	9	–	0
Davidson	0	–	0	–	0	4	–	6	–	0
$ – Conference champion; This conference was a hybrid of I-AA and I-A programs. Davidson was classified as I-AA. The rest of the teams were I-A.

The 1981 Appalachian State Mountaineers football team was an American football team that represented Appalachian State University as a member of the Southern Conference (SoCon) during the 1981 NCAA Division I-A football season. In their second year under head coach Mike Working, the Mountaineers compiled an overall record of 3–7–1 with a mark of 1–5–1 in conference play, and finished seventh in the SoCon.

== Schedule ==
Date	Opponent	Site	Result	Attendance	Source
September 5	Lenoir–Rhyne*	Conrad Stadium; Boone, NC	W 48–9	12,150	
September 12	James Madison*	Conrad Stadium; Boone, NC	W 45–0	9,200	
September 19	Chattanooga	Conrad Stadium; Boone, NC	W 31–14	16,300	
September 26	at The Citadel	Johnson Hagood Stadium; Charleston, SC	L 20–34	17,250	
October 3	at Wake Forest*	Groves Stadium; Winston-Salem, NC	L 14–15	24,500	
October 10	at Furman	Paladin Stadium; Greenville, SC	L 18–22	19,058	
October 17	VMI	Conrad Stadium; Boone, NC	T 14–14	18,830	
October 24	at Virginia Tech*	Lane Stadium; Blacksburg, VA	L 12–34	45,200	
November 7	Marshall	Conrad Stadium; Boone, NC (rivalry)	L 10–17	8,280	
November 14	at East Tennessee State	Memorial Center; Johnson City, TN	L 14–21	7,123	
November 21	at Western Carolina	Whitmire Stadium; Cullowhee, NC (rivalry)	L 10–21	11,218	
*Non-conference game
