= 1979 VMI Keydets football team =

American college football season

1979 VMI Keydets football
- Conference: Southern Conference
- Record: 6–4–1 (4–1 SoCon)
- Head coach: Bob Thalman (9th season)
- Home stadium: Alumni Memorial Field

1979 Southern Conference football standings
	Conf.					Overall
Team	W		L		T	W		L		T
Chattanooga $	5	–	1	–	0	9	–	2	–	0
VMI	4	–	1	–	0	6	–	4	–	1
The Citadel	4	–	2	–	0	6	–	5	–	0
Furman	4	–	3	–	0	5	–	6	–	0
Appalachian State	3	–	4	–	0	3	–	8	–	0
East Tennessee State	2	–	3	–	0	7	–	4	–	0
Western Carolina	2	–	4	–	0	6	–	5	–	0
Marshall	0	–	6	–	0	1	–	10	–	0
Davidson	0	–	0	–	0	6	–	4	–	0
$ – Conference champion

The 1979 VMI Keydets football team was an American football team that represented the Virginia Military Institute (VMI) as a member of the Southern Conference (SoCon) during the 1979 NCAA Division I-A football season. In their ninth year under head coach Bob Thalman, the team compiled an overall record of 6–4–1 with a mark of 4–1 in conference play, placing second in the SoCon.

== Schedule ==
Date	Opponent	Site	Result	Attendance	Source
September 8	William & Mary*	Alumni Memorial Field; Lexington, VA (rivalry)	W 7–3	5,100	
September 15	Richmond*	Alumni Memorial Field; Lexington, VA (rivalry)	W 17–7	6,300	
September 22	at Virginia*	Scott Stadium; Charlottesville, VA	L 0–19	24,872	
September 29	at East Carolina*	Ficklen Memorial Stadium; Greenville, NC	L 10–45	20,201	
October 6	East Tennessee State	Alumni Memorial Field; Lexington, VA	W 24–14	4,600	
October 13	at Appalachian State	Conrad Stadium; Boone, NC	W 27–22	7,624	
October 20	at The Citadel	Johnson Hagood Stadium; Charleston, SC (rivalry)	L 6–37	8,100	
October 27	Furman	Alumni Memorial Field; Lexington, VA	W 21–20	3,800	
November 3	at Connecticut*	Alumni Memorial Stadium; Lexington, VA	T 13–13	4,100	
November 10	at Marshall	Fairfield Stadium; Huntington, WV	W 13–3	7,200	
November 17	at Virginia Tech*	Lane Stadium; Blacksburg, VA (rivalry)	L 20–27	22,300	
*Non-conference game
