= 1982 Appalachian State Mountaineers football team =

American college football season

1982 Appalachian State Mountaineers football
- Conference: Southern Conference
- Record: 4–7 (3–4 SoCon)
- Head coach: Mike Working (3rd season)
- Home stadium: Conrad Stadium

1982 Southern Conference football standings
	Conf.					Overall
Team	W		L		T	W		L		T
No. 6 Furman $^	6	–	1	–	0	9	–	3	–	0
No. 17 Chattanooga	5	–	1	–	0	7	–	4	–	0
Western Carolina	4	–	2	–	0	6	–	5	–	0
The Citadel	3	–	4	–	0	5	–	6	–	0
Appalachian State	3	–	4	–	0	4	–	7	–	0
VMI	2	–	3	–	0	5	–	6	–	0
East Tennessee State	2	–	5	–	0	2	–	9	–	0
Marshall	1	–	6	–	0	3	–	7	–	0
Davidson	0	–	0	–	0	3	–	7	–	0
$ – Conference champion; ^ – NCAA Division I-AA playoff participant; Rankings from NCAA Division I-AA Football Committee poll

The 1982 Appalachian State Mountaineers football team was an American football team that represented Appalachian State University as a member of the Southern Conference (SoCon) during the 1982 NCAA Division I-AA football season. In their third year under head coach Mike Working, the Mountaineers compiled an overall record of 4–7 with a mark of 3–4 in conference play, tying for fourth in the SoCon.

== Schedule ==
Date	Time	Opponent	Site	Result	Attendance	Source
September 11		at James Madison*	JMU Stadium; Harrisonburg, VA	L 35–39	7,750	
September 18		Furman	Conrad Stadium; Boone, NC	L 21–27	15,500	
September 25		at Wake Forest*	Groves Stadium; Winston-Salem, NC	L 22–31	29,100	
October 2		The Citadel	Conrad Stadium; Boone, NC	W 48–22	15,800	
October 9	7:00 p.m.	at Marshall	Fairfield Stadium; Huntington, WV (rivalry)	W 21–13	9,117	
October 16		Lenoir–Rhyne*	Conrad Stadium; Boone, NC	W 49–0	11,250	
October 23		at Virginia Tech*	Lane Stadium; Blacksburg, VA	L 0–34	37,400	
October 30		East Tennessee State	Conrad Stadium; Boone, NC	W 29–13	16,150	
November 6		at No. 18 Chattanooga	Chamberlain Field; Chattanooga, TN	L 7–50	8,787	
November 13		at VMI	Alumni Memorial Field; Lexington, VA	L 14–31	3,700	
November 20		Western Carolina	Conrad Stadium; Boone, NC (rivalry)	L 24–26	6,150	
*Non-conference game; Rankings from NCAA Division I-AA Football Committee Poll released prior to the game; All times are in Eastern time
