= 1982 Furman Paladins football team =

American college football season

1982 Furman Paladins football

SoCon champion

NCAA Division I-AA First Round, L 0–17 vs. South Carolina State
- Conference: Southern Conference
- Record: 9–3 (6–1 SoCon)
- Head coach: Dick Sheridan (5th season)
- Captains: Mike Coleman; Gib McEachran; Briggs Traylor; Billy Hall; Hollis Barton
- Home stadium: Paladin Stadium

1982 Southern Conference football standings
	Conf.					Overall
Team	W		L		T	W		L		T
No. 6 Furman $^	6	–	1	–	0	9	–	3	–	0
No. 17 Chattanooga	5	–	1	–	0	7	–	4	–	0
Western Carolina	4	–	2	–	0	6	–	5	–	0
The Citadel	3	–	4	–	0	5	–	6	–	0
Appalachian State	3	–	4	–	0	4	–	7	–	0
VMI	2	–	3	–	0	5	–	6	–	0
East Tennessee State	2	–	5	–	0	2	–	9	–	0
Marshall	1	–	6	–	0	3	–	7	–	0
Davidson	0	–	0	–	0	3	–	7	–	0
$ – Conference champion; ^ – NCAA Division I-AA playoff participant; Rankings from NCAA Division I-AA Football Committee poll

The 1982 Furman Paladins football team was an American football team that represented Furman University as a member of the Southern Conference (SoCon) during the 1982 NCAA Division I-AA football season. In their fifth year under head coach Dick Sheridan, the Paladins compiled an overall record of 9–3 with a conference mark of 6–1, winning the SoCon title for the third consecutive season. Furman advanced to the NCAA Division I-AA Football Championship playoffs, where they were defeated by South Carolina State in the first round.

== Schedule ==
Date	Time	Opponent	Rank	Site	Result	Attendance	Source
September 4		at NC State*		Carter–Finley Stadium; Raleigh, NC	L 0–26	41,300	
September 18		at Appalachian State		Conrad Stadium; Boone, NC	W 27–21	15,500	
September 25		at No. 20 Chattanooga		Chamberlain Field; Chattanooga, TN	L 13–16	6,547	
October 2		VMI		Paladin Stadium; Greenville, SC	W 38–3	13,187	
October 9		Western Carolina		Paladin Stadium; Greenville, SC	W 12–6	13,250	
October 16		at South Carolina*		Williams–Brice Stadium; Columbia, SC	W 28–23	56,244	
October 23		at East Tennessee State	No. T–15	Memorial Center; Johnson City, TN	W 20–15	7,500	
October 30		Davidson*	No. 11	Paladin Stadium; Greenville, SC	W 63–14	12,136	
November 6		No. 18 James Madison*	No. 9	Paladin Stadium; Greenville, SC	W 17–10	12,370	
November 13	1:30 p.m.	at Marshall	No. 7	Fairfield Stadium; Huntington, WV	W 45–7	7,673	
November 20		The Citadel	No. 6	Paladin Stadium; Greenville, SC (rivalry)	W 27–0	13,123	
November 27		No. 7 South Carolina State*	No. 6	Paladin Stadium; Greenville, SC (NCAA Division I-AA First Round)	L 0–17	13,865	
*Non-conference game; Rankings from NCAA Division I-AA Football Committee Poll released prior to the game; All times are in Eastern time
