= 1982 Western Carolina Catamounts football team =

American college football season

1982 Western Carolina Catamounts football
- Conference: Southern Conference
- Record: 6–5 (4–2 SoCon)
- Head coach: Bob Waters (14th season)
- Defensive coordinator: Mike Hennigan (1st season)
- Home stadium: E. J. Whitmire Stadium

1982 Southern Conference football standings
	Conf.					Overall
Team	W		L		T	W		L		T
No. 6 Furman $^	6	–	1	–	0	9	–	3	–	0
No. 17 Chattanooga	5	–	1	–	0	7	–	4	–	0
Western Carolina	4	–	2	–	0	6	–	5	–	0
The Citadel	3	–	4	–	0	5	–	6	–	0
Appalachian State	3	–	4	–	0	4	–	7	–	0
VMI	2	–	3	–	0	5	–	6	–	0
East Tennessee State	2	–	5	–	0	2	–	9	–	0
Marshall	1	–	6	–	0	3	–	7	–	0
Davidson	0	–	0	–	0	3	–	7	–	0
$ – Conference champion; ^ – NCAA Division I-AA playoff participant; Rankings from NCAA Division I-AA Football Committee poll

The 1982 Western Carolina Catamounts team was an American football team that represented Western Carolina University as a member of the Southern Conference (SoCon) during the 1982 NCAA Division I-AA football season. In their 14th year under head coach Bob Waters, the team compiled an overall record of 6–5, with a mark of 4–2 in conference play, and finished in third place in the SoCon.

== Schedule ==
Date	Opponent	Site	Result	Attendance	Source
September 4	at Wake Forest*	Groves Stadium; Winston-Salem, NC	L 10–31	25,476	
September 11	Tennessee Tech*	E. J. Whitmire Stadium; Cullowhee, NC	L 10–17	8,540	
September 18	Mars Hill*	E. J. Whitmire Stadium; Cullowhee, NC	W 38–3	11,120	
September 25	at Clemson*	Memorial Stadium; Clemson, SC	L 10–21	61,369	
October 2	at East Tennessee State	Memorial Center; Johnson City, TN	W 27–25	6,500	
October 9	at Furman	Paladin Stadium; Greenville, SC	L 6–12	13,250	
October 16	Marshall	E. J. Whitmire Stadium; Cullowhee, NC	W 21–13	5,522	
October 23	Wofford*	E. J. Whitmire Stadium; Cullowhee, NC	W 36–17	11,360	
October 30	at No. 12 Chattanooga	Chamberlain Field; Chattanooga, TN	W 20–0	8,004	
November 6	The Citadel	E. J. Whitmire Stadium; Cullowhee, NC	L 20–24	8,132	
November 20	at Appalachian State	Conrad Stadium; Boone, NC (rivalry)	W 26–24	6,150	
*Non-conference game; Rankings from NCAA Division I-AA Football Committee Poll released prior to the game
