= 1980 Chattanooga Moccasins football team =

American college football season

1980 Chattanooga Moccasins football
- Conference: Southern Conference
- Record: 8–3 (5–2 SoCon)
- Head coach: Bill Oliver (1st season)
- Captain: Game captains
- Home stadium: Chamberlain Field

1980 Southern Conference football standings
	Conf.					Overall
Team	W		L		T	W		L		T
Furman $	7	–	0	–	0	9	–	1	–	1
Chattanooga	5	–	2	–	0	8	–	3	–	0
Appalachian State	4	–	2	–	1	6	–	4	–	1
The Citadel	3	–	2	–	0	7	–	4	–	0
Western Carolina	2	–	4	–	1	3	–	7	–	1
VMI	1	–	4	–	1	3	–	7	–	1
East Tennessee State	1	–	4	–	0	2	–	9	–	0
Marshall	0	–	5	–	1	2	–	8	–	1
Davidson	0	–	0	–	0	5	–	5	–	0
$ – Conference champion; This conference was a hybrid of I-A and I-AA programs. Davidson was classified as I-AA. The rest of the teams were I-A.

The 1980 Chattanooga Moccasins football team represented the University of Tennessee at Chattanooga as a member of the Southern Conference (SoCon) in the 1980 NCAA Division I-A football season. The Moccasins were led by first-year head coach Bill Oliver and played their home games at Chamberlain Field. They finished the season 8–3 overall and 5–2 in SoCon play to place second.

== Schedule ==
Date	Opponent	Site	Result	Attendance	Source
September 6	at Jacksonville State*	Paul Snow Stadium; Jacksonville, AL	W 16–13	12,000	
September 13	at Middle Tennessee*	Johnny "Red" Floyd Stadium; Murfreesboro, TN	W 32–7	10,000	
September 20	Appalachian State	Chamberlain Field; Chattanooga, TN	W 14–7	11,000	
September 27	at The Citadel	Johnson Hagood Stadium; Charleston, SC	L 13–29	18,345	
October 4	Furman	Chamberlain Field; Chattanooga, TN	L 28–42	11,000	
October 11	at VMI	Alumni Memorial Field; Lexington, VA	W 55–10		
October 18	at Marshall	Fairfield Stadium; Huntington, WV	W 21–11		
October 25	East Tennessee State^{†}	Chamberlain Field; Chattanooga, TN	W 26–14	10,000	
November 8	Western Carolina	Chamberlain Field; Chattanooga, TN	W 39–14	9,000	
November 15	Illinois State*	Chamberlain Field; Chattanooga, TN	W 27–17	5,200	
November 22	at Vanderbilt*	Dudley Field; Nashville, TN	L 29–31	22,700	
*Non-conference game; ^{†}Homecoming
