= 1979 Davidson Wildcats football team =

American college football season

1979 Davidson Wildcats football
- Conference: Southern Conference
- Record: 6–4 (0–0 SoCon)
- Head coach: Ed Farrell (6th season)
- Home stadium: Richardson Stadium

1979 Southern Conference football standings
	Conf.					Overall
Team	W		L		T	W		L		T
Chattanooga $	5	–	1	–	0	9	–	2	–	0
VMI	4	–	1	–	0	6	–	4	–	1
The Citadel	4	–	2	–	0	6	–	5	–	0
Furman	4	–	3	–	0	5	–	6	–	0
Appalachian State	3	–	4	–	0	3	–	8	–	0
East Tennessee State	2	–	3	–	0	7	–	4	–	0
Western Carolina	2	–	4	–	0	6	–	5	–	0
Marshall	0	–	6	–	0	1	–	10	–	0
Davidson	0	–	0	–	0	6	–	4	–	0
$ – Conference champion

The 1979 Davidson Wildcats football team represented Davidson College as a member of the Southern Conference during the 1979 NCAA Division I-AA football season. Led by sixth-year head coach Ed Farrell, the Wildcats compiled an overall record of 6–4.

== Schedule ==
Date	Opponent	Site	Result	Attendance	Source
September 8	Catawba*	Richardson Stadium; Davidson, NC	W 35–7	4,800	
September 15	Southwestern (TN)*	Richardson Stadium; Davidson, NC	W 42–6	3,000	
September 22	No. 7 Lafayette*	Richardson Stadium; Davidson, NC	W 16–13	3,200	
September 29	at Bucknell*	Memorial Stadium; Lewisburg, PA	L 0–33	2,217	
October 6	Randolph–Macon*^{†}	Richardson Stadium; Davidson, NC	W 35–6	5,000	
October 13	at Lehigh*	Taylor Stadium; Bethlehem, PA	L 0–10	11,500	
October 20	Hampden–Sydney*	Richardson Stadium; Davidson, NC	W 42–0	4,000	
October 27	at Guilford*	Greensboro, NC	W 40–16	2,000	
November 3	Furman*	Richardson Stadium; Davidson, NC	L 55–63	4,500	
November 10	at Wofford*	Snyder Field; Spartanburg, SC	L 28–48	4,250	
*Non-conference game; ^{†}Homecoming; Rankings from AP Poll released prior to the game
