= 1975 Furman Paladins football team =

American college football season

1975 Furman Paladins football
- Conference: Southern Conference
- Record: 5–5–1 (2–4 SoCon)
- Head coach: Art Baker (3rd season)
- Captains: Robbie Caldwell; Mark Mosher
- Home stadium: Sirrine Stadium

1975 Southern Conference football standings
	Conf.					Overall
Team	W		L		T	W		L		T
Richmond $	5	–	1	–	0	5	–	6	–	0
East Carolina	4	–	2	–	0	8	–	3	–	0
Appalachian State	3	–	2	–	0	8	–	3	–	0
The Citadel	4	–	3	–	0	6	–	5	–	0
William & Mary	2	–	3	–	0	2	–	9	–	0
Furman	2	–	4	–	0	5	–	5	–	1
VMI	2	–	4	–	0	3	–	8	–	0
Davidson	0	–	3	–	0	1	–	8	–	0
$ – Conference champion

The 1975 Furman Paladins football team was an American football team that represented Furman University as a member of the Southern Conference (SoCon) during the 1975 NCAA Division I football season. In their third season under head coach Art Baker, Furman compiled a 5–5–1 record, with a mark of 2–4 in conference play, placing sixth in the SoCon.

== Schedule ==
Date	Opponent	Site	Result	Attendance	Source
September 13	Tennessee Tech*	Sirrine Stadium; Greenville, SC	L 5–17		
September 20	at Richmond	City Stadium; Richmond, VA	L 21–27		
September 27	Appalachian State	Sirrine Stadium; Greenville, SC	W 30–23	12,000	
October 4	VMI	Sirrine Stadium; Greenville, SC	L 10–13	10,700	
October 11	at Presbyterian*	Bailey Stadium; Clinton, SC	W 35–7	6,000	
October 18	Holy Cross*	Sirrine Stadium; Greenville, SC	W 21–14	10,000	
October 25	at William & Mary	Cary Field; Williamsburg, VA	W 21–6	7,000	
November 1	at East Carolina	Ficklen Memorial Stadium; Greenville, NC	L 10–21	15,414	
November 8	Western Carolina*	Sirrine Stadium; Greenville, SC	W 34–0	9,000	
November 15	at The Citadel	Johnson Hagood Stadium; Charleston, SC (rivalry)	L 9–13		
November 22	at Wofford*	Snyder Field; Spartanburg, SC (rivalry)	T 14–14		
*Non-conference game

== Roster ==
1975 Furman Paladins football team roster
Players			Coaches
Offense: Pos. / # / Name / Class; QB / 11 / David Whitehurst / Jr	Defense: Pos. / # / Name / Class; DE / / Steve Patton / Jr	Special teams: Pos. / # / Name / Class	Head coach: Art Baker; Coordinators/assistant coaches Legend: (C) Team captain; (S) Suspended; (I) Ineligible; Injured; Redshirt
