= 1975 East Carolina Pirates football team =

American college football season

1975 East Carolina Pirates football
- Conference: Southern Conference
- Record: 8–3 (4–2 SoCon)
- Head coach: Pat Dye (2nd season)
- Home stadium: Ficklen Memorial Stadium

1975 Southern Conference football standings
	Conf.					Overall
Team	W		L		T	W		L		T
Richmond $	5	–	1	–	0	5	–	6	–	0
East Carolina	4	–	2	–	0	8	–	3	–	0
Appalachian State	3	–	2	–	0	8	–	3	–	0
The Citadel	4	–	3	–	0	6	–	5	–	0
William & Mary	2	–	3	–	0	2	–	9	–	0
Furman	2	–	4	–	0	5	–	5	–	1
VMI	2	–	4	–	0	3	–	8	–	0
Davidson	0	–	3	–	0	1	–	8	–	0
$ – Conference champion

The 1975 East Carolina Pirates football team was an American football team that represented East Carolina University as a member of the Southern Conference during the 1975 NCAA Division I football season. In their second season under head coach Pat Dye, the team compiled a 8–3 record.

== Schedule ==
Date	Opponent	Site	Result	Attendance	Source
September 6	at No. 13 NC State*	Carter Stadium; Raleigh, NC (rivalry)	L 3–26	47,500	
September 13	at Appalachian State	Conrad Stadium; Boone, NC	L 25–41	13,000	
September 20	William & Mary	Ficklen Memorial Stadium; Greenville, NC	W 20–0	15,542	
September 27	at Southern Illinois*	McAndrew Stadium; Carbondale, IL	W 41–7	8,614	
October 4	Richmond	Ficklen Memorial Stadium; Greenville, NC	L 14–17	16,542	
October 11	at The Citadel	Johnson Hagood Stadium; Charleston, SC	W 3–0	16,842	
October 18	Western Carolina*	Ficklen Memorial Stadium; Greenville, NC	W 42–14	16,487	
October 25	at North Carolina*	Kenan Memorial Stadium; Chapel Hill, NC	W 38–17	42,000	
November 1	Furman	Ficklen Memorial Stadium; Greenville, NC	W 21–10	15,414	
November 8	at Virginia*	Scott Stadium; Charlottesville, VA	W 61–10	21,950	
November 22	VMI	Ficklen Memorial Stadium; Greenville, NC	W 28–12	13,689	
*Non-conference game; Rankings from AP Poll released prior to the game
