= Joseph S. Darling Memorial Stadium =

High school football stadium in Hampton, Virginia

Coordinates: 37.020544°N 76.355056°W

- Interactive map of Joseph S. Darling Memorial Stadium
- Location: Hampton, Virginia
- Owner: City of Hampton
- Capacity: 8,000
- Surface: artificial Turf
- Scoreboard: Electro-Mech LX3880

Construction
- Built: 1929
- Opened: 1929; 1989 (new stadium)
- Renovated: 1987-1988

Tenants
- Bethel Bruins; Hampton Crabbers; Kecoughtan Warriors; Phoebus Phantoms

Joseph S. Darling Memorial Stadium, located in Hampton, Virginia, serves primarily as a high school football stadium, and also hosts various track-and-field meets, as well as marching band competitions. The 8,000-seat brick facility opened in 1989.

In 1928, the Darling Estate donated land on Hampton's Victoria Road, exclusively for the use of athletic facilities. The original stadium lasted until 1987, two years before the current stadium opened. The city's four high schools -Bethel, Hampton, Kecoughtan, and Phoebus- each use Darling Stadium for their home football games.
