= 1975 VMI Keydets football team =

American college football season

1975 VMI Keydets football
- Conference: Southern Conference
- Record: 3–8 (2–4 SoCon)
- Head coach: Bob Thalman (5th season)
- Home stadium: Alumni Memorial Field

1975 Southern Conference football standings
	Conf.					Overall
Team	W		L		T	W		L		T
Richmond $	5	–	1	–	0	5	–	6	–	0
East Carolina	4	–	2	–	0	8	–	3	–	0
Appalachian State	3	–	2	–	0	8	–	3	–	0
The Citadel	4	–	3	–	0	6	–	5	–	0
William & Mary	2	–	3	–	0	2	–	9	–	0
Furman	2	–	4	–	0	5	–	5	–	1
VMI	2	–	4	–	0	3	–	8	–	0
Davidson	0	–	3	–	0	1	–	8	–	0
$ – Conference champion

The 1975 VMI Keydets football team was an American football team that represented the Virginia Military Institute (VMI) as a member of the Southern Conference (SoCon) during the 1975 NCAA Division I football season. In their fifth year under head coach Bob Thalman, the team compiled an overall record of 3–8 with a mark of 2–4 in conference play, placing tied for sixth in the SoCon.

== Schedule ==
Date	Opponent	Site	Result	Attendance	Source
September 13	Delaware*	Alumni Memorial Field; Lexington, VA	L 9–10	8,800	
September 20	at Virginia*	Scott Stadium; Charlottesville, VA	L 21–22	25,176	
September 27	Davidson	Alumni Memorial Field; Lexington, VA	W 55–0	6,500	
October 4	at Furman	Sirrine Stadium; Greenville, SC	W 13–10	10,700	
October 11	at Georgia Tech*	Grant Field; Atlanta, GA	L 10–38	40,194	
October 18	at Richmond	City Stadium; Richmond, VA (Tobacco Bowl, rivalry)	L 19–24	22,000	
October 25	The Citadel	Alumni Memorial Stadium; Lexington, VA (rivalry)	L 3–6	8,600	
November 8	William & Mary	Alumni Memorial Field; Lexington, VA (rivalry)	L 7–13	6,200	
November 15	at Virginia Tech*	Lane Stadium; Blacksburg, VA (rivalry)	L 0–33	32,000	
November 22	at East Carolina	Ficklen Memorial Stadium; Greenville, NC	L 12–28	13,689	
November 29	at Connecticut*	Memorial Stadium; Storrs, CT	W 13–3	3,927	
*Non-conference game
