= 1979 Chattanooga Moccasins football team =

American college football season

1979 Chattanooga Moccasins football

SoCon champion
- Conference: Southern Conference
- Record: 9–2 (5–1 SoCon)
- Head coach: Joe Morrison (7th season)
- Captain: Game captains
- Home stadium: Chamberlain Field

1979 Southern Conference football standings
	Conf.					Overall
Team	W		L		T	W		L		T
Chattanooga $	5	–	1	–	0	9	–	2	–	0
VMI	4	–	1	–	0	6	–	4	–	1
The Citadel	4	–	2	–	0	6	–	5	–	0
Furman	4	–	3	–	0	5	–	6	–	0
Appalachian State	3	–	4	–	0	3	–	8	–	0
East Tennessee State	2	–	3	–	0	7	–	4	–	0
Western Carolina	2	–	4	–	0	6	–	5	–	0
Marshall	0	–	6	–	0	1	–	10	–	0
Davidson	0	–	0	–	0	6	–	4	–	0
$ – Conference champion

The 1979 Chattanooga Moccasins football team represented the University of Chattanooga as a member of the Southern Conference (SoCon) during the 1979 NCAA Division I-A football season. Led by Joe Morrison in his seventh and final season as head coach, the Moccasins compiled an overall record of 9–2 with mark of 5–1 in conference play, winning the SoCon title for the third consecutive year.

== Schedule ==
Date	Opponent	Site	Result	Attendance	Source
September 8	Western Kentucky*	Chamberlain Field; Chattanooga, TN	W 41–28	10,250	
September 15	Louisiana Tech*	Chamberlain Field; Chattanooga, TN	W 24–7	9,100	
September 22	at Furman	Sirrine Stadium; Greenville, SC	W 45–14		
September 29	Marshall	Chamberlain Field; Chattanooga, TN	W 27–0	9,500	
October 6	at Appalachian State	Conrad Stadium; Boone, NC	W 24–21	16,255	
October 13	at East Tennessee State	Memorial Center; Johnson City, TN	L 0–35	12,331	
October 20	Middle Tennessee State*^{†}	Chamberlain Field; Chattanooga, TN	W 59–15	10,000	
October 27	McNeese State*	Chamberlain Field; Chattanooga, TN	L 17–24		
November 3	at Western Carolina	Whitmire Stadium; Cullowhee, NC	W 42–35	7,109	
November 10	The Citadel	Chamberlain Field; Chattanooga, TN	W 28–7		
November 17	at Illinois State*	Hancock Stadium; Normal, IL	W 42–31	2,742	
*Non-conference game; ^{†}Homecoming
