= 1979 Marshall Thundering Herd football team =

American college football season

1979 Marshall Thundering Herd football
- Conference: Southern Conference
- Record: 1–10 (0–6 SoCon)
- Head coach: Sonny Randle (1st season)
- Captain: Game captains
- Home stadium: Fairfield Stadium

1979 Southern Conference football standings
| | Conf. | | | | | Overall |
| Team | W | | L | | T | W | | L | | T |
|---|---|---|---|---|---|---|---|---|---|---|
| Chattanooga $ | 5 | – | 1 | – | 0 | 9 | – | 2 | – | 0 |
| VMI | 4 | – | 1 | – | 0 | 6 | – | 4 | – | 1 |
| The Citadel | 4 | – | 2 | – | 0 | 6 | – | 5 | – | 0 |
| Furman | 4 | – | 3 | – | 0 | 5 | – | 6 | – | 0 |
| Appalachian State | 3 | – | 4 | – | 0 | 3 | – | 8 | – | 0 |
| East Tennessee State | 2 | – | 3 | – | 0 | 7 | – | 4 | – | 0 |
| Western Carolina | 2 | – | 4 | – | 0 | 6 | – | 5 | – | 0 |
| Marshall | 0 | – | 6 | – | 0 | 1 | – | 10 | – | 0 |
| Davidson | 0 | – | 0 | – | 0 | 6 | – | 4 | – | 0 |
$ – Conference champion

The 1979 Marshall Thundering Herd football team was an American football team that represented Marshall University in the Southern Conference (SoCon) during the 1979 NCAA Division I-A football season. In its first season under head coach Sonny Randle, the team compiled a 1–10 record (0–6 against conference opponents) and was outscored by a total of 309 to 95. The team played its home games at Fairfield Stadium in Huntington, West Virginia.

== Schedule ==
| Date | Opponent | Site | Result | Attendance | Source |
|---|---|---|---|---|---|
| September 8 | Toledo* | Fairfield Stadium; Huntington, WV | W 31–14 | 17,200 | |
| September 15 | Western Carolina | Fairfield Stadium; Huntington, WV | L 0–24 | | |
| September 22 | at Ohio* | Peden Stadium; Athens, OH (rivalry) | L 0–35 | | |
| September 29 | at Chattanooga | Chamberlain Field; Chattanooga, TN | L 0–27 | 9,500 | |
| October 6 | Miami (OH)* | Fairfield Stadium; Huntington, WV | L 0–28 | | |
| October 13 | at Furman | Sirrine Stadium; Greenville, SC | L 24–34 | 5,616 | |
| October 20 | at Mississippi State* | Scott Field; Starkville, MS | L 0–48 | 25,500 | |
| October 27 | Villanova^{†}* | Fairfield Stadium; Huntington, WV | L 14–24 | | |
| November 3 | The Citadel | Fairfield Stadium; Huntington, WV | L 16–17 | 13,000 | |
| November 10 | VMI | Fairfield Stadium; Huntington, WV | L 3–13 | 7,200 | |
| November 17 | at Appalachian State | Kidd Brewer Stadium; Boone, NC (rivalry) | L 7–45 | 8,875 | |
*Non-conference game; ^{†}Homecoming
