= 1975 Davidson Wildcats football team =

American college football season

1975 Davidson Wildcats football
- Conference: Southern Conference
- Record: 1–8 (0–3 SoCon)
- Head coach: Ed Farrell (2nd season)
- Home stadium: Richardson Stadium

1975 Southern Conference football standings
	Conf.					Overall
Team	W		L		T	W		L		T
Richmond $	5	–	1	–	0	5	–	6	–	0
East Carolina	4	–	2	–	0	8	–	3	–	0
Appalachian State	3	–	2	–	0	8	–	3	–	0
The Citadel	4	–	3	–	0	6	–	5	–	0
William & Mary	2	–	3	–	0	2	–	9	–	0
Furman	2	–	4	–	0	5	–	5	–	1
VMI	2	–	4	–	0	3	–	8	–	0
Davidson	0	–	3	–	0	1	–	8	–	0
$ – Conference champion

The 1975 Davidson Wildcats football team represented Davidson College as a member of the Southern Conference (SoCon) during the 1975 NCAA Division I football season. Led by second-year head coach Ed Farrell, the Wildcats compiled an overall record of 1–8 with a mark of 0–3 in conference play, placing last out of eight teams in the SoCon.

== Schedule ==
Date	Opponent	Site	Result	Attendance	Source
September 27	at VMI	Alumni Memorial Field; Lexington, VA	L 0–55	6,500	
October 4	Guilford*	Richardson Stadium; Davidson, NC	L 10–26	2,000	
October 11	Lenoir–Rhyne*	Richardson Stadium; Davidson, NC	L 14–69	3,500	
October 18	The Citadel	Richardson Stadium; Davidson, NC	L 0–44	3,800	
October 25	at Hampden–Sydney*	Hampden-Sydney, VA	L 0–14	6,000	
November 1	at Kenyon*	Gambier, OH	W 14–10	1,000	
November 8	Lehigh*	Richardson Stadium; Davidson, NC	L 19–37	3,000	
November 15	at Lafayette*	Fisher Stadium; Easton, PA	L 3–31	3,000	
November 22	at Appalachian State	Conrad Stadium; Boone, NC	L 7–52	8,691	
*Non-conference game
