= 1979 East Tennessee State Buccaneers football team =

American college football season

1979 East Tennessee State Buccaneers football
- Conference: Southern Conference
- Record: 7–4 (2–3 SoCon)
- Head coach: Jack Carlisle (2nd season)
- Offensive coordinator: Keith Daniels (1st season)
- Home stadium: Memorial Center

1979 Southern Conference football standings
	Conf.					Overall
Team	W		L		T	W		L		T
Chattanooga $	5	–	1	–	0	9	–	2	–	0
VMI	4	–	1	–	0	6	–	4	–	1
The Citadel	4	–	2	–	0	6	–	5	–	0
Furman	4	–	3	–	0	5	–	6	–	0
Appalachian State	3	–	4	–	0	3	–	8	–	0
East Tennessee State	2	–	3	–	0	7	–	4	–	0
Western Carolina	2	–	4	–	0	6	–	5	–	0
Marshall	0	–	6	–	0	1	–	10	–	0
Davidson	0	–	0	–	0	6	–	4	–	0
$ – Conference champion

The 1979 East Tennessee State Buccaneers football team was an American football team that represented East Tennessee State University as a member of the Southern Conference (SoCon) during the 1979 NCAA Division I-A football season. Led by second-year head coach Jack Carlisle, the Buccaneers compiled an overall record of 7–4, with a mark of 2–3 in conference play, and finished sixth in the SoCon.

== Schedule ==
Date	Opponent	Site	Result	Attendance	Source
September 8	James Madison*	Memorial Center; Johnson City, TN	W 31–0	7,383	
September 15	at Northern Illinois*	Huskie Stadium; DeKalb, IL	L 14–21	17,202	
September 22	Eastern Kentucky*	Memorial Center; Johnson City, TN	W 27–20	9,361	
September 29	at Furman	Sirrine Stadium; Greenville, SC	W 28–24		
October 6	at VMI	Alumni Memorial Field; Lexington, VA	L 14–24	4,600	
October 13	Chattanooga	Memorial Center; Johnson City, TN	W 35–0	12,331	
October 20	Southeastern Louisiana*	Memorial Center; Johnson City, TN	W 31–3		
October 27	Appalachian State	Memorial Center; Johnson City, TN	L 10–24	12,469	
November 3	at North Alabama*	Braly Municipal Stadium; Florence, AL	W 27–7		
November 10	Middle Tennessee*	Memorial Center; Johnson City, TN	W 52–14	10,027	
November 17	at Western Carolina	E. J. Whitmire Stadium; Cullowhee, NC	L 9–13	8,115	
*Non-conference game
