= 1980 Davidson Wildcats football team =

American college football season

1980 Davidson Wildcats football
- Conference: Southern Conference
- Record: 5–5 (0–0 SoCon)
- Head coach: Ed Farrell (7th season)
- Home stadium: Richardson Stadium

1980 Southern Conference football standings
	Conf.					Overall
Team	W		L		T	W		L		T
Furman $	7	–	0	–	0	9	–	1	–	1
Chattanooga	5	–	2	–	0	8	–	3	–	0
Appalachian State	4	–	2	–	1	6	–	4	–	1
The Citadel	3	–	2	–	0	7	–	4	–	0
Western Carolina	2	–	4	–	1	3	–	7	–	1
VMI	1	–	4	–	1	3	–	7	–	1
East Tennessee State	1	–	4	–	0	2	–	9	–	0
Marshall	0	–	5	–	1	2	–	8	–	1
Davidson	0	–	0	–	0	5	–	5	–	0
$ – Conference champion; This conference was a hybrid of I-A and I-AA programs. Davidson was classified as I-AA. The rest of the teams were I-A.

The 1980 Davidson Wildcats football team represented Davidson College as a member of the Southern Conference during the 1980 NCAA Division I-AA football season. Led by seventh-year head coach Ed Farrell, the Wildcats compiled an overall record of 5–5.

== Schedule ==
Date	Opponent	Site	Result	Attendance	Source
September 13	Springfield*	Richardson Stadium; Davidson, NC	W 42–14	5,900	
September 20	at Lafayette*	Fisher Stadium; Easton, PA	L 20–27	2,500	
September 27	at Southwestern (TN)*	Fargason Field; Memphis, TN	W 56–3	1,000	
October 4	Bucknell*	Richardson Stadium; Davidson, NC	W 21–13	4,300	
October 11	at Boston University*	Nickerson Field; Boston, MA	L 14–35	2,440	
October 18	No. 3 Lehigh*	Richardson Stadium; Davidson, NC	L 14–49	6,500	
October 25	at Hampden–Sydney*	Hundley Stadium; Hampden-Sydney, VA	W 14–7	750	
November 1	Guilford*	Richardson Stadium; Davidson, NC	W 33–20	4,800	
November 8	at Furman*	Sirrine Stadium; Greenville, SC	L 7–21	12,568	
November 15	at The Citadel*	Johnson Hagood Stadium; Charleston, SC	L 13–31	14,150	
*Non-conference game; Rankings from AP Poll released prior to the game

== Roster ==
1980 Davidson Wildcats football team roster
Players			Coaches
Offense: Pos. / # / Name / Class; QB / 7 / Kevin Attar / So	Defense: Pos. / # / Name / Class; FS / 13 / Bill Price / Jr	Special teams: Pos. / # / Name / Class; K / 14 / Gary Sims / Jr	Head coach: Ed Farrell; Coordinators/assistant coaches Legend: (C) Team captain; (S) Suspended; (I) Ineligible; Injured; Redshirt
