= 1980 Marshall Thundering Herd football team =

American college football season

1980 Marshall Thundering Herd football
- Conference: Southern Conference
- Record: 2–8–1 (0–5–1 SoCon)
- Head coach: Sonny Randle (2nd season)
- Captain: Game captains
- Home stadium: Fairfield Stadium

1980 Southern Conference football standings
	Conf.					Overall
Team	W		L		T	W		L		T
Furman $	7	–	0	–	0	9	–	1	–	1
Chattanooga	5	–	2	–	0	8	–	3	–	0
Appalachian State	4	–	2	–	1	6	–	4	–	1
The Citadel	3	–	2	–	0	7	–	4	–	0
Western Carolina	2	–	4	–	1	3	–	7	–	1
VMI	1	–	4	–	1	3	–	7	–	1
East Tennessee State	1	–	4	–	0	2	–	9	–	0
Marshall	0	–	5	–	1	2	–	8	–	1
Davidson	0	–	0	–	0	5	–	5	–	0
$ – Conference champion; This conference was a hybrid of I-A and I-AA programs. Davidson was classified as I-AA. The rest of the teams were I-A.

The 1980 Marshall Thundering Herd football team was an American football team that represented Marshall University in the Southern Conference (SoCon) during the 1980 NCAA Division I-A football season. In its second season under head coach Sonny Randle, the team compiled a 2–8–1 record (0–5–1 against conference opponents) and was outscored by a total of 245 to 127. The team played its home games at Fairfield Stadium in Huntington, West Virginia.

== Schedule ==
Date	Opponent	Site	Result	Attendance	Source
September 6	at Morehead State*	Jayne Stadium; Morehead, KY	W 35–8	10,000	
September 13	Kent State*	Fairfield Stadium; Huntington, WV	W 17–7	18,051	
September 20	at VMI	Alumni Memorial Field; Lexington, VA	L 3–17	6,800	
October 4	Appalachian State	Fairfield Stadium; Huntington, WV (rivalry)	L 6–23	14,010	
October 11	at Miami (OH)*	Miami Field; Oxford, OH	L 6–34	15,814	
October 18	Chattanooga^{†}	Fairfield Stadium; Huntington, WV	L 11–21		
October 25	at Western Carolina	E. J. Whitmire Stadium; Cullowhee, NC	T 13–13	11,850	
November 1	vs. Furman	Laidley Field; Charleston, WV	L 0–35	11,832	
November 8	at Ohio*	Peden Stadium; Athens, OH (rivalry)	L 20–28		
November 15	Toledo*	Fairfield Stadium; Huntington, WV	L 0–38		
November 22	at East Tennessee State	Memorial Center; Johnson City, TN	L 16–21	4,150	
*Non-conference game; ^{†}Homecoming
