= Ed Farrell =

American football coach and college athletic administrator

Biographical details
- Born: c. 1934

Playing career
- 1954–1955: Rutgers
- Position: End

Coaching career (HC unless noted)
- 1956: New Paltz HS (NY)
- 1958–1960: Cambridge HS (MD)
- 1961–1964: Guilderland HS (NY)
- 1965–1969: Bridgeport (assistant)
- 1970–1973: Bridgeport
- 1974–1984: Davidson

Administrative career (AD unless noted)
- 1985–1990: UNC Asheville
- 1990–1996: Chattanooga

Head coaching record
- Overall: 70–79–1 (college)
- Bowls: 2–0
- Tournaments: 0–1 (NCAA Division III playoffs)

Accomplishments and honors

Championships
- 1 EFC (1971)

Edward Farrell (born c. 1934) is an American former football coach and college athletics administrator. He served as the head football coach at University of Bridgeport in Bridgeport, Connecticut from 1970 to 1973 and Davidson College in Davidson, North Carolina from 1974 to 1984. Farrell was also the athletic director at the University of North Carolina at Asheville from 1985 to 1990 and the University of Tennessee at Chattanooga from 1990 to 1996.

A native of Brewster, New York, Farrell attended Rutgers University, where he played football as an end. He began his coaching career in 1956 as head football coach at New Paltz High School in New Paltz, New York. After a year in the United States Army, he returned to coaching in 1958 at Cambridge High School in Cambridge, Maryland. He served as head football coach at Cambridge from 1958 to 1960 and then at Guilderland High School in Guilderland, New York from 1961 to 1964. Farrell joined the football coaching staff at Bridgeport as an assistant in 1965.

== Head coaching record ==
=== College ===
| Year | Team | Overall | Conference | Standing | Bowl/playoffs |
|---|---|---|---|---|---|
Bridgeport Purple Knights (Eastern Football Conference) (1970–1971)
| 1970 | Bridgeport | 4–6 | 1–3 | 4th | |
| 1971 | Bridgeport | 10–1 | 4–0 | 1st | W Knute Rockne Bowl |
Bridgeport Purple Knights (NCAA College Division / NCAA Division III independent) (1972–1973)
| 1972 | Bridgeport | 11–0 | | | W Knute Rockne Bowl |
| 1973 | Bridgeport | 9–2 | | | L NCAA Division III Semifinal |
| Bridgeport: | | 34–9 | 5–3 | | |
Davidson Wildcats (Southern Conference) (1974–1976)
| 1974 | Davidson | 2–7 | 0–3 | 8th | |
| 1975 | Davidson | 1–8 | 0–3 | 8th | |
| 1976 | Davidson | 2–6–1 | 0–0 | NA | |
| 1977 | Davidson | 4–6 | 0–0 | NA | |
| 1978 | Davidson | 5–5 | 0–0 | NA | |
| 1979 | Davidson | 6–4 | 0–0 | NA | |
| 1980 | Davidson | 5–5 | 0–0 | NA | |
| 1981 | Davidson | 4–6 | 0–0 | NA | |
| 1982 | Davidson | 3–7 | 0–0 | NA | |
| 1983 | Davidson | 2–8 | 0–5 | 9th | |
| 1984 | Davidson | 2–8 | 0–5 | 9th | |
| Davidson: | | 36–70–1 | 0–16 | | |
| Total: | | 70–79–1 | | | |
National championship Conference title Conference division title or championship game berth
