= 1982 VMI Keydets football team =

American college football season

1982 VMI Keydets football
- Conference: Southern Conference
- Record: 5–6 (2–3 SoCon)
- Head coach: Bob Thalman (12th season)
- Home stadium: Alumni Memorial Field

1982 Southern Conference football standings
	Conf.					Overall
Team	W		L		T	W		L		T
No. 6 Furman $^	6	–	1	–	0	9	–	3	–	0
No. 17 Chattanooga	5	–	1	–	0	7	–	4	–	0
Western Carolina	4	–	2	–	0	6	–	5	–	0
The Citadel	3	–	4	–	0	5	–	6	–	0
Appalachian State	3	–	4	–	0	4	–	7	–	0
VMI	2	–	3	–	0	5	–	6	–	0
East Tennessee State	2	–	5	–	0	2	–	9	–	0
Marshall	1	–	6	–	0	3	–	7	–	0
Davidson	0	–	0	–	0	3	–	7	–	0
$ – Conference champion; ^ – NCAA Division I-AA playoff participant; Rankings from NCAA Division I-AA Football Committee poll

The 1982 VMI Keydets football team was an American football team that represented the Virginia Military Institute (VMI) as a member of the Southern Conference (SoCon) during the 1982 NCAA Division I-AA football season. In their 12th year under head coach Bob Thalman, the team compiled an overall record of 5–6 with a mark of 2–3 in conference play, placing sixth in the SoCon.

== Schedule ==
Date	Time	Opponent	Site	Result	Attendance	Source
September 11		at East Tennessee State	Memorial Center; Johnson City, TN	W 21–3	7,045	
September 18		at William & Mary*	Cary Field; Williamsburg, VA (rivalry)	L 12–24	14,180	
September 25		UCF*	Alumni Memorial Field; Lexington, VA	W 69–0	6,100	
October 2		at Furman	Paladin Stadium; Greenville, SC	L 3–38	13,187	
October 9		at The Citadel	Johnson Hagood Stadium; Charleston, SC (rivalry)	L 7–21	17,200	
October 16		No. T–10 James Madison*	Alumni Memorial Field; Lexington, VA	W 35–7	9,357	
October 23		at Richmond*	City Stadium; Richmond, VA (Tobacco Bowl, rivalry)	W 14–0	12,197	
October 30		at Virginia*	Scott Stadium; Charlottesville, VA	L 0–37	29,456	
November 6	2:00 p.m.	Marshall	Alumni Memorial Field; Lexington, VA	L 20–22	5,200	
November 13		Appalachian State	Alumni Memorial Field; Lexington, VA	W 31–14	3,700	
November 20		at Virginia Tech*	Foreman Field; Norfolk, VA (Oyster Bowl, rivalry)	L 3–14	25,600	
*Non-conference game; Rankings from NCAA Division I-AA Football Committee Poll released prior to the game; All times are in Eastern time
