= 1982 Chattanooga Moccasins football team =

American college football season

1982 Chattanooga Moccasins football
- Conference: Southern Conference
- Record: 7–4 (5–1 SoCon)
- Head coach: Bill Oliver (3rd season)
- Captain: Game captains
- Home stadium: Chamberlain Field

1982 Southern Conference football standings
	Conf.					Overall
Team	W		L		T	W		L		T
No. 6 Furman $^	6	–	1	–	0	9	–	3	–	0
No. 17 Chattanooga	5	–	1	–	0	7	–	4	–	0
Western Carolina	4	–	2	–	0	6	–	5	–	0
The Citadel	3	–	4	–	0	5	–	6	–	0
Appalachian State	3	–	4	–	0	4	–	7	–	0
VMI	2	–	3	–	0	5	–	6	–	0
East Tennessee State	2	–	5	–	0	2	–	9	–	0
Marshall	1	–	6	–	0	3	–	7	–	0
Davidson	0	–	0	–	0	3	–	7	–	0
$ – Conference champion; ^ – NCAA Division I-AA playoff participant; Rankings from NCAA Division I-AA Football Committee poll

The 1982 Chattanooga Moccasins football team represented the University of Tennessee at Chattanooga as a member of the Southern Conference (SoCon) in the 1982 NCAA Division I-AA football season. The Moccasins were led by third-year head coach Bill Oliver and played their home games at Chamberlain Field. They finished the season 7–4 overall and 5–1 in SoCon play to place in second.

== Schedule ==
Date	Opponent	Rank	Site	Result	Attendance	Source
September 11	Troy State*		Chamberlain Field; Chattanooga, TN	W 24–10	10,002	
September 18	at Arkansas State*		Indian Stadium; Jonesboro, AR	L 12–13	13,764	
September 25	Furman	No. 20	Chamberlain Field; Chattanooga, TN	W 16–13	6,547	
October 2	at Marshall		Fairfield Stadium; Huntington, WV	W 17–7	12,224	
October 9	East Tennessee State^{†}	No. 19	Chamberlain Field; Chattanooga, TN	W 27–6	9,721	
October 16	at No. 6 Tennessee State*	No. 15	Hale Stadium; Nashville, TN	L 21–27	18,200	
October 23	at No. 3 (D-II) Jacksonville State*	No. 19	Paul Snow Stadium; Jacksonville, AL	W 28–0	12,500	
October 30	Western Carolina	No. 12	Chamberlain Field; Chattanooga, TN	L 0–20	8,004	
November 6	Appalachian State	No. 19	Chamberlain Field; Chattanooga, TN	W 50–7	8,767	
November 13	at The Citadel	No. 19	Johnson Hagood Stadium; Charleston, SC	W 24–7	18,480	
November 20	at Vanderbilt*	No. 13	Vanderbilt Stadium; Nashville, TN	L 16–27	36,126	
*Non-conference game; ^{†}Homecoming; Rankings from NCAA Division I-AA Football Committee Poll released prior to the game
