= 1975 Appalachian State Mountaineers football team =

American college football season

1975 Appalachian State Mountaineers football
- Conference: Southern Conference
- Record: 8–3 (3–2 SoCon)
- Head coach: Jim Brakefield (5th season)
- Home stadium: Conrad Stadium

1975 Southern Conference football standings
	Conf.					Overall
Team	W		L		T	W		L		T
Richmond $	5	–	1	–	0	5	–	6	–	0
East Carolina	4	–	2	–	0	8	–	3	–	0
Appalachian State	3	–	2	–	0	8	–	3	–	0
The Citadel	4	–	3	–	0	6	–	5	–	0
William & Mary	2	–	3	–	0	2	–	9	–	0
Furman	2	–	4	–	0	5	–	5	–	1
VMI	2	–	4	–	0	3	–	8	–	0
Davidson	0	–	3	–	0	1	–	8	–	0
$ – Conference champion

The 1975 Appalachian State Mountaineers football team was an American football team that represented Appalachian State University as a member of the Southern Conference (SoCon) during the 1975 NCAA Division I football season. In their fifth year under head coach Jim Brakefield, the Mountaineers compiled an overall record of 8–3 with a mark of 3–2 in conference play, and finished third in the SoCon.

== Schedule ==
Date	Opponent	Site	Result	Attendance	Source
September 13	East Carolina	Conrad Stadium; Boone, NC	W 41–25	13,000	
September 20	at Wake Forest*	Groves Stadium; Winston-Salem, NC	W 19–17	24,300	
September 27	at Furman	Sirrine Stadium; Greenville, SC	L 23–30	12,000	
October 4	Tennessee Tech*	Conrad Stadium; Boone, NC	W 17–10	10,892	
October 11	at East Tennessee State*	Memorial Stadium; Johnson City, TN	W 44–21	8,172	
October 18	Lenoir Rhyne*	Conrad Stadium; Boone, NC	W 52–28	13,017	
October 25	Richmond	Conrad Stadium; Boone, NC	L 17–24	14,195	
November 1	at The Citadel	Johnson Hagood Stadium; Charleston, SC	W 22–17	18,485	
November 8	at South Carolina*	Williams–Brice Stadium; Columbia, SC	W 39–34	47,489	
November 15	at Western Carolina*	Whitmire Stadium; Cullowhee, NC (rivalry)	L 11–20	10,250	
November 22	Davidson	Conrad Stadium; Boone, NC	W 52–7	8,691	
*Non-conference game
