= 1980 Furman Paladins football team =

American college football season

1980 Furman Paladins football

SoCon champion
- Conference: Southern Conference
- Record: 9–1–1 (7–0 SoCon)
- Head coach: Dick Sheridan (3rd season)
- Captains: Jeff Snipes; Kevin Morgan; Steve Bishop
- Home stadium: Sirrine Stadium

1980 Southern Conference football standings
	Conf.					Overall
Team	W		L		T	W		L		T
Furman $	7	–	0	–	0	9	–	1	–	1
Chattanooga	5	–	2	–	0	8	–	3	–	0
Appalachian State	4	–	2	–	1	6	–	4	–	1
The Citadel	3	–	2	–	0	7	–	4	–	0
Western Carolina	2	–	4	–	1	3	–	7	–	1
VMI	1	–	4	–	1	3	–	7	–	1
East Tennessee State	1	–	4	–	0	2	–	9	–	0
Marshall	0	–	5	–	1	2	–	8	–	1
Davidson	0	–	0	–	0	5	–	5	–	0
$ – Conference champion; This conference was a hybrid of I-A and I-AA programs. Davidson was classified as I-AA. The rest of the teams were I-A.

The 1980 Furman Paladins football team was an American football team that represented Furman University as a member of the Southern Conference (SoCon) during the 1980 NCAA Division I-A football season. In their third year under head coach Dick Sheridan, the Paladins compiled an overall record of 9–1–1 with a conference mark of 7–0, winning the SoCon title.

== Schedule ==
Date	Opponent	Site	Result	Attendance	Source
September 6	at No. 14 North Carolina*	Kenan Memorial Stadium; Chapel Hill, NC	L 13–35	50,100	
September 13	Presbyterian*	Sirrine Stadium; Greenville, SC	W 28–7	10,847	
September 20	at Western Carolina	Whitmire Stadium; Cullowhee, NC	W 28–14	11,150	
September 27	VMI	Sirrine Stadium; Greenville, SC	W 21–16	12,112	
October 4	at Chattanooga	Chamberlain Field; Chattanooga, TN	W 42-28	11,000	
October 11	at East Tennessee State	Memorial Center; Johnson City, TN	W 33–21	8,231	
October 25	at Appalachian State	Conrad Stadium; Boone, NC	W 21–20	14,200	
November 1	at Marshall	Laidley Field; Charleston, WV	W 35–0	11,832	
November 8	Davidson*	Sirrine Stadium; Greenville, SC	W 21–7	12,568	
November 15	Wofford*	Sirrine Stadium; Greenville, SC (rivalry)	T 14–14	13,647	
November 22	The Citadel	Sirrine Stadium; Greenville, SC (rivalry)	W 28–15	17,665	
*Non-conference game; Rankings from AP Poll released prior to the game
