= 1979 Appalachian State Mountaineers football team =

American college football season

1979 Appalachian State Mountaineers football
- Conference: Southern Conference
- Record: 3–8 (3–4 SoCon)
- Head coach: Jim Brakefield (9th season)
- Home stadium: Conrad Stadium

1979 Southern Conference football standings
	Conf.					Overall
Team	W		L		T	W		L		T
Chattanooga $	5	–	1	–	0	9	–	2	–	0
VMI	4	–	1	–	0	6	–	4	–	1
The Citadel	4	–	2	–	0	6	–	5	–	0
Furman	4	–	3	–	0	5	–	6	–	0
Appalachian State	3	–	4	–	0	3	–	8	–	0
East Tennessee State	2	–	3	–	0	7	–	4	–	0
Western Carolina	2	–	4	–	0	6	–	5	–	0
Marshall	0	–	6	–	0	1	–	10	–	0
Davidson	0	–	0	–	0	6	–	4	–	0
$ – Conference champion

The 1979 Appalachian State Mountaineers football team was an American football team that represented Appalachian State University as a member of the Southern Conference (SoCon) during the 1979 NCAA Division I-A football season. In their ninth year under head coach Jim Brakefield, the Mountaineers compiled an overall record of 3–8 with a mark of 3–4 in conference play, and finished fifth in the SoCon. After their victory over Marshall in their season finale, Brakefield resigned as head coach of the Mountaineers.

Split end Rick Beasley led all major-college players with 74 receptions and 1,205 receiving yards. At the end of the 1979 season, he led the voting for the All-Southern Conference football team. In July 1980, Beasley was named the athlete of the year in the Southern Conference.

== Schedule ==
Date	Opponent	Site	Result	Attendance	Source
September 8	at Wake Forest*	Groves Stadium; Winston-Salem, NC	L 23–30	26,500	
September 15	at Virginia Tech*	Lane Stadium; Blacksburg, VA	L 32–41	30,300	
September 22	Western Carolina	Conrad Stadium; Boone, NC (rivalry)	W 35–27	17,124	
September 29	at The Citadel	Johnson Hagood Stadium; Charleston, SC	L 23–24	17,850	
October 6	Chattanooga	Conrad Stadium; Boone, NC	L 21–24	16,255	
October 13	VMI	Conrad Stadium; Boone, NC	L 22–27	7,624	
October 20	at Furman	Sirrine Stadium; Greenville, SC	L 17–31	13,287	
October 27	at East Tennessee State	Memorial Center; Johnson City, TN	W 24–10	12,469	
November 3	East Carolina*	Conrad Stadium; Boone, NC	L 21–38	13,815	
November 10	William & Mary*	Conrad Stadium; Boone, NC	L 0–9	4,820	
November 17	Marshall	Conrad Stadium; Boone, NC (rivalry)	W 45–7	8,875	
*Non-conference game
