= 1982 Davidson Wildcats football team =

American college football season

1982 Davidson Wildcats football
- Conference: Southern Conference
- Record: 3–7 (0–0 SoCon)
- Head coach: Ed Farrell (9th season)
- Home stadium: Richardson Stadium

1982 Southern Conference football standings
	Conf.					Overall
Team	W		L		T	W		L		T
No. 6 Furman $^	6	–	1	–	0	9	–	3	–	0
No. 17 Chattanooga	5	–	1	–	0	7	–	4	–	0
Western Carolina	4	–	2	–	0	6	–	5	–	0
The Citadel	3	–	4	–	0	5	–	6	–	0
Appalachian State	3	–	4	–	0	4	–	7	–	0
VMI	2	–	3	–	0	5	–	6	–	0
East Tennessee State	2	–	5	–	0	2	–	9	–	0
Marshall	1	–	6	–	0	3	–	7	–	0
Davidson	0	–	0	–	0	3	–	7	–	0
$ – Conference champion; ^ – NCAA Division I-AA playoff participant; Rankings from NCAA Division I-AA Football Committee poll

The 1982 Davidson Wildcats football team represented Davidson College as a member of the Southern Conference during the 1982 NCAA Division I-AA football season. Led by ninth-year head coach Ed Farrell, the Wildcats compiled an overall record of 3–7.

== Schedule ==
Date	Opponent	Site	Result	Attendance	Source
September 11	Wofford*	Richardson Stadium; Davidson, NC	L 0–54	4,100	
September 18	Georgetown (KY)*	Richardson Stadium; Davidson, NC	W 33–21	1,500	
September 25	Newberry*	Richardson Stadium; Davidson, NC	L 7–8	2,600	
October 2	No. 9 James Madison*	Richardson Stadium; Davidson, NC	L 7–35	2,800	
October 9	Guilford*^{†}	Richardson Stadium; Davidson, NC	W 35–22	4,300	
October 16	at South Carolina State*	State College Stadium; Orangeburg, SC	L 7–24		
October 23	at Lafayette*	Fisher Stadium; Easton, PA	L 14–49	7,500	
October 30	at No. 11 Furman*	Paladin Stadium; Greenville, SC	L 14–63	12,136	
November 6	Bucknell*	Richardson Stadium; Davidson, NC	L 0–21	2,200	
November 13	at Catawba*	Shuford Stadium; Salisbury, NC	W 13–12	4,801	
*Non-conference game; ^{†}Homecoming; Rankings from NCAA Division I-AA Football Committee Poll released prior to the game
