= 1979 Western Carolina Catamounts football team =

American college football season

1979 Western Carolina Catamounts football
- Conference: Southern Conference
- Record: 6–5 (2–4 SoCon)
- Head coach: Bob Waters (11th season)
- Home stadium: E. J. Whitmire Stadium

1979 Southern Conference football standings
	Conf.					Overall
Team	W		L		T	W		L		T
Chattanooga $	5	–	1	–	0	9	–	2	–	0
VMI	4	–	1	–	0	6	–	4	–	1
The Citadel	4	–	2	–	0	6	–	5	–	0
Furman	4	–	3	–	0	5	–	6	–	0
Appalachian State	3	–	4	–	0	3	–	8	–	0
East Tennessee State	2	–	3	–	0	7	–	4	–	0
Western Carolina	2	–	4	–	0	6	–	5	–	0
Marshall	0	–	6	–	0	1	–	10	–	0
Davidson	0	–	0	–	0	6	–	4	–	0
$ – Conference champion

The 1979 Western Carolina Catamounts team was an American football team that represented Western Carolina University as a member of the Southern Conference (SoCon) during the 1979 NCAA Division I-A football season. In their 11th year under head coach Bob Waters, the team compiled an overall record of 6–5, with a mark of 2–4 in conference play, and finished in seventh place in the SoCon.

== Schedule ==
Date	Opponent	Site	Result	Attendance	Source
September 1	at East Carolina*	Ficklen Memorial Stadium; Greenville, NC	L 6–31	25,500	
September 8	Tennessee Tech*	E. J. Whitmire Stadium; Cullowhee, NC	W 24–7	8,650	
September 15	at Marshall	Fairfield Stadium; Huntington, WV	W 24–0		
September 22	at Appalachian State	Conrad Stadium; Boone, NC (rivalry)	L 27–35	17,124	
September 29	Elon*	E. J. Whitmire Stadium; Cullowhee, NC	W 20–7	5,712	
October 6	at The Citadel	Johnson Hagood Stadium; Charleston, SC	L 19–21	14,750	
October 20	Wofford*	E. J. Whitmire Stadium; Cullowhee, NC	W 56–21	6,725	
October 27	Lenoir–Rhyne*	E. J. Whitmire Stadium; Cullowhee, NC	W 42–6		
November 3	Chattanooga	E. J. Whitmire Stadium; Cullowhee, NC	L 35–42	7,109	
November 10	at Furman	Sirrine Stadium; Greenville, SC	L 14–23	8,854	
November 17	East Tennessee State	E. J. Whitmire Stadium; Cullowhee, NC	W 13–9	8,115	
*Non-conference game
