= 1982 East Tennessee State Buccaneers football team =

American college football season

1982 East Tennessee State Buccaneers football
- Conference: Southern Conference
- Record: 2–9 (2–5 SoCon)
- Head coach: Jack Carlisle (5th season)
- Home stadium: Memorial Center

1982 Southern Conference football standings
	Conf.					Overall
Team	W		L		T	W		L		T
No. 6 Furman $^	6	–	1	–	0	9	–	3	–	0
No. 17 Chattanooga	5	–	1	–	0	7	–	4	–	0
Western Carolina	4	–	2	–	0	6	–	5	–	0
The Citadel	3	–	4	–	0	5	–	6	–	0
Appalachian State	3	–	4	–	0	4	–	7	–	0
VMI	2	–	3	–	0	5	–	6	–	0
East Tennessee State	2	–	5	–	0	2	–	9	–	0
Marshall	1	–	6	–	0	3	–	7	–	0
Davidson	0	–	0	–	0	3	–	7	–	0
$ – Conference champion; ^ – NCAA Division I-AA playoff participant; Rankings from NCAA Division I-AA Football Committee poll

The 1982 East Tennessee State Buccaneers football team was an American football team that represented East Tennessee State University as a member of the Southern Conference (SoCon) during the 1982 NCAA Division I-AA football season. Led by fifth-year head coach Jack Carlisle, the Buccaneers compiled and overall record of 2–9, with a mark of 2–5 in conference play, and finished seventh in the SoCon.

== Schedule ==
Date	Time	Opponent	Site	Result	Attendance	Source
September 4		at Tennessee Tech*	Tucker Stadium; Cookeville, TN	L 0–14	8,170	
September 11		VMI	Memorial Center; Johnson City, TN	L 3–21	7,045	
September 18		at East Carolina*	Ficklen Memorial Stadium; Greenville, NC	L 0–30	22,127	
September 25		at James Madison*	JMU Stadium; Harrisonburg, VA	L 10–15	13,500	
October 2		Western Carolina	Memorial Center; Johnson City, TN	L 25–27	6,500	
October 9		at No. 19 Chattanooga	Chamberlain Field; Chattanooga, TN	L 6–27	9,721	
October 16		at The Citadel	Johnson Hagood Stadium; Charleston, SC	W 3–0	11,650	
October 23		No. T–15 Furman	Memorial Center; Johnson City, TN	L 15–20	7,500	
October 30		at Appalachian State	Conrad Stadium; Boone, NC	L 13–29	16,150	
November 13		Wofford*	Memorial Center; Johnson City, TN	L 20–34	4,253	
November 20	7:30 p.m.	Marshall	Memorial Center; Johnson City, TN	W 28–0	3,600	
*Non-conference game; Rankings from NCAA Division I-AA Football Committee Poll released prior to the game; All times are in Eastern time
