= 1981 Chattanooga Moccasins football team =

American college football season

1981 Chattanooga Moccasins football
- Conference: Southern Conference
- Record: 7–3–1 (3–2–1 SoCon)
- Head coach: Bill Oliver (2nd season)
- Captain: Game captains
- Home stadium: Chamberlain Field

1981 Southern Conference football standings
	Conf.					Overall
Team	W		L		T	W		L		T
Furman $	5	–	2	–	0	8	–	3	–	0
VMI	3	–	1	–	1	6	–	3	–	1
East Tennessee State	4	–	2	–	0	6	–	5	–	0
Chattanooga	3	–	2	–	1	7	–	3	–	1
The Citadel	3	–	2	–	1	7	–	3	–	1
Western Carolina	3	–	4	–	0	4	–	7	–	0
Appalachian State	1	–	5	–	1	3	–	7	–	1
Marshall	1	–	5	–	0	2	–	9	–	0
Davidson	0	–	0	–	0	4	–	6	–	0
$ – Conference champion; This conference was a hybrid of I-AA and I-A programs. Davidson was classified as I-AA. The rest of the teams were I-A.

The 1981 Chattanooga Moccasins football team represented the University of Tennessee at Chattanooga as a member of the Southern Conference (SoCon) in the 1981 NCAA Division I-A football season. The Moccasins were led by second-year head coach Bill Oliver and played their home games at Charmerlain Field. They finished the season 7–3–1 overall and 3–2–1 in SoCon play to tie for fourth place.

== Schedule ==
Date	Opponent	Site	Result	Attendance	Source
September 12	Middle Tennessee*	Chamberlain Field; Chattanooga, TN	W 42–19	10,800	
September 19	at Appalachian State	Conrad Stadium; Boone, NC	L 14–31	16,300	
September 26	Jacksonville State*	Chamberlain Field; Chattanooga, TN	W 10–3	10,300	
October 3	at Furman	Paladin Stadium; Greenville, SC	W 31–28	12,525	
October 10	Marshall	Chamberlain Field; Chattanooga, TN	W 20–0		
October 17	at Arkansas State*	Indian Stadium; Jonesboro, AR	W 3–2	5,000	
October 24	at Western Carolina	Whitmire Stadium; Cullowhee, NC	L 10–24		
October 31	at East Tennessee State	Memorial Center; Johnson City, TN	W 17–0		
November 7	The Citadel^{†}	Chamberlain Field; Chattanooga, TN	T 28–28	10,132	
November 14	Tennessee State*	Chamberlain Field; Chattanooga, TN	W 28–9	12,003	
November 21	at Vanderbilt*	Dudley Field; Nashville, TN	L 14–28	26,241	
*Non-conference game; ^{†}Homecoming
