= Jim Tait =

American football player, coach, and administrator (1935–2011)

Biographical details
- Born: November 6, 1935
- Died: May 20, 2011 (aged 75); Richmond, Virginia, U.S.

Playing career
- 1955–1956: Mississippi State
- Position: Halfback

Coaching career (HC unless noted)
- 1957: Mississippi State (asst. fr.)
- 1960: Mississippi State (asst. fr.)
- 1961–1963: Meridian HS (MS) (assistant)
- 1964–1965: Meridian HS (MS)
- 1966–1973: Richmond (assistant)
- 1974–1979: Richmond

Head coaching record
- Overall: 21–44 (college); 9–9–1 (high school)

Accomplishments and honors

Championships
- 1 SoCon (1975)

Jim Tait (November 6, 1935 – May 20, 2011) was an American football player, coach, and college athletics administrator. He was head football coach at the University of Richmond from 1974 until 1979, compiling a record of 21–44. In 1975, Richmond won the Southern Conference championship. Tait was fired after the 1979 season, and then hired by Virginia Tech as an assistant athletic director under Bill Dooley. Tait was a native of New Rochelle, New York. He played college football at Mississippi State University and began his coaching career there in 1957. He died on May 20, 2011, in Richmond, Virginia.

== Head coaching record ==
=== College ===
Year	Team	Overall	Conference	Standing	Bowl/playoffs
Richmond Spiders (Southern Conference) (1974–1975)
1974	Richmond	5–5	3–3	T–3rd	
1975	Richmond	5–6	5–1	1st	
Richmond Spiders (NCAA Division I/I-A independent) (1976–1979)
1976	Richmond	5–6			
1977	Richmond	3–8			
1978	Richmond	3–8			
1979	Richmond	0–11			
Richmond:		21–44	8–4		
Total:		21–44			
