= 1980 East Tennessee State Buccaneers football team =

American college football season

1980 East Tennessee State Buccaneers football
- Conference: Southern Conference
- Record: 2–9 (1–4 SoCon)
- Head coach: Jack Carlisle (3rd season)
- Home stadium: Memorial Center

1980 Southern Conference football standings
	Conf.					Overall
Team	W		L		T	W		L		T
Furman $	7	–	0	–	0	9	–	1	–	1
Chattanooga	5	–	2	–	0	8	–	3	–	0
Appalachian State	4	–	2	–	1	6	–	4	–	1
The Citadel	3	–	2	–	0	7	–	4	–	0
Western Carolina	2	–	4	–	1	3	–	7	–	1
VMI	1	–	4	–	1	3	–	7	–	1
East Tennessee State	1	–	4	–	0	2	–	9	–	0
Marshall	0	–	5	–	1	2	–	8	–	1
Davidson	0	–	0	–	0	5	–	5	–	0
$ – Conference champion; This conference was a hybrid of I-A and I-AA programs. Davidson was classified as I-AA. The rest of the teams were I-A.

The 1980 East Tennessee State Buccaneers football team was an American football team that represented East Tennessee State University as a member of the Southern Conference (SoCon) during the 1980 NCAA Division I-A football season. Led by third-year head coach Jack Carlisle, the Buccaneers compiled and overall record of 2–9, with a mark of 1–4 in conference play, placing seventh in the SoCon.

== Schedule ==
Date	Opponent	Site	Result	Attendance	Source
September 6	Wofford*	Memorial Center; Johnson City, TN	L 9–16	7,477	
September 13	at Virginia Tech*	Lane Stadium; Blacksburg, VA	L 7–35	27,500	
September 20	at Southeastern Louisiana*	Strawberry Stadium; Hammond, LA	L 3–7	8,500	
September 27	at Appalachian State	Conrad Stadium; Boone, NC	L 15–42	14,160	
October 4	Louisiana Tech*	Memorial Center; Johnson City, TN	L 3–7	6,489	
October 11	Furman	Memorial Center; Johnson City, TN	L 21–33	8,231	
October 18	at Eastern Kentucky*	Hanger Field; Richmond, KY	L 6–25	9,500	
October 25	at Chattanooga	Chamberlain Field; Chattanooga, TN	L 14–26	10,000	
November 8	at James Madison*	Madison Stadium; Harrisonburg, VA	W 28–23	11,800	
November 15	Western Carolina	Memorial Center; Johnson City, TN	L 17–20	5,128	
November 22	Marshall	Memorial Center; Johnson City, TN	W 21–16	4,150	
*Non-conference game
