= 1981 Marshall Thundering Herd football team =

American college football season

1981 Marshall Thundering Herd football
- Conference: Southern Conference
- Record: 2–9 (1–5 SoCon)
- Head coach: Sonny Randle (3rd season)
- Captain: Game captains
- Home stadium: Fairfield Stadium

1981 Southern Conference football standings
	Conf.					Overall
Team	W		L		T	W		L		T
Furman $	5	–	2	–	0	8	–	3	–	0
VMI	3	–	1	–	1	6	–	3	–	1
East Tennessee State	4	–	2	–	0	6	–	5	–	0
Chattanooga	3	–	2	–	1	7	–	3	–	1
The Citadel	3	–	2	–	1	7	–	3	–	1
Western Carolina	3	–	4	–	0	4	–	7	–	0
Appalachian State	1	–	5	–	1	3	–	7	–	1
Marshall	1	–	5	–	0	2	–	9	–	0
Davidson	0	–	0	–	0	4	–	6	–	0
$ – Conference champion; This conference was a hybrid of I-AA and I-A programs. Davidson was classified as I-AA. The rest of the teams were I-A.

The 1981 Marshall Thundering Herd football team was an American football team that represented Marshall University in the Southern Conference (SoCon) during the 1981 NCAA Division I-A football season. In its third season under head coach Sonny Randle, the team compiled a 2–9 record (1–5 against conference opponents) and was outscored by a total of 284 to 94. The team played its home games at Fairfield Stadium in Huntington, West Virginia.

== Schedule ==
Date	Opponent	Site	Result	Attendance	Source
September 12	Morehead State*	Fairfield Stadium; Huntington, WV	W 20–17	18,212	
September 19	at Western Michigan*	Waldo Stadium; Kalamazoo, MI	L 3–14		
September 26	East Tennessee State	Fairfield Stadium; Huntington, WV	L 0–14	15,625	
October 3	at Louisville*	Cardinal Stadium; Louisville, KY	L 0–36		
October 10	at Chattanooga	Chamberlain Field; Chattanooga, TN	L 0–20		
October 17	at William & Mary*	Cary Field; Williamsburg, VA	L 7–38	8,000	
October 24	VMI^{†}	Fairfield Stadium; Huntington, WV	L 16–20	13,440	
October 31	at Furman	Paladin Stadium; Greenville, SC	L 3–35	10,811	
November 7	at Appalachian State	Kidd Brewer Stadium; Boone, NC (rivalry)	W 17–10	8,280	
November 14	Western Carolina	Fairfield Stadium; Huntington, WV	L 28–38		
November 21	Indiana State*	Fairfield Stadium; Huntington, WV	L 0–42		
*Non-conference game; ^{†}Homecoming

== Roster ==
1981 Marshall Thundering Herd football team roster
Players
Coaches
Offense

Pos.	#	Name	Class

Defense

Pos.	#	Name	Class
LB	42	Terry Echols	So
S	1	Carl Lee	Jr

Special teams

Pos.	#	Name	Class

Head coach

- Sonny Randle

Coordinators/assistant coaches

Legend

- (C) Team captain
- (S) Suspended
- (I) Ineligible
- Injured
- Redshirt
