= 1981 VMI Keydets football team =

American college football season

1981 VMI Keydets football
- Conference: Southern Conference
- Record: 6–3–1 (3–1–1 SoCon)
- Head coach: Bob Thalman (11th season)
- Home stadium: Alumni Memorial Field

1981 Southern Conference football standings
| | Conf. | | | | | Overall |
| Team | W | | L | | T | W | | L | | T |
|---|---|---|---|---|---|---|---|---|---|---|
| Furman $ | 5 | – | 2 | – | 0 | 8 | – | 3 | – | 0 |
| VMI | 3 | – | 1 | – | 1 | 6 | – | 3 | – | 1 |
| East Tennessee State | 4 | – | 2 | – | 0 | 6 | – | 5 | – | 0 |
| Chattanooga | 3 | – | 2 | – | 1 | 7 | – | 3 | – | 1 |
| The Citadel | 3 | – | 2 | – | 1 | 7 | – | 3 | – | 1 |
| Western Carolina | 3 | – | 4 | – | 0 | 4 | – | 7 | – | 0 |
| Appalachian State | 1 | – | 5 | – | 1 | 3 | – | 7 | – | 1 |
| Marshall | 1 | – | 5 | – | 0 | 2 | – | 9 | – | 0 |
| Davidson | 0 | – | 0 | – | 0 | 4 | – | 6 | – | 0 |
$ – Conference champion; This conference was a hybrid of I-AA and I-A programs. Davidson was classified as I-AA. The rest of the teams were I-A.

The 1981 VMI Keydets football team was an American football team that represented the Virginia Military Institute (VMI) as a member of the Southern Conference (SoCon) during the 1981 NCAA Division I-A football season. In their 11th year under head coach Bob Thalman, the team compiled an overall record of 6–3–1 with a mark of 3–1–1 in conference play, placing second in the SoCon.

== Schedule ==
| Date | Opponent | Site | Result | Attendance | Source |
|---|---|---|---|---|---|
| September 12 | Western Carolina | Alumni Memorial Field; Lexington, VA | W 21–14 | | |
| September 19 | at Army* | Michie Stadium; West Point, NY | W 14–7 | 29,970 | |
| September 26 | William & Mary* | Alumni Memorial Field; Lexington, VA (rivalry) | W 31–14 | 8,250 | |
| October 10 | vs. The Citadel | Foreman Field; Norfolk, VA (Oyster Bowl, rivalry) | W 14–0 | 20,000 | |
| October 17 | at Appalachian State | Conrad Stadium; Boone, NC | T 14–14 | 18,830 | |
| October 24 | at Marshall | Fairfield Stadium; Huntington, WV | W 20–16 | 13,440 | |
| October 31 | at Virginia* | Scott Stadium; Charlottesville, VA | L 10–13 | 25,119 | |
| November 7 | Richmond* | Alumni Memorial Field; Lexington, VA (rivalry) | L 14–45 | 7,800 | |
| November 14 | Furman | Alumni Memorial Field; Lexington, VA | L 21–33 | 5,100 | |
| November 21 | at Virginia Tech* | Lane Stadium; Blacksburg, VA (rivalry) | W 6–0 | 21,100 | |
*Non-conference game
