= 1980 Western Carolina Catamounts football team =

American college football season

1980 Western Carolina Catamounts football
- Conference: Southern Conference
- Record: 3–7–1 (2–4–1 SoCon)
- Head coach: Bob Waters (12th season)
- Home stadium: E. J. Whitmire Stadium

1980 Southern Conference football standings
	Conf.					Overall
Team	W		L		T	W		L		T
Furman $	7	–	0	–	0	9	–	1	–	1
Chattanooga	5	–	2	–	0	8	–	3	–	0
Appalachian State	4	–	2	–	1	6	–	4	–	1
The Citadel	3	–	2	–	0	7	–	4	–	0
Western Carolina	2	–	4	–	1	3	–	7	–	1
VMI	1	–	4	–	1	3	–	7	–	1
East Tennessee State	1	–	4	–	0	2	–	9	–	0
Marshall	0	–	5	–	1	2	–	8	–	1
Davidson	0	–	0	–	0	5	–	5	–	0
$ – Conference champion; This conference was a hybrid of I-A and I-AA programs. Davidson was classified as I-AA. The rest of the teams were I-A.

The 1980 Western Carolina Catamounts team was an American football team that represented Western Carolina University as a member of the Southern Conference (SoCon) during the 1980 NCAA Division I-A football season. In their 12th year under head coach Bob Waters, the team compiled an overall record of 3–7–1, with a mark of 2–4–1 in conference play, finishing in fifth place in the SoCon.

== Schedule ==
Date	Opponent	Site	Result	Attendance	Source
September 6	VMI	E. J. Whitmire Stadium; Cullowhee, NC	W 16–14	10,638	
September 13	at Tennessee Tech*	Overall Field; Cookeville, TN	L 10–26	9,313	
September 20	Furman	E. J. Whitmire Stadium; Cullowhee, NC	L 14–28	11,150	
September 27	at Clemson*	Memorial Stadium; Clemson, SC	L 10–17	58,490	
October 4	at Middle Tennessee*	Johnny "Red" Floyd Stadium; Murfreesboro, TN	W 24–10	3,000	
October 11	The Citadel	E. J. Whitmire Stadium; Cullowhee, NC	L 21–28	10,640	
October 18	at East Carolina*	Ficklen Memorial Stadium; Greenville, NC	L 14–24	21,300	
October 25	Marshall	E. J. Whitmire Stadium; Cullowhee, NC	T 13–13	11,850	
November 1	at Appalachian State	Conrad Stadium; Boone, NC (rivalry)	L 24–27	15,850	
November 8	at Chattanooga	Chamberlain Field; Chattanooga, TN	L 14–39	9,000	
November 15	at East Tennessee State	Memorial Center; Johnson City, TN	W 20–17	5,128	
*Non-conference game
