= 1981 Davidson Wildcats football team =

American college football season

1981 Davidson Wildcats football
- Conference: Southern Conference
- Record: 4–6 (0–0 SoCon)
- Head coach: Ed Farrell (8th season)
- Home stadium: Richardson Stadium

1981 Southern Conference football standings
	Conf.					Overall
Team	W		L		T	W		L		T
Furman $	5	–	2	–	0	8	–	3	–	0
VMI	3	–	1	–	1	6	–	3	–	1
East Tennessee State	4	–	2	–	0	6	–	5	–	0
Chattanooga	3	–	2	–	1	7	–	3	–	1
The Citadel	3	–	2	–	1	7	–	3	–	1
Western Carolina	3	–	4	–	0	4	–	7	–	0
Appalachian State	1	–	5	–	1	3	–	7	–	1
Marshall	1	–	5	–	0	2	–	9	–	0
Davidson	0	–	0	–	0	4	–	6	–	0
$ – Conference champion; This conference was a hybrid of I-AA and I-A programs. Davidson was classified as I-AA. The rest of the teams were I-A.

The 1981 Davidson Wildcats football team represented Davidson College as a member of the Southern Conference during the 1981 NCAA Division I-AA football season. Led by eighth-year head coach Ed Farrell, the Wildcats compiled an overall record of 4–6.

== Schedule ==
Date	Opponent	Site	Result	Attendance	Source
September 5	at Newberry*	Setzler Field; Newberry, SC	L 7–32	3,000	
September 12	at Wofford*	Snyder Field; Spartanburg, SC	W 22–21		
September 19	Lafayette*	Richardson Stadium; Davidson, NC	L 7–14	4,700	
October 3	at Bucknell*	Memorial Stadium; Lewisburg, PA	L 3–23	6,200	
October 10	Boston University*	Richardson Stadium; Davidson, NC	W 44–14	3,000	
October 17	at The Citadel*	Johnson Hagood Stadium; Charleston, SC	L 3–23	12,890	
October 24	Hampden–Sydney*	Richardson Stadium; Davidson, NC	W 42–14	4,000	
October 31	at Lehigh*	Taylor Stadium; Bethlehem, PA	L 7–69		
November 7	Furman*	Richardson Stadium; Davidson, NC	L 12–30	6,300	
November 14	Catawba*	Richardson Stadium; Davidson, NC	W 52–29	6,600	
*Non-conference game
