= 1981 East Tennessee State Buccaneers football team =

American college football season

1981 East Tennessee State Buccaneers football
- Conference: Southern Conference
- Record: 6–5 (4–2 SoCon)
- Head coach: Jack Carlisle (4th season)
- Home stadium: Memorial Center

1981 Southern Conference football standings
	Conf.					Overall
Team	W		L		T	W		L		T
Furman $	5	–	2	–	0	8	–	3	–	0
VMI	3	–	1	–	1	6	–	3	–	1
East Tennessee State	4	–	2	–	0	6	–	5	–	0
Chattanooga	3	–	2	–	1	7	–	3	–	1
The Citadel	3	–	2	–	1	7	–	3	–	1
Western Carolina	3	–	4	–	0	4	–	7	–	0
Appalachian State	1	–	5	–	1	3	–	7	–	1
Marshall	1	–	5	–	0	2	–	9	–	0
Davidson	0	–	0	–	0	4	–	6	–	0
$ – Conference champion; This conference was a hybrid of I-AA and I-A programs. Davidson was classified as I-AA. The rest of the teams were I-A.

The 1981 East Tennessee State Buccaneers football team was an American football team that represented East Tennessee State University as a member of the Southern Conference (SoCon) during the 1981 NCAA Division I-A football season. Led by fourth-year head coach Jack Carlisle, the Buccaneers compiled and overall record of 6–5 with a mark of 4–2 in conference play, placing third in the SoCon.

== Schedule ==
Date	Opponent	Site	Result	Attendance	Source
September 5	Tennessee Tech*	Memorial Center; Johnson City, TN	W 31–22	7,212	
September 12	at Louisiana Tech*	Joe Aillet Stadium; Ruston, LA	L 3–31	17,500	
September 19	at Furman	Paladin Stadium; Greenville, SC	L 0–21	12,070	
September 26	at Marshall	Fairfield Stadium; Huntington, WV	W 14–10	15,625	
October 3	The Citadel	Memorial Center; Johnson City, TN	W 17–13	8,773	
October 17	at Western Carolina	E. J. Whitmire Stadium; Cullowhee, NC	W 34–23	11,250	
October 24	at Wofford*	Snyder Field; Spartanburg, SC	W 34–8	4,555	
October 31	Chattanooga	Memorial Center; Johnson City, TN	L 0–17		
November 7	East Carolina*	Memorial Center; Johnson City, TN	L 23–66	21,342	
November 14	Appalachian State	Memorial Center; Johnson City, TN	W 21–14	7,123	
November 21	at James Madison*	JMU Stadium; Harrisonburg, VA	L 14–17		
*Non-conference game

== Roster ==
1981 East Tennessee State Buccaneers football team roster
Players			Coaches
Offense: Pos. / # / Name / Class; RB / 31 / Earl Ferrell / Sr	Defense: Pos. / # / Name / Class; LB / 41 / Tim Novak / Sr	Special teams: Pos. / # / Name / Class	Head coach: Jack Carlisle; Coordinators/assistant coaches Legend: (C) Team captain; (S) Suspended; (I) Ineligible; Injured; Redshirt
