= 1980 Appalachian State Mountaineers football team =

American college football season

1980 Appalachian State Mountaineers football
- Conference: Southern Conference
- Record: 6–4–1 (4–2–1 SoCon)
- Head coach: Mike Working (1st season)
- Home stadium: Conrad Stadium

1980 Southern Conference football standings
	Conf.					Overall
Team	W		L		T	W		L		T
Furman $	7	–	0	–	0	9	–	1	–	1
Chattanooga	5	–	2	–	0	8	–	3	–	0
Appalachian State	4	–	2	–	1	6	–	4	–	1
The Citadel	3	–	2	–	0	7	–	4	–	0
Western Carolina	2	–	4	–	1	3	–	7	–	1
VMI	1	–	4	–	1	3	–	7	–	1
East Tennessee State	1	–	4	–	0	2	–	9	–	0
Marshall	0	–	5	–	1	2	–	8	–	1
Davidson	0	–	0	–	0	5	–	5	–	0
$ – Conference champion; This conference was a hybrid of I-A and I-AA programs. Davidson was classified as I-AA. The rest of the teams were I-A.

The 1980 Appalachian State Mountaineers football team was an American football team that represented Appalachian State University as a member of the Southern Conference (SoCon) during the 1980 NCAA Division I-A football season. In their first year under head coach Mike Working, the Mountaineers compiled an overall record of 6–4–1 with a mark of 4–2–1 in conference play, and finished third in the SoCon.

== Schedule ==
Date	Opponent	Site	Result	Attendance	Source
September 6	at James Madison*	Madison Stadium; Harrisonburg, VA	W 34–6	7,100	
September 13	The Citadel	Conrad Stadium; Boone, NC	W 17–14	15,250	
September 20	at Chattanooga	Chamberlain Field; Chattanooga, TN	L 7–14	11,000	
September 27	East Tennessee State	Conrad Stadium; Boone, NC	W 42–15	14,160	
October 4	at Marshall	Fairfield Stadium; Huntington, WV (rivalry)	W 23–6	14,010	
October 11	at NC State*	Carter–Finley Stadium; Raleigh, NC	L 14–17	41,800	
October 18	Lenoir–Rhyne*	Conrad Stadium; Boone, NC	W 57–25	11,500	
October 25	Furman	Conrad Stadium; Boone, NC	L 20–21	14,200	
November 1	Western Carolina	Conrad Stadium; Boone, NC (rivalry)	W 27–24	15,850	
November 8	at VMI	Alumni Memorial Field; Lexington, VA	T 16–16	4,700	
November 22	at Wake Forest*	Groves Stadium; Winston-Salem, NC	L 16–28	23,000	
*Non-conference game
