= Mike Working =

American gridiron football player and coach (born 1947)

Biographical details
- Born: December 16, 1947 (age 78)

Playing career
- 1969: North Carolina

Coaching career (HC unless noted)
- 1970: North Carolina (freshmen)
- 1971–1972: Army (assistant)
- 1973–1974: Tennessee (TE)
- 1975–1977: West Virginia (OL)
- 1978–1979: Wake Forest (OC)
- 1980–1982: Appalachian State
- 1983–1984: Detroit Lions (offensive assistant)
- 1987: Tulsa (WR)
- 1988–1990: Tulsa (OC/WR)
- 1988–1990: Tulsa (OC/WR)
- 1991–1993: McDonogh School (MD)
- 1994–2003: Mount Saint Joseph HS (MD)
- 2006: Winnipeg Blue Bombers (QB/PGC)
- 2007: Hamilton Tiger-Cats (OC)

Head coaching record
- Overall: 13–18–2 (college)

Mike Working (born December 16, 1947) is an American former gridiron football player and coach. He was the 16th head football coach at Appalachian State University, serving from 1980 to 1982. He coached at McDonogh School, and after a hazing incident involving his sons, coached at Mount Saint Joseph.

== Head coaching record ==
| Year | Team | Overall | Conference | Standing | Bowl/playoffs |
|---|---|---|---|---|---|
Appalachian State Mountaineers (Southern Conference) (1980–1982)
| 1980 | Appalachian State | 6–4–1 | 4–2–1 | 3rd | |
| 1981 | Appalachian State | 3–7–1 | 1–5–1 | 7th | |
| 1982 | Appalachian State | 4–7 | 3–4 | 4th | |
| Appalachian State: | | 13–18–2 | 8–11–2 | | |
| Total: | | 13–18–2 | | | |
