= 1981 The Citadel Bulldogs football team =

American college football season

1981 The Citadel Bulldogs football
- Conference: Southern Conference
- Record: 7–3–1 (3–2–1 SoCon)
- Head coach: Art Baker (4th season)
- Home stadium: Johnson Hagood Stadium

1981 Southern Conference football standings
	Conf.					Overall
Team	W		L		T	W		L		T
Furman $	5	–	2	–	0	8	–	3	–	0
VMI	3	–	1	–	1	6	–	3	–	1
East Tennessee State	4	–	2	–	0	6	–	5	–	0
Chattanooga	3	–	2	–	1	7	–	3	–	1
The Citadel	3	–	2	–	1	7	–	3	–	1
Western Carolina	3	–	4	–	0	4	–	7	–	0
Appalachian State	1	–	5	–	1	3	–	7	–	1
Marshall	1	–	5	–	0	2	–	9	–	0
Davidson	0	–	0	–	0	4	–	6	–	0
$ – Conference champion; This conference was a hybrid of I-AA and I-A programs. Davidson was classified as I-AA. The rest of the teams were I-A.

The 1981 The Citadel Bulldogs football team represented The Citadel, The Military College of South Carolina in the 1981 NCAA Division I-A football season. Art Baker served as head coach for the fourth season. The Bulldogs played as members of the Southern Conference and played home games at Johnson Hagood Stadium.

== Schedule ==
Date	Opponent	Site	Result	Attendance	Source
September 12	at Navy*	Navy–Marine Corps Memorial Stadium; Annapolis, MD	L 7–17	18,135	
September 19	Western Carolina	Johnson Hagood Stadium; Charleston, SC	W 12–3	18,950	
September 26	Appalachian State	Johnson Hagood Stadium; Charleston, SC	W 34–20	17,250	
October 3	at East Tennessee State	Memorial Center; Johnson City, TN	L 13–17	8,773	
October 10	vs. VMI	Foreman Field; Norfolk, VA (Oyster Bowl, Military Classic of the South)	L 0–14	20,000	
October 17	Davidson*	Johnson Hagood Stadium; Charleston, SC	W 23–3	12,890	
October 24	Newberry*	Johnson Hagood Stadium; Charleston, SC	W 55–14	14,450	
October 31	Presbyterian*	Johnson Hagood Stadium; Charleston, SC	W 21–3	10,850	
November 7	at Chattanooga	Chamberlain Field; Chattanooga, TN	T 28–28	10,132	
November 14	Wofford*	Johnson Hagood Stadium; Charleston, SC (rivalry)	W 24–14	11,185	
November 21	Furman^{†}	Johnson Hagood Stadium; Charleston, SC (rivalry)	W 35–18	20,150	
*Non-conference game; ^{†}Homecoming

== NFL Draft selections ==
Year	Round	Pick	Overall	Name	Team	Position
1981	9	5	226	Stump Mitchell	St. Louis Cardinals	RB
