= 1979 The Citadel Bulldogs football team =

American college football season

1979 The Citadel Bulldogs football
- Conference: Southern Conference
- Record: 6–5 (4–2 SoCon)
- Head coach: Art Baker (2nd season)
- Offensive coordinator: Ralph Friedgen (3rd season)
- Home stadium: Johnson Hagood Stadium

1979 Southern Conference football standings
	Conf.					Overall
Team	W		L		T	W		L		T
Chattanooga $	5	–	1	–	0	9	–	2	–	0
VMI	4	–	1	–	0	6	–	4	–	1
The Citadel	4	–	2	–	0	6	–	5	–	0
Furman	4	–	3	–	0	5	–	6	–	0
Appalachian State	3	–	4	–	0	3	–	8	–	0
East Tennessee State	2	–	3	–	0	7	–	4	–	0
Western Carolina	2	–	4	–	0	6	–	5	–	0
Marshall	0	–	6	–	0	1	–	10	–	0
Davidson	0	–	0	–	0	6	–	4	–	0
$ – Conference champion

The 1979 The Citadel Bulldogs football team represented The Citadel, The Military College of South Carolina in the 1979 NCAA Division I-A football season. Art Baker served as head coach for the second season. The Bulldogs played as members of the Southern Conference and played home games at Johnson Hagood Stadium.

== Schedule ==
Date	Opponent	Site	Result	Attendance	Source
September 8	Presbyterian*	Johnson Hagood Stadium; Charleston, SC	L 13–21	17,500	
September 15	at Navy*	Navy–Marine Corps Memorial Stadium; Annapolis, MD	L 7–26	17,835	
September 22	at Vanderbilt*	Dudley Field; Nashville, TN	W 27–14	26,500	
September 29	Appalachian State	Johnson Hagood Stadium; Charleston, SC	W 24–23	17,850	
October 6	Western Carolina	Johnson Hagood Stadium; Charleston, SC	W 21–19	14,750	
October 13	at East Carolina*	Ficklen Memorial Stadium; Greenville, NC	L 7–49	28,751	
October 20	at VMI	Alumni Memorial Field; Lexington, VA (rivalry)	W 37–6	8,100	
October 27	Wofford*	Johnson Hagood Stadium; Charleston, SC (rivalry)	W 49–30	18,960	
November 3	at Marshall	Fairfield Stadium; Huntington, WV	W 17–16	13,000	
November 10	at Chattanooga	Chamberlain Field; Chattanooga, TN	L 7–28		
November 17	Furman^{†}	Johnson Hagood Stadium; Charleston, SC (rivalry)	L 44–45	20,130	
*Non-conference game; ^{†}Homecoming
