= Art Baker (American football coach) =

American football coach (1929–2024)

Biographical details
- Born: November 30, 1929; Sumter, South Carolina, U.S.
- Died: January 13, 2024 (aged 94); Sumter, South Carolina, U.S.

Coaching career (HC unless noted)
- 1965–1969: Clemson (RB)
- 1970–1972: Texas Tech (assistant)
- 1973–1977: Furman
- 1978–1982: The Citadel
- 1983: East Carolina (assistant)
- 1984: Florida State (QB)
- 1985–1988: East Carolina

Head coaching record
- Overall: 69–80–5

Arthur Baker (November 30, 1929 – January 13, 2024) was an American football coach. He served as the head football coach at Furman University (1973–1977), The Citadel (1978–1982) and East Carolina University (1985–1988). Baker was a 1948 graduate of Edmunds High School (now Sumter High School) in Sumter, South Carolina, and a 1953 Presbyterian College graduate and also was a former assistant football coach there. Baker played football for the Blue Hose from 1950 to 1952, starting at halfback his last two years. He was a member of Mu chapter of Pi Kappa Alpha fraternity. Baker was a recipient of Presbyterian's Bob Waters Award. He was an assistant coach for Frank Howard at Clemson from 1965 to 1969. From 1970 to 1972, Baker was an assistant coach at Texas Tech. Baker succeeded Bob King at Furman for the 1973 season. As head coach at Furman, Baker hired Dick Sheridan, Jimmy Satterfield and Bobby Johnson as assistants and all later became head coaches at Furman. Baker was an assistant coach in 1984 for Bobby Bowden at Florida State. He was Associate Athletics Director for Development and Gamecock Club Director at the University of South Carolina for six and a half years before retiring on June 30, 1995.

== Personal life ==
Baker was born in Sumter, South Carolina. He married Edith Edens of Dalzell, South Carolina. They had four children and four grandchildren.

Baker died in Sumter on January 13, 2024, at the age of 94.

== Head coaching record ==
Year	Team	Overall	Conference	Standing	Bowl/playoffs
Furman Paladins (Southern Conference) (1973–1977)
1973	Furman	7–4	3–3	T–4th	
1974	Furman	5–6	2–4	7th	
1975	Furman	5–5–1	2–4	T–6th	
1976	Furman	6–4–1	2–2–1	T–3rd	
1977	Furman	4–5–2	3–2–1	4th	
Furman:		27–24–4	12–15–2		
The Citadel Bulldogs (Southern Conference) (1978–1984)
1978	The Citadel	5–6	2–3	5th	
1979	The Citadel	6–5	4–3	4th	
1980	The Citadel	7–4	3–2	4th	
1981	The Citadel	7–3–1	3–2–1	T–4th	
1982	The Citadel	5–6	3–4	4th	
The Citadel:		30–24–1	15–16–1		
East Carolina Pirates (NCAA Division I-A independent) (1985–1988)
1985	East Carolina	2–9			
1986	East Carolina	2–9			
1987	East Carolina	5–6			
1988	East Carolina	3–8			
East Carolina:		12–32			
Total:		69–80–5			
