= 1975 Richmond Spiders football team =

American college football season

1975 Richmond Spiders football

SoCon champion
- Conference: Southern Conference
- Record: 5–6 (5–1 SoCon)
- Head coach: Jim Tait (2nd season)
- Home stadium: City Stadium

1975 Southern Conference football standings
	Conf.					Overall
Team	W		L		T	W		L		T
Richmond $	5	–	1	–	0	5	–	6	–	0
East Carolina	4	–	2	–	0	8	–	3	–	0
Appalachian State	3	–	2	–	0	8	–	3	–	0
The Citadel	4	–	3	–	0	6	–	5	–	0
William & Mary	2	–	3	–	0	2	–	9	–	0
Furman	2	–	4	–	0	5	–	5	–	1
VMI	2	–	4	–	0	3	–	8	–	0
Davidson	0	–	3	–	0	1	–	8	–	0
$ – Conference champion

The 1975 Richmond Spiders football team was an American football team that represented the University of Richmond as a member of the Southern Conference (SoCon) during the 1975 NCAA Division I football season. In their second year under head coach Jim Tait, the team compiled an overall record of 5–6 with a mark of 5–1 in conference play, placing first in the SoCon.

== Schedule ==
Date	Opponent	Site	Result	Attendance	Source
September 13	at Cincinnati*	Nippert Stadium; Cincinnati, OH	L 6–19	10,751	
September 20	Furman	City Stadium; Richmond, VA	W 27–21		
September 27	at Virginia Tech*	Lane Stadium; Blacksburg, VA	L 9–21	30,000	
October 4	at East Carolina	Ficklen Memorial Stadium; Greenville, NC	W 17–14	16,542	
October 11	Ball State*	City Stadium; Richmond, VA	L 14–25	11,000	
October 18	VMI	City Stadium; Richmond, VA (Tobacco Bowl, rivalry)	W 24–19	12,000	
October 25	at Appalachian State	Conrad Stadium; Boone, NC	W 24–17	14,195	
November 1	at Georgia*	Sanford Stadium; Athens, GA	L 24–28	41,500	
November 8	The Citadel	City Stadium; Richmond, VA	W 7–0	12,500	
November 15	West Virginia*	City Stadium; Richmond, VA	L 13–31	16,500	
November 22	at William & Mary	Cary Field; Williamsburg, VA (rivalry)	L 21–31	11,000	
*Non-conference game

== Roster ==
1975 Richmond Spiders football team roster
Players
Coaches
Offense

Pos.	#	Name	Class
FB	28	Bob Allen	Sr
OT	71	Joe Allen	So
G	61	Dave Ball	So
OT		Dennis Blomquist	Fr
G	63	Lou Bonato	So
C		Mike Bromir	Fr
WR	89	Rickey Brown	Jr
WR	81	John Call	Jr
FB	34	Dickie Carey	So
FB		Bill Cheshire	Fr
G	65	James Cones	So
OT	72	Rodney Elam	Sr
RB	41	Roger Frustenburg	So
WR		Chris Gooch	Fr
WR	24	Buster Jackson	So
WR		Harvey Jones	Fr
OT	70	Rex Kipps	Jr
RB	22	Demetri Kornegay	So
RB	46	Edvins Kreilis	Jr
TE	83	Tim Manwaring	Jr
OT	68	Doug McGee	Jr
WR		Alan Miller	Fr
FB	45	Al Newby	Jr
G	67	Joe Palazeti	Jr
FB	42	John Palazeti	Sr
G	64	Cubby Pritchard	So
TE	82	Mike Ratferty	Sr
QB		Milton Ruffin	Fr
QB		Dan Ryczek	Fr
QB	10	Larry Shaw	Jr
QB	13	Dave Taylor	So
C	55	Keith Waldrop	So
QB		Scott Wallace	Fr
WR	9	Ken White	So
OT	76	Mark Yocum	So

Defense

Pos.	#	Name	Class
DB	35	Mike Andrus	Jr
MG		Ken Ball	Fr
MG	77	Frank Blua	Jr
DE	90	Garland Branch	So
LB	78	Orlandus Branch	Jr
DE		Terry Chase	Fr
DT	54	Dickie Childress	Jr
LB		Pat Coates	Fr
DE	88	Steve Colantuoni	So
DE	84	Mike Copley	So
DB	43	Carroll Craig	Sr
DB		Rickey Crawford	Fr
DE		Bruno Delicato	Fr
DT	49	Steve Dodd	Jr
DT	62	Gary Edwards	Jr
LB	44	Rene Fretz	So
DB		Jeff Gleeson	Fr
MG	69	Brad Greenburg	So
DB	29	Wade Hairfield	Sr
LB	60	Bob Hanback	So
MG		David Harris	Fr
DB		David Haynie	Fr
DB		Ray Kelly	Fr
DE	80	Frank Koblischke	Sr
DT	95	Gary Lorenz	So
DE		Dennis Loughran	Fr
LB	53	Joe Marchettl	Sr
DB	20	Jim McGaffrey	Jr
SS		Jeff Nixon	Fr
DT		Don Perfall	Fr
DT	87	Pitman Rock	Jr
LB	59	Billy Rogers	Sr
DB	39	Behle Schaaf	Sr
DT	94	John Smith	So
DB	36	Marvin Smith	Jr
LB	85	David Sowder	So
DE	86	Rick Sowieta	Jr
DB	37	Dave Sylvester	Jr
B	92	Dave Templeton	Jr
DB	7	Mike Usher	Sr
DB	11	Rick Walters	Jr
DB	50	Allan Werle	Jr

Special teams

Pos.	#	Name	Class
P	5	Bruce Allen	So
K	15	Terry Carter	Sr
K	16	Johnnie Jones	Jr

Head coach

- Jim Tait

Coordinators/assistant coaches

Legend

- (C) Team captain
- (S) Suspended
- (I) Ineligible
- Injured
- Redshirt
