= 1982 The Citadel Bulldogs football team =

American college football season

1982 The Citadel Bulldogs football
- Conference: Southern Conference
- Record: 5–6 (3–4 SoCon)
- Head coach: Art Baker (5th season)
- Home stadium: Johnson Hagood Stadium

1982 Southern Conference football standings
	Conf.					Overall
Team	W		L		T	W		L		T
No. 6 Furman $^	6	–	1	–	0	9	–	3	–	0
No. 17 Chattanooga	5	–	1	–	0	7	–	4	–	0
Western Carolina	4	–	2	–	0	6	–	5	–	0
The Citadel	3	–	4	–	0	5	–	6	–	0
Appalachian State	3	–	4	–	0	4	–	7	–	0
VMI	2	–	3	–	0	5	–	6	–	0
East Tennessee State	2	–	5	–	0	2	–	9	–	0
Marshall	1	–	6	–	0	3	–	7	–	0
Davidson	0	–	0	–	0	3	–	7	–	0
$ – Conference champion; ^ – NCAA Division I-AA playoff participant; Rankings from NCAA Division I-AA Football Committee poll

The 1982 The Citadel Bulldogs football team represented The Citadel, The Military College of South Carolina in the 1982 NCAA Division I-AA football season. Art Baker served as head coach for the fifth season. The Bulldogs played as members of the Southern Conference and played home games at Johnson Hagood Stadium.

== Schedule ==
Date	Time	Opponent	Site	Result	Attendance	Source
September 11		Presbyterian*	Johnson Hagood Stadium; Charleston, SC	W 21–16	13,460	
September 18		at Georgia Tech*	Grant Field; Atlanta, GA	L 7–36	24,463	
September 25		Wofford*	Johnson Hagood Stadium; Charleston, SC (rivalry)	W 21–14	12,680	
October 2		at Appalachian State	Conrad Stadium; Boone, NC	L 22–48	15,800	
October 9		VMI	Johnson Hagood Stadium; Charleston, SC (rivalry)	W 21–7	17,200	
October 16		East Tennessee State	Johnson Hagood Stadium; Charleston, SC	L 0–3	11,650	
October 23	2:00 p.m.	at Navy*	Navy–Marine Corps Memorial Stadium; Annapolis, MD	L 3–28	29,249	
October 30	2:01 p.m.	Marshall	Johnson Hagood Stadium; Charleston, SC	W 24–7	17,850	
November 6		at Western Carolina	E. J. Whitmire Stadium; Cullowhee, NC	W 24–20	8,132	
November 13		No. 19 Chattanooga^{†}	Johnson Hagood Stadium; Charleston, SC	L 7–24	18,480	
November 20		at No. 6 Furman	Paladin Stadium; Greenville, SC (rivalry)	L 0–27	13,123	
*Non-conference game; ^{†}Homecoming; Rankings from NCAA Division I-AA Football Committee Poll released prior to the game; All times are in Eastern time
