= 1981 Furman Paladins football team =

American college football season

1981 Furman Paladins football

SoCon champion
- Conference: Southern Conference
- Record: 8–3 (5–2 SoCon)
- Head coach: Dick Sheridan (4th season)
- Captains: Tim Sorrells; Charlie Anderson; Bruce Gheesling; Steve O'Neill
- Home stadium: Paladin Stadium

1981 Southern Conference football standings
	Conf.					Overall
Team	W		L		T	W		L		T
Furman $	5	–	2	–	0	8	–	3	–	0
VMI	3	–	1	–	1	6	–	3	–	1
East Tennessee State	4	–	2	–	0	6	–	5	–	0
Chattanooga	3	–	2	–	1	7	–	3	–	1
The Citadel	3	–	2	–	1	7	–	3	–	1
Western Carolina	3	–	4	–	0	4	–	7	–	0
Appalachian State	1	–	5	–	1	3	–	7	–	1
Marshall	1	–	5	–	0	2	–	9	–	0
Davidson	0	–	0	–	0	4	–	6	–	0
$ – Conference champion; This conference was a hybrid of I-AA and I-A programs. Davidson was classified as I-AA. The rest of the teams were I-A.

The 1981 Furman Paladins football team was an American football team that represented Furman University as a member of the Southern Conference (SoCon) during the 1981 NCAA Division I-A football season. In their fourth year under head coach Dick Sheridan, the Paladins compiled an overall record of 8–3 with a conference mark of 5–2, winning the SoCon title for the second consecutive season.

== Schedule ==
Date	Opponent	Site	Result	Attendance	Source
September 12	at Florida*	Florida Field; Gainesville, FL	L 7–35	54,439	
September 19	East Tennessee State	Paladin Stadium; Greenville, SC	W 21–0	12,070	
September 26	at Western Carolina	Whitmire Stadium; Cullowhee, NC	W 31–27	11,850	
October 3	Chattanooga	Paladin Stadium; Greenville, SC	L 28–31	12,525	
October 10	Appalachian State	Paladin Stadium; Greenville, SC	W 22–18	19,058	
October 17	at James Madison*	JMU Stadium; Harrisonburg, VA	W 30–14	12,500	
October 24	Liberty Baptist*	Paladin Stadium; Greenville, SC	W 38–14	9,250	
October 31	Marshall	Paladin Stadium; Greenville, SC	W 35–3	10,811	
November 7	at Davidson*	Richardson Stadium; Davidson, NC	W 30–12	6,300	
November 14	at VMI	Alumni Memorial Field; Lexington, VA	W 33–21	5,100	
November 21	at The Citadel	Johnson Hagood Stadium; Charleston, SC (rivalry)	L 18–35	20,150	
*Non-conference game
