= 1982 Marshall Thundering Herd football team =

American college football season

1982 Marshall Thundering Herd football
- Conference: Southern Conference
- Record: 3–8 (1–6 SoCon)
- Head coach: Sonny Randle (4th season)
- Captain: Game captains
- Home stadium: Fairfield Stadium

1982 Southern Conference football standings
	Conf.					Overall
Team	W		L		T	W		L		T
No. 6 Furman $^	6	–	1	–	0	9	–	3	–	0
No. 17 Chattanooga	5	–	1	–	0	7	–	4	–	0
Western Carolina	4	–	2	–	0	6	–	5	–	0
The Citadel	3	–	4	–	0	5	–	6	–	0
Appalachian State	3	–	4	–	0	4	–	7	–	0
VMI	2	–	3	–	0	5	–	6	–	0
East Tennessee State	2	–	5	–	0	2	–	9	–	0
Marshall	1	–	6	–	0	3	–	7	–	0
Davidson	0	–	0	–	0	3	–	7	–	0
$ – Conference champion; ^ – NCAA Division I-AA playoff participant; Rankings from NCAA Division I-AA Football Committee poll

The 1982 Marshall Thundering Herd football team was an American football team that represented Marshall University in the Southern Conference (SoCon) during the 1982 NCAA Division I-AA football season. In its fourth season under head coach Sonny Randle, the team compiled a 3–8 record (1–6 against conference opponents) and played its home games at Fairfield Stadium in Huntington, West Virginia.

== Schedule ==
Date	Time	Opponent	Site	Result	Attendance	Source
September 4	7:00 p.m.	Kent State*	Fairfield Stadium; Huntington, WV	W 30–21	16,207	
September 11	7:00 p.m.	Western Michigan*	Fairfield Stadium; Huntington, WV	L 0–34	17,188	
September 18	7:30 p.m.	at Toledo*	Glass Bowl; Toledo, OH	L 9–17	21,319	
October 2		Chattanooga	Fairfield Stadium; Huntington, WV	L 7–17	12,224	
October 8	7:00 p.m.	Appalachian State	Fairfield Stadium; Huntington, WV (rivalry)	L 13–21	9,117	
October 16		at Western Carolina	E. J. Whitmire Stadium; Cullowhee, NC	L 13–21	5,522	
October 23	1:30 p.m.	Akron*^{†}	Fairfield Stadium; Huntington, WV	W 12–10	11,714	
October 30	2:01 p.m.	at The Citadel	Johnson Hagood Stadium; Charleston, SC	L 7–24	17,850	
November 6	2:00 p.m.	at VMI	Alumni Memorial Field; Lexington, VA	W 22–20	5,200	
November 13	1:30 p.m.	No. 7 Furman	Fairfield Stadium; Huntington, WV	L 7–45	7,673	
November 20	7:30 p.m.	at East Tennessee State	Memorial Center; Johnson City, TN	L 0–28	3,600	
*Non-conference game; ^{†}Homecoming; Rankings from NCAA Division I-AA Football Committee Poll released prior to the game; All times are in Eastern time
