= Jack Carlisle =

American football coach (1929–2021)

Biographical details
- Born: September 23, 1929
- Died: July 27, 2021 (aged 91); New Albany, Mississippi, U.S.

Coaching career (HC unless noted)
- 1952: Ethel HS (MS)
- 1953–1955: Lula–Rich HS (MS)
- 1956–1958: Nettleton HS (MS)
- 1959–1960: Collierville HS (TN)
- 1961–1970: Murrah HS (MS)
- 1971–1974: Jackson Prep HS (MS)
- 1975–1977: Ole Miss (JV)
- 1978–1982: East Tennessee State
- 1983–1993: Madison-Ridgeland (MS)
- 1994: St. Joseph HS (MS) (assistant)
- 1997: Jackson Prep HS (MS) (assistant)
- 1998: East Central (MS) (assistant)

Head coaching record
- Overall: 21–34 (college)

Jack Mason Carlisle (September 23, 1929 – July 27, 2021) was an American football coach. He served as the head football coach at East Tennessee State University in Johnson City, Tennessee from 1978 to 1982, compiling a record of 21–34.

As a high school football coach at Lula–Rich High School in Mississippi, he coached Thomas Harris who later wrote the novel, The Silence of the Lambs.

Carlisle only had one leg due to an accident when he was 18 years old. He died on July 27, 2021, at his home in New Albany, Mississippi.

== Head coaching record ==
=== College ===
| Year | Team | Overall | Conference | Standing | Bowl/playoffs |
|---|---|---|---|---|---|
East Tennessee State Buccaneers (Southern Conference) (1978–1982)
| 1978 | East Tennessee State | 4–7 | 0–0 | NA | |
| 1979 | East Tennessee State | 7–4 | 2–3 | 6th | |
| 1980 | East Tennessee State | 2–9 | 1–4 | 7th | |
| 1981 | East Tennessee State | 6–5 | 4–3 | 3rd | |
| 1982 | East Tennessee State | 2–9 | 2–5 | 7th | |
| East Tennessee State: | | 21–34 | 9–15 | | |
| Total: | | 21–34 | | | |
