= 1979 Furman Paladins football team =

American college football season

1979 Furman Paladins football
- Conference: Southern Conference
- Record: 5–6 (4–3 SoCon)
- Head coach: Dick Sheridan (2nd season)
- Captains: David Henderson; David Lyle; Jay Cory
- Home stadium: Sirrine Stadium

1979 Southern Conference football standings
	Conf.					Overall
Team	W		L		T	W		L		T
Chattanooga $	5	–	1	–	0	9	–	2	–	0
VMI	4	–	1	–	0	6	–	4	–	1
The Citadel	4	–	2	–	0	6	–	5	–	0
Furman	4	–	3	–	0	5	–	6	–	0
Appalachian State	3	–	4	–	0	3	–	8	–	0
East Tennessee State	2	–	3	–	0	7	–	4	–	0
Western Carolina	2	–	4	–	0	6	–	5	–	0
Marshall	0	–	6	–	0	1	–	10	–	0
Davidson	0	–	0	–	0	6	–	4	–	0
$ – Conference champion

The 1979 Furman Paladins football team was an American football team that represented Furman University as a member of the Southern Conference (SoCon) during the 1979 NCAA Division I-A football season. In their second year under head coach Dick Sheridan, the Paladins compiled an overall record of 5–6 with a conference mark of 4–3, placing fourth in the SoCon.

== Schedule ==
Date	Opponent	Site	Result	Attendance	Source
September 8	at Clemson*	Memorial Stadium; Clemson, SC	L 0–21	55,908	
September 15	Presbyterian*	Sirrine Stadium; Greenville, SC	L 10–17	9,844	
September 22	Chattanooga	Sirrine Stadium; Greenville, SC	L 14–45		
September 29	East Tennessee State	Sirrine Stadium; Greenville, SC	L 24–28		
October 6	at Wofford*	Snyder Field; Spartanburg, SC (rivalry)	L 17–27	7,000	
October 13	Marshall	Sirrine Stadium; Greenville, SC	W 34–24	5,616	
October 20	Appalachian State	Sirrine Stadium; Greenville, SC	W 31–17	13,287	
October 27	at VMI	Alumni Memorial Field; Lexington, VA	L 20–21	3,800	
November 3	at Davidson	Richardson Stadium; Davidson, NC	W 63–55	4,500	
November 10	Western Carolina	Sirrine Stadium; Greenville, SC	W 23–14	8,854	
November 17	at The Citadel	Johnson Hagood Stadium; Charleston, SC (rivalry)	W 45–44	20,130	
*Non-conference game

== Roster ==
1979 Furman Paladins football team roster
Players
Coaches
Offense

Pos.	#	Name	Class
RB	32	Steve Bishop	Jr
TE	88	Terry Clark	So
RB	43	Brothel Cole	So
OL	54	Jay Cory	Sr
FB	34	Sandy Davis	Sr
WR	44	Joe Davison	Jr
WR	24	Mark Grainger	Jr
RB	31	Mike Glenn	So
RB	30	Ricky Hall	So
QB	12	David Henderson	Sr
OL	77	Joe Holt	Sr
QB	18	Jeff Johnson	So
TE	89	Zach Kelehear	Jr
WR	19	Skip Lax	Sr
WR	87	Billy Lee	So
TE	86	Steve McDougall	Sr
OL	70	Tom Morrish	Jr
OL	65	Scott Sellers	Sr
QB	11	Tim Sorrells	So
OL	61	Stan Stanley	Sr
FB	35	Mark Taylor	Jr
OL	67	Bobby Woods	Sr

Defense

Pos.	#	Name	Class
DB	28	Chris Buono	Jr
DB	10	Jeff Burke	So
LB	55	Ronnie Cox	Jr
DB	37	Tony Edwards	So
DB	22	Bruce Fowler	Jr
LB	51	Bruce Gheesling	So
DL	76	Dave Lyle	Sr
DL	78	Ansel Matthews	Jr
DE	81	Scott Montgomery	Sr
LB	52	Steve O'Neill	So
DL	83	Tim Partridge	So
DB	27	Brent Sanders	So
LB	56	Jerry Scott	Jr
DE	84	Larry Scott	So
DE	62	Jeff Snipes	Jr
DL	79	Floyd Swilley	Jr

Special teams

Pos.	#	Name	Class
P	41	Chris Horton	So
K	40	Keith Potter	So

Head coach

- Dick Sheridan

Coordinators/assistant coaches

Legend

- (C) Team captain
- (S) Suspended
- (I) Ineligible
- Injured
- Redshirt
