= Electro-Mech Scoreboards =

Electro-Mech Scoreboard Company
- Type: Privately Held Company
- Industry: Scoreboard
- Founded: 1963
- Headquarters: Wrightsville, Georgia, United States
- Products: Baseball Scoreboards; Basketball Scoreboards; Football Scoreboards; Soccer Scoreboards; Hockey Scoreboards
- Number of employees: About 70
- Website: www.electro-mech.com

Electro-Mech is an American manufacturer of electronic scoreboards and scoreboard accessories. The company serves all sports markets in the United States, but focuses primarily on smaller venues such as high schools, recreation parks, and college facilities and is most active in the southeastern United States.

== History ==
Electro-Mech is an offshoot of a company based in Macon, Georgia called Peach State Amusements. The original company was known for building and servicing pinball machines. Peach State had a colorful history which included servicing various games that had been modified to facilitate gambling—an illegal practice in the state of Georgia. Peach State pursued the production of scoreboards in the early 1960s, but the company closed before having significant impact on the scoreboard industry.

Electro-Mech was founded by a handful of former Peach State employees with capital supplied by Mr. Francis Shurling. Shurling was a native of Wrightsville, Georgia, and arranged for the new scoreboard manufacturing facility to be built there. The doors opened in 1963. In the early years of Electro-Mech Charles McMichael and Hilton Holton became stockholders. Mr. Holton retired in 2001 and sold his stock back to the company a few years later, while the Shurling and McMichael families continue ownership of Electro-Mech.

== Products and services ==
Electro-Mech was created with a single purpose in mind: to manufacture scoreboards. Over the years the company has dabbled in a variety of other activities ranging from building wiring sub-assemblies used in cherry picker lifts to Christmas tree farming. The core business of scoreboards has remained the company's primary focus and primary source of revenue.

By volume, Electro-Mech manufactures more baseball scoreboards than any other sports category. Basketball is the second most popular sport by volume and football the third. Soccer, hockey, and a handful of specialty scoreboards round out the main product line.

Electro-Mech manufactures a variety of accessories for use with their scoreboards. Control consoles, wireless RF modems sets, and customizable ID panels are all common accessories manufactured by Electro-Mech. Other accessories, such as horns and data cable, are outsourced.

== Technology ==
For over twenty years, 1967–1989, Electro-Mech scoreboards were designed around electro-mechanical technology with rotating motors and other moving parts to turn on and off the light bulbs that formed numbers. In 1989 Electro-Mech released its first attempt at using solid state electronics for a control system—that is, a system with no moving parts. This shift in technology signaled the beginning of a series of innovations which have kept the company's product line changing and expanding at an ever increasing rate.

Electro-Mech rolled out a line of scoreboards controlled by microprocessors in 1992. The first displays to use light emitting diodes (LEDs) instead of light bulbs came off of the assembly line in 1996. In 1999 the company offered a wireless control system marketed under the ScoreLink brand name. In 2002 Electro-Mech began building outdoor scoreboards with super-bright LEDs.

In recent years the company has focused on improving the reliability of the basic sub-systems within their scoreboards and providing new options for high-end scoreboard packages including video displays. Innovations for components manufactured within the Wrightsville plant include ID panels that incorporate non-rectangular elements such as arches and domes. For video displays and message centers packaged with their scoreboards, Electro-Mech has entered into a partnership with Vantage LED, a California-based manufacturer with experience building electronic signs for the sports market.

== Sales and Marketing ==
Unlike the two major American scoreboard manufacturers (Daktronics and Trans-Lux, which are public companies), Electro-Mech is a privately held company that does not release revenue figures and sales breakdowns for public consumption. Some of the company's marketing literature has provided an estimate of over 40,000 signs in service. Assuming an average lifespan of ten to fifteen years for a scoreboard, one can guess that Electro-Mech produces well over 1,000 units per year.

Electro-Mech occupied a special niche in the scoreboard market for most of its first few decades. The vast majority of its scoreboards were sold to bottlers of Coca-Cola, Pepsi, and other soft drinks throughout the 1970s, 1980s, and 1990s. The bottlers provided Electro-Mech scoreboards to schools, recreation parks, and other facilities where their soft drinks were served. In exchange, the facility operators signed contracts to exclusively stock vending machines and fountain dispensers with soft drinks purchased directly from the bottler for a number of years. The scoreboards, sometimes paid for in full by the bottlers, sometimes only partially funded, typically included ID panels with soft drink logos. It is a running joke among the Electro-Mech sales staff that nobody has ever heard of their company because all their customers think they have a "Coca-Cola scoreboard" or a "Pepsi scoreboard".

A gradual shift in bottler strategy starting around the year 2000 has lessened the intensity with which they court school systems and other customers who provide services primarily to children. For this reason the bottlers have become less interested in purchasing scoreboards. Thus Electro-Mech has recently shifted its marketing tactics toward direct sales and away from bottler sales. This is evident from their web site being revamped (most recently in the spring of 2017) with an emphasis on search engine marketing.
