= 1982 Bucknell Bison football team =

American college football season

1982 Bucknell Bison football
- Conference: Independent
- Record: 4–6
- Head coach: Bob Curtis (8th season)
- Captains: Marty Schaetzle; Mike Thompson; Steve Zenda
- Home stadium: Memorial Stadium

1982 NCAA Division I-AA independents football standings
	Conf.			Overall
Team	W	L	T	W		L		T
No. 3 Delaware ^		–		12	–	2	–	0
No. 4 Tennessee State ^		–		10	–	1	–	1
No. 13 Holy Cross		–		8	–	3	–	0
James Madison		–		8	–	3	–	0
No. 9 Colgate ^		–		8	–	4	–	0
No. 20 Lafayette		–		7	–	3	–	0
Nicholls State		–		7	–	4	–	0
No. 18 Northwestern State		–		6	–	5	–	0
Western Kentucky		–		5	–	5	–	0
Bucknell		–		4	–	6	–	0
Lehigh		–		4	–	6	–	0
Southeastern Louisiana		–		4	–	7	–	0
Northeastern		–		3	–	6	–	0
Alabama State		–		2	–	6	–	1
William & Mary		–		3	–	8	–	0
North Texas State		–		2	–	9	–	0
Richmond		–		0	–	10	–	0
^ – NCAA Division I-AA playoff participant; Rankings from NCAA Division I-AA Football Committee

The 1982 Bucknell Bison football team was an American football team that represented Bucknell University as an independent during the 1982 NCAA Division I-AA football season.

In their eighth year under head coach Bob Curtis, the Bison compiled a 4–6 record. Marty Schaetzle, Mike Thompson and Steve Zenda were the team captains.

Bucknell played its home games at Memorial Stadium on the university campus in Lewisburg, Pennsylvania.

== Schedule ==
Date	Opponent	Site	Result	Attendance	Source
September 11	at Dayton	Welcome Stadium; Dayton, OH	W 19–17	10,751	
September 25	Towson State	Memorial Stadium; Lewisburg, PA	L 18–22	3,500	
October 2	Lafayette^	Memorial Stadium; Lewisburg, PA	L 6–37	7,100	
October 9	at New Hampshire	Cowell Stadium; Durham, NH	L 0–3	6,248	
October 16	at Rochester	Fauver Stadium; Rochester, NY	W 20–0		
October 23	at Columbia	Baker Field; New York, NY	W 42–25	3,250	
October 30	at Lehigh	Taylor Stadium; Bethlehem, PA	L 10–21	11,300	
November 6	at Davidson	Richardson Stadium; Davidson, NC	W 21–0	2,200	
November 13	Boston University^{†}	Memorial Stadium; Lewisburg, PA	L 11–14	4,500	
November 20	No. 2 Delaware	Memorial Stadium; Lewisburg, PA	L 6–46	14,224	
^{†}Homecoming; ^ Parents Weekend; Rankings from NCAA Division I-AA Football Committee Poll released prior to the game
