= 1982 Western Kentucky Hilltoppers football team =

American college football season

1982 Western Kentucky Hilltoppers football
- Conference: Independent
- Record: 5–5
- Head coach: Jimmy Feix (15th season)
- Captain: Tom Fox
- Home stadium: Houchens Industries–L. T. Smith Stadium

1982 NCAA Division I-AA independents football standings
	Conf.			Overall
Team	W	L	T	W		L		T
No. 3 Delaware ^		–		12	–	2	–	0
No. 4 Tennessee State ^		–		10	–	1	–	1
No. 13 Holy Cross		–		8	–	3	–	0
James Madison		–		8	–	3	–	0
No. 9 Colgate ^		–		8	–	4	–	0
No. 20 Lafayette		–		7	–	3	–	0
Nicholls State		–		7	–	4	–	0
No. 18 Northwestern State		–		6	–	5	–	0
Western Kentucky		–		5	–	5	–	0
Bucknell		–		4	–	6	–	0
Lehigh		–		4	–	6	–	0
Southeastern Louisiana		–		4	–	7	–	0
Northeastern		–		3	–	6	–	0
Alabama State		–		2	–	6	–	1
William & Mary		–		3	–	8	–	0
North Texas State		–		2	–	9	–	0
Richmond		–		0	–	10	–	0
^ – NCAA Division I-AA playoff participant; Rankings from NCAA Division I-AA Football Committee

The 1982 Western Kentucky Hilltoppers football team was an American football team that represented Western Kentucky University as an independent during the 1982 NCAA Division I-AA football season. Led by 15th-year head coach Jimmy Feix, the Hilltoppers compiled a record of 5–5. The team's captain was Tom Fox.

== Schedule ==
Date	Time	Opponent	Site	Result	Attendance	Source
September 4	6:01 p.m.	at Louisville*	Fairgrounds Stadium; Louisville, KY	L 10–20	24,475	
September 11		at Delaware*	Delaware Stadium; Newark, DE	L 0–31	16,682	
September 18		Akron	L. T. Smith Stadium; Bowling Green, KY	W 10–3	8,500	
September 25		Austin Peay	L. T. Smith Stadium; Bowling Green, KY	W 33–15	9,000	
October 9		Youngstown State^{†}	L. T. Smith Stadium; Bowling Green, KY	W 28–14	12,500	
October 16		at Tennessee Tech	Tucker Stadium; Cookeville, TN	W 28–14	13,859	
October 23		No. 1 Eastern Kentucky	L. T. Smith Stadium; Bowling Green, KY (Battle of the Bluegrass)	L 21–35	18,000	
October 30		Morehead State	L. T. Smith Stadium; Bowling Green, KY	L 13–17	8,000	
November 6		Middle Tennessee	L. T. Smith Stadium; Bowling Green, KY (rivalry)	L 16–31	8,500	
November 20		at Murray State	Roy Stewart Stadium; Murray, KY (rivalry)	W 27–20	4,500	
*Non-conference game; ^{†}Homecoming; Rankings from NCAA Division I-AA Football Committee Poll released prior to the game; All times are in Central time
