= 1982 Lehigh Engineers football team =

American college football season

1982 Lehigh Engineers football
- Conference: Independent
- Record: 4–6
- Head coach: John Whitehead (7th season)
- Captains: John Ashler; Ed Godbolt; Jack Meyers
- Home stadium: Taylor Stadium

1982 NCAA Division I-AA independents football standings
	Conf.			Overall
Team	W	L	T	W		L		T
No. 3 Delaware ^		–		12	–	2	–	0
No. 4 Tennessee State ^		–		10	–	1	–	1
No. 13 Holy Cross		–		8	–	3	–	0
James Madison		–		8	–	3	–	0
No. 9 Colgate ^		–		8	–	4	–	0
No. 20 Lafayette		–		7	–	3	–	0
Nicholls State		–		7	–	4	–	0
No. 18 Northwestern State		–		6	–	5	–	0
Western Kentucky		–		5	–	5	–	0
Bucknell		–		4	–	6	–	0
Lehigh		–		4	–	6	–	0
Southeastern Louisiana		–		4	–	7	–	0
Northeastern		–		3	–	6	–	0
Alabama State		–		2	–	6	–	1
William & Mary		–		3	–	8	–	0
North Texas State		–		2	–	9	–	0
Richmond		–		0	–	10	–	0
^ – NCAA Division I-AA playoff participant; Rankings from NCAA Division I-AA Football Committee

The 1982 Lehigh Engineers football team was an American football team that represented Lehigh University as an independent during the 1982 NCAA Division I-AA football season.

In their seventh year under head coach John Whitehead, the Engineers compiled a 4–6 record. John Ashler, Ed Godbolt and Jack Meyers were the team captains.

Lehigh played its home games at Taylor Stadium on the university's main campus in Bethlehem, Pennsylvania.

== Schedule ==
Date	Opponent	Site	Result	Attendance	Source
September 11	at Maine	Alumni Field; Orono, ME	L 6–14	6,000	
September 18	Colgate	Taylor Stadium; Bethlehem, PA	L 14–21	10,800	
September 25	at Penn	Franklin Field; Philadelphia, PA	L 17–20	11,154	
October 2	Delaware	Taylor Stadium; Bethlehem, PA (rivalry)	L 19–20	14,000	
October 9	at Connecticut	Memorial Stadium; Storrs, CT	W 16–12	7,592	
October 16	New Hampshire	Taylor Stadium; Bethlehem, PA	W 20–17	12,000	
October 30	Bucknell	Taylor Stadium; Bethlehem, PA	W 21–10		
November 6	at Rhode Island	Meade Stadium; Kingston, RI	L 16–20	7,526	
November 13	East Stroudsburg	Taylor Stadium; Bethlehem, PA	W 25–7		
November 20	at Lafayette	Fisher Field; Easton, PA (The Rivalry)	L 6–34	18,000	
