= 1982 William & Mary Tribe football team =

American college football season

1982 William & Mary Tribe football
- Conference: Independent
- Record: 3–8
- Head coach: Jimmye Laycock (3rd season)
- Captains: Wayne MacMasters; Kurt Wrigley
- Home stadium: Cary Field

1982 NCAA Division I-AA independents football standings
	Conf.			Overall
Team	W	L	T	W		L		T
No. 3 Delaware ^		–		12	–	2	–	0
No. 4 Tennessee State ^		–		10	–	1	–	1
No. 13 Holy Cross		–		8	–	3	–	0
James Madison		–		8	–	3	–	0
No. 9 Colgate ^		–		8	–	4	–	0
No. 20 Lafayette		–		7	–	3	–	0
Nicholls State		–		7	–	4	–	0
No. 18 Northwestern State		–		6	–	5	–	0
Western Kentucky		–		5	–	5	–	0
Bucknell		–		4	–	6	–	0
Lehigh		–		4	–	6	–	0
Southeastern Louisiana		–		4	–	7	–	0
Northeastern		–		3	–	6	–	0
Alabama State		–		2	–	6	–	1
William & Mary		–		3	–	8	–	0
North Texas State		–		2	–	9	–	0
Richmond		–		0	–	10	–	0
^ – NCAA Division I-AA playoff participant; Rankings from NCAA Division I-AA Football Committee

The 1982 William & Mary Tribe football team represented the College of William & Mary as an independent during the 1982 NCAA Division I-AA football season. Led by Jimmye Laycock in his third year as head coach, William & Mary finished the season with a record of 3–8.

== Schedule ==
Date	Time	Opponent	Site	Result	Attendance	Source
September 11	1:30 p.m.	at Miami (OH)	Miami Field; Oxford, OH	L 17–35	18,241	
September 18		VMI	Cary Field; Williamsburg, VA (rivalry)	W 24–12	14,180	
September 25		at Virginia Tech	Lane Stadium; Blacksburg, VA	L 3–47	34,800	
October 2		at Rutgers	Rutgers Stadium; Piscataway, NJ	L 17–27	20,682	
October 9		Dartmouth	Cary Field; Williamsburg, VA	W 24–16	14,400	
October 16	2:00 p.m.	at Navy	Navy–Marine Corps Memorial Stadium; Annapolis, MD	L 3–39	21,354	
October 23		at No. 20 James Madison	JMU Stadium; Harrisonburg, VA (rivalry)	L 18–24	14,750	
October 30		at No. 4 Delaware	Delaware Stadium; Newark, DE (rivalry)	L 21–62	18,005	
November 6		Brown	Cary Field; Williamsburg, VA	L 22–23	6,000	
November 13		East Carolina	Cary Field; Williamsburg, VA	L 27–31	10,800	
November 20		at Richmond	City Stadium; Richmond, VA (I-64 Bowl)	W 28–17	8,123	
Rankings from NCAA Division I-AA Football Committee Poll released prior to the game; All times are in Eastern time
