= 1982 Northeastern Huskies football team =

American college football season

1982 Northeastern Huskies football
- Conference: Independent
- Record: 3–6
- Head coach: Paul Pawlak (2nd season)
- Home stadium: Parsons Field

1982 NCAA Division I-AA independents football standings
	Conf.			Overall
Team	W	L	T	W		L		T
No. 3 Delaware ^		–		12	–	2	–	0
No. 4 Tennessee State ^		–		10	–	1	–	1
No. 13 Holy Cross		–		8	–	3	–	0
James Madison		–		8	–	3	–	0
No. 9 Colgate ^		–		8	–	4	–	0
No. 20 Lafayette		–		7	–	3	–	0
Nicholls State		–		7	–	4	–	0
No. 18 Northwestern State		–		6	–	5	–	0
Western Kentucky		–		5	–	5	–	0
Bucknell		–		4	–	6	–	0
Lehigh		–		4	–	6	–	0
Southeastern Louisiana		–		4	–	7	–	0
Northeastern		–		3	–	6	–	0
Alabama State		–		2	–	6	–	1
William & Mary		–		3	–	8	–	0
North Texas State		–		2	–	9	–	0
Richmond		–		0	–	10	–	0
^ – NCAA Division I-AA playoff participant; Rankings from NCAA Division I-AA Football Committee

The 1982 Northeastern Huskies football team was an American football team that represented Northeastern University as an independent during the 1982 NCAA Division I-AA football season. Led by second-year head coach Paul Pawlak, the team compiled a 3–6 record.

== Schedule ==
Date	Opponent	Site	Result	Attendance	Source
September 18	at Connecticut	Memorial Stadium; Storrs, CT	L 17–24	5,678	
September 25	C. W. Post	Parsons Field; Brookline, MA	W 14–10	3,200	
October 2	at Springfield	Benedum Field; Springfield, MA	L 14–21	1,302	
October 9	Rhode Island	Parsons Field; Brookline, MA	L 13–14	1,200	
October 16	American International	Parsons Field; Brookline, MA	W 30–10	2,100	
October 23	at New Hampshire	Cowell Stadium; Durham, NH	L 22–24	9,225	
October 30	at Maine	Alumni Field; Orono, ME	L 0–31	7,200	
November 6	Central Connecticut	Parsons Field; Brookline, MA	W 59–0	5,750	
November 13	at Delaware State	Alumni Stadium; Dover, DE	L 7–15	2,700	
