= 1982 Northwestern State Demons football team =

American college football season

1982 Northwestern State Demons football
- Conference: Independent
- Record: 6–5
- Head coach: A. L. Williams (8th season)
- Home stadium: Harry Turpin Stadium

1982 NCAA Division I-AA independents football standings
	Conf.			Overall
Team	W	L	T	W		L		T
No. 3 Delaware ^		–		12	–	2	–	0
No. 4 Tennessee State ^		–		10	–	1	–	1
No. 13 Holy Cross		–		8	–	3	–	0
James Madison		–		8	–	3	–	0
No. 9 Colgate ^		–		8	–	4	–	0
No. 20 Lafayette		–		7	–	3	–	0
Nicholls State		–		7	–	4	–	0
No. 18 Northwestern State		–		6	–	5	–	0
Western Kentucky		–		5	–	5	–	0
Bucknell		–		4	–	6	–	0
Lehigh		–		4	–	6	–	0
Southeastern Louisiana		–		4	–	7	–	0
Northeastern		–		3	–	6	–	0
Alabama State		–		2	–	6	–	1
William & Mary		–		3	–	8	–	0
North Texas State		–		2	–	9	–	0
Richmond		–		0	–	10	–	0
^ – NCAA Division I-AA playoff participant; Rankings from NCAA Division I-AA Football Committee

The 1982 Northwestern State Demons football team represented Northwestern State University as an independent during the 1982 NCAA Division I-AA football season. Led by eighth-year head coach A. L. Williams, the Demons compiled a record of 6–5.

== Schedule ==
Date	Opponent	Site	Result	Attendance	Source
September 4	Mississippi College	Harry Turpin Stadium; Natchitoches, LA	W 24–20		
September 11	at Angelo State	San Angelo Stadium; San Angelo, TX	L 17–26	8,500	
September 18	at Stephen F. Austin	Lumberjack Stadium; Nacogdoches, TX (Chief Caddo)	W 28–14		
September 25	Abilene Christian	Harry Turpin Stadium; Natchitoches, LA	W 35–30		
October 2	at East Texas State	Memorial Stadium; Commerce, TX	L 20–24	5,500	
October 9	at McNeese State	Cowboy Stadium; Lake Charles, LA (rivalry)	L 11–21	20,000	
October 16	Alcorn State	Harry Turpin Stadium; Natchitoches, LA	W 28–7	9,600	
October 23	vs. No. 4 Louisiana Tech	Independence Stadium; Shreveport, LA (rivalry)	L 0–33	17,626	
November 6	No. 10 Nicholls State	Harry Turpin Stadium; Natchitoches, LA (NSU Challenge)	W 38–6	4,500	
November 13	Southeastern Louisiana	Harry Turpin Stadium; Natchitoches, LA (rivalry)	W 31–3	4,000	
November 20	at No. 15 Northeast Louisiana	Malone Stadium; Monroe, LA (rivalry)	L 27–28	16,000	
Rankings from NCAA Division I-AA Football Committee Poll released prior to the game

== Roster ==
1982 Northwestern State Demons football team roster
Players
Coaches
Offense

Pos.	#	Name	Class
QB		Bobby Hebert	Sr
WR		Victor Oatis	Sr

Defense

Pos.	#	Name	Class
LB		Gary Reasons	Jr

Special teams

Pos.	#	Name	Class

Head coach

- A. L. Williams

Coordinators/assistant coaches

Legend

- (C) Team captain
- (S) Suspended
- (I) Ineligible
- Injured
- Redshirt
