= 1982 Richmond Spiders football team =

American college football season

1982 Richmond Spiders football
- Conference: Independent
- Record: 0–10
- Head coach: Dal Shealy (3rd season)
- Offensive coordinator: Jim Marshall (4th season)
- Home stadium: City Stadium

1982 NCAA Division I-AA independents football standings
	Conf.			Overall
Team	W	L	T	W		L		T
No. 3 Delaware ^		–		12	–	2	–	0
No. 4 Tennessee State ^		–		10	–	1	–	1
No. 13 Holy Cross		–		8	–	3	–	0
James Madison		–		8	–	3	–	0
No. 9 Colgate ^		–		8	–	4	–	0
No. 20 Lafayette		–		7	–	3	–	0
Nicholls State		–		7	–	4	–	0
No. 18 Northwestern State		–		6	–	5	–	0
Western Kentucky		–		5	–	5	–	0
Bucknell		–		4	–	6	–	0
Lehigh		–		4	–	6	–	0
Southeastern Louisiana		–		4	–	7	–	0
Northeastern		–		3	–	6	–	0
Alabama State		–		2	–	6	–	1
William & Mary		–		3	–	8	–	0
North Texas State		–		2	–	9	–	0
Richmond		–		0	–	10	–	0
^ – NCAA Division I-AA playoff participant; Rankings from NCAA Division I-AA Football Committee

The 1982 Richmond Spiders football team represented the University of Richmond in the 1982 NCAA Division I-AA football season. The Spiders were led by third year head coach Dal Shealy and played their home games at City Stadium. They were classified as Independent. The 1982 campaign marked Shealy's worst year as a head coach after Richmond finished with a winless 0–10 record.

== Schedule ==
Date	Time	Opponent	Site	Result	Attendance	Source
September 4		Virginia Tech	City Stadium; Richmond, VA	L 9–20	22,600	
September 11		at South Carolina	Williams–Brice Stadium; Columbia, SC	L 10–30	52,288	
September 18	1:30 p.m.	vs. Ohio	Ohio Stadium; Columbus, OH (Children's Hospital Benefit Bowl)	L 14–23	23,000	
September 25		at No. 15 West Virginia	Mountaineer Field; Morgantown, WV	L 10–43	48,461	
October 9		at East Carolina	Ficklen Memorial Stadium; Greenville, NC	L 14–35	19,521	
October 16	3:10 p.m.	at Louisville	Cardinal Stadium; Louisville, KY	L 0–35	16,381	
October 23		VMI	City Stadium; Richmond, VA (Tobacco Bowl, rivalry)	L 0–14	12,197	
October 30		Rutgers	City Stadium; Richmond, VA	L 14–20	10,132	
November 13	1:33 p.m.	North Texas State	City Stadium; Richmond, VA	L 13–22	8,869	
November 20		William & Mary	City Stadium; Richmond, VA (rivalry)	L 17–28	8,123	
Rankings from AP Poll released prior to the game; All times are in Eastern time
