= 1982 Lafayette Leopards football team =

American college football season

1982 Lafayette Leopards football
- Conference: Independent
- Record: 7–3
- Head coach: Bill Russo (2nd season)
- Captains: Bob Mahr; Ed Stahl
- Home stadium: Fisher Field

1982 NCAA Division I-AA independents football standings
	Conf.			Overall
Team	W	L	T	W		L		T
No. 3 Delaware ^		–		12	–	2	–	0
No. 4 Tennessee State ^		–		10	–	1	–	1
No. 13 Holy Cross		–		8	–	3	–	0
James Madison		–		8	–	3	–	0
No. 9 Colgate ^		–		8	–	4	–	0
No. 20 Lafayette		–		7	–	3	–	0
Nicholls State		–		7	–	4	–	0
No. 18 Northwestern State		–		6	–	5	–	0
Western Kentucky		–		5	–	5	–	0
Bucknell		–		4	–	6	–	0
Lehigh		–		4	–	6	–	0
Southeastern Louisiana		–		4	–	7	–	0
Northeastern		–		3	–	6	–	0
Alabama State		–		2	–	6	–	1
William & Mary		–		3	–	8	–	0
North Texas State		–		2	–	9	–	0
Richmond		–		0	–	10	–	0
^ – NCAA Division I-AA playoff participant; Rankings from NCAA Division I-AA Football Committee

The 1982 Lafayette Leopards football team was an American football team that represented Lafayette College as an independent during the 1982 NCAA Division I-AA football season. In their second year under head coach Bill Russo, the Leopards compiled a 7–3 record. Bob Mahr and Ed Stahl were the team captains. Though the team went unranked in the Division I-AA Football Committee poll during the season, the five-game winning streak at the end of the schedule secured a No. 20 rank in the final week of the poll, released November 24. Lafayette played home games at Fisher Field on College Hill in Easton, Pennsylvania.

== Schedule ==
Date	Time	Opponent	Site	Result	Attendance	Source
September 11		Rhode Island	Fisher Field; Easton, PA	L 10–20	9,500	
September 18	2:02 p.m.	at Army	Michie Stadium; West Point, NY	L 20–26	30,103–31,103	
September 25		at Columbia	Baker Field; New York, NY	W 53–23	3,525	
October 2		at Bucknell	Memorial Stadium; Lewisburg, PA	W 37–6	7,100	
October 9		at Maine	Alumni Field; Orono, ME	L 14–28	8,500	
October 16		No. 10 Penn	Fisher Field; Easton, PA	W 35–20	10,000	
October 23		Davidson	Fisher Field; Easton, PA	W 49–14	7,500	
November 6		at Princeton	Palmer Stadium; Princeton, NJ	W 47–37	12,417	
November 13		Kutztown	Fisher Field; Easton, PA	W 36–3	4,500	
November 22		Lehigh	Fisher Field; Easton, PA (The Rivalry)	W 34–6	18,000	
Rankings from NCAA Division I-AA Football Committee Poll released prior to the game; All times are in Eastern time
