= 1982 James Madison Dukes football team =

American college football season

1982 James Madison Dukes football
- Conference: Independent
- Record: 8–3
- Head coach: Challace McMillin (11th season)
- Home stadium: Madison Stadium

1982 NCAA Division I-AA independents football standings
	Conf.			Overall
Team	W	L	T	W		L		T
No. 3 Delaware ^		–		12	–	2	–	0
No. 4 Tennessee State ^		–		10	–	1	–	1
No. 13 Holy Cross		–		8	–	3	–	0
James Madison		–		8	–	3	–	0
No. 9 Colgate ^		–		8	–	4	–	0
No. 20 Lafayette		–		7	–	3	–	0
Nicholls State		–		7	–	4	–	0
No. 18 Northwestern State		–		6	–	5	–	0
Western Kentucky		–		5	–	5	–	0
Bucknell		–		4	–	6	–	0
Lehigh		–		4	–	6	–	0
Southeastern Louisiana		–		4	–	7	–	0
Northeastern		–		3	–	6	–	0
Alabama State		–		2	–	6	–	1
William & Mary		–		3	–	8	–	0
North Texas State		–		2	–	9	–	0
Richmond		–		0	–	10	–	0
^ – NCAA Division I-AA playoff participant; Rankings from NCAA Division I-AA Football Committee

The 1982 James Madison Dukes football team was an American football team that represented James Madison University during the 1982 NCAA Division I-AA football season as an independent. In their eleventh year under head coach Challace McMillin, the team compiled an 8–3 record.

== Schedule ==
Date	Opponent	Rank	Site	Result	Attendance	Source
September 4	New Hampshire		JMU Stadium; Harrisonburg, VA	L 6–28	8,500	
September 11	Appalachian State		JMU Stadium; Harrisonburg, VA	W 39–35	7,750	
September 18	at Virginia		Scott Stadium; Charlottesville, VA	W 21–17	23,524	
September 25	East Tennessee State		JMU Stadium; Harrisonburg, VA	W 15–10	13,500	
October 2	at Davidson	No. 9	Richardson Stadium; Davidson, NC	W 35–7	2,800	
October 16	at VMI	No. T–10	Alumni Memorial Field; Lexington, VA	L 7–35	9,357	
October 23	William & Mary	No. 20	JMU Stadium; Harrisonburg, VA (rivalry)	W 24–18	14,750	
October 30	at C. W. Post	No. 20	Greenvale, NY	W 32–16	4,840	
November 6	at No. 9 Furman	No. 18	Paladin Stadium; Greenville, SC	L 10–17	12,370	
November 13	Shippensburg		JMU Stadium; Harrisonburg, VA	W 52–22	8,000	
November 20	at Towson State		Towson Stadium; Towson, MD	W 42–24	3,400	
Rankings from NCAA Division I-AA Football Committee Poll released prior to the game
