= 1982 Holy Cross Crusaders football team =

American college football season

1982 Holy Cross Crusaders football
- Conference: Independent
- Record: 8–3
- Head coach: Rick E. Carter (2nd season)
- Defensive coordinator: Mark Duffner (2nd season)
- Captains: Brian Kelley; Doug O'Donnell
- Home stadium: Fitton Field

1982 NCAA Division I-AA independents football standings
	Conf.			Overall
Team	W	L	T	W		L		T
No. 3 Delaware ^		–		12	–	2	–	0
No. 4 Tennessee State ^		–		10	–	1	–	1
No. 13 Holy Cross		–		8	–	3	–	0
James Madison		–		8	–	3	–	0
No. 9 Colgate ^		–		8	–	4	–	0
No. 20 Lafayette		–		7	–	3	–	0
Nicholls State		–		7	–	4	–	0
No. 18 Northwestern State		–		6	–	5	–	0
Western Kentucky		–		5	–	5	–	0
Bucknell		–		4	–	6	–	0
Lehigh		–		4	–	6	–	0
Southeastern Louisiana		–		4	–	7	–	0
Northeastern		–		3	–	6	–	0
Alabama State		–		2	–	6	–	1
William & Mary		–		3	–	8	–	0
North Texas State		–		2	–	9	–	0
Richmond		–		0	–	10	–	0
^ – NCAA Division I-AA playoff participant; Rankings from NCAA Division I-AA Football Committee

The 1982 Holy Cross Crusaders football team was an American football team that represented the College of the Holy Cross as an independent during the 1982 NCAA Division I-AA football season.

In their second year under head coach Rick E. Carter, the Crusaders compiled an 8–3 record. Terry Malone, Brian Kelley and Doug O'Donnell were the team captains.

This was the Crusaders' first year in Division I-AA, after having competed in the top-level Division I-A and its predecessors since 1896.

A four-game winning streak to open the campaign put Holy Cross in the weekly national rankings in its first year in Division I-AA, rising as high as No. 4. The Crusaders ended the year ranked No. 13, following a rivalry loss to Tangerine Bowl-bound Boston College of Division I-A.

Holy Cross played its home games at Fitton Field on the college campus in Worcester, Massachusetts.

== Schedule ==
Date	Opponent	Rank	Site	Result	Attendance	Source
September 11	New Hampshire		Fitton Field; Worcester, MA	W 28–0	12,651	
September 18	UMass		Fitton Field; Worcester, MA	W 27–14	13,251	
September 25	Dartmouth^{†}	No. 6	Fitton Field; Worcester, MA	W 28–12	18,861	
October 2	at Yale	No. 5	Yale Bowl; New Haven, CT	W 10–6	19,200	
October 9	at No. 6 Colgate	No. 4	Andy Kerr Stadium; Hamilton, NY	L 17–21	10,000	
October 16	Connecticut	No. 9	Fitton Field; Worcester, MA	W 10–7	11,441	
October 23	at Brown	No. 9	Brown Stadium; Providence, RI	W 17–6	15,100	
October 30	at Boston University	No. 6	Nickerson Field; Boston, MA	W 34–21	9,130	
November 6	Harvard^	No. 7	Fitton Field; Worcester, MA	L 17–24	20,681	
November 13	Maine		Fitton Field; Worcester, MA	W 21–7	11,111	
November 20	at Boston College	No. 14	Alumni Stadium; Chestnut Hill, MA (rivalry)	L 10–35	32,800	
^{†}Homecoming; ^ Family Weekend; Rankings from the latest NCAA Division I-AA poll released prior to the game
