= 1982 Southeastern Louisiana Lions football team =

American college football season

1982 Southeastern Louisiana Lions football
- Conference: Independent
- Record: 4–7
- Head coach: Oscar Lofton (3rd season)
- Home stadium: Strawberry Stadium

1982 NCAA Division I-AA independents football standings
	Conf.			Overall
Team	W	L	T	W		L		T
No. 3 Delaware ^		–		12	–	2	–	0
No. 4 Tennessee State ^		–		10	–	1	–	1
No. 13 Holy Cross		–		8	–	3	–	0
James Madison		–		8	–	3	–	0
No. 9 Colgate ^		–		8	–	4	–	0
No. 20 Lafayette		–		7	–	3	–	0
Nicholls State		–		7	–	4	–	0
No. 18 Northwestern State		–		6	–	5	–	0
Western Kentucky		–		5	–	5	–	0
Bucknell		–		4	–	6	–	0
Lehigh		–		4	–	6	–	0
Southeastern Louisiana		–		4	–	7	–	0
Northeastern		–		3	–	6	–	0
Alabama State		–		2	–	6	–	1
William & Mary		–		3	–	8	–	0
North Texas State		–		2	–	9	–	0
Richmond		–		0	–	10	–	0
^ – NCAA Division I-AA playoff participant; Rankings from NCAA Division I-AA Football Committee

The 1982 Southeastern Louisiana Lions football team was an American football team that represented Southeastern Louisiana University as an independent during the 1982 NCAA Division I-AA football season. Led by third-year head coach Oscar Lofton, the Lions compiled an 4–7 record.

== Schedule ==
Date	Opponent	Site	Result	Attendance	Source
September 11	at McNeese State	Cowboy Stadium; Lake Charles, LA	W 17–7	19,756	
September 18	at UCF	Orlando Stadium; Orlando, FL	W 24–14	8,196	
September 25	Stephen F. Austin	Strawberry Stadium; Hammond, LA	L 0–30	9,000	
October 2	Southwest Texas State	Strawberry Stadium; Hammond, LA	L 21–34	4,000	
October 9	Troy State	Strawberry Stadium; Hammond, LA	W 21–7	7,200	
October 16	Texas Southern	Strawberry Stadium; Hammond, LA	W 31–0	4,000	
October 23	at No. 11 Northeast Louisiana	Malone Stadium; Monroe, LA	L 0–42	17,950	
October 30	at No. 10 Jackson State	Mississippi Veterans Memorial Stadium; Jackson, MS	L 13–30	14,578	
November 6	Southern	Strawberry Stadium; Hammond, LA	L 19–26	10,000	
November 13	at Northwestern State	Harry Turpin Stadium; Natchitoches, LA (rivalry)	L 3–31	4,000	
November 20	at Nicholls State	John L. Guidry Stadium; Thibodaux, LA (rivalry)	L 14–20	4,600	
Rankings from Associated Press Poll released prior to the game
