= 1982 Nicholls State Colonels football team =

American college football season

1982 Nicholls State Colonels football
- Conference: Independent
- Record: 7–4
- Head coach: Sonny Jackson (2nd season)
- Home stadium: John L. Guidry Stadium

1982 NCAA Division I-AA independents football standings
	Conf.			Overall
Team	W	L	T	W		L		T
No. 3 Delaware ^		–		12	–	2	–	0
No. 4 Tennessee State ^		–		10	–	1	–	1
No. 13 Holy Cross		–		8	–	3	–	0
James Madison		–		8	–	3	–	0
No. 9 Colgate ^		–		8	–	4	–	0
No. 20 Lafayette		–		7	–	3	–	0
Nicholls State		–		7	–	4	–	0
No. 18 Northwestern State		–		6	–	5	–	0
Western Kentucky		–		5	–	5	–	0
Bucknell		–		4	–	6	–	0
Lehigh		–		4	–	6	–	0
Southeastern Louisiana		–		4	–	7	–	0
Northeastern		–		3	–	6	–	0
Alabama State		–		2	–	6	–	1
William & Mary		–		3	–	8	–	0
North Texas State		–		2	–	9	–	0
Richmond		–		0	–	10	–	0
^ – NCAA Division I-AA playoff participant; Rankings from NCAA Division I-AA Football Committee

The 1982 Nicholls State Colonels football team represented Nicholls State University as an independent during the 1982 NCAA Division I-AA football season. Led by second-year head coach Sonny Jackson, the Colonels compiled a record of 7–4. Nicholls State played home games at John L. Guidry Stadium in Thibodaux, Louisiana.

== Schedule ==
Date	Opponent	Rank	Site	Result	Attendance	Source
September 4	at Texas Southern		Robertson Stadium; Houston, TX	W 14–6	5,000	
September 11	Northeast Louisiana		John L. Guidry Stadium; Thibodaux, LA	L 14–39	6,598	
September 18	at Southwest Texas State		Bobcat Stadium; San Marcos, TX (rivalry)	L 7–14	9,000	
September 25	Troy State		John L. Guidry Stadium; Thibodaux, LA	W 10–3	6,100	
October 2	at Jackson State		Mississippi Veterans Memorial Stadium; Jackson, MS	W 21–17	13,294	
October 9	at No. 8 Southern		A. W. Mumford Stadium; Baton Rouge, LA	W 28–14	23,660	
October 23	UCF^{†}		John L. Guidry Stadium; Thibodaux, LA	W 60–10	8,500	
October 30	at Southwest Missouri State	No. 15	Briggs Stadium; Springfield, MO	W 30–19	3,900	
November 6	at Northwestern State	No. 10	Harry Turpin Stadium; Natchitoches, LA (rivalry)	L 6–38	4,500	
November 13	Grambling State		John L. Guidry Stadium; Thibodaux, LA	L 15–33	12,200	
November 20	Southeastern Louisiana		John L. Guidry Stadium; Thibodaux, LA (rivalry)	W 20–14	4,600	
^{†}Homecoming; Rankings from NCAA Division I-AA Football Committee Poll released prior to the game
