= 1982 NCAA Division I-AA Football Championship Game =

College football game

1982 NCAA Division I-AA Football Championship
- I-AA National Championship Game; Pioneer Bowl
| Eastern Kentucky Colonels | Delaware Fightin' Blue Hens |
| (12–0) | (12–1) |
| Ohio Valley | Independent |
| 17 | 14 |
| Head coach: Roy Kidd | Head coach: Tubby Raymond |
| NCAA / Seed; 1 / 1 | NCAA / Seed; 3 / 3 |
| | 1 | 2 | 3 | 4 | Total |
|---|---|---|---|---|---|
| Eastern Kentucky | 0 | 10 | 7 | 0 | 17 |
| Delaware | 0 | 0 | 0 | 14 | 14 |
- Date: December 18, 1982
- Season: 1982
- Stadium: Memorial Stadium
- Location: Wichita Falls, Texas
- Attendance: 11,257

United States TV coverage
- Network: CBS Sports
- Announcers: Lindsey Nelson (play-by-play), Steve Davis (color)

The 1982 NCAA Division I-AA Football Championship Game was a postseason college football game between the Eastern Kentucky Colonels and the Delaware Fightin' Blue Hens. The game was played on December 18, 1982, at Memorial Stadium in Wichita Falls, Texas. The culminating game of the 1982 NCAA Division I-AA football season, it was won by Eastern Kentucky, 17–14.

The game was also known as the Pioneer Bowl, a name that had been used starting in 1971 for various NCAA playoff games held in Wichita Falls. The Colonels, making their fourth consecutive appearance in the I-AA championship game, became the first program to capture two I-AA titles, having previously won in 1979. To date, this is the Colonels’ most recent national championship victory and appearance.

== Teams ==
The participants of the Championship Game were the finalists of the 1982 I-AA Playoffs, which began with a 12-team bracket.

=== Eastern Kentucky Colonels ===
Eastern Kentucky finished their regular season with an undefeated 10–0 record (7–0 in conference). Ranked first in the final NCAA I-AA in-house poll and seeded first in the tournament, the Colonels received a first-round bye then defeated Idaho and fourth-seed Tennessee State to reach the final. This was the fourth appearance for Eastern Kentucky in a Division I-AA championship game, having won in 1979 and having lost in 1980 and 1981.

=== Delaware Fightin' Blue Hens ===
Delaware finished their regular season with a 10–1 record; its only loss was an away game at Temple. Ranked third in the final NCAA I-AA in-house poll and seeded third in the tournament, the Fightin' Blue Hens received a first-round bye then defeated Colgate and second-seed Louisiana Tech to reach the final. This was the first appearance for Delaware in a Division I-AA championship game, though the team had recently been the 1979 Division II champion before moving up to Division I-AA in 1980.

== Game summary ==
=== Scoring summary ===
Scoring summary

| Quarter | Time | Drive | | | Team | Scoring information | Score | |
| Quarter | Time | Plays | Yards | TOP | Team | Scoring information | EKU | DEL |
|---|---|---|---|---|---|---|---|---|
| 2 | 9:40 | | | | EKU | Delaware FG attempt blocked by Gus Parks, Richard Bell returned 77 yards for touchdown, Jamie Lovett kick good | 7 | 0 |
| 2 | 3:10 | | 33 | | EKU | 37-yard field goal by Lovett | 10 | 0 |
| 3 | 13:28 | 4 | 21 | | EKU | Nick Yeast 1-yard touchdown run, Lovett kick good | 17 | 0 |
| 4 | 9:35 | 1 | 20 | | DEL | Mark Steimer 20-yard touchdown reception from Kelvin Phelan, 2-point run by Rick Titus failed† | 17 | 6 |
| 4 | 5:38 | 3 | 55 | | DEL | Tim Sager 5-yard touchdown reception from Rick Scully, 2-point pass good (Steimer from Scully) | 17 | 14 |
| "TOP" = time of possession. For other American football terms, see Glossary of American football. | | | | | | | 17 | 14 |

† Delaware's attempt to kick the extra point was blocked, but Eastern Kentucky was ruled offside on the play. Delaware then attempted a two-point conversion, with the ball being snapped 1 1/2 yards from the end zone.

=== Game statistics ===
| | 1 | 2 | 3 | 4 | Total |
|---|---|---|---|---|---|
| Colonels | 0 | 10 | 7 | 0 | 17 |
| Fightin' Blue Hens | 0 | 0 | 0 | 14 | 14 |

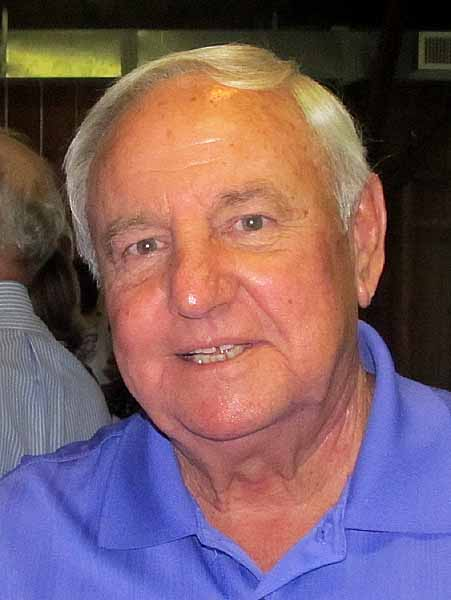
Eastern Kentucky head coach Roy Kidd in 2011

| Statistics | EKU | DEL |
|---|---|---|
| First downs | 13 | 18 |
| Plays–yards | 63–270 | 73–351 |
| Rushes–yards | 50–209 | 41–160 |
| Passing yards | 61 | 191 |
| Passing: comp–att–int | 6–13–1 | 13–32–0 |
| Time of possession | 31:41 | 28:19 |

| Team | Category | Player | Statistics |
|---|---|---|---|
| Eastern Kentucky | Passing | Tuck Woolum | 6–13, 61 yds, 1 INT |
| Eastern Kentucky | Rushing | Terrence Thompson | 24 car, 112 yds |
| Eastern Kentucky | Receiving | Steve Bird | 3 rec, 28 yds |
| Delaware | Passing | Rick Scully | 12–31, 171 yds, 1 TD |
| Delaware | Rushing | Cliff Clement | 7 car, 42 yds |
| Delaware | Receiving | Cliff Clement | 5 rec, 60 yds |
