= 1982 Delaware Fightin' Blue Hens football team =

American college football season

1982 Delaware Fightin' Blue Hens football

NCAA Division I-AA Championship, L 14–17 vs. Eastern Kentucky
- Conference: Independent
- Record: 12–2
- Head coach: Tubby Raymond (17th season)
- Offensive coordinator: Ted Kempski (15th season)
- Offensive scheme: Delaware Wing-T
- Base defense: 5–2
- Captain: Paul Brown
- Home stadium: Delaware Stadium

1982 NCAA Division I-AA independents football standings
	Conf.			Overall
Team	W	L	T	W		L		T
No. 3 Delaware ^		–		12	–	2	–	0
No. 4 Tennessee State ^		–		10	–	1	–	1
No. 13 Holy Cross		–		8	–	3	–	0
James Madison		–		8	–	3	–	0
No. 9 Colgate ^		–		8	–	4	–	0
No. 20 Lafayette		–		7	–	3	–	0
Nicholls State		–		7	–	4	–	0
No. 18 Northwestern State		–		6	–	5	–	0
Western Kentucky		–		5	–	5	–	0
Bucknell		–		4	–	6	–	0
Lehigh		–		4	–	6	–	0
Southeastern Louisiana		–		4	–	7	–	0
Northeastern		–		3	–	6	–	0
Alabama State		–		2	–	6	–	1
William & Mary		–		3	–	8	–	0
North Texas State		–		2	–	9	–	0
Richmond		–		0	–	10	–	0
^ – NCAA Division I-AA playoff participant; Rankings from NCAA Division I-AA Football Committee

The 1982 Delaware Fightin' Blue Hens football team was an American football team that represented the University of Delaware as an independent during the 1982 NCAA Division I-AA football season. Delaware ended the regular season ranked No. 3 in the nation, and made it to the Division I-AA national championship game, where the Hens lost by 3 points.

In their 17th year under head coach Tubby Raymond, the Hens compiled a 12–2 record (10–1 regular season). Paul Brown was the team captain.

The Hens suffered their only regular-season loss, to Division I-A Temple, in their second week of play, just before the first week of weekly rankings. As their 11-game win streak developed, however, they rapidly climbed the national Top 20, reaching as high as No. 2 and settling as the No. 3 team. Delaware had a first-round playoff bye and won two playoff games before losing the Pioneer Bowl national championship game.

Delaware played its home games at Delaware Stadium on the university campus in Newark, Delaware.

== Schedule ==
Date	Opponent	Rank	Site	Result	Attendance	Source
September 11	Western Kentucky		Delaware Stadium; Newark, DE	W 31–0	16,682	
September 18	at Temple		Veterans Stadium; Philadelphia, PA	L 0–22	25,463	
September 25	Princeton		Delaware Stadium; Newark, DE	W 35–17	18,147	
October 2	at Lehigh		Taylor Stadium; Bethlehem, PA (rivalry)	W 20–19	14,000	
October 9	at UMass	No. 11	Alumni Stadium; Hadley, MA	W 14–13	10,411	
October 16	C.W. Post	No. 4	Delaware Stadium; Newark, DE	W 48–7	18,868	
October 23	Towson State^{†}	No. 3	Delaware Stadium; Newark, DE	W 51–7	20,232	
October 30	William & Mary	No. 4	Delaware Stadium; Newark, DE (rivalry)	W 62–21	18,005	
November 13	West Chester	No. 4	Delaware Stadium; Newark, DE (rivalry)	W 55–13	20,012	
November 20	at Bucknell	No. 2	Memorial Stadium; Lewisburg, PA	W 46–6	14,224	
November 26	Connecticut	No. 3	Delaware Stadium; Newark, DE	W 13–7	13,062	
December 4	No. 9 Colgate	No. 3	Delaware Stadium; Newark, DE (NCAA Division I-AA Quarterfinal)	W 20–13	11,448	
December 11	at No. 2 Louisiana Tech	No. 3	Joe Aillet Stadium; Ruston, LA (NCAA Division I-AA Semifinal)	W 17–0	8,000	
December 18	vs. No. 1 Eastern Kentucky	No. 3	Memorial Stadium; Wichita Falls, TX (NCAA Division I-AA Championship Game—Pioneer Bowl)	L 14–17	11,257	
^{†}Homecoming; Rankings from NCAA Division I-AA Football Committee Poll released prior to the game
