= Robert Pickett =

Robert Pickett may refer to:

- Bobby Pickett (Robert George Pickett, 1938–2007), American singer also known Bobby "Boris" Pickett
- Bob Pickett (Robert A. Pickett, 1932–2010), head coach of the University of Massachusetts Amherst football team
- Robert W. Pickett (born c. 1953), gunman in the 2001 White House shooting
