= 1982 Delaware State Hornets football team =

American college football season

1982 Delaware State Hornets football
- Conference: Mid-Eastern Athletic Conference
- Record: 4–7 (2–3 MEAC)
- Head coach: Joe Purzycki (2nd season)
- Defensive coordinator: Bill Collick (2nd season)
- Home stadium: Alumni Stadium

1982 Mid-Eastern Athletic Conference football standings
	Conf.					Overall
Team	W		L		T	W		L		T
No. 7 South Carolina State $^	4	–	1	–	0	9	–	3	–	0
Florida A&M	4	–	1	–	0	6	–	5	–	0
Bethune–Cookman	3	–	2	–	0	5	–	5	–	0
Howard	2	–	3	–	0	6	–	5	–	0
Delaware State	2	–	3	–	0	4	–	7	–	0
North Carolina A&T	0	–	5	–	0	2	–	8	–	0
$ – Conference champion; ^ – NCAA Division I-AA playoff participant; Rankings from NCAA Division I-AA Football Committee poll

The 1982 Delaware State Hornets football team represented Delaware State College (now known as Delaware State University) as a member of the Mid-Eastern Athletic Conference (MEAC) during the 1982 NCAA Division I-AA football season. Led by second-year head coach Joe Purzycki, the Hornets compiled an overall record of 4–7, with a mark of 2–3 in conference play, and finished tied for fourth in the MEAC.

== Schedule ==
Date	Opponent	Site	Result	Attendance	Source
September 11	South Carolina State	Alumni Stadium; Dover, DE	W 17–7	5,000	
September 19	Florida A&M	Alumni Stadium; Dover, DE	L 23–39	5,000	
September 24	at West Chester State*	John A. Farrell Stadium; West Chester, PA	L 21–41	5,025	
October 2	at Bethune–Cookman	Memorial Stadium; Daytona Beach, FL	L 24–27	3,642	
October 9	at Howard	Howard Stadium; Washington, DC	L 14–22	6,700	
October 16	at North Carolina A&T	Aggie Stadium; Greensboro, NC	W 20–3	5,100	
October 23	Virginia State*	Alumni Stadium; Dover, DE	W 15–14	5,010	
October 30	at Towson State*	Towson Stadium; Towson, MD	L 21–35	1,451	
November 6	Central State (OH)*	Alumni Stadium; Dover, DE	L 31–37	3,500	
November 13	Northeastern*	Alumni Stadium; Dover, DE	W 15–7	2,700	
November 20	Liberty Baptist*	Alumni Stadium; Dover, DE	L 22–35	2,500	
*Non-conference game
