= Bill Bowes (American football) =

American football player and coach (born 1943)

Biographical details
- Born: October 17, 1943 (age 83); Blanchard, Pennsylvania, U.S.

Playing career
- 1962–1964: Penn State

Coaching career (HC unless noted)
- 1965: Penn State (assistant freshmen)
- 1966–1967: New Hampshire (OL)
- 1968–1971: Boston College (OL)
- 1972–1998: New Hampshire

Head coaching record
- Overall: 175–106–5
- Tournaments: 1–2 (NCAA D-II playoffs); 0–2 (NCAA D-I-AA playoffs)

Accomplishments and honors

Championships
- 4 Yankee (1975–1976, 1991, 1994)
- College Football Hall of Fame; Inducted in 2016 (profile)

Bill Bowes (born October 17, 1943) is an American former college football player and coach. He served as the head football coach at the University of New Hampshire for 27 seasons, from 1972 to 1998, compiling a record of 175–106–5. Bowes is the longest-tenured and all-time winningest head coach for the New Hampshire Wildcats football team. His teams won four Yankee Conference championships and two divisional championships. Bowes played college football at Pennsylvania State University, lettering for the Nittany Lions from 1962 to 1964.

== Head coaching record ==
Year	Team	Overall	Conference	Standing	Bowl/playoffs	NCAA^{#}	TSN^{°}
New Hampshire Wildcats (Yankee Conference) (1972–1996)
1972	New Hampshire	4–5	2–3	4th			
1973	New Hampshire	4–5	2–3	4th			
1974	New Hampshire	5–4	3–3	T–3rd			
1975	New Hampshire	9–3	5–0	1st	L NCAA Division II Semifinal†		
1976	New Hampshire	8–3	4–1	1st	L NCAA Division II Quarterfinal		
1977	New Hampshire	8–2	3–2	3rd			
1978	New Hampshire	6–4–1	1–3–1	5th			
1979	New Hampshire	5–4–2	2–2–1	4th			
1980	New Hampshire	6–4	2–3	4th			
1981	New Hampshire	7–3	2–3	4th		10	
1982	New Hampshire	4–6	1–4	6th			
1983	New Hampshire	7–3	3–2	3rd		20	
1984	New Hampshire	9–2	3–2	3rd		11	
1985	New Hampshire	6–4	2–3	T–3rd			
1986	New Hampshire	7–4	4–3	4th			
1987	New Hampshire	7–3	4–3	4th			
1988	New Hampshire	6–5	4–4	T–3rd		20	
1989	New Hampshire	7–3	5–3	T–4th			
1990	New Hampshire	7–3–1	5–3	T–2nd		T–19	
1991	New Hampshire	9–3	7–1	T–1st	L NCAA Division I-AA First Round	11	
1992	New Hampshire	5–5–1	3–5	7th			
1993	New Hampshire	6–5	4–4	4th (New England)			
1994	New Hampshire	10–2	8–0	1st (New England)	L NCAA Division I-AA First Round		12
1995	New Hampshire	6–5	4–4	3rd (New England)			
1996	New Hampshire	8–3	6–2	1st (New England)			18
New Hampshire Wildcats (Atlantic 10 Conference) (1997–1998)
1997	New Hampshire	5–6	5–3	1st (New England)			
1998	New Hampshire	4–7	3–5	T–3rd (New England)			
New Hampshire:		175–106–5					
Total:		175–106–5					
National championship Conference title Conference division title or championship game berth

†The 1975 semifinal game was the Grantland Rice Bowl.
