= 1982 Alcorn State Braves football team =

American college football season

1982 Alcorn State Braves football
- Conference: Southwestern Athletic Conference
- Record: 5–6 (3–3 SWAC)
- Head coach: Marino Casem (19th season)
- Home stadium: Henderson Stadium

1982 Southwestern Athletic Conference football standings
	Conf.					Overall
Team	W		L		T	W		L		T
No. 8 Jackson State $^	6	–	0	–	0	9	–	3	–	0
Southern	5	–	1	–	0	8	–	3	–	0
No. 10 Grambling State	4	–	2	–	0	8	–	3	–	0
Alcorn State	3	–	3	–	0	5	–	6	–	0
Mississippi Valley State	2	–	4	–	0	5	–	5	–	0
Texas Southern	1	–	5	–	0	1	–	9	–	1
Prairie View A&M	0	–	6	–	0	1	–	10	–	0
$ – Conference champion; ^ – NCAA Division I-AA playoff participant; Rankings from NCAA Division I-AA Football Committee poll

The 1982 Alcorn State Braves football team represented Alcorn State University as a member of the Southwestern Athletic Conference (SWAC) during the 1982 NCAA Division I-AA football season. Led by 19th-year head coach Marino Casem, the Braves compiled an overall record of 5–6, with a conference record of 3–3, and finished fourth in the SWAC.

== Schedule ==
Date	Opponent	Site	Result	Attendance	Source
September 11	vs. Alabama State*	Ladd Stadium; Mobile, AL (Gulf Coast Classic)	W 21–6	13,510	
September 18	vs. Grambling State	Independence Stadium; Shreveport, LA (Red River Classic)	L 14–31	40,333	
September 25	Angelo State*	Henderson Stadium; Lorman, MS	L 9–28	3,700	
October 2	at South Carolina State*	State College Stadium; Orangeburg, SC	L 0–20	8,320	
October 9	Texas Southern	Henderson Stadium; Lorman, MS	W 15–12	4,780	
October 16	at Northwestern State*	Harry Turpin Stadium; Natchitoches, LA	L 7–28	9,600	
October 23	Southern	Henderson Stadium; Lorman, MS	L 12–17	11,355	
October 30	at Florida A&M*	Bragg Memorial Stadium; Tallahassee, FL	W 23–13	25,333	
November 6	at Mississippi Valley State	Magnolia Stadium; Itta Bena, MS	W 41–34	9,043	
November 13	at Prairie View A&M	Edward L. Blackshear Field; Prairie View, TX	W 46–6	4,000	
November 20	No. 8 Jackson State	Henderson Stadium; Lorman, MS (rivalry)	L 16–20	11,748	
*Non-conference game; Rankings from NCAA Division I-AA Football Committee Poll released prior to the game
