= 1982 Colgate Red Raiders football team =

American college football season

1982 Colgate Red Raiders football
- Conference: Independent
- Record: 8–4
- Head coach: Frederick Dunlap (7th season)
- Captains: Mark Owens; Dave Wolf
- Home stadium: Andy Kerr Stadium

1982 NCAA Division I-AA independents football standings
	Conf.			Overall
Team	W	L	T	W		L		T
No. 3 Delaware ^		–		12	–	2	–	0
No. 4 Tennessee State ^		–		10	–	1	–	1
No. 13 Holy Cross		–		8	–	3	–	0
James Madison		–		8	–	3	–	0
No. 9 Colgate ^		–		8	–	4	–	0
No. 20 Lafayette		–		7	–	3	–	0
Nicholls State		–		7	–	4	–	0
No. 18 Northwestern State		–		6	–	5	–	0
Western Kentucky		–		5	–	5	–	0
Bucknell		–		4	–	6	–	0
Lehigh		–		4	–	6	–	0
Southeastern Louisiana		–		4	–	7	–	0
Northeastern		–		3	–	6	–	0
Alabama State		–		2	–	6	–	1
William & Mary		–		3	–	8	–	0
North Texas State		–		2	–	9	–	0
Richmond		–		0	–	10	–	0
^ – NCAA Division I-AA playoff participant; Rankings from NCAA Division I-AA Football Committee

The 1982 Colgate Red Raiders football team was an American football team that represented Colgate University as an independent during the 1982 NCAA Division I-AA football season. Colgate ranked No. 9 nationally and qualified for the Division I-AA playoffs, but lost in the quarterfinal round.

In its seventh season under head coach Frederick Dunlap, the team compiled a 8–4 record (7–3 regular season). Dave Wolf and Mark Owens were the team captains.

This was Colgate's first year in Division I-AA, after having competed in the top-level Division I-A and its predecessors since 1890.

A five-game winning streak to open the campaign put the Red Raiders in the weekly national rankings in their first year in Division I-AA, rising as high as No. 2. A three-game losing streak then bounced them out of the rankings, but Colgate finished the year at No. 9 and qualified for the Division I-AA playoffs, where it lost in the quarterfinals.

The team played its home games at Andy Kerr Stadium in Hamilton, New York.

== Schedule ==
Date	Opponent	Rank	Site	Result	Attendance	Source
September 11	Connecticut		Andy Kerr Stadium; Hamilton, NY	W 31–17	5,700	
September 18	at Lehigh		Taylor Stadium; Bethlehem, PA	W 21–14	10,800	
September 25	at Cornell	No. 9	Schoellkopf Field; Ithaca, NY (rivalry)	W 21–6	13,013	
October 2	at Dartmouth	No. 7	Memorial Field; Hanover, NH	W 38–21	3,400	
October 9	No. 4 Holy Cross	No. 6	Andy Kerr Stadium; Hamilton, NY	W 21–17	10,000	
October 23	at Rutgers	No. 2	Rutgers Stadium; Piscataway, NJ	L 17–34	19,423	
October 30	at Syracuse	No. 8	Carrier Dome; Syracuse, NY (rivalry)	L 15–49	36,076	
November 6	at Penn	No. 12	Franklin Field; Philadelphia, PA	L 13–21	12,212	
November 13	Temple		Andy Kerr Stadium; Hamilton, NY	W 24–17	4,000	
November 20	at Boston University	No. 16	Nickerson Field; Boston, MA	W 22–21	1,887	
November 26	Boston University	No. 9	Andy Kerr Stadium; Hamilton, NY (Division I-AA playoffs)	W 21–7	2,500	
December 4	at No. 3 Delaware	No. 9	Delaware Stadium; Newark, DE (Division I-AA quarterfinal)	L 13–20	11,448	
Rankings from NCAA Division I-AA Football Committee Poll released prior to the game
