= 1982 Mississippi Valley State Delta Devils football team =

American college football season

1982 Mississippi Valley State Delta Devils football
- Conference: Southwestern Athletic Conference
- Record: 5–5 (2–4 SWAC)
- Head coach: Archie Cooley (3rd season)
- Home stadium: Magnolia Stadium

1982 Southwestern Athletic Conference football standings
	Conf.					Overall
Team	W		L		T	W		L		T
No. 8 Jackson State $^	6	–	0	–	0	9	–	3	–	0
Southern	5	–	1	–	0	8	–	3	–	0
No. 10 Grambling State	4	–	2	–	0	8	–	3	–	0
Alcorn State	3	–	3	–	0	5	–	6	–	0
Mississippi Valley State	2	–	4	–	0	5	–	5	–	0
Texas Southern	1	–	5	–	0	1	–	9	–	1
Prairie View A&M	0	–	6	–	0	1	–	10	–	0
$ – Conference champion; ^ – NCAA Division I-AA playoff participant; Rankings from NCAA Division I-AA Football Committee poll

The 1982 Mississippi Valley State Delta Devils football team represented Mississippi Valley State University as a member of the Southwestern Athletic Conference (SWAC) during the 1982 NCAA Division I-AA football season. Led by third-year head coach Archie Cooley, the Delta Devils compiled an overall record of 5–5, with a conference record of 2–4, and finished fifth in the SWAC.

== Schedule ==
Date	Opponent	Site	Result	Attendance	Source
September 11	Alabama A&M*	Magnolia Stadium; Itta Bena, MS	W 7–6	5,741	
September 18	at Arkansas–Pine Bluff*	Pumphrey Stadium; Pine Bluff, AR	W 24–13	4,500	
September 25	at Jackson State	Mississippi Veterans Memorial Stadium; Jackson, MS	L 17–44	30,180	
October 2	at Southern	A. W. Mumford Stadium; Baton Rouge, LA	L 14–31	23,985	
October 9	Alabama State*	Magnolia Stadium; Itta Bena, MS	W 23–6	5,100	
October 16	vs. No. 7 Grambling State	Independence Stadium; Shreveport, LA (Jubilee Classic)	L 14–21	10,230	
October 23	at Texas Southern	Rice Stadium; Houston, TX	W 28–21	8,500	
October 30	Prairie View A&M	Magnolia Stadium; Itta Bena, MS	W 14–13	7,180	
November 6	Alcorn State	Magnolia Stadium; Itta Bena, MS	L 34–41	9,041	
November 13	vs. No. 3 Tennessee State*	Liberty Bowl Memorial Stadium; Memphis, TN (Bluff City Classic)	L 41–63	22,000	
*Non-conference game; Rankings from NCAA Division I-AA Football Committee Poll released prior to the game
