= 1982 North Carolina A&T Aggies football team =

American college football season

1982 North Carolina A&T Aggies football
- Conference: Mid-Eastern Athletic Conference
- Record: 2–8 (0–5 MEAC)
- Head coach: Mo Forte (1st season)
- Home stadium: Aggie Stadium

1982 Mid-Eastern Athletic Conference football standings
	Conf.					Overall
Team	W		L		T	W		L		T
No. 7 South Carolina State $^	4	–	1	–	0	9	–	3	–	0
Florida A&M	4	–	1	–	0	6	–	5	–	0
Bethune–Cookman	3	–	2	–	0	5	–	5	–	0
Howard	2	–	3	–	0	6	–	5	–	0
Delaware State	2	–	3	–	0	4	–	7	–	0
North Carolina A&T	0	–	5	–	0	2	–	8	–	0
$ – Conference champion; ^ – NCAA Division I-AA playoff participant; Rankings from NCAA Division I-AA Football Committee poll

The 1982 North Carolina A&T Aggies football team represented North Carolina A&T State University as member of the Mid-Eastern Athletic Conference (MEAC) during the 1982 NCAA Division I-AA football season. Led by first-year head coach Mo Forte, the Aggies compiled an overall record of 2–8, with a mark of 0–5 in conference play, and finished last in the MEAC.

== Schedule ==
Date	Opponent	Site	Result	Attendance	Source
September 11	at Winston-Salem State*	Groves Stadium; Winston-Salem, NC (rivalry)	L 7–21	23,353	
September 18	South Carolina State	Aggie Stadium; Greensboro, NC (rivalry)	L 6–27	11,500	
September 25	Bethune–Cookman	Aggie Stadium; Greensboro, NC	L 23–38	4,000	
October 9	Hampton*	Aggie Stadium; Greensboro, NC	L 9–19	9,687	
October 16	Delaware State	Aggie Stadium; Greensboro, NC	L 3–20	5,100	
October 23	at Howard	RFK Stadium; Washington, DC	L 13–20	11,000	
October 30	Morgan State*	Aggie Stadium; Greensboro, NC	W 31–18	17,500	
November 6	vs. Florida A&M	Miami Orange Bowl; Miami, FL (Orange Blossom Classic)	L 7–35	17,019	
November 13	at North Carolina Central*	O'Kelly Stadium; Durham, NC (rivalry)	W 13–7	10,600	
November 20	at No. 3 Tennessee State*	Hale Stadium; Nashville, TN	L 6–34	8,000	
*Non-conference game; Rankings from NCAA Division I-AA Football Committee Poll released prior to the game
