= 1982 Tennessee State Tigers football team =

American college football season

1982 Tennessee State Tigers football

Black college national champion

NCAA Division I-AA Quarterfinal, L 7–13 vs. Eastern Kentucky
- Conference: Independent
- Record: 10–1–1
- Head coach: John Merritt (20th season)
- Home stadium: Hale Stadium; Dudley Field

1982 NCAA Division I-AA independents football standings
	Conf.			Overall
Team	W	L	T	W		L		T
No. 3 Delaware ^		–		12	–	2	–	0
No. 4 Tennessee State ^		–		10	–	1	–	1
No. 13 Holy Cross		–		8	–	3	–	0
James Madison		–		8	–	3	–	0
No. 9 Colgate ^		–		8	–	4	–	0
No. 20 Lafayette		–		7	–	3	–	0
Nicholls State		–		7	–	4	–	0
No. 18 Northwestern State		–		6	–	5	–	0
Western Kentucky		–		5	–	5	–	0
Bucknell		–		4	–	6	–	0
Lehigh		–		4	–	6	–	0
Southeastern Louisiana		–		4	–	7	–	0
Northeastern		–		3	–	6	–	0
Alabama State		–		2	–	6	–	1
William & Mary		–		3	–	8	–	0
North Texas State		–		2	–	9	–	0
Richmond		–		0	–	10	–	0
^ – NCAA Division I-AA playoff participant; Rankings from NCAA Division I-AA Football Committee

The 1982 Tennessee State Tigers football team represented Tennessee State University as an independent during the 1982 NCAA Division I-AA football season. Led by 20th-year head coach John Merritt, the Tigers compiled an overall record of 10–1–1. At the conclusion of the season, the Tigers were also recognized as black college national champion.

== Schedule ==
Date	Opponent	Rank	Site	Result	Attendance	Source
September 11	Jackson State		Dudley Field; Nashville, TN	W 21–0	22,000	
September 18	at Central State (OH)		McPherson Stadium; Wilberforce, OH	W 34–0	8,000	
September 25	at Texas Southern		Robertson Stadium; Houston, TX	T 20–20	8,121	
October 2	at Alabama State		Cramton Bowl; Montgomery, AL	W 42–0	11,200	
October 9	at No. 2 Grambling State	No. 18	Grambling Stadium; Grambling, LA	W 22–8	18,522	
October 16	No. 15 Chattanooga	No. 6	Hale Stadium; Nashville, TN	W 27–21	18,200	
October 23	Bethune–Cookman	No. T–5	Hale Stadium; Nashville, TN	W 41–11	10,000	
October 30	Southern^{†}	No. 3	Dudley Field; Nashville, TN	W 28–21	37,000	
November 13	vs. Mississippi Valley State	No. 3	Liberty Bowl Memorial Stadium; Memphis, TN (Bluff City Classic)	W 63–41	22,000	
November 20	North Carolina A&T	No. 3	Hale Stadium; Nashville, TN	W 34–6	8,000	
December 4	No. 5 Eastern Illinois	No. 4	Hale Stadium; Nashville, TN (NCAA Division I-AA Quarterfinal)	W 20–19		
December 11	at No. 1 Eastern Kentucky	No. 4	Hanger Field; Richmond, KY (NCAA Division I-AA Semifinal)	L 7–13	7,338	
^{†}Homecoming; Rankings from NCAA Division I-AA Football Committee Poll released prior to the game
