= 1982 Howard Bison football team =

American college football season

1982 Howard Bison football
- Conference: Mid-Eastern Athletic Conference
- Record: 6–5 (2–3 MEAC)
- Head coach: Floyd Keith (4th season)
- Defensive coordinator: Joe Taylor (1st season)
- Home stadium: Howard Stadium; RFK Stadium

1982 Mid-Eastern Athletic Conference football standings
	Conf.					Overall
Team	W		L		T	W		L		T
No. 7 South Carolina State $^	4	–	1	–	0	9	–	3	–	0
Florida A&M	4	–	1	–	0	6	–	5	–	0
Bethune–Cookman	3	–	2	–	0	5	–	5	–	0
Howard	2	–	3	–	0	6	–	5	–	0
Delaware State	2	–	3	–	0	4	–	7	–	0
North Carolina A&T	0	–	5	–	0	2	–	8	–	0
$ – Conference champion; ^ – NCAA Division I-AA playoff participant; Rankings from NCAA Division I-AA Football Committee poll

The 1982 Howard Bison football team represented Howard University as a member of the Mid-Eastern Athletic Conference (MEAC) during the 1982 NCAA Division I-AA football season. Led by fourth-year head coach Floyd Keith, the Bison compiled an overall record of 6–5, with a mark of 2–3 in conference play, and finished tied for fourth in the MEAC.

== Schedule ==
Date	Opponent	Site	Result	Attendance	Source
September 4	at Maine*	Alumni Field; Orono, ME	L 15–38	7,500	
September 11	vs. Cheyney State*	Franklin Field; Philadelphia, PA	W 41–14	22,500	
September 18	Bethune–Cookman	Howard Stadium; Washington, DC	L 9–19	7,600	
September 25	at South Carolina State	State College Stadium; Orangeburg, SC	L 0–50	9,841	
October 2	vs. Florida A&M	Gator Bowl Stadium; Jacksonville, FL	L 3–62	22,120	
October 9	Delaware State	Howard Stadium; Washington, DC	W 22–14	6,700	
October 16	at Virginia State*	Rogers Stadium; Ettrick, VA	W 13–9	16,000	
October 23	North Carolina A&T^{†}	RFK Stadium; Washington, DC	W 20–13	11,000	
October 30	at Norfolk State*	Foreman Field; Norfolk, VA	W 24–18	26,000	
November 13	Western Illinois*	Howard Stadium; Washington, DC	L 17–22	1,200	
November 20	Morgan State*	Howard Stadium; Washington, DC (rivalry)	W 42–19	6,400	
*Non-conference game; ^{†}Homecoming
