= Mo Forte =

American football player and coach (1947–2021)

Biographical details
- Born: March 1, 1947; Hannibal, Missouri, U.S.
- Died: February 26, 2021 (aged 73); Pine Bluff, Arkansas, U.S.

Playing career
- 1966–1968: Minnesota
- Position: Running back

Coaching career (HC unless noted)
- 1970–1975: Minnesota (RB)
- 1976–1977: Duke (WR)
- 1978–1979: Michigan State (WR/TE)
- 1980–1981: Arizona State (WR)
- 1982–1987: North Carolina A&T
- 1988–1992: Denver Broncos (RB)
- 1993–1994: Denver Broncos (WR)
- 1995–1996: Detroit Lions (RB)
- 1999–2002: Norfolk State
- 2004–2007: Arkansas–Pine Bluff

Head coaching record
- Overall: 57–90–1
- Tournaments: 0–1 (NCAA D-I-AA playoffs)

Accomplishments and honors

Championships
- 1 MEAC (1986); 1 SWAC West Division (2006)

Awards
- MEAC Coach of the Year (1986)

Merrill Maurice Forte (March 1, 1947 – February 26, 2021) was an American football player and coach. He served as the head coach at North Carolina Agricultural and Technical State University from 1982 to 1987, Norfolk State University from 1999 to 2002 and the University of Arkansas at Pine Bluff from 2004 to 2007. Forte compiled a career college football record of 57–90–1.

Forte died on February 26, 2021, in Pine Bluff, Arkansas.

== Head coaching record ==
=== Football ===
Year	Team	Overall	Conference	Standing	Bowl/playoffs	NCAA^{#}
North Carolina A&T Aggies (Mid-Eastern Athletic Conference) (1982–1987)
1982	North Carolina A&T	2–8	0–5	6th		
1983	North Carolina A&T	3–7–1	1–3	T–3rd		
1984	North Carolina A&T	2–8	1–3	4th		
1985	North Carolina A&T	6–5	1–3	4th		
1986	North Carolina A&T	9–3	4–1	1st	L NCAA Division I-AA First Round	20
1987	North Carolina A&T	3–8	1–4	5th		
North Carolina A&T:		25–39–1				
Norfolk State Spartans (Mid-Eastern Athletic Conference) (1999–2002)
1999	Norfolk State	2–9	1–7	8th		
2000	Norfolk State	3–8	2–6	T–7th		
2001	Norfolk State	5–6	3–5	T–6th		
2002	Norfolk State	5–6	2–6	T–7th		
Norfolk State:		15–29	8–24			
Arkansas–Pine Bluff Golden Lions (Southwestern Athletic Conference) (2004–2007)
2004	Arkansas–Pine Bluff	6–3	5–2	2nd (West)		
2005	Arkansas–Pine Bluff	3–8	3–6	T–3rd (West)		
2006	Arkansas–Pine Bluff	8–4	7–2	1st (West)		
2007	Arkansas–Pine Bluff	0–7 (Note: Arkansas–Pine Bluff finished the 2007 season with a 4–7 overall record and a 4–5 mark in conference place, but was forced in 2014 to vacate all four wins.)	0–5	4th (West)		
Arkansas–Pine Bluff:		17–22	15–15			
Total:		57–90–1				
National championship Conference title Conference division title or championship game berth
