= 1982 Connecticut Huskies football team =

American college football season

1982 Connecticut Huskies football

Yankee Conference co-champion
- Conference: Yankee Conference
- Record: 5–6 (3–2 Yankee)
- Head coach: Walt Nadzak (6th season)
- Home stadium: Memorial Stadium

1982 Yankee Conference football standings
	Conf.					Overall
Team	W		L		T	W		L		T
Maine +	3	–	2	–	0	7	–	4	–	0
Boston University +^	3	–	2	–	0	5	–	6	–	0
Connecticut +	3	–	2	–	0	5	–	6	–	0
UMass +	3	–	2	–	0	5	–	6	–	0
Rhode Island	2	–	3	–	0	7	–	4	–	0
New Hampshire	1	–	4	–	0	4	–	6	–	0
+ – Conference co-champions; ^ – NCAA Division I-AA playoff participant

The 1982 Connecticut Huskies football team represented the University of Connecticut in the 1982 NCAA Division I-AA football season. The Huskies were led by sixth-year head coach Walt Nadzak, and completed the season with a record of 5–6.

== Schedule ==
Date	Opponent	Site	Result	Attendance	Source
September 11	at Colgate*	Andy Kerr Stadium; Hamilton, NY	L 17–31	5,700	
September 18	Northeastern*	Memorial Stadium; Storrs, CT	W 24–17	5,678	
September 25	at Yale*	Yale Bowl; New Haven, CT	W 17–7	33,000	
October 2	at New Hampshire	Cowell Stadium; Durham, NH	W 20–17	8,435	
October 9	Lehigh*	Memorial Stadium; Storrs, CT	L 12–16	7,592	
October 16	at No. 9 Holy Cross*	Fitton Field; Worcester, MA	L 7–10	11,441	
October 23	Maine	Memorial Stadium; Storrs, CT	L 7–21	13,421	
October 30	at UMass	Alumni Stadium; Amherst, MA (rivalry)	L 14–30	9,932	
November 6	Boston University	Memorial Stadium; Storrs, CT	W 13–10	8,299	
November 13	Rhode Island	Memorial Stadium; Storrs, CT (rivalry)	W 26–21	3,063	
November 26	at No. 3 Delaware*	Delaware Stadium; Newark, DE	L 7–13	13,062	
*Non-conference game; Rankings from NCAA Division I-AA Football Committee Poll released prior to the game
