= Bob Pickett =

American football player and coach (1932–2010)

Biographical details
- Born: February 22, 1932
- Died: February 3, 2010 (aged 77); Daytona Beach, Florida, U.S.

Playing career
- 1957–1958: Maine
- Position: Quarterback

Coaching career (HC unless noted)
- 1959–1962: Laconia HS (NH)
- 1963–1964: Portsmouth HS (NH)
- 1965–1970: Maine (assistant)
- 1971–1977: UMass (DC)
- 1978–1983: UMass

Administrative career (AD unless noted)
- 1984–1997: UMass (associate AD)

Head coaching record
- Overall: 36–28 (college)
- Tournaments: 1–1 (NCAA D-I-AA playoffs)

Accomplishments and honors

Championships
- 4 Yankee (1978–1979, 1981–1982); 1 Lambert Cup (1978)

Awards
- 3× New Hampshire Coach of the Year; Stan Lomax-Irving T. Marsh Eastern Coach of the Year Award (1997); Boston Gridiron Club's Coach of the Year Award (1997); Henry Butova Award (1997); Johnny Vaught Life Time Achievement Award (1999)

Robert A. Pickett (February 22, 1932 – February 3, 2010) was an American football player and coach who served as the head football coach of at the University of Massachusetts Amherst from 1978 to 1983.

== Early life ==
Pickett attended high school at Cony High School in Augusta, Maine, where he graduated in 1952. He attended Maine Central Institute for one year after that, and then finished his education at the University of Maine where he graduated in 1959. Pickett played football for Maine and was their starting quarterback.

== Coaching career ==
Pickett began his coaching career as the head football and basketball coach at Laconia High School. In his first season, Laconia won the Division II state title, their second ever championship and their first since 1951. He coached at Portsmouth High School from 1962 until 1964, when he became an assistant coach at Maine. In 1971 he joined Dick MacPherson as the defensive coordinator at the University of Massachusetts Amherst. He was promoted to head coach following MacPherson's departure in 1978. In his first season as head coach, UMASS won the Yankee Conference championship and was runner-up finish in the NCAA Division I-AA Football Championship. He served as head coach until 1983, compiling a record of 36–28 overall record and winning four Yankee Conference championships.

== Later life ==
Pickett served as UMASS' associate athletic director until his retirement in 1997. He was the color commentator on radio broadcasts of Minutemen football from 1998 to 2003.

== Head coaching record ==
=== College ===
Year	Team	Overall	Conference	Standing	Bowl/playoffs	NCAA^{#}
UMass Minutemen (Yankee Conference) (1978–1983)
1978	UMass	9–4	5–0	1st	L NCAA Division I-AA Football Championship	T–4
1979	UMass	6–4	4–1	T–1st		
1980	UMass	7–3	4–1	2nd		T–10
1981	UMass	6–3	4–1	T–1st		T–10
1982	UMass	5–6	3–2	T–1st		
1983	UMass	3–8	2–3	T–4th		
UMass:		36–28				
Total:		36–28				
National championship Conference title Conference division title or championship game berth
^{#}Rankings from final NCAA I-AA Poll.
