= 1982 Maine Black Bears football team =

American college football season

1982 Maine Black Bears football

Yankee co-champion
- Conference: Yankee Conference
- Record: 7–4 (3–2 Yankee)
- Head coach: Ron Rogerson (2nd season)
- Offensive coordinator: Chris Raymond (2nd season)
- Home stadium: Alumni Field

1982 Yankee Conference football standings
	Conf.					Overall
Team	W		L		T	W		L		T
Maine +	3	–	2	–	0	7	–	4	–	0
Boston University +^	3	–	2	–	0	5	–	6	–	0
Connecticut +	3	–	2	–	0	5	–	6	–	0
UMass +	3	–	2	–	0	5	–	6	–	0
Rhode Island	2	–	3	–	0	7	–	4	–	0
New Hampshire	1	–	4	–	0	4	–	6	–	0
+ – Conference co-champions; ^ – NCAA Division I-AA playoff participant

The 1982 Maine Black Bears football team represented the University of Maine as a member of the Yankee Conference during the 1982 NCAA Division I-AA football season. Led by second-year head coach Ron Rogerson, the Black Bears compiled an overall record of 7–4 and a conference mark of 3–2, sharing the Yankee Conference title with Boston University, Connecticut, and UMass.

== Schedule ==
Date	Opponent	Site	Result	Attendance	Source
September 4	Howard*	Alumni Field; Orono, ME	W 38–15	7,500	
September 11	Lehigh*	Alumni Field; Orono, ME	W 14–6	6,000	
September 18	Rhode Island	Alumni Field; Orono, ME	L 55–58 ^{6OT}	6,250	
September 25	at Boston University	Nickerson Field; Boston, MA	L 45–48 ^{4OT}	6,403	
October 2	at Towson State*	Towson Stadium; Towson, MD	L 35–38	3,740	
October 9	Lafayette*	Alumni Field; Orono, ME	W 28–14	8,500	
October 16	UMass	Alumni Field; Orono, ME	W 42–24	9,800	
October 23	at Connecticut	Memorial Stadium; Storrs, CT	W 21–7	13,421	
October 30	Northeastern*	Alumni Field; Orono, ME	W 31–0	7,200	
November 6	at New Hampshire	Cowell Stadium; Durham, NH (rivalry)	W 31–14	9,758	
November 13	at Holy Cross*	Fitton Field; Worcester, MA	L 7–21	11,111	
*Non-conference game

== After the season ==
The following Black Bear was selected in the 1983 NFL draft after the season.

Round	Pick	Player	Position	NFL club
12	331	Lorenzo Bouier	Running back	Dallas Cowboys
