= 1982 Prairie View A&M Panthers football team =

American college football season

1982 Prairie View A&M Panthers football
- Conference: Southwestern Athletic Conference
- Record: 1–10 (0–6 SWAC)
- Head coach: James McKinley (1st season)
- Home stadium: Edward L. Blackshear Field

1982 Southwestern Athletic Conference football standings
| | Conf. | | | | | Overall |
| Team | W | | L | | T | W | | L | | T |
|---|---|---|---|---|---|---|---|---|---|---|
| No. 8 Jackson State $^ | 6 | – | 0 | – | 0 | 9 | – | 3 | – | 0 |
| Southern | 5 | – | 1 | – | 0 | 8 | – | 3 | – | 0 |
| No. 10 Grambling State | 4 | – | 2 | – | 0 | 8 | – | 3 | – | 0 |
| Alcorn State | 3 | – | 3 | – | 0 | 5 | – | 6 | – | 0 |
| Mississippi Valley State | 2 | – | 4 | – | 0 | 5 | – | 5 | – | 0 |
| Texas Southern | 1 | – | 5 | – | 0 | 1 | – | 9 | – | 1 |
| Prairie View A&M | 0 | – | 6 | – | 0 | 1 | – | 10 | – | 0 |
$ – Conference champion; ^ – NCAA Division I-AA playoff participant; Rankings from NCAA Division I-AA Football Committee poll

The 1982 Prairie View A&M Panthers football team represented Prairie View A&M University as a member of the Southwestern Athletic Conference (SWAC) during the 1982 NCAA Division I-AA football season. Led by first-year head coach James McKinley, the Panthers compiled an overall record of 1–10, with a conference record of 0–6, and finished seventh in the SWAC.

== Schedule ==
| Date | Opponent | Site | Result | Attendance | Source |
|---|---|---|---|---|---|
| September 2 | at Stephen F. Austin* | Lumberjack Stadium; Nacogdoches, TX | L 0–17 | 10,125 | |
| September 11 | at Southwest Texas State* | Bobcat Stadium; San Marcos, TX | L 7–35 | 11,700 | |
| September 18 | at Jackson State | Mississippi Veterans Memorial Stadium; Jackson, MS | L 6–14 | 15,400 | |
| September 25 | at Southern | A. W. Mumford Stadium; Baton Rouge, LA | L 6–42 | 22,855 | |
| October 2 | vs. No. 2 Grambling State | Cotton Bowl; Dallas, TX (rivalry) | L 6–51 | 32,125 | |
| October 9 | at Bishop* | Cotton Bowl; Dallas, TX | W 24–13 | 2,500 | |
| October 16 | Texas Lutheran* | Edward L. Blackshear Field; Prairie View, TX | L 6–17 | 5,500 | |
| October 30 | at Mississippi Valley State | Magnolia Stadium; Itta Bena, MS | L 13–14 | 7,190 | |
| November 6 | Arkansas–Pine Bluff* | Edward L. Blackshear Field; Prairie View, TX | L 6–31 | 6,800 | |
| November 13 | Alcorn State | Edward L. Blackshear Field; Prairie View, TX | L 6–46 | 4,000 | |
| November 20 | at Texas Southern | Rice Stadium; Houston, TX (rivalry) | L 0–35 | 4,500 | |
*Non-conference game; Rankings from NCAA Division I-AA Football Committee Poll released prior to the game
