= 1982 Texas Southern Tigers football team =

American college football season

1982 Texas Southern Tigers football
- Conference: Southwestern Athletic Conference
- Record: 1–9–1 (1–6 SWAC)
- Head coach: Joe Redmond (2nd season)
- Home stadium: Robertson Stadium; Rice Stadium

1982 Southwestern Athletic Conference football standings
	Conf.					Overall
Team	W		L		T	W		L		T
No. 8 Jackson State $^	6	–	0	–	0	9	–	3	–	0
Southern	5	–	1	–	0	8	–	3	–	0
No. 10 Grambling State	4	–	2	–	0	8	–	3	–	0
Alcorn State	3	–	3	–	0	5	–	6	–	0
Mississippi Valley State	2	–	4	–	0	5	–	5	–	0
Texas Southern	1	–	5	–	0	1	–	9	–	1
Prairie View A&M	0	–	6	–	0	1	–	10	–	0
$ – Conference champion; ^ – NCAA Division I-AA playoff participant; Rankings from NCAA Division I-AA Football Committee poll

The 1982 Texas Southern Tigers football team represented Texas Southern University as a member of the Southwestern Athletic Conference (SWAC) during the 1982 NCAA Division I-AA football season. Led by second-year head coach Joe Redmond, the Tigers compiled an overall record of 1–9–1, with a mark of 1–6 in conference play, and finished seventh in the SWAC.

== Schedule ==
Date	Opponent	Site	Result	Attendance	Source
September 4	Nicholls State*	Robertson Stadium; Houston, TX	L 6–14	5,000	
September 11	at Bethune–Cookman*	Daytona Stadium; Daytona Beach, FL	L 11–28	4,226	
September 18	Southern	Rice Stadium; Houston, TX	L 6–17	35,555	
September 25	Tennessee State*	Robertson Stadium; Houston, TX	T 20–20	8,121	
October 2	at Lamar*	Cardinal Stadium; Beaumont, TX	L 17–28	13,330	
October 9	at Alcorn State	Henderson Stadium; Lorman, MS	L 12–15	4,780	
October 16	at Southeastern Louisiana*	Strawberry Stadium; Hammond, LA	L 0–31	4,000	
October 23	Mississippi Valley State	Rice Stadium; Houston, TX	L 21–28	8,500	
October 30	No. 16 Grambling State	Rice Stadium; Houston, TX	L 30–34	39,000	
November 6	at No. 11 Jackson State	Mississippi Veterans Memorial Stadium; Jackson, MS	L 28–34	15,161	
November 20	Prairie View A&M	Rice Stadium; Houston, TX (rivalry)	W 35–0	4,500	
*Non-conference game; Rankings from NCAA Division I-AA Football Committee Poll released prior to the game
