= 1982 Jackson State Tigers football team =

American college football season

1982 Jackson State Tigers football

SWAC champion

NCAA Division I-AA First Round, L 13–16 at Eastern Illinois
- Conference: Southwestern Athletic Conference
- Record: 9–3 (6–0 SWAC)
- Head coach: W. C. Gorden (7th season)
- Home stadium: Mississippi Veterans Memorial Stadium

1982 Southwestern Athletic Conference football standings
	Conf.					Overall
Team	W		L		T	W		L		T
No. 8 Jackson State $^	6	–	0	–	0	9	–	3	–	0
Southern	5	–	1	–	0	8	–	3	–	0
No. 10 Grambling State	4	–	2	–	0	8	–	3	–	0
Alcorn State	3	–	3	–	0	5	–	6	–	0
Mississippi Valley State	2	–	4	–	0	5	–	5	–	0
Texas Southern	1	–	5	–	0	1	–	9	–	1
Prairie View A&M	0	–	6	–	0	1	–	10	–	0
$ – Conference champion; ^ – NCAA Division I-AA playoff participant; Rankings from NCAA Division I-AA Football Committee poll

The 1982 Jackson State Tigers football team represented the Jackson State University during the 1982 NCAA Division I-AA football season as a member of the Southwestern Athletic Conference (SWAC). Led by seventh-year head coach W. C. Gorden, the Tigers compiled an overall record of 9–3 with an undefeated mark of 6–0 in conference play, winning the SWAC title. They advanced to the NCAA Division I-AA Football Championship playoffs, but suffered a 13–16 overtime loss against Eastern Illinois in the first round.

== Schedule ==
Date	Opponent	Rank	Site	Result	Attendance	Source
September 4	at Alabama State*		Cramton Bowl; Montgomery, AL	W 21–7	6,205	
September 11	at Tennessee State*		Dudley Field; Nashville, TN	L 0–21	22,000	
September 18	Prairie View A&M		Mississippi Veterans Memorial Stadium; Jackson, MS	W 14–6	15,400	
September 25	Mississippi Valley State		Mississippi Veterans Memorial Stadium; Jackson, MS	W 44–17	30,180	
October 2	Nicholls State*		Mississippi Veterans Memorial Stadium; Jackson, MS	L 17–21	13,294	
October 9	No. 14 Florida A&M*		Mississippi Veterans Memorial Stadium; Jackson, MS	W 15–14	24,624	
October 16	at No. 17 Southern		A. W. Mumford Stadium; Baton Rouge, LA (rivalry)	W 17–10	29,235	
October 23	at No. T–5 Grambling State	No. T–15	Grambling Stadium; Grambling, LA	W 22–6	18,180	
October 30	Southeastern Louisiana*	No. 10	Mississippi Veterans Memorial Stadium; Jackson, MS	W 30–13	14,578	
November 6	Texas Southern	No. 11	Mississippi Veterans Memorial Stadium; Jackson, MS	W 34–28	15,161	
November 20	at Alcorn State	No. 8	Henderson Stadium; Lorman, MS (rivalry)	W 20–16	11,478	
November 27	at No. 5 Eastern Illinois*	No. 8	O'Brien Stadium; Charleston, IL (NCAA Division I-AA First Round)	L 13–16 ^{OT}		
*Non-conference game; Rankings from Associated Press Poll released prior to the game

== Roster ==
1982 Jackson State Tigers football team roster
Players
Coaches
Offense

Pos.	#	Name	Class
WR	15	Chris Burkett	So
QB		Derrick McCall	Jr
RB	32	Leonard Moore	Fr
TE	82	Cleo Simmons	Sr
RB	33	Sylvester Stamps	Jr
OL	61	Frank Sutton	So

Defense

Pos.	#	Name	Class
DL	77	Reggie Carr	Fr
DL	84	Thomas Strauthers	Sr
LB	59	Ladell Wills	So
LB	80	Dave Windham	Jr

Special teams

Pos.	#	Name	Class

Head coach

- W. C. Gorden

Coordinators/assistant coaches

Legend

- (C) Team captain
- (S) Suspended
- (I) Ineligible
- Injured
- Redshirt
