= 1982 UMass Minutemen football team =

American college football season

1982 UMass Minutemen football

Yankee Conference co-champion
- Conference: Yankee Conference
- Record: 5–6 (3–2 Yankee)
- Head coach: Bob Pickett (5th season)
- Defensive coordinator: Jim Reid (5th season)
- Home stadium: Alumni Stadium

1982 Yankee Conference football standings
	Conf.					Overall
Team	W		L		T	W		L		T
Maine +	3	–	2	–	0	7	–	4	–	0
Boston University +^	3	–	2	–	0	5	–	6	–	0
Connecticut +	3	–	2	–	0	5	–	6	–	0
UMass +	3	–	2	–	0	5	–	6	–	0
Rhode Island	2	–	3	–	0	7	–	4	–	0
New Hampshire	1	–	4	–	0	4	–	6	–	0
+ – Conference co-champions; ^ – NCAA Division I-AA playoff participant

The 1982 UMass Minutemen football team represented the University of Massachusetts Amherst in the 1982 NCAA Division I-AA football season as a member of the Yankee Conference. The team was coached by Bob Pickett and played its home games at Alumni Stadium in Hadley, Massachusetts. The 1982 season was notable as it was the last Conference Championship for Bob Pickett as coach of the Minutemen. UMass finished the season with a record of 5–6 overall and 3–2 in conference play, winning the Yankee Conference championship.

== Schedule ==
Date	Opponent	Site	Result	Attendance	Source
September 11	West Chester*	Alumni Stadium; Hadley, MA	W 25–3	10,623	
September 18	at Holy Cross*	Fitton Field; Worcester, MA	L 14–27	13,251	
September 25	at Harvard*	Harvard Stadium; Boston, MA	L 14–31	12,500	
October 2	at Rhode Island	Meade Stadium; Kingston, RI	W 17–7	9,443	
October 9	Delaware*	Alumni Stadium; Hadley, MA	L 13–14	10,411	
October 16	at Maine	Alumni Field; Orono, ME	L 24–42	9,800	
October 23	at Boston University	Nickerson Field; Boston, MA	L 6–42	8,249	
October 30	Connecticut	Alumni Stadium; Hadley, MA (rivalry)	W 30–14	9,932	
November 6	Boston College*	Alumni Stadium; Hadley, MA (rivalry)	L 21–34	16,023	
November 13	New Hampshire	Alumni Stadium; Hadley, MA (rivalry)	W 27–0	4,871	
November 20	American International*	Alumni Stadium; Hadley, MA	W 29–13	5,263	
*Non-conference game
