= 1982 New Hampshire Wildcats football team =

American college football season

1982 New Hampshire Wildcats football
- Conference: Yankee Conference
- Record: 4–6 (1–4 Yankee)
- Head coach: Bill Bowes (11th season)
- Home stadium: Cowell Stadium

1982 Yankee Conference football standings
	Conf.					Overall
Team	W		L		T	W		L		T
Maine +	3	–	2	–	0	7	–	4	–	0
Boston University +^	3	–	2	–	0	5	–	6	–	0
Connecticut +	3	–	2	–	0	5	–	6	–	0
UMass +	3	–	2	–	0	5	–	6	–	0
Rhode Island	2	–	3	–	0	7	–	4	–	0
New Hampshire	1	–	4	–	0	4	–	6	–	0
+ – Conference co-champions; ^ – NCAA Division I-AA playoff participant

The 1982 New Hampshire Wildcats football team was an American football team that represented the University of New Hampshire as a member of the Yankee Conference during the 1982 NCAA Division I-AA football season. In its eleventh year under head coach Bill Bowes, the team compiled a 4–6 record (1–4 against conference opponents) and finished last out of six teams in the Yankee Conference.

== Schedule ==
Date	Opponent	Site	Result	Attendance	Source
September 4	at James Madison*	JMU Stadium; Harrisonburg, VA	W 28–6	8,500	
September 11	at Holy Cross*	Fitton Field; Worcester, MA	L 0–28	12,651	
September 18	Boston University	Cowell Stadium; Durham, NH	W 22–20	8,500	
October 2	Connecticut	Cowell Stadium; Durham, NH	L 17–20	8,435	
October 9	Bucknell*	Cowell Stadium; Durham, NH	W 3–0	6,248	
October 16	at Lehigh*	Taylor Stadium; Bethlehem, PA	L 17–20	12,000	
October 23	Northeastern*	Cowell Stadium; Durham, NH	W 24–22	9,255	
October 30	Rhode Island	Cowell Stadium; Durham, NH	L 20–23	6,235	
November 6	Maine	Cowell Stadium; Durham, NH (rivalry)	L 14–31	9,758	
November 13	at UMass	Alumni Stadium; Hadley, MA (rivalry)	L 0–27	4,871	
*Non-conference game

== Roster ==
1982 New Hampshire Wildcats football team roster
Players
Coaches
Offense

Pos.	#	Name	Class
OT		John Flanagan	Jr
C		Tom Flanagan	So
OT		Ken Kaplan	Sr
QB		Rick LeClerc	So
WR		Pete O’Donnell	Jr

Defense

Pos.	#	Name	Class
CB		Bob Price	So

Special teams

Pos.	#	Name	Class

Head coach

- Bill Bowes

Coordinators/assistant coaches

Legend

- (C) Team captain
- (S) Suspended
- (I) Ineligible
- Injured
- Redshirt
