= 1982 Boston University Terriers football team =

American college football season

1982 Boston University Terriers football

Yankee Conference co-champion

NCAA Division I-AA First Round, L 7–21 at Colgate
- Conference: Yankee Conference
- Record: 5–6 (3–2 Yankee)
- Head coach: Rick Taylor (6th season)
- Offensive coordinator: Buddy Teevens (2nd season)
- Defensive coordinator: Ed Sweeney (5th season)
- Home stadium: Nickerson Field

1982 Yankee Conference football standings
| | Conf. | | | | | Overall |
| Team | W | | L | | T | W | | L | | T |
|---|---|---|---|---|---|---|---|---|---|---|
| Maine + | 3 | – | 2 | – | 0 | 7 | – | 4 | – | 0 |
| Boston University +^ | 3 | – | 2 | – | 0 | 5 | – | 6 | – | 0 |
| Connecticut + | 3 | – | 2 | – | 0 | 5 | – | 6 | – | 0 |
| UMass + | 3 | – | 2 | – | 0 | 5 | – | 6 | – | 0 |
| Rhode Island | 2 | – | 3 | – | 0 | 7 | – | 4 | – | 0 |
| New Hampshire | 1 | – | 4 | – | 0 | 4 | – | 6 | – | 0 |
+ – Conference co-champions; ^ – NCAA Division I-AA playoff participant

The 1982 Boston University Terriers football team was an American football team that represented Boston University as a member of the Yankee Conference during the 1982 NCAA Division I-AA football season. In their sixth season under head coach Rick Taylor, the Terriers compiled a 5–6 record (3–2 against conference opponents), finished in a four-way tie for the Yankee Conference championship, lost to Colgate in the first round of the NCAA Division I-AA Football Championship playoffs, and outscored opponents by a total of 250 to 223.

== Schedule ==
| Date | Opponent | Site | Result | Attendance | Source |
|---|---|---|---|---|---|
| September 18 | at New Hampshire | Cowell Stadium; Durham, NH | L 20–22 | 8,500 | |
| September 25 | Maine | Nickerson Field; Boston, MA | W 48–45 ^{4OT} | 6,043 | |
| October 2 | at Cornell | Schoellkopf Field; Ithaca, NY | W 17–6 | 10,000 | |
| October 9 | at Yale | Yale Bowl; New Haven, CT | L 24–27 | 15,500 | |
| October 16 | at Rhode Island | Meade Stadium; Kingston, RI | W 26–16 | 10,230 | |
| October 23 | UMass | Nickerson Field; Boston, MA | W 42–6 | 8,249 | |
| October 30 | No. 6 Holy Cross | Nickerson Field; Boston, MA | L 21–34 | 9,130 | |
| November 6 | at Connecticut | Memorial Stadium; Storrs, CT | L 10–13 | 8,299 | |
| November 13 | at Bucknell* | Memorial Stadium; Lewisburg, PA | W 14–11 | 4,500 | |
| November 20 | No. 16 Colgate | Nickerson Field; Boston, MA | L 21–22 | 1,887 | |
| November 26 | at No. 9 Colgate | Andy Kerr Stadium; Hamilton, NY (NCAA Division I-AA First Round) | L 7–21 | 2,500 | |
*Non-conference game; Rankings from NCAA Division I-AA Football Committee Poll released prior to the game
