= Tuck Woolum =

American football player and coach

Playing career
- 1979–1982: Eastern Kentucky
- Position: Quarterback

Coaching career (HC unless noted)
- 1983–1984: Eastern Kentucky (SA)
- 1986–1990: Eastern Kentucky (assistant)
- 1991–1993: Western Carolina (assistant)
- 1994–1998: Union (KY)

Head coaching record
- Overall: 20–29–1

Tuck Woolum is an American former football player and coach. He served as the head football coach at Union College—now known as Union Commonwealth University—in Barbourville, Kentucky from 1994 to 1998, compiling a record of 20–29–1.

Woolum played college football as a quarterback for the Eastern Kentucky Colonels. He was the starting quarterback when the team won the 1982 NCAA Division I-AA Football Championship Game.

== Head coaching record ==
Year	Team	Overall	Conference	Standing	Bowl/playoffs
Union (Kentucky) Bulldogs (Mid-South Conference) (1994–1998)
1994	Union	7–3	3–2	T–2nd	
1995	Union	7–2–1	6–1–1	2nd	
1996	Union	4–6	3–4	T–4th	
1997	Union	2–8	2–4	T–5th	
1998	Union	0–10	0–7	8th	
Union:		20–29–1	14–18–1		
Total:		20–29–1			
