= Steve Bird =

American football player and coach (born 1960)

Personal information
- Born: October 20, 1960 (age 66); Indianapolis, Indiana, U.S.
- Listed height: 5 ft 11 in (1.80 m)
- Listed weight: 171 lb (78 kg)

Career information
- High school: Corbin (Corbin, Kentucky)
- College: Eastern Kentucky
- NFL draft: 1983: 5th round, 130th overall pick

Career history

Playing
- St. Louis Cardinals (1983–1984); San Diego Chargers (1984); Cincinnati Bengals (1985)*; Edmonton Eskimos (1985); Montreal Alouettes (1986); Detroit Lions (1987)*; Philadelphia Eagles (1987)*
- * Offseason or practice squad member only

Coaching
- Eastern Kentucky (1987–1989) Wide receivers coach; Kentucky (1990–1991) Graduate assistant; Tennessee (1992) Graduate assistant; Pittsburgh (1993–1995) Wide receivers coach & kickers coach; Kent State (1996) Tight ends coach; Tulane (1997–1998) Wide receivers coach; Middle Tennessee (1999–2000) Wide receivers coach; West Virginia (2001–2004) Passing game coordinator & wide receivers coach; Eastern Kentucky (2005) Tight ends coach; Eastern Kentucky (2006) Wide receivers coach; Bowling Green (2007–2008) Special teams coordinator & outside receivers coach; South Florida (2009–2011) Offensive assistant; South Carolina State (2013–2017) Special teams coordinator & wide receivers coach; South Carolina State (2018–2020) Special teams coordinator & running backs coach; South Carolina State (2021–2022) Special teams coordinator & wide receivers coach; South Carolina State (2023) Special teams coordinator & running backs coach

Awards and highlights
- 2× NCAA Division I-AA national champion (1979, 1982)

Career NFL statistics
- Punt returns: 20
- Yards: 136
- Average: 6.8
- Stats at Pro Football Reference

Steven L. Bird (born October 20, 1960) is an American football special teams coordinator for South Carolina State. He played college football for Eastern Kentucky where he was named to the First-Team All-OVC and won two Division I-AA national championship games in 1979 and 1982. He was drafted in the fifth round of the 1983 NFL draft by the St. Louis Cardinals of the National Football League (NFL). He also played for the San Diego Chargers, Philadelphia Eagles, and Cincinnati Bengals and the Edmonton Eskimos and Montreal Alouettes of the Canadian Football League (CFL).

After the end of Bird's playing career he joined his alma mater as a wide receivers coach. He coached for Kentucky, Tennessee, Pittsburgh, Kent State, Tulane, Middle Tennessee, and West Virginia before returning to Eastern Kentucky for a third time as an offensive assistant. After a stint with Bowling Green and South Florida he joined South Carolina State for the longest tenure of his career since 2013 as the team's special teams coordinator.

== College career ==
Bird was a three-year starter at wide receiver for Eastern Kentucky and played in four consecutive Division I-AA national championship games (1979–82); the Colonels won in 1979 and 1982. Bird was a first-team All-OVC choice in 1982 when he was also selected to the I-AA All-American team by Kodak, The Sporting News and the Associated Press. He was also chosen as the OVC's Male Athlete of the Year for 1982–83. In 1982, he led the OVC with 63 receptions for 1,056 yards and 10 touchdowns. He was inducted into the Eastern Kentucky Hall of Fame in 2010.

== Professional career ==
=== St. Louis Cardinals ===
Bird was drafted 130th overall in the fifth round in the 1983 NFL draft to the St. Louis Cardinals of the National Football League (NFL). He was also drafted in the eleventh round by the Washington Federals of the United States Football League (USFL) in the 1983 USFL draft, but he opted to play for the Cardinals. He made his professional debut in the first week of the season against the New Orleans Saints but did not record any stats. He made his first kick and punt returns against the San Francisco 49ers in week three as the team lost 27–42. Four days after his 23rd birthday in a 20–20 tie with the New York Giants he tallied the highest amount of returns in his career as he had four kick returns for 88 yards and five punt returns for 32 yards.

In week one of 1984 Bird started the season off breaking the 100-yard return yards barrier as he had 103 kick return yards in five attempts.

On October 24, 1984, he was released by the Cardinals.

=== San Diego Chargers ===
On November 3, 1984, following Bird's release from the Cardinals he signed with the San Diego Chargers. He made his debut for the Chargers in week ten against the Indianapolis Colts as he returned two kicks for fifteen yards and one punt for four yards in his final game in the NFL.

=== Cincinnati Bengals ===
In 1985, Bird signed with the Cincinnati Bengals. On August 20, 1985, he was released.

=== Edmonton Eskimos ===
In 1985, Bird signed with the Edmonton Eskimos of the Canadian Football League (CFL). He played in two games for the Eskimos, recording three catches for 33 yards and he also continued his role as a punt and kick returner.

=== Montreal Alouettes ===
In 1986, Bird signed with the Montreal Alouettes. He appeared in five games for the Alouettes where he recorded a career-high seventeen receptions for 228 yards while also not returning kicks and punts.

=== Philadelphia Eagles ===
On August 12, 1987, Bird returned to the NFL and signed with the Philadelphia Eagles. He was released prior to the season and did not play for them.

== Coaching career ==
=== Early life ===
Following Bird's playing days he joined his college team, Eastern Kentucky, as a wide receivers coach.

From 1990 and 1992 he was a graduate assistant for Kentucky and Tennessee, working mostly with the offense and the receivers.

In 1993, he joined Pittsburgh as their wide receivers coach, before joining Kent State in 1996 as a tight ends coach. He would have stints with Tulane and Middle Tennessee as wide receivers coaches, West Virginia as the passing game coordinator and wide receivers coach, and Eastern Kentucky as a tight ends then receivers coach.

In 2007, he joined Bowling Green as a special teams coordinator and wide receivers coach before becoming an offensive assistant for South Florida in 2009.

=== South Carolina State ===
In 2013, Bird was hired by South Carolina State to be their special teams coordinator and wide receivers coach.

In 2018, Bird moved from coaching the wide receivers to coaching the running backs while also maintaining his special teams duty.

In 2021, Bird returned to coaching the wide receivers and special teams.

== Personal ==
His father, Jerry Bird, played basketball at Kentucky.
