= 1982 Grambling State Tigers football team =

American college football season

1982 Grambling State Tigers football
- Conference: Southwestern Athletic Conference
- Record: 8–3 (4–2 SWAC)
- Head coach: Eddie Robinson (40th season)
- Home stadium: Grambling Stadium

1982 Southwestern Athletic Conference football standings
	Conf.					Overall
Team	W		L		T	W		L		T
No. 8 Jackson State $^	6	–	0	–	0	9	–	3	–	0
Southern	5	–	1	–	0	8	–	3	–	0
No. 10 Grambling State	4	–	2	–	0	8	–	3	–	0
Alcorn State	3	–	3	–	0	5	–	6	–	0
Mississippi Valley State	2	–	4	–	0	5	–	5	–	0
Texas Southern	1	–	5	–	0	1	–	9	–	1
Prairie View A&M	0	–	6	–	0	1	–	10	–	0
$ – Conference champion; ^ – NCAA Division I-AA playoff participant; Rankings from NCAA Division I-AA Football Committee poll

The 1982 Grambling State Tigers football team represented Grambling State University as a member of the Southwestern Athletic Conference (SWAC) during the 1982 NCAA Division I-AA football season. Led by 40th-year head coach Eddie Robinson, the Tigers compiled an overall record of 8–3 and a mark of 4–2 in conference play and finished third in the SWAC. Coach Robinson won his 300th all time game with the Tigers 43–21 win over Florida A&M on September 25.

== Schedule ==
Date	Opponent	Rank	Site	Result	Attendance	Source
September 4	vs. Morgan State*		Yankee Stadium; Bronx, NY	W 42–13	33,142	
September 18	vs. Alcorn State		Independence Stadium; Shreveport, LA (Red River Classic)	W 31–14	40,333	
September 25	at Florida A&M*	No. 4	Bragg Memorial Stadium; Tallahassee, FL	W 43–21	22,127	
October 2	vs. Prairie View A&M	No. 2	Cotton Bowl; Dallas, TX (rivalry)	W 51–6	32,125	
October 9	No. 18 Tennessee State*	No. 2	Grambling Stadium; Grambling, LA	L 8–22	18,522	
October 16	vs. Mississippi Valley State	No. 7	Independence Stadium; Shreveport, LA (Jubilee Classic)	W 21–14	19,230	
October 23	No. T–15 Jackson State	No. T–5	Grambling Stadium; Grambling, LA	L 6–22	18,180	
October 30	at Texas Southern	No. 16	Rice Stadium; Houston, TX	W 34–30	39,000	
November 6	Alabama State	No. 15	Grambling Stadium; Grambling, LA	W 36–14	20,655	
November 13	at Nicholls State*		John L. Guidry Stadium; Thibodaux, LA	W 33–15	12,200	
November 27	vs. Southern	No. 10	Louisiana Superdome; New Orleans, LA (Bayou Classic)	L 17–22	70,000	
*Non-conference game; Rankings from NCAA Division I-AA Football Committee Poll released prior to the game
