= 1982 Bethune–Cookman Wildcats football team =

American college football season

1982 Bethune–Cookman Wildcats football
- Conference: Mid-Eastern Athletic Conference
- Record: 5–5 (3–2 MEAC)
- Head coach: Bobby Frazier (4th season)
- Home stadium: Memorial Stadium

1982 Mid-Eastern Athletic Conference football standings
	Conf.					Overall
Team	W		L		T	W		L		T
No. 7 South Carolina State $^	4	–	1	–	0	9	–	3	–	0
Florida A&M	4	–	1	–	0	6	–	5	–	0
Bethune–Cookman	3	–	2	–	0	5	–	5	–	0
Howard	2	–	3	–	0	6	–	5	–	0
Delaware State	2	–	3	–	0	4	–	7	–	0
North Carolina A&T	0	–	5	–	0	2	–	8	–	0
$ – Conference champion; ^ – NCAA Division I-AA playoff participant; Rankings from NCAA Division I-AA Football Committee poll

The 1982 Bethune–Cookman Wildcats football team represented Bethune–Cookman College (now known as Bethune–Cookman University) as a member of the Mid-Eastern Athletic Conference (MEAC) during the 1982 NCAA Division I-AA football season. Led by fourth-year head coach Bobby Frazier, the Wildcats compiled an overall record of 5–5, with a mark of 3–2 in conference play, and finished third in the MEAC.

== Schedule ==
Date	Opponent	Site	Result	Attendance	Source
September 4	vs. Southern*	Gator Bowl Stadium; Jacksonville, FL	L 10–14	15,530	
September 11	Texas Southern*	Memorial Stadium; Daytona Beach, FL	W 28–11	4,226	
September 18	at Howard	Howard Stadium; Washington, DC	W 19–9	7,600	
September 25	at North Carolina A&T	Aggie Stadium; Greensboro, NC	W 38–23	4,000	
October 2	Delaware State	Memorial Stadium; Daytona Beach, FL	W 27–24	3,642	
October 9	at UCF*	Orlando Stadium; Orlando, FL	W 40–21	9,127	
October 16	Morris Brown*	Memorial Stadium; Daytona Beach, FL	L 24–32		
October 23	at No. T–5 Tennessee State*	Hale Stadium; Nashville, TN	L 11–41	10,000	
November 6	vs. No. 8 South Carolina State	Orlando Stadium; Orlando, FL	L 6–27	30,023	
November 20	vs. Florida A&M	Tampa Stadium; Tampa, FL (rivalry)	L 14–29	39,613	
*Non-conference game; Rankings from NCAA Division I-AA Football Committee Poll released prior to the game
