= 1982 South Carolina State Bulldogs football team =

American college football season

1982 South Carolina State Bulldogs football

Black college national champion MEAC champion

NCAA Division I-AA Quarterfinal, L 3–38 vs. Louisiana Tech
- Conference: Mid-Eastern Athletic Conference
- Record: 9–3 (4–1 MEAC)
- Head coach: Bill Davis (4th season)
- Defensive coordinator: Oliver Pough (2nd season)
- Home stadium: State College Stadium

1982 Mid-Eastern Athletic Conference football standings
	Conf.					Overall
Team	W		L		T	W		L		T
No. 7 South Carolina State $^	4	–	1	–	0	9	–	3	–	0
Florida A&M	4	–	1	–	0	6	–	5	–	0
Bethune–Cookman	3	–	2	–	0	5	–	5	–	0
Howard	2	–	3	–	0	6	–	5	–	0
Delaware State	2	–	3	–	0	4	–	7	–	0
North Carolina A&T	0	–	5	–	0	2	–	8	–	0
$ – Conference champion; ^ – NCAA Division I-AA playoff participant; Rankings from NCAA Division I-AA Football Committee poll

The 1982 South Carolina State Bulldogs football team represented South Carolina State College (now known as South Carolina State University) as a member of the Mid-Eastern Athletic Conference (MEAC) during the 1982 NCAA Division I-AA football season. Led by fourth-year head coach Bill Davis, the Bulldogs compiled an overall record of 9–3 and a mark of 4–1 in conference play, and finished as MEAC champion. At the conclusion of the season, the Bulldogs were also recognized as black college national champion.

== Schedule ==
Date	Opponent	Rank	Site	Result	Attendance	Source
September 4	Eastern Kentucky*		State College Stadium; Orangeburg, SC	L 19–20	11,008	
September 11	at Delaware State		Alumni Stadium; Dover, DE	L 7–17	5,000	
September 18	at North Carolina A&T		Aggie Stadium; Greensboro, NC	W 27–6	11,500	
September 25	Howard		State College Stadium; Orangeburg, SC	W 50–0	9,841	
October 2	Alcorn State*		State College Stadium; Orangeburg, SC	W 20–0	8,320	
October 9	Johnson C. Smith*		State College Stadium; Orangeburg, SC	W 21–6	14,000	
October 16	Davidson*		State College Stadium; Orangeburg, SC	W 24–7	6,027	
October 23	Florida A&M	No. 14	State College Stadium; Orangeburg, SC	W 21–19	11,654	
October 30	at Morris Brown*	No. 9	Herndon Stadium; Atlanta, GA	W 45–19	6,000	
November 6	vs. Bethune–Cookman*	No. 8	Orlando Stadium; Orlando, FL	W 27–6	30,023	
November 27	at No. 6 Furman*	No. 7	Paladin Stadium; Greenville, SC (NCAA Division I-AA First Round)	W 17–0	13,865	
December 4	at No. 2 Louisiana Tech*	No. 7	Joe Aillet Stadium; Ruston, LA (NCAA Division I-AA Quarterfinal)	L 3–38	13,000	
*Non-conference game; Rankings from NCAA Division I-AA Football Committee Poll released prior to the game
