= 1982 Florida A&M Rattlers football team =

American college football season

1982 Florida A&M Rattlers football
- Conference: Mid-Eastern Athletic Conference
- Record: 6–5 (4–1 MEAC)
- Head coach: Rudy Hubbard (9th season)
- Home stadium: Bragg Memorial Stadium

1982 Mid-Eastern Athletic Conference football standings
	Conf.					Overall
Team	W		L		T	W		L		T
No. 7 South Carolina State $^	4	–	1	–	0	9	–	3	–	0
Florida A&M	4	–	1	–	0	6	–	5	–	0
Bethune–Cookman	3	–	2	–	0	5	–	5	–	0
Howard	2	–	3	–	0	6	–	5	–	0
Delaware State	2	–	3	–	0	4	–	7	–	0
North Carolina A&T	0	–	5	–	0	2	–	8	–	0
$ – Conference champion; ^ – NCAA Division I-AA playoff participant; Rankings from NCAA Division I-AA Football Committee poll

The 1982 Florida A&M Rattlers football team represented Florida A&M University as a member of the Mid-Eastern Athletic Conference (MEAC) during the 1982 NCAA Division I-AA football season. Led by ninth-year head coach Rudy Hubbard, the Rattlers compiled an overall record of 6–5, with a mark of 4–1 in conference play, and finished second in the MEAC.

== Schedule ==
Date	Opponent	Rank	Site	Result	Attendance	Source
September 11	Morris Brown*		Bragg Memorial Stadium; Tallahassee, FL	W 27–0	16,300	
September 19	at Delaware State		Alumni Stadium; Dover, DE	W 39–23	5,000	
September 25	No. 4 Grambling State*		Bragg Memorial Stadium; Tallahassee, FL	L 21–43	22,127	
October 2	vs. Howard		Gator Bowl Stadium; Jacksonville, FL	W 62–3	22,120	
October 9	at Jackson State*	No. 14	Mississippi Veterans Memorial Stadium; Jackson, MS	L 14–15	24,624	
October 16	Albany State*		Bragg Memorial Stadium; Tallahassee, FL	W 48–0	8,200	
October 23	at No. 14 South Carolina State		State College Stadium; Orangeburg, SC	L 19–21	11,654	
October 30	at Alcorn State*		Bragg Memorial Stadium; Tallahassee, FL	L 13–23	25,583	
November 6	vs. North Carolina A&T		Miami Orange Bowl; Miami, FL (Orange Blossom Classic)	W 35–7	17,019	
November 13	at Southern*		A. W. Mumford Stadium; Baton Rouge, LA	L 21–24	22,355	
November 20	vs. Bethune–Cookman		Tampa Stadium; Tampa, FL (rivalry)	W 29–14	39,613	
*Non-conference game; Rankings from NCAA Division I-AA Football Committee Poll released prior to the game
