= 1982 Rhode Island Rams football team =

American college football season

1982 Rhode Island Rams football
- Conference: Yankee Conference
- Record: 7–4 (2–3 Yankee)
- Head coach: Bob Griffin (7th season)
- Offensive coordinator: Niles Nelson (2nd season)
- Defensive coordinator: Pete Adrian (7th season)
- Home stadium: Meade Stadium

1982 Yankee Conference football standings
| | Conf. | | | | | Overall |
| Team | W | | L | | T | W | | L | | T |
|---|---|---|---|---|---|---|---|---|---|---|
| Maine + | 3 | – | 2 | – | 0 | 7 | – | 4 | – | 0 |
| Boston University +^ | 3 | – | 2 | – | 0 | 5 | – | 6 | – | 0 |
| Connecticut + | 3 | – | 2 | – | 0 | 5 | – | 6 | – | 0 |
| UMass + | 3 | – | 2 | – | 0 | 5 | – | 6 | – | 0 |
| Rhode Island | 2 | – | 3 | – | 0 | 7 | – | 4 | – | 0 |
| New Hampshire | 1 | – | 4 | – | 0 | 4 | – | 6 | – | 0 |
+ – Conference co-champions; ^ – NCAA Division I-AA playoff participant

The 1982 Rhode Island Rams football team was an American football team that represented the University of Rhode Island in the Yankee Conference during the 1982 NCAA Division I-AA football season. In their seventh season under head coach Bob Griffin, the Rams compiled a 7–4 record (2–3 against conference opponents) and finished fifth out of six teams in the conference.

On September 19, 1980, Rhode Island defeated Maine in a game that took six overtimes to complete and was one of the longest games in college football history.

== Schedule ==
| Date | Opponent | Site | Result | Attendance | Source |
|---|---|---|---|---|---|
| September 11 | at Lafayette* | Fisher Field; easton, PA | W 20–10 | 9,500 | |
| September 18 | at Maine | Alumni Field; Orono, ME | W 58–55 ^{6OT} | 6,250 | |
| September 25 | at Brown* | Brown Stadium; Providence, RI | L 20–24 | 14,008 | |
| October 2 | UMass^{†} | Meade Stadium; Kingston, RI | L 7–17 | 9,433 | |
| October 9 | at Northeastern* | Parsons Field; Brookline, MA | W 14–13 | 1,200 | |
| October 16 | Boston University^{†} | Meade Stadium; Kingston, RI | L 16–26 | 10,230 | |
| October 23 | Southern Connecticut* | Meade Stadium; Kingston, RI | W 41–14 | 4,611 | |
| October 30 | at New Hampshire | Cowell Stadium; Durham, NH | W 23–20 | 6,235 | |
| November 6 | Lehigh* | Meade Stadium; Kingston, RI | W 20–16 | 7,526 | |
| November 13 | at Connecticut | Memorial Stadium; Storrs, CT | L 21–26 | 3,063 | |
| November 20 | Springfield* | Meade Stadium; Kingston, RI | W 24–0 | 5,232 | |
*Non-conference game; ^{†}Homecoming
