= 1982 Southern Jaguars football team =

American college football season

1982 Southern Jaguars football
- Conference: Southwestern Athletic Conference
- Record: 8–3 (5–1 SWAC)
- Head coach: Otis Washington (2nd season)
- Home stadium: A. W. Mumford Stadium

1982 Southwestern Athletic Conference football standings
	Conf.					Overall
Team	W		L		T	W		L		T
No. 8 Jackson State $^	6	–	0	–	0	9	–	3	–	0
Southern	5	–	1	–	0	8	–	3	–	0
No. 10 Grambling State	4	–	2	–	0	8	–	3	–	0
Alcorn State	3	–	3	–	0	5	–	6	–	0
Mississippi Valley State	2	–	4	–	0	5	–	5	–	0
Texas Southern	1	–	5	–	0	1	–	9	–	1
Prairie View A&M	0	–	6	–	0	1	–	10	–	0
$ – Conference champion; ^ – NCAA Division I-AA playoff participant; Rankings from NCAA Division I-AA Football Committee poll

The 1982 Southern Jaguars football team represented Southern University as a member of the Southwestern Athletic Conference (SWAC) during the 1982 NCAA Division I-AA football season. Led by second-year head coach Otis Washington, the Jaguars compiled an overall record of 8–3, with a conference record of 5–1, and finished second in the SWAC.

== Schedule ==
Date	Opponent	Rank	Site	Result	Attendance	Source
September 4	vs. Bethune–Cookman*		Gator Bowl Stadium; Jacksonville, FL	W 14–10	15,530	
September 18	at Texas Southern		Rice Stadium; Houston, TX	W 17–6	35,555	
September 25	Prairie View A&M		A. W. Mumford Stadium; Baton Rouge, LA	W 42–6	22,855	
October 2	Mississippi Valley State		A. W. Mumford Stadium; Baton Rouge, LA	W 31–14	23,985	
October 9	at Nicholls State*	No. 8	A. W. Mumford Stadium; Baton Rouge, LA	L 14–28	23,660	
October 16	Jackson State	No. 17	A. W. Mumford Stadium; Baton Rouge, LA (rivalry)	L 10–17	29,235	
October 23	at Alcorn State		Henderson Stadium; Lorman, MS	W 17–12	11,355	
October 30	at No. 3 Tennessee State*		Dudley Field; Nashville, TN	L 21–28	37,000	
November 6	at Southeastern Louisiana*		Strawberry Stadium; Hammond, LA	W 26–19	10,000	
November 13	Florida A&M*		A. W. Mumford Stadium; Baton Rouge, LA	W 24–21	22,355	
November 27	vs. No. 10 Grambling State		Louisiana Superdome; New Orleans, LA (Bayou Classic)	W 22–17	70,000	
*Non-conference game; Rankings from NCAA Division I-AA Football Committee Poll released prior to the game
