= 1982 NCAA Division I-AA football season =

American college football season

1982 NCAA Division I-AA season

Regular season
- Number of teams: 92
- Duration: August–November

Playoff
- Duration: November 27–December 18
- Championship date: December 18, 1982
- Championship site: Memorial Stadium; Wichita Falls, Texas
- Champion: Eastern Kentucky

NCAA Division I-AA football seasons
- «1981 1983»

The 1982 NCAA Division I-AA football season, part of college football in the United States organized by the National Collegiate Athletic Association at the Division I-AA level, began in August 1982 and concluded with the 1982 NCAA Division I-AA Football Championship Game in the Pioneer Bowl on December 18, at Memorial Stadium in Wichita Falls, Texas. The Eastern Kentucky Colonels won their second I-AA championship, defeating the Delaware Fightin' Blue Hens, 17−14.

== Conference changes and new programs ==
Upon the expiration of the four-year limit for compliance with Division I-A football criteria (set in January 1978), 41 NCAA Division I-A teams were reclassified from Division I-A to Division I-AA:

- Ivy League — all eight members. Yale met the requirements to stay in I-A, but voluntarily chose to downgrade to I-AA to remain with the rest of the Ivy League.
- Southern Conference — all eight members
- Southland Conference — five members. McNeese State and Southwestern Louisiana met the requirements to remain in I-A; McNeese State voluntarily chose to downgrade to I-AA to remain with the rest of the Southland, while Southwestern Louisiana remained in Division I-A as an Independent.
- Missouri Valley Conference — five members, with New Mexico State, Tulsa, and Wichita State remaining in I-A but also remaining in the conference. This was the onset of a four-year period in which the MVC functioned as a hybrid I-A/I-AA conference.
- Mid-American Conference — eight members, with only Central Michigan and Toledo maintaining I-A status. Several of the demoted schools appealed the demotion, with the result that all eight MAC members involuntarily reclassified to I-AA for 1982 were returned to I-A as of 1983.
- Independent Cincinnati was reclassified to I-AA along with the MAC schools but filed an injunction against the NCAA to postpone their demotion until after the 1982 season, and was successful in remaining in I-A.

The successful appeals of Cincinnati (effective 1982) and the MAC schools (effective 1983) meant that 40 Division I-A members joined I-AA in 1982, of which 32 remained in 1983.

School	1981 Conference	1982 Conference
Alabama State	D-II Independent	Independent (I-AA)
Appalachian State	Southern (I-A)	Southern (I-AA)
Arkansas State	Southland (I-A)	Southland (I-AA)
Ball State	MAC (I-A)	MAC (I-AA)
Bowling Green	MAC (I-A)	MAC (I-AA)
Brown	Ivy (I-A)	Ivy (I-AA)
Chattanooga	Southern (I-A)	Southern (I-AA)
Colgate	I-A Independent	I-AA Independent
Columbia	Ivy (I-A)	Ivy (I-AA)
Cornell	Ivy (I-A)	Ivy (I-AA)
Dartmouth	Ivy (I-A)	Ivy (I-AA)
Drake	Missouri Valley (I-A)	Missouri Valley (I-AA)
East Tennessee State	Southern (I-A)	Southern (I-AA)
Eastern Michigan	MAC (I-A)	MAC (I-AA)
Furman	Southern (I-A)	Southern (I-AA)
Harvard	Ivy (I-A)	Ivy (I-AA)
Holy Cross	I-A Independent	I-AA Independent
Illinois State	Missouri Valley (I-A)	Missouri Valley (I-AA)
Indiana State	Missouri Valley (I-A)	Missouri Valley (I-AA)
Kent State	MAC (I-A)	MAC (I-AA)
Lamar	Southland (I-A)	Southland (I-AA)
Northeast Louisiana	I-A Independent	Southland (I-AA)
Louisiana Tech	Southland (I-A)	Southland (I-AA)
Marshall	Southern (I-A)	Southern (I-AA)
McNeese State	Southland (I-A)	Southland (I-AA)
Miami (OH)	MAC (I-A)	MAC (I-AA)
North Texas State	I-A Independent	I-AA Independent
Northern Illinois	MAC (I-A)	MAC (I-AA)
Ohio	MAC (I-A)	MAC (I-AA)
Penn	Ivy (I-A)	Ivy (I-AA)
Princeton	Ivy (I-A)	Ivy (I-AA)
Richmond	I-A Independent	I-AA Independent
Southern Illinois	Missouri Valley (I-A)	Missouri Valley (I-AA)
Texas–Arlington	Southland (I-A)	Southland (I-AA)
The Citadel	Southern (I-A)	Southern (I-AA)
VMI	Southern (I-A)	Southern (I-AA)
West Texas State	Missouri Valley (I-A)	Missouri Valley (I-AA)
Western Carolina	Southern (I-A)	Southern (I-AA)
Western Kentucky	Ohio Valley	I-AA Independent
Western Michigan	MAC (I-A)	MAC (I-AA)
William & Mary	I-A Independent	I-AA Independent
Yale	Ivy (I-A)	Ivy (I-AA)

== Conference standings ==
1982 Association of Mid-Continent Universities football standings
	Conf.					Overall
Team	W		L		T	W		L		T
No. 5 Eastern Illinois +^	2	–	0	–	1	11	–	1	–	1
Northern Iowa +	2	–	0	–	1	4	–	6	–	1
Southwest Missouri State	1	–	2	–	0	5	–	6	–	0
Western Illinois	0	–	3	–	0	2	–	8	–	0
+ – Conference co-champions; ^ – NCAA Division I-AA playoff participant; Rankings from NCAA Division I-AA Football Committee poll

1982 Big Sky Conference football standings
	Conf.					Overall
Team	W		L		T	W		L		T
No. 19 Montana $^	5	–	2	–	0	6	–	6	–	0
No. 11 Idaho ^	5	–	2	–	0	9	–	4	–	0
Montana State	5	–	2	–	0	6	–	5	–	0
No. 15 Boise State	4	–	3	–	0	8	–	3	–	0
Nevada	3	–	4	–	0	6	–	5	–	0
Northern Arizona	3	–	4	–	0	4	–	7	–	0
Weber State	2	–	5	–	0	4	–	7	–	0
Idaho State	1	–	6	–	0	3	–	8	–	0
$ – Conference champion; ^ – NCAA Division I-AA playoff participant; Rankings from NCAA Division I-AA Poll

1982 Ivy League football standings
	Conf.					Overall
Team	W		L		T	W		L		T
Harvard +	5	–	2	–	0	7	–	3	–	0
Penn +	5	–	2	–	0	7	–	3	–	0
Dartmouth +	5	–	2	–	0	5	–	5	–	0
Princeton	3	–	4	–	0	3	–	7	–	0
Yale	3	–	4	–	0	4	–	6	–	0
Brown	3	–	4	–	0	5	–	5	–	0
Cornell	3	–	4	–	0	4	–	6	–	0
Columbia	1	–	6	–	0	1	–	9	–	0
+ – Conference co-champions

1982 Mid-American Conference football standings
	Conf.					Overall
Team	W		L		T	W		L		T
Bowling Green $	7	–	2	–	0	7	–	5	–	0
Western Michigan	5	–	2	–	2	7	–	2	–	2
Miami (OH)	5	–	3	–	0	7	–	4	–	0
Central Michigan	5	–	3	–	1	6	–	4	–	1
Ohio	5	–	4	–	0	6	–	5	–	0
Toledo	5	–	4	–	0	6	–	5	–	0
Northern Illinois	5	–	4	–	0	5	–	5	–	0
Ball State	4	–	4	–	0	5	–	6	–	0
Eastern Michigan	1	–	7	–	1	1	–	9	–	1
Kent State	0	–	9	–	0	0	–	11	–	0
$ – Conference champion; The conference was a hybrid of NCAA Division I-A and I-AA programs. Central Michigan and Toledo were I-A while the other teams were classified as I-AA for the 1982 season only.

1982 Mid-Eastern Athletic Conference football standings
	Conf.					Overall
Team	W		L		T	W		L		T
No. 7 South Carolina State $^	4	–	1	–	0	9	–	3	–	0
Florida A&M	4	–	1	–	0	6	–	5	–	0
Bethune–Cookman	3	–	2	–	0	5	–	5	–	0
Howard	2	–	3	–	0	6	–	5	–	0
Delaware State	2	–	3	–	0	4	–	7	–	0
North Carolina A&T	0	–	5	–	0	2	–	8	–	0
$ – Conference champion; ^ – NCAA Division I-AA playoff participant; Rankings from NCAA Division I-AA Football Committee poll

1982 Missouri Valley Conference football standings
	Conf.					Overall
Team	W		L		T	W		L		T
Tulsa $	6	–	0	–	0	10	–	1	–	0
Wichita State	4	–	1	–	0	8	–	3	–	0
Southern Illinois	4	–	1	–	0	6	–	5	–	0
Indiana State	3	–	2	–	0	5	–	6	–	0
Drake	2	–	4	–	0	4	–	7	–	0
New Mexico State	1	–	4	–	0	3	–	8	–	0
West Texas State	1	–	4	–	0	3	–	8	–	0
Illinois State	0	–	5	–	0	2	–	9	–	0
$ – Conference champion; The conference was a hybrid of NCAA Division I-A and I-AA programs. New Mexico State, Tulsa, and Wichita State were I-A and the other teams were I-AA.

1982 Ohio Valley Conference football standings
	Conf.					Overall
Team	W		L		T	W		L		T
No. 1 Eastern Kentucky $^	7	–	0	–	0	13	–	0	–	0
Akron	5	–	2	–	0	6	–	5	–	0
Middle Tennessee	4	–	3	–	0	8	–	3	–	0
Youngstown State	4	–	3	–	0	6	–	5	–	0
Morehead State	2	–	5	–	0	5	–	6	–	0
Murray State	2	–	5	–	0	4	–	7	–	0
Austin Peay	2	–	5	–	0	3	–	7	–	0
Tennessee Tech	1	–	6	–	0	3	–	8	–	0
$ – Conference champion; ^ – NCAA Division I-AA playoff participant; Rankings from NCAA Division I-AA Football Committee poll

1982 Southern Conference football standings
	Conf.					Overall
Team	W		L		T	W		L		T
No. 6 Furman $^	6	–	1	–	0	9	–	3	–	0
No. 17 Chattanooga	5	–	1	–	0	7	–	4	–	0
Western Carolina	4	–	2	–	0	6	–	5	–	0
The Citadel	3	–	4	–	0	5	–	6	–	0
Appalachian State	3	–	4	–	0	4	–	7	–	0
VMI	2	–	3	–	0	5	–	6	–	0
East Tennessee State	2	–	5	–	0	2	–	9	–	0
Marshall	1	–	6	–	0	3	–	7	–	0
Davidson	0	–	0	–	0	3	–	7	–	0
$ – Conference champion; ^ – NCAA Division I-AA playoff participant; Rankings from NCAA Division I-AA Football Committee poll

1982 Southland Conference football standings
	Conf.					Overall
Team	W		L		T	W		L		T
No. 2 Louisiana Tech $^	5	–	0	–	0	10	–	3	–	0
No. 12 Northeast Louisiana	4	–	1	–	0	8	–	3	–	0
Arkansas State	2	–	3	–	0	5	–	6	–	0
McNeese State	2	–	3	–	0	4	–	6	–	1
Lamar	1	–	4	–	0	4	–	7	–	0
UT Arlington	1	–	4	–	0	3	–	8	–	0
$ – Conference champion; ^ – NCAA Division I-AA playoff participant; Rankings from NCAA Division I-AA Football Committee poll

1982 Southwestern Athletic Conference football standings
	Conf.					Overall
Team	W		L		T	W		L		T
No. 8 Jackson State $^	6	–	0	–	0	9	–	3	–	0
Southern	5	–	1	–	0	8	–	3	–	0
No. 10 Grambling State	4	–	2	–	0	8	–	3	–	0
Alcorn State	3	–	3	–	0	5	–	6	–	0
Mississippi Valley State	2	–	4	–	0	5	–	5	–	0
Texas Southern	1	–	5	–	0	1	–	9	–	1
Prairie View A&M	0	–	6	–	0	1	–	10	–	0
$ – Conference champion; ^ – NCAA Division I-AA playoff participant; Rankings from NCAA Division I-AA Football Committee poll

1982 Yankee Conference football standings
	Conf.					Overall
Team	W		L		T	W		L		T
Maine +	3	–	2	–	0	7	–	4	–	0
Boston University +^	3	–	2	–	0	5	–	6	–	0
Connecticut +	3	–	2	–	0	5	–	6	–	0
UMass +	3	–	2	–	0	5	–	6	–	0
Rhode Island	2	–	3	–	0	7	–	4	–	0
New Hampshire	1	–	4	–	0	4	–	6	–	0
+ – Conference co-champions; ^ – NCAA Division I-AA playoff participant

1982 NCAA Division I-AA independents football standings
	Conf.			Overall
Team	W	L	T	W		L		T
No. 3 Delaware ^		–		12	–	2	–	0
No. 4 Tennessee State ^		–		10	–	1	–	1
No. 13 Holy Cross		–		8	–	3	–	0
James Madison		–		8	–	3	–	0
No. 9 Colgate ^		–		8	–	4	–	0
No. 20 Lafayette		–		7	–	3	–	0
Nicholls State		–		7	–	4	–	0
No. 18 Northwestern State		–		6	–	5	–	0
Western Kentucky		–		5	–	5	–	0
Bucknell		–		4	–	6	–	0
Lehigh		–		4	–	6	–	0
Southeastern Louisiana		–		4	–	7	–	0
Northeastern		–		3	–	6	–	0
Alabama State		–		2	–	6	–	1
William & Mary		–		3	–	8	–	0
North Texas State		–		2	–	9	–	0
Richmond		–		0	–	10	–	0
^ – NCAA Division I-AA playoff participant; Rankings from NCAA Division I-AA Football Committee

== Conference champions ==
Conference champions

Big Sky Conference – Montana (tiebreaker over Idaho, Montana State)
Ivy League – Dartmouth, Harvard, and Penn
Mid-Continent Conference – Eastern Illinois
Mid-Eastern Athletic Conference – South Carolina State
Ohio Valley Conference – Eastern Kentucky
Southern Conference– Furman
Southland Conference – Louisiana Tech
Southwestern Athletic Conference – Jackson State
Yankee Conference – Boston University, Connecticut, Maine, and Massachusetts

== Postseason ==
The playoffs expanded from eight to twelve teams this season; four years later, in 1986, the field was expanded to sixteen teams.

=== NCAA Division I-AA playoff bracket ===
The top four teams were seeded, and received first-round byes.

First Round; November 27; Campus sites
Idaho*	21
Montana	7
Eastern Illinois*	16
Jackson State	13
Furman*	0
South Carolina State	17
Colgate*	21
Boston University	7

Quarterfinals; December 4 Campus sites
(1) Eastern Kentucky*	38
Idaho	30
(4) Tennessee State*	20
Eastern Illinois	19
(2) Louisiana Tech*	38
South Carolina State	3
(3) Delaware*	20
Colgate	13

Semifinals; December 11; Campus sites
(1) Eastern Kentucky*	13
(4) Tennessee State	7
(2) Louisiana Tech*	0
(3) Delaware	17

National Championship Game; December 18; Memorial Stadium; Wichita Falls, Texas
(1) Eastern Kentucky	17
(3) Delaware	14

* Next to team name denotes host institution
