= 1982 Alabama State Hornets football team =

American college football season

1982 Alabama State Hornets football
- Conference: Southwestern Athletic Conference
- Record: 2–6–1 (0–0 SWAC)
- Head coach: George James Jr. (7th season)
- Home stadium: Cramton Bowl

1982 Southwestern Athletic Conference football standings
	Conf.					Overall
Team	W		L		T	W		L		T
No. 8 Jackson State $^	6	–	0	–	0	9	–	3	–	0
Southern	5	–	1	–	0	8	–	3	–	0
No. 10 Grambling State	4	–	2	–	0	8	–	3	–	0
Alcorn State	3	–	3	–	0	5	–	6	–	0
Mississippi Valley State	2	–	4	–	0	5	–	5	–	0
Texas Southern	1	–	5	–	0	1	–	9	–	1
Prairie View A&M	0	–	6	–	0	1	–	10	–	0
$ – Conference champion; ^ – NCAA Division I-AA playoff participant; Rankings from NCAA Division I-AA Football Committee poll

The 1982 Alabama State Hornets football team represented Alabama State University as a member of the Southwestern Athletic Conference (SWAC) during the 1982 NCAA Division I-AA football season. Led by seventh-year head coach George James Jr., the Hornets compiled an overall record of 2–6–1. The 1982 season marked the first for Alabama State as a member of Division I after their reclassification petition was approved in June 1982.

== Schedule ==
Date	Opponent	Site	Result	Attendance	Source
September 4	Jackson State*	Cramton Bowl; Montgomery, AL	L 7–21	11,497	
September 11	vs. Alcorn State*	Ladd Stadium; Mobile, AL (Gulf Coast Classic)	L 6–21	13,510	
September 18	Albany State*	Cramton Bowl; Montgomery, AL	W 14–7	4,127	
October 2	Tennessee State*	Cramton Bowl; Montgomery, AL	L 0–42	11,200	
October 9	at Mississippi Valley State*	Magnolia Stadium; Itta Bena, MS	L 6–23	5,100	
October 23	Lane*	Cramton Bowl; Montgomery, AL	W 61–7	1,592	
October 30	vs. Alabama A&M*	Legion Field; Birmingham, AL (Magic City Classic)	T 13–13	35,603	
November 6	at No. 15 Grambling State*	Grambling Stadium; Grambling, LA	L 14–36	20,655	
November 25	Tuskegee*	Cramton Bowl; Montgomery, AL (Turkey Day Classic)	L 13–14	19,000	
*Non-conference game; Rankings from Associated Press Poll released prior to the game
