= 1982 North Texas State Mean Green football team =

American college football season

1982 North Texas State Mean Green football
- Conference: Southland Conference
- Record: 2–9 (0–0 Southland)
- Head coach: Corky Nelson (1st season)
- Home stadium: Fouts Field

1982 Southland Conference football standings
	Conf.					Overall
Team	W		L		T	W		L		T
No. 2 Louisiana Tech $^	5	–	0	–	0	10	–	3	–	0
No. 12 Northeast Louisiana	4	–	1	–	0	8	–	3	–	0
Arkansas State	2	–	3	–	0	5	–	6	–	0
McNeese State	2	–	3	–	0	4	–	6	–	1
Lamar	1	–	4	–	0	4	–	7	–	0
UT Arlington	1	–	4	–	0	3	–	8	–	0
$ – Conference champion; ^ – NCAA Division I-AA playoff participant; Rankings from NCAA Division I-AA Football Committee poll

The 1982 North Texas State Mean Green football team was an American football team that represented North Texas State University (now known as the University of North Texas) during the 1982 NCAA Division I-AA football season as a member of the Southland Conference. In their first year under head coach Corky Nelson, the team compiled a 2–9 record. Although a member of the Southland, North Texas was ineligible to compete for the conference championship in 1982.

== Schedule ==
Date	Time	Opponent	Site	Result	Attendance	Source
September 4	7:00 p.m.	at Baylor*	Baylor Stadium; Waco, TX	L 17–21	24,000	
September 11	1:30 p.m.	at Oklahoma State*	Lewis Field; Stillwater, OK	L 6–27	45,500	
September 18	1:38 p.m.	Northeast Louisiana	Fouts Field; Denton, TX	L 15–38	9,450	
September 25	1:30 p.m.	Southwestern Louisiana*	Fouts Field; Denton, TX	L 14–31	6,000	
October 2	6:58 p.m.	at No. 7 SMU*	Texas Stadium; Irving, TX (rivalry)	L 10–38	30,118	
October 9	7:30 p.m.	at UT Arlington	Maverick Stadium; Arlington, TX	W 17–3	9,487	
October 23	1:30 p.m.	at West Texas State*	Kimbrough Memorial Stadium; Canyon, TX	L 22–24	10,019	
October 30	1:38 p.m.	New Mexico*^{†}	Fouts Field; Denton, TX	L 17–20		
November 6	2:30 p.m.	at New Mexico State*	Aggie Memorial Stadium; Las Cruces, NM	L 19–30	13,796	
November 13	12:33 p.m.	at Richmond*	City Stadium; Richmond, VA	W 22–13	8,869	
November 20	1:32 p.m.	No. 20 Tulsa*	Fouts Field; Denton, TX	L 20–38	8,500	
*Non-conference game; ^{†}Homecoming; Rankings from AP Poll released prior to the game; All times are in Central time
