= 1982 NCAA Division I-AA football rankings =

The 1982 NCAA Division I-AA football rankings are from the NCAA Division I-AA football committee. This is for the 1982 season.

== Legend ==
	Increase in ranking
	Decrease in ranking
	Not ranked previous week
(#–#)	Win–loss record
(Italics)	Number of first place votes
т	Tied with team above or below also with this symbol

== NCAA Division I-AA Football Committee poll ==
	Week 1 Sept 22	Week 2 Sept 29	Week 3 Oct 6	Week 4 Oct 13	Week 5 Oct 20	Week 6 Oct 27	Week 7 Nov 3	Week 8 Nov 10 (Note: A search of newspapers for the week of November 10 has found numerous instances of a "Top 10" ranking, but no "Top 20" list has been found.)	Week 9 Nov 17	Week 10 Nov 24	
1.	Idaho State (2–0)	Eastern Kentucky (3–0)	Eastern Kentucky (4–0)	Eastern Kentucky (5–0)	Eastern Kentucky (5–0)	Eastern Kentucky (6–0)	Eastern Kentucky (7–0)	Eastern Kentucky (8–0)	Eastern Kentucky (9–0)	Eastern Kentucky (10–0)	1.
2.	Eastern Kentucky (2–0) т	Grambling State (3–0)	Grambling State (4–0)	Miami (OH) (5–0)	Colgate (5–0)	Louisiana Tech (6–1)	Louisiana Tech (7–1)	Louisiana Tech (8–1)	Delaware (8–1)	Louisiana Tech (9–2)	2.
3.	Miami (OH) (2–0) т	Miami (OH) (3–0)	Miami (OH) (4–0)	Colgate (5–0)	Delaware (5–1)	Tennessee State (6–0–1)	Delaware (7–1)	Tennessee State (7–0–1)	Tennessee State (8–0–1)	Delaware (9–1)	3.
4.	Grambling State (2–0)	Bowling Green (2–0) т	Holy Cross (4–0)	Delaware (4–1)	Louisiana Tech (5–1)	Delaware (6–1)	Tennessee State (7–0–1)	Delaware (7–1)	Eastern Illinois (10–0–1)	Tennessee State (9–0–1)	4.
5.	Bowling Green (2–0)	Holy Cross (3–0) т	Bowling Green (3–0)	Louisiana Tech (4–1)	Tennessee State (5–0–1) т	Northeast Louisiana (6–2)	Northeast Louisiana (7–2)	Eastern Illinois (9–0–1)	South Carolina State (8–2)	Eastern Illinois (10–0–1)	5.
6.	Holy Cross (2–0)	Boise State (3–0)	Colgate (4–0)	Tennessee State (4–0–1)	Grambling State (5–1) т	Holy Cross (6–1)	Eastern Illinois (8–0–1)	South Carolina State (8–2)	Furman (8–2)	Furman (9–2)	6.
7.	Boise State (2–0)	Colgate (3–0)	Northeast Louisiana (4–1)	Grambling State (4–1)	Western Michigan (4–1–1)	Eastern Illinois (7–0–1)	Holy Cross (7–1)	Furman (7–2)	Louisiana Tech (8–2)	South Carolina State (8–2)	7.
8.	Southeastern Louisiana (2–0)	Southern (3–0)	Southern (4–0)	Boise State (4–1)	Miami (OH) (5–1)	Colgate (5–1)	South Carolina State (7–2)	Jackson State (8–2)	Jackson State (8–2)	Jackson State (9–2)	8.
9.	Colgate (2–0)	Western Michigan (3–0)	James Madison (4–1)	Holy Cross (4–1)	Holy Cross (5–1)	South Carolina State (6–2)	Furman (6–2)	Miami (OH) (7–2)	Idaho (8–2)	Colgate (7–3)	9.
10.	Florida A&M (2–0)	Northeast Louisiana (3–1)	Louisiana Tech (3–1)	James Madison (4–1) т	Bowling Green (4–1)	Jackson State (6–2)	Nicholls State (6–2)	Idaho (7–2)	Bowling Green (7–2)	Grambling State (8–2)	10.
11.			Delaware (3–1)	Bowling Green (3–1) т	Northeast Louisiana (5–2)	Furman (5–2)	Jackson State (7–2)		Grambling State (8–2)	Idaho (8–3)	11.
12.			Boise State (3–1)	Penn (4–0) т	Eastern Illinois (6–0–1)	Chattanooga (5–2)	Colgate (5–2)		Western Michigan (7–2–1)	Northeast Louisiana (8–3)	12.
13.			Western Michigan (3–1)	Arkansas State (3–2)	Montana State (5–2)	Ohio (5–2)	Miami (OH) (6–2)		Chattanooga (7–3)	Holy Cross (8–3)	13.
14.			Florida A&M (3–1)	Idaho (4–1)	South Carolina State (5–1)	Penn (5–1)	Idaho (6–2)		Holy Cross (8–2)	Bowling Green (7–3)	14.
15.			Idaho (3–1)	Chattanooga (4–1)	Furman (4–2) т	Nicholls State (5–2)	Grambling State (6–2)		Northeast Louisiana (7–3)	Boise State (8–3)	15.
16.			Penn (3–0)	Northeast Louisiana (4–2)	Jackson State (5–2) т	Grambling State (5–2)	Western Michigan (5–2–1)		Colgate (6–3)	Western Michigan (7–2–2)	16.
17.			Arkansas State (2–2)	Southern (4–1)	Penn (4–1)	Miami (OH) (5–2) т	James Madison (6–2)		Penn (7–2)	Chattanooga (7–4)	17.
18.			Tennessee State (3–0–1)	Western Michigan (3–1–1) т	Montana (4–2)	Idaho (5–2) т	Bowling Green (5–2)		Northwestern State (7–3) (Note: In the actual printed polls, Northwestern State was listed as Northwestern Louisiana)	Northwestern State (7–4)	18.
19.			Chattanooga (3–1)	Bethune–Cookman (5–1) т	Chattanooga (4–2)	Western Michigan (4–2–1)	Chattanooga (5–3)		Boise State (7–3)	Montana (6–5)	19.
20.			Bethune–Cookman (4–1)	Eastern Illinois (5–0–1)	James Madison (4–2)	James Madison (5–2)	Boston University (4–3)		Miami (OH) (7–3)	Lafayette (7–3)	20.
	Week 1 Sept 22	Week 2 Sept 29	Week 3 Oct 6	Week 4 Oct 13	Week 5 Oct 20	Week 6 Oct 27	Week 7 Nov 3	Week 8 Nov 10 (Note: A search of newspapers for the week of November 10 has found numerous instances of a "Top 10" ranking, but no "Top 20" list has been found.)	Week 9 Nov 17	Week 10 Nov 24	
		Dropped: 1 Idaho State; 8 Southeastern Louisiana; 10 Florida A&M	None	Dropped: 14 Florida A&M	Dropped: 8 Boise State; 13 Arkansas State; 14 Idaho; 17 Southern; 19 Bethune–Cookman	Dropped: 10 Bowling Green; 13 Montana State; 18 Montana	Dropped: 13 Ohio; 14 Penn	Dropped: 5 Northeast Louisiana; 7 Holy Cross; 10 Nicholls State; 12 Colgate; 15 Grambling State; 16 Western Michigan; 17 James Madison; 18 Bowling Green; 19 Chattanooga; 20 Boston University	None	Dropped: 17 Penn; 20 Miami (OH)	
