= List of Richmond Spiders football seasons =

The following is a list of Richmond Spiders football seasons.

== Seasons ==
Year	Coach	Overall	Conference	Standing	Bowl/playoffs	Coaches^{#}	AP^{°}
Richmond Spiders (Southern Conference) (1936–1975)
1951	Ed Merrick	3–8	2–6	T–12th			
1952	Ed Merrick	1–9	0–6	17th			
1953	Ed Merrick	5–3–1	3–3	T–5th			
1954	Ed Merrick	5–4	2–3	6th			
1955	Ed Merrick	4–3–2	3–2–2	5th			
1956	Ed Merrick	4–5	2–5	7th			
1957	Ed Merrick	4–6	2–4	T–5th			
1959	Ed Merrick	4–5–1	4–3–1	5th			
1960	Ed Merrick	3–6–1	3–4–1	6th			
1961	Ed Merrick	5–5	5–2	2nd			
1962	Ed Merrick	6–3	3–2	3rd			
1963	Ed Merrick	3–6–1	2–2–1	T–5th			
1964	Ed Merrick	3–7	2–4	6th			
1965	Ed Merrick	0–10	0–6	9th			
1966	Frank Jones	2–8	2–4	7th			
1967	Frank Jones	5–5	5–2	3rd			
1968	Frank Jones	8–3	6–0	1st	W Tangerine		
1969	Frank Jones	6–4	5–1	T–1st			
1970	Frank Jones	4–6	3–3	T–4th			
1971	Frank Jones	5–6	5–1	1st	L Tangerine		
1972	Frank Jones	6–4	5–1	2nd			
1973	Frank Jones	8–2	5–1	2nd			
1974	Jim Tait	5–5	3–3	T–3rd			
1975	Jim Tait	5–6	5–1	1st			
Richmond Spiders (NCAA Division I/I-A independent) (1976–1981)
1976	Jim Tait	5–6					
1977	Jim Tait	3–8					
1978	Jim Tait	3–8					
1979	Jim Tait	0–11					
1980	Dal Shealy	5–6					
1981	Dal Shealy	4–7					
Richmond Spiders (NCAA Division I-AA independent) (1982–1985)
1982	Dal Shealy	0–10					
1983	Dal Shealy	3–8					
1984	Dal Shealy	8–4			L NCAA Division I-AA Quarterfinal		12
1985	Dal Shealy	8–3					18
Richmond Spiders (Yankee Conference) (1986–1996)
1986	Dal Shealy	4–7	3–4	T–5th			
1987	Dal Shealy	7–5	6–1	T–1st	L NCAA Division I-AA First Round		17
1988	Dal Shealy	4–7	2–6	9th			
1989	Jim Marshall	1–10	0–8	9th			
1990	Jim Marshall	1–10	1–7	9th			
1991	Jim Marshall	2–9	2–6	T–7th			
1992	Jim Marshall	7–4	5–3	T–3rd			
1993	Jim Marshall	5–6	3–5	4th (Mid-Atlantic)			
1994	Jim Marshall	3–8	1–7	6th (Mid-Atlantic)			
1995	Jim Reid	7–3–1	5–3	T–3rd (Mid-Atlantic)			20
1996	Jim Reid	2–9	1–7	6th (Mid-Atlantic)			
Richmond Spiders (Atlantic 10 Conference) (1997–2006)
1997	Jim Reid	6–5	4–4	T–4th (Mid-Atlantic)			
1998	Jim Reid	9–3	7–1	1st (Mid-Atlantic)	L NCAA Division I-AA First Round		10
1999	Jim Reid	5–6	3–5	T–6th			
2000	Jim Reid	10–3	7–1	T–1st	L NCAA Division I-AA Quarterfinal		6
2001	Jim Reid	3–8	3–6	T–8th			
2002	Jim Reid	4–7	4–5	T–6th			
2003	Jim Reid	2–9	1–8	11th			
2004	Dave Clawson	3–8	1–7	5th (South)			
2005	Dave Clawson	9–4	7–1	1st (South)	L NCAA Division I-AA Quarterfinal		8
2006	Dave Clawson	6–5	3–5	T–4th (South)			
Richmond Spiders (Colonial Athletic Association) (2007–present)
2007	Dave Clawson	11–3	7–1	1st (South)	L NCAA Division I Semifinal	4	5
2008	Mike London	13–3	6–2	3rd (South)	W NCAA Division I Championship	1	1
2009	Mike London	11–2	7–1	1st (South)	L NCAA Division I Quarterfinal	5	5
2010	Latrell Scott	6–5	4–4	T–4th			
2011	Wayne Lineburg	3–8	0–8	11th			
2012	Danny Rocco	8–3	6–2	T–1st		18	18
2013	Danny Rocco	6–6	4–4	T–5th			
2014	Danny Rocco	9–5	5–3	4th	L NCAA Division I Second Round	16	16
2015	Danny Rocco	10–4	6–2	T–1st	L NCAA Division I Semifinal	3	4
2016	Danny Rocco	10–4	5–3	T–4th	L NCAA Division I Quarterfinal	8	8
2017	Russ Huesman	6–5	4–4	6th			
2018	Russ Huesman	4–7	2–6	T–10th			
2019	Russ Huesman	5–7	4–4	T–5th			
2020	Russ Huesman	3–1	3–1	2nd (South)		14	15
2021	Russ Huesman	6–5	4–2	T–4th			
2022	Russ Huesman	9–4	6–2	T–3rd	L NCAA Division I Second Round	12	11
2023	Russ Huesman	9–4	7–1	T–1st	L NCAA Division I Second Round	25	15
2024	Russ Huesman	10–3	8–0	1st	L NCAA Division I First Round	16	15
2025	Russ Huesman	7–5	3–4	T–3rd			
Total:							
National championship Conference title Conference division title or championship game berth
^{†}Indicates Bowl Coalition, Bowl Alliance, BCS, or CFP / New Years' Six bowl.; ^{#}Rankings from final Coaches Poll.
