= 1971 Richmond Spiders football team =

American college football season

1971 Richmond Spiders football

SoCon champion

Tangerine Bowl, L 3–28 vs. Toledo
- Conference: Southern Conference
- Record: 5–6 (5–1 SoCon)
- Head coach: Frank Jones (6th season)
- Home stadium: City Stadium

1971 Southern Conference football standings
| | Conf. | | | | | Overall |
| Team | W | | L | | T | W | | L | | T |
|---|---|---|---|---|---|---|---|---|---|---|
| Richmond $ | 5 | – | 1 | – | 0 | 5 | – | 6 | – | 0 |
| William & Mary | 4 | – | 1 | – | 0 | 5 | – | 6 | – | 0 |
| The Citadel | 4 | – | 2 | – | 0 | 8 | – | 3 | – | 0 |
| East Carolina | 3 | – | 2 | – | 0 | 4 | – | 6 | – | 1 |
| Furman | 2 | – | 3 | – | 0 | 5 | – | 5 | – | 1 |
| VMI | 1 | – | 4 | – | 0 | 1 | – | 10 | – | 0 |
| Davidson | 0 | – | 6 | – | 0 | 1 | – | 9 | – | 0 |
$ – Conference champion

The 1971 Richmond Spiders football team was an American football team that represented the University of Richmond as a member of the Southern Conference (SoCon) during the 1971 NCAA University Division football season. In their sixth season under head coach Frank Jones, Richmond compiled an 5–6 record, with a mark of 5–1 in conference play, finishing as SoCon co-champion. In the postseason, the Spiders lost to Toledo in the Tangerine Bowl.

== Schedule ==
| Date | Opponent | Site | Result | Attendance | Source |
|---|---|---|---|---|---|
| September 11 | North Carolina* | City Stadium; Richmond, VA | L 0–28 | 16,000 | |
| September 25 | West Virginia* | City Stadium; Richmond, VA | L 3–16 | 11,000 | |
| October 2 | Boston College* | City Stadium; Richmond, VA | L 0–24 | 6,500 | |
| October 9 | at East Carolina | Ficklen Memorial Stadium; Greenville, NC | W 14–7 | 14,235 | |
| October 16 | VMI | City Stadium; Richmond, VA (rivalry) | W 21–6 | 10,000 | |
| October 23 | Furman | City Stadium; Richmond, VA | W 20–0 | 5,500 | |
| October 30 | at Southern Miss* | Faulkner Field; Hattiesburg, MS | L 24–31 | 10,000 | |
| November 6 | The Citadel | City Stadium; Richmond, VA | L 11–21 | 8,000 | |
| November 13 | at Davidson | Richardson Stadium; Davidson, NC | W 14–7 | 2,800 | |
| November 20 | at William & Mary | Cary Field; Williamsburg, VA (rivalry) | W 21–19 | 13,000 | |
| December 28 | vs. No. 14 Toledo | Tangerine Bowl; Orlando, FL (Tangerine Bowl) | L 3–28 | 16,750 | |
*Non-conference game; Rankings from AP Poll released prior to the game
