= Bill Hess =

American football coach

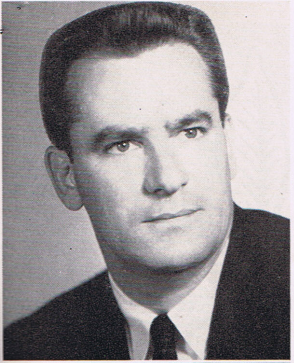
- Hess, c. 1958

Biographical details
- Born: February 5, 1923
- Died: June 10, 1978 (aged 55); Athens, Ohio, U.S.

Coaching career (HC unless noted)
- 1951–1957: Ohio State (assistant)
- 1958–1977: Ohio

Head coaching record
- Overall: 108–91–4
- Bowls: 0–2

Accomplishments and honors

Championships
- 1 NCAA College Division National (1960); 4 MAC (1960, 1963, 1967–1968)

Awards
- MAC Coach of the Year (1968)

William R. Hess (February 5, 1923 – June 10, 1978) was an American college football coach. He served as the head football coach at Ohio University from 1958 to 1977. In his tenure as head coach for the Ohio Bobcats football team, Hess compiled a 108–91–4 record. He ranked second on Ohio's all-time victories list behind Hall of Famer Don Peden at the time of his retirement, though he has since been passed by Frank Solich. Hess's teams won four Mid-American Conference (MAC) championships (1960, 1963, 1967, and 1968) and won a National Small College Championship in 1960 after having an undefeated season. Hess also led the Bobcats to two bowl games, losing 15–14 to West Texas State in the 1962 Sun Bowl and losing 49–42 to Richmond in the 1968 Tangerine Bowl. His 1968 team is the only team in school history to finish ranked in the major polls. Hess was a native of Columbus, Ohio. He coached high school football in Portsmouth and Grandview Heights, Ohio before joining Woody Hayes's staff at Ohio State University in 1951.

== Head coaching record ==
Year	Team	Overall	Conference	Standing	Bowl/playoffs	Coaches^{#}	AP^{°}
Ohio Bobcats (Mid-American Conference) (1958–1977)
1958	Ohio	5–4	2–4	T–4th			
1959	Ohio	7–2	4–2	2nd			
1960	Ohio	10–0	6–0	1st			
1961	Ohio	5–3–1	3–2–1	4th			
1962	Ohio	8–3	5–1	2nd	L Sun		
1963	Ohio	6–4	5–1	1st			
1964	Ohio	5–4–1	3–2–1	4th			
1965	Ohio	0–10	0–6	7th			
1966	Ohio	5–5	3–3	4th			
1967	Ohio	6–4	5–1	T–1st			
1968	Ohio	10–1	6–0	1st	L Tangerine	18	20
1969	Ohio	5–4–1	2–3	T–3rd			
1970	Ohio	4–5	3–2	T–2nd			
1971	Ohio	5–5	2–3	T–3rd			
1972	Ohio	3–8	1–4	6th			
1973	Ohio	5–5	2–3	T–3rd			
1974	Ohio	6–5	3–2	T–2nd			
1975	Ohio	5–5–1	2–4	T–5th			
1976	Ohio	7–4	6–2	T–2nd			
1977	Ohio	1–10	0–8	10th			
Ohio:		108–91–4	63–53–2				
Total:		108–91–4					
National championship Conference title Conference division title or championship game berth
^{#}Rankings from final Coaches Poll.; ^{°}Rankings from final AP Poll.
