= Seth Williams (defensive back) =

American gridiron football player (born 1986)

No. 29
- Position: Defensive back

Personal information
- Born: October 24, 1986 (age 40); Fayetteville, North Carolina, U.S.
- Listed height: 5 ft 11 in (1.80 m)
- Listed weight: 185 lb (84 kg)

Career information
- High school: Cape Fear (NC)
- College: Richmond
- NFL draft: 2010: undrafted

Career history
- New York Giants (2010)*; Montreal Alouettes (2011–2013); Ottawa Redblacks (2014); New Orleans VooDoo (2015); Tampa Bay Storm (2016)
- * Offseason or practice squad member only

Awards and highlights
- NCAA FCS national champion (2008)

Career CFL statistics
- Tackles: 118
- Interceptions: 2
- Stats at CFL.ca (archived)

Career AFL statistics
- Tackles: 17
- Interceptions: 0
- Sacks: 0.5
- Pass breakups: 1
- Forced fumbles: 1
- Stats at ArenaFan.com

Seth Williams (born October 24, 1986) is an American former professional football defensive back. Williams played college football at the University of Richmond. The Richmond Spiders won the NCAA Division I FCS championship in 2008. He was a member of the New York Giants, Ottawa Redblacks, Montreal Alouettes, New Orleans VooDoo and Tampa Bay Storm.

== Professional career ==
Pre-draft measurables
Height	Weight	40-yard dash	10-yard split	20-yard split	20-yard shuttle	Three-cone drill	Vertical jump	Broad jump	Bench press
5 ft 9 3/8 in (1.76 m)	185 lb (84 kg)	4.50 s	1.57 s	2.64 s	4.03 s	6.89 s	34.5 in (0.88 m)	10 ft 3 in (3.12 m)	15 reps
All values from Pro Day

=== New York Giants ===
Williams was signed by the New York Giants on April 26, 2010. He was waived by the Giants on September 4, 2010 and signed to their practice squad on September 5. Williams was released by the New York Giants on September 9, 2010.

=== Montreal Alouettes ===
Williams signed with the Montreal Alouettes on January 20, 2011. He recorded 98 tackles from 2011 to 2012. He was signed to a two-year deal by the Alouettes on February 14, 2013. He was the Alouettes Most Outstanding Rookie in 2011.

He was released by the Alouettes on June 21, 2013.

Williams missed the entire 2013 season while recovering form an ankle injury.

=== Ottawa Redblacks ===
Williams was signed by the Ottawa Redblacks on March 4, 2014. He was released by the Redblacks on August 18, 2014.

=== New Orleans VooDoo ===
William was assigned to the New Orleans VooDoo of the Arena Football League (AFL) on March 6, 2015. He became a free agent after the 2015 season.

=== Tampa Bay Storm ===
On March 1, 2016, Williams was assigned to the Tampa Bay Storm. On April 7, 2016, Williams was placed on reassignment. On May 4, 2016, Williams was assigned to the Storm again.
