= 2008 NCAA Division I Football Championship Game =

Postseason college football game

2008 NCAA Division I Football Championship
- FCS National Championship Game
Montana Grizzlies	Richmond Spiders
(14–1)	(12–3)
Big Sky	CAA
7	24
Head coach: Bobby Hauck	Head coach: Mike London
TSN / Seed; 5 / 4	TSN / Seed; 7 / —
	1	2	3	4	Total
Montana	0	0	0	7	7
Richmond	7	14	0	3	24
- Date: December 19, 2008
- Season: 2008
- Stadium: Finley Stadium
- Location: Chattanooga, Tennessee
- Favorite: Richmond by 1.5
- Referee: Cooper Castleberry (Southland)
- Attendance: 17,823

United States TV coverage
- Network: ESPN2

The 2008 NCAA Division I Football Championship Game was a postseason college football game between the Richmond Spiders and the Montana Grizzlies. It was played on December 19, 2008, at Finley Stadium, home field of the University of Tennessee at Chattanooga. The culminating game of the 2008 NCAA Division I FCS football season, it was won by Richmond, 24–7.

== Teams ==
The participants of the Championship Game were the finalists of the 2008 FCS Playoffs, which began with a 16-team bracket.

=== Richmond Spiders ===
Richmond finished their regular season with a 9–3 record (6–2 in conference), after starting their season 4–3 through their first seven games. The Spiders defeated Eastern Kentucky, second-seeded Appalachian State, and third-seeded Northern Iowa to reach the final. This was Richmond's first appearance in an FCS/Division I-AA championship game.

=== Montana Grizzlies ===
Montana finished their regular season with an 11–1 record (7–1 in conference). As the fourth-seed in the tournament, the Grizzlies defeated Texas State, Weber State (who had given Montana their only defeat during the regular season), and top-seeded James Madison to reach the final. This was Montana's sixth appearance in an FCS/Division I-AA championship game, having previously won in 1995 and 2001, and having lost in 1996, 2000, and 2004.

== Game summary ==
=== Scoring summary ===
Scoring summary

Quarter	Time	Drive			Team	Scoring information	Score	
Quarter	Time	Plays	Yards	TOP	Team	Scoring information	MONT	RICH
1	9:02	11	66	5:58	RICH	Eric Ward 23-yard touchdown reception from John Crone, Andrew Howard kick good	0	7
2	11:29	3	34	1:14	RICH	Josh Vaughan 5-yard touchdown run, Howard kick good	0	14
2	2:13	12	75	6:52	RICH	Garrett Wilkins 13-yard touchdown reception from Ward, Howard kick good	0	21
4	11:56	13	69	4:28	MONT	Chase Reynolds 4-yard touchdown run, Brody McKnight kick good	7	21
4	6:54	4	-1	1:32	RICH	39-yard field goal by Brian Radford	7	24
"TOP" = time of possession. For other American football terms, see Glossary of American football.							7	24

=== Game statistics ===
	1	2	3	4	Total
No. 4 Grizzlies	0	0	0	7	7
Spiders	7	14	0	3	24

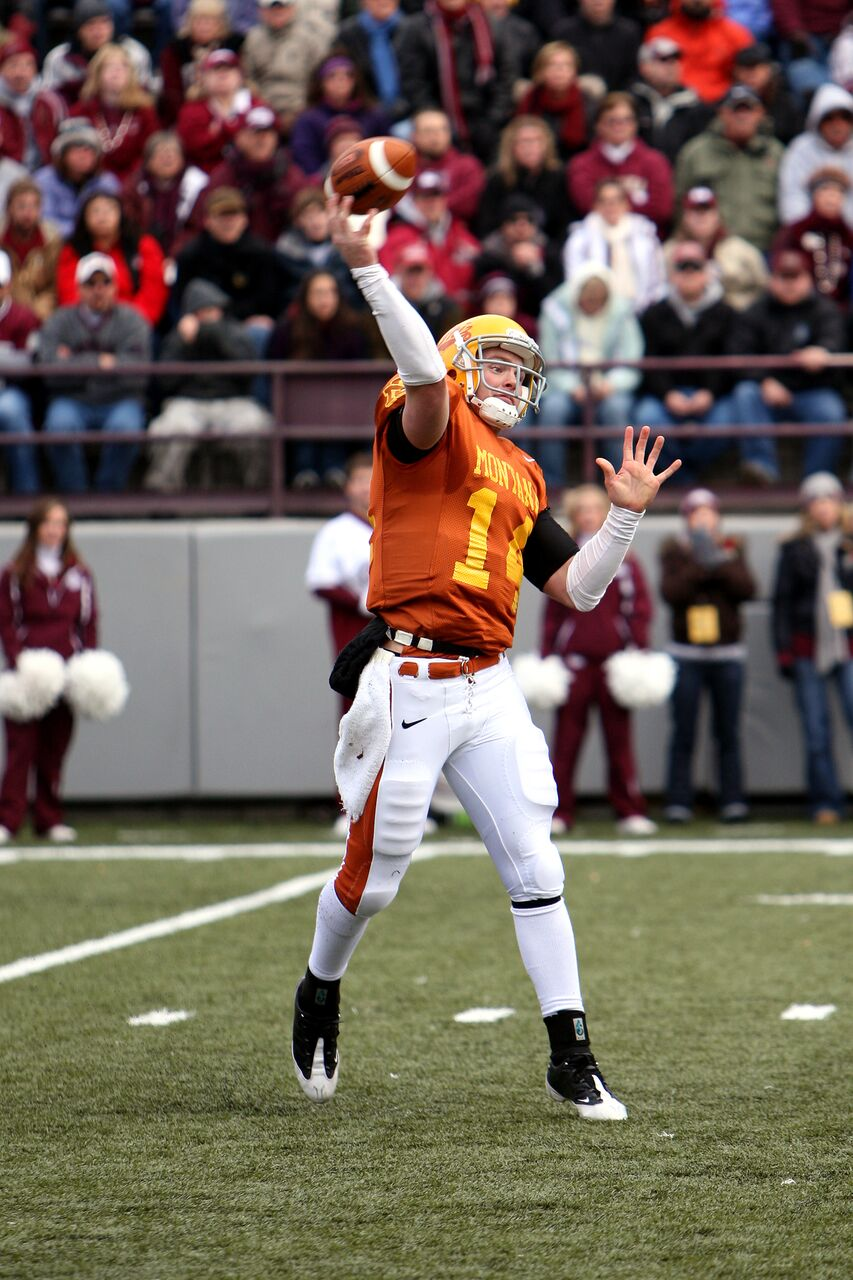
Montana quarterback Cole Bergquist

Statistics	MONT	RICH
First downs	15	16
Plays–yards	63–306	58–327
Rushes–yards	25–39	39–208
Passing yards	267	119
Passing: comp–att–int	19–38–1	13–19–0
Time of possession	28:59	31:01

Team	Category	Player	Statistics
Montana	Passing	Cole Bergquist	19–36, 267 yds, 1 INT
Montana	Rushing	Chase Reynolds	12 car, 47 yds, 1 TD
Montana	Receiving	Marc Mariani	7 rec, 172 yds
Richmond	Passing	Eric Ward	12–18, 96 yds, 1 TD
Richmond	Rushing	Josh Vaughan	23 car, 162 yds, 1 TD
Richmond	Receiving	Tre Gray	6 rec, 44 yds
