= Richmond Spiders football =

Football team for the University of Richmond

2026 Richmond Spiders football team
- First season: 1881; 145 years ago
- Athletic director: John Hardt
- Head coach: Russ Huesman; 10th season, 66–46 (.589)
- Location: Richmond, Virginia, U.S.
- Stadium: Robins Stadium (capacity: 8,217)
- NCAA division: Division I FCS
- Conference: Patriot League
- Colors: Blue and red
- All-time record: 608–651–53 (.484)
- Bowl record: 1–1 (.500)

NCAA Division I FCS championships
- 2008

Conference championships
- Virginia: 1932, 1933, 1934 SoCon: 1968, 1969, 1971, 1975 Yankee: 1987 A-10: 1998, 2000, 2005 CAA: 2007, 2009, 2012, 2015, 2023, 2024
- Consensus All-Americans: 1
- Rivalries: William & Mary (rivalry); James Madison (rivalry); VMI (rivalry)
- Uniform outfitter: Adidas
- Website: RichmondSpiders.com

The Richmond Spiders are a college football team representing the University of Richmond in Richmond, Virginia. Richmond was the NCAA Division I Football Championship Subdivision champion for the 2008 season. Richmond competes as an associate member of the Patriot League that competes in the NCAA's Division I Football Championship Subdivision. Former University of Tennessee at Chattanooga head coach Russ Huesman was named head coach of the Spiders, on December 14, 2016, replacing Danny Rocco who had departed to become head coach at the University of Delaware a day earlier.

In 2008, No. 7 Richmond beat Eastern Kentucky, Appalachian State, and Northern Iowa to advance to the NCAA Division I Football Championship against Montana. In the FCS National Championship Game on December 19, 2008, they defeated Montana 24–7 to win the first team NCAA national title for the University of Richmond in any sport.

== Rivals ==
Richmond's traditional rival in many sports is the College of William & Mary. Richmond and William & Mary have met 136 times since 1898, making the rivalry (sometimes referred to as "the South's oldest rivalry") the fourth most-played in Division I college football. Only Lafayette–Lehigh, Princeton–Yale, and Harvard–Yale have played more games. The winner of the annual W&M–Richmond match-up claims the Capital Cup (formerly the I-64 Trophy), which reflects the historical significance of the cities of Williamsburg and Richmond as the last two capitals of the Commonwealth of Virginia.

== Conference affiliations ==
- 1881–1900: Independent
- 1900–1920: Eastern Virginia Intercollegiate Athletic Association (EVIAA)
- 1911–1921: South Atlantic Intercollegiate Athletic Association (SAIAA) – participated simultaneously as a member of both organizations
- 1922–1926: Independent
- 1927–1935: Virginia Conference
- 1936–1975: Southern Conference
- 1976–1977: NCAA Division I independent
- 1978–1981: NCAA Division I-A independent
- 1982–1985: NCAA Division I-AA independent
- 1986–1996: Yankee Conference
- 1997–2006: Atlantic 10 Conference
- 2007–2024: CAA / CAA Football
- 2025–future: Patriot League

== All-Americans ==
- Walker Gillette, SE – 1969 Consensus 1st Team (FWAA-1st; NEA-1st; TSN-1st; Time-1st)
- Walker Gillette, WR – 1969 (AP-1st)
- Barty Smith, RB – 1973 (AP-3rd)
- Jeff Nixon, DB – 1976 (AP-3rd)

== Richmond Spiders in the NFL draft ==
=== Undrafted players and non-NFL draftees ===
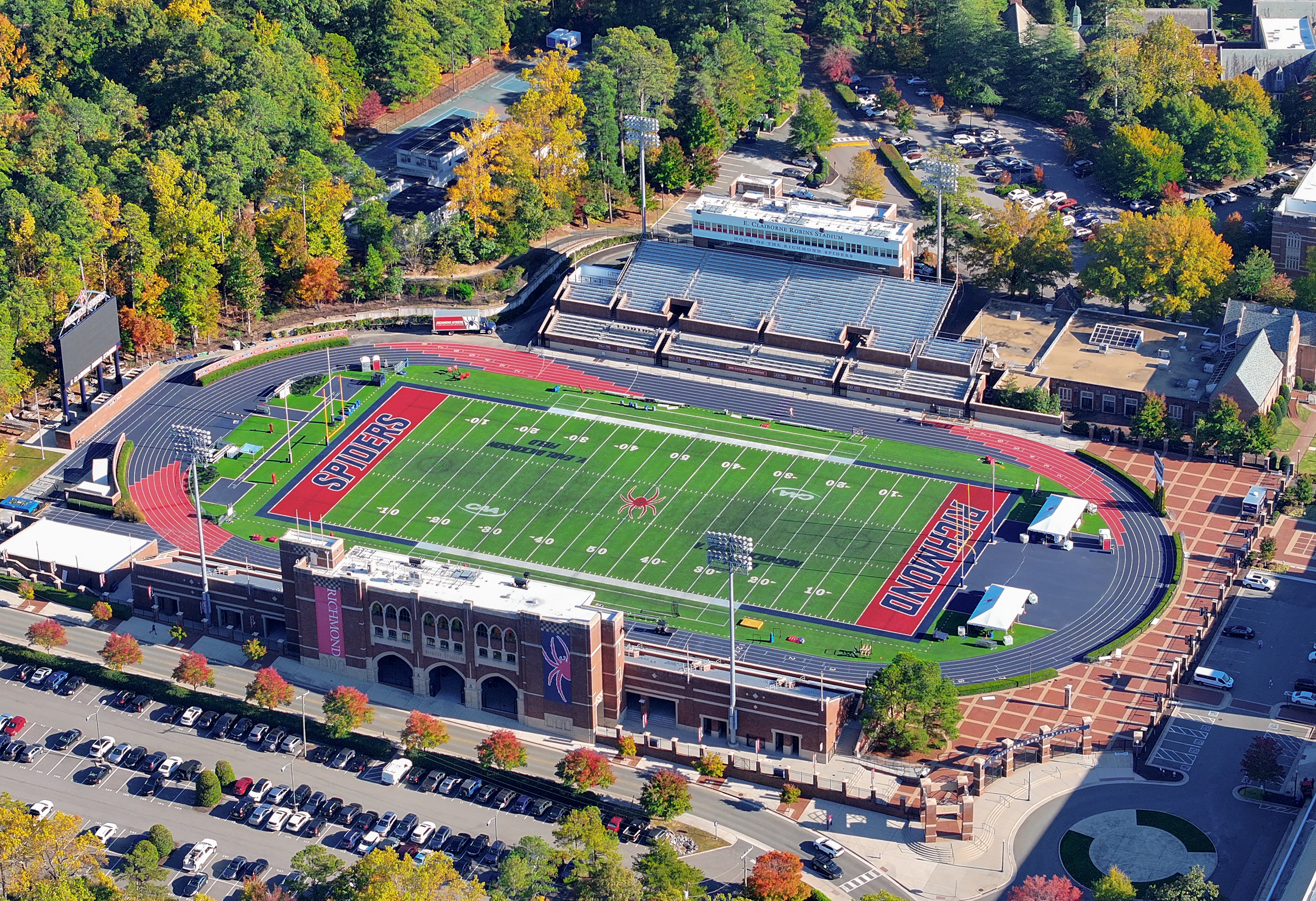
Aerial view of E. Claiborne Robins Stadium, the Spiders home

- Rick Sowieta, LB, Toronto Argonauts and Ottawa Rough Riders
- Carmen Cavalli, Oakland Raiders draft pick (1960)
- Reggie Evans, RB
- Bruce Gossett, K
- Matt Joyce, G/T
- Paris Lenon, LB
- Matt Snider, FB
- Brendan Toibin, K
- Stacy Tutt, FB
- Josh Vaughan, RB
- Danny Desriveaux, Montreal Alouettes
- Eric Ward, QB, Edmonton Eskimos (2011)
- Winston October, DB/KR, Montreal Alouettes, WR/KR, Washington Redskins and Edmonton Eskimos
- Ben Edwards, WR/KR, New York Giants
- Seth Williams, CFL player
- Martin Parker, DT
- Kerry Wynn, DE
- Kendall Gaskins, RB
- Mike Burkhead, QB
- Jacob Ruby, OL, Edmonton Eskimos
- Kyle Lauletta, QB, New York Giants
- Winston Craig, DT, Philadelphia Eagles
- David Jones, DB

== Championships ==
=== Conference championships ===
Richmond has won seventeen conference championships, four outright and thirteen shared. According to their record books, they do not claim the Virginia Conference championships.

Season	Conference	Overall Record	Conference Record
1932	Virginia Conference	4–2–2	3–0–2
1933†	Virginia Conference	5–4	2–1
1934†	Virginia Conference	8–1	2–1
1968	Southern Conference	8–3	6–0
1969†	Southern Conference	6–4	5–1
1971	Southern Conference	5–6	5–1
1975	Southern Conference	5–6	5–1
1987†	Yankee Conference	7–5	6–1
1998	Atlantic 10 Conference	9–3	7–1
2000†	Atlantic 10 Conference	10–3	7–1
2005†	Atlantic 10 Conference	9–4	7–1
2007†	Coastal Athletic Association Football Conference	11–3	7–1
2009†	Coastal Athletic Association Football Conference	11–2	7–1
2012†	Coastal Athletic Association Football Conference	8–3	6–2
2015†	Coastal Athletic Association Football Conference	10–4	6–2
2023†	Coastal Athletic Association Football Conference	9–4	7–1
2024†	Coastal Athletic Association Football Conference	10–3	8–0

† denotes co-champions

=== National championships ===
Richmond has won one national championship.

Year	Coach	Selectors	Record	Bowl
2008	Mike London	Division I FCS Playoffs	13–3	Won NCAA Division I Football Championship Game (24–7 over Montana)

== Playoffs ==
The Spiders have appeared in the Division I-AA/FCS Playoffs 14 times. Their combined record is 17–13. They were FCS National Champions in 2008.

Year	Round	Opponent	Result
1984	First Round; Quarterfinals	Boston University; Rhode Island	W 35–33; L 17–23
1987	First Round	Appalachian State	L 3–20
1998	First Round	Lehigh	L 23–24
2000	First Round; Quarterfinals	Youngstown State; Montana	W 10–3; L 20–34
2005	First Round; Quarterfinals	Hampton; Furman	W 38–10; L 20–24
2007	First Round; Quarterfinals; Semifinals	Eastern Kentucky; Wofford; Appalachian State	W 31–14; W 21–10; L 35–55
2008	First Round; Quarterfinals; Semifinals; National Championship Game	Eastern Kentucky; Appalachian State; Northern Iowa; Montana	W 38–10; W 33–13; W 21–20; W 24–7
2009	First Round; Quarterfinals	Elon; Appalachian State	W 16–13; L 31–35
2014	First Round; Second Round	Morgan State; Coastal Carolina	W 46–24; L 15–36
2015	Second Round; Quarterfinals; Semifinals	William & Mary; Illinois State; North Dakota State	W 48–13; W 39–27; L 7–33
2016	First Round; Second Round; Quarterfinals	North Carolina A&T; North Dakota; Eastern Washington	W 39–10; W 27–24; L 0–38
2022	First Round; Second Round	Davidson; Sacramento State	W 41–0; L 31–38
2023	First Round; Second Round	North Carolina Central; Albany	W 49–27; L 13–41
2024	First Round	Lehigh	L 16–20

== Bowl games ==
During their time as an NCAA University Division (Major College) team, Richmond appeared in two bowl games, both times in the Tangerine Bowl against the champion of the Mid-American Conference. They have a record of 1–1.

Year	Coach	Bowl	Opponent	Result
1968	Frank Jones	Tangerine Bowl	Ohio	W 49–42
1971	Frank Jones	Tangerine Bowl	Toledo	L 3–28

== Future non-conference opponents ==
Announced schedules as of August 31, 2026

2027	2028	2029	2030	2031	2032	2033	2034	2035
at Louisville	at Virginia	at Pittsburgh		at Virginia	at VMI	VMI		VMI
Morgan State				at Harvard	Harvard			
at Norfolk State								
at Furman								
