= 1971 The Citadel Bulldogs football team =

American college football season

1971 The Citadel Bulldogs football
- Conference: Southern Conference
- Record: 8–3 (4–2 SoCon)
- Head coach: Red Parker (6th season)
- Home stadium: Johnson Hagood Stadium

1971 Southern Conference football standings
	Conf.					Overall
Team	W		L		T	W		L		T
Richmond $	5	–	1	–	0	5	–	6	–	0
William & Mary	4	–	1	–	0	5	–	6	–	0
The Citadel	4	–	2	–	0	8	–	3	–	0
East Carolina	3	–	2	–	0	4	–	6	–	1
Furman	2	–	3	–	0	5	–	5	–	1
VMI	1	–	4	–	0	1	–	10	–	0
Davidson	0	–	6	–	0	1	–	9	–	0
$ – Conference champion

The 1971 The Citadel Bulldogs football team represented The Citadel, The Military College of South Carolina in the 1971 NCAA University Division football season. Red Parker served as head coach for the sixth season. The Bulldogs played as members of the Southern Conference and played home games at Johnson Hagood Stadium.

== Schedule ==
Date	Opponent	Site	Result	Attendance	Source
September 11	William & Mary	Johnson Hagood Stadium; Charleston, SC	L 28–35	18,200	
September 18	at Bucknell*	Memorial Stadium; Lewisburg, PA	W 38–35	6,000	
September 25	Boston University*	Johnson Hagood Stadium; Charleston, SC	W 44–37	16,200	
October 2	at East Carolina	Ficklen Memorial Stadium; Greenville, NC	L 25–31	12,232	
October 9	at VMI	Alumni Memorial Field; Lexington, VA (Military Classic of the South)	W 25–24	7,500	
October 16	Presbyterian*	Johnson Hagood Stadium; Charleston, SC	L 23–24	14,350	
October 23	Chattanooga*	Johnson Hagood Stadium; Charleston, SC	W 52–35	9,740	
October 30	Illinois State*	Johnson Hagood Stadium; Charleston, SC	W 28–0	11,500	
November 6	at Richmond	City Stadium; Richmond, VA	W 21–11	8,000	
November 13	Furman^{†}	Johnson Hagood Stadium; Charleston, SC (rivalry)	W 35–33	19,450	
November 20	at Davidson	Richardson Stadium; Davidson, NC	W 47–7	6,300	
*Non-conference game; ^{†}Homecoming
