= 2008 Cal Poly Mustangs football team =

American college football season

2008 Cal Poly Mustangs football

GWC champion

NCAA Division I First Round, L 35–49 vs. Weber State
- Conference: Great West Conference

Ranking
- Sports Network: No. 10
- FCS Coaches: No. 8
- Record: 8–3 (3–0 GWC)
- Head coach: Rich Ellerson (8th season)
- Offensive coordinator: Ian Shields (3rd season)
- Offensive scheme: Triple option
- Base defense: 4–3
- Home stadium: Alex G. Spanos Stadium

2008 Great West Conference football standings
	Conf.			Overall
Team	W		L	W		L
No. 10 Cal Poly $^	3	–	0	8	–	3
UC Davis	2	–	1	5	–	7
North Dakota	1	–	2	6	–	4
South Dakota	1	–	2	6	–	5
Southern Utah	1	–	3	4	–	7
$ – Conference champion; ^ – FCS playoff participant; Rankings from The Sports Network poll

The 2008 Cal Poly Mustangs football team represented California Polytechnic State University, San Luis Obispo as member of the Great West Conference (GWC) during the 2008 NCAA Division I FCS football season. Led by Rich Ellerson in his eighth and final season as head coach, Cal Poly compiled an overall record of 8–3 with a mark of 3–0 in conference play, winning GWC title. The Mustangs advanced to the NCAA Division I Football Championship playoffs, where they lost to Weber State in the first round. The team outscored its opponents 488 to 292 for the season, averaging over 44 points per game. Cal Poly played home games at Alex G. Spanos Stadium in San Luis Obispo, California.

Ellerson finished his eight-year tenure as head coach with a record of 56–34, for a winning percentage of .622.

== Schedule ==
Date	Opponent	Rank	Site	Result	Attendance	Source
August 30	at San Diego State*	No. 14	Qualcomm Stadium; San Diego, CA	W 29–27	26,851	
September 6	No. 5 Montana*	No. 11	Alex G. Spanos Stadium; San Luis Obispo, CA	L 28–30	10,035	
September 13	at No. 8 McNeese State*	No. 14	Cowboy Stadium; Lake Charles, LA	Cancelled		
September 20	at Northwestern State*	No. 13	Harry Turpin Stadium; Natchitoches, LA	W 52–18	8,284	
October 4	South Dakota	No. 8	Alex G. Spanos Stadium; San Luis Obispo, CA	W 49–22	11,075	
October 18	at No. 21 South Dakota State*	No. 5	Coughlin–Alumni Stadium; Brookings, SD	W 42–28	8,311	
October 25	Southern Utah	No. 6	Alex G. Spanos Stadium; San Luis Obispo, CA	W 69–41	10,075	
November 1	Idaho State*	No. 4	Alex G. Spanos Stadium; San Luis Obispo, CA	W 49–10	7,014	
November 8	North Carolina Central*	No. 3	Alex G. Spanos Stadium; San Luis Obispo, CA	W 49–3	10,825	
November 15	UC Davis	No. 3	Alex G. Spanos Stadium; San Luis Obispo, CA (Battle for the Golden Horseshoe)	W 51–28	11,075	
November 22	at Wisconsin*	No. 3	Camp Randall Stadium; Madison, WI	L 35–36 ^{OT}	80,709	
November 29	No. 12 Weber State*	No. 3	Alex G. Spanos Stadium; San Luis Obispo, CA (NCAA Division I First Round)	L 35–49	6,919	
*Non-conference game; Rankings from The Sports Network Poll released prior to the game

== Team players selected in the NFL draft ==
The following Mustang players were selected in the NFL draft.

Draft	Player	Position	Round	Overall	NFL team
2009	Ramses Barden	Wide receiver	3	85	New York Giants
2012	Asa Jackson	Cornerback	5	169	Baltimore Ravens
