= Cape Fear High School =

Public school in Cumberland County, North Carolina, US

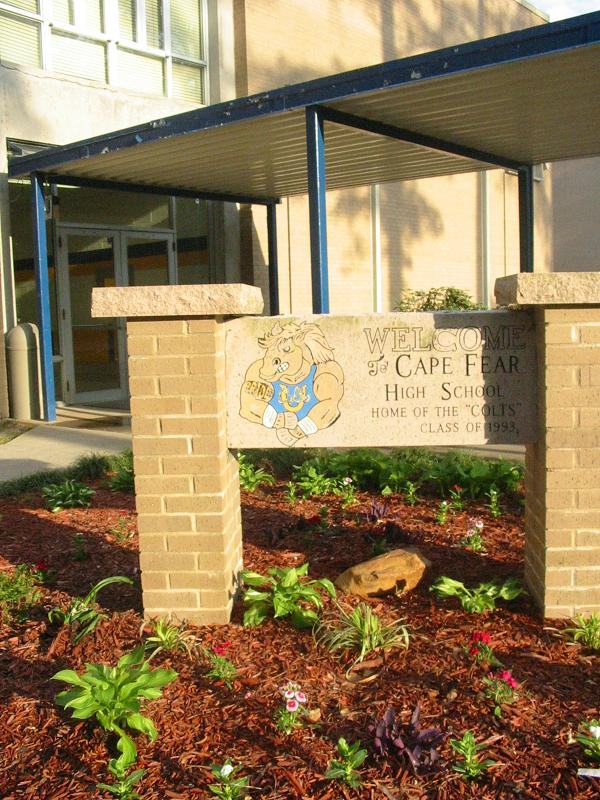

Location
- 4762 Clinton Road; Fayetteville, North Carolina 28312; United States; 35°02′05″N 78°45′44″W

Information
- Other name: Cape Fear
- Type: Public high school
- Established: 1969 (57 years ago)
- School district: Cumberland County Schools
- NCES District ID: 3700011
- Superintendent: Marvin Connelly, Jr.
- CEEB code: 341298
- NCES School ID: 370001100402
- Principal: Jason Jordan
- Teaching staff: 65.12 (on an FTE basis)
- Grades: 9–12
- Gender: Co-educational
- Enrollment: 1,515 (2024–2025)
- Student to teacher ratio: 23.26
- Schedule: 4-period block schedule
- Campus size: 45.88 acres (18.57 ha)
- Campus type: Rural
- Colors: Navy blue and gold
- Slogan: Colt Pride Never Stops!
- Athletics: NCHSAA 7A
- Athletics conference: Tri-County 6A/7A
- Nickname: Colts
- Rival: Terry Sanford High School
- USNWR ranking: 6066th (US); 172th (NC)
- Yearbook: Stampede
- Feeder schools: Mac Williams Middle School
- Website: www.ccs.k12.nc.us/o/cf

Cape Fear High School is a public secondary school in the eastern region of Cumberland County in the unincorporated community of Vander, North Carolina, to the east of Fayetteville, North Carolina. The Cape Fear school attendance area is the largest in the county by area size.

== Athletics ==
Cape Fear has varsity teams in 17 sports (13 boys teams, 14 girls teams) and junior varsity teams in 8 sports (6 boys teams, 4 girls teams):

- Baseball (boys)
- Basketball
- Bowling (no JV)
- Cheerleading (only girls Varsity)
- Cross country (no JV)
- Football (boys)
- Golf (no JV)
- Indoor track and field (no JV)
- Lacrosse (no JV)
- Soccer
- Softball (girls)
- Swimming (no JV)
- Tennis (no girls JV)
- Track and field (no JV)
- Wrestling (boys)
- Volleyball (girls)

=== State Championships ===
Cape Fear has won the following NCHSAA team state championships:

- Baseball – 1994 (3A)
- Softball – 1978 (All Classes)
- Girls' Tennis Dual Team – 2021 (3A), 2022 (3A)
- Wrestling State Tournament Team – 1984 (All Classes)

== Academy of Natural Sciences ==
The Natural Science Academy is a program located at Cape Fear that acknowledges students for completing 7 or more sciences throughout their high school career while maintaining a 3.0 unweighted GPA average in these courses.

== Extracurricular organizations ==
=== Marching band ===
In 2014, the Cape Fear marching band placed 3rd (regardless of class) in the Bands of America Winston-Salem Regional Championship.

=== Winter guard ===
The Cape Fear winter guard placed 18th in the Scholastic World division of the Winter Guard International Color Guard World Championship Semi-finals in 2017 and 20th in 2018.

=== NJROTC ===
In 2016, the Cape Fear NJROTC placed 15th in the NJROTC Nationals Drill Championship.

== Shooting ==
In October 2011, 15-year-old Catilyn Abercrombie, was shot in the neck with a rifle by fellow student, 15-year-old Charles Underwood, at Cape Fear High School. She was hospitalized for two months in a serious condition. Underwood was arrested and charged with attempted murder. He was convicted of attempted first-degree murder and sentenced to fifteen years in prison. Abercrombie was not believed by prosecutors and police to be the intended victim, as the round was meant for someone whom Underwood had a beef with. Abercrombie had settled with a North Carolina court for $2 million.

== Demographics ==
The demographic breakdown of the 1,422 students enrolled in 2020–2021 was as follows:

- Male – 51.2%
- Female – 48.8%
- Native American/Alaskan – 3.4%
- Asian – 0.8%
- Black – 26.8%
- Hispanic – 10.2%
- Hawaiian/Pacific Islander – 0.4%
- White – 51.5%
- Multiracial – 6.9%

51.2% of the students were male, and 48.8% were female. 49.3% of the students were eligible for free or reduced lunch.

== Administration ==
Jason Jordan, the current principal of Cape Fear High School, has also served as the principal of Massey Hill Classical High School. He is the sixth principal of Cape Fear.

#	Principal	Term start	Term end
1	George W.J. (Jack) Horton	1969	1983
2	Marion C Wise	1983	1998
3	Jeffery Jernigan	1998	2010
4	Lee Spruill	2010	2019
5	Brian Edkins	2019	2021
6	Jason Jordan	2021	Present

== Notable alumni ==
- David R. Lewis, member of the North Carolina General Assembly
- Gavin Williams, Major League Baseball pitcher for the Cleveland Guardians
- Seth Williams, American football defensive back

== See also ==
- Cumberland County Schools
- List of high schools in North Carolina
