= 2008 Idaho State Bengals football team =

American college football season

2008 Idaho State Bengals football
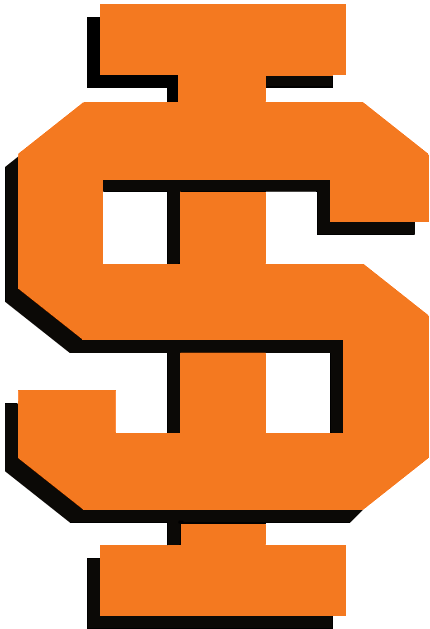
- Conference: Big Sky Conference
- Record: 1–11 (1–7 Big Sky)
- Head coach: John Zamberlin (2nd season)
- Offensive coordinator: Mike Orthmann (2nd season)
- Offensive scheme: Pro-style
- Defensive coordinator: Brian Strandley (2nd season)
- Base defense: 3–4
- Home stadium: Holt Arena

2008 Big Sky Conference football standings
	Conf.			Overall
Team	W		L	W		L
No. 2 Montana $^	7	–	1	14	–	2
No. 7 Weber State $^	7	–	1	10	–	4
Montana State	5	–	3	7	–	5
Eastern Washington	5	–	3	6	–	5
Northern Arizona	4	–	4	6	–	5
Sacramento State	3	–	5	6	–	6
Portland State	3	–	5	4	–	7
Northern Colorado	1	–	7	1	–	10
Idaho State	1	–	7	1	–	11
$ – Conference champion; ^ – FCS playoff participant; Rankings from The Sports Network poll

The 2008 Idaho State Bengals football team represented Idaho State University as a member of the Big Sky Conference during the 2008 NCAA Division I FCS football season. Led by second-year head coach John Zamberlin, the Bengals compiled an overall record of 1–11 with a mark of 1–7 in conference play, placing in a tie for last in the Big Sky. Idaho State played home games at Holt Arena in Pocatello, Idaho.

== Schedule ==
Date	Time	Opponent	Site	TV	Result	Attendance	Source
August 30	6:07 pm	at Boise State*	Bronco Stadium; Boise, ID (Battle for the Liberty Bell)	KTVB	L 7–49	32,318	
September 6	3:07 pm	at Idaho*	Kibbie Dome; Moscow, ID (rivalry)	ALT	L 27–42	15,013	
September 18	6:35 pm	North Dakota*	Holt Arena; Pocatello, ID		L 35–38	5,970	
September 27	1:37 pm	at No. 11 Eastern Washington	Woodward Field; Cheney, WA		L 31–45	5,549	
October 4	1:37 pm	Montana State	Holt Arena; Pocatello, ID	Altitude	L 21–33	6,121	
October 11	1:37 pm	at Northern Colorado	Nottingham Field; Greeley, CO		L 9–29	4,208	
October 18	6:35 pm	No. 17 Northern Arizona^{†}	Holt Arena; Pocatello, ID		L 30–52	6,697	
October 25	2:05 pm	at Portland State	PGE Park; Portland, OR		L 13–36	7,330	
November 1	7:05 pm	at No. 4 Cal Poly*	Alex G. Spanos Stadium; San Luis Obispo, CA		L 10–49	7,014	
November 8	1:37 pm	No. 9 Weber State	Holt Arena; Pocatello, ID		L 27–59	5,514	
November 15	12:07 pm	at No. 5 Montana	Washington–Grizzly Stadium; Missoula, MT	KPAX	L 10–29	23,527	
November 22	3:05 pm	Sacramento State	Holt Arena; Pocatello, ID		W 36–33 ^{2OT}	4,814	
*Non-conference game; ^{†}Homecoming; Rankings from The Sports Network Poll released prior to the game; All times are in Mountain time
