= 1971 William & Mary Indians football team =

American college football season

1971 William & Mary Indians football
- Conference: Southern Conference
- Record: 5–6 (4–1 SoCon)
- Head coach: Lou Holtz (3rd season)
- Captains: Bruce Hanson; Jackson Neall
- Home stadium: Cary Field

1971 Southern Conference football standings
	Conf.					Overall
Team	W		L		T	W		L		T
Richmond $	5	–	1	–	0	5	–	6	–	0
William & Mary	4	–	1	–	0	5	–	6	–	0
The Citadel	4	–	2	–	0	8	–	3	–	0
East Carolina	3	–	2	–	0	4	–	6	–	1
Furman	2	–	3	–	0	5	–	5	–	1
VMI	1	–	4	–	0	1	–	10	–	0
Davidson	0	–	6	–	0	1	–	9	–	0
$ – Conference champion

The 1971 William & Mary Indians football team represented the College of William & Mary as a member of the Southern Conference (SoCon) during the 1971 NCAA University Division football season. Led by Lou Holtz in his third and final year as head coach, William & Mary finished the season 5–6 overall and 4–1 in SoCon play to place second.

== Schedule ==
Date	Opponent	Site	Result	Attendance	Source
September 11	at The Citadel	Johnson Hagood Stadium; Charleston, SC	W 35–28	18,200	
September 18	at East Carolina	Ficklen Memorial Stadium; Greenville, NC	W 28–10	15,200	
September 25	Davidson	Cary Field; Williamsburg, VA	W 40–14	8,000	
October 2	at Tulane*	Tulane Stadium; New Orleans, LA	W 14–3	17,392	
October 9	West Virginia*	Cary Field; Williamsburg, VA	L 23–28	15,000	
October 16	at Virginia Tech*	Lane Stadium; Blacksburg, VA	L 30–41	20,000	
October 23	VMI	Cary Field; Williamsburg, VA (rivalry)	W 12–7	8,000	
October 30	at North Carolina*	Kenan Memorial Stadium; Chapel Hill, NC	L 35–36	38,500	
November 6	at Wake Forest*	Groves Stadium; Winston-Salem, NC	L 29–36	19,000	
November 13	at Temple*	Temple Stadium; Philadelphia, PA	L 13–17	12,500	
November 20	Richmond	Cary Field; Williamsburg, VA (rivalry)	L 19–21	13,000	
*Non-conference game
