= 2008 Eastern Washington Eagles football team =

American college football season

2008 Eastern Washington Eagles football
- Conference: Big Sky Conference
- Record: 6–5 (5–3 Big Sky)
- Head coach: Beau Baldwin (1st season)
- Offensive coordinator: Aaron Best (1st season)
- Defensive coordinator: John Graham (1st season)
- Home stadium: Woodward Field

2008 Big Sky Conference football standings
	Conf.			Overall
Team	W		L	W		L
No. 2 Montana $^	7	–	1	14	–	2
No. 7 Weber State $^	7	–	1	10	–	4
Montana State	5	–	3	7	–	5
Eastern Washington	5	–	3	6	–	5
Northern Arizona	4	–	4	6	–	5
Sacramento State	3	–	5	6	–	6
Portland State	3	–	5	4	–	7
Northern Colorado	1	–	7	1	–	10
Idaho State	1	–	7	1	–	11
$ – Conference champion; ^ – FCS playoff participant; Rankings from The Sports Network poll

The 2008 Eastern Washington Eagles football team represented Eastern Washington University as a member of the Big Sky Conference during the 2008 NCAA Division I FCS football season. Led by first-year head coach Beau Baldwin, the Eagles compiled an overall record of 6–5, with a mark of 5–3 in conference play, and finished tied for third in the Big Sky. The team played home games at Woodward Field in Cheney, Washington.

== Schedule ==
Date	Opponent	Rank	Site	Result	Attendance	Source
August 30	at No. 12 (FBS) Texas Tech*	No. 7	Jones AT&T Stadium; Lubbock, TX	L 24–49	49,887	
September 6	at Colorado*	No. 7	Folsom Field; Boulder, CO	L 24–31	46,417	
September 20	Western Washington*	No. 14	Woodward Field; Cheney, WA	W 52–31		
September 27	Idaho State	No. 11	Woodward Field; Cheney, WA	W 45–31	5,549	
October 4	at Portland State	No. 11	PGE Park; Portland, OR (rivalry)	L 36–47	7,092	
October 11	No. 12 Montana	No. 23	Woodward Field; Cheney, WA (EWU–UM Governors Cup)	L 3–19	10,830	
October 18	at Montana State		Bobcat Stadium; Bozeman, MT	W 34–17	13,547	
November 1	Sacramento State		Woodward Field; Cheney, WA	L 13–15	4,814	
November 8	at Northern Colorado		Nottingham Field; Greeley, CO	W 31–16		
November 15	Northern Arizona		Woodward Field; Cheney, WA	W 28–13	4,902	
November 22	at No. 8 Weber State		Stewart Stadium; Ogden, UT	W 33–26	8,841	
*Non-conference game; Rankings from The Sports Network Poll released prior to the game
