= 1971 East Carolina Pirates football team =

American college football season

1971 East Carolina Pirates football
- Conference: Southern Conference
- Record: 4–6 (3–2 SoCon)
- Head coach: Sonny Randle (1st season)
- Offensive coordinator: Vito Ragazzo (1st season)
- Home stadium: Ficklen Memorial Stadium

1971 Southern Conference football standings
	Conf.					Overall
Team	W		L		T	W		L		T
Richmond $	5	–	1	–	0	5	–	6	–	0
William & Mary	4	–	1	–	0	5	–	6	–	0
The Citadel	4	–	2	–	0	8	–	3	–	0
East Carolina	3	–	2	–	0	4	–	6	–	1
Furman	2	–	3	–	0	5	–	5	–	1
VMI	1	–	4	–	0	1	–	10	–	0
Davidson	0	–	6	–	0	1	–	9	–	0
$ – Conference champion

The 1971 East Carolina Pirates football team was an American football team that represented East Carolina University as a member of the Southern Conference during the 1971 NCAA University Division football season. In their first season under head coach Sonny Randle, the team compiled a 4–6 record.

== Schedule ==
Date	Time	Opponent	Site	Result	Attendance	Source
September 11	7:30 p.m.	Toledo*	Ficklen Memorial Stadium; Greenville, NC	L 0–45	15,000	
September 18		William & Mary	Ficklen Memorial Stadium; Greenville, NC	L 10–28	15,200	
September 25	1:30 p.m.	at Bowling Green*	Doyt Perry Stadium; Bowling Green, OH	L 21–47	14,689	
October 2		The Citadel	Ficklen Memorial Stadium; Greenville, NC	W 31–25	12,232	
October 9		Richmond	Ficklen Memorial Stadium; Greenville, NC	L 7–14	14,235	
October 16		at West Virginia*	Mountaineer Field; Morgantown, WV	L 21–44	27,000	
October 23		at NC State*	Carter Stadium; Raleigh, NC (rivalry)	W 31–15	18,000	
October 30		Furman	Ficklen Memorial Stadium; Greenville, NC	W 26–13	13,186	
November 6		Davidson	Ficklen Memorial Stadium; Greenville, NC	W 27–26	17,732	
November 13		at Tampa*	Tampa Stadium; Tampa, FL	L 7–43	17,092–17,902	
*Non-conference game; All times are in Eastern time

== Roster ==
1971 East Carolina Pirates football team roster
Players
Coaches
Offense

Pos.	#	Name	Class
G	64	Terry Cumberworth	Jr
OT	70	Paul Haug	Sr
RB	40	Les Strayhorn	Jr
QB	10	Carl Summerell	So

Defense

Pos.	#	Name	Class
LB	76	Tom Frazier	Jr
DB	22	Terry Kelly	Jr
LB	42	Don Mollenhauer	Sr
DB	12	Jack Patterson	Sr
LB	45	Jim Post	Jr

Special teams

Pos.	#	Name	Class

Head coach

- Sonny Randle

Coordinators/assistant coaches

Legend

- (C) Team captain
- (S) Suspended
- (I) Ineligible
- Injured
- Redshirt
