= 1971 Davidson Wildcats football team =

American college football season

1971 Davidson Wildcats football
- Conference: Southern Conference
- Record: 1–9 (0–6 SoCon)
- Head coach: Dave Fagg (2nd season)
- Home stadium: Richardson Stadium

1971 Southern Conference football standings
	Conf.					Overall
Team	W		L		T	W		L		T
Richmond $	5	–	1	–	0	5	–	6	–	0
William & Mary	4	–	1	–	0	5	–	6	–	0
The Citadel	4	–	2	–	0	8	–	3	–	0
East Carolina	3	–	2	–	0	4	–	6	–	1
Furman	2	–	3	–	0	5	–	5	–	1
VMI	1	–	4	–	0	1	–	10	–	0
Davidson	0	–	6	–	0	1	–	9	–	0
$ – Conference champion

The 1971 Davidson Wildcats football team represented Davidson College as a member of the Southern Conference (SoCon) during the 1971 NCAA University Division football season. Led by second-year head coach Dave Fagg, the Wildcats compiled an overall record of 1–9 with a mark of 0–6 in conference play, placing last out of seven teams in the SoCon.

== Schedule ==
Date	Opponent	Site	Result	Attendance	Source
September 11	at Wake Forest*	Groves Stadium; Winston-Salem, NC	L 7–27	19,500	
September 18	at VMI	Alumni Memorial Field; Lexington, VA	L 3–27	5,500	
September 25	at William & Mary	Cary Field; Williamsburg, VA	L 14–40	8,000	
October 2	vs. Appalachian State*	American Legion Memorial Stadium; Charlotte, NC	L 10–35	5,626	
October 9	at Bucknell*	Memorial Stadium; Lewisburg, PA	W 20–8	8,600	
October 16	at Furman	Sirrine Stadium; Greenville, SC	L 6–41	6,500	
October 23	Wofford*^{†}	Richardson Stadium; Davidson, NC	L 22–23	1,800	
November 6	at East Carolina	Ficklen Memorial Stadium; Greenville, NC	L 26–27	17,732	
November 13	Richmond	Richardson Stadium; Davidson, NC	L 7–14	2,800	
November 20	The Citadel	Richardson Stadium; Davidson, NC	L 7–47	6,300	
*Non-conference game; ^{†}Homecoming
