= Sonny Randle =

American football player (1936–2017)

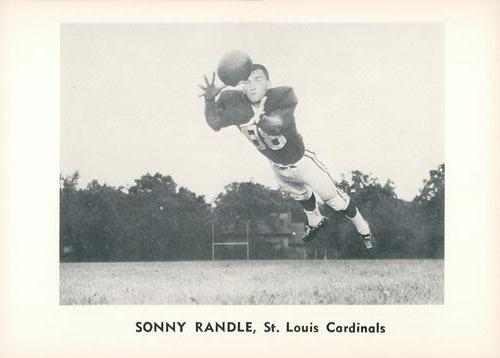
- Randle in 1961

No. 88, 83
- Positions: Wide receiver, end

Personal information
- Born: January 6, 1936; Cohasset, Virginia, U.S.
- Died: May 23, 2017 (aged 81); Harrisonburg, Virginia, U.S.
- Listed height: 6 ft 2 in (1.88 m)
- Listed weight: 189 lb (86 kg)

Career information
- High school: Fork Union Military Academy (Fork Union, Virginia)
- College: Virginia (1956–1958)
- NFL draft: 1958: 19th round, 218th overall pick

Career history

Playing
- Chicago/St. Louis Cardinals (1959–1966); San Francisco 49ers (1967–1968); Dallas Cowboys (1968); Washington Redskins (1969)*
- * Offseason or practice squad member only

Coaching
- East Carolina (1970) Wide receivers coach; East Carolina (1971–1973) Head coach; Virginia (1974–1975) Head coach; Massanutten Military Academy (1976–1977) Athletic director and head coach; Marshall (1979–1983) Head coach

Awards and highlights
- First-team All-Pro (1960); Second-team All-Pro (1962); 4× Pro Bowl (1960–1962, 1965); NFL receiving touchdowns leader (1960); Second-team All-ACC (1958); Virginia Sports Hall of Fame (1991)

Career NFL statistics
- Receptions: 365
- Receiving yards: 5,996
- Receiving touchdowns: 65
- Stats at Pro Football Reference

Head coaching record
- Regular season: NCAA: 39–69–1 (.362)

Ulmo Shannon "Sonny" Randle Jr. (January 6, 1936 – May 23, 2017) was an American sportscaster and football player and coach. He played wide receiver in the National Football League (NFL) for the Chicago Cardinals/St. Louis Cardinals, San Francisco 49ers and Dallas Cowboys. Randle played college football at the University of Virginia.

== Early life ==
Sonny was the son of Ulmo Shannon Randle Sr, and his second wife Lillian Arliser Dixon. U.S (as Ulmo Sr preferred to be called) was a wealthy heir to a real estate empire, and his main passions involved going fast and animals. His award winning horses were known all around the country. His marriage with Lillian lasted barely long enough for her to have two children. Sonny, and his younger brother David.

U.S attempted to get custody of the boys in the divorce, but as was the norm in that era, it was given to the mother.

Sonny attended Fork Union Military Academy during his elementary and high school years. He focused on track and field, competing in different events and clocking 9.8 seconds in the 100-yard dash in 1954, which was a school record that stood until 1982, earning him All-American honors and an invitation to the U.S. Olympic Trials. Randle held the school record in the 400 metres (50.8 seconds) from 1954 until 1960. In the 200 metres, he ranked second in school history until 1955. Randle achieved these records on cinder tracks, instead of the faster modern synthetic tracks.

Randle did not play football until his senior year, because his athletic director Gus Lacy (who also served as his guardian) feared he would get hurt. Randle fractured his clavicle in his third game. He also practiced basketball. Sonny, along with his younger brother, had the distinction of attending Fork Union Military Academy as a cadet for the longest time (over twelve years).

== College career ==
VMI offered Randle a scholarship, but he did not adapt and returned home before the end of his first year. He decided to walk-on to the University of Virginia and eventually earned a football scholarship.

In Randle's first two seasons, he did not have an impact, because he played as a wingback in the team's run-oriented offense. In 1957, as the offense began changing into more of an open passing attack, he ranked second on the team with 14 receptions for 168 yards. In 1958, Randle finished second in the NCAA with 47 receptions and first in kickoff returns (24.1 ypr). He posted 47 receptions for 642 yards, 1,253 all-purpose yards, 506 kickoff yards and 5 touchdowns.

In college, Randle also practiced basketball (one season) and track (four seasons), where he set a record by running the 100-yard dash in 9.6 seconds. He ran the 220-yard dash in 20.7 seconds.

In 1991, Randle was inducted into the Virginia Sports Hall of Fame.

== Professional career ==
=== Chicago/St. Louis Cardinals ===
Randle was selected by the Chicago Cardinals in the 19th round (218th overall) of the 1958 NFL draft, with a future draft pick, which allowed the team to draft him before his college eligibility was over.

In 1959, although he was one of the fastest players in the league as a rookie, he had trouble adapting to the professional game, registering only 15 receptions, but veteran defensive backs Dick 'Night Train' Lane and Jimmy Hill taught him how to get open.

In only his second season in the NFL, Randle had a break-out year registering 62 receptions (second on the league) for 893 yards and 15 touchdowns (led the league) and was named first-team All-Pro by the Associated Press (AP), The Sporting News and UPI.

In 1961, his numbers fell with Sam Etcheverry at quarterback, posting 44 receptions for 591 yards and 9 touchdowns. The next year Charley Johnson took over at quarterback and he finished with 63 receptions (second on the league) for 1,158 yards (second on the league), with an 18.4 average per reception and 7 touchdowns.

On November 4, 1962, Randle had at the time the second best game statistically by a wide receiver in NFL history as he caught 16 passes for 256 yards in a game against the New York Giants. He finished the season with 63 receptions for 1,158 yards, 8 touchdown catches and was named second-team All-Pro by UPI.

Randle once again passed the 1,000-yard receiving mark in 1963, finishing with 51 receptions for 1,014 yards and 12 touchdowns (fourth on the league).

In 1964, he suffered a serious shoulder separation and was lost for the season after the seventh game. At the time he was on pace for third straight 1,000-yard season.

In 1966, he was limited with a fractured hand and although he didn't miss any games, he only recorded 17 receptions for 218 yards and 2 touchdowns.

On September 14, 1967, after drafting wide receiver Dave Williams in the first round, the Cardinals traded him to the San Francisco 49ers in exchange for a second round draft choice (#42-Bob Atkins). He left the Cardinals as the franchise's second all-time leading wide receiver. In 1988, he was named to the All-time Cardinal Team.

=== San Francisco 49ers ===
In 1967, he appeared in 14 games (10 starts), registering 33 receptions for 502 yards and 4 touchdowns. In 1968, he was released after playing in 3 games on October 11.

=== Dallas Cowboys ===
On October 16, 1968, he was signed by the Dallas Cowboys for depth purposes. He appeared in 6 games as a reserve and had one reception for 12 yards. On July 16, 1969, he was traded to the Washington Redskins.

=== Washington Redskins ===
In 1969, he was acquired by the Washington Redskins and was moved to tight end under head coach Vince Lombardi. He was injured in a preseason game and was released on September 16.

Randle finished his career with 65 touchdown receptions in 120 games, currently placing him 12th on the NFL's all-time TD-per-game list (minimum 60 TDs). His 65 TD catches were also the most in the NFL during the 1960s; Don Maynard caught 84 and Lance Alworth caught 77 in the American Football League (AFL).

== Coaching career ==
In 1961, Bing Devine the general manager of baseball's St. Louis Cardinals, asked him to work with his players on improving their running technique, for which future Hall of Famer Lou Brock gave him credit for his success stealing bases.

In 1970, he became an assistant coach at East Carolina University and was a part a of the coaching staff during the 17–14 win against Marshall University, which would later be involved in a plane crash on the way home, that killed 75 people: 37 football players, five coaches, two athletic trainers, the athletic director, 25 boosters, and a plane crew of five. He became the Pirates' head coach in 1971, leading the team to back-to-back Southern Conference championships in 1972 and 1973. He was named the conference's coach of the year in both years.

He then spent two years as head coach at his alma mater, the University of Virginia (1974–1975), two seasons at Massanutten Military Academy (1976–1977) as head football coach and athletic director, and five seasons at Marshall University (1979–1983) as the football head coach.

In 2009, he was inducted into the East Carolina Athletics Hall of Fame.

== Broadcasting career ==
In the 1960s, Randle began his broadcasting while still playing for the Cardinals. In the mid-1980s, he was active in sports broadcasting, participating in radio broadcasts of college football games as a color commentator in St. Louis, Virginia and West Virginia. In 1991, Randle started S-R Sports, a syndicated talk radio network based in Virginia. He retired from broadcasting in 2014.

== NFL career statistics ==
Legend
	Won the NFL championship
	Led the league
**Bold**	Career high

=== Regular season ===
Year	Team	Games		Receiving				
Year	Team	GP	GS	Rec	Yds	Avg	Lng	TD
1959	CRD	10	0	15	202	13.5	31	1
1960	STL	12	12	62	893	14.4	57	**15**
1961	STL	**14**	**14**	44	591	13.4	41	9
1962	STL	**14**	**14**	**63**	**1,158**	18.4	**86**	7
1963	STL	**14**	13	51	1,014	19.9	68	12
1964	STL	7	7	25	517	**20.7**	50	5
1965	STL	**14**	**14**	51	845	16.6	72	9
1966	STL	**14**	11	17	218	12.8	45	2
1967	SF	**14**	10	33	502	15.2	58	4
1968	SF	3	0	3	44	14.7	29	1
1968	DAL	6	0	1	12	12.0	12	0
Career		122	95	365	5,996	16.4	86	65

== Head coaching record ==
=== College ===
Year	Team	Overall	Conference	Standing	Bowl/playoffs
**East Carolina Pirates** (Southern Conference) (1971–1973)
1971	East Carolina	4–6	3–2	4th	
1972	East Carolina	9–2	6–0	1st	
1973	East Carolina	9–2	7–0	1st	
East Carolina:		22–10	17–2		
**Virginia Cavaliers** (Atlantic Coast Conference) (1974–1975)
1974	Virginia	4–7	1–5	6th	
1975	Virginia	1–10	0–4	7th	
Virginia:		5–17	1–9		
**Marshall Thundering Herd** (Southern Conference) (1979–1983)
1979	Marshall	1–10	0–6	8th	
1980	Marshall	2–8–1	0–5–1	8th	
1981	Marshall	2–9	1–5	8th	
1982	Marshall	3–8	1–6	8th	
1983	Marshall	4–7	3–4	5th	
Marshall:		12–42–1	5–26–1		
Total:		39–69–1			
National championship Conference title Conference division title or championship game berth

== Personal life ==
On May 23, 2017, he died at the age of 81 after a period of declining health.

== See also ==
- List of NCAA major college football yearly punt and kickoff return leaders
