= 2008 Montana State Bobcats football team =

American college football season

2008 Montana State Bobcats football
- Conference: Big Sky Conference
- Record: 7–5 (5–3 Big Sky)
- Head coach: Rob Ash (2nd season)
- Defensive coordinator: Jamie Marshall (2nd season)
- Home stadium: Bobcat Stadium

2008 Big Sky Conference football standings
	Conf.			Overall
Team	W		L	W		L
No. 2 Montana $^	7	–	1	14	–	2
No. 7 Weber State $^	7	–	1	10	–	4
Montana State	5	–	3	7	–	5
Eastern Washington	5	–	3	6	–	5
Northern Arizona	4	–	4	6	–	5
Sacramento State	3	–	5	6	–	6
Portland State	3	–	5	4	–	7
Northern Colorado	1	–	7	1	–	10
Idaho State	1	–	7	1	–	11
$ – Conference champion; ^ – FCS playoff participant; Rankings from The Sports Network poll

The 2008 Montana State Bobcats football team represented Montana State University as a member of the Big Sky Conference in the 2008 NCAA Division I FCS football season. The Bobcats were led by second-year head coach Rob Ash and played their home games at Bobcat Stadium. They finished the season 7–5 overall and 6–3 in the Big Sky to finish in third place. Demetrius Crawford was the team's leading rusher.

Montana State's four non-conference games are against Adams State, an NCAA Division II team from Colorado, at Kansas State and Minnesota, both NCAA Division I Football Bowl Subdivision (FBS) teams, and South Dakota a fellow NCAA Division I Football Championship Subdivision (FCS) team.

== Schedule ==
Date	Time	Opponent	Site	TV	Result	Attendance	Source
August 30	1:00 p.m.	Adams State*	Bobcat Stadium; Bozeman, MT	BSN	W 59–3	13,767	
September 6	5:05 p.m.	at Kansas State*	Bill Snyder Family Football Stadium; Manhattan, KS	FCS	L 10–69	45,241	
September 13	10:00 a.m.	at Minnesota*	Hubert H. Humphrey Metrodome; Minneapolis, MN	BTN	L 23–35	43,929	
September 27	1:00 p.m.	South Dakota*	Bobcat Stadium; Bozeman, MT	BSN	W 37–18	14,047	
October 4	1:30 p.m.	at Idaho State	Holt Arena; Pocatello, ID	Altitude	W 33–21	6,121	
October 11	1:30 p.m.	No. 22 Weber State	Bobcat Stadium; Bozeman, MT	BSN	L 12–35	14,447	
October 18	1:00 p.m.	Eastern Washington	Bobcat Stadium; Bozeman, MT	BSN	L 17–34	13,547	
October 25	3:00 p.m.	at Sacramento State	Hornet Stadium; Sacramento, CA	BSN	W 31–20	6,138	
November 1	12:00 p.m.	Northern Colorado	Bobcat Stadium; Bozeman, MT	BSN	W 20–7	12,148	
November 8	3:00 p.m.	at Northern Arizona	Walkup Skydome; Flagstaff, AZ	BSN	W 25–23	5,777	
November 15	12:00 p.m.	Portland State	Bobcat Stadium; Bozeman, MT	BSN	W 49–32	12,478	
November 22	12:00 p.m.	No. 5 Montana	Washington–Grizzly Stadium; Missoula, MT (rivalry)	BSN	L 3–35	25,629	
*Non-conference game; Rankings from The Sports Network Poll released prior to the game; All times are in Mountain time
