= Capital Cup =

American college football rivalry

- Richmond Spiders William & Mary Tribe
- Sport: Football
- First meeting: November 19, 1898; Richmond, 15–0
- Latest meeting: November 21, 2026; Richmond, 17–16
- Next meeting: November 20, 2027
- Stadiums: E. Claiborne Robins Stadium (Richmond); Zable Stadium (William & Mary)
- Trophy: Capital Cup (current); I-64 Trophy (former)

Statistics
- Total meetings: 137
- All-time series: Richmond, 68–64–5 (.515) (Note: During the early twentieth century, William & Mary and Richmond would occasionally play two or even three times per season since there were so few teams in the area. Thus it is not a mistake if the W-L column has identical years in them (the teams may have split the season 1–1, for example).)
- Largest victory: Richmond, 48–0 (1907, 1916)
- Longest win streak: William & Mary, 15 (1939–1954)
- Current win streak: Richmond, 4 (2023–present)

Locations of Richmond and William & Mary

The Capital Cup is the trophy given to the winner of the annual college football rivalry game contested yearly between the University of Richmond Spiders and College of William & Mary Tribe. Coined as the "Oldest Rivalry in the South", the series is one of the longest-running college football rivalries in the United States. Only three rivalries in NCAA Division I have more games played: Lafayette–Lehigh, Princeton–Yale, and Harvard–Yale.

== History ==
The Capital Cup is one of the oldest collegiate American football rivalries, played between the University of Richmond Spiders and the College of William & Mary Tribe. The yearly contest is the fourth-most-played game in Division I college football, and through the 2025 matchup has been played 136 times. Though starting six years later than what is more commonly called the South's Oldest Rivalry between Virginia and North Carolina, this rivalry between Richmond and William & Mary was more often played twice per year in its early days instead of just once. In 1905, it was played three times. Played nearly continuously since 1898, there have only been four years that the game did not occur: 1900, 1902, 1943, and 2020. From 1984 through 2008, the game was known as the I-64 Bowl. Beginning in 2009, however, the game was officially renamed the Capital Cup, for which a new trophy was created. The Capital Cup name was chosen to honor the entire 119-game history of the rivalry between the two schools and the status of the two cities as two of the historic capitals of the Commonwealth of Virginia. The matchup is typically played as the final regular season game for both teams, but for many years used to be played on Thanksgiving Day.

With CAA Football not playing in fall 2020 due to the COVID-19 pandemic, the Spiders and Tribe did not meet during a calendar year for the first time since 1943. Instead, the two teams were scheduled to meet twice in the spring of 2021 as part of a pared-down schedule of conference games, although the second meeting ended up being canceled due to COVID-19 related protocols.

On May 14, 2024, Richmond announced they were moving to the Patriot League as a football only member beginning in the 2025 season. The two teams scheduled a non–conference game for 2025, and further announced an extension of the series through the 2030 season. On April 25, 2025, William & Mary announced that were moving to the Patriot League as an associate member for football beginning in the 2026 season, while 20 of their 22 sports teams will remain in the CAA.

== Trophy ==
The I-64 Trophy was the trophy that went to the winner of the annual William & Mary versus Richmond football game from 1984 through 2008. Both Division I schools participate in the NCAA Football Championship Subdivision (formerly Division I-AA). The name for the trophy came from Interstate 64, which connects the schools through the short distance between Richmond and Williamsburg. The I-64 Trophy was replaced in 2009 with the Capital Cup, which honors the entire history of the rivalry between the two schools and the status of the two cities as the last two capitals of the Commonwealth of Virginia.

== Game results ==
Richmond victories	William & Mary victories	Tie games

No.	Date	Location	Winner	Score
1	November 19, 1898	Richmond	Richmond	15–0
2	October 21, 1899	Richmond	Richmond	14–0
3	November 9, 1901	Williamsburg	Richmond	27–11
4	November 14, 1903	Richmond	Richmond	24–0
5	November 4, 1904	Williamsburg	William & Mary	15–6
6	October 11, 1905	Richmond	Tie	0–0
7	October 21, 1905	Richmond	William & Mary	4–0
8	November 11, 1905	Richmond	Richmond	23–5
9	November 3, 1906	Williamsburg	Richmond	24–0
10	November 28, 1906	Newport News	Richmond	6–0
11	November 28, 1907	Newport News	Richmond	48–0
12	November 21, 1908	Richmond	William & Mary	21–18
13	November 20, 1909	Richmond	William & Mary	15–0
14	November 19, 1910	Richmond	William & Mary	18–6
15	November 11, 1911	Williamsburg	William & Mary	3–0
16	November 9, 1912	Richmond	Richmond	20–0
17	November 8, 1913	Newport News	Richmond	20–13
18	November 22, 1913	Williamsburg	Richmond	20–13
19	October 24, 1914	Williamsburg	Richmond	7–3
20	November 21, 1914	Richmond	Richmond	32–0
21	October 23, 1915	Williamsburg	Richmond	28–0
22	November 20, 1915	Richmond	Richmond	45–0
23	October 28, 1916	Richmond	Richmond	48–0
24	November 18, 1916	Williamsburg	Tie	0–0
25	October 13, 1917	Richmond	Richmond	28–0
26	November 17, 1917	Williamsburg	Richmond	19–0
27	November 30, 1918	Williamsburg	Richmond	7–0
28	October 18, 1919	Williamsburg	William & Mary	7–0
29	November 8, 1919	Richmond	Richmond	17–0
30	November 27, 1919	Richmond	Richmond	21–0
31	October 20, 1920	Norfolk	Richmond	13–0
32	November 24, 1921	Richmond	Richmond	17–7
33	November 30, 1922	Williamsburg	Richmond	13–3
34	November 29, 1923	Richmond	William & Mary	27–6
35	November 27, 1924	Richmond	William & Mary	20–6
36	November 26, 1925	Richmond	William & Mary	14–0
37	November 25, 1926	Richmond	William & Mary	14–0
38	November 24, 1927	Richmond	Tie	0–0
39	November 29, 1928	Richmond	William & Mary	7–0
40	November 28, 1929	Richmond	William & Mary	25–0
41	November 27, 1930	Richmond	William & Mary	19–0
42	November 26, 1931	Richmond	Richmond	6–2
43	November 24, 1932	Richmond	Richmond	18–7
44	November 30, 1933	Richmond	William & Mary	6–0
45	November 29, 1934	Richmond	Richmond	6–0
46	November 27, 1935	Richmond	Tie	6–6
47	November 26, 1936	Richmond	Richmond	7–0
48	November 25, 1937	Richmond	Richmond	6–0
49	November 24, 1938	Richmond	Richmond	10–7
50	November 25, 1939	Richmond	William & Mary	7–0
51	November 21, 1940	Richmond	William & Mary	16–0
52	November 20, 1941	Richmond	William & Mary	33–3
53	November 26, 1942	Richmond	William & Mary	10–0
54	November 30, 1944	Richmond	William & Mary	40–0
55	November 22, 1945	Richmond	William & Mary	33–0
56	November 28, 1946	Richmond	William & Mary	40–0
57	November 27, 1947	Richmond	William & Mary	35–0
58	October 30, 1948	Williamsburg	William & Mary	14–6
59	October 29, 1949	Richmond	William & Mary	34–0
60	December 2, 1950	Williamsburg	William & Mary	40–6
61	October 27, 1951	Richmond	William & Mary	20–14
62	October 24, 1952	Williamsburg	William & Mary	42–13
63	November 14, 1953	Richmond	William & Mary	21–0
64	November 25, 1954	Richmond	William & Mary	2–0
65	November 24, 1955	Richmond	Tie	6–6
66	November 22, 1956	Richmond	Richmond	6–0
67	November 28, 1957	Richmond	Richmond	12–7
68	November 27, 1958	Richmond	William & Mary	18–15
69	November 21, 1959	Richmond	Richmond	20–12

No.	Date	Location	Winner	Score
70	November 24, 1960	Richmond	Richmond	19–0
71	November 23, 1961	Richmond	Richmond	36–18
72	November 22, 1962	Richmond	Richmond	15–3
73	November 23, 1963	Richmond	William & Mary	29–6
74	November 26, 1964	Richmond	William & Mary	33–13
75	November 20, 1965	Williamsburg	William & Mary	21–0
76	November 19, 1966	Richmond	William & Mary	35–19
77	November 19, 1967	Williamsburg	Richmond	16–7
78	November 23, 1968	Richmond	Richmond	31–6
79	November 22, 1969	Williamsburg	Richmond	28–17
80	November 21, 1970	Richmond	William & Mary	34–33
81	November 20, 1971	Williamsburg	Richmond	21–19
82	November 18, 1972	Richmond	Richmond	20–3
83	November 17, 1973	Williamsburg	Richmond	31–0
84	November 23, 1974	Richmond	William & Mary	54–12
85	November 22, 1975	Williamsburg	William & Mary	31–21
86	November 20, 1976	Richmond	Richmond	21–10
87	November 19, 1977	Williamsburg	William & Mary	29–13
88	November 18, 1978	Richmond	Richmond	17–3
89	November 17, 1979	Williamsburg	William & Mary	24–10
90	November 22, 1980	Richmond	Richmond	26–14
91	November 21, 1981	Williamsburg	William & Mary	35–21
92	November 20, 1982	Richmond	William & Mary	28–17
93	November 19, 1983	Williamsburg	William & Mary	24–15
94	November 17, 1984	Richmond	Richmond	33–31
95	November 16, 1985	Williamsburg	William & Mary	28–17
96	November 22, 1986	Richmond	William & Mary	21–14
97	November 21, 1987	Williamsburg	William & Mary	20–7
98	November 19, 1988	Richmond	Richmond	24–19
99	November 18, 1989	Williamsburg	William & Mary	22–10
100	November 17, 1990	Richmond	William & Mary	31–10
101	November 23, 1991	Williamsburg	William & Mary	49–7
102	November 21, 1992	Richmond	William & Mary	34–19
103	November 20, 1993	Williamsburg	William & Mary	31–17
104	November 19, 1994	Richmond	William & Mary	21–20
105	November 11, 1995	Williamsburg	William & Mary	27–7
106	November 16, 1996	Richmond	William & Mary	28–13
107	November 15, 1997	Williamsburg	William & Mary	10–7
108	November 21, 1998	Richmond	Richmond	42–17
109	November 20, 1999	Richmond	William & Mary	34–14
110	November 18, 2000	Williamsburg	Richmond	21–18
111	November 17, 2001	Richmond	William & Mary	23–20
112	November 23, 2002	Williamsburg	Richmond	35–13
113	November 22, 2003	Richmond	William & Mary	59–21
114	November 20, 2004	Williamsburg	William & Mary	38–14
115	November 19, 2005	Richmond	Richmond	41–7
116	November 18, 2006	Williamsburg	Richmond	31–14
117	November 17, 2007	Richmond	Richmond	31–20
118	November 22, 2008	Williamsburg	Richmond	23–20^{OT}
119	November 21, 2009	Richmond	Richmond	13–10
120	November 20, 2010	Williamsburg	William & Mary	41–3
121	November 19, 2011	Richmond	William & Mary	25–23
122	November 17, 2012	Williamsburg	Richmond	21–14
123	November 23, 2013	Richmond	Richmond	31–20
124	November 22, 2014	Williamsburg	Richmond	34–20
125	November 21, 2015	Richmond	Richmond	20–9
126	December 5, 2015	Richmond	Richmond	48–13
127	November 19, 2016	Williamsburg	William & Mary	34–13
128	November 18, 2017	Richmond	Richmond	27–20
129	November 17, 2018	Williamsburg	Richmond	10–6
130	November 23, 2019	Richmond	William & Mary	21–15^{OT}
131	March 6, 2021	Richmond	Richmond	21–14
132	November 20, 2021	Williamsburg	Richmond	20–17
133	November 19, 2022	Richmond	William & Mary	37–26
134	November 18, 2023	Williamsburg	Richmond	27–26
135	November 23, 2024	Richmond	Richmond	27–0
136	November 22, 2025	Williamsburg	Richmond	28–21
137	November 21, 2026	Richmond	Richmond	17–16
Series: Richmond leads 68–64–5

== Game MVPs ==
A Most Valuable Player (MVP) Award was established 2009, coinciding with the rivalry's renaming to Capital Cup.

Season	MVP	Team	Position	Notes
2009	Eric Ward	Richmond	Quarterback	Completed 24 of 36 passes (66.7%) for 221 yards
2010	Mike Callahan	William & Mary	Quarterback	Completed 17 of 22 passes (77.2%) for a career-high 331 yards and two touchdowns
2011	Jonathan Grimes	William & Mary	Running back	Attempted a then school-record 39 rushes for 205 yards and one touchdown
2012	Kendall Gaskins	Richmond	Fullback	Rushed for 73 yards and one touchdown and caught one 7-yard touchdown pass
2013	Seth Fisher	Richmond	Fullback	Rushed for a career-high 131 yards and two touchdowns
2014	Michael Strauss	Richmond	Quarterback	Completed 29 of 40 passes (72.5%) for 291 yards and two touchdowns
2015	Jacobi Green	Richmond	Running back	Attempted 36 rushes for 217 yards and one touchdown and caught one pass for 8 yards
2016	Kendell Anderson	William & Mary	Running back	Attempted school-record 42 rushes for 219 yards and two touchdowns
2017	Xavier Goodall	Richmond	Running back	Attempted 23 rushes for career-high 180 yards and two touchdowns
2018	Dale Matthews, Jr.	Richmond	Linebacker	Converted a 4th-and-4 on a fake punt; recorded an interception near the red zone
2019	Isaiah Jones	William & Mary	Linebacker	Recorded nine tackles (four TFLs), two sacks, a forced fumble, and a fumble recovery
2020	Game played on March 6, 2021, due to the COVID-19 pandemic which delayed the 2020 CAA Football season; no game MVP was awarded.			
2021	Tyler Dressler	Richmond	Linebacker	Recorded 11 tackles (0.5 TFLs) and two quarterback hurries
2022	Darius Wilson	William & Mary	Quarterback	Completed 9 of 13 passes (69.2%) for 227 yards and one touchdown while rushing for 42 yards and two touchdowns on six carries
2023	Kyle Wickersham	Richmond	Quarterback	Completed 14 of 21 passes (66.7%) for 152 yards and one touchdown while rushing for a team-high 72 yards and one touchdown on 17 carries
2024	No MVP named (Note: Per July 9, 2025 email correspondence with Richmond's Associate Director of Athletics Public Relations, Christian Gravius: "[An MVP] was not named for 2024. Don't have a great answer as to why. I've considered touching base with Rob Turner from W&M and naming one retroactively. I will let you know if I do. Best, Christian.")			
2025	No MVP named (Note: An official game MVP was not designated or individually highlighted in post-game reports.)			

== See also ==
- List of NCAA college football rivalry games
- List of most-played college football series in NCAA Division I
