= 2008 Northern Colorado Bears football team =

American college football season

2008 Northern Colorado Bears football
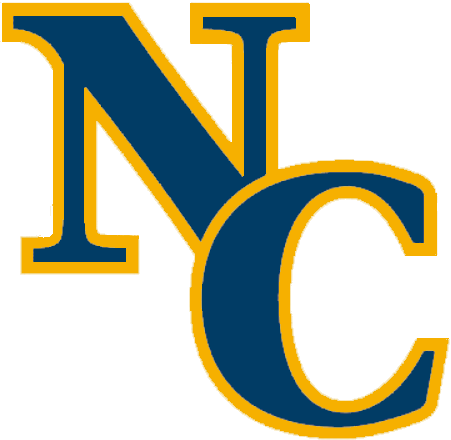
- Conference: Big Sky Conference
- Record: 1–10 (1–6 Big Sky)
- Head coach: Scott Downing (3rd season)
- Home stadium: Nottingham Field

2008 Big Sky Conference football standings
	Conf.			Overall
Team	W		L	W		L
No. 2 Montana $^	7	–	1	14	–	2
No. 7 Weber State $^	7	–	1	10	–	4
Montana State	5	–	3	7	–	5
Eastern Washington	5	–	3	6	–	5
Northern Arizona	4	–	4	6	–	5
Sacramento State	3	–	5	6	–	6
Portland State	3	–	5	4	–	7
Northern Colorado	1	–	7	1	–	10
Idaho State	1	–	7	1	–	11
$ – Conference champion; ^ – FCS playoff participant; Rankings from The Sports Network poll

The 2008 Northern Colorado Bears football team represented the University of Northern Colorado in the 2008 NCAA Division I FCS football season. The Bears were led by third-year head coach Scott Downing and played their home games at Nottingham Field. They were a member of the Big Sky Conference. They finished the season 1–10 overall and 1–6 in Big Sky play to place in eighth.

== Schedule ==
Date	Time	Opponent	Site	TV	Result	Attendance	Source
September 6	11:00 a.m.	at (FBS) Purdue*	Ross–Ade Stadium; West Lafayette, IN	BTN	L 10–42	51,476	
September 20	1:35 p.m.	Texas State*	Nottingham Field; Greeley, CO		L 35–38	7,246	
September 27		Northern Arizona	Nottingham Field; Greeley, CO		L 22–25		
October 4	6:00 p.m.	at UC Davis*	Aggie Stadium; Davis, CA		L 30–34	9,675	
October 11	1:35 p.m.	Idaho State	Nottingham Field; Greeley, CO		W 29–9	4,208	
October 18	1:50 p.m.	at No. 18 Weber State	Stewart Stadium; Ogden, UT		L 10–17	7,320	
October 25	12:50 p.m.	No. 8 Montana	Nottingham Field; Greeley, CO	KPAX	L 20–41	3,709	
November 1	12:50 p.m.	at Montana State	Bobcat Stadium; Bozeman, MT		L 7–20	12,148	
November 8	12:50 p.m.	Eastern Washington	Nottingham Field; Greeley, CO		L 16–31		
November 15	2:50 p.m.	at Sacramento State	Hornet Stadium; Sacramento, CA		L 25–45	10,567	
November 22	1:50 p.m.	at Portland State	PGE Park; Portland, OR		L 21–24	5,143	
*Non-conference game; Rankings from The Sports Network Poll released prior to the game; All times are in Mountain time
