= 1971 Furman Paladins football team =

American college football season

1971 Furman Paladins football
- Conference: Southern Conference
- Record: 5–5–1 (2–3 SoCon)
- Head coach: Bob King (14th season)
- Captains: Ron Boozer; Steve Crislip
- Home stadium: Sirrine Stadium

1971 Southern Conference football standings
	Conf.					Overall
Team	W		L		T	W		L		T
Richmond $	5	–	1	–	0	5	–	6	–	0
William & Mary	4	–	1	–	0	5	–	6	–	0
The Citadel	4	–	2	–	0	8	–	3	–	0
East Carolina	3	–	2	–	0	4	–	6	–	1
Furman	2	–	3	–	0	5	–	5	–	1
VMI	1	–	4	–	0	1	–	10	–	0
Davidson	0	–	6	–	0	1	–	9	–	0
$ – Conference champion

The 1971 Furman Paladins football team was an American football team that represented Furman University as a member of the Southern Conference (SoCon) during the 1971 NCAA University Division football season. In their 14th season under head coach Bob King, Furman compiled a 5–5–1 record, with a mark of 2–3 in conference play, placing fifth in the SoCon.

== Schedule ==
Date	Opponent	Site	Result	Attendance	Source
September 11	Appalachian State*	Sirrine Stadium; Greenville, SC	T 0–0	5,000	
September 18	at Presbyterian*	Bailey Stadium; Clinton, SC	L 14–35	5,000	
September 25	at Wofford*	Snyder Field; Spartanburg, SC (rivalry)	L 0–27	5,000	
October 2	VMI	Sirrine Stadium; Greenville, SC	W 14–0	4,000	
October 9	Western Carolina*	Sirrine Stadium; Greenville, SC	W 21–14	6,300	
October 16	Davidson	Sirrine Stadium; Greenville, SC	W 41–6	6,500	
October 23	at Richmond	City Stadium; Richmond, VA	L 0–20	5,500	
October 30	at East Carolina	Ficklen Memorial Stadium; Greenville, NC	L 13–26	13,186	
November 6	Guilford*	Sirrine Stadium; Greenville, SC	W 42–14	3,000	
November 13	at The Citadel	Johnson Hagood Stadium; Charleston, SC (rivalry)	L 33–35	19,450	
November 20	Carson–Newman*	Sirrine Stadium; Greenville, SC	W 23–10	3,000	
*Non-conference game
