= 2008 UC Davis Aggies football team =

American college football season

2008 UC Davis Aggies football
- Conference: Great West Conference
- Record: 5–7 (2–1 GWC)
- Head coach: Bob Biggs (16th season)
- Offensive coordinator: Mike Moroski (16th season)
- Home stadium: Aggie Stadium

2008 Great West Conference football standings
	Conf.			Overall
Team	W		L	W		L
No. 10 Cal Poly $^	3	–	0	8	–	3
UC Davis	2	–	1	5	–	7
North Dakota	1	–	2	6	–	4
South Dakota	1	–	2	6	–	5
Southern Utah	1	–	3	4	–	7
$ – Conference champion; ^ – FCS playoff participant; Rankings from The Sports Network poll

The 2008 UC Davis football team represented the University of California, Davis as a member of the Great West Conference (GWC) during the 2008 NCAA Division I FCS football season. Led by 16th-year head coach Bob Biggs, UC Davis compiled an overall record of 5–7 with a mark of 2–1 in conference play, placing second in the GWC. The team outscored its opponents 342 to 326 for the season. The Aggies played home games at Aggie Stadium in Davis, California.

The GWC had previously been a football-only conference, but began sports other sports in the 2008–09 school year.

== Schedule ==
Date	Opponent	Site	Result	Attendance	Source
August 30	at San Jose State*	Spartan Stadium; San Jose, CA	L 10–13	18,730	
September 6	at No. 22 Central Arkansas*	Estes Stadium; Little Rock, AR	L 21–24	10,188	
September 13	Portland State*	Aggie Stadium; Davis, CA	W 38–24	8,107	
September 20	at No. 4 Montana*	Washington–Grizzly Stadium; Missoula, MT	L 24–29	25,209	
September 27	at Northeastern*	Parsons Field; Brookline, MA	L 10–27	1,137	
October 4	Northern Colorado*	Aggie Stadium; Davis, CA	W 34–30	9,675	
October 11	Southern Utah	Aggie Stadium; Davis, CA	W 49–26	10,849	
October 18	Iona*	Aggie Stadium; Davis, CA	W 55–24	6,271	
October 25	North Dakota	Aggie Stadium; Davis, CA	W 34–21	8,876	
November 8	Sacramento State*	Aggie Stadium; Davis, CA (Causeway Classic)	L 19–29	10,317	
November 15	at No. 3 Cal Poly	Alex G. Spanos Stadium; San Luis Obispo, CA (Battle for the Golden Horseshoe)	L 28–51	11,075	
November 22	at San Diego*	Torero Stadium; San Diego, CA	L 20–28	4,503	
*Non-conference game; Rankings from The Sports Network Poll released prior to the game

== UC Davis players in the NFL ==
No UC Davis Aggies players were selected in the 2009 NFL draft. The following finished their UC Davis career in 2008, were not drafted, but played in the NFL:

Player	Position	First NFL team
Jonathan Compas	Guard	2009 Tampa Bay Buccaneers
