= 1971 VMI Keydets football team =

American college football season

1971 VMI Keydets football
- Conference: Southern Conference
- Record: 1–10 (1–4 SoCon)
- Head coach: Bob Thalman (1st season)
- Home stadium: Alumni Memorial Field

1971 Southern Conference football standings
	Conf.					Overall
Team	W		L		T	W		L		T
Richmond $	5	–	1	–	0	5	–	6	–	0
William & Mary	4	–	1	–	0	5	–	6	–	0
The Citadel	4	–	2	–	0	8	–	3	–	0
East Carolina	3	–	2	–	0	4	–	6	–	1
Furman	2	–	3	–	0	5	–	5	–	1
VMI	1	–	4	–	0	1	–	10	–	0
Davidson	0	–	6	–	0	1	–	9	–	0
$ – Conference champion

The 1971 VMI Keydets football team was an American football team that represented the Virginia Military Institute (VMI) as a member of the Southern Conference (SoCon) during the 1971 NCAA University Division football season. In their first year under head coach Bob Thalman, the team compiled an overall record of 1–10 with a mark of 1–4 in conference play, placing sixth in the SoCon. After serving as a defensive assistant under Vito Ragazzo for two years, Thalman was promoted to head coach of the Keydets in December 1970.

== Schedule ==
Date	Time	Opponent	Site	Result	Attendance	Source
September 18		Davidson	Alumni Memorial Field; Lexington, VA	W 27–3	5,500	
September 25	1:30 p.m.	at Villanova*	Villanova Stadium; Villanova, PA	L 3–13	13,324	
October 2		at Furman	Sirrine Stadium; Greenville, SC	L 0–14		
October 9		The Citadel	Alumni Memorial Field; Lexington, VA (rivalry)	L 24–25	7,500	
October 16		at Richmond	City Stadium; Richmond, VA (rivalry)	L 6–21	10,000	
October 23		at William & Mary	Cary Field; Williamsburg, VA (rivalry)	L 7–12	8,000	
October 30		at Maryland*	Byrd Stadium; College Park, MD	L 0–38	22,300	
November 6		at Southern Miss*	Faulkner Field; Hattiesburg, MS	L 0–38	12,400	
November 13		at West Virginia*	Mountaineer Field; Morgantown, WV	L 3–28	24,000	
November 20		Chattanooga*	Alumni Memorial Field; Lexington, VA	L 8–31	3,500	
November 27		vs. Virginia Tech*	Victory Stadium; Roanoke, VA (rivalry)	L 0–34	5,500	
*Non-conference game; All times are in Eastern time
