= 2008 Sacramento State Hornets football team =

American college football season

2008 Sacramento State Hornets football
- Conference: Big Sky Conference
- Record: 6–6 (3–5 Big Sky)
- Head coach: Marshall Sperbeck (2nd season)
- Home stadium: Hornet Stadium

2008 Big Sky Conference football standings
	Conf.			Overall
Team	W		L	W		L
No. 2 Montana $^	7	–	1	14	–	2
No. 7 Weber State $^	7	–	1	10	–	4
Montana State	5	–	3	7	–	5
Eastern Washington	5	–	3	6	–	5
Northern Arizona	4	–	4	6	–	5
Sacramento State	3	–	5	6	–	6
Portland State	3	–	5	4	–	7
Northern Colorado	1	–	7	1	–	10
Idaho State	1	–	7	1	–	11
$ – Conference champion; ^ – FCS playoff participant; Rankings from The Sports Network poll

The 2008 Sacramento State Hornets football team represented California State University, Sacramento as a member of the Big Sky Conference during the 2008 NCAA Division I FCS football season. Led by second-year head coach Marshall Sperbeck, Sacramento State compiled an overall record of 6–6 with a mark of 3–5 in conference play, tying for sixth place in the Big Sky. The team was outscored by its opponents 324 to 319 for the season. The Hornets played home games at Hornet Stadium in Sacramento, California.

== Schedule ==
Date	Opponent	Site	Result	Attendance	Source
August 30	Humboldt State*	Hornet Stadium; Sacramento, CA	W 45–13	10,172	
September 6	at Colorado State*	Hughes Stadium; Fort Collins, CO	L 20–23	20,051	
September 13	Southern Oregon*	Hornet Stadium; Sacramento, CA	W 27–16	6,603	
September 20	Weber State	Hornet Stadium; Sacramento, CA	L 27–32	7,186	
September 27	Portland State	Hornet Stadium; Sacramento, CA	W 41–31	8,437	
October 4	at No. 24 Northern Arizona	Walkup Skydome; Flagstaff, AZ	L 10–42	9,157	
October 18	at No. 8 Montana	Washington–Grizzly Stadium; Missoula, MT	L 7–43	25,486	
October 25	Montana State	Hornet Stadium; Sacramento, CA	L 20–31	6,138	
November 1	at Eastern Washington	Woodward Field; Cheney, WA	W 15–13	4,814	
November 8	at UC Davis*	Aggie Stadium; Davis, CA (Causeway Classic)	W 29–19	10,317	
November 15	Northern Colorado	Hornet Stadium; Sacramento, CA	W 45–25	10,567	
November 22	at Idaho State	Holt Arena; Pocatello, ID	L 33–36 ^{OT}	4,814	
*Non-conference game; Rankings from The Sports Network Poll released prior to the game
