= 2008 Northern Arizona Lumberjacks football team =

American college football season

2008 Northern Arizona Lumberjacks football
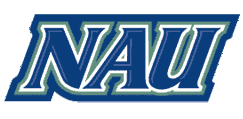
- Conference: Big Sky Conference
- Record: 6–5 (4–4 Big Sky)
- Head coach: Jerome Souers (11th season)
- Home stadium: Walkup Skydome

2008 Big Sky Conference football standings
	Conf.			Overall
Team	W		L	W		L
No. 2 Montana $^	7	–	1	14	–	2
No. 7 Weber State $^	7	–	1	10	–	4
Montana State	5	–	3	7	–	5
Eastern Washington	5	–	3	6	–	5
Northern Arizona	4	–	4	6	–	5
Sacramento State	3	–	5	6	–	6
Portland State	3	–	5	4	–	7
Northern Colorado	1	–	7	1	–	10
Idaho State	1	–	7	1	–	11
$ – Conference champion; ^ – FCS playoff participant; Rankings from The Sports Network poll

The 2008 Northern Arizona Lumberjacks football team was an American football team that represented Northern Arizona University (NAU) as a member of the Big Sky Conference (Big Sky) during the 2008 NCAA Division I FCS football season. In their eleventh year under head coach Jerome Souers, the Lumberjacks compiled a 6–5 record (4–4 against conference opponents), outscored opponents by a total of 316 to 273, and finished fifth out of nine teams in the Big Sky.

On September 6, the team set a school record with 752 yards of total offense against New Mexico Highlands.

The team played its home games at the J. Lawrence Walkup Skydome, commonly known as the Walkup Skydome, in Flagstaff, Arizona.

== Schedule ==
Date	Opponent	Rank	Site	Result	Attendance	Source
August 30	at No. 15 (FBS) Arizona State*		Sun Devil Stadium; Tempe, AZ	L 13–30	62,707	
September 6	New Mexico Highlands*		Walkup Skydome; Flagstaff, AZ	W 68–10		
September 20	at Southern Utah*		Eccles Coliseum; Cedar City, UT (rivalry)	W 19–14		
September 27	at Northern Colorado		Nottingham Field; Greeley, CO	W 25–22		
October 4	Sacramento State	No. 24	Walkup Skydome; Flagstaff, AZ	W 42–10	9,157	
October 11	Portland State	No. 18	Walkup Skydome; Flagstaff, AZ	W 37–17	5,836	
October 18	at Idaho State	No. 17	Holt Arena; Pocatello, ID	W 52–30	6,697	
October 25	No. 16 Weber State	No. 15	Walkup Skydome; Flagstaff, AZ	L 14–42	9,007	
November 1	at No. 6 Montana	No. 19	Washington–Grizzly Stadium; Missoula, MT	L 10–45	24,003	
November 8	Montana State	No. 23	Walkup Skydome; Flagstaff, AZ	L 10–45	5,777	
November 15	at Eastern Washington		Woodward Field; Cheney, WA	L 13–28	4,902	
*Non-conference game; Rankings from The Sports Network Poll released prior to the game
