= Rich Ellerson =

American football player and coach (born 1953)

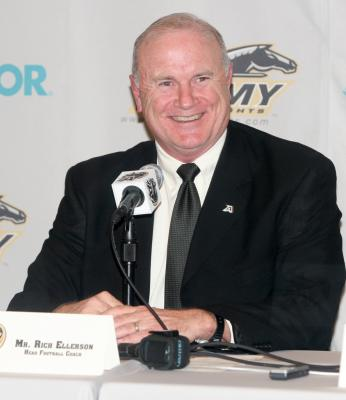
- Ellerson at his introductory press conference at Army

Biographical details
- Born: January 1, 1953 (age 73)

Playing career
- 1974–1976: Hawaii
- Positions: Center, linebacker

Coaching career (HC unless noted)
- 1977: Hawaii (GA)
- 1978: Arizona Western (DB)
- 1979: Idaho (ST)
- 1980: Cal State Fullerton (ST)
- 1981–1983: Hawaii (ST)
- 1984–1985: BC Lions (DL)
- 1986: Calgary Stampeders (DC)
- 1987–1991: Hawaii (DC)
- 1992–1995: Arizona (OLB in 1992; DL 93-95)
- 1996: Southern Utah
- 1997–2000: Arizona (DC)
- 2001–2008: Cal Poly
- 2009–2013: Army
- 2016: Jacksonville (DC)

Head coaching record
- Overall: 80–82
- Bowls: 1–0
- Tournaments: 1–2 (NCAA D-I-AA/FCS playoffs)

Accomplishments and honors

Championships
- 3 Great West Football (2004–2005, 2008)

Awards
- NCAA Division I-AA Coach of the Year (2003); AFCA Region 5 Coach of the Year (2004); Great West Conference Coach of the Year (2004)

Richard “Dick” Emmet Ellerson (born January 1, 1953) is an American former football coach. He was the head football coach at Southern Utah University in 1996, at California Polytechnic State University from 2001 to 2008, and the United States Military Academy from 2009 to 2013. While at Cal Poly, Ellerson's teams won three conference championships and compiled a 56–34 record, giving him the third highest winning percentage of any football coach in school history.

== Early life ==
Ellerson attended Salpointe Catholic High School in Tucson, Arizona. He received a congressional appointment to the United States Naval Academy, which he attended for his freshman year of 1972–73 prior to transferring following a Navy summer program in Honolulu. He subsequently attended the University of Hawaii between 1974 and 1977, when he played for the Hawaii Warriors football team as a center and linebacker.

== Coaching career ==
=== Early coaching positions ===
After graduating college in 1977, Ellerson served as a Hawaii graduate assistant under head coach Dick Tomey. From 1992 to 1995, he served at Arizona as an outside linebacker and defensive line coach, working alongside defensive coordinator Larry MacDuff. During his four-year tenure, Arizona was ranked as a top-ten team in total defense and was the number-two defense against the rush in 1992 and 1993. He also worked with special teams, and helped mentor placekicker Steve McLaughlin to a Lou Groza Award-winning season in 1994.

In 1996, Ellerson served as the head coach at Southern Utah, where he oversaw an improvement to a record of 4–7 from 2–9 the previous season. That year, Southern Utah was the leading the NCAA Division I-AA (now Division I FCS) team in rushing offense. He returned to Arizona from 1997 to 2000 as the defensive coordinator and kickers coach. In his final season there, he coached the Wildcats to become the eighth-ranked rush defense in the nation, allowing 88.5 yards per game on average. Arizona also led the Pac-10 Conference in rush defense and was second in total defense, allowing 317.5 yards per game.

=== Cal Poly ===
In 2001, Ellerson took over as the head coach at California Polytechnic State University (Cal Poly) in San Luis Obispo, California. While at Cal Poly, Ellerson led the Mustangs to a 56–34 record during his eight-year tenure. With a winning percentage of .622, he currently ranks as the third-most successful coach in school history.

During his first year, Ellerson led Cal Poly to its first winning season in four years, finishing with a 6–5 record. In 2003, Ellerson was named NCAA Division I-AA Coach of the Year. He led the Mustangs to a winning 7–4 record and a national ranking as high as 14th during the season. In 2004, he was named the Great West Football Conference Coach of the Year and AFCA Region 5 Coach of the Year. He led Cal Poly to secure the Great West championship. In 2005, Cal Poly finished with a 9–4 record and earned its first playoff berth in 15 years. They were defeated by Texas State in the quarterfinals. The Mustangs recorded a 6–0 record at home. The Mustangs narrowly missed qualifying for the 2006 playoffs. In 2007, Cal Poly achieved a 7–4 record and third place in the Great West. The Mustangs finished the season with a final ranking of 24. Under Ellerson, Cal Poly employed a triple-option offense similar to the ones traditionally used at the service academies.

His last season with the Mustangs came in 2008, during which Cal Poly reached as high as No. 3 in the FCS national rankings and hosted a home playoff game, before Ellerson finished second in voting for the annual Eddie Robinson Award.

=== Army ===
In 2008 Ellerson was speculated to be a candidate to replace Washington's head coach, Tyrone Willingham. He instead accepted an offer to become Army's head coach in December 2008. Other potential candidates for the vacant Army head coaching position included Mike Sullivan, a West Pointer and wide receivers coach for the New York Giants; Greg Gregory, South Florida offensive coordinator and former Army assistant coach; Charlie Taaffe, former Maryland offensive coordinator, Canadian Football League coach, and Army offensive coordinator; and Ed Warriner, Kansas offensive coordinator who spent 13 years as an Army assistant coach. Army also gauged the interest of both Navy's offensive and defensive coordinators, Ivin Jasper and Buddy Green, respectively.

Ellerson has several family ties to the academy. His father and two of his brothers attended West Point. His brother, John, was a captain of the Army football team while at West Point from 1960 to 1963. Rich Ellerson said, "I grew up with that special connection to Army Football. At that age, watching my big brother captain the Army football team, living on Army posts, it was just the biggest thing in our life. It was the foundation of my football experience, not just my Army football experience, and obviously, football is a big part of my life." He also said: "More than any other place in America, this is an important job. This is the United States Military Academy. We're playing football. We need to be good at this. We need to be. Everybody wants to win. We need to." He expressed a belief in the importance in working with recruits at the United States Military Academy Preparatory School (USMAPS) in order to improve the pool of candidates for the varsity team. Ellerson also referred offhandedly to Navy, in comparing the type of offensive scheme he plans on bringing to Army. "I'm a triple option guy, and our triple option looks similar to some other team that we see every once in awhile [sic], but it is not exactly alike ... What we do fits well with the Academy at every level."

In his first season at the helm, Ellerson's team finished the season with a 5–7 record. Going into the final game of the season against Navy, a win would have placed Army in the EagleBank Bowl, their first bowl berth since the 1996 Independence Bowl. They would lose to rival Navy by a score of 17–3. In his second season, Ellerson continued to turn around the Army football program. In 2010, he led Army to a 7–6 record, its first winning season since 1996, and an invitation to and victory in the 2010 Armed Forces Bowl, the program's first bowl win since 1985. The progress had Ellerson as one of the ten finalists for the 2010 Liberty Mutual Coach of the Year. The 2011 campaign for Army was not as successful as the previous two seasons. Facing a schedule with eight bowl-eligible teams and four home games, the Black Knights faltered to a 3–9 season that was plagued with injuries to key players. The fourth year under Ellerson's tenure ended with a 2–10 record; however, it did feature wins against a BCS Conference opponent in Boston College as well as Ellerson's first victory in a Commander-in-Chief's Trophy game over Air Force. After a loss to Navy in December 2013, Army administration fired Ellerson.

=== Jacksonville ===
In January 2016, Ellerson was hired as Jacksonville University’s defensive coordinator under head coach Ian Shields, who was Ellerson's offensive coordinator at Army. Ellerson was let go after his defense gave up 31 points per game and 391 yards per game (186 yards rushing per game) during the 2016 season.

== Head coaching record ==
Year	Team	Overall	Conference	Standing	Bowl/playoffs
Southern Utah Thunderbirds (NCAA Division I-AA independent) (1996)
1996	Southern Utah	4–7			
Southern Utah:		4–7			
Cal Poly Mustangs (NCAA Division I-AA independent) (2001–2003)
2001	Cal Poly	6–5			
2002	Cal Poly	3–8			
2003	Cal Poly	7–4			
Cal Poly Mustangs (Great West Football Conference) (2004–2008)
2004	Cal Poly	9–2	4–1	1st	
2005	Cal Poly	9–4	4–1	1st	L NCAA Division I-AA Quarterfinal
2006	Cal Poly	7–4	2–2	3rd	
2007	Cal Poly	7–4	2–2	3rd	
2008	Cal Poly	8–3	3–0	1st	L NCAA Division I First Round
Cal Poly:		56–34	15–6		
Army Black Knights (NCAA Division I FBS independent) (2009–2013)
2009	Army	5–7			
2010	Army	7–6			W Armed Forces
2011	Army	3–9			
2012	Army	2–10			
2013	Army	3–9			
Army:		20–41			
Total:		80–82			
National championship Conference title Conference division title or championship game berth
