= 2008 Weber State Wildcats football team =

American college football season

2008 Weber State Wildcats football
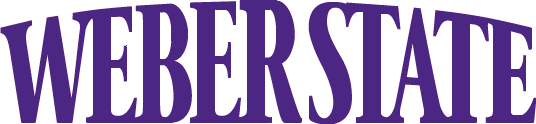

Big Sky co-champion

NCAA Division I Quarterfinal, L 13–24 vs. Montana
- Conference: Big Sky Conference

Ranking
- Sports Network: No. 7
- FCS Coaches: No. 9
- Record: 10–4 (7–1 Big Sky)
- Head coach: Ron McBride (4th season)
- Offensive coordinator: Matt Hammer (2nd season)
- Defensive coordinator: Colton Swan (1st season)
- Home stadium: Stewart Stadium

2008 Big Sky Conference football standings
	Conf.			Overall
Team	W		L	W		L
No. 2 Montana $^	7	–	1	14	–	2
No. 7 Weber State $^	7	–	1	10	–	4
Montana State	5	–	3	7	–	5
Eastern Washington	5	–	3	6	–	5
Northern Arizona	4	–	4	6	–	5
Sacramento State	3	–	5	6	–	6
Portland State	3	–	5	4	–	7
Northern Colorado	1	–	7	1	–	10
Idaho State	1	–	7	1	–	11
$ – Conference champion; ^ – FCS playoff participant; Rankings from The Sports Network poll

The 2008 Weber State Wildcats football team represented Weber State University as a member of the Big Sky Conference during the 2008 NCAA Division I FCS football season.

The 2008 season was a very successful season for the Wildcats. Led by head coach Ron McBride, the Wildcats compiled an overall record of 10–4 with a mark of 7–1 in conference play to share the Big Sky championship with Montana.

Weber State received an at-large bid to the NCAA Division I Football Championship playoffs, where they beat Cal Poly in the first round before losing to their conference rivals Montana in the quarterfinals. It was the Wildcats' first trip to the playoffs in seventeen years, and their most wins in twenty-one years.

== Schedule ==
Date	Time	Opponent	Rank	Site	TV	Result	Attendance	Source
August 28	7:00 pm	Montana Western*		Stewart Stadium; Ogden, UT		W 62–6	5,182	
September 6	10:00 pm	at Hawaii*		Aloha Stadium; Hālawa, HI		L 17–36	39,446	
September 13	6:00 pm	Dixie State*^{†}		Stewart Stadium; Ogden, UT		W 44–7	8,201	
September 20	3:00 pm	at Sacramento State		Hornet Stadium; Sacramento, CA		W 32–27	7,186	
September 27	6:00 pm	at No. 17 (FBS) Utah		Rice–Eccles Stadium; Salt Lake City, UT		L 21–37	45,117	
October 4	1:05 pm	No. 3 Montana		Stewart Stadium; Ogden, UT		W 45–28	3,753	
October 11	1:35 pm	at Montana State	No. 22	Bobcat Stadium; Bozeman, MT		W 35–12	14,447	
October 18	1:05 pm	Northern Colorado	No. 18	Stewart Stadium; Ogden, UT		W 17–10	7,320	
October 25	4:05 pm	at No. 15 Northern Arizona	No. 16	Walkup Skydome; Flagstaff, AZ		W 42–14	9,007	
November 1	1:05 pm	Portland State	No. 13	Stewart Stadium; Ogden, UT		W 31–21	8,164	
November 8	1:35 pm	at Idaho State	No. 9	Holt Arena; Pocatello, ID		W 59–27	5,514	
November 22	12:05 pm	Eastern Washington	No. 8	Stewart Stadium; Ogden, UT		L 26–33	8,841	
November 29	7:05 pm	at No. 3 Cal Poly*	No. 12	Alex G. Spanos Stadium; San Luis Obispo, CA (NCAA Division I First Round)		W 49–35	6,919	
December 6	12:00 pm	at No. 5 Montana*	No. 12	Washington–Grizzly Stadium; Missoula, MT (NCAA Division I Quarterfinal)	ESPNGP	L 13–24	21,583	
*Non-conference game; ^{†}Homecoming; Rankings from The Sports Network Poll released prior to the game; All times are in Mountain time
