= 2008 North Dakota Fighting Sioux football team =

American college football season

2008 North Dakota Fighting Sioux football
- Conference: Great West Conference
- Record: 6–4 (1–2 GWC)
- Head coach: Chris Mussman (1st season)
- Offensive coordinator: Greg Breitbach (1st season)
- Co-defensive coordinators: John Kelling (3rd season); Mike Mannausau (3rd season)
- Captains: Blair Grover; Josh Murray; Brian Troen
- Home stadium: Alerus Center

2008 Great West Conference football standings
| | Conf. | | | Overall |
| Team | W | | L | W | | L |
|---|---|---|---|---|---|---|
| No. 10 Cal Poly $^ | 3 | – | 0 | 8 | – | 3 |
| UC Davis | 2 | – | 1 | 5 | – | 7 |
| North Dakota | 1 | – | 2 | 6 | – | 4 |
| South Dakota | 1 | – | 2 | 6 | – | 5 |
| Southern Utah | 1 | – | 3 | 4 | – | 7 |
$ – Conference champion; ^ – FCS playoff participant; Rankings from The Sports Network poll

The 2008 North Dakota Fighting Sioux football team represented The University of North Dakota as a member of the Great West Conference during the 2008 NCAA Division I FCS football season. Led by first-year head coach Chris Mussman, the Fighting Sioux compiled an overall record of 6–4 with a mark of 1–2 in conference play, tying for third place in the GWC. North Dakota played home games at the Alerus Center in Grand Forks, North Dakota.

== Schedule ==
| Date | Time | Opponent | Site | TV | Result | Attendance | Source |
|---|---|---|---|---|---|---|---|
| August 28 | 7:00 pm | Texas A&M–Kingsville* | Alerus Center; Grand Forks, ND | | W 40–14 | 11,434 | |
| September 6 | 1:00 pm | St. Cloud State* | Alerus Center; Grand Forks, ND | | W 17–2 | 9,143 | |
| September 13 | 1:00 pm | Wisconsin–La Crosse* | Alerus Center; Grand Forks, ND (Potato Bowl) | | W 7–3 | 10,256 | |
| September 18 | 7:30 pm | at Idaho State* | Holt Arena; Pocatello, ID | | W 38–35 | 5,970 | |
| September 27 | 6:00 pm | at Southeastern Louisiana* | Strawberry Stadium; Hammond, LA | | L 35–38 | 5,216 | |
| October 18 | 1:00 pm | Western Washington*^{†} | Alerus Center; Grand Forks, ND | FS-North | W 42–32 | 12,164 | |
| October 25 | 8:00 pm | at UC Davis | Aggie Stadium; Davis, CA | | L 21–34 | 8,876 | |
| November 1 | 2:00 pm | at No. 11 Southern Illinois* | McAndrew Stadium; Carbondale, IL | | L 21–40 | 8,082 | |
| November 8 | 7:00 pm | Southern Utah | Alerus Center; Grand Forks, ND | | L 14–15 | 7,840 | |
| November 22 | 12:00 pm | at South Dakota | DakotaDome; Vermillion, SD | MC23 | W 34–31 ^{OT} | 7,885 | |
*Non-conference game; ^{†}Homecoming; Rankings from The Sports Network Poll released prior to the game; All times are in Central time

== Statistical leaders ==
| Passing | Att | Com | Yds | TD | Int |
|---|---|---|---|---|---|
| Danny Freund | 220 | 315 | 2407 | 23 | 7 |
| Jake Landry | 3 | 4 | 77 | 1 | 0 |

| Rushing | Att | Yds | TD |
|---|---|---|---|
| Josh Murray | 188 | 1212 | 12 |
| Brandon Brady | 56 | 233 | 3 |
| Catlin Solum | 29 | 127 | 1 |

| Receiving | Rec. | Yds | TD |
|---|---|---|---|
| Brady Trenbeath | 85 | 1001 | 10 |
| Alex Nicholas | 39 | 444 | 6 |
| Ismael Bamba | 21 | 310 | 3 |
| Josh Murray | 21 | 187 | 0 |
