= Josh Vaughan =

American football player (born 1986)

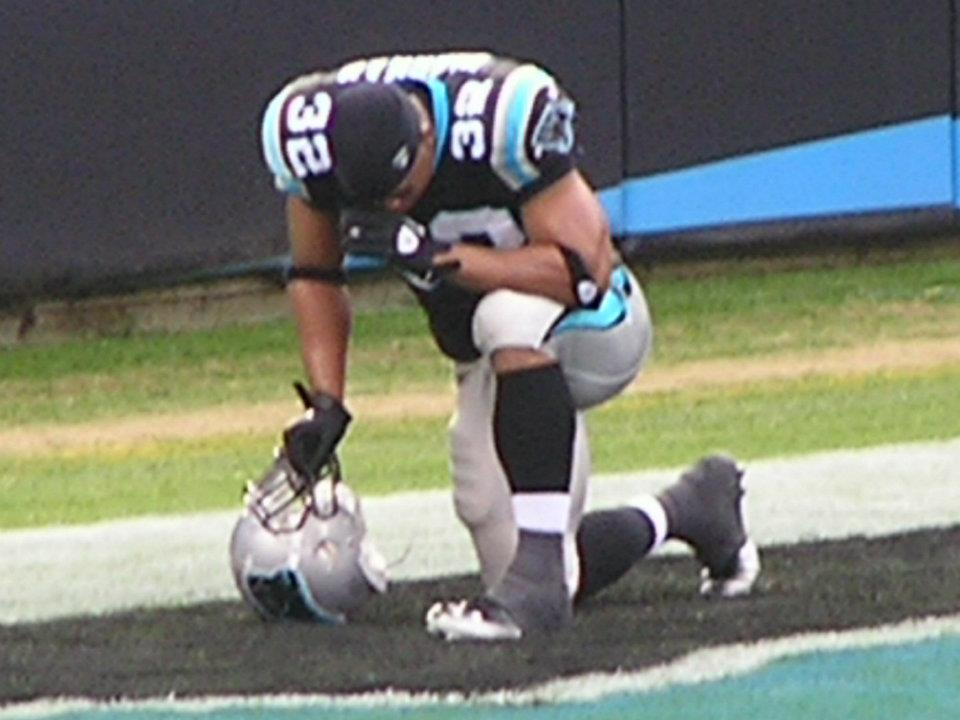
- Vaughan praying before a Panthers home game in 2011.

No. 32, 30
- Position: Running back

Personal information
- Born: December 3, 1986 (age 39); Richmond, Virginia, U.S.
- Listed height: 6 ft 0 in (1.83 m)
- Listed weight: 232 lb (105 kg)

Career information
- High school: Hermitage (VA)
- College: Richmond
- NFL draft: 2009: undrafted

Career history
- Tampa Bay Buccaneers (2009)*; Jacksonville Jaguars (2009)*; Carolina Panthers (2010)*; Indianapolis Colts (2010)*; Buffalo Bills (2010)*; Carolina Panthers (2010–2011); Atlanta Falcons (2012–2013)
- * Offseason or practice squad member only

Awards and highlights
- First-team All-CAA (2008)

Career NFL statistics
- Rushing attempts: 11
- Rushing yards: 32
- Rushing average: 2.9
- Rushing touchdowns: 1
- Stats at Pro Football Reference

Joshua Vaughan (born December 3, 1986) is an American former professional football player who was a running back in the National Football League (NFL). He played college football for the Richmond Spiders. He was signed by the Tampa Bay Buccaneers as an undrafted free agent in 2009.

Vaughan was also a member of the Jacksonville Jaguars, Carolina Panthers, Indianapolis Colts, Buffalo Bills and Atlanta Falcons.

== Early life ==
Vaughan was born in Richmond, Virginia and attended Hermitage High School. He played basketball and football as a running back and linebacker. He averaged 12 yards per carry, rushed for ten touchdowns, and had 25 catches for 312 yards and four touchdowns. As a senior in 2004, he was named a first-team All-Colonial District running back and a second-team All-Colonial District linebacker.

== College career ==
In 2005, Vaughan saw action in ten games as a true freshman. He suffered an ankle injury against James Madison, which limited his playing time. He recorded 57 carries for 203 rushing yards, caught five passes for 139 yards and a touchdown, including a 79-yard touchdown catch against Maine. He also saw action as a return specialist and returned five kickoffs for a total of 95 yards. In 2006, Vaughan played in all 11 games. He had 91 carries for 569 yards and five touchdowns which matched teammate 2007 All-American Tim Hightower's tally. He also caught 14 passes for 90 yards. In 2007, he carried 109 times for 723 yards and nine touchdowns. Vaughan filled in for leading rusher Tim Hightower after he was injured. Against Delaware, Vaughan delivered the game-winning touchdown in quintuple overtime. In 2008, he played as part of the Richmond team that would go on to win the Division I FCS National Championship. He played in all 16 games and led the team in rushing with 355 carries for 1,884 yards and 20 touchdowns. He also caught 19 passes for 67 yards. Vaughan led the team in scoring, with a total of 120 points. Vaughan was awarded first-team All-CAA honors.

== Professional career ==
=== Tampa Bay Buccaneers ===
The NFL Draft Scout ranked him as the 30th running back in a field of 149 prospects for the 2009 NFL draft. He was not selected in the draft, but was signed by the Tampa Bay Buccaneers on April 29, 2009. He was waived on August 7 when the Buccaneers claimed wide receiver Mario Urrutia off waivers.

=== Jacksonville Jaguars ===
Vaughan signed with the Jacksonville Jaguars on August 11, 2009, after the team waived/injured Drew Miller. He was waived during final cuts on September 5. The Jaguars re-signed Vaughan to their practice squad on December 21.

=== Carolina Panthers (first stint) ===
On May 1, 2010, the Carolina Panthers signed Vaughan to provide depth at the running back position, where DeAngelo Williams and Jonathan Stewart were recovering from injuries. He was waived during final cuts on September 5 and re-signed to the practice squad. Vaughan was released from the practice squad on September 23.

=== Indianapolis Colts ===
Vaughan was signed to the Indianapolis Colts' practice squad on October 18. He was cut on November 3.

=== Buffalo Bills ===
Vaughan signed to the Buffalo Bills' practice squad on November 8, 2010, but left the following day for an active roster spot with the Carolina Panthers.

=== Carolina Panthers (second stint) ===
Vaughan earned his first active roster spot when he was signed by the Carolina Panthers on November 9, 2010. On November 14, 2010, he scored his first NFL touchdown in his first NFL game against the Tampa Bay Buccaneers. On January 7, 2011, Vaughan signed a 1-year contract to stay with the Panthers through the 2011 season.

=== Atlanta Falcons ===
After he spent time on the Atlanta Falcons' active roster, the Falcons released Vaughan on August 29, 2014.

== NFL statistics ==
Year	Team	GP	GS	Rushing				
Year	Team	GP	GS	Att	Yds	Avg	Lng	TD
2010	CAR	3	0	3	7	2.3	6	1
2011	CAR	7	0	7	24	3.4	9	0
2013	ATL	6	0	1	1	1.0	1	0
Career		16	0	11	32	2.9	9	1
