= 1971 Tangerine Bowl =

American college football game

Richmond Spiders	Toledo Rockets
(5–5)	(11–0)
Southern Conference	MAC
3	28
Head coach: Frank Jones	Head coach: Jack Murphy
	AP / Coaches; 14 / 13
	1	2	3	4	Total
Richmond	3	0	0	0	3
Toledo	0	14	0	14	28
- Date: December 28, 1971
- Season: 1971
- Stadium: Tangerine Bowl
- Location: Orlando, Florida
- MVP: Chuck Ealey, Toledo (back); Mel Long, Toledo (lineman)
- Favorite: Toledo
- Attendance: 16,750

The 1971 Tangerine Bowl was held on December 28, 1971, at the Tangerine Bowl stadium in Orlando, Florida. The Toledo Rockets of the Mid-American Conference defeated the Richmond Spiders of the Southern Conference by a score of 28–3. The Tangerine Bowl is a former name of what is now called the Citrus Bowl.

Heading into the game, Toledo had an unblemished 11–0 record. They were MAC champions and were ranked #14 in the AP Poll. The Toledo Rockets were heavy favorites; they were riding a 34-game winning streak and attempting to finish their third consecutive undefeated and untied season. Their nationally ranked defense, led by All-American Mel Long, helped the Rockets outgain the Spiders 395–138 in total yards. Toledo finished #14 in the season's final AP Poll.

Richmond entered with a 5–5 record. They were Southern Conference champions after they defeated William & Mary, 21–19, in the regular season finale to clinch the conference title. The Spiders were appearing in their second-ever postseason bowl game; their first had been the 1968 Tangerine Bowl.

== Scoring summary ==
Scoring summary

Quarter	Time	Drive			Team	Scoring information	Score	
Quarter	Time	Plays	Yards	TOP	Team	Scoring information	UR	TOL
1	6:50				UR	27-yard field goal by Keith Clark	3	0
2					TOL	Fumble recovery in the end zone by Mel Long, George Keim kick good	3	7
2	9:07	7	80		TOL	Joe Schwartz 1-yard touchdown run, George Keim kick good	3	14
4					TOL	Chuck Ealey 1-yard touchdown run, George Keim kick good	3	21
4					TOL	Joe Schwartz 3-yard touchdown run, George Keim kick good	3	28
"TOP" = time of possession. For other American football terms, see Glossary of American football.							3	28
