= Kendall Gaskins =

American football player (born 1990)

No. 30
- Position: Running back

Personal information
- Born: November 4, 1990 (age 36); Burlington, New Jersey, U.S.
- Listed height: 6 ft 1 in (1.85 m)
- Listed weight: 238 lb (108 kg)

Career information
- High school: Woodberry Forest (Virginia)
- College: Richmond
- NFL draft: 2013: undrafted

Career history
- Buffalo Bills (2013)*; Tennessee Titans (2013)*; New York Giants (2013–2014)*; San Francisco 49ers (2014–2015)
- * Offseason or practice squad member only

Career NFL statistics
- Rushing attempts: 16
- Rushing yards: 38
- Receptions: 8
- Receiving yards: 69
- Stats at Pro Football Reference

Kendall Gaskins (born November 4, 1990) is an American former professional football player who was a running back in the National Football League (NFL). He played college football for the Richmond Spiders.

== Professional career ==
=== Buffalo Bills ===
On April 29, 2013, Gaskins signed with the Buffalo Bills as an undrafted free agent. Buffalo released him on August 31, 2013, prior to the start of the regular season.

=== New York Giants ===
On December 31, 2013, he was signed to a Future/Reserve contract with New York Giants.

=== San Francisco 49ers ===
On September 1, 2014, he was signed to the 49ers 10-man practice squad. He was released on September 5, 2015, in order for the 49ers to make their 53-man roster. On November 1, 2015, he was put into the game against the St. Louis Rams. He had 5 carries for 6 yards and 2 receptions for 17 yards. On June 20, 2016, he was re-signed by the 49ers. On August 27, 2016, Gaskins was released by the 49ers.
