= 2008 Montana Grizzlies football team =

American college football season

2008 Montana Grizzlies football

Big Sky co-champion

NCAA Division I Championship Game, L 7–24 vs. Richmond
- Conference: Big Sky Conference

Ranking
- Sports Network: No. 2
- Record: 14–2 (7–1 Big Sky)
- Head coach: Bobby Hauck (6th season)
- Offensive coordinator: Rob Phenicie (6th season)
- Defensive coordinator: Kraig Paulson (5th season)
- Home stadium: Washington–Grizzly Stadium

2008 Big Sky Conference football standings
	Conf.			Overall
Team	W		L	W		L
No. 2 Montana $^	7	–	1	14	–	2
No. 7 Weber State $^	7	–	1	10	–	4
Montana State	5	–	3	7	–	5
Eastern Washington	5	–	3	6	–	5
Northern Arizona	4	–	4	6	–	5
Sacramento State	3	–	5	6	–	6
Portland State	3	–	5	4	–	7
Northern Colorado	1	–	7	1	–	10
Idaho State	1	–	7	1	–	11
$ – Conference champion; ^ – FCS playoff participant; Rankings from The Sports Network poll

The 2008 Montana Grizzlies football team represented the University of Montana as a member of the Big Sky Conference during the 2007 NCAA Division I FCS football season. Led by sixth-year head coach Bobby Hauck, the Grizzlies compiled an overall record of 14–2 with a mark of 7–1 in conference play, sharing the Big Sky title with Weber State. Montana advanced to the NCAA Division I-AA Football Championship playoffs, where the Grizzlies defeated Texas State in the first round, Weber State in the quarterfinals, and James Madison in the semifinals before losing to Richmond in the NCAA Division I Championship Game. The team played home games at Washington–Grizzly Stadium in Missoula, Montana.

== Schedule ==
Date	Time	Opponent	Rank	Site	TV	Result	Attendance	Source
September 6	7:00 pm	at No. 11 Cal Poly*	No. 5	Alex G. Spanos Stadium; San Luis Obispo, CA	KPAX	W 30–28	10,035	
September 13	1:00 pm	Southern Utah*	No. 4	Washington–Grizzly Stadium; Missoula, MT	KPAX	W 46–10	25,056	
September 20	1:00 pm	UC Davis*^{†}	No. 4	Washington–Grizzly Stadium; Missoula, MT	KPAX	W 29–24	25,209	
September 27	1:00 pm	Central Washington*	No. 3	Washington–Grizzly Stadium; Missoula, MT	KPAX	W 38–35	25,326	
October 4	1:00 pm	at Weber State	No. 2	Stewart Stadium; Ogden, UT	KPAX	L 28–45	3,753	
October 11	3:00 pm	at No. 23 Eastern Washington	No. 12	Woodward Field; Cheney, WA (EWU–UM Governors Cup)	KPAX	W 19–3	10,830	
October 18	1:00 pm	Sacramento State	No. 8	Washington–Grizzly Stadium; Missoula, MT	KPAX	W 43–7	25,486	
October 25	12:00 pm	at Northern Colorado	No. 8	Nottingham Field; Greeley, CO	KPAX	W 41–20	3,709	
November 1	12:00 pm	No. 19 Northern Arizona	No. 6	Washington–Grizzly Stadium; Missoula, MT	KPAX	W 45–10	24,003	
November 8	2:00 pm	at Portland State	No. 5	PGE Park; Portland, OR	KPAX	W 29–12	12,071	
November 15	12:00 pm	Idaho State	No. 5	Washington–Grizzly Stadium; Missoula, MT	KPAX	W 29–10	23,527	
November 22	12:00 pm	Montana State	No. 5	Washington–Grizzly Stadium; Missoula, MT (rivalry)	KPAX	W 35–3	25,629	
November 29	12:00 pm	No. 23 Texas State*	No. 5	Washington–Grizzly Stadium; Missoula, MT (NCAA Division I First Round)	KPAX	W 31–13	19,489	
December 6	12:00 pm	No. 10 Weber State*	No. 5	Washington–Grizzly Stadium; Missoula, MT (NCAA Division I Quarterfinal)	ESPNGP	W 24–13	21,583	
December 12	6:00 pm	at No. 1 James Madison*	No. 5	Bridgeforth Stadium; Harrisonburg, VA (NCAA Division I Semifinal)	ESPN2	W 35–27	15,976	
December 19	6:00 pm	vs. No. 7 Richmond*	No. 5	Finley Stadium; Chattanooga, TN (NCAA Division I Championship)	ESPN2	L 7–24	17,823	
*Non-conference game; ^{†}Homecoming; Rankings from The Sports Network Poll released prior to the game; All times are in Mountain time
