= Frank Jones (American football coach) =

American football coach and administrator (1918–2009)

Biographical details
- Born: August 30, 1918; Tifton, Georgia, U.S.
- Died: July 25, 2009 (aged 90); Richmond, Virginia, U.S.

Playing career
- ?: Middle Georgia

Coaching career (HC unless noted)
- c. 1950: Cordele HS (GA)
- 1951–1956: Decatur HS (GA)
- 1957–1961: Presbyterian
- 1962–1965: Mississippi State (assistant)
- 1966–1973: Richmond

Administrative career (AD unless noted)
- 1958–1961: Presbyterian
- 1967–1974: Richmond

Head coaching record
- Overall: 68–60–3 (college)
- Bowls: 1–2

Accomplishments and honors

Championships
- 3 South Carolina Little Three (1958–1960); 3 SoCon (1968–1969, 1971)

Benjamin Franklin Jones Jr. (August 30, 1918 – July 25, 2009) was an American football coach and college athletics administrator. He served as the head coach at Presbyterian College from 1957 to 1961 and at the University of Richmond from 1966 to 1973, compiling a career college football record of 68–60–3.

== Death ==
Jones died in July 2009, at age 90 in Richmond, after suffering a stroke. A memorial service was held for him at the River Road Presbyterian church. He was survived by his wife Jean whom he was married to for 56 years, and his five children and 11 grandchildren.

== Head coaching record ==
=== College ===
Year	Team	Overall	Conference	Standing	Bowl/playoffs
Presbyterian Blue Hose (South Carolina Little Three) (1957–1961)
1957	Presbyterian	0–8–1	0–2	3rd	
1958	Presbyterian	6–3–1	2–0	1st	
1959	Presbyterian	9–2	2–0	1st	L Tangerine
1960	Presbyterian	6–3	2–0	1st	
1961	Presbyterian	3–6–1	0–1–1	T–2nd	
Presbyterian:		24–22–3	6–3–1		
Richmond Spiders (Southern Conference) (1966–1973)
1966	Richmond	2–8	2–4	7th	
1967	Richmond	5–5	5–2	3rd	
1968	Richmond	8–3	6–0	1st	W Tangerine
1969	Richmond	6–4	5–1	T–1st	
1970	Richmond	4–6	3–3	T–4th	
1971	Richmond	5–6	5–1	1st	L Tangerine
1972	Richmond	6–4	5–1	2nd	
1973	Richmond	8–2	5–1	2nd	
Richmond:		44–38	36–13		
Total:		68–60–3			
National championship Conference title Conference division title or championship game berth
