= 1968 Tangerine Bowl =

American college football game

Richmond Spiders	Ohio Bobcats
(7–3)	(10–0)
Southern Conference	MAC
49	42
Head coach: Frank Jones	Head coach: Bill Hess
	AP / Coaches; 15 / 18
	1	2	3	4	Total
Richmond	7	21	14	7	49
Ohio	7	14	13	8	42
- Date: December 27, 1968
- Season: 1968
- Stadium: Tangerine Bowl
- Location: Orlando, Florida
- MVP: Buster O'Brien, Richmond (back); Walker Gillette, Richmond (lineman)
- Favorite: Ohio
- Attendance: 16,114

The 1968 Tangerine Bowl was held on December 27, 1968, at the Tangerine Bowl stadium in Orlando, Florida. The Richmond Spiders of the Southern Conference defeated the Ohio Bobcats of the Mid-American Conference by a score of 49–42. The Tangerine Bowl is the former name of what is now called the Citrus Bowl.

Heading into the game, Ohio University finished their regular season slate with a perfect 10–0–0 record. The Bobcats also held a #15 Associated Press (AP) national ranking. The 1968 Ohio Bobcats football team had one of the most potent offenses the nation and was spearheaded by quarterback Cleve Bryant. Ohio was one of only three NCAA programs to finish their regular season with an unbeaten and untied record.

The University of Richmond entered with an 8–3–0 record. They were Southern Conference champions after having finished 6–0–0 in conference play. They were decided underdogs against Ohio and the national media did not give them much of a chance to compete, let alone win the game. The upset-minded Spiders did just that, however, winning their first-ever postseason bowl game 49–42. It would ultimately be Richmond's only bowl victory (they lost in their only other bowl appearance, the 1971 Tangerine Bowl).

After the loss, the Bobcats finished #20 in the final AP Poll.

Scoring summary

Quarter	Time	Drive			Team	Scoring information	Score	
Quarter	Time	Plays	Yards	TOP	Team	Scoring information	UR	OU
1	10:51				OU	Todd Snyder 49-yard touchdown reception from Cleve Bryant, William Pataki kick good	0	7
1	2:51				UR	Jim Livesay 24-yard touchdown reception from Buster O'Brien, Mike Dussault kick good	7	7
2	12:59				UR	Buster O'Brien 31-yard touchdown run, Mike Dussault kick good	14	7
2	10:37				OU	Cleve Bryant 7-yard touchdown run, William Pataki kick good	14	14
2	8:39				UR	Joe Kellum 1-yard touchdown run, Mike Dussault kick good	21	14
2	4:50				UR	Walker Gillette 5-yard touchdown reception from Buster O'Brien, Mike Dussault kick good	28	14
2	0:33				OU	Todd Snyder 3-yard touchdown reception from Cleve Bryant, William Pataki kick good	28	21
3	10:22				OU	Todd Snyder 45-yard touchdown reception from Cleve Bryant, William Pataki kick good	28	28
3	4:06				UR	Joe Kellum 4-yard touchdown run, Mike Dussault kick good	35	28
3	1:30				UR	Jim Crenshaw 12-yard touchdown reception from Buster O'Brien, Mike Dussault kick good	42	28
3					OU	Dave LeVeck 2-yard touchdown run, 2-point run failed	42	34
4	5:29				UR	Jim Livesay 15-yard touchdown reception from Buster O'Brien, Mike Dussault kick good	49	34
4	1:33				OU	Bob Houmard 3-yard touchdown reception from Cleve Bryant, 2-point run good	49	42
"TOP" = time of possession. For other American football terms, see Glossary of American football.							49	42

== Post-game quotes ==
"It is the biggest thing I have ever been associated with. I know it is the biggest athletic victory for the University of Richmond." –Frank Jones, Richmond head coach
"I've played football a long time, but this is the greatest. It's been something we've been working for since spring practice." –Buster O'Brien, Richmond quarterback
