= Eric Ward (quarterback) =

American gridiron football player (born 1987)

No. 11, 13
- Position: Quarterback

Personal information
- Born: April 12, 1987 (age 39); Atlanta, Georgia, U.S.
- Listed height: 6 ft 2 in (1.88 m)
- Listed weight: 220 lb (100 kg)

Career information
- High school: Decatur (GA) Southwest DeKalb
- College: Richmond
- NFL draft: 2010: undrafted

Career history
- Milwaukee Mustangs (2011); Edmonton Eskimos (2011)

Career CFL statistics
- Comp. / Att.: 1 / 1
- Passing yards: 1
- TD–INT: 0–0
- QB rating: 89.6
- Rushing yards: 15
- Stats at CFL.ca (archived)

Career AFL statistics
- Comp. / Att.: 53 / 94
- Passing yards: 608
- TD–INT: 8–3
- QB rating: 84.00
- Rushing TD: 5
- Stats at ArenaFan.com

Eric Ward (born April 12, 1987) is an American former professional football quarterback He played for the Edmonton Eskimos of the Canadian Football League. He was released by the Eskimos on June 2, 2012. He played college football for the Richmond Spiders. He was part of the Richmond Spiders teams that captured two CAA Football crowns in 2007 & 2009 and the NCAA Division I FCS championship in 2008. He finished with a four year college record of 41–12.
