= Mike Stock (American football) =

American football player and coach (born 1939)

Biographical details
- Born: September 29, 1939 (age 87); Barberton, Ohio, U.S.

Playing career

Football
- 1958–1960: Northwestern

Baseball
- c. 1960: Northwestern
- Positions: Fullback (football); Catcher (baseball)

Coaching career (HC unless noted)

Football
- 1961: Northwestern (freshmen)
- c. 1965: South HS (OH) (assistant)
- 1966–1967: Buffalo (assistant)
- 1968: Navy (RB/WR)
- 1969–1974: Notre Dame (freshman/WR)
- 1975–1977: Wisconsin (OC/RB)
- 1978–1982: Eastern Michigan
- 1983: New Jersey Generals (off. backs)
- 1983–1986: Notre Dame (RB/WR)
- 1987–1991: Cincinnati Bengals (ST/WR/TE)
- 1992–1994: Ohio State (WR)
- 1995–2000: Kansas City Chiefs (ST)
- 2001–2003: Washington Redskins (ST)
- 2004: St. Louis Rams (ST)
- 2006–2008: Green Bay Packers (ST)

Head coaching record
- Overall: 6–38–1

Accomplishments and honors

Championships
- 1 UFL (2011)

Awards
- Third-team All-American (1960); First-team All-Big Ten (1959)

Michael J. Stock (born September 29, 1939) is an American former football player and coach. He coached for 26 years at the collegiate level, 17 years in the National Football League (NFL), one year in the United States Football League (USFL), and one year coaching high school football in Ohio; altogether he coached 14 different teams. His career included four and a half seasons, from 1978 to 1982, as the head football coach at Eastern Michigan University, where he coached the Eastern Michigan Hurons through most of a school-record 27-game losing streak.

== College athlete ==
Stock played fullback at Northwestern University under coach Ara Parseghian. From 1959 to 1960 he led the Northwestern Wildcats in rushing. Stock won Kodak and UPI All American honors in 1960, as well as All-Big Ten Conference honors in 1959 and 1960. He was co-captain of Northwestern's 1959 and 1960 football teams. Stock also played catcher for Northwestern's baseball team and earned All-Big Ten honors in 1959.

== College assistant ==
Following his graduation, Stock served as freshman coach at Northwestern in 1961 before serving in the United States Army. After leaving the army, he worked for one year as an assistant coach at South High School in Akron, Ohio. In 1966 and 1967 he coached the freshman team at the University at Buffalo, before working as wide receivers and running backs coach at the United States Naval Academy the following year.

From 1969 through 1974, Stock rejoined Ara Parseghian at Notre Dame, first as freshman coach and subsequently as wide receivers coach. During his time there the team won the 1971 Cotton Bowl Classic against Texas, and went undefeated to win a national championship in 1973, and the team posted a record of 55–10–1. From 1975 through 1977 he coached under John Jardine at Wisconsin, first as running backs coach, and then as offensive coordinator.

== Eastern Michigan ==
Stock's tenure as head coach of the Eastern Michigan Eagles football team is primarily remembered for his role in a school-record 27-game losing streak from 1980 through 1982, including a winless season in 1981. He was fired after the team lost the first three games of 1982, including a 49–12 pasting at Louisiana Tech and 35–0 shutout at Miami, bringing the losing streak to 22 games; the team went on to lose five more consecutive games under interim coach Bob LaPointe before the streak was broken with a 9–7 win over Kent State on November 6, 1982. Stock's teams were held scoreless seven times, only won three Mid-American Conference games, were outscored by a total of 809 points — nearly 18 points per game, and his final record of 6–38–1 gives him a .144 winning percentage, easily the lowest of any coach to remain at Eastern more than one season.

== Assistant coach ==
After leaving Eastern Michigan, Stock returned to working as an assistant coach. In 1983, he coached offensive backfield for the New Jersey Generals of the United States Football League (USFL), mentoring running back Herschel Walker. He then returned to Notre Dame, where he coached wide receivers and running backs through 1986. From 1987 through 1991 he coached special teams, then wide receivers, and finally tight ends for the Cincinnati Bengals of the National Football League (NFL. From 1992 through 1994 he coached wide receivers at Ohio State University. He then returned to the NFL, where from 1995 through 2000, he was the special teams coach for the Kansas City Chiefs. From 2001 to 2003 he was the Washington Redskins' special teams coach. In 2004, he was the special teams coach for the St. Louis Rams. For the 2006 through 2008 seasons, including the 2009 playoff run, he was special teams coordinator for the Green Bay Packers.

== Head coaching record ==
Year	Team	Overall	Conference	Standing	Bowl/playoffs
Eastern Michigan Hurons (Mid-American Conference) (1978–1982)
1978	Eastern Michigan	3–7	1–5	10th	
1979	Eastern Michigan	2–8–1	1–6–1	9th	
1980	Eastern Michigan	1–9	1–7	10th	
1981	Eastern Michigan	0–11	0–9	10th	
1982	Eastern Michigan	0–3	0–1		
Eastern Michigan:		6–38–1	3–28–1		
Total:		6–38–1			
