= 1981 Youngstown State Penguins football team =

American college football season

1981 Youngstown State Penguins football
- Conference: Ohio Valley Conference
- Record: 7–4 (5–3 OVC)
- Head coach: Bill Narduzzi (7th season)
- Captains: Jeff Gergel; Brett Modic
- Home stadium: Rayen Stadium

1981 Ohio Valley Conference football standings
| | Conf. | | | | | Overall |
| Team | W | | L | | T | W | | L | | T |
|---|---|---|---|---|---|---|---|---|---|---|
| No. 1 Eastern Kentucky $^ | 8 | – | 0 | – | 0 | 12 | – | 2 | – | 0 |
| No. 9 Murray State | 5 | – | 3 | – | 0 | 8 | – | 3 | – | 0 |
| Youngstown State | 5 | – | 3 | – | 0 | 7 | – | 4 | – | 0 |
| Tennessee Tech | 4 | – | 4 | – | 0 | 6 | – | 5 | – | 0 |
| Middle Tennessee | 4 | – | 4 | – | 0 | 6 | – | 5 | – | 0 |
| Western Kentucky | 4 | – | 4 | – | 0 | 6 | – | 5 | – | 0 |
| Akron | 4 | – | 4 | – | 0 | 5 | – | 5 | – | 0 |
| Austin Peay | 3 | – | 5 | – | 0 | 5 | – | 5 | – | 0 |
| Morehead State | 0 | – | 8 | – | 0 | 1 | – | 9 | – | 0 |
$ – Conference champion; ^ – NCAA Division I-AA playoff participant; Rankings from NCAA Division I-AA Football Committee poll

The 1981 Youngstown State Penguins football team represented Youngstown State University during the 1981 NCAA Division I-AA football season. Led by seventh-year head coach Bill Narduzzi, the Penguins compiled an overall record of 7–4 with a mark of 3–3 on conference play, and finished tied for second in the OVC.

== Schedule ==
| Date | Opponent | Site | Result | Attendance | Source |
|---|---|---|---|---|---|
| September 5 | at Cincinnati* | Nippert Stadium; Cincinnati, OH | W 16–13 | 8,304 | |
| September 12 | Eastern Kentucky | Rayen Stadium; Youngstown, OH | L 6–26 | | |
| September 19 | Murray State | Rayen Stadium; Youngstown, OH | L 9–13 | | |
| October 3 | at Akron | Rubber Bowl; Akron, OH (rivalry) | W 34–7 | | |
| October 10 | Western Kentucky^{†} | Rayen Stadium; Youngstown, OH | L 14–35 | 4,029 | |
| October 17 | at No. T–6 Delaware* | Delaware Stadium; Newark, DE | W 24–21 | 18,645 | |
| October 24 | Eastern Illinois* | Rayen Stadium; Youngstown, OH | W 48–16 | | |
| October 31 | at Middle Tennessee | Johnny "Red" Floyd Stadium; Murfreesboro, TN | W 13–10 | 10,000 | |
| November 7 | Western Illinois* | Rayen Stadium; Youngstown, OH | W 34–22 | | |
| November 14 | at Morehead State | Jayne Stadium; Morehead, KY | W 38–7 | | |
| November 21 | at Northern Iowa* | UNI-Dome; Cedar Falls, IA | L 43–45 | | |
*Non-conference game; ^{†}Homecoming; Rankings from NCAA Division I-AA Football Committee Poll released prior to the game
