= 1982 Youngstown State Penguins football team =

American college football season

1982 Youngstown State Penguins football
- Conference: Ohio Valley Conference
- Record: 6–5 (4–3 OVC)
- Head coach: Bill Narduzzi (8th season)
- Home stadium: Stambaugh Stadium

1982 Ohio Valley Conference football standings
	Conf.					Overall
Team	W		L		T	W		L		T
No. 1 Eastern Kentucky $^	7	–	0	–	0	13	–	0	–	0
Akron	5	–	2	–	0	6	–	5	–	0
Middle Tennessee	4	–	3	–	0	8	–	3	–	0
Youngstown State	4	–	3	–	0	6	–	5	–	0
Morehead State	2	–	5	–	0	5	–	6	–	0
Murray State	2	–	5	–	0	4	–	7	–	0
Austin Peay	2	–	5	–	0	3	–	7	–	0
Tennessee Tech	1	–	6	–	0	3	–	8	–	0
$ – Conference champion; ^ – NCAA Division I-AA playoff participant; Rankings from NCAA Division I-AA Football Committee poll

The 1982 Youngstown State Penguins football team represented Youngstown State University during the 1982 NCAA Division I-AA football season. Led by eighth-year head coach Bill Narduzzi, the Penguins compiled an overall record of 6–5 with a mark of 4–3 on conference play, and finished tied for third in the OVC.

== Schedule ==
Date	Time	Opponent	Site	Result	Attendance	Source
September 4		Akron	Stambaugh Stadium; Youngstown, OH (rivalry)	L 19–20	15,833	
September 11		at Eastern Kentucky	Hanger Field; Richmond, KY	L 17–31	14,600	
September 18		Tennessee Tech	Stambaugh Stadium; Youngstown, OH	W 37–14	8,441	
September 25	7:35 p.m.	at Cincinnati*	Nippert Stadium; Cincinnati, OH	L 3–57	22,750	
October 2		Eastern Illinois*	Stambaugh Stadium; Youngstown, OH	L 23–27	8,895	
October 9		at Western Kentucky*	L. T. Smith Stadium; Bowling Green, KY	L 14–28	12,500	
October 16		at Austin Peay	Municipal Stadium; Clarksville, TN	W 31–9	4,500	
October 30		Middle Tennessee	Stambaugh Stadium; Youngstown, OH	W 11–10	7,014	
November 6		at Western Illinois*	Hanson Field; Macomb, IL	W 28–20	5,849	
November 13		at Morehead State	Jayne Stadium; Morehead, KY	W 38–19	1,500	
November 20		Northern Iowa*	Stambaugh Stadium; Youngstown, OH	W 25–13	3,912	
*Non-conference game
