= 1981 Akron Zips football team =

American college football season

1981 Akron Zips football
- Conference: Ohio Valley Conference
- Record: 5–5 (4–4 OVC)
- Head coach: Jim Dennison (9th season)
- Captain: Don Schutz; Dennis Brumfield; Brad Reese
- Home stadium: Rubber Bowl

1981 Ohio Valley Conference football standings
	Conf.					Overall
Team	W		L		T	W		L		T
No. 1 Eastern Kentucky $^	8	–	0	–	0	12	–	2	–	0
No. 9 Murray State	5	–	3	–	0	8	–	3	–	0
Youngstown State	5	–	3	–	0	7	–	4	–	0
Tennessee Tech	4	–	4	–	0	6	–	5	–	0
Middle Tennessee	4	–	4	–	0	6	–	5	–	0
Western Kentucky	4	–	4	–	0	6	–	5	–	0
Akron	4	–	4	–	0	5	–	5	–	0
Austin Peay	3	–	5	–	0	5	–	5	–	0
Morehead State	0	–	8	–	0	1	–	9	–	0
$ – Conference champion; ^ – NCAA Division I-AA playoff participant; Rankings from NCAA Division I-AA Football Committee poll

The 1981 Akron Zips football team represented Akron University in the 1981 NCAA Division I-AA football season as a member of the Ohio Valley Conference. Led by ninth-year head coach Jim Dennison, the Zips played their home games at the Rubber Bowl in Akron, Ohio. They finished the season with a record of 5–5 overall and 4–4 in OVC play to tie for fourth place.

== Schedule ==
Date	Opponent	Site	Result	Attendance	Source
September 5	Middle Tennessee	Rubber Bowl; Akron, OH	L 7–10	31,004	
September 12	at Eastern Michigan*	Rynearson Stadium; Ypsilanti, MI	W 14–7	9,200	
September 19	at Kent State*	Dix Stadium; Kent, OH (Wagon Wheel)	L 6–17	13,169	
September 26	at No. 5 Eastern Kentucky	Hanger Field; Richmond, KY	L 0–37	15,800	
October 3	Youngstown State	Rubber Bowl; Akron, OH (Steel Tire)	L 7–34		
October 10	at Tennessee Tech	Tucker Stadium; Cookeville, TN	W 10–7	8,345	
October 17	Morehead State	Rubber Bowl; Akron, OH	W 31–14		
October 24	No. 4 Murray State	Rubber Bowl; Akron, OH	W 20–19		
October 31	at Austin Peay	Clarksville Municipal Stadium; Clarksville, TN	W 23–19	4,750	
November 7	Western Kentucky	Rubber Bowl; Akron, OH	L 14–19	6,002	
*Non-conference game; Rankings from NCAA Division I-AA Football Committee Poll released prior to the game
