= 1982 Akron Zips football team =

American college football season

1982 Akron Zips football
- Conference: Ohio Valley Conference
- Record: 6–5 (5–2 OVC)
- Head coach: Jim Dennison (10th season)
- Captain: Rick Addis; Frank Mazgaj; Fred Robertson; Tim Staycer
- Home stadium: Rubber Bowl

1982 Ohio Valley Conference football standings
	Conf.					Overall
Team	W		L		T	W		L		T
No. 1 Eastern Kentucky $^	7	–	0	–	0	13	–	0	–	0
Akron	5	–	2	–	0	6	–	5	–	0
Middle Tennessee	4	–	3	–	0	8	–	3	–	0
Youngstown State	4	–	3	–	0	6	–	5	–	0
Morehead State	2	–	5	–	0	5	–	6	–	0
Murray State	2	–	5	–	0	4	–	7	–	0
Austin Peay	2	–	5	–	0	3	–	7	–	0
Tennessee Tech	1	–	6	–	0	3	–	8	–	0
$ – Conference champion; ^ – NCAA Division I-AA playoff participant; Rankings from NCAA Division I-AA Football Committee poll

The 1982 Akron Zips football team represented Akron University in the 1982 NCAA Division I-AA football season as a member of the Ohio Valley Conference. Led by 10th-year head coach Jim Dennison, the Zips played their home games at the Rubber Bowl in Akron, Ohio. They finished the season with a record of 6–5 overall and 5–2 in OVC play to tie for second place.

== Schedule ==
Date	Time	Opponent	Site	Result	Attendance	Source
September 4		at Youngstown State	Stambaugh Stadium; Youngstown, OH (Steel Tire)	W 20–19	15,833	
September 11		Eastern Michigan*	Rubber Bowl; Akron, OH	W 14–7	35,684	
September 18		at Western Kentucky*	L. T. Smith Stadium; Bowling Green, KY	L 3–10	8,500	
September 25		No. 2 Eastern Kentucky	Rubber Bowl; Akron, OH	L 10–19	9,286	
October 2		at Middle Tennessee	Johnny "Red" Floyd Stadium; Murfreesboro, TN	W 19–16	7,500	
October 9		at Eastern Illinois*	O'Brien Field; Charleston, IL	L 0–18	10,631	
October 16		Morehead State	Rubber Bowl; Akron, OH	W 28–6	8,682	
October 23	1:30 p.m.	at Marshall*	Fairfield Stadium; Huntington, WV	L 10–12	11,714	
October 30		Tennessee Tech	Rubber Bowl; Akron, OH	W 28–12	7,126	
November 13		at Murray State	Roy Stewart Stadium; Murray, KY	L 14–16	3,500	
November 20		Austin Peay	Rubber Bowl; Akron, OH	W 42–7	3,186	
*Non-conference game; Rankings from NCAA Division I-AA Football Committee Poll released prior to the game; All times are in Eastern time
