= 1982 Illinois State Redbirds football team =

American college football season

1982 Illinois State Redbirds football
- Conference: Missouri Valley Conference
- Record: 2–9 (0–5 MVC)
- Head coach: Bob Otolski (2nd season)
- Home stadium: Hancock Stadium

1982 Missouri Valley Conference football standings
	Conf.					Overall
Team	W		L		T	W		L		T
Tulsa $	6	–	0	–	0	10	–	1	–	0
Wichita State	4	–	1	–	0	8	–	3	–	0
Southern Illinois	4	–	1	–	0	6	–	5	–	0
Indiana State	3	–	2	–	0	5	–	6	–	0
Drake	2	–	4	–	0	4	–	7	–	0
New Mexico State	1	–	4	–	0	3	–	8	–	0
West Texas State	1	–	4	–	0	3	–	8	–	0
Illinois State	0	–	5	–	0	2	–	9	–	0
$ – Conference champion; The conference was a hybrid of NCAA Division I-A and I-AA programs. New Mexico State, Tulsa, and Wichita State were I-A and the other teams were I-AA.

The 1982 Illinois State Redbirds football team was an American football team that represented Illinois State University as a member of the Missouri Valley Conference (MVC) during the 1982 NCAA Division I-AA football season. In their second year under head coach Bob Otolski, the Redbirds compiled an overall record of 2–9 with a mark of 0–5 in conference play, placing last out of eight teams in the MVC. Illinois State played home games at Hancock Stadium in Normal, Illinois.

== Schedule ==
Date	Time	Opponent	Site	Result	Attendance	Source
September 4		at Eastern Illinois*	O'Brien Stadium; Charleston, IL (rivalry)	L 14–27	8,200	
September 11		at Southern Illinois	Hancock Stadium; Normal, IL	L 0–16	12,289	
September 18		at Western Illinois*	Hanson Field; Macomb, IL	L 13–29	9,231	
September 25		Wayne State (MI)*	Hancock Stadium; Normal, IL	W 25–0	11,023	
October 2		at New Mexico State	Aggie Memorial Stadium; Las Cruces, NM	L 17–26	13,571	
October 9	1:30 p.m.	Wichita State	Hancock Stadium; Normal, IL	L 14–48	11,061	
October 23		at East Carolina*	Ficklen Memorial Stadium; Greenville, NC	L 0–21	26,771	
October 30		at Indiana State	Memorial Stadium; Terre Haute, IN	L 7–24	6,244	
November 6		Morehead State*	Hancock Stadium; Normal, IL	W 31–28	5,518	
November 13		Drake	Hancock Stadium; Normal, IL	L 35–42	2,687	
November 20		at Ball State*	Ball State Stadium; Muncie, IN	L 17–52	4,200	
*Non-conference game; All times are in Central time
