= 1982 Northern Iowa Panthers football team =

American college football season

1982 Northern Iowa Panthers football

Mid-Con co-champion
- Conference: Association of Mid-Continent Universities
- Record: 4–6–1 (2–0–1 Mid-Con)
- Head coach: Stan Sheriff (23th season)
- Offensive coordinator: John Gregory (1st season)
- Defensive coordinator: Dennis Remmert (12th season)
- Home stadium: UNI-Dome

1982 Association of Mid-Continent Universities football standings
	Conf.					Overall
Team	W		L		T	W		L		T
No. 5 Eastern Illinois +^	2	–	0	–	1	11	–	1	–	1
Northern Iowa +	2	–	0	–	1	4	–	6	–	1
Southwest Missouri State	1	–	2	–	0	5	–	6	–	0
Western Illinois	0	–	3	–	0	2	–	8	–	0
+ – Conference co-champions; ^ – NCAA Division I-AA playoff participant; Rankings from NCAA Division I-AA Football Committee poll

The 1982 Northern Iowa Panthers football team was an American football team that represented the University of Northern Iowa as a member of the Association of Mid-Continent Universities (Mid-Con) during the 1982 NCAA Division I-AA football season. In its 23rd and final season under head coach Stan Sheriff, the team compiled a 4–6–1 record (2–0–1 in conference games) and tied for the Mid-Con championship. On November 19, 1982, the Friday before the final game of the season, Sheriff resigned as head coach but kept his positions as athletic director and full-time manager of the UNI-Dome.

Five Northern Iowa players were honored as first-team players on the all-Mid-Con team: offensive lineman Steve Ingalls; kicker Steve Schonert; return specialist Craig Nordlie; nose guard Mark Salz; and defensive back John Root. Five others, including linebacker Mark Wilson, were named to the second team. Wilson set a school record (still standing as of 2026) with four fumbles recovered during the 1982 season.

The team played its home games at the UNI-Dome in Cedar Falls, Iowa.

== Schedule ==
Date	Opponent	Site	Result	Attendance	Source
September 4	at Drake*	Drake Stadium; Des Moines, IA	L 30–39	16,650	
September 11	Southwest Missouri State	UNI-Dome; Cedar Falls, IA	W 10–0	11,715	
September 25	Eastern Illinois	UNI-Dome; Cedar Falls, IA	T 10–10	10,726	
October 2	Western Illinois	UNI-Dome; Cedar Falls, IA	W 21–9	8,707	
October 9	Idaho*	UNI-Dome; Cedar Falls, IA	L 13–38	11,438	
October 16	at Southeast Missouri State*	Houck Stadium; Cape Girardeau, MO	L 17–20	1,200	
October 23	Northern Michigan*	UNI-Dome; Cedar Falls, IA	W 33–14	6,369	
October 30	at Nevada*	Mackay Stadium; Reno, NV	L 0–37	2,600	
November 6	at North Dakota State*	Dacotah Field; Fargo, ND	L 7–12	6,100	
November 13	South Dakota*	UNI-Dome; Cedar Falls, IA	W 41–24	12,567	
November 20	at Youngstown State*	Stambaugh Stadium; Youngstown, OH	L 13–25	3,912	
*Non-conference game
