= 1982 Eastern Michigan Hurons football team =

American college football season

1982 Eastern Michigan Hurons football
- Conference: Mid-American Conference
- Record: 1–9–1 (1–7–1 MAC)
- Head coach: Mike Stock (5th season; first 3 games); Bob LaPointe (interim; final 8 games)
- Captains: Chris Babini; David Marshall
- Home stadium: Rynearson Stadium

1982 Mid-American Conference football standings
	Conf.					Overall
Team	W		L		T	W		L		T
Bowling Green $	7	–	2	–	0	7	–	5	–	0
Western Michigan	5	–	2	–	2	7	–	2	–	2
Miami (OH)	5	–	3	–	0	7	–	4	–	0
Central Michigan	5	–	3	–	1	6	–	4	–	1
Ohio	5	–	4	–	0	6	–	5	–	0
Toledo	5	–	4	–	0	6	–	5	–	0
Northern Illinois	5	–	4	–	0	5	–	5	–	0
Ball State	4	–	4	–	0	5	–	6	–	0
Eastern Michigan	1	–	7	–	1	1	–	9	–	1
Kent State	0	–	9	–	0	0	–	11	–	0
$ – Conference champion; The conference was a hybrid of NCAA Division I-A and I-AA programs. Central Michigan and Toledo were I-A while the other teams were classified as I-AA for the 1982 season only.

The 1982 Eastern Michigan Hurons football team represented Eastern Michigan University in the 1982 NCAA Division I-A football season. The Hurons compiled a 1–9–1 record (1–7–1 against conference opponents), finished in ninth place in the Mid-American Conference, and were outscored by their opponents, 205 to 85. Mike Stock was the head coach for the first three games, compiling a 0–3 record, part of a 27-game losing streak dating back to the 1980 season. Bob LaPointe was the head coach for the final eight games, compiling a 1–6–1 record. Stock had been the head coach since 1978. The team's statistical leaders included Steve Coulter with 1,290 passing yards, Ricky Calhoun with 656 rushing yards, and Rick Simpson with 385 receiving yards.

== Schedule ==
Date	Time	Opponent	Site	Result	Attendance	Source
September 11		at Akron *	Rubber Bowl; Akron, OH	L 7–14	35,684	
September 18	7:59 p.m.	at Louisiana Tech *	Joe Aillet Stadium; Ruston, LA	L 12–49	17,200	
September 25	1:30 p.m.	at Miami (OH)	Miami Field; Oxford, OH	L 0–35	17,914	
October 2	7:30 p.m.	Central Michigan	Rynearson Stadium; Ypsilanti, MI (rivalry)	L 8–13	12,983	
October 9	7:30 p.m.	at Toledo	Glass Bowl; Toledo, OH	L 19–20	22,827	
October 16	1:30 p.m.	Ohio ^{†}	Rynearson Stadium; Ypsilanti, MI	L 13–14	11,583	
October 23	2:30 p.m.	at Northern Illinois	Huskie Stadium; DeKalb, IL	L 0–10	23,350–26,132	
October 30	1:30 p.m.	Ball State	Rynearson Stadium; Ypsilanti, MI	L 7–16	10,129	
November 6	1:30 p.m.	Kent State	Rynearson Stadium; Ypsilanti, MI	W 9–7	7,208	
November 13	1:30 p.m.	at Bowling Green	Doyt Perry Stadium; Bowling Green, OH	L 7–24	16,012	
November 20	1:30 p.m.	Western Michigan	Waldo Stadium; Kalamazoo, MI	T 3–3	8,702	
*Non-conference game; ^{†}Homecoming; All times are in Eastern time
