= 1982 Northern Illinois Huskies football team =

American college football season

1982 Northern Illinois Huskies football
- Conference: Mid-American Conference
- Record: 5–5 (5–4 MAC)
- Head coach: Bill Mallory (3rd season)
- Defensive coordinator: Joe Novak (3rd season)
- MVP: Max Gill
- Captains: Larry Alleyne; Rich Barrent; Max Gill; Jim Keogh; Larry Tharp
- Home stadium: Huskie Stadium

1982 Mid-American Conference football standings
| | Conf. | | | | | Overall |
| Team | W | | L | | T | W | | L | | T |
|---|---|---|---|---|---|---|---|---|---|---|
| Bowling Green $ | 7 | – | 2 | – | 0 | 7 | – | 5 | – | 0 |
| Western Michigan | 5 | – | 2 | – | 2 | 7 | – | 2 | – | 2 |
| Miami (OH) | 5 | – | 3 | – | 0 | 7 | – | 4 | – | 0 |
| Central Michigan | 5 | – | 3 | – | 1 | 6 | – | 4 | – | 1 |
| Ohio | 5 | – | 4 | – | 0 | 6 | – | 5 | – | 0 |
| Toledo | 5 | – | 4 | – | 0 | 6 | – | 5 | – | 0 |
| Northern Illinois | 5 | – | 4 | – | 0 | 5 | – | 5 | – | 0 |
| Ball State | 4 | – | 4 | – | 0 | 5 | – | 6 | – | 0 |
| Eastern Michigan | 1 | – | 7 | – | 1 | 1 | – | 9 | – | 1 |
| Kent State | 0 | – | 9 | – | 0 | 0 | – | 11 | – | 0 |
$ – Conference champion; The conference was a hybrid of NCAA Division I-A and I-AA programs. Central Michigan and Toledo were I-A while the other teams were classified as I-AA for the 1982 season only.

The 1982 Northern Illinois Huskies football team represented Northern Illinois University as a member of the Mid-American Conference (MAC) during 1982 NCAA Division I-A football season. Led by third-year head coach Bill Mallory, the Huskies compiled an overall record of 5–5 with a mark of 5–4 in conference play, tying for fifth place in the MAC. Northern Illinois played home games at Huskie Stadium in DeKalb, Illinois.

== Schedule ==
| Date | Time | Opponent | Site | Result | Attendance | Source |
|---|---|---|---|---|---|---|
| September 4 | 6:30 p.m. | at Toledo | Glass Bowl; Toledo, OH | L 3–9 | 20,106–25,106 | |
| September 18 | 6:30 p.m. | Kent State | Huskie Stadium; DeKalb, IL | W 23–15 | 21,212–24,736 | |
| September 25 | 1:00 p.m. | at Northwestern* | Dyche Stadium; Evanston, IL | L 6–31 | 22,078 | |
| October 2 | 6:30 p.m. | Ball State | Huskie Stadium; DeKalb, IL (rivalry) | L 7–14 | 23,563 | |
| October 16 | 12:30 p.m. | at Bowling Green | Doyt Perry Stadium; Bowling Green, OH | L 18–20 | 18,200 | |
| October 23 | 1:30 p.m. | Eastern Michigan | Huskie Stadium; DeKalb, IL | W 10–0 | 23,350–26,132 | |
| October 30 | 12:00 p.m. | at Western Michigan | Waldo Stadium; Kalamazoo, MI | L 3–27 | 17,250 | |
| November 6 | 12:40 p.m. | at Ohio | Peden Stadium; Athens, OH | W 36–0 | 19,096 | |
| November 13 | 1:30 p.m. | Miami (OH) | Huskie Stadium; DeKalb, IL | W 12–7 | 15,285–15,385 | |
| November 20 | 1:30 p.m. | Central Michigan | Huskie Stadium; DeKalb, IL | W 19–13 | 22,618–24,380 | |
*Non-conference game; All times are in Central time
