= 1982 Austin Peay Governors football team =

American college football season

1982 Austin Peay Governors football
- Conference: Ohio Valley Conference
- Record: 3–7 (2–5 OVC)
- Head coach: Emory Hale (2nd season)
- Home stadium: Municipal Stadium

1982 Ohio Valley Conference football standings
	Conf.					Overall
Team	W		L		T	W		L		T
No. 1 Eastern Kentucky $^	7	–	0	–	0	13	–	0	–	0
Akron	5	–	2	–	0	6	–	5	–	0
Middle Tennessee	4	–	3	–	0	8	–	3	–	0
Youngstown State	4	–	3	–	0	6	–	5	–	0
Morehead State	2	–	5	–	0	5	–	6	–	0
Murray State	2	–	5	–	0	4	–	7	–	0
Austin Peay	2	–	5	–	0	3	–	7	–	0
Tennessee Tech	1	–	6	–	0	3	–	8	–	0
$ – Conference champion; ^ – NCAA Division I-AA playoff participant; Rankings from NCAA Division I-AA Football Committee poll

The 1982 Austin Peay Governors football team represented Austin Peay State University as a member of the Ohio Valley Conference (OVC) during the 1982 NCAA Division I-AA football season. Led by second-year head coach Emory Hale, the Governors compiled an overall record of 3–7, with a mark of 2–5 in conference play, and finished tied for fifth in the OVC.

== Schedule ==
Date	Opponent	Site	Result	Attendance	Source
September 11	at Kentucky State*	Alumni Field; Frankfort, KY	W 31–24	1,500	
September 18	Tennessee–Martin*	Municipal Stadium; Clarksville, TN	L 14–17	7,200	
September 25	at Western Kentucky*	L. T. Smith Stadium; Bowling Green, KY	L 15–33	9,000	
October 2	No. 1 Eastern Kentucky	Municipal Stadium; Clarksville, TN	L 18–27	6,000	
October 9	Morehead State	Municipal Stadium; Clarksville, TN	W 17–16	4,500	
October 16	Youngstown State	Municipal Stadium; Clarksville, TN	L 9–31	4,500	
October 23	at Middle Tennessee	Johnny "Red" Floyd Stadium; Murfreesboro, TN	L 7–24	10,000	
November 6	Murray State	Municipal Stadium; Clarksville, TN	L 7–21	7,500	
November 13	Tennessee Tech	Municipal Stadium; Clarksville, TN	W 31–27	3,000	
November 20	at Akron	Rubber Bowl; Akron, OH	L 7–42	3,186	
*Non-conference game; Rankings from NCAA Division I-AA Football Committee Poll released prior to the game
