= Steve Loney =

American football player and coach (born 1952)

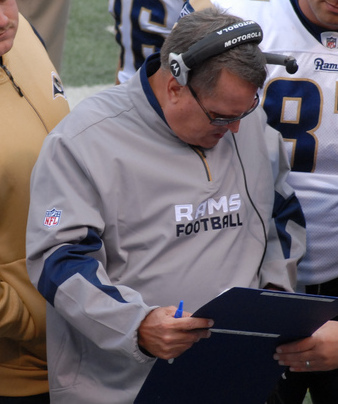

Current position
- Title: Offensive line coach

Biographical details
- Born: April 26, 1952 (age 74); Marshalltown, Iowa, U.S.

Playing career
- 1970–1973: Iowa State
- Position: Offensive lineman

Coaching career (HC unless noted)
- 1974: Iowa State (GA)
- 1975: Missouri Western (OL)
- 1976: Missouri Western (OC/OL)
- 1977–1978: Leavenworth HS (KS)
- 1979–1980: Morehead State (AHC/OL)
- 1981–1983: Morehead State
- 1984–1986: The Citadel (AHC/OL)
- 1989–1992: Colorado State (AHC/OL)
- 1993: Phoenix Cardinals (AOL)
- 1994: Connecticut (AHC/WR)
- 1995–1997: Iowa State (OC/OL)
- 1998–1999: Minnesota (OC/OL)
- 2000–2001: Iowa State (OC/OL)
- 2002–2004: Minnesota Vikings (OL)
- 2005: Minnesota Vikings (OC/OL)
- 2006: Arizona Cardinals (OL)
- 2007: Drake
- 2008–2011: St. Louis Rams (OL)
- 2012–2013: Tampa Bay Buccaneers (AOL)
- 2015–2016: Dallas Cowboys (AOL)
- 2017: Dallas Cowboys (TE)
- 2022: Pittsburgh Maulers (OL)

Head coaching record
- Overall: 14–29

Steve Loney (born April 26, 1952) is an American former football coach who was the offensive line coach for the Pittsburgh Maulers of the United States Football League (USFL). He was the offensive line coach for the Minnesota Vikings from 2003 to 2005, the Arizona Cardinals in 2006, and the St. Louis Rams from 2008 to 2011. Additionally, his highest coaching assignment in the National Football League (NFL) was as the offensive coordinator of the Vikings in 2005 under head coach Mike Tice. He held the dual role of offensive coordinator and offensive line coach at his alma mater Iowa State University from 1995 to 1997 and 2000 to 2001, and at the University of Minnesota from 1998 to 1999.

Loney was the head football coach at Morehead State University from 1981 to 1983. He was the head football coach at Drake University for one season, in 2007, compiling a record of 6–5.

Loney is the author of a book titled 101 Offensive Line Drills, a book focusing on offensive line drills.

== Head coaching record ==
Year	Team	Overall	Conference	Standing	Bowl/playoffs
Morehead State Eagles (Ohio Valley Conference) (1981–1983)
1981	Morehead State	1–9	0–8	9th	
1982	Morehead State	5–6	2–5	T–5th	
1983	Morehead State	2–9	1–6	8th	
Morehead State:		8–24	3–19		
Drake Bulldogs (Pioneer Football League) (2007)
2007	Drake	6–5	3–4	5th	
Drake:		6–5	3–4		
Total:		14–29			
