= 1981 Eastern Kentucky Colonels football team =

American college football season

1981 Eastern Kentucky Colonels football

OVC champion

NCAA Division I-AA Championship Game, L 23–34 vs Idaho State
- Conference: Ohio Valley Conference
- Record: 12–2 (8–0 OVC)
- Head coach: Roy Kidd (18th season)
- Home stadium: Hanger Field

1981 Ohio Valley Conference football standings
	Conf.					Overall
Team	W		L		T	W		L		T
No. 1 Eastern Kentucky $^	8	–	0	–	0	12	–	2	–	0
No. 9 Murray State	5	–	3	–	0	8	–	3	–	0
Youngstown State	5	–	3	–	0	7	–	4	–	0
Tennessee Tech	4	–	4	–	0	6	–	5	–	0
Middle Tennessee	4	–	4	–	0	6	–	5	–	0
Western Kentucky	4	–	4	–	0	6	–	5	–	0
Akron	4	–	4	–	0	5	–	5	–	0
Austin Peay	3	–	5	–	0	5	–	5	–	0
Morehead State	0	–	8	–	0	1	–	9	–	0
$ – Conference champion; ^ – NCAA Division I-AA playoff participant; Rankings from NCAA Division I-AA Football Committee poll

The 1981 Eastern Kentucky Colonels football team represented Eastern Kentucky University as a member of the Ohio Valley Conference (OVC) during the 1981 NCAA Division I-AA football season. Led by 18th-year head coach Roy Kidd, the Colonels compiled an overall record of 12–2, with a mark of 8–0 in conference play, and finished as OVC champion. Eastern Kentucky advanced to the NCAA Division I-AA Championship Game and were defeated by Idaho State.

== Schedule ==
Date	Opponent	Rank	Site	TV	Result	Attendance	Source
September 5	South Carolina State*		Hanger Field; Richmond, KY		W 26–0	11,400	
September 12	at Youngstown State		Rayen Stadium; Youngstown, OH		W 26–6		
September 19	at Navy*		Navy–Marine Corps Memorial Stadium; Annapolis, MD		L 0–24	16,379	
September 26	Akron	No. 5	Hanger Field; Richmond, KY		W 37–0	15,800	
October 3	Austin Peay	No. 5	Hanger Field; Richmond, KY		W 41–14		
October 10	at Middle Tennessee	No. 4	Johnny "Red" Floyd Stadium; Murfreesboro, TN		W 23–7	11,500	
October 17	Dayton*	No. 4	Hanger Field; Richmond, KY		W 14–3		
October 24	Western Kentucky	No. T–1	Hanger Field; Richmond, KY (rivalry)		W 19–11	20,800	
October 31	at No. T–10 Murray State	No. 1	Roy Stewart Stadium; Murray, KY		W 24–20	16,600	
November 7	Tennessee Tech	No. 1	Hanger Field; Richmond, KY		W 63–10		
November 21	at Morehead State	No. 1	Jayne Stadium; Morehead, KY (rivalry)		W 21–17		
December 5	No. 7 Delaware*	No. 1	Hanger Field; Richmond, KY (NCAA Division I-AA Quarterfinal)		W 35–28	8,100	
December 12	at No. 5 Boise State*	No. 1	Bronco Stadium; Boise, ID (NCAA Division I-AA Semifinal)		W 23–17	20,176	
December 19	vs. No. 2 Idaho State*	No. 1	Memorial Stadium; Wichita Falls, TX (NCAA Division I-AA Championship Game—Pioneer Bowl)	ABC	L 23–34	11,002	
*Non-conference game; Rankings from NCAA Division I-AA Football Committee Poll released prior to the game
