= 1982 Indiana State Sycamores football team =

American college football season

1982 Indiana State Sycamores football
- Conference: Missouri Valley Conference
- Record: 5–6 (3–2 MVC)
- Head coach: Dennis Raetz (3rd season)
- Home stadium: Memorial Stadium

1982 Missouri Valley Conference football standings
	Conf.					Overall
Team	W		L		T	W		L		T
Tulsa $	6	–	0	–	0	10	–	1	–	0
Wichita State	4	–	1	–	0	8	–	3	–	0
Southern Illinois	4	–	1	–	0	6	–	5	–	0
Indiana State	3	–	2	–	0	5	–	6	–	0
Drake	2	–	4	–	0	4	–	7	–	0
New Mexico State	1	–	4	–	0	3	–	8	–	0
West Texas State	1	–	4	–	0	3	–	8	–	0
Illinois State	0	–	5	–	0	2	–	9	–	0
$ – Conference champion; The conference was a hybrid of NCAA Division I-A and I-AA programs. New Mexico State, Tulsa, and Wichita State were I-A and the other teams were I-AA.

The 1982 Indiana State Sycamores football team was an American football team that represented Indiana State University as a member of the Missouri Valley Conference during the 1982 NCAA Division I-AA football season. In their third year under head coach Dennis Raetz, the team compiled a 5–6 record (3–2 in the MVC).

== Schedule ==
Date	Time	Opponent	Site	Result	Attendance	Source
September 4		at Central Michigan*	Perry Shorts Stadium; Mount Pleasant, MI	L 10–35	15,822	
September 11		New Mexico State	Memorial Stadium; Terre Haute, IN	W 14–10	10,284	
September 18		McNeese State*	Memorial Stadium; Terre Haute, IN	W 13–10	11,096	
September 25		at Ball State*	Ball State Stadium; Muncie, IN (rivalry)	W 17–0	11,375	
October 2		at Drake	Drake Stadium; Des Moines, IA	W 29–19	10,084	
October 9		at Maryland*	Byrd Stadium; College Park, MD	L 0–38	31,500	
October 16		No. 20 Eastern Illinois*^{†}	Memorial Stadium; Terre Haute, IN	L 12–16	15,471	
October 23		at Southern Illinois	McAndrew Stadium; Carbondale, IL	L 9–21	14,200	
October 30		Illinois State	Memorial Stadium; Terre Haute, IN	W 24–7	6,244	
November 6	2:13 p.m.	at Louisville*	Cardinal Stadium; Louisville, KY	L 23–35	15,054	
November 13		at Tulsa	Skelly Stadium; Tulsa, OK	L 14–48	23,929	
*Non-conference game; ^{†}Homecoming; Rankings from NCAA Division I-AA Football Committee Poll released prior to the game; All times are in Eastern time
