= 1982 Western Michigan Broncos football team =

American college football season

1982 Western Michigan Broncos football
- Conference: Mid-American Conference
- Record: 7–2–2 (5–2–2 MAC)
- Head coach: Jack Harbaugh (1st season)
- Offensive coordinator: Steve Szabo (1st season)
- MVP: Mark Kujacznski
- Captains: Les Garrett; Dave Knapp; Duane Wilson
- Home stadium: Waldo Stadium

1982 Mid-American Conference football standings
	Conf.					Overall
Team	W		L		T	W		L		T
Bowling Green $	7	–	2	–	0	7	–	5	–	0
Western Michigan	5	–	2	–	2	7	–	2	–	2
Miami (OH)	5	–	3	–	0	7	–	4	–	0
Central Michigan	5	–	3	–	1	6	–	4	–	1
Ohio	5	–	4	–	0	6	–	5	–	0
Toledo	5	–	4	–	0	6	–	5	–	0
Northern Illinois	5	–	4	–	0	5	–	5	–	0
Ball State	4	–	4	–	0	5	–	6	–	0
Eastern Michigan	1	–	7	–	1	1	–	9	–	1
Kent State	0	–	9	–	0	0	–	11	–	0
$ – Conference champion; The conference was a hybrid of NCAA Division I-A and I-AA programs. Central Michigan and Toledo were I-A while the other teams were classified as I-AA for the 1982 season only.

The 1982 Western Michigan Broncos football team was an American football team that represented Western Michigan University during the 1982 NCAA Division I-A football season. In their first season under head coach Jack Harbaugh, the Broncos compiled a 7–2–2 record and finished in second place in the Mid-American Conference (MAC).

The team's statistical leaders were Chris Conklin with 853 passing yards, Shawn Faulkner with 910 rushing yards, and Bob Phillips with 39 catches for 577 receiving yards. Linebacker Les Garrett, defensive tackle/middle guard Dave Knapp, and tackle Duane Wilson were the team captains. Defensive back Mark Kujacznski received the team's most outstanding player award.

On December 10, 1981, Jack Harbaugh was hired as Western's head football coach. Harbaugh was 42 years old at the time and had been defensive coordinator at Stanford since 1980. He had played college football at Bowling Green and served as an assistant football coach at Michigan from 1973 to 1979.

== Schedule ==
Date	Time	Opponent	Site	Result	Attendance	Source
September 4	1:03 p.m.	Grand Valley State*	Waldo Stadium; Kalamazoo, MI	W 28–3	15,881–15,991	
September 11	7:00 p.m.	at Marshall*	Fairfield Stadium; Huntington, WV	W 34–0	17,188	
September 25	1:00 p.m.	Kent State	Waldo Stadium; Kalamazoo, MI	W 24–14	15,542	
October 2	1:30 p.m.	at Bowling Green	Doyt Perry Stadium; Bowling Green, OH	L 3–7	18,407	
October 9	1:28 p.m.	at Central Michigan	Perry Shorts Stadium; Mount Pleasant, MI (rivalry)	T 18–18	28,632	
October 16	1:00 p.m.	Miami (OH)	Waldo Stadium; Kalamazoo, MI	W 10–0	21,500–21,550	
October 23	1:30 p.m.	at Ball State	Ball State Stadium; Muncie, IN	L 6–13	15,700	
October 30	1:00 p.m.	Northern Illinois	Waldo Stadium; Kalamazoo, MI	W 27–3	17,250	
November 6	1:30 p.m.	at Toledo	Glass Bowl; Toledo, OH	W 17–10	22,423	
November 13	1:00 p.m.	Ohio	Waldo Stadium; Kalamazoo, MI	W 16–7	13,270	
November 20	1:30 p.m.	Eastern Michigan	Waldo Stadium; Kalamazoo, MI	T 3–3	8,702	
*Non-conference game; All times are in Eastern time
