= 1982 New Mexico State Aggies football team =

American college football season

1982 New Mexico State Aggies football
- Conference: Missouri Valley Conference
- Record: 3–8 (1–4 MVC)
- Head coach: Gil Krueger (5th season)
- Home stadium: Aggie Memorial Stadium

1982 Missouri Valley Conference football standings
	Conf.					Overall
Team	W		L		T	W		L		T
Tulsa $	6	–	0	–	0	10	–	1	–	0
Wichita State	4	–	1	–	0	8	–	3	–	0
Southern Illinois	4	–	1	–	0	6	–	5	–	0
Indiana State	3	–	2	–	0	5	–	6	–	0
Drake	2	–	4	–	0	4	–	7	–	0
New Mexico State	1	–	4	–	0	3	–	8	–	0
West Texas State	1	–	4	–	0	3	–	8	–	0
Illinois State	0	–	5	–	0	2	–	9	–	0
$ – Conference champion; The conference was a hybrid of NCAA Division I-A and I-AA programs. New Mexico State, Tulsa, and Wichita State were I-A and the other teams were I-AA.

The 1982 New Mexico State Aggies football team was an American football team that represented New Mexico State University in the Missouri Valley Conference during the 1980 NCAA Division I-A football season. In their fifth year under head coach Gil Krueger, the Aggies compiled a 3–8 record. The team played its home games at Aggie Memorial Stadium in Las Cruces, New Mexico.

== Schedule ==
Date	Time	Opponent	Site	Result	Attendance	Source
September 4		UTEP*	Aggie Memorial Stadium; Las Cruces, NM (rivalry)	L 17–20	27,306	
September 11		at Indiana State	Memorial Stadium; Terre Haute, IN	L 10–14	10,284	
September 18		at No. 3 Nebraska*	Memorial Stadium; Lincoln, NE	L 0–68	76,141	
September 25		at Colorado State*	Hughes Stadium; Fort Collins, CO	L 17–28	23,129	
October 2		Illinois State	Aggie Memorial Stadium; Las Cruces, NM	W 26–17	13,571	
October 9		Tulsa	Aggie Memorial Stadium; Las Cruces, NM	L 14–31	11,633	
October 16	12:30 p.m.	at Wichita State	Cessna Stadium; Wichita, KS	L 26–28	23,500–23,506	
October 23		at New Mexico*	University Stadium; Albuquerque, NM (rivalry)	L 14–66	25,499	
October 30		Northern Arizona*	Aggie Memorial Stadium; Las Cruces, NM	W 34–32	14,312	
November 6	1:30 p.m.	North Texas State*	Aggie Memorial Stadium; Las Cruces, NM	W 30–19	13,796	
November 13		at West Texas State	Kimbrough Memorial Stadium; Canyon, TX	L 28–30	7,114	
*Non-conference game; Rankings from AP Poll released prior to the game; All times are in Mountain time
