= 1982 Ohio Bobcats football team =

American college football season

1982 Ohio Bobcats football
- Conference: Mid-American Conference
- Record: 6–5 (5–4 MAC)
- Head coach: Brian Burke (4th season)
- Home stadium: Peden Stadium

1982 Mid-American Conference football standings
	Conf.					Overall
Team	W		L		T	W		L		T
Bowling Green $	7	–	2	–	0	7	–	5	–	0
Western Michigan	5	–	2	–	2	7	–	2	–	2
Miami (OH)	5	–	3	–	0	7	–	4	–	0
Central Michigan	5	–	3	–	1	6	–	4	–	1
Ohio	5	–	4	–	0	6	–	5	–	0
Toledo	5	–	4	–	0	6	–	5	–	0
Northern Illinois	5	–	4	–	0	5	–	5	–	0
Ball State	4	–	4	–	0	5	–	6	–	0
Eastern Michigan	1	–	7	–	1	1	–	9	–	1
Kent State	0	–	9	–	0	0	–	11	–	0
$ – Conference champion; The conference was a hybrid of NCAA Division I-A and I-AA programs. Central Michigan and Toledo were I-A while the other teams were classified as I-AA for the 1982 season only.

The 1982 Ohio Bobcats football team was an American football team that represented Ohio University in the Mid-American Conference (MAC) during the 1982 NCAA Division I-A football season. In their fourth season under head coach Brian Burke, the Bobcats compiled a 6–5 record (5–4 against MAC opponents), finished in a tie for fifth place in the MAC, and were outscored by all opponents by a combined total of 259 to 160. They played their home games in Peden Stadium in Athens, Ohio.

== Schedule ==
Date	Time	Opponent	Site	Result	Attendance	Source
September 4	1:30 p.m.	at Bowling Green	Doyt Perry Stadium; Bowling Green, OH	L 0–40	19,200	
September 11	8:05 p.m.	at Minnesota*	Hubert H. Humphrey Metrodome; Minneapolis, MN	L 3–57	56,168	
September 18	1:30 p.m.	vs. Richmond*	Ohio Stadium; Columbus, OH (Children's Hospital Benefit Bowl)	W 23–14	23,000	
October 2	1:30 p.m.	Toledo	Peden Stadium; Athens, OH	W 17–14	19,800	
October 9	2:00 p.m.	at Ball State	Ball State Stadium; Muncie, IN	W 34–7	14,600	
October 16	1:30 p.m.	at Eastern Michigan	Rynearson Stadium; Ypsilanti, MI	W 14–13	11,583	
October 23	1:30 p.m.	Miami (OH)	Peden Stadium; Athens, OH (rivalry)	W 20–0	20,233–20,263	
October 30	1:32 p.m.	at Central Michigan	Perry Shorts Stadium; Mount Pleasant, MI	L 18–42	24,382	
November 6	1:40 p.m.	Northern Illinois	Peden Stadium; Athens, OH	L 0–36	19,096	
November 13	1:00 p.m.	at Western Michigan	Waldo Stadium; Kalamazoo, MI	L 7–16	13,270	
November 20	1:30 p.m.	Kent State	Peden Stadium; Athens, OH	W 24–20		
*Non-conference game; All times are in Eastern time
