= 1981 Tennessee Tech Golden Eagles football team =

American college football season

1981 Tennessee Tech Golden Eagles football
- Conference: Ohio Valley Conference
- Record: 6–5 (4–4 OVC)
- Head coach: Don Wade (14th season)
- Home stadium: Tucker Stadium

1981 Ohio Valley Conference football standings
	Conf.					Overall
Team	W		L		T	W		L		T
No. 1 Eastern Kentucky $^	8	–	0	–	0	12	–	2	–	0
No. 9 Murray State	5	–	3	–	0	8	–	3	–	0
Youngstown State	5	–	3	–	0	7	–	4	–	0
Tennessee Tech	4	–	4	–	0	6	–	5	–	0
Middle Tennessee	4	–	4	–	0	6	–	5	–	0
Western Kentucky	4	–	4	–	0	6	–	5	–	0
Akron	4	–	4	–	0	5	–	5	–	0
Austin Peay	3	–	5	–	0	5	–	5	–	0
Morehead State	0	–	8	–	0	1	–	9	–	0
$ – Conference champion; ^ – NCAA Division I-AA playoff participant; Rankings from NCAA Division I-AA Football Committee poll

The 1981 Tennessee Tech Golden Eagles football team represented Tennessee Technological University (commonly referred to as Tennessee Tech) as a member of the Ohio Valley Conference (OVC) during the 1981 NCAA Division I-AA football season. Led by 14th-year head coach Don Wade, the Golden Eagles compiled an overall record of 6–5, with a mark of 4–4 in conference play, and finished last in the OVC.

== Schedule ==
Date	Opponent	Site	Result	Attendance	Source
September 5	at East Tennessee State	Memorial Center; Johnson City, TN	L 22–31	7,212	
September 12	Northeast Missouri State*	Tucker Stadium; Cookeville, TN	W 16–7		
September 26	at No. 2 Murray State	Roy Stewart Stadium; Murray, KY	L 10–15		
October 3	Tennessee–Martin*	Tucker Stadium; Cookeville, TN	L 21–24		
October 10	Akron	Tucker Stadium; Cookeville, TN	L 7–10	8,345	
October 17	at Western Kentucky	L. T. Smith Stadium; Bowling Green, KY	W 14–3	11,500	
October 24	Morehead State	Tucker Stadium; Cookeville, TN	W 35–17	12,110	
October 31	Troy State*	Tucker Stadium; Cookeville, TN	W 37–28	4,360	
November 7	at No. 1 Eastern Kentucky	Hanger Field; Richmond, KY	L 10–63		
November 14	Austin Peay	Tucker Stadium; Cookeville, TN	W 29–24		
November 21	at Middle Tennessee	Johnny "Red" Floyd Stadium; Murfreesboro, TN	W 28–9	7,000	
*Non-conference game; Rankings from NCAA Division I-AA Football Committee Poll released prior to the game
