= 1982 Eastern Illinois Panthers football team =

American college football season

1982 Eastern Illinois Panthers football

Mid-Con co-champion

NCAA Division I-AA First Round, L 19–20 vs. Tennessee State
- Conference: Association of Mid-Continent Universities

Ranking
- AP: No. 5
- Record: 11–1–1 (2–0–1 Mid-Con)
- Head coach: Darrell Mudra (5th season)
- Home stadium: O'Brien Stadium

1982 Association of Mid-Continent Universities football standings
	Conf.					Overall
Team	W		L		T	W		L		T
No. 5 Eastern Illinois +^	2	–	0	–	1	11	–	1	–	1
Northern Iowa +	2	–	0	–	1	4	–	6	–	1
Southwest Missouri State	1	–	2	–	0	5	–	6	–	0
Western Illinois	0	–	3	–	0	2	–	8	–	0
+ – Conference co-champions; ^ – NCAA Division I-AA playoff participant; Rankings from NCAA Division I-AA Football Committee poll

The 1982 Eastern Illinois Panthers football team was an American football team that represented Eastern Illinois University as a member of the Association of Mid-Continent Universities during the 1982 NCAA Division I-AA football season. In their fifth year under head coach Darrell Mudra, the team compiled a 11–1–1 record (2–0–1 in the Mid-Con), and were defeated by Tennessee State in the NCAA Division I-AA First Round.

== Schedule ==
Date	Opponent	Rank	Site	Result	Attendance	Source
September 4	Illinois State*		O'Brien Stadium; Charleston, IL (rivalry)	W 27–14	8,200	
September 11	Northeast Missouri State*		O'Brien Stadium; Charleston, IL	W 18–17	7,000	
September 18	Wayne State (MI)*		O'Brien Stadium; Charleston, IL	W 27–0	7,200	
September 25	at Northern Iowa		UNI-Dome; Cedar Falls, IA	T 10–10	10,726	
October 2	at Youngstown State*		Stambaugh Stadium; Youngstown, OH	W 27–23	8,895	
October 9	Akron*		O'Brien Stadium; Charleston, IL	W 18–0	10,631	
October 16	at Indiana State	No. 20	Memorial Stadium; Terre Haute, IN	W 16–12	15,471	
October 23	at Western Illinois	No. 11	Hanson Field; Macomb, IL	W 31–7	10,399	
October 30	Southern Illinois*	No. 7	O'Brien Stadium; Charleston, IL	W 20–7	9,120	
November 6	at Southwest Missouri State	No. 6	Briggs Stadium; Springfield, MO	W 36–7	3,200	
November 13	Kentucky State*	No. 5	O'Brien Stadium; Charleston, IL	W 73–0	12,425	
November 27	No. 8 Jackson State*	No. 5	O'Brien Stadium; Charleston, IL (NCAA Division I-AA First Round)	W 16–13 ^{OT}		
December 4	at No. 4 Tennessee State*	No. 5	Hale Stadium; Nashville, TN (NCAA Division I-AA Quarterfinal)	L 19–20		
*Non-conference game; Rankings from NCAA Division I-AA Football Committee Poll released prior to the game

== Roster ==
1982 Eastern Illinois Panthers football team roster
Players
Coaches
Offense

Pos.	#	Name	Class
QB	11	Jeff Christensen	Sr

Defense

Pos.	#	Name	Class
CB	4	Reggie Drew	So
S	28	Robert Williams	Jr

Special teams

Pos.	#	Name	Class

Head coach

- Darrell Mudra

Coordinators/assistant coaches

- Alonzo Lee
  (Linebackers coach)

Legend

- (C) Team captain
- (S) Suspended
- (I) Ineligible
- Injured
- Redshirt
