= Bob LaPointe =

American football coach

LaPointe, during his time as a coach at Eastern Michigan

Robert J. LaPointe (November 5, 1945 – January 31, 2012) was an American football coach in Michigan from 1968 through 2010. He is best known for winning Michigan's Class B high school state championship in 1975, and for serving as interim head coach at Eastern Michigan University for part of the 1982 season.

LaPointe began his head coaching career in 1970 leading Southgate Aquinas High School to a 6–1–1 record in his only season at the school. In 1971, he took an assistant coaching job at Divine Child High School under head coach Bill McCartney.

From 1974 through 1977, LaPointe was the head coach at Divine Child High School in Dearborn, Michigan, where his team went undefeated and won a state championship in 1975. His record in 4 seasons was 29–6.

In 1978, newly hired Eastern Michigan University head coach Mike Stock brought LaPointe to the university. Three games into the 1982 season Stock was fired, immediately after losing his twenty-second consecutive game, the major-college longest losing streak in the country. LaPointe was named the interim head coach, and the school immediately began a nationwide search for a new coach. The team received widespread attention for their various attempts to end the streak, which included "bringing a coffin to the locker room before the game...as a reminder to 'kill the streak'", and hiring a local hypnotist. The team lost his first five games as head coach, two by a single point each, before defeating Kent State 9–7, ending a school-record 27-game losing streak that had lasted more than two years. For the following season, Jim Harkema was brought in as head coach.

Lapointe was then head coach of Harper Woods Notre Dame High School from 1984 to 1990. His record in 7 seasons was 25–38. His 1989 team won the conference championship with a 5–4 record.

In 1991, he was named head coach of Belleville High School in Belleville, Michigan, where he remained for nearly 20 years until his retirement in 2010. He led the Tigers to 11 conference championships and 8 playoff appearances. He coached eventual National Football League players Kris Jenkins, Cullen Jenkins, and Ian Gold. His coaching record at Belleville was 100–90.

In 2002, he was inducted into the Michigan High School Football Association Coaches Hall of Fame. His career high school head coach record is 126–129–1.

He died in 2012.

== Head coaching record ==
=== College ===
Year	Team	Overall	Conference	Standing	Bowl/playoffs
Eastern Michigan Hurons (Mid-American Conference) (1982)
1982	Eastern Michigan	1–6–1	1–6–1	9th	
Eastern Michigan:		1–6–1	1–6–1		
Total:		1–6–1			
