= 1982 Bowling Green Falcons football team =

American college football season

1982 Bowling Green Falcons football

MAC champion

California Bowl, L 28–29 vs. Fresno State
- Conference: Mid-American Conference
- Record: 7–5 (7–2 MAC)
- Head coach: Denny Stolz (6th season)
- Home stadium: Doyt Perry Stadium

1982 Mid-American Conference football standings
	Conf.					Overall
Team	W		L		T	W		L		T
Bowling Green $	7	–	2	–	0	7	–	5	–	0
Western Michigan	5	–	2	–	2	7	–	2	–	2
Miami (OH)	5	–	3	–	0	7	–	4	–	0
Central Michigan	5	–	3	–	1	6	–	4	–	1
Ohio	5	–	4	–	0	6	–	5	–	0
Toledo	5	–	4	–	0	6	–	5	–	0
Northern Illinois	5	–	4	–	0	5	–	5	–	0
Ball State	4	–	4	–	0	5	–	6	–	0
Eastern Michigan	1	–	7	–	1	1	–	9	–	1
Kent State	0	–	9	–	0	0	–	11	–	0
$ – Conference champion; The conference was a hybrid of NCAA Division I-A and I-AA programs. Central Michigan and Toledo were I-A while the other teams were classified as I-AA for the 1982 season only.

The 1982 Bowling Green Falcons football team was an American football team that represented Bowling Green University in the Mid-American Conference (MAC) during the 1982 NCAA Division I-AA football season. In their sixth season under head coach Denny Stolz, the Falcons compiled a 7–5 record (7–2 against MAC opponents), won the MAC championship, and outscored their opponents by a combined total of 265 to 199.

The team's statistical leaders included Brian McClure with 1,391 passing yards, Chip Otten with 673 rushing yards, and Shawn Potts with 841 receiving yards.

== Schedule ==
Date	Time	Opponent	Site	Result	Attendance	Source
September 4	1:30 p.m.	Ohio	Doyt Perry Stadium; Bowling Green, OH	W 40–0	19,200	
September 18		at Central Michigan	Kelly/Shorts Stadium; Mount Pleasant, MI	W 34–30	25,883	
October 2	1:30 p.m.	Western Michigan	Doyt Perry Stadium; Bowling Green, OH	W 7–3	18,407	
October 9	1:35 p.m.	at Miami (OH)	Miami Field; Oxford, OH	L 12–17	21,833	
October 16	1:30 p.m.	Northern Illinois	Doyt Perry Stadium; Bowling Green, OH	W 20–18	18,200	
October 23	7:30 p.m.	at Toledo	Glass Bowl; Toledo, OH (rivalry)	L 10–24	31,369	
October 30	1:01 p.m.	at Kent State	Dix Stadium; Kent, OH (rivalry)	W 41–7	10,200	
November 6	1:30 p.m.	Ball State	Doyt Perry Stadium; Bowling Green, OH	W 28–7	21,400–21,404	
November 13	1:30 p.m.	Eastern Michigan	Doyt Perry Stadium; Bowling Green, OH	W 24–7	16,012	
November 20	10:32 p.m.	at Long Beach State*	Anaheim Stadium; Anaheim, CA	L 7–24	4,415	
November 25		at North Carolina*	Kenan Memorial Stadium; Chapel Hill, NC	L 14–33	33,000	
December 18		at Fresno State*	Bulldog Stadium; Fresno, CA (California Bowl)	L 28–29	30,000	
*Non-conference game; All times are in Eastern time
