= 1981 Murray State Racers football team =

American college football season

1981 Murray State Racers football
- Conference: Ohio Valley Conference
- Record: 8–3 (5–3 OVC)
- Head coach: Frank Beamer (1st season)
- Defensive coordinator: Mike Mahoney (1st season)
- Home stadium: Roy Stewart Stadium

1981 Ohio Valley Conference football standings
	Conf.					Overall
Team	W		L		T	W		L		T
No. 1 Eastern Kentucky $^	8	–	0	–	0	12	–	2	–	0
No. 9 Murray State	5	–	3	–	0	8	–	3	–	0
Youngstown State	5	–	3	–	0	7	–	4	–	0
Tennessee Tech	4	–	4	–	0	6	–	5	–	0
Middle Tennessee	4	–	4	–	0	6	–	5	–	0
Western Kentucky	4	–	4	–	0	6	–	5	–	0
Akron	4	–	4	–	0	5	–	5	–	0
Austin Peay	3	–	5	–	0	5	–	5	–	0
Morehead State	0	–	8	–	0	1	–	9	–	0
$ – Conference champion; ^ – NCAA Division I-AA playoff participant; Rankings from NCAA Division I-AA Football Committee poll

The 1981 Murray State Racers football team represented Murray State University during the 1981 NCAA Division I-AA football season. Led by first-year head coach Frank Beamer, the Racers compiled an overall record of 8–3 with a mark of 5–3 on conference play, and finished tied for second in the OVC.

== Schedule ==
Date	Opponent	Rank	Site	Result	Attendance	Source
September 5	at Southeast Missouri State*		Houck Stadium; Cape Girardeau, MO	W 37–23		
September 12	vs. Florida A&M*		Gator Bowl Stadium; Jacksonville, FL	W 14–11	32,600	
September 19	at Youngstown State		Rayen Stadium; Youngstown, OH	W 13–9		
September 26	Tennessee Tech	No. 2	Roy Stewart Stadium; Murray, KY	W 15–10		
October 3	Morehead State	No. 2	Roy Stewart Stadium; Murray, KY	W 20–7	9,500	
October 10	at Tennessee–Martin*	No. 1	Pacer Stadium; Martin, TN	W 10–7	9,000	
October 17	at No. 7 Middle Tennessee	No. 1	Johnny "Red" Floyd Stadium; Murfreesboro, TN	L 9–14	6,000	
October 24	at Akron	No. 4	Rubber Bowl; Akron, OH	L 19–20		
October 31	No. 1 Eastern Kentucky	No. T–10	Roy Stewart Stadium; Murray, KY	L 20–24	16,600	
November 7	Austin Peay		Roy Stewart Stadium; Murray, KY	W 34–29	7,800	
November 21	at Western Kentucky		L. T. Smith Stadium; Bowling Green, KY (rivalry)	W 38–6	8,500	
*Non-conference game; Rankings from NCAA Division I-AA Football Committee Poll released prior to the game
