= 1982 Middle Tennessee Blue Raiders football team =

American college football season

1982 Middle Tennessee Blue Raiders football
- Conference: Ohio Valley Conference
- Record: 8–3 (4–3 OVC)
- Head coach: Boots Donnelly (4th season)
- Home stadium: Johnny "Red" Floyd Stadium

1982 Ohio Valley Conference football standings
| | Conf. | | | | | Overall |
| Team | W | | L | | T | W | | L | | T |
|---|---|---|---|---|---|---|---|---|---|---|
| No. 1 Eastern Kentucky $^ | 7 | – | 0 | – | 0 | 13 | – | 0 | – | 0 |
| Akron | 5 | – | 2 | – | 0 | 6 | – | 5 | – | 0 |
| Middle Tennessee | 4 | – | 3 | – | 0 | 8 | – | 3 | – | 0 |
| Youngstown State | 4 | – | 3 | – | 0 | 6 | – | 5 | – | 0 |
| Morehead State | 2 | – | 5 | – | 0 | 5 | – | 6 | – | 0 |
| Murray State | 2 | – | 5 | – | 0 | 4 | – | 7 | – | 0 |
| Austin Peay | 2 | – | 5 | – | 0 | 3 | – | 7 | – | 0 |
| Tennessee Tech | 1 | – | 6 | – | 0 | 3 | – | 8 | – | 0 |
$ – Conference champion; ^ – NCAA Division I-AA playoff participant; Rankings from NCAA Division I-AA Football Committee poll

The 1982 Middle Tennessee Blue Raiders football team represented Middle Tennessee State University in the 1982 NCAA Division I-AA football season

== Schedule ==
| Date | Opponent | Site | Result | Attendance | Source |
|---|---|---|---|---|---|
| September 4 | at Savannah State* | Ted Wright Stadium; Savannah, GA | W 12–3 | 2,000 | |
| September 11 | Elizabeth City State* | Johnny "Red" Floyd Stadium; Murfreesboro, TN | W 34–0 | 7,500 | |
| September 18 | Liberty Baptist* | Johnny "Red" Floyd Stadium; Murfreesboro, TN | W 27-7 | 4,000 | |
| September 25 | Morehead State | Johnny "Red" Floyd Stadium; Murfreesboro, TN | W 30–0 | 5,000 | |
| October 2 | Akron | Johnny "Red" Floyd Stadium; Murfreesboro, TN | L 16–19 | 7,500 | |
| October 9 | at No. 1 Eastern Kentucky | Hanger Field; Richmond, KY | L 10–35 | 17,700 | |
| October 16 | at Murray State | Roy Stewart Stadium; Murray, KY | W 27–9 | 12,500 | |
| October 23 | Austin Peay^{†} | Johnny "Red" Floyd Stadium; Murfreesboro, TN | W 24–7 | 10,000 | |
| October 30 | at Youngstown State | Stambaugh Stadium; Youngstown, OH | L 10–11 | 7,014 | |
| November 6 | at Western Kentucky* | L. T. Smith Stadium; Bowling Green, KY (rivalry) | W 31–16 | 8,500 | |
| November 20 | at Tennessee Tech | Tucker Stadium; Cookeville, TN | W 10–3 | 6,819 | |
*Non-conference game; ^{†}Homecoming; Rankings from NCAA Division I-AA Football Committee Poll released prior to the game

== After the season ==
=== NFL draft ===
The following Blue Raider was selected in the National Football League draft following the season.

| Round | Pick | Player | Position | NFL club |
|---|---|---|---|---|
| 7 | 193 | James Griffin | Defensive back | Cincinnati Bengals |
