= 1982 Ball State Cardinals football team =

American college football season

1982 Ball State Cardinals football
- Conference: Mid-American Conference
- Record: 5–6 (4–4 MAC)
- Head coach: Dwight Wallace (5th season)
- Home stadium: Ball State Stadium

1982 Mid-American Conference football standings
	Conf.					Overall
Team	W		L		T	W		L		T
Bowling Green $	7	–	2	–	0	7	–	5	–	0
Western Michigan	5	–	2	–	2	7	–	2	–	2
Miami (OH)	5	–	3	–	0	7	–	4	–	0
Central Michigan	5	–	3	–	1	6	–	4	–	1
Ohio	5	–	4	–	0	6	–	5	–	0
Toledo	5	–	4	–	0	6	–	5	–	0
Northern Illinois	5	–	4	–	0	5	–	5	–	0
Ball State	4	–	4	–	0	5	–	6	–	0
Eastern Michigan	1	–	7	–	1	1	–	9	–	1
Kent State	0	–	9	–	0	0	–	11	–	0
$ – Conference champion; The conference was a hybrid of NCAA Division I-A and I-AA programs. Central Michigan and Toledo were I-A while the other teams were classified as I-AA for the 1982 season only.

The 1982 Ball State Cardinals football team was an American football team that represented Ball State University in the Mid-American Conference (MAC) during the 1982 NCAA Division I-AA football season. In its fifth season under head coach Dwight Wallace, the team compiled a 5–6 record (4–4 against MAC opponents) and finished in eighth place out of ten teams in the conference. The team played its home games at Ball State Stadium in Muncie, Indiana.

The team's statistical leaders included Doug Freed with 989 passing yards, Terry Lymon with 635 rushing yards, Frank Kurth with 295 receiving yards, and Dane Fellmeth with 34 points scored.

== Schedule ==
Date	Time	Opponent	Site	Result	Attendance	Source
September 11	1:30 p.m.	Toledo	Ball State Stadium; Muncie, IN	L 14–31	15,423	
September 18	8:30 p.m.	at Wichita State*	Cessna Stadium; Wichita, KS	L 20–33	24,911	
September 25		Indiana State*	Ball State Stadium; Muncie, IN (rivalry)	L 0–17	11,375	
October 2	7:30 p.m.	at Northern Illinois	Huskie Stadium; DeKalb, IL (rivalry)	W 14–7	23,563	
October 9	2:00 p.m.	Ohio	Ball State Stadium; Muncie, IN	L 7–34	14,600	
October 16	1:04 p.m.	at Kent State	Dix Stadium; Kent, OH	W 21–3	6,812	
October 23	1:30 p.m.	Western Michigan	Ball State Stadium; Muncie, IN	W 13–6	15,700	
October 30	1:30 p.m.	at Eastern Michigan	Rynearson Stadium; Ypsilanti, MI	W 16–7	10,129	
November 6	1:30 p.m.	at Bowling Green	Doyt Perry Stadium; Bowling Green, OH	L 7–28	21,400–21,404	
November 13		at Central Michigan	Perry Shorts Stadium; Mount Pleasant, MI	L 13–24	16,582	
November 20		Illinois State*	Ball State Stadium; Muncie, IN	W 52–17	4,200	
*Non-conference game; All times are in Eastern time
