= 1982 Drake Bulldogs football team =

American college football season

1982 Drake Bulldogs football
- Conference: Missouri Valley Conference
- Record: 4–7 (2–4 MVC)
- Head coach: Chuck Shelton (6th season)
- Home stadium: Drake Stadium

1982 Missouri Valley Conference football standings
	Conf.					Overall
Team	W		L		T	W		L		T
Tulsa $	6	–	0	–	0	10	–	1	–	0
Wichita State	4	–	1	–	0	8	–	3	–	0
Southern Illinois	4	–	1	–	0	6	–	5	–	0
Indiana State	3	–	2	–	0	5	–	6	–	0
Drake	2	–	4	–	0	4	–	7	–	0
New Mexico State	1	–	4	–	0	3	–	8	–	0
West Texas State	1	–	4	–	0	3	–	8	–	0
Illinois State	0	–	5	–	0	2	–	9	–	0
$ – Conference champion; The conference was a hybrid of NCAA Division I-A and I-AA programs. New Mexico State, Tulsa, and Wichita State were I-A and the other teams were I-AA.

The 1982 Drake Bulldogs football team represented the Drake University as a member of the Missouri Valley Conference (MVC) during the 1982 NCAA Division I-AA football season. Led by sixth-year head coach Chuck Shelton, Drake compiled an overall record of 4–7 with a mark of 2–4 in conference play, and finished fifth in the MVC.

== Schedule ==
Date	Time	Opponent	Site	Result	Attendance	Source
September 4		Northern Iowa*	Drake Stadium; Des Moines, IA	W 40–13	16,650	
September 11		Idaho State*	Drake Stadium; Des Moines, IA	L 21–41	13,147	
September 18		at Southern Illinois	McAndrew Stadium; Carbondale, IL	L 17–24	13,300	
September 25		at Iowa State*	Cyclone Stadium; Ames, IA	L 10–35	51,866	
October 2		Indiana State	Drake Stadium; Des Moines, IA	L 19–29	10,084	
October 9		at Western Illinois*	Hanson Field; Macomb, IL	W 31–12	5,641	
October 16		at Nebraska–Omaha*	Al F. Caniglia Field; Omaha, NE	L 17–27	7,100	
October 23		Tulsa	Drake Stadium; Des Moines, IA	L 18–34	12,820	
October 30		at West Texas State	Kimbrough Memorial Stadium; Canyon, TX	W 31–24	10,091	
November 6	1:00 p.m.	Wichita State	Drake Stadium; Des Moines, IA	L 29–38	7,810	
November 13		at Illinois State	Hancock Stadium; Normal, IL	W 42–35	2,687	
*Non-conference game; All times are in Central time
