= 1982 Toledo Rockets football team =

American college football season

1982 Toledo Rockets football
- Conference: Mid-American Conference
- Record: 6–5 (5–4 MAC)
- Head coach: Dan Simrell (1st season)
- Offensive coordinator: Fred Jackson (1st season)
- Home stadium: Glass Bowl

1982 Mid-American Conference football standings
	Conf.					Overall
Team	W		L		T	W		L		T
Bowling Green $	7	–	2	–	0	7	–	5	–	0
Western Michigan	5	–	2	–	2	7	–	2	–	2
Miami (OH)	5	–	3	–	0	7	–	4	–	0
Central Michigan	5	–	3	–	1	6	–	4	–	1
Ohio	5	–	4	–	0	6	–	5	–	0
Toledo	5	–	4	–	0	6	–	5	–	0
Northern Illinois	5	–	4	–	0	5	–	5	–	0
Ball State	4	–	4	–	0	5	–	6	–	0
Eastern Michigan	1	–	7	–	1	1	–	9	–	1
Kent State	0	–	9	–	0	0	–	11	–	0
$ – Conference champion; The conference was a hybrid of NCAA Division I-A and I-AA programs. Central Michigan and Toledo were I-A while the other teams were classified as I-AA for the 1982 season only.

The 1982 Toledo Rockets football team was an American football team that represented the University of Toledo in the Mid-American Conference (MAC) during the 1982 NCAA Division I-A football season. In their first season under head coach Dan Simrell, the Rockets compiled a 6–5 record (5–4 against MAC opponents), finished in a tie for fifth place in the MAC, and outscored all opponents by a combined total of 184 to 162.

The team's statistical leaders included Jim Kelso with 1,963 passing yards, Steve Morgan with 567 rushing yards, Capus Robinson with 709 receiving yards, and Tony Lee with 64 points scored. Marlin Russell, Darryl Meadows, Steve Schafer, and Mike Russell were the team captains.

== Schedule ==
Date	Time	Opponent	Site	Result	Attendance	Source
September 4	7:30 p.m.	Northern Illinois	Glass Bowl; Toledo, OH	W 9–3	20,106–25,106	
September 11	1:30 p.m.	at Ball State	Ball State Stadium; Muncie, IN	W 31–14	15,423	
September 18	7:30 p.m.	Marshall*	Glass Bowl; Toledo, OH	W 17–9	21,319	
September 25	2:30 p.m.	at Wisconsin*	Camp Randall Stadium; Madison, WI	L 27–36	73,317	
October 2	1:30 p.m.	at Ohio	Peden Stadium; Athens, OH	L 14–17	19,800	
October 9	7:30 p.m.	Eastern Michigan	Glass Bowl; Toledo, OH	W 20–19	22,827	
October 16	1:31 p.m.	at Central Michigan	Perry Shorts Stadium; Mount Pleasant, MI	L 12–16	18,321	
October 23	7:30 p.m.	Bowling Green	Glass Bowl; Toledo, OH (rivalry)	W 24–10	31,369	
October 30	1:34 p.m.	at Miami (OH)	Miami Field; Oxford, OH	L 17–21	22,639	
November 6	1:30 p.m.	Western Michigan	Glass Bowl; Toledo, OH	L 10–17	22,423	
November 13	1:02 p.m.	at Kent State	Dix Stadium; Kent, OH	W 3–0	4,400	
*Non-conference game; All times are in Eastern time

== After the season ==
=== NFL draft ===
The following Rocket was selected in the 1983 NFL draft following the season.

Round	Pick	Player	Position	NFL club
9	239	Rod Achter	Wide receiver	Minnesota Vikings
