= Emory Hale (American football) =

American football coach

Coaching career (HC unless noted)
- 1961–1965: Science Hill HS (TN) (DB)
- 1966–1967: East Tennessee State (OB)
- 1968: East Tennessee State (OC)
- 1969–1980: Oak Ridge HS (TN)
- 1981–1987: Austin Peay

Head coaching record
- Overall: 33–42 (college)

Emory Hale is an American former football coach. He served as the head football coach at Austin Peay State University from 1981 to 1987, compiling a record of 33–42.

== Head coaching record ==
Year	Team	Overall	Conference	Standing	Bowl/playoffs
Austin Peay Governors (Ohio Valley Conference) (1981–1987)
1981	Austin Peay	5–5	3–5	8th	
1982	Austin Peay	3–7	2–5	T–5th	
1983	Austin Peay	6–5	3–4	5th	
1984	Austin Peay	7–4	4–3	5th	
1985	Austin Peay	5–6	2–5	6th	
1986	Austin Peay	5–6	3–4	T–5th	
1987	Austin Peay	2–9	1–5	T–6th	
Austin Peay:		33–42	18–31		
Total:		33–42			
