= 1982 Southern Illinois Salukis football team =

American college football season

1982 Southern Illinois Salukis football
- Conference: Missouri Valley Conference
- Record: 6–5 (4–1 MVC)
- Head coach: Rey Dempsey (7th season)
- Home stadium: McAndrew Stadium

1982 Missouri Valley Conference football standings
	Conf.					Overall
Team	W		L		T	W		L		T
Tulsa $	6	–	0	–	0	10	–	1	–	0
Wichita State	4	–	1	–	0	8	–	3	–	0
Southern Illinois	4	–	1	–	0	6	–	5	–	0
Indiana State	3	–	2	–	0	5	–	6	–	0
Drake	2	–	4	–	0	4	–	7	–	0
New Mexico State	1	–	4	–	0	3	–	8	–	0
West Texas State	1	–	4	–	0	3	–	8	–	0
Illinois State	0	–	5	–	0	2	–	9	–	0
$ – Conference champion; The conference was a hybrid of NCAA Division I-A and I-AA programs. New Mexico State, Tulsa, and Wichita State were I-A and the other teams were I-AA.

The 1982 Southern Illinois Salukis football team was an American football team that represented Southern Illinois University in the Missouri Valley Conference (MVC) during the 1982 NCAA Division I-AA football season. Under seventh-year head coach Rey Dempsey, the team compiled a 6–5 record. The team played its home games at McAndrew Stadium in Carbondale, Illinois.

== Schedule ==
Date	Opponent	Site	Result	Attendance	Source
September 4	at Western Illinois*	Hanson Field; Macomb, IL	W 38–7	8,500	
September 11	at Illinois State	Hancock Stadium; Normal, IL	W 16–0	12,289	
September 18	Drake	McAndrew Stadium; Carbondale, IL	W 24–17	13,300	
September 25	Arkansas State*	McAndrew Stadium; Carbondale, IL	L 30–35	15,600	
October 2	at Southwestern Louisiana*	Cajun Field; Lafayette, LA	L 10–20	22,359	
October 9	at Florida State*	Doak Campbell Stadium; Tallahassee, FL	L 8–59	51,233	
October 16	at Tulsa	Skelly Stadium; Tulsa, OK	L 3–22	26,936	
October 23	Indiana State	McAndrew Stadium; Carbondale, IL	W 21–9	14,200	
October 30	at Eastern Illinois*	O'Brien Field; Charleston, IL	L 7–20	9,120	
November 13	Southwest Missouri State*	McAndrew Stadium; Carbondale, IL	W 28–7	5,200	
November 20	West Texas State	McAndrew Stadium; Carbondale, IL	W 17–13	1,000	
*Non-conference game
