= 1981 Western Kentucky Hilltoppers football team =

American college football season

1981 Western Kentucky Hilltoppers football
- Conference: Ohio Valley Conference
- Record: 6–5 (4–4 OVC)
- Head coach: Jimmy Feix (14th season)
- Captains: Greg Gallas; Troy Snardon; Lamont Meacham
- Home stadium: Houchens Industries–L. T. Smith Stadium

1981 Ohio Valley Conference football standings
	Conf.					Overall
Team	W		L		T	W		L		T
No. 1 Eastern Kentucky $^	8	–	0	–	0	12	–	2	–	0
No. 9 Murray State	5	–	3	–	0	8	–	3	–	0
Youngstown State	5	–	3	–	0	7	–	4	–	0
Tennessee Tech	4	–	4	–	0	6	–	5	–	0
Middle Tennessee	4	–	4	–	0	6	–	5	–	0
Western Kentucky	4	–	4	–	0	6	–	5	–	0
Akron	4	–	4	–	0	5	–	5	–	0
Austin Peay	3	–	5	–	0	5	–	5	–	0
Morehead State	0	–	8	–	0	1	–	9	–	0
$ – Conference champion; ^ – NCAA Division I-AA playoff participant; Rankings from NCAA Division I-AA Football Committee poll

The 1981 Western Kentucky Hilltoppers football team represented Western Kentucky University as a member of the Ohio Valley Conference during the 1981 NCAA Division I-AA football season. Led by 14th-year head coach Jimmy Feix, the Hilltoppers compiled an overall record of 6–5 with a mark of 4–4 on conference play, tying for fourth in the OVC. The team's captains were Greg Gallas, Troy Snardon, Lamont Meacham.

== Schedule ==
Date	Opponent	Site	Result	Attendance	Source
September 5	at Evansville*	Reitz Bowl; Evansville, IN	W 35–7	6,100	
September 12	Delaware*	L. T. Smith Stadium; Bowling Green, KY	L 14–38	13,000	
September 19	Kentucky State*	L. T. Smith Stadium; Bowling Green, KY	W 54–14	10,000	
September 26	at Austin Peay	Municipal Stadium; Clarksville, TN	W 28–0	8,000	
October 10	at Youngstown State	Rayen Stadium; Youngstown, OH	W 35–14	4,029	
October 17	Tennessee Tech	L. T. Smith Stadium; Bowling Green, KY	L 3–14	11,500	
October 24	at No. T–1 Eastern Kentucky	Hanger Field; Richmond, KY (Battle of the Bluegrass)	L 11–19	20,800	
October 31	Morehead State^{†}	L. T. Smith Stadium; Bowling Green, KY	W 19–15	17,000	
November 7	at Akron	Rubber Bowl; Akron, OH	W 19–14	6,002	
November 14	at Middle Tennessee	Johnny "Red" Floyd Stadium; Murfreesboro, TN (rivalry)	L 17–31	3,500	
November 21	Murray State	L. T. Smith Stadium; Bowling Green, KY (Battle for the Red Belt)	L 6–38	8,500	
*Non-conference game; ^{†}Homecoming; Rankings from NCAA Division I-AA Football Committee Poll released prior to the game
