= 1981 Morehead State Eagles football team =

American college football season

1981 Morehead State Eagles football
- Conference: Ohio Valley Conference
- Record: 1–9 (0–8 OVC)
- Head coach: Steve Loney (1st season)
- Home stadium: Jayne Stadium

1981 Ohio Valley Conference football standings
	Conf.					Overall
Team	W		L		T	W		L		T
No. 1 Eastern Kentucky $^	8	–	0	–	0	12	–	2	–	0
No. 9 Murray State	5	–	3	–	0	8	–	3	–	0
Youngstown State	5	–	3	–	0	7	–	4	–	0
Tennessee Tech	4	–	4	–	0	6	–	5	–	0
Middle Tennessee	4	–	4	–	0	6	–	5	–	0
Western Kentucky	4	–	4	–	0	6	–	5	–	0
Akron	4	–	4	–	0	5	–	5	–	0
Austin Peay	3	–	5	–	0	5	–	5	–	0
Morehead State	0	–	8	–	0	1	–	9	–	0
$ – Conference champion; ^ – NCAA Division I-AA playoff participant; Rankings from NCAA Division I-AA Football Committee poll

The 1981 Morehead State Eagles football team represented Morehead State University as a member of the Ohio Valley Conference (OVC) during the 1981 NCAA Division I-AA football season. Led by first-year head coach Steve Loney, the Eagles compiled an overall record of 1–9, with a mark of 0–8 in conference play, and finished last in the OVC.

== Schedule ==
Date	Opponent	Site	Result	Attendance	Source
September 12	at Marshall*	Fairfield Stadium; Huntington, WV	L 17–20	18,212	
September 26	Middle Tennessee	Jayne Stadium; Morehead, KY	L 7–20	7,500	
October 3	at No. 2 Murray State	Roy Stewart Stadium; Murray, KY	L 7–20	9,500	
October 10	Austin Peay	Jayne Stadium; Morehead, KY	L 28–42	8,000	
October 17	at Akron	Rubber Bowl; Akron, OH	L 14–31		
October 24	at Tennessee Tech	Tucker Stadium; Cookeville, TN	L 17–35	12,110	
October 31	at Western Kentucky	L. T. Smith Stadium; Bowling Green, KY	L 15–19	17,000	
November 7	Liberty Baptist*	Jayne Stadium; Morehead, KY	W 34–10	2,500	
November 14	Youngstown State	Jayne Stadium; Morehead, KY	L 7–38		
November 21	No. 1 Eastern Kentucky	Jayne Stadium; Morehead, KY (rivalry)	L 17–21		
*Non-conference game; Rankings from NCAA Division I-AA Football Committee Poll released prior to the game
