= 1981 Austin Peay Governors football team =

American college football season

1981 Austin Peay Governors football
- Conference: Ohio Valley Conference
- Record: 5–5 (3–5 OVC)
- Head coach: Emory Hale (1st season)
- Home stadium: Municipal Stadium

1981 Ohio Valley Conference football standings
	Conf.					Overall
Team	W		L		T	W		L		T
No. 1 Eastern Kentucky $^	8	–	0	–	0	12	–	2	–	0
No. 9 Murray State	5	–	3	–	0	8	–	3	–	0
Youngstown State	5	–	3	–	0	7	–	4	–	0
Tennessee Tech	4	–	4	–	0	6	–	5	–	0
Middle Tennessee	4	–	4	–	0	6	–	5	–	0
Western Kentucky	4	–	4	–	0	6	–	5	–	0
Akron	4	–	4	–	0	5	–	5	–	0
Austin Peay	3	–	5	–	0	5	–	5	–	0
Morehead State	0	–	8	–	0	1	–	9	–	0
$ – Conference champion; ^ – NCAA Division I-AA playoff participant; Rankings from NCAA Division I-AA Football Committee poll

The 1981 Austin Peay Governors football team represented Austin Peay State University as a member of the Ohio Valley Conference (OVC) during the 1981 NCAA Division I-AA football season. Led by first-year head coach Emory Hale, the Governors compiled an overall record of 5–5, with a mark of 3–5 in conference play, and finished eighth in the OVC.

== Schedule ==
Date	Opponent	Site	Result	Attendance	Source
September 12	Kentucky State*	Municipal Stadium; Clarksville, TN	W 24–14		
September 19	at James Madison	JMU Stadium; Harrisonburg, VA	W 13–7	8,000	
September 26	Western Kentucky	Municipal Stadium; Clarksville, TN	L 0–28	8,000	
October 3	at No. 5 Eastern Kentucky	Hanger Field; Richmond, KY	L 14–41		
October 10	at Morehead State	Jayne Stadium; Morehead, KY	W 42–28	8,000	
October 24	Middle Tennessee	Municipal Stadium; Clarksville, TN	W 14–9	8,750	
October 31	Akron	Municipal Stadium; Clarksville, TN	L 19–23	4,750	
November 7	at Murray State	Roy Stewart Stadium; Murray, KY	L 29–34	7,800	
November 14	at Tennessee Tech	Tucker Stadium; Cookeville, TN	L 24–29		
November 21	Tennessee–Martin*	Municipal Stadium; Clarksville, TN	W 28–14		
*Non-conference game; Rankings from NCAA Division I-AA Football Committee Poll released prior to the game
