= 1982 Southwest Missouri State Bears football team =

American college football season

1982 Southwest Missouri State Bears football
- Conference: Association of Mid-Continent Universities
- Record: 5–6 (1–2 Mid-Con)
- Head coach: Rich Johanningmeier (7th season)
- Captains: Darrin Newbold; Keith Odehnal
- Home stadium: Briggs Stadium

1982 Association of Mid-Continent Universities football standings
	Conf.					Overall
Team	W		L		T	W		L		T
No. 5 Eastern Illinois +^	2	–	0	–	1	11	–	1	–	1
Northern Iowa +	2	–	0	–	1	4	–	6	–	1
Southwest Missouri State	1	–	2	–	0	5	–	6	–	0
Western Illinois	0	–	3	–	0	2	–	8	–	0
+ – Conference co-champions; ^ – NCAA Division I-AA playoff participant; Rankings from NCAA Division I-AA Football Committee poll

The 1982 Southwest Missouri State Bears football team represented Southwest Missouri State University (now known as Missouri State University) as a member of the Association of Mid-Continent Universities (Mid-Con) during the 1982 NCAA Division I-AA football season. Led by seventh-year head coach Rich Johanningmeier, the Bears compiled an overall record of 5–6, with a mark of 1–2 in conference play, and finished third in the Mid-Con.

== Schedule ==
Date	Opponent	Site	Result	Attendance	Source
September 4	at North Alabama*	Braly Municipal Stadium; Florence, AL	L 3–17	8,000	
September 11	at Northern Iowa	UNI-Dome; Cedar Falls, IA	L 0–10	11,715	
September 18	at Harding*	Alumni Stadium; Searcy, AR	W 10–7	4,200	
September 25	Lincoln (MO)*	Briggs Stadium; Springfield, MO	W 51–3	7,200	
October 2	at Southeast Missouri State*	Houck Stadium; Cape Girardeau, MO	W 44–26	8,500	
October 9	Central Missouri State*^{†}	Briggs Stadium; Springfield, MO	W 21–3	7,200	
October 16	Western Illinois	Briggs Stadium; Springfield, MO	W 35–16	4,100	
October 23	at Murray State*	Roy Stewart Stadium; Murray, KY	L 17–21	6,500	
October 30	No. 15 Nicholls State*	Briggs Stadium; Springfield, MO	L 19–30	3,900	
November 6	No. 6 Eastern Illinois	Briggs Stadium; Springfield, MO	L 7–36	3,200	
November 13	at Southern Illinois*	McAndrew Stadium; Carbondale, IL	L 7–28	5,200	
*Non-conference game; ^{†}Homecoming; Rankings from NCAA Division I-AA Football Committee Poll released prior to the game
