= 1982 Murray State Racers football team =

American college football season

1982 Murray State Racers football
- Conference: Ohio Valley Conference
- Record: 4–7 (2–5 OVC)
- Head coach: Frank Beamer (2nd season)
- Defensive coordinator: Mike Mahoney (2nd season)
- Home stadium: Roy Stewart Stadium

1982 Ohio Valley Conference football standings
	Conf.					Overall
Team	W		L		T	W		L		T
No. 1 Eastern Kentucky $^	7	–	0	–	0	13	–	0	–	0
Akron	5	–	2	–	0	6	–	5	–	0
Middle Tennessee	4	–	3	–	0	8	–	3	–	0
Youngstown State	4	–	3	–	0	6	–	5	–	0
Morehead State	2	–	5	–	0	5	–	6	–	0
Murray State	2	–	5	–	0	4	–	7	–	0
Austin Peay	2	–	5	–	0	3	–	7	–	0
Tennessee Tech	1	–	6	–	0	3	–	8	–	0
$ – Conference champion; ^ – NCAA Division I-AA playoff participant; Rankings from NCAA Division I-AA Football Committee poll

The 1982 Murray State Racers football team represented Murray State University during the 1982 NCAA Division I-AA football season. Led by second-year head coach Frank Beamer, the Racers compiled an overall record of 4–7 with a mark of 2–5 in conference play, and finished tied for fifth in the OVC.

== Schedule ==
Date	Opponent	Site	Result	Attendance	Source
September 4	Southeast Missouri State*	Roy Stewart Stadium; Murray, KY	W 16–6	10,500	
September 18	Central Missouri State*	Roy Stewart Stadium; Murray, KY	L 0–10	8,500	
September 25	at Tennessee Tech	Tucker Stadium; Cookeville, TN	L 3–10	8,217	
October 2	at Morehead State	Jayne Stadium; Morehead, KY	L 10–13	4,000	
October 9	Tennessee–Martin*	Roy Stewart Stadium; Murray, KY	L 7–10	9,500	
October 16	Middle Tennessee	Roy Stewart Stadium; Murray, KY	L 9–27	12,500	
October 23	Southwest Missouri State*	Roy Stewart Stadium; Murray, KY	W 21–17	6,500	
October 28	at No. 1 Eastern Kentucky	Hanger Field; Richmond, KY	L 20–21	18,100	
November 6	at Austin Peay	Municipal Stadium; Clarksville, TN	W 21–7	7,500	
November 13	Akron	Roy Stewart Stadium; Murray, KY	W 16–14	3,500	
November 20	Western Kentucky*	Roy Stewart Stadium; Murray, KY (rivalry)	L 20–27	4,500	
*Non-conference game; Rankings from NCAA Division I-AA Football Committee Poll released prior to the game
