= 1982 Tennessee Tech Golden Eagles football team =

American college football season

1982 Tennessee Tech Golden Eagles football
- Conference: Ohio Valley Conference
- Record: 3–8 (1–6 OVC)
- Head coach: Don Wade (15th season)
- Home stadium: Tucker Stadium

1982 Ohio Valley Conference football standings
	Conf.					Overall
Team	W		L		T	W		L		T
No. 1 Eastern Kentucky $^	7	–	0	–	0	13	–	0	–	0
Akron	5	–	2	–	0	6	–	5	–	0
Middle Tennessee	4	–	3	–	0	8	–	3	–	0
Youngstown State	4	–	3	–	0	6	–	5	–	0
Morehead State	2	–	5	–	0	5	–	6	–	0
Murray State	2	–	5	–	0	4	–	7	–	0
Austin Peay	2	–	5	–	0	3	–	7	–	0
Tennessee Tech	1	–	6	–	0	3	–	8	–	0
$ – Conference champion; ^ – NCAA Division I-AA playoff participant; Rankings from NCAA Division I-AA Football Committee poll

The 1982 Tennessee Tech Golden Eagles football team represented Tennessee Technological University (commonly referred to as Tennessee Tech) as a member of the Ohio Valley Conference (OVC) during the 1982 NCAA Division I-AA football season. Led by 15th-year head coach Don Wade, the Golden Eagles compiled an overall record of 3–8, with a mark of 1–6 in conference play, and finished last in the OVC.

== Schedule ==
Date	Opponent	Site	Result	Attendance	Source
September 4	East Tennessee State*	Tucker Stadium; Cookeville, TN	W 14–0	8,170	
September 11	at Western Carolina*	E. J. Whitmire Stadium; Cullowhee, NC	W 17–10	8,540	
September 18	at Youngstown State	Stambaugh Stadium; Youngstown, OH	L 14–37	8,441	
September 25	Murray State	Tucker Stadium; Cookeville, TN	W 10–3	8,217	
October 2	at Tennessee–Martin*	Pacer Stadium; Martin, TN	L 21–35	6,750	
October 16	Western Kentucky*	Tucker Stadium; Cookeville, TN	L 14–28	13,859	
October 23	at Morehead State	Jayne Stadium; Morehead, KY	L 14–38	2,500	
October 30	at Akron	Rubber Bowl; Akron, OH	L 12–28	7,126	
November 6	No. 1 Eastern Kentucky	Tucker Stadium; Cookeville, TN	L 17–34	4,042	
November 13	at Austin Peay	Municipal Stadium; Clarksville, TN	L 27–31	3,000	
November 20	Middle Tennessee	Tucker Stadium; Cookeville, TN	L 3–10	6,819	
*Non-conference game; Rankings from NCAA Division I-AA Football Committee Poll released prior to the game
