= 1982 Western Illinois Leathernecks football team =

American college football season

1982 Western Illinois Leathernecks football
- Conference: Association of Mid-Continent Universities
- Record: 2–8 (0–3 Mid-Con)
- Head coach: Pete Rodriguez (4th season)
- Home stadium: Hanson Field

1982 Association of Mid-Continent Universities football standings
	Conf.					Overall
Team	W		L		T	W		L		T
No. 5 Eastern Illinois +^	2	–	0	–	1	11	–	1	–	1
Northern Iowa +	2	–	0	–	1	4	–	6	–	1
Southwest Missouri State	1	–	2	–	0	5	–	6	–	0
Western Illinois	0	–	3	–	0	2	–	8	–	0
+ – Conference co-champions; ^ – NCAA Division I-AA playoff participant; Rankings from NCAA Division I-AA Football Committee poll

The 1982 Western Illinois Leathernecks football team represented Western Illinois University as a member of the Association of Mid-Continent Universities (Mid-Con) during the 1982 NCAA Division I-AA football season. Led by fourth-year head coach Pete Rodriguez, the Leathernecks compiled an overall record of 2–8, with a mark of 0–3 in conference play, and finished fourth in the Mid-Con.

== Schedule ==
Date	Opponent	Site	Result	Attendance	Source
September 4	Southern Illinois*	Hanson Field; Macomb, IL	L 7–38	8,500	
September 18	Illinois State*	Hanson Field; Macomb, IL	W 29–13	9,231	
September 25	Northeast Missouri State*	Hanson Field; Macomb, IL	L 10–27	10,657	
October 2	at Northern Iowa	UNI-Dome; Cedar Falls, IA	L 9–21	8,707	
October 9	Drake*	Hanson Field; Macomb, IL	L 12–31	5,641	
October 16	at Southwest Missouri State	Briggs Stadium; Springfield, MO	L 16–35	4,100	
October 23	No. 11 Eastern Illinois	Hanson Field; Macomb, IL	L 7–31	10,399	
October 30	at Northern Michigan*	Memorial Field; Marquette, MI	L 7–22	3,004	
November 6	Youngstown State*	Hanson Field; Macomb, IL	L 20–28	5,849	
November 13	at Howard*	Howard Stadium; Washington, DC	W 22–17	1,200	
*Non-conference game; Rankings from NCAA Division I-AA Football Committee Poll released prior to the game
