= 1982 Tulsa Golden Hurricane football team =

American college football season

1982 Tulsa Golden Hurricane football

MVC champion
- Conference: Missouri Valley Conference
- Record: 10–1 (6–0 MVC)
- Head coach: John Cooper (6th season)
- Offensive coordinator: Larry Coker (3rd season)
- Defensive coordinator: Mike Knoll (3rd season)
- Home stadium: Skelly Stadium

1982 Missouri Valley Conference football standings
	Conf.					Overall
Team	W		L		T	W		L		T
Tulsa $	6	–	0	–	0	10	–	1	–	0
Wichita State	4	–	1	–	0	8	–	3	–	0
Southern Illinois	4	–	1	–	0	6	–	5	–	0
Indiana State	3	–	2	–	0	5	–	6	–	0
Drake	2	–	4	–	0	4	–	7	–	0
New Mexico State	1	–	4	–	0	3	–	8	–	0
West Texas State	1	–	4	–	0	3	–	8	–	0
Illinois State	0	–	5	–	0	2	–	9	–	0
$ – Conference champion; The conference was a hybrid of NCAA Division I-A and I-AA programs. New Mexico State, Tulsa, and Wichita State were I-A and the other teams were I-AA.

The 1982 Tulsa Golden Hurricane football team represented the University of Tulsa during the 1982 NCAA Division I-A football season. In their sixth year under head coach John Cooper, the Golden Hurricane compiled a 10–1 record (6–0 against conference opponents) and won the Missouri Valley Conference (MVC) championship. The team defeated Big Eight Conference opponents Oklahoma State (25–15) and Kansas (20–15), but lost to Southwest Conference opponent Arkansas (38–0).

The team had two running backs who each rushed for over 1,000 yards during the 1982 season. Mike Gunter totaled 1,464 rushing yards, 11 touchdowns, and 7.5 yards per carry, while Ken Lacy rushed for 1,097 yards and 12 touchdowns with an average of 5.5 yards per carry. Quarterback Skip Ast accumulated 595 passing yards and 367 rushing yards. Head coach John Cooper was later inducted into the College Football Hall of Fame.

Despite a glowing 10-1 record and a top 20 ranking in both major polls at the end of the regular season, they were not invited to participate in a bowl game.

== Schedule ==
Date	Time	Opponent	Rank	Site	Result	Attendance	Source
September 4	6:35 p.m.	Air Force*		Skelly Stadium; Tulsa, OK	W 35–17	29,811	
September 11		at No. 13 Arkansas*		Razorback Stadium; Fayetteville, AR	L 0–38	43,820	
September 19		Oklahoma State*^{†}		Skelly Stadium; Tulsa, OK (rivalry)	W 25–15	35,297	
October 2		at Kansas*		Memorial Stadium; Lawrence, KS	W 20–15	35,552	
October 9		at New Mexico State		Aggie Memorial Stadium; Las Cruces, NM	W 31–14	11,633	
October 16		Southern Illinois		Skelly Stadium; Tulsa, OK	W 22–3	26,936	
October 23		at Drake		Drake Stadium; Des Moines, IA	W 34–18	12,820	
October 30	1:30 p.m.	at Wichita State		Cessna Stadium; Wichita, KS	W 30–21	28,450	
November 6		West Texas State		Skelly Stadium; Tulsa, OK	W 59–21	25,803	
November 13		Indiana State		Skelly Stadium; Tulsa, OK	W 48–14	23,929	
November 20	1:32 p.m.	at North Texas State*	No. 20	Fouts Field; Denton, TX	W 38–20	8,500	
*Non-conference game; ^{†}Homecoming; Rankings from AP Poll released prior to the game; All times are in Central time

== After the season ==
=== 1983 NFL draft ===
The following Golden Hurricane players were selected in the 1983 NFL draft following the season.

Round	Pick	Player	Position	NFL club
5	113	Sid Abramowitz	Tackle	Baltimore Colts
12	328	Stu Crum	Kicker	New York Jets
