= Bill Narduzzi =

American football player and coach (1936–1988)

Biographical details
- Born: February 16, 1936
- Died: February 4, 1988 (aged 51); New York, New York, U.S.

Playing career
- 1957–1958: Miami (OH)
- Positions: End, guard, tackle

Coaching career (HC unless noted)
- 1962: Pittsburgh (GA)
- 1963–1964: Brown (ends)
- 1965–1968: Yale (ends)
- 1969–1971: Yale (DC)
- 1972: Miami (FL) (LB)
- 1973–1974: Kentucky (DC)
- 1975–1985: Youngstown State
- 1986–1987: Columbia (DC/LB)

Administrative career (AD unless noted)
- 1980–1983: Youngstown State

Head coaching record
- Overall: 68–51–1
- Tournaments: 3–2 (NCAA D-II playoffs)

Accomplishments and honors

Championships
- 2 Mid-Continent (1978–1979)

Awards
- OVC Coach of the Year (1984)

William E. Narduzzi (February 16, 1936 – February 4, 1988) was an American college football player and coach. He served as the head football coach at Youngstown State University from 1975 to 1985, compiling a record of 68–51–1. His son, Pat Narduzzi, is the current head football coach at the University of Pittsburgh.

He died on February 4, 1988, at the age of 51 after a relapse in Hodgkin's disease.

== Head coaching record ==
| Year | Team | Overall | Conference | Standing | Bowl/playoffs |
|---|---|---|---|---|---|
Youngstown State Penguins (NCAA Division II independent) (1975–1977)
| 1975 | Youngstown State | 5–4 | | | |
| 1976 | Youngstown State | 4–6 | | | |
| 1977 | Youngstown State | 7–3 | | | |
Youngstown State Penguins (Association of Mid-Continent Universities) (1978–1980)
| 1978 | Youngstown State | 10–2 | 5–0 | 1st | L NCAA Division II Semifinal |
| 1979 | Youngstown State | 11–2 | 5–0 | 1st | L NCAA Division II Championship |
| 1980 | Youngstown State | 2–8–1 | 1–3 | 4th | |
Youngstown State Penguins (Ohio Valley Conference) (1981–1985)
| 1981 | Youngstown State | 7–4 | 5–3 | T–2nd | |
| 1982 | Youngstown State | 6–5 | 4–3 | T–3rd | |
| 1983 | Youngstown State | 4–7 | 2–5 | T–6th | |
| 1984 | Youngstown State | 7–4 | 5–2 | T–2nd | |
| 1985 | Youngstown State | 5–6 | 4–3 | 5th | |
| Youngstown State: | | 68–51–1 | 31–19 | | |
| Total: | | 68–51–1 | | | |
National championship Conference title Conference division title or championship game berth
