= 1982 West Texas State Buffaloes football team =

American college football season

1982 West Texas State Buffaloes football
- Conference: Missouri Valley Conference
- Record: 3–8 (1–4 MVC)
- Head coach: Don Davis (1st season)
- Offensive coordinator: Jack Welch (1st season)
- Home stadium: Kimbrough Memorial Stadium

1982 Missouri Valley Conference football standings
	Conf.					Overall
Team	W		L		T	W		L		T
Tulsa $	6	–	0	–	0	10	–	1	–	0
Wichita State	4	–	1	–	0	8	–	3	–	0
Southern Illinois	4	–	1	–	0	6	–	5	–	0
Indiana State	3	–	2	–	0	5	–	6	–	0
Drake	2	–	4	–	0	4	–	7	–	0
New Mexico State	1	–	4	–	0	3	–	8	–	0
West Texas State	1	–	4	–	0	3	–	8	–	0
Illinois State	0	–	5	–	0	2	–	9	–	0
$ – Conference champion; The conference was a hybrid of NCAA Division I-A and I-AA programs. New Mexico State, Tulsa, and Wichita State were I-A and the other teams were I-AA.

The 1982 West Texas State Buffaloes football team was an American football team that represented West Texas State University—now known as West Texas A&M University—as a member of the Missouri Valley Conference (MVC) during the 1982 NCAA Division I-AA football season. In their first year under head coach Don Davis, the Buffaloes compiled an overall record of 3–8 record with a mark of 1–4 in conference play, tying for sixth place in the MVC.

== Schedule ==
Date	Time	Opponent	Site	Result	Attendance	Source
September 4		Abilene Christian*	Kimbrough Memorial Stadium; Canyon, TX	L 29–33	10,213	
September 11		at Louisiana Tech*	Joe Aillet Stadium; Ruston, LA	L 7–28	12,300	
September 18		at Southwestern Louisiana*	Cajun Field; Lafayette, LA	L 18–31	21,828	
September 25		McNeese State*	Kimbrough Memorial Stadium; Canyon, TX	W 25–17	12,333	
October 2	1:30 p.m.	Wichita State^{†}	Kimbrough Memorial Stadium; Canyon, TX	L 21–24	10,212–12,500	
October 16		at Florida*	Florida Field; Gainesville, FL	L 14–77	72,885	
October 23	1:30 p.m.	North Texas State*	Kimbrough Memorial Stadium; Canyon, TX	W 24–22	10,019	
October 30		Drake	Kimbrough Memorial Stadium; Canyon, TX	L 24–31	10,091	
November 6		at Tulsa	Skelly Stadium; Tulsa, OK	L 21–59	25,803	
November 13		New Mexico State	Kimbrough Memorial Stadium; Canyon, TX	W 30–28	7,114	
November 20		at Southern Illinois	McAndrew Stadium; Carbondale, IL	L 13–17	1,000	
*Non-conference game; ^{†}Homecoming; All times are in Central time
