= 1982 Wichita State Shockers football team =

American college football season

1982 Wichita State Shockers football
- Conference: Missouri Valley Conference
- Record: 8–3 (4–1 MVC)
- Head coach: Willie Jeffries (4th season)
- Offensive coordinator: Fayne Henson (1st season)
- Offensive scheme: Freeze option
- Defensive coordinator: Ben Blacknall (4th season)
- Base defense: 4–3
- Home stadium: Cessna Stadium

1982 Missouri Valley Conference football standings
	Conf.					Overall
Team	W		L		T	W		L		T
Tulsa $	6	–	0	–	0	10	–	1	–	0
Wichita State	4	–	1	–	0	8	–	3	–	0
Southern Illinois	4	–	1	–	0	6	–	5	–	0
Indiana State	3	–	2	–	0	5	–	6	–	0
Drake	2	–	4	–	0	4	–	7	–	0
New Mexico State	1	–	4	–	0	3	–	8	–	0
West Texas State	1	–	4	–	0	3	–	8	–	0
Illinois State	0	–	5	–	0	2	–	9	–	0
$ – Conference champion; The conference was a hybrid of NCAA Division I-A and I-AA programs. New Mexico State, Tulsa, and Wichita State were I-A and the other teams were I-AA.

The 1982 Wichita State Shockers football team was an American football team that represented Wichita State University (MVC) as a member of the Missouri Valley Conference during the 1982 NCAA Division I-A football season. In their fourth year under head coach Willie Jeffries, the Shockers compiled an overall record of 8–3 with a mark of 4–1 in conference play, tying for second place in the MVC. 1982 proved to be the final winning season for the Shocker football program. Wichita State went 3–8 in each of the following four seasons before the university ended sponsorship of football following the 1986 campaign.

== Schedule ==
Date	Time	Opponent	Site	Result	Attendance	Source
September 4	7:30 p.m.	Missouri–Rolla*	Cessna Stadium; Wichita, KS	W 51–14	20,120	
September 11	1:30 p.m.	at Kansas*	Memorial Stadium; Lawrence, KS	W 13–10	41,500	
September 18	7:30 p.m.	Ball State*	Cessna Stadium; Wichita, KS	W 33–20	24,911	
September 25	1:30 p.m.	at Kansas State*	KSU Stadium; Manhattan, KS	L 7–31	40,100	
October 2	1:30 p.m.	at West Texas State	Kimbrough Memorial Stadium; Canyon, TX	W 24–21	10,212–12,500	
October 9	1:30 p.m.	at Illinois State	Hancock Stadium; Normal, IL	W 48–14	11,061	
October 16	1:30 p.m.	New Mexico State	Cessna Stadium; Wichita, KS	W 28–26	23,500–23,506	
October 23	1:30 p.m.	UT Arlington*	Cessna Stadium; Wichita, KS	W 30–13	18,117	
October 30	1:30 p.m.	Tulsa	Cessna Stadium; Wichita, KS	L 21–30	28,450	
November 6	1:00 p.m.	at Drake	Drake Stadium; Des Moines, IA	W 38–29	7,810	
November 13	2:00 p.m.	at Wyoming*	War Memorial Stadium; Laramie, WY	L 20–24	8,713	
*Non-conference game; All times are in Central time
