= 1982 Eastern Kentucky Colonels football team =

American college football season

1982 Eastern Kentucky Colonels football

NCAA Division I-AA champion OVC champion

NCAA Division I-AA Championship Game, W 17–14 vs Delaware
- Conference: Ohio Valley Conference
- Record: 13–0 (7–0 OVC)
- Head coach: Roy Kidd (19th season)
- Home stadium: Hanger Field

1982 Ohio Valley Conference football standings
	Conf.					Overall
Team	W		L		T	W		L		T
No. 1 Eastern Kentucky $^	7	–	0	–	0	13	–	0	–	0
Akron	5	–	2	–	0	6	–	5	–	0
Middle Tennessee	4	–	3	–	0	8	–	3	–	0
Youngstown State	4	–	3	–	0	6	–	5	–	0
Morehead State	2	–	5	–	0	5	–	6	–	0
Murray State	2	–	5	–	0	4	–	7	–	0
Austin Peay	2	–	5	–	0	3	–	7	–	0
Tennessee Tech	1	–	6	–	0	3	–	8	–	0
$ – Conference champion; ^ – NCAA Division I-AA playoff participant; Rankings from NCAA Division I-AA Football Committee poll

The 1982 Eastern Kentucky Colonels football team was an American football team that represented Eastern Kentucky University as a member of the Ohio Valley Conference (OVC) during the 1982 NCAA Division I-AA football season. In their 19th season under head coach Roy Kidd, the Colonels compiled a perfect 13–0 record and defeated Delaware in the 1982 NCAA Division I-AA Football Championship Game.

== Schedule ==
Date	Time	Opponent	Rank	Site	Result	Attendance	Source
September 4		at South Carolina State*		State College Stadium; Orangeburg, SC	W 20–19	11,008	
September 11		Youngstown State		Hanger Field; Richmond, KY	W 31–17	14,600	
September 24		at Akron	No. 2	Rubber Bowl; Akron, OH	W 19–10	9,286	
October 2		at Austin Peay	No. 1	Municipal Stadium; Clarksville, TN	W 27–18	6,000	
October 9		Middle Tennessee^{†}	No. 1	Hanger Field; Richmond, KY	W 35–10	17,700	
October 23		at Western Kentucky*	No. 1	L. T. Smith Stadium; Bowling Green, KY	W 35–21	18,000	
October 28		Murray State	No. 1	Hanger Field; Richmond, KY	W 21–20	18,100	
November 6		at Tennessee Tech	No. 1	Tucker Stadium; Cookeville, TN	W 34–17	4,042	
November 13		at UCF*	No. 1	Orlando Stadium; Orlando, FL	W 26–14	4,822	
November 20		Morehead State	No. 1	Hanger Field; Richmond, KY	W 20–3	14,400	
December 4	8:12 p.m.	No. 9 Idaho*	No. 1	Hanger Field; Richmond, KY (NCAA Division I-AA Quarterfinal)	W 38–30	10,893	
December 11		No. 4 Tennessee State*	No. 1	Hanger Field; Richmond, KY (NCAA Division I-AA Semifinal)	W 13–7	7,338	
December 18		vs. No. 3 Delaware*	No. 1	Memorial Stadium; Wichita Falls, TX (NCAA Division I-AA Championship Game—Pioneer Bowl)	W 17–14	11,257	
*Non-conference game; ^{†}Homecoming; Rankings from NCAA Division I-AA Football Committee Poll released prior to the game; All times are in Eastern time
