= 1982 Central Michigan Chippewas football team =

American college football season

1982 Central Michigan Chippewas football
- Conference: Mid-American Conference
- Record: 6–4–1 (5–3–1 MAC)
- Head coach: Herb Deromedi (5th season)
- MVP: Ray Bentley
- Home stadium: Perry Shorts Stadium

1982 Mid-American Conference football standings
	Conf.					Overall
Team	W		L		T	W		L		T
Bowling Green $	7	–	2	–	0	7	–	5	–	0
Western Michigan	5	–	2	–	2	7	–	2	–	2
Miami (OH)	5	–	3	–	0	7	–	4	–	0
Central Michigan	5	–	3	–	1	6	–	4	–	1
Ohio	5	–	4	–	0	6	–	5	–	0
Toledo	5	–	4	–	0	6	–	5	–	0
Northern Illinois	5	–	4	–	0	5	–	5	–	0
Ball State	4	–	4	–	0	5	–	6	–	0
Eastern Michigan	1	–	7	–	1	1	–	9	–	1
Kent State	0	–	9	–	0	0	–	11	–	0
$ – Conference champion; The conference was a hybrid of NCAA Division I-A and I-AA programs. Central Michigan and Toledo were I-A while the other teams were classified as I-AA for the 1982 season only.

The 1982 Central Michigan Chippewas football team represented Central Michigan University in the Mid-American Conference (MAC) during the 1982 NCAA Division I-A football season. In their fifth season under head coach Herb Deromedi, the Chippewas compiled a 6–4–1 record (5–3–1 against MAC opponents), finished in a three-way tie for second place in the MAC standings, and outscored their opponents, 228 to 199. The team played its home games in Perry Shorts Stadium in Mount Pleasant, Michigan, with attendance of 139,653 in six home games.

The team's statistical leaders included quarterback Bob DeMarco with 1,113 passing yards, tailback Curtis Adams with 1,090 rushing yards, and Jaime Jackson with 412 receiving yards. Linebacker Ray Bentley received the team's most valuable player award. Three Central Michigan players (Adams, Bentley, and offensive guard Chris McKay) received first-team All-MAC honors.

== Schedule ==
Date	Time	Opponent	Site	Result	Attendance	Source
September 4		Indiana State*	Perry Shorts Stadium; Mount Pleasant, MI	W 35–10	15,822	
September 18		Bowling Green	Perry Shorts Stadium; Mount Pleasant, MI	L 30–34	25,883	
September 25		at East Carolina*	Ficklen Memorial Stadium; Greenville, NC	L 6–24	18,750	
October 2	7:30 p.m.	at Eastern Michigan	Rynearson Stadium; Ypsilanti, MI (rivalry)	W 13–8	12,983	
October 9	1:28 p.m.	Western Michigan	Perry Shorts Stadium; Mount Pleasant, MI (rivalry)	T 18–18	28,632	
October 16	1:31 p.m.	Toledo	Perry Shorts Stadium; Mount Pleasant, MI	W 16–12	18,321	
October 23	1:00 p.m.	at Kent State	Dix Stadium; Kent, OH	W 31–20	12,304	
October 30	1:32 p.m.	Ohio	Perry Shorts Stadium; Mount Pleasant, MI	W 42–18	24,382	
November 6	1:30 p.m.	at Miami (OH)	Miami Field; Oxford, OH	L 0–23	18,626	
November 13		Ball State	Perry Shorts Stadium; Mount Pleasant, MI	W 24–13	16,582	
November 20	2:30 p.m.	at Northern Illinois	Huskie Stadium; DeKalb, IL	L 13–19	22,618–24,380	
*Non-conference game; All times are in Eastern time
