= 1981 Middle Tennessee Blue Raiders football team =

American college football season

1981 Middle Tennessee Blue Raiders football
- Conference: Ohio Valley Conference
- Record: 6–5 (4–4 OVC)
- Head coach: Boots Donnelly (3rd season)
- Home stadium: Johnny "Red" Floyd Stadium

1981 Ohio Valley Conference football standings
	Conf.					Overall
Team	W		L		T	W		L		T
No. 1 Eastern Kentucky $^	8	–	0	–	0	12	–	2	–	0
No. 9 Murray State	5	–	3	–	0	8	–	3	–	0
Youngstown State	5	–	3	–	0	7	–	4	–	0
Tennessee Tech	4	–	4	–	0	6	–	5	–	0
Middle Tennessee	4	–	4	–	0	6	–	5	–	0
Western Kentucky	4	–	4	–	0	6	–	5	–	0
Akron	4	–	4	–	0	5	–	5	–	0
Austin Peay	3	–	5	–	0	5	–	5	–	0
Morehead State	0	–	8	–	0	1	–	9	–	0
$ – Conference champion; ^ – NCAA Division I-AA playoff participant; Rankings from NCAA Division I-AA Football Committee poll

The 1981 Middle Tennessee Blue Raiders football team represented Middle Tennessee State University in the 1981 NCAA Division I-AA football season. Th team finished with a 6–5 record, 4–4 (tied for fourth) in the Ohio Valley Conference.

== Schedule ==
Date	Opponent	Rank	Site	Result	Attendance	Source
September 5	at Akron		Rubber Bowl; Akron, OH	W 10–7	31,004	
September 12	at Chattanooga*		Chamberlain Field; Chattanooga, TN	L 19–42	10,800	
September 19	Tennessee–Martin*		Johnny "Red" Floyd Stadium; Murfreesboro, TN	W 6–3		
September 26	at Morehead State		Jayne Stadium; Morehead, KY	W 20–7	7,500	
October 3	at Western Carolina*		E. J. Whitmire Stadium; Cullowhee, NC	W 20–7	7,200	
October 10	No. 4 Eastern Kentucky		Johnny "Red" Floyd Stadium; Murfreesboro, TN	L 7–23	11,500	
October 17	No. 1 Murray State	No. 7	Johnny "Red" Floyd Stadium; Murfreesboro, TN	W 14–9	6,000	
October 24	at Austin Peay		Municipal Stadium; Clarksville, TN	L 9–14	8,750	
October 31	Youngstown State^{†}		Johnny "Red" Floyd Stadium; Murfreesboro, TN	L 10–13	10,000	
November 14	Western Kentucky		Johnny "Red" Floyd Stadium; Murfreesboro, TN	W 31–17	3,500	
November 21	Tennessee Tech		Johnny "Red" Floyd Stadium; Murfreesboro, TN	L 9–28	7,000	
*Non-conference game; ^{†}Homecoming; Rankings from NCAA Division I-AA Football Committee Poll released prior to the game
