= 1982 Morehead State Eagles football team =

American college football season

1982 Morehead State Eagles football
- Conference: Ohio Valley Conference
- Record: 5–6 (2–5 OVC)
- Head coach: Steve Loney (2nd season)
- Home stadium: Jayne Stadium

1982 Ohio Valley Conference football standings
| | Conf. | | | | | Overall |
| Team | W | | L | | T | W | | L | | T |
|---|---|---|---|---|---|---|---|---|---|---|
| No. 1 Eastern Kentucky $^ | 7 | – | 0 | – | 0 | 13 | – | 0 | – | 0 |
| Akron | 5 | – | 2 | – | 0 | 6 | – | 5 | – | 0 |
| Middle Tennessee | 4 | – | 3 | – | 0 | 8 | – | 3 | – | 0 |
| Youngstown State | 4 | – | 3 | – | 0 | 6 | – | 5 | – | 0 |
| Morehead State | 2 | – | 5 | – | 0 | 5 | – | 6 | – | 0 |
| Murray State | 2 | – | 5 | – | 0 | 4 | – | 7 | – | 0 |
| Austin Peay | 2 | – | 5 | – | 0 | 3 | – | 7 | – | 0 |
| Tennessee Tech | 1 | – | 6 | – | 0 | 3 | – | 8 | – | 0 |
$ – Conference champion; ^ – NCAA Division I-AA playoff participant; Rankings from NCAA Division I-AA Football Committee poll

The 1982 Morehead State Eagles football team represented Morehead State University as a member of the Ohio Valley Conference (OVC) during the 1982 NCAA Division I-AA football season. Led by second-year head coach Steve Loney, the Eagles compiled an overall record of 5–6, with a mark of 2–5 in conference play, and finished tied for fifth in the OVC.

== Schedule ==
| Date | Opponent | Site | Result | Attendance | Source |
|---|---|---|---|---|---|
| September 11 | Franklin* | Jayne Stadium; Morehead, KY | W 24–17 | 6,500 | |
| September 18 | Kentucky State* | Jayne Stadium; Morehead, KY | W 28–6 | 6,500 | |
| September 25 | at Middle Tennessee | Johnny "Red" Floyd Stadium; Murfreesboro, TN | L 0–30 | 5,000 | |
| October 2 | Murray State | Jayne Stadium; Morehead, KY | W 13–10 | 4,000 | |
| October 9 | at Austin Peay | Municipal Stadium; Clarksville, TN | L 16–17 | 4,500 | |
| October 16 | at Akron | Rubber Bowl; Akron, OH | L 6–28 | 8,682 | |
| October 23 | Tennessee Tech | Jayne Stadium; Morehead, KY | W 38–14 | 2,500 | |
| October 30 | at Western Kentucky* | L. T. Smith Stadium; Bowling Green, KY | W 17–13 | 8,000 | |
| November 6 | at Liberty Baptist* | City Stadium; Lynchburg, VA | L 10–13 | 6,147 | |
| November 13 | Youngstown State | Jayne Stadium; Morehead, KY | L 19–38 | 1,500 | |
| November 20 | at No. 1 Eastern Kentucky | Hanger Field; Richmond, KY | L 3–20 | 14,400 | |
*Non-conference game; Rankings from NCAA Division I-AA Football Committee Poll released prior to the game
