= 1982 Kent State Golden Flashes football team =

American college football season

1982 Kent State Golden Flashes football
- Conference: Mid-American Conference
- Record: 0–11 (0–9 MAC)
- Head coach: Ed Chlebek (2nd season)
- Home stadium: Dix Stadium

1982 Mid-American Conference football standings
	Conf.					Overall
Team	W		L		T	W		L		T
Bowling Green $	7	–	2	–	0	7	–	5	–	0
Western Michigan	5	–	2	–	2	7	–	2	–	2
Miami (OH)	5	–	3	–	0	7	–	4	–	0
Central Michigan	5	–	3	–	1	6	–	4	–	1
Ohio	5	–	4	–	0	6	–	5	–	0
Toledo	5	–	4	–	0	6	–	5	–	0
Northern Illinois	5	–	4	–	0	5	–	5	–	0
Ball State	4	–	4	–	0	5	–	6	–	0
Eastern Michigan	1	–	7	–	1	1	–	9	–	1
Kent State	0	–	9	–	0	0	–	11	–	0
$ – Conference champion; The conference was a hybrid of NCAA Division I-A and I-AA programs. Central Michigan and Toledo were I-A while the other teams were classified as I-AA for the 1982 season only.

The 1982 Kent State Golden Flashes football team was an American football team that represented Kent State University in the Mid-American Conference (MAC) during the 1982 NCAA Division I-A football season. In their second season under head coach Ed Chlebek, the Golden Flashes compiled a 0–11 record (0–9 against MAC opponents), finished in last place in the MAC, and were outscored by all opponents by a combined total of 270 to 114.

The team's statistical leaders included Dana Wright with 363 rushing yards, Walter Kroan with 1,304 passing yards, and Todd Feldman with 519 receiving yards.

== Schedule ==
Date	Time	Opponent	Site	Result	Attendance	Source
September 4	7:00 p.m.	at Marshall*	Fairfield Stadium; Huntington, WV	L 21–30	16,207	
September 18	7:30 p.m.	at Northern Illinois	Huskie Stadium; DeKalb, IL	L 15–23	21,212–24,736	
September 25	1:00 p.m.	at Western Michigan	Waldo Stadium; Kalamazoo, MI	L 14–24	15,542	
October 2	1:03 p.m.	Miami (OH)	Dix Stadium; Kent, OH	L 0–20	22,017	
October 9		at Iowa State*	Cyclone Stadium; Ames, IA	L 7–44	49,930	
October 16	1:04 p.m.	Ball State	Dix Stadium; Kent, OH	L 3–21	6,812	
October 23	1:00 p.m.	Central Michigan	Dix Stadium; Kent, OH	L 20–31	12,304	
October 30	1:01 p.m.	Bowling Green	Dix Stadium; Kent, OH (rivalry)	L 7–41	10,200	
November 6	1:30 p.m.	at Eastern Michigan	Rynearson Stadium; Ypsilanti, MI	L 7–9	7,208	
November 13	1:02 p.m.	Toledo	Dix Stadium; Kent, OH	L 0–3	4,400	
November 20	1:30 p.m.	at Ohio	Peden Stadium; Athens, OH	L 20–24		
*Non-conference game; All times are in Eastern time
