= 1982 Miami Redskins football team =

American college football season

1982 Miami Redskins football
- Conference: Mid-American Conference
- Record: 7–4 (5–3 MAC)
- Head coach: Tom Reed (5th season)
- Defensive coordinator: Tim Rose (5th season)
- Home stadium: Miami Field

1982 Mid-American Conference football standings
	Conf.					Overall
Team	W		L		T	W		L		T
Bowling Green $	7	–	2	–	0	7	–	5	–	0
Western Michigan	5	–	2	–	2	7	–	2	–	2
Miami (OH)	5	–	3	–	0	7	–	4	–	0
Central Michigan	5	–	3	–	1	6	–	4	–	1
Ohio	5	–	4	–	0	6	–	5	–	0
Toledo	5	–	4	–	0	6	–	5	–	0
Northern Illinois	5	–	4	–	0	5	–	5	–	0
Ball State	4	–	4	–	0	5	–	6	–	0
Eastern Michigan	1	–	7	–	1	1	–	9	–	1
Kent State	0	–	9	–	0	0	–	11	–	0
$ – Conference champion; The conference was a hybrid of NCAA Division I-A and I-AA programs. Central Michigan and Toledo were I-A while the other teams were classified as I-AA for the 1982 season only.

The 1982 Miami Redskins football team was an American football team that represented Miami University in the Mid-American Conference (MAC) during the 1982 NCAA Division I-A football season. In its fifth and final season under head coach Tom Reed, the team compiled a 7–4 record (5–3 against MAC opponents), finished in third place in the MAC, and outscored all opponents by a combined total of 195 to 121.

The team's statistical leaders included John Appold with 1,051 passing yards, Jay Peterson with 1,157 rushing yards, and Keith Dummitt with 333 receiving yards.

== Schedule ==
Date	Time	Opponent	Site	Result	Attendance	Source
September 11	1:30 p.m.	William & Mary*	Miami Field; Oxford, OH	W 35–17	18,241	
September 18	2:01 p.m.	at Northwestern*	Dyche Stadium; Evanston, IL	W 27–13	22,536	
September 25	1:30 p.m.	Eastern Michigan	Miami Field; Oxford, OH	W 35–0	17,914	
October 2	1:03 p.m.	at Kent State	Dix Stadium; Kent, OH	W 20–0	22,017	
October 9	1:35 p.m.	Bowling Green	Miami Field; Oxford, OH	W 17–12	21,833	
October 16	1:00 p.m.	at Western Michigan	Waldo Stadium; Kalamazoo, MI	L 0–10	21,500–21,550	
October 23	1:30 p.m.	at Ohio	Peden Stadium; Athens, OH (rivalry)	L 0–20	20,233–20,263	
October 30	1:34 p.m.	Toledo	Miami Field; Oxford, OH	W 21–17	22,639	
November 6	1:30 p.m.	Central Michigan	Miami Field; Oxford, OH	W 23–0	18,626	
November 13	2:30 p.m.	at Northern Illinois	Huskie Stadium; DeKalb, IL	L 7–12	15,285–15,385	
November 18	8:12 p.m.	at Cincinnati*	Riverfront Stadium; Cincinnati, OH (rivalry)	L 10–20	26,101	
*Non-conference game; All times are in Eastern time
