= Steel Tire =

College football game and award

- Akron Zips Youngstown State Penguins
- Sport: Football
- First meeting: November 2, 1940; Youngstown 13, Akron 0
- Latest meeting: November 4, 1995; Youngstown State 24, Akron 10
- Trophy: Steel Tire

Statistics
- Total meetings: 35
- All-time series: Youngstown State leads, 19–14–2 (.571)
- Largest victory: Akron, 60–27 (1969)
- Longest win streak: Akron, 6 (1963–1971)
- Current win streak: Youngstown State, 3 (1993–1995)

Locations of Akron and Youngstown State

The Steel Tire was awarded to the winner of the annual college football game between the University of Akron and Youngstown State University from 1940 until 1995. The trophy comes from the main products of the two cities; Akron for its rubber and Youngstown for its steel.

== History ==
The series was discontinued after 1995. Youngstown State leads the overall series 19–14–2, including victories in each of the last three games. The two schools were scheduled to meet on September 5, 2020, but was canceled due to continuing concerns over the COVID-19 pandemic.

== Game results ==
Akron victories	Youngstown State victories	Tie games

No.	Date	Location	Winner	Score
1	November 2, 1940	Akron, OH	Youngstown	13–0
2	November 7, 1941	Youngstown, OH	Youngstown	19–0
3	November 19, 1959	Akron, OH	Youngstown State	34–14
4	November 19, 1960	Youngstown, OH	Youngstown State	34–21
5	November 3, 1962	Youngstown, OH	Youngstown State	17–13
6	November 2, 1963	Akron, OH	Akron	21–7
7	October 7, 1967	Akron, OH	Akron	19–12
8	November 22, 1968	Youngstown, OH	Akron	48–13
9	November 8, 1969	Akron, OH	Akron	60–27
10	November 7, 1970	Youngstown, OH	Akron	42–14
11	November 20, 1971	Akron, OH	Akron	7–0
12	October 21, 1972	Youngstown, OH	Youngstown State	22–21
13	October 20, 1973	Akron, OH	Akron	31–7
14	November 16, 1974	Youngstown, OH	Youngstown State	30–0
15	October 25, 1975	Akron, OH	Akron	17–6
16	September 25, 1976	Youngstown, OH	Akron	24–3
17	October 15, 1977	Akron, OH	Youngstown State	28–10
18	October 21, 1978	Youngstown, OH	Youngstown State	27–3

No.	Date	Location	Winner	Score
19	October 20, 1979	Akron, OH	Youngstown State	16–3
20	October 4, 1980	Youngstown, OH	Tie	0–0
21	October 3, 1981	Akron, OH	Youngstown State	34–7
22	September 4, 1982	Youngstown, OH	Akron	20–19
23	November 5, 1983	Akron, OH	Akron	49–21
24	November 3, 1984	Youngstown, OH	Youngstown State	3–2
25	November 9, 1985	Akron, OH	Akron	30–5
26	November 22, 1986	Youngstown, OH	Youngstown State	40–39
27	November 21, 1987	Akron, OH	Youngstown State	10–6
28	October 1, 1988	Youngstown, OH	Akron	33–7
29	September 23, 1989	Youngstown, OH	Youngstown State	20–17
30	September 29, 1990	Youngstown, OH	Youngstown State	28–23
31	October 12, 1991	Akron, OH	Akron	38–24
32	November 14, 1992	Akron, OH	Tie	10–10
33	November 20, 1993	Akron, OH	Youngstown State	19–0
34	October 29, 1994	Youngstown, OH	Youngstown State	41–7
35	November 4, 1995	Akron, OH	Youngstown State	24–10
Series: Youngstown State leads 19–14–2

== See also ==
- List of NCAA college football rivalry games
