= 1982 Tulane Green Wave football team =

American college football season

1982 Tulane Green Wave football
- Conference: Independent
- Record: 4–7
- Head coach: Vince Gibson (3rd season)
- Offensive coordinator: Ken Meyer (2nd season)
- Home stadium: Louisiana Superdome

1982 NCAA Division I-A independents football records
	Conf.					Overall
Team	W		L		T	W		L		T
No. 1 Penn State		–		–		11	–	1	–	0
No. 10 Pittsburgh		–		–		9	–	3	–	0
No. 13 Florida State		–		–		9	–	3	–	0
No. 19 West Virginia		–		–		9	–	3	–	0
Boston College		–		–		8	–	3	–	1
Southwestern Louisiana		–		–		7	–	3	–	1
East Carolina		–		–		7	–	4	–	0
Miami (FL)		–		–		7	–	4	–	0
Southern Miss		–		–		7	–	4	–	0
Virginia Tech		–		–		7	–	4	–	0
Notre Dame		–		–		6	–	4	–	1
Cincinnati		–		–		6	–	5	–	0
Georgia Tech		–		–		6	–	5	–	0
Navy		–		–		6	–	5	–	0
Louisville		–		–		5	–	6	–	0
Rutgers		–		–		5	–	6	–	0
Army		–		–		4	–	7	–	0
South Carolina		–		–		4	–	7	–	0
Temple		–		–		4	–	7	–	0
Tulane		–		–		4	–	7	–	0
Syracuse		–		–		2	–	9	–	0
Memphis State		–		–		1	–	10	–	0
Rankings from AP Poll

The 1982 Tulane Green Wave football team was an American football team that represented Tulane University during the 1982 NCAA Division I-A football season as an independent. In their third year under head coach Vince Gibson, the team compiled a 4–7 record.

== Schedule ==
Date	Time	Opponent	Site	Result	Attendance	Source
September 4		Mississippi State	Louisiana Superdome; New Orleans, LA	L 21–30	53,641	
September 11		at No. 8 SMU	Texas Stadium; Irving, TX	L 7–51	33,814	
September 18		Rice	Louisiana Superdome; New Orleans, LA	W 30–6	33,460	
October 2		at Vanderbilt	Vanderbilt Stadium; Nashville, TN	L 21–24	40,000	
October 9		Georgia Tech	Louisiana Superdome; New Orleans, LA	L 13–19	34,321	
October 16		Southern Miss	Louisiana Superdome; New Orleans, LA (rivalry)	L 10–22	39,685	
October 23	7:30 p.m.	Memphis State	Louisiana Superdome; New Orleans, LA	W 17–10	26,710	
October 30		Baylor	Louisiana Superdome; New Orleans, LA	W 30–15	23,463	
November 6		at Ole Miss	Mississippi Veterans Memorial Stadium; Jackson, MS (rivalry)	L 14–45	23,314	
November 20		Florida	Louisiana Superdome; New Orleans, LA	L 7–21	27,795	
November 27		at No. 7 LSU	Tiger Stadium; Baton Rouge, LA (Battle for the Rag)	W 31–28	76,114	
Rankings from AP Poll released prior to the game; All times are in Central time
