= 1982 Southern Miss Golden Eagles football team =

American college football season

1982 Southern Miss Golden Eagles football
- Conference: Independent
- Record: 7–4
- Head coach: Jim Carmody (1st season)
- Offensive coordinator: Keith Daniels (1st season)
- Home stadium: M. M. Roberts Stadium

1982 NCAA Division I-A independents football records
	Conf.					Overall
Team	W		L		T	W		L		T
No. 1 Penn State		–		–		11	–	1	–	0
No. 10 Pittsburgh		–		–		9	–	3	–	0
No. 13 Florida State		–		–		9	–	3	–	0
No. 19 West Virginia		–		–		9	–	3	–	0
Boston College		–		–		8	–	3	–	1
Southwestern Louisiana		–		–		7	–	3	–	1
East Carolina		–		–		7	–	4	–	0
Miami (FL)		–		–		7	–	4	–	0
Southern Miss		–		–		7	–	4	–	0
Virginia Tech		–		–		7	–	4	–	0
Notre Dame		–		–		6	–	4	–	1
Cincinnati		–		–		6	–	5	–	0
Georgia Tech		–		–		6	–	5	–	0
Navy		–		–		6	–	5	–	0
Louisville		–		–		5	–	6	–	0
Rutgers		–		–		5	–	6	–	0
Army		–		–		4	–	7	–	0
South Carolina		–		–		4	–	7	–	0
Temple		–		–		4	–	7	–	0
Tulane		–		–		4	–	7	–	0
Syracuse		–		–		2	–	9	–	0
Memphis State		–		–		1	–	10	–	0
Rankings from AP Poll

The 1982 Southern Miss Golden Eagles football team was an American football team that represented the University of Southern Mississippi as an independent during the 1982 NCAA Division I-A football season. In their first year under head coach Jim Carmody, the team compiled a 7–4 record.

== Schedule ==
Date	Time	Opponent	Site	Result	Attendance	Source
September 4		Northeast Louisiana	M. M. Roberts Stadium; Hattiesburg, MS	W 45–27	30,767	
September 11		at Ole Miss	Hemingway Stadium; Oxford, MS	L 19–28	40,954	
September 18		at Auburn	Jordan–Hare Stadium; Auburn, AL	L 19–21	55,000	
September 25		Florida State	M. M. Roberts Stadium; Hattiesburg, MS	L 17–24	32,591	
October 2	7:01 p.m.	Memphis State	M. M. Roberts Stadium; Hattiesburg, MS (rivalry)	W 34–14	21,674	
October 9		vs. Mississippi State	Mississippi Veterans Memorial Stadium; Jackson, MS	W 20–14	54,236	
October 16		at Tulane	Louisiana Superdome; New Orleans, LA (rivalry)	W 22–10	39,685	
October 23	6:08 p.m.	Louisville^{†}	M. M. Roberts Stadium; Hattiesburg, MS	W 48–0	28,642	
October 30		Southwestern Louisiana	M. M. Roberts Stadium; Hattiesburg, MS	W 36–0	22,416	
November 13		at No. 17 Alabama	Bryant–Denny Stadium; Tuscaloosa, AL	W 38–29	60,210	
November 20		Louisiana Tech	M. M. Roberts Stadium; Hattiesburg, MS (rivalry)	L 6–13	31,256	
^{†}Homecoming; Rankings from AP Poll released prior to the game; All times are in Central time
