= 1982 Georgia Tech Yellow Jackets football team =

American college football season

1982 Georgia Tech Yellow Jackets football
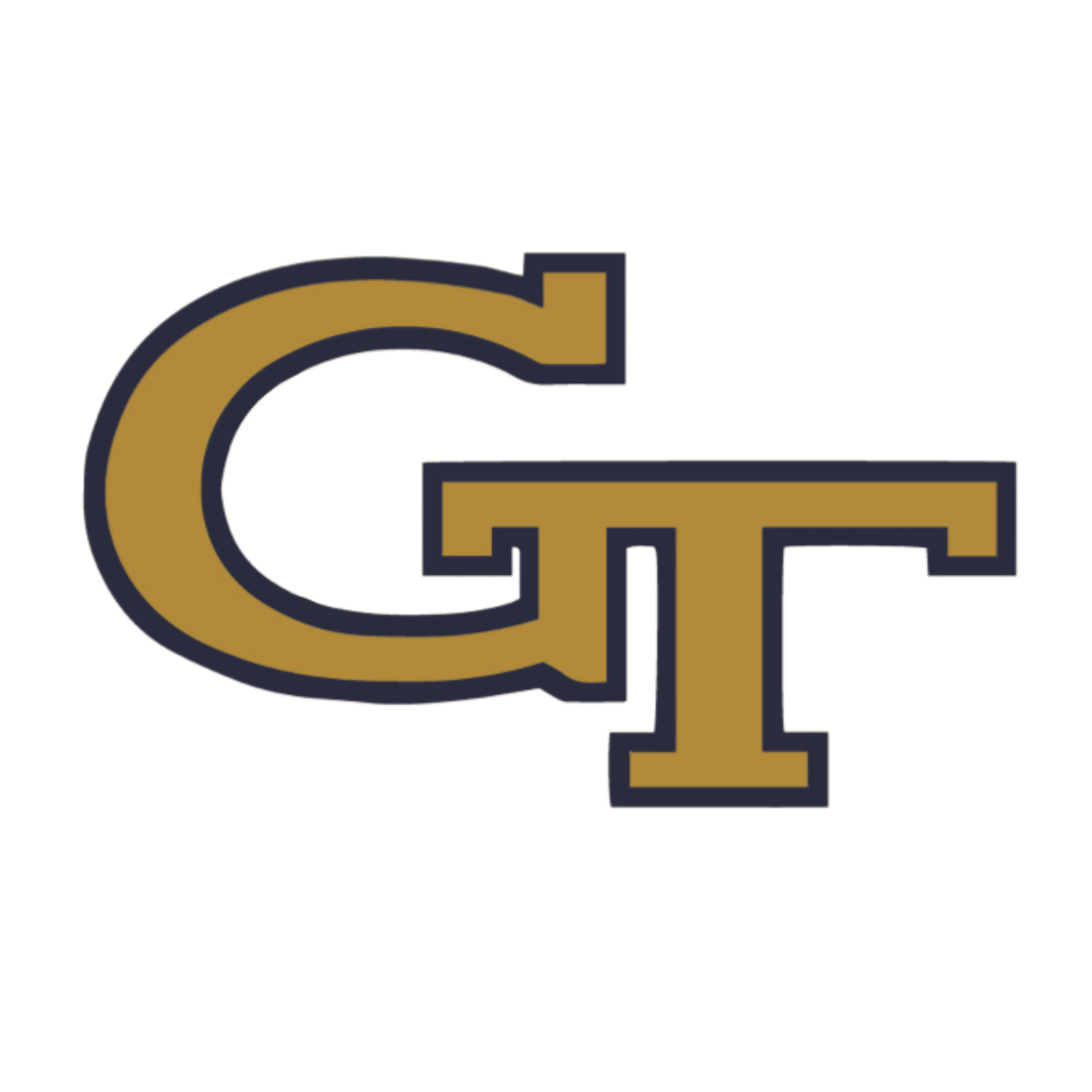
- Conference: Independent
- Record: 6–5
- Head coach: Bill Curry (3rd season)
- Offensive coordinator: Dwain Painter (1st season)
- Defensive coordinator: Rick Lantz (1st season)
- Captains: Dave Lutz; Sammy Brown; Kevin Brownlee
- Home stadium: Grant Field

1982 NCAA Division I-A independents football records
	Conf.					Overall
Team	W		L		T	W		L		T
No. 1 Penn State		–		–		11	–	1	–	0
No. 10 Pittsburgh		–		–		9	–	3	–	0
No. 13 Florida State		–		–		9	–	3	–	0
No. 19 West Virginia		–		–		9	–	3	–	0
Boston College		–		–		8	–	3	–	1
Southwestern Louisiana		–		–		7	–	3	–	1
East Carolina		–		–		7	–	4	–	0
Miami (FL)		–		–		7	–	4	–	0
Southern Miss		–		–		7	–	4	–	0
Virginia Tech		–		–		7	–	4	–	0
Notre Dame		–		–		6	–	4	–	1
Cincinnati		–		–		6	–	5	–	0
Georgia Tech		–		–		6	–	5	–	0
Navy		–		–		6	–	5	–	0
Louisville		–		–		5	–	6	–	0
Rutgers		–		–		5	–	6	–	0
Army		–		–		4	–	7	–	0
South Carolina		–		–		4	–	7	–	0
Temple		–		–		4	–	7	–	0
Tulane		–		–		4	–	7	–	0
Syracuse		–		–		2	–	9	–	0
Memphis State		–		–		1	–	10	–	0
Rankings from AP Poll

The 1982 Georgia Tech Yellow Jackets football team represented the Georgia Institute of Technology as an independent during the 1982 NCAA Division I-A football season. The Yellow Jackets were led by third-year head coach Bill Curry, and played their home games at Grant Field in Atlanta. It was Georgia Tech's last year competing as a football independent before joining the Atlantic Coast Conference in 1983.

== Schedule ==
Date	Time	Opponent	Site	TV	Result	Attendance	Source
September 11	12:30 p.m.	No. 4 Alabama	Grant Field; Atlanta, GA (rivalry)		L 7–45	57,126	
September 18		The Citadel	Grant Field; Atlanta, GA		W 36–7	24,463	
September 25		at Memphis State	Liberty Bowl Memorial Stadium; Memphis, TN		W 24–20	15,061	
October 2	1:00 p.m.	at No. 12 North Carolina	Kenan Memorial Stadium; Chapel Hill, NC	ABC	L 0–41	49,500	
October 9		at Tulane	Louisiana Superdome; New Orleans, LA		W 19–13	34,321	
October 16		at Auburn	Jordan-Hare Stadium; Auburn, AL (rivalry)		L 0–24	57,000	
October 23		Tennessee	Grant Field; Atlanta, GA (rivalry)	ABC	W 31–21	43,182	
October 30		Duke^{†}	Grant Field; Atlanta, GA		L 21–38	36,562	
November 6		Virginia	Grant Field; Atlanta, GA		W 38–32	22,103	
November 13		at Wake Forest	Groves Stadium; Winston-Salem, NC		W 45–7	19,257	
November 27		at No. 1 Georgia	Sanford Stadium; Athens, GA (Clean, Old-Fashioned Hate)		L 18–38	82,122	
^{†}Homecoming; Rankings from AP Poll released prior to the game; All times are in Eastern time

== Roster ==
1982 Georgia Tech Yellow Jackets football team roster
Players
Coaches
Offense

Pos.	#	Name	Class
QB	12	Jim Bob Taylor
RB		Robert Lavette
RB		Eddie Fortier
WR		David Dean	Fr
WR		Mike Harrington
WR		Jeff Keisler
TE	9	Ken Whisenhunt
TE		Gary Wilkins
OL		Derek Gwinn
OT	78	Dave Lutz
OL		Ellis Gardner
OL		Ken Howell
OL		Dean Waters

Defense

Pos.	#	Name	Class
DL		Bobby Hodge
DL		Donnie Chisholm
DL		Marvin Dyett
LB	56	Robert Jaracz
LB		Rob Horton
LB		Dante Jones
LB		Duane Wood
LB		Pat Swilling
LB		Ted Roof
CB	22	Jack Westbrook
DB		Sammy Brown
DB		Paul Menegazzi
DB		Mike Travis
DB		Ted Thurson

Special teams

Pos.	#	Name	Class

Head coach

- Bill Curry

Coordinators/assistant coaches

- Dwain Painter – Offensive coordinator
- Rip Scherer – Running backs
- Jeff Hollis – Offensive line
- Dan Dorazio – Offensive line
- Mac McWhorter – Offensive line
- Rick Lantz – Defensive coordinator
- John Guy – Defensive line
- Barry Wilson – Inside linebackers
- Rick Smith – Defensive backs

Legend

- (C) Team captain
- (S) Suspended
- (I) Ineligible
- Injured
- Redshirt
