= 1982 East Carolina Pirates football team =

American college football season

1982 East Carolina Pirates football
- Conference: Independent
- Record: 7–4
- Head coach: Ed Emory (3rd season)
- Defensive coordinator: Norm Parker (3rd season)
- Home stadium: Ficklen Memorial Stadium

1982 NCAA Division I-A independents football records
	Conf.					Overall
Team	W		L		T	W		L		T
No. 1 Penn State		–		–		11	–	1	–	0
No. 10 Pittsburgh		–		–		9	–	3	–	0
No. 13 Florida State		–		–		9	–	3	–	0
No. 19 West Virginia		–		–		9	–	3	–	0
Boston College		–		–		8	–	3	–	1
Southwestern Louisiana		–		–		7	–	3	–	1
East Carolina		–		–		7	–	4	–	0
Miami (FL)		–		–		7	–	4	–	0
Southern Miss		–		–		7	–	4	–	0
Virginia Tech		–		–		7	–	4	–	0
Notre Dame		–		–		6	–	4	–	1
Cincinnati		–		–		6	–	5	–	0
Georgia Tech		–		–		6	–	5	–	0
Navy		–		–		6	–	5	–	0
Louisville		–		–		5	–	6	–	0
Rutgers		–		–		5	–	6	–	0
Army		–		–		4	–	7	–	0
South Carolina		–		–		4	–	7	–	0
Temple		–		–		4	–	7	–	0
Tulane		–		–		4	–	7	–	0
Syracuse		–		–		2	–	9	–	0
Memphis State		–		–		1	–	10	–	0
Rankings from AP Poll

The 1982 East Carolina Pirates football team was an American football team that represented East Carolina University as an independent during the 1982 NCAA Division I-A football season. In their third season under head coach Ed Emory, the team compiled a 7–4 record.

== Schedule ==
Date	Time	Opponent	Site	Result	Attendance	Source
September 11		at NC State	Carter–Finley Stadium; Raleigh, NC (rivalry)	L 26–33	55,200	
September 18		East Tennessee State	Ficklen Memorial Stadium; Greenville, NC	W 30–0	22,127	
September 25		Central Michigan	Ficklen Memorial Stadium; Greenville, NC	W 24–6	18,750	
October 2		at Missouri	Faurot Field; Columbia, MO	L 9–28	50,848	
October 9		Richmond	Ficklen Memorial Stadium; Greenville, NC	W 35–14	19,521	
October 16		at No. 19 Florida State	Doak Campbell Stadium; Tallahassee, FL	L 17–56	46,283	
October 23		Illinois State	Ficklen Memorial Stadium; Greenville, NC	W 21–0	26,771	
October 30		at No. 18 West Virginia	Mountaineer Field; Morgantown, WV	L 3–30	50,616	
November 6	8:30 p.m.	at UT Arlington	Maverick Stadium; Arlington, TX	W 40–24	4,388	
November 13		at William & Mary	Cary Field; Williamsburg, VA	W 31–27	10,800	
November 20		at Temple	Veterans Stadium; Philadelphia, PA	W 23–10	6,135	
Rankings from AP Poll released prior to the game; All times are in Eastern time
