= 1982 Cincinnati Bearcats football team =

American college football season

1982 Cincinnati Bearcats football
- Conference: Independent
- Record: 6–5
- Head coach: Mike Gottfried (2nd season)
- Captains: Danny Barrett; Mike Gates; Antonio Gibson; Joe Olding; George Warhop
- Home stadium: Riverfront Stadium, Nippert Stadium

1982 NCAA Division I-A independents football records
	Conf.					Overall
Team	W		L		T	W		L		T
No. 1 Penn State		–		–		11	–	1	–	0
No. 10 Pittsburgh		–		–		9	–	3	–	0
No. 13 Florida State		–		–		9	–	3	–	0
No. 19 West Virginia		–		–		9	–	3	–	0
Boston College		–		–		8	–	3	–	1
Southwestern Louisiana		–		–		7	–	3	–	1
East Carolina		–		–		7	–	4	–	0
Miami (FL)		–		–		7	–	4	–	0
Southern Miss		–		–		7	–	4	–	0
Virginia Tech		–		–		7	–	4	–	0
Notre Dame		–		–		6	–	4	–	1
Cincinnati		–		–		6	–	5	–	0
Georgia Tech		–		–		6	–	5	–	0
Navy		–		–		6	–	5	–	0
Louisville		–		–		5	–	6	–	0
Rutgers		–		–		5	–	6	–	0
Army		–		–		4	–	7	–	0
South Carolina		–		–		4	–	7	–	0
Temple		–		–		4	–	7	–	0
Tulane		–		–		4	–	7	–	0
Syracuse		–		–		2	–	9	–	0
Memphis State		–		–		1	–	10	–	0
Rankings from AP Poll

The 1982 Cincinnati Bearcats football team represented University of Cincinnati as an independent during the 1982 NCAA Division I-A football season. Led by Mike Gottfried in his second and final season as head coach, the Bearcats compiled a record of 6–5. Beginning in 1982, to meet NCAA Division I-A stadium capacity requirements, the Cincinnati played home games at Riverfront Stadium. On-campus Nippert Stadium was used as a supplement.

== Schedule ==
Date	Time	Opponent	Site	Result	Attendance	Source
September 4	7:00 p.m.	at Florida State	Doak Campbell Stadium; Tallahassee, FL	L 31–38	49,253	
September 11	1:30 p.m.	Louisville	Riverfront Stadium; Cincinnati, OH (rivalry)	W 38–16	14,324	
September 25	7:35 p.m.	Youngstown State	Nippert Stadium; Cincinnati, OH	W 57–3	22,750	
October 2	7:00 p.m.	at South Carolina	Williams–Brice Stadium; Columbia, SC	L 10–37	59,148	
October 9	1:30 p.m.	Long Beach State	Riverfront Stadium; Cincinnati, OH	W 34–14	13,187	
October 16		at Memphis State	Liberty Bowl Memorial Stadium; Memphis, TN (rivalry)	W 16–7	13,678	
October 23		at No. 7 Alabama	Bryant–Denny Stadium; Tuscaloosa, AL	L 3–21	60,210	
October 30	1:30 p.m.	at Temple	Veterans Stadium; Philadelphia, PA	L 7–42	10,171	
November 13	2:00 p.m.	Morgan State	Riverfront Stadium; Cincinnati, OH	W 52–0	17,965	
November 18	8:12 p.m.	Miami (OH)	Riverfront Stadium; Cincinnati, OH (Victory Bell)	W 20–10	26,101	
November 27	2:00 p.m.	at Miami (FL)	Miami Orange Bowl; Miami, FL	L 13–19	18,447	
Rankings from AP Poll released prior to the game

== Roster ==
1982 Cincinnati Bearcats football team roster
Players
Coaches
Offense

Pos.	#	Name	Class
QB	6	Danny Barrett	Sr
FB	26	Don Goodman	Jr

Defense

Pos.	#	Name	Class
CB	21	Joe Curl	Sr
DT	82	George Jamison	Jr
DB	10	Mel Jenkins	Jr

Special teams

Pos.	#	Name	Class
P	2	Phill Peckich	Sr

Head coach

- Mike Gottfried

Coordinators/assistant coaches

Legend

- (C) Team captain
- (S) Suspended
- (I) Ineligible
- Injured
- Redshirt
