= 1982 Virginia Tech Hokies football team =

American college football season

1982 Virginia Tech Hokies football
- Conference: Independent
- Record: 7–4
- Head coach: Bill Dooley (5th season)
- Defensive coordinator: John Gutekunst (2nd season)
- Home stadium: Lane Stadium

1982 NCAA Division I-A independents football records
	Conf.					Overall
Team	W		L		T	W		L		T
No. 1 Penn State		–		–		11	–	1	–	0
No. 10 Pittsburgh		–		–		9	–	3	–	0
No. 13 Florida State		–		–		9	–	3	–	0
No. 19 West Virginia		–		–		9	–	3	–	0
Boston College		–		–		8	–	3	–	1
Southwestern Louisiana		–		–		7	–	3	–	1
East Carolina		–		–		7	–	4	–	0
Miami (FL)		–		–		7	–	4	–	0
Southern Miss		–		–		7	–	4	–	0
Virginia Tech		–		–		7	–	4	–	0
Notre Dame		–		–		6	–	4	–	1
Cincinnati		–		–		6	–	5	–	0
Georgia Tech		–		–		6	–	5	–	0
Navy		–		–		6	–	5	–	0
Louisville		–		–		5	–	6	–	0
Rutgers		–		–		5	–	6	–	0
Army		–		–		4	–	7	–	0
South Carolina		–		–		4	–	7	–	0
Temple		–		–		4	–	7	–	0
Tulane		–		–		4	–	7	–	0
Syracuse		–		–		2	–	9	–	0
Memphis State		–		–		1	–	10	–	0
Rankings from AP Poll

The 1982 Virginia Tech Hokies football team was an American football team that represented Virginia Tech as an independent during the 1982 NCAA Division I-A football season. In their fifth year under head coach Bill Dooley, the Hokies compiled an overall record of 7–4. The Thanksgiving Day game versus UVA was the first night game played at Lane Stadium.

== Schedule ==
Date	Time	Opponent	Site	TV	Result	Attendance	Source
September 4		at Richmond	City Stadium; Richmond, VA		W 20–9	22,600	
September 18	1:38 p.m.	No. 15 Miami (FL)	Lane Stadium; Blacksburg, VA (rivalry)	CBS	L 8–14	45,200	
September 25		William & Mary	Lane Stadium; Blacksburg, VA		W 47–3	34,800	
October 2		Wake Forest	Lane Stadium; Blacksburg, VA		L 10–13	37,300	
October 9		at Duke	Wallace Wade Stadium; Durham, NC	CBS	W 22–21	25,125	
October 16		No. 13 West Virginia	Lane Stadium; Blacksburg, VA (rivalry)		L 6–16	52,300	
October 23		Appalachian State^{†}	Lane Stadium; Blacksburg, VA		W 34–0	37,400	
October 30		Kentucky	Lane Stadium; Blacksburg, VA		W 29–3	35,700	
November 13		at Vanderbilt	Vanderbilt Stadium; Nashville, TN		L 0–45	40,356	
November 20		vs. VMI	Foreman Field; Norfolk, VA (Oyster Bowl, rivalry)		W 14–3	25,600	
November 25		Virginia	Lane Stadium; Blacksburg, VA (rivalry)	TBS	W 21–14	23,800	
^{†}Homecoming; Rankings from AP Poll released prior to the game; All times are in Eastern time

== Roster ==
The following players were members of the 1982 football team.

1982 Virginia Tech roster
Nigel Bowe; Greg Brooks; Geoff Brown; Wally Browne; Bryan Burleigh; Derek Carter; Jake Clarke; Otis Copeland; John Cowne; Mark Cox; Phil Culicerto; George Evans; Ray Fitts; John Fitzgerald; Gillett Ford; Milton Franklin; Ken Frontain; Mike Giacolone; Leon Gordon; Todd Greenwood; Alan Harris; Tom Hartman; Nolan Hazzard; Mike Hill; Billy Hite	Terrence Howell; Leno Ilardo; Randy Jamison; Mike Johnson; Vincent Johnson; Joe Jones; Ed Keiffer; Thor Kritsky; Cyrus Lawrence; Ashley Lee; Billy Leeson; Allen Little; John Ludlow; David Marvel; Tony McKee; Richard Harold Miley; Clarence Nelson; Kyle Neve; Tony Paige; James Patterson; Jesse Penn; Padro Phillips; John Polascik; Bill Renner; Leon Rhodes	John Ritz; James Robinson; Steve Scaggs; John Scott; Mike Shaw; Alonzo Smith; Bruce Smith; Jim Smith; Jimmy Smith; Willie Smith; Allen Talbott; Allan Thomas; Bob Thomas; Jeremiah Thomas; Kent Thomas; John Tuggle; Mark Udinski; Cornell Urquhart; Don Wade; Bob Watson; Scott Sharpe Wauters; Trevor Wright; George Yeager; B. J. Zwinak
