= Sam Robertson (American football) =

American football player and coach (born 1943)

Biographical details
- Born: February 2, 1943 (age 83)

Playing career
- 1963–1965: Tennessee
- Position: Linebacker

Coaching career (HC unless noted)
- 1966: Tennessee (student assistant)
- 1967–1971: Kansas State (assistant)
- 1972: Oregon (LB)
- 1973: Oregon (DC/LB)
- 1974–1977: Southwestern Louisiana (DC)
- 1978–1979: Texas Tech (DC)
- 1980–1985: Southwestern Louisiana

Head coaching record
- Overall: 29–34–2

Accomplishments and honors

Awards
- Southland Coach of the Year (1980)

Sam Robertson (born February 2, 1943) is an American former college football coach. He served as the defensive coordinator for the Texas Tech Red Raiders during the 1978 and 1979 seasons under head coach Rex Dockery. Robertson left Texas Tech after he was named head coach of the Southwestern Louisiana Ragin' Cajuns. While head coach at Southwestern Louisiana (now the University of Louisiana at Lafayette), Robertson compiled a record of 29–34–2 from 1980 to 1985.

Since leaving coaching in the 1980s, Robertson has become a real estate agent in Lafayette, Louisiana, owning Sam Robertson Real Estate Co.

== Head coaching record ==
Year	Team	Overall	Conference	Standing	Bowl/playoffs
Southwestern Louisiana Ragin' Cajuns (Southland Conference) (1980–1981)
1980	Southwestern Louisiana	7–4	4–1	2nd	
1981	Southwestern Louisiana	1–9–1	0–4–1	6th	
Southwestern Louisiana Ragin' Cajuns (NCAA Division I-A independent) (1982–1985)
1982	Southwestern Louisiana	7–3–1			
1983	Southwestern Louisiana	4–6			
1984	Southwestern Louisiana	6–5			
1985	Southwestern Louisiana	4–7			
Southwestern Louisiana:		29–34–2	4–5–1		
Total:		29–34–2			
