= Battle for the Bell =

The Battle for the Bell may refer to:

- Battle for the Bell (Marshall–Ohio), college football rivalry between Marshall University and Ohio University
- Battle for the Bell (Southern Miss–Tulane), college football rivalry between the University of Southern Mississippi and Tulane University
