= 1982 Miami Hurricanes football team =

American college football team season

1982 Miami Hurricanes football
- Conference: Independent
- Record: 7–4
- Head coach: Howard Schnellenberger (4th season)
- Offensive coordinator: Kim Helton (4th season)
- Offensive scheme: Pro-style
- Defensive coordinator: Tom Olivadotti (2nd season)
- Base defense: 5–2
- MVP: Jay Brophy
- Home stadium: Miami Orange Bowl

1982 NCAA Division I-A independents football records
	Conf.					Overall
Team	W		L		T	W		L		T
No. 1 Penn State		–		–		11	–	1	–	0
No. 10 Pittsburgh		–		–		9	–	3	–	0
No. 13 Florida State		–		–		9	–	3	–	0
No. 19 West Virginia		–		–		9	–	3	–	0
Boston College		–		–		8	–	3	–	1
Southwestern Louisiana		–		–		7	–	3	–	1
East Carolina		–		–		7	–	4	–	0
Miami (FL)		–		–		7	–	4	–	0
Southern Miss		–		–		7	–	4	–	0
Virginia Tech		–		–		7	–	4	–	0
Notre Dame		–		–		6	–	4	–	1
Cincinnati		–		–		6	–	5	–	0
Georgia Tech		–		–		6	–	5	–	0
Navy		–		–		6	–	5	–	0
Louisville		–		–		5	–	6	–	0
Rutgers		–		–		5	–	6	–	0
Army		–		–		4	–	7	–	0
South Carolina		–		–		4	–	7	–	0
Temple		–		–		4	–	7	–	0
Tulane		–		–		4	–	7	–	0
Syracuse		–		–		2	–	9	–	0
Memphis State		–		–		1	–	10	–	0
Rankings from AP Poll

The 1982 Miami Hurricanes football team represented the University of Miami as an independent during the 1982 NCAA Division I-A football season. Led by fourth-year head coach Howard Schnellenberger, the Hurricanes compiled a record of 7–4. The team played home games at the Miami Orange Bowl in Miami.

== Schedule ==
Date	Time	Opponent	Rank	Site	TV	Result	Attendance	Source
September 4		at No. 16 Florida	No. 15	Florida Field; Gainesville, FL (rivalry)		L 14–17	71,864	
September 11	3:50 p.m.	Houston	No. 19	Miami Orange Bowl; Miami, FL	ABC	W 31–12	24,687	
September 18	1:38 p.m.	at Virginia Tech	No. 15	Lane Stadium; Blacksburg, VA (rivalry)	CBS	W 14–8	45,200	
September 25	4:00 p.m.	Michigan State	No. 16	Miami Orange Bowl; Miami, FL		W 25–22	26,478	
October 2	7:08 p.m.	at Louisville	No. 17	Cardinal Stadium; Louisville, KY (rivalry)		W 28–6	28,749	
October 9	1:31 p.m.	at No. 10 Notre Dame	No. 17	Notre Dame Stadium; South Bend, IN (rivalry)		L 14–16	59,075	
October 16	4:00 p.m.	Mississippi State	No. 17	Miami Orange Bowl; Miami, FL		W 31–14	28,717	
October 30	12:38 p.m.	No. 14 Florida State^{†}	No. 16	Miami Orange Bowl; Miami, FL (rivalry)	CBS	L 7–24	54,696	
November 6	1:31 p.m.	at No. 19 Maryland		Byrd Stadium; College Park, MD		L 17–18	43,200	
November 20	2:00 p.m.	NC State		Miami Orange Bowl; Miami, FL		W 41–3	20,434	
November 27	2:00 p.m.	Cincinnati		Miami Orange Bowl; Miami, FL		W 19–13	18,447	
^{†}Homecoming; Rankings from AP Poll released prior to the game; All times are in Eastern time

== Game summaries ==
=== Michigan State ===
Team	1	2	3	4	Total
Michigan St	0	14	8	0	22
• Miami (FL)	6	9	3	7	25

- Date: September 25
- Location: Orange Bowl • Miami, Florida

Scoring summary
1	MIA	Baratta 3-yard pass from Richt (kick failed)	Miami (FL) 6-0
2	MIA	Boone 63-yard interception return (pass failed)	Miami (FL) 12-0
2	MSU	Ellis 16-yard run (Mojsiejenko kick)	Miami (FL) 12-7
2	MSU	Grant 15-yard pass from Leister (Mojsiejenko kick)	Michigan St 14-12
2	MIA	Davis 46-yard field goal	Miami (FL) 15-14
3	MSU	Ellis 6-yard run (Tanker pass from Scharlo)	Michigan St 22-15
3	MIA	Davis 47-yard field goal	Michigan St 22-18
4	MIA	Rush 1-yard run (Davis kick)	Miami (FL) 25-22

=== At Notre Dame ===
Team	1	2	3	4	Total
Miami (FL)	0	0	7	7	14
• Notre Dame	0	7	3	6	16

- Date: October 9
- Location: Notre Dame Stadium • South Bend, Indiana
- Game attendance: 59,075

Scoring summary
Q2	2:25	ND	Kiel 6 yard run (Johnson kick)	ND 7–0
Q3	11:47	Miami	Richt 1 yard pass to Dennison (Davis kick)	Tie 7-7
Q3	2:53	ND	Johnson 29 yard field goal	ND 10-7
Q4	13:03	Miami	Richt 79 yard pass to Belk (Davis kick)	Miami 14-10
Q4	8:27	ND	Johnson 42 yard field goal	Miami 14-13
Q4	:11	ND	Johnson 32 yard field goal	ND 16-14

== Roster ==
1982 Miami Hurricanes football team roster
Players
Coaches
Offense

Pos.	#	Name	Class
C	61	Don Bailey	Sr
WR	20	Rocky Belk	Sr
RB	16	Albert Bentley	Jr
OT	53	John Canei	Sr
WR	19	Keith Cleveland	Jr
OT	78	Mark Cooper	Sr
TE	86	Glenn Dennison	Jr
G	68	Andy Dickerson	So
RB	44	Keith Griffin	Jr
OT	52	Dave Heffernan	So
QB	12	Jim Kelly	Sr
QB	1	Bernie Kosar	Fr
G	67	Eric Larkin	So
G	50	Mike Moore	Jr
RB	38	Speedy Neal	Jr
OT	77	Paul O'Connor	Fr
RB	38	Darryl Oliver	Fr
WR	6	Stanley Shakespeare	So
WR	30	Willie Smith	Fr
QB	9	Mark Richt	Sr
RB	49	Mark Rush	Sr
G	76	Ian Sinclair	So
QB	18	Vinny Testaverde	Fr
WR	22	Lawrence Thompson	Jr
QB	13	Kyle Vanderwende	Fr

Defense

Pos.	#	Name	Class
DB	31	Carl Bell	Fr
DB	4	Rodney Bellinger	Jr
LB	54	Jay Brophy	Jr
LB	93	Greg Brown	Sr
DT	80	Willie Broughton	So
DT	71	Tony Chickillo	Sr
DE	99	Julio Cortes	Jr
DB	15	David Ditthardt	Jr
DT	95	Kevin Fagan	So
DE	48	Joe Kohlbrand	So
DB	17	Ronnie Lippett	Sr
DB	28	Willie Martinez	So
LB	90	Victor Morris	Fr
DT	97	Fred Robinson	Jr
LB	36	Ken Sisk	Jr
DB	32	Reggie Sutton	Fr
DE	55	Isaiah West	Sr
DB	29	Eddie Williams	Jr

Special teams

Pos.	#	Name	Class
K	3	Jeff Davis	Jr
P	5	Greg LaBelle	Sr

Head coach

- Howard Schnellenberger

Coordinators/assistant coaches

Legend

- (C) Team captain
- (S) Suspended
- (I) Ineligible
- Injured
- Redshirt

== Team players drafted into the NFL ==
Player	Position	Round	Pick	NFL club
Jim Kelly	Quarterback	1	14	Buffalo Bills
Mark Cooper	Offensive Tackle	2	31	Denver Broncos
Mark Rush	Running back	4	100	Minnesota Vikings
Tony Chickillo	Defensive tackle	5	131	Tampa Bay Buccaneers
Rocky Belk	Wide receiver	7	176	Cleveland Browns
Ronnie Lippett	Cornerback	11	283	New England Patriots
