= 1982 Rutgers Scarlet Knights football team =

American college football season

1982 Rutgers Scarlet Knights football
- Conference: Independent
- Record: 5–6
- Head coach: Frank R. Burns (10th season)
- Defensive coordinator: George DeLeone (2nd season)
- Home stadium: Rutgers Stadium; Giants Stadium

1982 Major eastern college football independents records
	Conf.					Overall
Team	W		L		T	W		L		T
No. 1 Penn State $	6	–	0	–	0	11	–	1	–	0
No. 10 Pittsburgh	4	–	1	–	0	9	–	3	–	0
No. 19 West Virginia	4	–	2	–	0	9	–	3	–	0
Boston College	3	–	2	–	0	8	–	3	–	1
Rutgers	1	–	5	–	0	5	–	6	–	0
Temple	1	–	5	–	0	4	–	7	–	0
Syracuse	1	–	5	–	0	2	–	9	–	0
$ – Lambert Trophy Winner; Rankings from AP Poll

1982 NCAA Division I-A independents football records
	Conf.					Overall
Team	W		L		T	W		L		T
No. 1 Penn State		–		–		11	–	1	–	0
No. 10 Pittsburgh		–		–		9	–	3	–	0
No. 13 Florida State		–		–		9	–	3	–	0
No. 19 West Virginia		–		–		9	–	3	–	0
Boston College		–		–		8	–	3	–	1
Southwestern Louisiana		–		–		7	–	3	–	1
East Carolina		–		–		7	–	4	–	0
Miami (FL)		–		–		7	–	4	–	0
Southern Miss		–		–		7	–	4	–	0
Virginia Tech		–		–		7	–	4	–	0
Notre Dame		–		–		6	–	4	–	1
Cincinnati		–		–		6	–	5	–	0
Georgia Tech		–		–		6	–	5	–	0
Navy		–		–		6	–	5	–	0
Louisville		–		–		5	–	6	–	0
Rutgers		–		–		5	–	6	–	0
Army		–		–		4	–	7	–	0
South Carolina		–		–		4	–	7	–	0
Temple		–		–		4	–	7	–	0
Tulane		–		–		4	–	7	–	0
Syracuse		–		–		2	–	9	–	0
Memphis State		–		–		1	–	10	–	0
Rankings from AP Poll

The 1982 Rutgers Scarlet Knights football team represented Rutgers University as an independent during the 1982 NCAA Division I-A football season. In their 10th season under head coach Frank R. Burns, the Scarlet Knights compiled a 5–6 record while competing as an independent and were outscored by their opponents 278 to 180. The team's statistical leaders included Jacque LaPrarie with 1,164 passing yards, Albert Smith with 466 rushing yards, and Andrew Baker with 472 receiving yards.

== Schedule ==
Date	Opponent	Site	Result	Attendance	Source
September 3	Syracuse	Giants Stadium; East Rutherford, NJ	L 8–13	20,890	
September 18	at No. 8 Penn State	Beaver Stadium; University Park, PA	L 14–49	83,268	
September 25	at Temple	Veterans Stadium; Philadelphia, PA	W 10–7	13,104	
October 2	William & Mary	Rutgers Stadium; Piscataway, NJ	W 27–17	20,682	
October 9	Army	Giants Stadium; East Rutherford, NJ	W 24–3	28,431	
October 16	at Boston College	Alumni Stadium; Chestnut Hill, MA	L 13–14	28,500	
October 23	No. 2 (I-AA) Colgate	Rutgers Stadium; Piscataway, NJ	W 34–17	19,423	
October 30	at Richmond	City Stadium; Richmond, VA	W 20–14	10,132	
November 6	at Auburn	Jordan-Hare Stadium; Auburn, AL	L 7–30	58,000	
November 11	No. 19 West Virginia	Giants Stadium; East Rutherford, NJ	L 17–44	27,132	
November 20	at No. 6 Pittsburgh	Pitt Stadium; Pittsburgh, PA	L 6–52	46,728	
Rankings from AP Poll released prior to the game

== Roster ==
1982 Rutgers Scarlet Knights football team roster
Players
Coaches
Offense

Pos.	#	Name	Class
RB	31	Joe Burke	Sr
QB		Eric Hochberg	Fr
QB		Jacque LaPrarie	So
QB		Ralph Leek	Sr

Defense

Pos.	#	Name	Class
CB		Carl Howard	Jr
DT	62	Bill Pickel	Sr

Special teams

Pos.	#	Name	Class

Head coach

- Frank R. Burns

Coordinators/assistant coaches

- George DeLeone
  (Defensive coordinator/linebackers coach)
- Greg Gigantino
  (Defensive line coach)

Legend

- (C) Team captain
- (S) Suspended
- (I) Ineligible
- Injured
- Redshirt
