= 1982 Syracuse Orangemen football team =

American college football season

1982 Syracuse Orangemen football
- Conference: Independent
- Record: 2–9
- Head coach: Dick MacPherson (2nd season)
- Captain: Gerry Feehery
- Home stadium: Carrier Dome

1982 Major eastern college football independents records
	Conf.					Overall
Team	W		L		T	W		L		T
No. 1 Penn State $	6	–	0	–	0	11	–	1	–	0
No. 10 Pittsburgh	4	–	1	–	0	9	–	3	–	0
No. 19 West Virginia	4	–	2	–	0	9	–	3	–	0
Boston College	3	–	2	–	0	8	–	3	–	1
Rutgers	1	–	5	–	0	5	–	6	–	0
Temple	1	–	5	–	0	4	–	7	–	0
Syracuse	1	–	5	–	0	2	–	9	–	0
$ – Lambert Trophy Winner; Rankings from AP Poll

1982 NCAA Division I-A independents football records
	Conf.					Overall
Team	W		L		T	W		L		T
No. 1 Penn State		–		–		11	–	1	–	0
No. 10 Pittsburgh		–		–		9	–	3	–	0
No. 13 Florida State		–		–		9	–	3	–	0
No. 19 West Virginia		–		–		9	–	3	–	0
Boston College		–		–		8	–	3	–	1
Southwestern Louisiana		–		–		7	–	3	–	1
East Carolina		–		–		7	–	4	–	0
Miami (FL)		–		–		7	–	4	–	0
Southern Miss		–		–		7	–	4	–	0
Virginia Tech		–		–		7	–	4	–	0
Notre Dame		–		–		6	–	4	–	1
Cincinnati		–		–		6	–	5	–	0
Georgia Tech		–		–		6	–	5	–	0
Navy		–		–		6	–	5	–	0
Louisville		–		–		5	–	6	–	0
Rutgers		–		–		5	–	6	–	0
Army		–		–		4	–	7	–	0
South Carolina		–		–		4	–	7	–	0
Temple		–		–		4	–	7	–	0
Tulane		–		–		4	–	7	–	0
Syracuse		–		–		2	–	9	–	0
Memphis State		–		–		1	–	10	–	0
Rankings from AP Poll

The 1982 Syracuse Orangemen football team represented Syracuse University as an independent during the 1982 NCAA Division I-A football season. Led by second-year head coach Dick MacPherson, the Orangemen compiled a record of 2–9. Syracuse played home games at the Carrier Dome in Syracuse, New York.

== Schedule ==
Date	Time	Opponent	Site	Result	Attendance	Source
September 3		at Rutgers	Giants Stadium; East Rutherford, NJ	W 31–8	20,890	
September 11		Temple	Carrier Dome; Syracuse, NY	L 18–23	29,574	
September 18		Illinois	Carrier Dome; Syracuse, NY	L 10–47	30,128	
September 25		at Indiana	Memorial Stadium; Bloomington, IN	L 10–17	42,020	
October 2		Maryland	Carrier Dome; Syracuse, NY	L 3–26	30,214	
October 16		at No. 8 Penn State	Beaver Stadium; University Park, PA (rivalry)	L 7–28	84,762	
October 23		No. 2 Pittsburgh	Carrier Dome; Syracuse, NY (rivalry)	L 0–14	42,321	
October 30		Colgate	Carrier Dome; Syracuse, NY (rivalry)	W 49–15	36,076	
November 6	1:30 p.m.	Navy	Carrier Dome; Syracuse, NY	L 18–20	43,443	
November 13		at Boston College	Alumni Stadium; Chestnut Hill, MA	L 13–20	21,500	
November 20		at No. 16 West Virginia	Mountaineer Field; Morgantown, WV (rivalry)	L 0–26	48,456	
Rankings from AP Poll released prior to the game; All times are in Eastern time

== Roster ==
1982 Syracuse Orange football team roster
Players
Coaches
Offense

Pos.	#	Name	Class
TE	87	Bob Brotzki	Fr
WR	13	Nick Bruckner	Sr
OT	78	Doug Marrone	Fr
RB	25	Larry Morris	So
G	63	Joe Nett	Sr
WR	14	Mike Siano	Fr
FB	43	Brent Ziegler	Sr

Defense

Pos.	#	Name	Class
DT	70	Mike Charles	Sr
LB	72	Tim Green	Fr
LB	83	Jamie Kimmel	So
LB	59	Jerry Kimmel	So
DT	98	Blaise Winter	Jr

Special teams

Pos.	#	Name	Class

Head coach

- Dick MacPherson

Coordinators/assistant coaches

Legend

- (C) Team captain
- (S) Suspended
- (I) Ineligible
- Injured
- Redshirt
