= 1982 South Carolina Gamecocks football team =

American college football season

1982 South Carolina Gamecocks football
- Conference: Independent
- Record: 4–7
- Head coach: Richard Bell (1st season)
- Offensive coordinator: Dave Fagg (1st season)
- Home stadium: Williams–Brice Stadium

1982 NCAA Division I-A independents football records
	Conf.					Overall
Team	W		L		T	W		L		T
No. 1 Penn State		–		–		11	–	1	–	0
No. 10 Pittsburgh		–		–		9	–	3	–	0
No. 13 Florida State		–		–		9	–	3	–	0
No. 19 West Virginia		–		–		9	–	3	–	0
Boston College		–		–		8	–	3	–	1
Southwestern Louisiana		–		–		7	–	3	–	1
East Carolina		–		–		7	–	4	–	0
Miami (FL)		–		–		7	–	4	–	0
Southern Miss		–		–		7	–	4	–	0
Virginia Tech		–		–		7	–	4	–	0
Notre Dame		–		–		6	–	4	–	1
Cincinnati		–		–		6	–	5	–	0
Georgia Tech		–		–		6	–	5	–	0
Navy		–		–		6	–	5	–	0
Louisville		–		–		5	–	6	–	0
Rutgers		–		–		5	–	6	–	0
Army		–		–		4	–	7	–	0
South Carolina		–		–		4	–	7	–	0
Temple		–		–		4	–	7	–	0
Tulane		–		–		4	–	7	–	0
Syracuse		–		–		2	–	9	–	0
Memphis State		–		–		1	–	10	–	0
Rankings from AP Poll

The 1982 South Carolina Gamecocks football team represented the University of South Carolina as an independent during the 1982 NCAA Division I-A football season. The Gamecocks were led by Richard Bell in his first and only season as head coach, after serving as their defensive coordinator for seven seasons. They played their home games at Williams–Brice Stadium, and compiled a record of 4–7.

Going into the challenging 1982 season, South Carolina had reasons for optimism. The team was considered talented, with a mix of veterans and competing underclassmen, and had eight home games on their schedule. However, new offensive coordinator Dave Fagg's pass-heavy offense was considered incompatible with the personnel. Among the quarterbacks, Gordon Beckham had led the upset over No. 3 North Carolina in the previous season but was not considered an elite passer, while Bill Bradshaw was a running quarterback. Throughout the season, the Gamecocks were "woeful" on offense, producing just 324 yards per game. South Carolina's loss to Furman, their first since 1949, started raising questions about Bell's job security.

Bell was fired in the offseason after refusing to fire four offensive coaches at the request of the athletic director.

== Schedule ==
Date	Time	Opponent	Site	TV	Result	Attendance	Source
September 4	7:00 p.m.	Pacific (CA)	Williams–Brice Stadium; Columbia, SC		W 41–6	61,254	
September 11		Richmond	Williams–Brice Stadium; Columbia, SC		W 30–10	52,288	
September 18		Duke	Williams–Brice Stadium; Columbia, SC		L 17–30	66,928	
September 25		No. 7 Georgia	Williams–Brice Stadium; Columbia, SC (rivalry)	USA	L 18–34	74,200	
October 2	7:00 p.m.	Cincinnati	Williams–Brice Stadium; Columbia, SC		W 37–10	59,148	
October 16		Furman	Williams–Brice Stadium; Columbia, SC		L 23–28	56,244	
October 23		at No. 14 LSU	Tiger Stadium; Baton Rouge, LA	WOLO	L 6–14	78,944	
October 30		at NC State	Carter–Finley Stadium; Raleigh, NC		L 3–33	42,300	
November 6		No. 12 Florida State	Williams–Brice Stadium; Columbia, SC		L 26–56	62,821	
November 13	1:30 p.m.	Navy	Williams–Brice Stadium; Columbia, SC		W 17–14	51,662	
November 19		at No. 10 Clemson	Memorial Stadium; Clemson, SC (rivalry)	USA	L 6–24	64,700–66,510	
Rankings from AP Poll released prior to the game; All times are in Eastern time
