= 1982 Temple Owls football team =

American college football season

1982 Temple Owls football
- Conference: Independent
- Record: 4–7
- Head coach: Wayne Hardin (13th season)
- Home stadium: Veterans Stadium, Franklin Field

1982 Major eastern college football independents records
	Conf.					Overall
Team	W		L		T	W		L		T
No. 1 Penn State $	6	–	0	–	0	11	–	1	–	0
No. 10 Pittsburgh	4	–	1	–	0	9	–	3	–	0
No. 19 West Virginia	4	–	2	–	0	9	–	3	–	0
Boston College	3	–	2	–	0	8	–	3	–	1
Rutgers	1	–	5	–	0	5	–	6	–	0
Temple	1	–	5	–	0	4	–	7	–	0
Syracuse	1	–	5	–	0	2	–	9	–	0
$ – Lambert Trophy Winner; Rankings from AP Poll

1982 NCAA Division I-A independents football records
	Conf.					Overall
Team	W		L		T	W		L		T
No. 1 Penn State		–		–		11	–	1	–	0
No. 10 Pittsburgh		–		–		9	–	3	–	0
No. 13 Florida State		–		–		9	–	3	–	0
No. 19 West Virginia		–		–		9	–	3	–	0
Boston College		–		–		8	–	3	–	1
Southwestern Louisiana		–		–		7	–	3	–	1
East Carolina		–		–		7	–	4	–	0
Miami (FL)		–		–		7	–	4	–	0
Southern Miss		–		–		7	–	4	–	0
Virginia Tech		–		–		7	–	4	–	0
Notre Dame		–		–		6	–	4	–	1
Cincinnati		–		–		6	–	5	–	0
Georgia Tech		–		–		6	–	5	–	0
Navy		–		–		6	–	5	–	0
Louisville		–		–		5	–	6	–	0
Rutgers		–		–		5	–	6	–	0
Army		–		–		4	–	7	–	0
South Carolina		–		–		4	–	7	–	0
Temple		–		–		4	–	7	–	0
Tulane		–		–		4	–	7	–	0
Syracuse		–		–		2	–	9	–	0
Memphis State		–		–		1	–	10	–	0
Rankings from AP Poll

The 1982 Temple Owls football team was an American football team that represented Temple University as an independent during the 1982 NCAA Division I-A football season. In its 13th season under head coach Wayne Hardin, the team compiled a 4–7 record and outscored opponents by a total of 220 to 202. The team played its home games at Veterans Stadium and Franklin Field in Philadelphia.

The team's statistical leaders included Tim Riordan with 1,840 passing yards, Harold Harmon with 883 rushing yards, Reggie Brown with 591 receiving yards, and Bob Clauser with 62 points scored.

== Schedule ==
Date	Time	Opponent	Site	Result	Attendance	Source
September 4		at No. 8 Penn State	Beaver Stadium; University Park, PA	L 14–31	80,000	
September 11		at Syracuse	Carrier Dome; Syracuse, NY	W 23–18	29,574	
September 18		Delaware	Franklin Field; Philadelphia, PA	W 22–0	25,463	
September 25		Rutgers	Veterans Stadium; Philadelphia, PA	L 7–10	13,104	
October 2		at No. 18 Boston College	Alumni Stadium; Chestnut Hill, MA	L 7–17	32,000	
October 9	7:09 p.m.	at Louisville	Cardinal Stadium; Louisville, KY	W 55–14	19,223	
October 16		at No. 2 Pittsburgh	Pitt Stadium; Pittsburgh, PA	L 17–38	57,250	
October 30	1:30 p.m.	Cincinnati	Veterans Stadium; Philadelphia, PA	W 41–7	10,171	
November 6		No. 17 West Virginia	Veterans Stadium; Philadelphia, PA	L 17–20	28,968	
November 13		at Colgate	Andy Kerr Stadium; Hamilton, NY	L 17–24	4,000	
November 20		East Carolina	Veterans Stadium; Philadelphia, PA	L 10–23	6,135	
Rankings from AP Poll released prior to the game; All times are in Eastern time
