= 1982 Louisville Cardinals football team =

American college football season

1982 Louisville Cardinals football
- Conference: Independent
- Record: 5–6
- Head coach: Bob Weber (3rd season)
- Home stadium: Cardinal Stadium

1982 NCAA Division I-A independents football records
	Conf.					Overall
Team	W		L		T	W		L		T
No. 1 Penn State		–		–		11	–	1	–	0
No. 10 Pittsburgh		–		–		9	–	3	–	0
No. 13 Florida State		–		–		9	–	3	–	0
No. 19 West Virginia		–		–		9	–	3	–	0
Boston College		–		–		8	–	3	–	1
Southwestern Louisiana		–		–		7	–	3	–	1
East Carolina		–		–		7	–	4	–	0
Miami (FL)		–		–		7	–	4	–	0
Southern Miss		–		–		7	–	4	–	0
Virginia Tech		–		–		7	–	4	–	0
Notre Dame		–		–		6	–	4	–	1
Cincinnati		–		–		6	–	5	–	0
Georgia Tech		–		–		6	–	5	–	0
Navy		–		–		6	–	5	–	0
Louisville		–		–		5	–	6	–	0
Rutgers		–		–		5	–	6	–	0
Army		–		–		4	–	7	–	0
South Carolina		–		–		4	–	7	–	0
Temple		–		–		4	–	7	–	0
Tulane		–		–		4	–	7	–	0
Syracuse		–		–		2	–	9	–	0
Memphis State		–		–		1	–	10	–	0
Rankings from AP Poll

The 1982 Louisville Cardinals football team represented the University of Louisville in the 1982 NCAA Division I-A football season. The Cardinals, led by third-year head coach Bob Weber, participated as independents and played their home games at Cardinal Stadium. This is the first season under this stadium name as prior to 1982 it was known as Fairgrounds Stadium.

== Schedule ==
Date	Time	Opponent	Site	Result	Attendance	Source
September 4	7:01 p.m.	Western Kentucky	Cardinal Stadium; Louisville, KY	W 20–10	24,475	
September 11	1:30 p.m.	at Cincinnati	Riverfront Stadium; Cincinnati, OH (rivalry)	L 16–38	14,324	
September 25	7:12 p.m.	Oklahoma State	Cardinal Stadium; Louisville, KY	W 28–22	21,202	
October 2	7:08 p.m.	No. 17 Miami (FL)	Cardinal Stadium; Louisville, KY (rivalry)	L 6–28	28,749	
October 9	7:09 p.m.	Temple	Cardinal Stadium; Louisville, KY	L 14–55	19,223	
October 16	3:10 p.m.	Richmond^{†}	Cardinal Stadium; Louisville, KY	W 35–0	16,381	
October 23	7:08 p.m.	at Southern Miss	M. M. Roberts Stadium; Hattiesburg, MS	L 0–48	28,642	
October 30	1:31 p.m.	at No. 1 Pittsburgh	Pitt Stadium; Pittsburgh, PA	L 14–63	53,017	
November 6	2:13 p.m.	Indiana State	Cardinal Stadium; Louisville, KY	W 35–23	15,054	
November 13	8:12 p.m.	at No. 9 Florida State	Doak Campbell Stadium; Tallahassee, FL	L 14–49	51,233	
November 20		at Memphis State	Liberty Bowl Memorial Stadium; Memphis, TN (rivalry)	W 38–19	7,370	
^{†}Homecoming; Rankings from AP Poll released prior to the game; All times are in Eastern time

== Roster ==
1982 Louisville Cardinals football team roster
Players
Coaches
Offense

Pos.	#	Name	Class
QB	5	Dean May	Jr
WR	20	Mark Clayton	Sr
WR	21	Danny Thomas	Fr
RB	27	Lamar Cummings	So
FB	31	Ron Davenport	So
OT	76	Tom Andrews	Jr
TE	81	Brad Goodman	Fr

Defense

Pos.	#	Name	Class
CB	1	Frank Minnifield	Sr
LB	2	Greg Jones	Sr
CB	34	Roger Clay	Sr
LB	39	Anthony Williams	Sr
DT	77	Pete McCartney	Jr
DT	97	Dan Williams	Sr
LB	99	Fred Blackmon	Sr

Special teams

Pos.	#	Name	Class

Head coach

- Bob Weber

Coordinators/assistant coaches

Legend

- (C) Team captain
- (S) Suspended
- (I) Ineligible
- Injured
- Redshirt
