= 1982 Memphis State Tigers football team =

American college football season

1982 Memphis State Tigers football
- Conference: Independent
- Record: 1–10
- Head coach: Rex Dockery (2nd season)
- Home stadium: Liberty Bowl Memorial Stadium

1982 NCAA Division I-A independents football records
	Conf.					Overall
Team	W		L		T	W		L		T
No. 1 Penn State		–		–		11	–	1	–	0
No. 10 Pittsburgh		–		–		9	–	3	–	0
No. 13 Florida State		–		–		9	–	3	–	0
No. 19 West Virginia		–		–		9	–	3	–	0
Boston College		–		–		8	–	3	–	1
Southwestern Louisiana		–		–		7	–	3	–	1
East Carolina		–		–		7	–	4	–	0
Miami (FL)		–		–		7	–	4	–	0
Southern Miss		–		–		7	–	4	–	0
Virginia Tech		–		–		7	–	4	–	0
Notre Dame		–		–		6	–	4	–	1
Cincinnati		–		–		6	–	5	–	0
Georgia Tech		–		–		6	–	5	–	0
Navy		–		–		6	–	5	–	0
Louisville		–		–		5	–	6	–	0
Rutgers		–		–		5	–	6	–	0
Army		–		–		4	–	7	–	0
South Carolina		–		–		4	–	7	–	0
Temple		–		–		4	–	7	–	0
Tulane		–		–		4	–	7	–	0
Syracuse		–		–		2	–	9	–	0
Memphis State		–		–		1	–	10	–	0
Rankings from AP Poll

The 1982 Memphis State Tigers football team represented Memphis State University (now known as the University of Memphis) as an independent during the 1982 NCAA Division I-A football season. In its second season under head coach Rex Dockery, the team compiled a 1–10 record (0–4 against conference opponents) and was outscored by a total of 284 to 129. The team played its home games at Liberty Bowl Memorial Stadium in Memphis, Tennessee.

The team's statistical leaders included Trell Hooper with 1,194 passing yards and 30 points scored, Richard Williams with 480 rushing yards, and Derrick Crawford with 523 receiving yards.

== Schedule ==
Date	Time	Opponent	Site	Result	Attendance	Source
September 4		at Ole Miss	Hemingway Stadium; Oxford, MS (rivalry)	L 10–27	39,150	
September 11		Vanderbilt	Liberty Bowl Memorial Stadium; Memphis, TN	L 14–24	25,704	
September 18		Mississippi State	Liberty Bowl Memorial Stadium; Memphis, TN	L 17–41	32,420	
September 25		Georgia Tech	Liberty Bowl Memorial Stadium; Memphis, TN	L 20–24	15,061	
October 2	7:00 p.m.	at Southern Miss	M. M. Roberts Stadium; Hattiesburg, MS (Black and Blue Bowl)	L 14–34	21,674	
October 16		Cincinnati	Liberty Bowl Memorial Stadium; Memphis, TN (rivalry)	L 7–16	13,678	
October 23	7:30 p.m.	at Tulane	Louisiana Superdome; New Orleans, LA	L 10–17	26,710	
October 30		at No. 3 Georgia	Sanford Stadium; Athens, GA	L 3–34	81,386	
November 6		at Tennessee	Neyland Stadium; Knoxville, TN	L 3–29	94,903	
November 20		Louisville	Liberty Bowl Memorial Stadium; Memphis, TN (rivalry)	L 19–38	7,370	
November 27		Arkansas State*	Liberty Bowl Memorial Stadium; Memphis, TN (Paint Bucket Bowl)	W 12–0	6,230	
*Non-conference game; Rankings from AP Poll released prior to the game; All times are in Central time
