= 1982 West Virginia Mountaineers football team =

American college football season

1982 West Virginia Mountaineers football

Gator Bowl, L 12–31 vs. Florida State
- Conference: Independent

Ranking
- Coaches: No. 19
- AP: No. 19
- Record: 9–3
- Head coach: Don Nehlen (3rd season)
- Defensive coordinator: Dennis Brown (3rd season)
- Home stadium: Mountaineer Field

1982 Major eastern college football independents records
	Conf.					Overall
Team	W		L		T	W		L		T
No. 1 Penn State $	6	–	0	–	0	11	–	1	–	0
No. 10 Pittsburgh	4	–	1	–	0	9	–	3	–	0
No. 19 West Virginia	4	–	2	–	0	9	–	3	–	0
Boston College	3	–	2	–	0	8	–	3	–	1
Rutgers	1	–	5	–	0	5	–	6	–	0
Temple	1	–	5	–	0	4	–	7	–	0
Syracuse	1	–	5	–	0	2	–	9	–	0
$ – Lambert Trophy Winner; Rankings from AP Poll

1982 NCAA Division I-A independents football records
	Conf.					Overall
Team	W		L		T	W		L		T
No. 1 Penn State		–		–		11	–	1	–	0
No. 10 Pittsburgh		–		–		9	–	3	–	0
No. 13 Florida State		–		–		9	–	3	–	0
No. 19 West Virginia		–		–		9	–	3	–	0
Boston College		–		–		8	–	3	–	1
Southwestern Louisiana		–		–		7	–	3	–	1
East Carolina		–		–		7	–	4	–	0
Miami (FL)		–		–		7	–	4	–	0
Southern Miss		–		–		7	–	4	–	0
Virginia Tech		–		–		7	–	4	–	0
Notre Dame		–		–		6	–	4	–	1
Cincinnati		–		–		6	–	5	–	0
Georgia Tech		–		–		6	–	5	–	0
Navy		–		–		6	–	5	–	0
Louisville		–		–		5	–	6	–	0
Rutgers		–		–		5	–	6	–	0
Army		–		–		4	–	7	–	0
South Carolina		–		–		4	–	7	–	0
Temple		–		–		4	–	7	–	0
Tulane		–		–		4	–	7	–	0
Syracuse		–		–		2	–	9	–	0
Memphis State		–		–		1	–	10	–	0
Rankings from AP Poll

The 1982 West Virginia Mountaineers football team represented West Virginia University in the 1982 NCAA Division I-A football season. It was the Mountaineers' 90th overall season and they competed as a Division I-A Independent. The team was led by head coach Don Nehlen, in his third year, and played their home games at Mountaineer Field in Morgantown, West Virginia. They finished the season with a record 9–3 and lost to Florida State in the Gator Bowl.

== Schedule ==
Date	Opponent	Rank	Site	TV	Result	Attendance	Source
September 11	at No. 9 Oklahoma		Oklahoma Memorial Stadium; Norman, OK		W 41–27	75,008	
September 18	Maryland	No. 17	Mountaineer Field; Morgantown, WV (rivalry)		W 19–18	56,042	
September 25	Richmond	No. 15	Mountaineer Field; Morgantown, WV		W 43–10	48,461	
October 2	at No. 2 Pittsburgh	No. 14	Pitt Stadium; Pittsburgh, PA (rivalry)	ABC	L 13–16	57,250	
October 9	No. 19 Boston College	No. 16	Mountaineer Field; Morgantown, WV		W 20–13	55,554	
October 16	at Virginia Tech	No. 13	Lane Stadium; Blacksburg, VA (rivalry)		W 16–6	52,300	
October 23	No. 9 Penn State	No. 13	Mountaineer Field; Morgantown, WV (rivalry)		L 0–24	60,958	
October 30	East Carolina	No. 18	Mountaineer Field; Morgantown, WV		W 30–3	50,616	
November 6	at Temple	No. 17	Veterans Stadium; Philadelphia, PA		W 20–17	28,968	
November 11	at Rutgers	No. 19	Giants Stadium; East Rutherford, NJ	TBS	W 44–17	27,132	
November 20	Syracuse	No. 16	Mountaineer Field; Morgantown, WV (rivalry)		W 26–0	48,456	
December 30	vs. Florida State	No. 10	Gator Bowl Stadium; Jacksonville, FL (Gator Bowl)	ABC	L 12–31	80,913	
Rankings from AP Poll released prior to the game

== Roster ==
1982 West Virginia Mountaineers football team roster
Players
Coaches
Offense

Pos.	#	Name	Class
QB	15	Jeff Hostetler	Jr
FB	36	Ron Wolfley	So
WR	48	Willie Drewrey	So

Defense

Pos.	#	Name	Class
LB	90	Darryl Talley	Sr

Special teams

Pos.	#	Name	Class
K	3	Paul Woodside	So
P	11	Stephen Superick	Fr

Head coach

- Don Nehlen

Coordinators/assistant coaches

Legend

- (C) Team captain
- (S) Suspended
- (I) Ineligible
- Injured
- Redshirt

== Season recap ==
Jeff Hostetler was the starting quarterback for the Mountaineers, leading the team with 1916 passing yards and 10 touchdowns. Leading the team in rushing was Curlin Beck, with 357 net yards. Darrell Miller led the team in receiving with 34 receptions for 565 yards.

The first game featured the Mountaineers against No. 9 Oklahoma. Though the team was losing by two touchdowns, the Mountaineers came back to upset the Sooners in Norman, 41–27. That was followed up with a 19–18 home victory over rival Maryland. The third game against Richmond was a blowout, in which the Mountaineers won 43–10.

Their first loss of the season came to their rival Pittsburgh, in the Backyard Brawl. Despite the loss, this was a breakout game for All-American linebacker Darryl Talley. He intercepted a Dan Marino pass and blocked a punt for a safety in West Virginia's 16–13 loss to the No. 2-rated Panthers. The 1982 game was one of just five times that both teams were nationally ranked: Pitt was rated No. 2 and West Virginia was No. 14 after their upset wins over Oklahoma and Maryland.

The Mountaineers rebounded with a 20–13 win over Boston College, and future NFL quarterback Doug Flutie. WVU traveled to Blacksburg to take on rival Virginia Tech, in a game in which the Mountaineers won 16–6.

The next week, the Mountaineers hosted the number 1 team in the nation, the Penn State Nittany Lions. Penn State's dominance continued, and they won in a 24–0 shutout. WVU rebounded once again with a blowout of its own against East Carolina, 30–3. The Mountaineers then traveled to Philadelphia, to take on Temple, where they narrowly won, 20–17.

West Virginia closed out the season with wins over Rutgers and Syracuse. The team finished with a 9–2 record, ranking No. 10. West Virginia was invited to the 1982 Gator Bowl against Florida State in Jacksonville, which they lost 31–12. Their final rankings were No. 19 in both the AP Poll and Coaches Poll.

== Awards and honors ==
- Darryl Talley, All-America selection
