= 1982 Boston College Eagles football team =

American college football season

1982 Boston College Eagles football

Tangerine Bowl, L 26–33 vs. Auburn
- Conference: Independent
- Record: 8–3–1
- Head coach: Jack Bicknell (2nd season)
- Defensive coordinator: Seymour "Red" Kelin (2nd season)
- Captains: Jack Belcher; Russell Joyner
- Home stadium: Alumni Stadium

1982 Major eastern college football independents records
	Conf.					Overall
Team	W		L		T	W		L		T
No. 1 Penn State $	6	–	0	–	0	11	–	1	–	0
No. 10 Pittsburgh	4	–	1	–	0	9	–	3	–	0
No. 19 West Virginia	4	–	2	–	0	9	–	3	–	0
Boston College	3	–	2	–	0	8	–	3	–	1
Rutgers	1	–	5	–	0	5	–	6	–	0
Temple	1	–	5	–	0	4	–	7	–	0
Syracuse	1	–	5	–	0	2	–	9	–	0
$ – Lambert Trophy Winner; Rankings from AP Poll

1982 NCAA Division I-A independents football records
	Conf.					Overall
Team	W		L		T	W		L		T
No. 1 Penn State		–		–		11	–	1	–	0
No. 10 Pittsburgh		–		–		9	–	3	–	0
No. 13 Florida State		–		–		9	–	3	–	0
No. 19 West Virginia		–		–		9	–	3	–	0
Boston College		–		–		8	–	3	–	1
Southwestern Louisiana		–		–		7	–	3	–	1
East Carolina		–		–		7	–	4	–	0
Miami (FL)		–		–		7	–	4	–	0
Southern Miss		–		–		7	–	4	–	0
Virginia Tech		–		–		7	–	4	–	0
Notre Dame		–		–		6	–	4	–	1
Cincinnati		–		–		6	–	5	–	0
Georgia Tech		–		–		6	–	5	–	0
Navy		–		–		6	–	5	–	0
Louisville		–		–		5	–	6	–	0
Rutgers		–		–		5	–	6	–	0
Army		–		–		4	–	7	–	0
South Carolina		–		–		4	–	7	–	0
Temple		–		–		4	–	7	–	0
Tulane		–		–		4	–	7	–	0
Syracuse		–		–		2	–	9	–	0
Memphis State		–		–		1	–	10	–	0
Rankings from AP Poll

The 1982 Boston College Eagles football team represented Boston College as an independent during the 1982 NCAA Division I-A football season. The Eagles were led by second-year head coach Jack Bicknell, and played their home games at Alumni Stadium in Chestnut Hill, Massachusetts. Sophomore quarterback Doug Flutie threw for over 2,700 yards, leading Boston College to the 1982 Tangerine Bowl, their first bowl game since 1942.

== Schedule ==
Date	Time	Opponent	Rank	Site	Result	Attendance	Source
September 4		at Texas A&M		Kyle Field; College Station, TX	W 38–16	55,177	
September 18		at No. 16 Clemson		Memorial Stadium; Clemson, SC (rivalry)	T 17–17	63,118	
September 25	2:00 p.m.	at Navy		Navy–Marine Corps Memorial Stadium; Annapolis, MD	W 31–0	23,016	
October 2		Temple	No. 18	Alumni Stadium; Chestnut Hill, MA	W 17–7	32,000	
October 9		at No. 16 West Virginia	No. 19	Mountaineer Field; Morgantown, WV	L 13–20	55,554	
October 16		Rutgers		Alumni Stadium; Chestnut Hill, MA	W 14–13	28,500	
October 23		at Army		Michie Stadium; West Point, NY	W 32–17	40,397	
October 30		No. 8 Penn State		Alumni Stadium; Chestnut Hill, MA	L 17–52	33,205	
November 6		at UMass		Warren McGuirk Alumni Stadium; Hadley, MA (rivalry)	W 34–21	16,023	
November 13		Syracuse		Alumni Stadium; Chestnut Hill, MA	W 20–13	21,500	
November 20		Holy Cross		Alumni Stadium; Chestnut Hill, MA (rivalry)	W 35–10	32,800	
December 18		vs. No. 18 Auburn		Orlando Stadium; Orlando, FL (Tangerine Bowl)	L 26–33	51,296	
Rankings from AP Poll released prior to the game; All times are in Eastern time

== Roster ==
1982 Boston College Eagles football team roster
Players
Coaches
Offense

Pos.	#	Name	Class
RB	32	Jim Browne	So
QB	22	Doug Flutie	So
OL	79	Mark MacDonald	So
WR	20	Gerard Phelan	So
WR	70	Steve Lively	Sr
C	62	Jack Belcher	Sr

Defense

Pos.	#	Name	Class
DB	17	Tony Thurman	So
LB	81	Andy Hemmer	Fr
DE	97	John Bosa	Fr
LB	41	David Pereira	So
DE	88	Russ Joyner	Sr

Special teams

Pos.	#	Name	Class

Head coach

- Jack Bicknell

Coordinators/assistant coaches

- Tom Coughlin – Quarterbacks

Legend

- (C) Team captain
- (S) Suspended
- (I) Ineligible
- Injured
- Redshirt
