= 1982 Gator Bowl =

- 38th Gator Bowl
| West Virginia Mountaineers | Florida State Seminoles |
| (9–2) | (8–3) |
| Independent | Independent |
| 12 | 31 |
| Head coach: Don Nehlen | Head coach: Bobby Bowden |
| AP / Coaches; 10 / 9 | AP / Coaches; NR / 20 |
| | 1 | 2 | 3 | 4 | Total |
|---|---|---|---|---|---|
| West Virginia | 0 | 6 | 0 | 6 | 12 |
| Florida State | 3 | 14 | 14 | 0 | 31 |
- Date: December 30, 1982
- Season: 1982
- Stadium: Gator Bowl Stadium
- Location: Jacksonville, Florida
- MVP: TB Greg Allen (Florida State); K Paul Woodside (West Virginia)
- Referee: Robert Aillet (SEC)
- Attendance: 80,913

United States TV coverage
- Network: ABC
- Announcers: Al Michaels; Lee Grosscup; Anne Simon

The 1982 Gator Bowl was an American college football bowl game played on December 30, 1982, at Gator Bowl Stadium in Jacksonville, Florida. The game pitted the West Virginia Mountaineers and the Florida State Seminoles.

== Background ==
West Virginia won their first three games (including a win against #9 Oklahoma) to be ranked at #14 heading into their rivalry game against #2 Pittsburgh. A close 16–13 loss made them fall to #16, but they rebounded with two straight victories to get to #13 heading into a home game versus #9 Penn State. A 24–0 loss to the eventual champion was their last loss of the regular season as they won the next four straight games to be invited to their second straight bowl game.

Florida State won seven straight games after starting the season 1–1 (with a loss to #2 Pittsburgh), rising to #7 heading into a non-conference matchup with #12 Louisiana State University. A 55–21 loss made them fall out of the polls, and they finished the season with a 13–10 loss to Florida. However, they were invited to the Gator Bowl, their first invite since 1967.

== Game summary ==
- Florida State – Hall 20 yard field goal
- West Virginia – Woodside 48 field goal
- Florida State – Allen 95 yard touchdown kickoff return (Hall kick)
- West Virginia – Woodside 34 yard field goal
- Florida State – McKinnon 27 yard touchdown pass from Williams (Hall kick)
- Florida State – Allen 29 yard touchdown run (Hall kick)
- Florida State – Allen 1 yard touchdown run (Hall kick)
- West Virginia – Miller 26 yard touchdown pass from White (conversion failed)

Greg Allen rushed for 138 yards on 15 carries while Paul Woodside kicked two field goals.

== Aftermath ==
The Mountaineers went to five more bowl games in the decade, including another Gator Bowl in 1989. They have returned five more times, though they have won only once, in 2007. Florida State then began a record 35 year bowl streak, which they went to a bowl game in every season from 1982 to 2017, including four Gator Bowls, the latter being Bowden's last game.
