= 1982 Navy Midshipmen football team =

American college football season

1982 Navy Midshipmen football
- Conference: Independent
- Record: 6–5
- Head coach: Gary Tranquill (1st season)
- Captains: Dennis McCall; Travis Wallington
- Home stadium: Navy–Marine Corps Memorial Stadium

1982 NCAA Division I-A independents football records
	Conf.					Overall
Team	W		L		T	W		L		T
No. 1 Penn State		–		–		11	–	1	–	0
No. 10 Pittsburgh		–		–		9	–	3	–	0
No. 13 Florida State		–		–		9	–	3	–	0
No. 19 West Virginia		–		–		9	–	3	–	0
Boston College		–		–		8	–	3	–	1
Southwestern Louisiana		–		–		7	–	3	–	1
East Carolina		–		–		7	–	4	–	0
Miami (FL)		–		–		7	–	4	–	0
Southern Miss		–		–		7	–	4	–	0
Virginia Tech		–		–		7	–	4	–	0
Notre Dame		–		–		6	–	4	–	1
Cincinnati		–		–		6	–	5	–	0
Georgia Tech		–		–		6	–	5	–	0
Navy		–		–		6	–	5	–	0
Louisville		–		–		5	–	6	–	0
Rutgers		–		–		5	–	6	–	0
Army		–		–		4	–	7	–	0
South Carolina		–		–		4	–	7	–	0
Temple		–		–		4	–	7	–	0
Tulane		–		–		4	–	7	–	0
Syracuse		–		–		2	–	9	–	0
Memphis State		–		–		1	–	10	–	0
Rankings from AP Poll

The 1982 Navy Midshipmen football team represented the United States Naval Academy (USNA) as an independent during the 1982 NCAA Division I-A football season. Led by first-year head coach Gary Tranquill, the Midshipmen compiled a record of 6–5. The team played home games at Navy–Marine Corps Memorial Stadium in Annapolis, Maryland.

== Schedule ==
Date	Time	Opponent	Site	Result	Attendance	Source
September 11	3:50 p.m.	Virginia	Navy–Marine Corps Memorial Stadium; Annapolis, MD	W 30–16	26,017	
September 18	8:02 p.m.	at Arkansas	War Memorial Stadium; Little Rock, AR	L 17–29	54,706	
September 25	2:00 p.m.	Boston College	Navy–Marine Corps Memorial Stadium; Annapolis, MD	L 0–31	23,016	
October 2		at Duke	Wallace Wade Stadium; Durham, NC	W 27–21	32,750	
October 9	3:30 p.m.	at Air Force	Falcon Stadium; Colorado Springs, CO (Commander-in-Chief's Trophy)	L 21–24	37,109	
October 16	2:00 p.m.	William & Mary	Navy–Marine Corps Memorial Stadium; Annapolis, MD	W 39–3	21,354	
October 23	2:00 p.m.	The Citadel^{†}	Navy–Marine Corps Memorial Stadium; Annapolis, MD	W 28–3	29,249	
October 30	1:30 p.m.	vs. Notre Dame	Giants Stadium; East Rutherford, NJ (rivalry)	L 10–27	72,201	
November 6	1:30 p.m.	at Syracuse	Carrier Dome; Syracuse, NY	W 20–18	43,443	
November 13	1:30 p.m.	at South Carolina	Williams–Brice Stadium; Columbia, SC	L 14–17	51,662	
December 4	12:40 p.m.	vs. Army	Veterans Stadium; Philadelphia, PA (Army–Navy Game)	W 24–7	67,307	
^{†}Homecoming; All times are in Eastern time

== Roster ==
1982 Navy Midshipmen football team roster
Players			Coaches
Offense: Pos. / # / Name / Class; RB / 30 / Napoleon McCallum / So	Defense: Pos. / # / Name / Class	Special teams: Pos. / # / Name / Class	Head coach: Gary Tranquill; Coordinators/assistant coaches: Nick Saban; Legend: (C) Team captain; (S) Suspended; (I) Ineligible; Injured; Redshirt
