= 1982 Army Cadets football team =

American college football season

1982 Army Cadets football
- Conference: Independent
- Record: 4–7
- Head coach: Ed Cavanaugh (3rd season)
- Captains: Gerald Walker; Mike Williams
- Home stadium: Michie Stadium

1982 NCAA Division I-A independents football records
	Conf.					Overall
Team	W		L		T	W		L		T
No. 1 Penn State		–		–		11	–	1	–	0
No. 10 Pittsburgh		–		–		9	–	3	–	0
No. 13 Florida State		–		–		9	–	3	–	0
No. 19 West Virginia		–		–		9	–	3	–	0
Boston College		–		–		8	–	3	–	1
Southwestern Louisiana		–		–		7	–	3	–	1
East Carolina		–		–		7	–	4	–	0
Miami (FL)		–		–		7	–	4	–	0
Southern Miss		–		–		7	–	4	–	0
Virginia Tech		–		–		7	–	4	–	0
Notre Dame		–		–		6	–	4	–	1
Cincinnati		–		–		6	–	5	–	0
Georgia Tech		–		–		6	–	5	–	0
Navy		–		–		6	–	5	–	0
Louisville		–		–		5	–	6	–	0
Rutgers		–		–		5	–	6	–	0
Army		–		–		4	–	7	–	0
South Carolina		–		–		4	–	7	–	0
Temple		–		–		4	–	7	–	0
Tulane		–		–		4	–	7	–	0
Syracuse		–		–		2	–	9	–	0
Memphis State		–		–		1	–	10	–	0
Rankings from AP Poll

The 1982 Army Cadets football team was an American football team that represented the United States Military Academy as an independent during the 1982 NCAA Division I-A football season. In their third season under head coach Ed Cavanaugh, the Cadets compiled a 4–7 record and were outscored by their opponents by a combined total of 271 to 164. In the annual Army–Navy Game, the Cadets lost to Navy by a 24–7 score.

== Schedule ==
Date	Time	Opponent	Site	TV	Result	Attendance	Source
September 11	2:31 p.m.	at Missouri	Faurot Field; Columbia, MO		L 10–23	50,233	
September 18	2:02 p.m.	Lafayette	Michie Stadium; West Point, NY		W 26–20	30,103–31,103	
September 25	1:00 p.m.	at No. 11 North Carolina	Kenan Memorial Stadium; Chapel Hill, NC		L 8–62	50,950	
October 2	2:00 p.m.	Harvard	Michie Stadium; West Point, NY		W 17–13	39,830	
October 9	2:00 p.m.	vs. Rutgers	Giants Stadium; East Rutherford, NJ		L 3–24	28,431	
October 16	1:31 p.m.	at Princeton	Palmer Stadium; Princeton, NJ		W 20–14	21,243	
October 23	2:01 p.m.	Boston College	Michie Stadium; West Point, NY		L 17–32	40,397	
October 30	2:00 p.m.	Columbia	Michie Stadium; West Point, NY		W 41–8	30,663	
November 6	1:32 p.m.	Air Force	Michie Stadium; West Point, NY (Commander-in-Chief's Trophy)		L 9–27	40,252	
November 13	1:32 p.m.	No. 8 Pittsburgh	Michie Stadium; West Point, NY	ESPN	L 6–24	40,475	
December 4	12:40 p.m.	vs. Navy	Veterans Stadium; Philadelphia, PA (Army–Navy Game)		L 7–24	67,307	
Rankings from AP Poll released prior to the game; All times are in Eastern time

== Roster ==
- LB Jim Mitroka
- Nate Sassaman
