= 1982 Southwestern Louisiana Ragin' Cajuns football team =

American college football season

1982 Southwestern Louisiana Ragin' Cajuns football
- Conference: Independent
- Record: 7–3–1
- Head coach: Sam Robertson (3rd season)
- Home stadium: Cajun Field

1982 NCAA Division I-A independents football records
	Conf.					Overall
Team	W		L		T	W		L		T
No. 1 Penn State		–		–		11	–	1	–	0
No. 10 Pittsburgh		–		–		9	–	3	–	0
No. 13 Florida State		–		–		9	–	3	–	0
No. 19 West Virginia		–		–		9	–	3	–	0
Boston College		–		–		8	–	3	–	1
Southwestern Louisiana		–		–		7	–	3	–	1
East Carolina		–		–		7	–	4	–	0
Miami (FL)		–		–		7	–	4	–	0
Southern Miss		–		–		7	–	4	–	0
Virginia Tech		–		–		7	–	4	–	0
Notre Dame		–		–		6	–	4	–	1
Cincinnati		–		–		6	–	5	–	0
Georgia Tech		–		–		6	–	5	–	0
Navy		–		–		6	–	5	–	0
Louisville		–		–		5	–	6	–	0
Rutgers		–		–		5	–	6	–	0
Army		–		–		4	–	7	–	0
South Carolina		–		–		4	–	7	–	0
Temple		–		–		4	–	7	–	0
Tulane		–		–		4	–	7	–	0
Syracuse		–		–		2	–	9	–	0
Memphis State		–		–		1	–	10	–	0
Rankings from AP Poll

The 1982 Southwestern Louisiana Ragin' Cajuns football team was an American football team that represented the University of Southwestern Louisiana (now known as the University of Louisiana at Lafayette) as an independent during the 1982 NCAA Division I-A football season. In their third year under head coach Sam Robertson, the team compiled a 7–3–1 record.

== Schedule ==
Date	Time	Opponent	Site	Result	Attendance	Source
September 11		at Rice	Rice Stadium; Houston, TX	W 21–14		
September 18		West Texas State	Cajun Field; Lafayette, LA	W 31–18	21,828	
September 25	1:30 p.m.	at North Texas State	Fouts Field; Denton, TX	W 31–14	6,000	
October 2		Southern Illinois	Cajun Field; Lafayette, LA	W 20–10	22,359	
October 9		Arkansas State	Cajun Field; Lafayette, LA	L 13–20		
October 16	1:30 p.m.	at UT Arlington	Maverick Stadium; Arlington, TX	L 29–30		
October 23		Lamar	Cajun Field; Lafayette, LA (rivalry)	W 24–0	19,023	
October 30		at Southern Miss	M. M. Roberts Stadium; Hattiesburg, MS	L 0–36		
November 6		Northeast Louisiana	Cajun Field; Lafayette, LA (rivalry)	W 40–26		
November 13		Louisiana Tech	Cajun Field; Lafayette, LA (rivalry)	W 29–19		
November 20		at McNeese State	Cowboy Stadium; Lake Charles, LA (Cajun Crown)	T 10–10	23,100	
All times are in Central time

== Roster ==
1982 Southwestern Louisiana Ragin' Cajuns football team roster
Players			Coaches
Offense: Pos. / # / Name / Class; WR / 16 / Clarence Verdin / Sr	Defense: Pos. / # / Name / Class	Special teams: Pos. / # / Name / Class	Head coach: Sam Robertson; Coordinators/assistant coaches Legend: (C) Team captain; (S) Suspended; (I) Ineligible; Injured; Redshirt
