= Frank R. Burns =

American football player and coach (1928–2012)

Biographical details
- Born: March 16, 1928
- Died: July 14, 2012 (aged 84); Holland, Pennsylvania, U.S.

Playing career
- 1945–1948: Rutgers
- Position: Quarterback

Coaching career (HC unless noted)
- 1949–1950: Rutgers (freshmen backfield)
- 1951–1952: Johns Hopkins
- 1955–1956: Rutgers (backfield)
- 1957–1960: Chatham HS (NJ)
- 1961–1972: Rutgers (assistant)
- 1973–1983: Rutgers

Head coaching record
- Overall: 84–52–2 (college)
- Bowls: 0–1

Accomplishments and honors

Championships
- 2 Middle Three (1973–1974)

Awards
- First-team All-Eastern (1947); Walter Camp Coach of the Year (1976)

Frank Robert Burns (March 16, 1928 – July 14, 2012) was an American football player and coach. He served as the head coach at Johns Hopkins University from 1951 to 1952 and at Rutgers University from 1973 to 1983, compiling a career college football record of 84–52–2. In 1978, Burns led the Rutgers Scarlet Knights to their first bowl game, the now-defunct Garden State Bowl.

== Playing career ==
Raised in Roselle Park, New Jersey, Burns played baseball, basketball and football at Roselle Park High School, serving as captain of the football and basketball teams, and winning state championships in both of those sports.

Burns played football as a quarterback at Rutgers University for four years, from 1945 to 1948. There he ran the T formation under head coach Harvey Harman, completing 117 of 270 passes for 2,389 yards and 35 touchdowns with a 27–7 career record. He was selected by the Philadelphia Eagles in the second round of the 1949 NFL draft, with the 19th overall pick, but never play in the National Football League (NFL).

== Coaching career ==
Burns coached football at Johns Hopkins University from 1951 to 1952 and at Rutgers University from 1973 to 1983. Burns has the second-most wins of any head coach in Rutgers Scarlet Knights football history with a record of 78–43–1 including an undefeated 11–0 campaign in 1976. He led Rutgers to a 13–7 upset victory over Tennessee in 1979.

During Burns's tenure as head coach, Rutgers began playing outside of its traditional schedule of Eastern teams such as Ivy League opponents, Colgate, and Lehigh. Burns was dismissed from Rutgers in 1983 after three consecutive losing seasons.

== Later life and death ==
Burns retired to the Twining Village Continual Care Retirement Village in Holland, Pennsylvania. He died there on July 14, 2012.

== Head coaching record ==
=== College ===
Year	Team	Overall	Conference	Standing	Bowl/playoffs	Coaches^{#}	AP^{°}
Johns Hopkins Blue Jays (Mason–Dixon Conference) (1951–1952)
1951	Johns Hopkins	2–5–1	0–2–1	5th			
1952	Johns Hopkins	4–4	1–2	T–3rd			
Johns Hopkins:		6–9–1	1–4–1				
Rutgers Scarlet Knights (Middle Three Conference) (1973–1975)
1973	Rutgers	6–5	2–0	1st			
1974	Rutgers	7–3–1	2–0	1st			
1975	Rutgers	9–2	1–1	2nd			
Rutgers Scarlet Knights (NCAA Division I/I-A Independent) (1976–1983)
1976	Rutgers	11–0				17	17
1977	Rutgers	8–3					
1978	Rutgers	9–3			L Garden State		
1979	Rutgers	8–3					
1980	Rutgers	7–4					
1981	Rutgers	5–6					
1982	Rutgers	5–6					
1983	Rutgers	3–8					
Rutgers:		78–43–1	5–1				
Total:		84–52–2					
National championship Conference title Conference division title or championship game berth
