= 1982 Pittsburgh Panthers football team =

American college football season

1982 Pittsburgh Panthers football

Cotton Bowl Classic, L 3–7 vs. SMU
- Conference: Independent

Ranking
- Coaches: No. 9
- AP: No. 10
- Record: 9–3
- Head coach: Foge Fazio (1st season)
- Offensive coordinator: Joe Daniels (1st season)
- Offensive scheme: West Coast
- Defensive coordinator: Charlie Bailey (1st season)
- Base defense: Multiple front
- Home stadium: Pitt Stadium

1982 Major eastern college football independents records
	Conf.					Overall
Team	W		L		T	W		L		T
No. 1 Penn State $	6	–	0	–	0	11	–	1	–	0
No. 10 Pittsburgh	4	–	1	–	0	9	–	3	–	0
No. 19 West Virginia	4	–	2	–	0	9	–	3	–	0
Boston College	3	–	2	–	0	8	–	3	–	1
Rutgers	1	–	5	–	0	5	–	6	–	0
Temple	1	–	5	–	0	4	–	7	–	0
Syracuse	1	–	5	–	0	2	–	9	–	0
$ – Lambert Trophy Winner; Rankings from AP Poll

1982 NCAA Division I-A independents football records
	Conf.					Overall
Team	W		L		T	W		L		T
No. 1 Penn State		–		–		11	–	1	–	0
No. 10 Pittsburgh		–		–		9	–	3	–	0
No. 13 Florida State		–		–		9	–	3	–	0
No. 19 West Virginia		–		–		9	–	3	–	0
Boston College		–		–		8	–	3	–	1
Southwestern Louisiana		–		–		7	–	3	–	1
East Carolina		–		–		7	–	4	–	0
Miami (FL)		–		–		7	–	4	–	0
Southern Miss		–		–		7	–	4	–	0
Virginia Tech		–		–		7	–	4	–	0
Notre Dame		–		–		6	–	4	–	1
Cincinnati		–		–		6	–	5	–	0
Georgia Tech		–		–		6	–	5	–	0
Navy		–		–		6	–	5	–	0
Louisville		–		–		5	–	6	–	0
Rutgers		–		–		5	–	6	–	0
Army		–		–		4	–	7	–	0
South Carolina		–		–		4	–	7	–	0
Temple		–		–		4	–	7	–	0
Tulane		–		–		4	–	7	–	0
Syracuse		–		–		2	–	9	–	0
Memphis State		–		–		1	–	10	–	0
Rankings from AP Poll

The 1982 Pittsburgh Panthers football team represented the University of Pittsburgh as an independent during the 1982 NCAA Division I-A football season.

== Schedule ==
Date	Time	Opponent	Rank	Site	TV	Result	Attendance	Source
September 9	9:00 p.m.	No. 5 North Carolina	No. 1	Three Rivers Stadium; Pittsburgh, PA	CBS	W 7–6	54,449	
September 18	7:00 p.m.	at Florida State	No. 2	Doak Campbell Stadium; Tallahassee, FL		W 37–17	56,236	
September 25	2:00 p.m.	at No. 19 Illinois	No. 3	Memorial Stadium; Champaign, IL		W 20–3	71,547	
October 2	12:30 p.m.	No. 14 West Virginia	No. 2	Pitt Stadium; Pittsburgh, PA (Backyard Brawl)	ABC	W 16–13	57,250	
October 16	1:30 p.m.	Temple^{†}	No. 3	Pitt Stadium; Pittsburgh, PA		W 38–7	57,250	
October 23	1:30 p.m.	at Syracuse	No. 2	Carrier Dome; Syracuse, NY (rivalry)		W 14–0	42,321	
October 30	1:31 p.m.	Louisville	No. 1	Pitt Stadium; Pittsburgh, PA		W 63–14	53,017	
November 6	1:30 p.m.	Notre Dame	No. 1	Pitt Stadium; Pittsburgh, PA (rivalry)		L 16–31	60,162	
November 13	1:30 p.m.	at Army	No. 8	Michie Stadium; West Point, NY	ESPN	W 24–6	40,475	
November 20	1:30 p.m.	Rutgers	No. 6	Pitt Stadium; Pittsburgh, PA	ESPN	W 52–6	46,728	
November 26	12:00 p.m.	at No. 2 Penn State	No. 5	Beaver Stadium; University Park, PA (rivalry)	ABC	L 10–19	85,522	
January 1, 1983	1:30 p.m.	vs. No. 4 SMU	No. 6	Cotton Bowl; Dallas, TX (Cotton Bowl Classic)	CBS	L 3–7	60,359	
^{†}Homecoming; Rankings from AP Poll released prior to the game; All times are in Eastern time

== Rankings ==
Ranking movements Legend: ██ Increase in ranking ██ Decrease in ranking — = Not ranked ( ) = First-place votes
	Week															
Poll	Pre	1	2	3	4	5	6	7	8	9	10	11	12	13	14	Final
AP	1 (36)	1 (33)	2 (16)	3 (10)	2 (19)	2 (15)	3 (9)	2 (17)	1 (21)	1 (48)	8	6	5	7	6	10
Coaches	1 (26)	—	1 (17)	1 (17)	1 (19)	2 (16)	3 (7)	2 (11)	2 (12)	1 (33)	7	6	5	7	6	9

== Game summaries ==
=== North Carolina ===
#5 North Carolina vs. #1 Pittsburgh

Team	1	2	3	4	Total
Tar Heels	0	3	0	3	6
• Panthers	0	0	7	0	7

- Date: September 9
- Location: Three Rivers Stadium, Pittsburgh, Pennsylvania
- Game attendance: 54,449
- Television network: CBS

Scoring summary
2	14:09	UNC	Brooks Barwick 39-yard field goal	UNC 3–0
3	8:34	PITT	Bryan Thomas 4-yard pass from Dan Marino (Snuffy Everett kick)	PITT 7–3
4	4:57	UNC	Rob Rogers 48-yard field goal	PITT 7–6

=== West Virginia ===
#14 West Virginia at #2 Pittsburgh

Team	1	2	3	4	Total
West Virginia	3	0	3	7	13
• Pittsburgh	0	0	0	16	16

- Date: October 2
- Location: Pitt Stadium, Pittsburgh, Pennsylvania
- Game attendance: 57,250

Scoring summary
Q1		WVU	Woodside 34 yard field goal	WVU 3–0
Q3		WVU	Woodside 29 yard field goal	WVU 6–0
Q4		WVU	Talley recovered blocked punt in end zone	WVU 13–0
Q4	10:52	PITT	Thomas 3 yard run (Schubert kick)	WVU 13–7
Q4	3:23	PITT	Dawkins 8 yard pass from Marino (Schubert kick)	PITT 14–13
Q4		PITT	Safety, Maas forced Hostetler out of end zone	PITT 16–13

=== At Penn State ===
Pittsburgh at Penn State

Team	1	2	3	4	Total
#5 Pittsburgh	0	7	0	3	10
• #2 Penn State	3	0	10	6	19

- Date: November 26
- Game attendance: 85,722
- Referee: Raymond Bower
- TV announcers (ABC): Al Michaels, Lee Grosscup, Tim Brant

=== Vs. SMU (Cotton Bowl) ===
#6 Pittsburgh vs. #4 SMU

Team	1	2	3	4	Total
Panthers	0	0	3	0	3
• Mustangs	0	0	7	0	7

- Date: October 2
- Location: Cotton Bowl, Dallas, TX
- Game attendance: 60,359
- Referee: Jimmy Harper
- TV announcers (CBS): Lindsey Nelson, Pat Haden, and Pat O'Brien

Scoring summary
3	Pitt	Eric Schubert 43-yard field goal	PITT 3–0
4	SMU	Lance McIlhenny 9-yard run (Harrell kick)	SMU 7–3

== Coaching staff ==
1982 Pittsburgh Panthers football staff
Coaching staff: Foge Fazio – Head coach; Joe Moore – Assistant head coach/offensive line; Charlie Bailey – Defensive coordinator/linebackers; Joe Daniels – Offensive coordinator/quarterbacks; Bob Davie – Defensive ends; Anthony Folinio – Defensive backs; Joe Naunchik – Receivers; Don Thompson – Defensive line; Andy Urbanic – Running backs	Support staff: Alex Kramer – Administrative assistant; Joe Duff – Recruiting doordinator; John Latina – Part-Time Assistant/tight ends; Jim Miceli – Part-Time Assistant/defensive line; Desmond Robinson – Part-Time Assistant/defensive backs; Mike Sherman – Part-Time Assistant/offensive line	Strength and conditioning staff: Buddy Morris – Weight training coordinator

== Roster ==
1982 Pittsburgh Panthers football team roster
Players
Coaches
Offense

Pos.	#	Name	Class
RB		Marc Bailey
RB		Bill Beach
RB		Mike Boyd
TE		John Brown
RB		Bill Callahan
RB		Dwight Collins
WR		Barry Compton
OT	75	Jimbo Covert	Sr
QB		Dan Daniels
WR		Julius Dawkins
OL		Rob Fada
OL	79	Bill Fralic	So
QB	13	Dan Marino	Sr
RB		Joe McCall
RB		Marlon McIntyre
TE		Mike Meehan
G	77	Ron Sams	Sr
RB		Darnell Stone
OL		Jim Sweeney
RB	44	Bryan Thomas	Sr
WR		Keith Williams
TE		Clint Wilson

Defense

Pos.	#	Name	Class
LB		Caesar Aldisert
LB		Michael Brooks
DB		Melvin Dean
LB	56	Chris Doleman	So
DB		Rick Dukovich
DB	5	Tom Flynn	Jr
DB		Troy Hill
LB		Charles "Yogi" Jones
LB		Rich Kraynak
DB	26	Tim Lewis	Sr
DT	71	Bill Maas	Jr
DL	63	Dave Puzzuoli	Sr
DL		Tim Quense
DB		Dan Short
LB		Al Wenglikowski
LB		Michael Woods

Special teams

Pos.	#	Name	Class
P		Tony Recchia
K	1	Eric Schubert

Head coach

- Foge Fazio

Coordinators/assistant coaches

Legend

- (C) Team captain
- (S) Suspended
- (I) Ineligible
- Injured
- Redshirt

== 1983 NFL draft ==
Player	Position	Round	Pick	NFL club
Jim Covert	Tackle	1	6	Chicago Bears
Tim Lewis	Defensive back	1	11	Green Bay Packers
Dan Marino	Quarterback	1	27	Miami Dolphins
Bryan Thomas	Running back	5	132	Green Bay Packers
Dave Puzzuoli	Defensive tackle	6	149	Cleveland Browns
Ron Sams	Guard	6	160	Green Bay Packers
Rich Kraynak	Linebacker	8	201	Philadelphia Eagles
Rob Fada	Guard	9	230	Chicago Bears
Julius Dawkins	Wide receiver	12	320	Buffalo Bills
