= 1982 Florida State Seminoles football team =

American college football season

1982 Florida State Seminoles football

Gator Bowl champion

Gator Bowl, W 31–12 vs. West Virginia
- Conference: Independent

Ranking
- Coaches: No. 10
- AP: No. 13
- Record: 9–3
- Head coach: Bobby Bowden (7th season)
- Offensive coordinator: George Henshaw (4th season)
- Offensive scheme: Pro-style
- Defensive coordinator: Jack Stanton (7th season)
- Base defense: 4–3
- Captain: Game captains
- Home stadium: Doak Campbell Stadium

1982 NCAA Division I-A independents football records
	Conf.					Overall
Team	W		L		T	W		L		T
No. 1 Penn State		–		–		11	–	1	–	0
No. 10 Pittsburgh		–		–		9	–	3	–	0
No. 13 Florida State		–		–		9	–	3	–	0
No. 19 West Virginia		–		–		9	–	3	–	0
Boston College		–		–		8	–	3	–	1
Southwestern Louisiana		–		–		7	–	3	–	1
East Carolina		–		–		7	–	4	–	0
Miami (FL)		–		–		7	–	4	–	0
Southern Miss		–		–		7	–	4	–	0
Virginia Tech		–		–		7	–	4	–	0
Notre Dame		–		–		6	–	4	–	1
Cincinnati		–		–		6	–	5	–	0
Georgia Tech		–		–		6	–	5	–	0
Navy		–		–		6	–	5	–	0
Louisville		–		–		5	–	6	–	0
Rutgers		–		–		5	–	6	–	0
Army		–		–		4	–	7	–	0
South Carolina		–		–		4	–	7	–	0
Temple		–		–		4	–	7	–	0
Tulane		–		–		4	–	7	–	0
Syracuse		–		–		2	–	9	–	0
Memphis State		–		–		1	–	10	–	0
Rankings from AP Poll

The 1982 Florida State Seminoles football team represented Florida State University as an independent during the 1982 NCAA Division I-A football season. Led by seventh-year head coach Bobby Bowden, the Seminoles compiled a record of 9–3 with a win in the Gator Bowl over West Virginia. Florida State played home games at Doak Campbell Stadium in Tallahassee, Florida.

== Schedule ==
Date	Time	Opponent	Rank	Site	TV	Result	Attendance	Source
September 4	7:00 p.m.	Cincinnati		Doak Campbell Stadium; Tallahassee, FL		W 38–31	49,253	
September 18	7:00 p.m.	No. 2 Pittsburgh		Doak Campbell Stadium; Tallahassee, FL		L 17–37	56,236	
September 25	8:00 p.m.	at Southern Miss		M. M. Roberts Stadium; Hattiesburg, MS		W 24–17	32,591	
October 2	1:30 p.m.	at Ohio State		Ohio Stadium; Columbus, OH		W 34–17	89,491	
October 9	7:00 p.m.	Southern Illinois^{†}		Doak Campbell Stadium; Tallahassee, FL		W 59–8	51,233	
October 16	7:00 p.m.	East Carolina	No. 19	Doak Campbell Stadium; Tallahassee, FL		W 56-17	46,283	
October 30	12:38 p.m.	at No. 16 Miami (FL)	No. 14	Miami Orange Bowl; Miami, FL (rivalry)	CBS	W 24–7	54,962	
November 6	1:30 p.m.	at South Carolina	No. 12	Williams–Brice Stadium; Columbia, SC		W 56–26	62,821	
November 13	8:12 p.m.	Louisville	No. 9	Doak Campbell Stadium; Tallahassee, FL	TBS	W 49–14	51,233	
November 20	8:30 p.m.	at No. 12 LSU	No. 7	Tiger Stadium; Baton Rouge, LA		L 21–55	76,637	
December 4	7:00 p.m.	Florida	No. 15	Doak Campbell Stadium; Tallahassee, FL (rivalry)		L 10–13	57,369	
December 30	1:00 p.m.	vs. No. 10 West Virginia		Gator Bowl Stadium; Jacksonville, FL (Gator Bowl)	ABC	W 31–12	80,913	
^{†}Homecoming; Rankings from AP Poll released prior to the game; All times are in Eastern time

== Roster ==
1982 Florida State Seminoles football team roster
Players
Coaches
Offense

Pos.	#	Name	Class
WR	6	Dennis McKinnon	Sr

Defense

Pos.	#	Name	Class
DT	76	Alphonso Carreker	Jr
DB	24	Harvey Clayton	Sr

Special teams

Pos.	#	Name	Class

Head coach

- Bobby Bowden

Coordinators/assistant coaches

Legend

- (C) Team captain
- (S) Suspended
- (I) Ineligible
- Injured
- Redshirt
