= 1982 Notre Dame Fighting Irish football team =

American college football season

1982 Notre Dame Fighting Irish football
- Conference: Independent
- Record: 6–4–1
- Head coach: Gerry Faust (2nd season)
- Offensive coordinator: Tom Lichtenberg (2nd season)
- Defensive coordinator: Jim Johnson
- MVP: Dave Duerson
- Captains: Phil Carter; Dave Duerson; Mark Zavagnin
- Home stadium: Notre Dame Stadium

1982 NCAA Division I-A independents football records
| | Conf. | | | | | Overall |
| Team | W | | L | | T | W | | L | | T |
|---|---|---|---|---|---|---|---|---|---|---|
| No. 1 Penn State | | – | | – | | 11 | – | 1 | – | 0 |
| No. 10 Pittsburgh | | – | | – | | 9 | – | 3 | – | 0 |
| No. 13 Florida State | | – | | – | | 9 | – | 3 | – | 0 |
| No. 19 West Virginia | | – | | – | | 9 | – | 3 | – | 0 |
| Boston College | | – | | – | | 8 | – | 3 | – | 1 |
| Southwestern Louisiana | | – | | – | | 7 | – | 3 | – | 1 |
| East Carolina | | – | | – | | 7 | – | 4 | – | 0 |
| Miami (FL) | | – | | – | | 7 | – | 4 | – | 0 |
| Southern Miss | | – | | – | | 7 | – | 4 | – | 0 |
| Virginia Tech | | – | | – | | 7 | – | 4 | – | 0 |
| Notre Dame | | – | | – | | 6 | – | 4 | – | 1 |
| Cincinnati | | – | | – | | 6 | – | 5 | – | 0 |
| Georgia Tech | | – | | – | | 6 | – | 5 | – | 0 |
| Navy | | – | | – | | 6 | – | 5 | – | 0 |
| Louisville | | – | | – | | 5 | – | 6 | – | 0 |
| Rutgers | | – | | – | | 5 | – | 6 | – | 0 |
| Army | | – | | – | | 4 | – | 7 | – | 0 |
| South Carolina | | – | | – | | 4 | – | 7 | – | 0 |
| Temple | | – | | – | | 4 | – | 7 | – | 0 |
| Tulane | | – | | – | | 4 | – | 7 | – | 0 |
| Syracuse | | – | | – | | 2 | – | 9 | – | 0 |
| Memphis State | | – | | – | | 1 | – | 10 | – | 0 |
Rankings from AP Poll

The 1982 Notre Dame Fighting Irish football team was an American football team that represented the University of Notre Dame as an independent during the 1982 NCAA Division I-A football season. In their second year under head coach Gerry Faust, the Irish compiled a 6–4–1 record, outscored opponents by a total of 206 to 174, and were unranked for the second consecutive year in both the final AP and UPI polls. They won the first four games, including matches with No. 10 Michigan and No. 17 Miami (FL), and were ranked No. 9. They then lost to unranked Arizona, rebounded with a victory over No. 1 Pittsburgh, and concluded the season with three consecutive losses to No. 5 Penn State, Air Force, and No. 17 USC.

Tight end Tony Hunter and defensive back Dave Duerson received first-team honors on the 1982 All-America college football team. The team's statistical leaders included quarterback Blair Kiel (1,273 passing yards), running back and co-captain Phil Carter (715 rushing yards), wide receiver Joe Howard (524 receiving yards, 18.7-yard average), kicker Mike Johnston (76 points scored, 19 of 19 PAT, 19 of 22 field goals), and linebacker Mark Zavagnin (113 tackles).

The team played its home games at Notre Dame Stadium in Notre Dame, Indiana.

== Schedule ==
| Date | Time | Opponent | Rank | Site | TV | Result | Attendance | Source |
|---|---|---|---|---|---|---|---|---|
| September 18 | 9:00 p.m. | No. 10 Michigan | No. 20 | Notre Dame Stadium; Notre Dame, IN (rivalry) | ABC | W 23–17 | 59,075 | |
| September 25 | 2:30 p.m. | Purdue | No. 10 | Notre Dame Stadium; Notre Dame, IN (rivalry) | | W 28–14 | 59,075 | |
| October 2 | 1:00 p.m. | at Michigan State | No. 11 | Spartan Stadium; East Lansing, MI (rivalry) | | W 11–3 | 77,119 | |
| October 9 | 1:31 p.m. | No. 17 Miami (FL) | No. 10 | Notre Dame Stadium; Notre Dame, IN (rivalry) | | W 16–14 | 59,075 | |
| October 16 | 2:30 p.m. | Arizona | No. 9 | Notre Dame Stadium; Notre Dame, IN | | L 13–16 | 59,075 | |
| October 23 | 4:00 p.m. | at Oregon | No. 15 | Autzen Stadium; Eugene, OR | | T 13–13 | 40,381 | |
| October 30 | 1:30 p.m. | vs. Navy | | Giants Stadium; East Rutherford, NJ (rivalry) | | W 27–10 | 72,201 | |
| November 6 | 1:30 p.m. | at No. 1 Pittsburgh | | Pitt Stadium; Pittsburgh, PA (rivalry) | | W 31–16 | 60,162 | |
| November 13 | 3:50 p.m. | No. 5 Penn State | No. 13 | Notre Dame Stadium; Notre Dame, IN (rivalry) | ABC | L 14–24 | 59,075 | |
| November 20 | 3:00 p.m. | at Air Force | No. 18 | Falcon Stadium; Colorado Springs, CO (rivalry) | | L 17–30 | 46,712 | |
| November 27 | 3:50 p.m. | at No. 17 USC | | Los Angeles Memorial Coliseum; Los Angeles, CA (rivalry) | CBS | L 13–17 | 76,459 | |
Rankings from AP Poll released prior to the game; All times are in Eastern time

== Game summaries ==
=== Michigan ===
| Team | 1 | 2 | 3 | 4 | Total |
|---|---|---|---|---|---|
| Michigan | 0 | 0 | 7 | 10 | 17 |
| • Notre Dame | 3 | 10 | 10 | 0 | 23 |

- Date: September 18
- Location: Notre Dame Stadium, South Bend, Indiana
- Referee: Tom Quinn ( Big Ten)
- TV announcers (ABC): Keith Jackson & Frank Broyles

Scoring summary
| 1 | ND | Johnston 35-yard field goal | ND 3-0 |
| 2 | ND | Moriarty 24-yard run (Johnston kick) | ND 10-0 |
| 2 | ND | Johnston 37-yard field goal | ND 13-0 |
| 3 | MICH | Carter 72-yard punt return (Haji-Sheikh kick) | ND 13-7 |
| 3 | ND | Johnston 41-yard field goal | ND 16-7 |
| 3 | ND | Bell 10-yard run (Johnston kick) | ND 23-7 |
| 4 | MICH | Haji-Sheikh 42-yard field goal | ND 23-10 |
| 4 | MICH | Rogers 39-yard pass from S. Smith (Haji-Sheikh kick) | ND 23-17 |

The first night game played at Notre Dame Stadium.

=== Purdue ===
| Team | 1 | 2 | 3 | 4 | Total |
|---|---|---|---|---|---|
| Purdue | 0 | 14 | 0 | 0 | 14 |
| • Notre Dame | 7 | 7 | 7 | 7 | 28 |

- Date: September 25
- Location: Notre Dame Stadium • South Bend, Indiana

Scoring summary
| 1 | ND | Moriarty 2-yard run (Johnston kick) | Notre Dame 7-0 |
| 2 | ND | Moriarty 3-yard run (Johnston kick) | Notre Dame 14-0 |
| 2 | PUR | King 2-yard pass from Campbell (Clark kick) | Notre Dame 14-7 |
| 2 | PUR | Benson 5-yard pass from Campbell (Clark kick) | Tie 14-14 |
| 3 | ND | Carter 6-yard run (Johnston kick) | Notre Dame 21-14 |
| 4 | ND | Carter 10-yard run (Johnston kick) | Notre Dame 28-14 |

=== Michigan State ===
| Team | 1 | 2 | 3 | 4 | Total |
|---|---|---|---|---|---|
| • Notre Dame | 2 | 9 | 0 | 0 | 11 |
| Michigan St | 0 | 0 | 3 | 0 | 3 |

- Date: October 2
- Location: Spartan Stadium, East Lansing, MI
- Game attendance: 77,119

Scoring summary
| Q1 | ND | Leister tackled in end zone | ND 2–0 |
| Q2 | ND | Johnston 33 yard field goal | ND 5–0 |
| Q2 | ND | Johnston 29 yard field goal | ND 8–0 |
| Q2 | ND | Johnston 42 yard field goal | ND 11–0 |
| Q3 | MSU | Mojsiejenko 50 yard field goal | ND 11–3 |

Notre Dame's first victory in a game without scoring a touchdown since 1970 versus LSU.

=== Miami (FL) ===
| Team | 1 | 2 | 3 | 4 | Total |
|---|---|---|---|---|---|
| Miami (FL) | 0 | 0 | 7 | 7 | 14 |
| • Notre Dame | 0 | 7 | 3 | 6 | 16 |

- Date: October 9
- Location: Notre Dame Stadium • South Bend, Indiana
- Game attendance: 59,075

Scoring summary
| Q2 | 2:25 | ND | Kiel 6 yard run (Johnson kick) | ND 7–0 |
| Q3 | 11:47 | Miami | Richt 1 yard pass to Dennison (Davis kick) | Tie 7-7 |
| Q3 | 2:53 | ND | Johnson 29 yard field goal | ND 10-7 |
| Q4 | 13:03 | Miami | Richt 79 yard pass to Belk (Davis kick) | Miami 14-10 |
| Q4 | 8:27 | ND | Johnson 42 yard field goal | Miami 14-13 |
| Q4 | :11 | ND | Johnson 32 yard field goal | ND 16-14 |

=== Arizona ===
| Team | 1 | 2 | 3 | 4 | Total |
|---|---|---|---|---|---|
| • Arizona | 0 | 0 | 6 | 10 | 16 |
| Notre Dame | 10 | 0 | 0 | 3 | 13 |

- Date: October 16
- Location: Notre Dame Stadium • South Bend, Indiana
- Game attendance: 59,075

Scoring summary
| Q1 | ND | Johnson 22 yard field goal | ND 3–0 |
| Q1 | ND | Pinkett 25 yard run (Johnson kick) | ND 10-0 |
| Q3 | Ariz | Zendejas 38 yard field goal | ND 10-3 |
| Q3 | Ariz | Zendejas 32 yard field goal | ND 10-6 |
| Q4 | ND | Johnson 43 yard field goal | ND 13-6 |
| Q4 | Ariz | Freeman 1 yard run (Sendejas kick) | 13-13 |
| Q4 | Ariz | Zendejas 48 yard field goal | Ariz 16-13 |

=== Oregon ===
| Team | 1 | 2 | 3 | 4 | Total |
|---|---|---|---|---|---|
| Notre Dame | 7 | 0 | 3 | 3 | 13 |
| Oregon | 3 | 0 | 3 | 7 | 13 |

- Date: October 23
- Location: Autzen Stadium • Eugene, OR
- Game attendance: 40,381

Scoring summary
| Q1 | 7:27 | ND | Pinkett 6 yard run (Johnson kick) | ND 7–0 |
| Q1 | 3:52 | Oregon | Lee 37 yard field goal | ND 7-3 |
| Q3 | 9:37 | Oregon | Lee 39 yard field goal | ND 7-6 |
| Q3 | :46 | ND | Johnson 42 yard field goal | ND 10-6 |
| Q4 | 10:27 | Oregon | Jones 6 yard run (Lee kick) | Oregon 13-10 |
| Q4 | :11 | ND | Johnson 25 yard field goal | Tie 13-13 |

=== Navy ===
| Team | 1 | 2 | 3 | 4 | Total |
|---|---|---|---|---|---|
| • Notre Dame | 0 | 13 | 14 | 0 | 27 |
| Navy | 0 | 0 | 2 | 8 | 10 |

- Date: October 30
- Location: Giants Stadium • East Rutherford, New Jersey
- Game attendance: 72,201

Scoring summary
| 2 | 7:28 | ND | Smith 3-yard pass from Kiel (Johnston kick) | Notre Dame 7-0 |
| 2 | | ND | Johnston 40-yard field goal | Notre Dame 10-0 |
| 2 | | ND | Johnston 48-yard field goal | Notre Dame 13-0 |
| 3 | | NAVY | Safety, Kiel tackled in end zone | Notre Dame 13-2 |
| 3 | | ND | Moriarty 18-yard pass from Kiel (Johnston kick) | Notre Dame 20-2 |
| 3 | | ND | Pinkett 12-yard run (Johnston kick) | Notre Dame 27-2 |
| 4 | | NAVY | Cebak 26-yard pass from Torquinio (Clouse pass from Torquinio) | Notre Dame 27-10 |

=== At Air Force ===
| | 1 | 2 | 3 | 4 | Total |
|---|---|---|---|---|---|
| Notre Dame | 0 | 0 | 3 | 14 | 17 |
| Air Force | 7 | 10 | 7 | 6 | 30 |

== Roster ==
1982 Notre Dame Fighting Irish football team roster
Players
Coaches
Offense

| Pos. | # | Name | Class |
|---|---|---|---|
| TE | 82 | Mark Bavaro | So |
| RB | 28 | Greg Bell | Jr |
| RB | | Mark Brooks |
| RB | 22 | Phil Carter (C) | Sr |
| G | 78 | Randy Ellis | Sr |
| WR | | Mike Favorite |
| C | 57 | Mark Fischer | Sr |
| RB | | Lester Flemons |
| OT | 65 | Greg Golic | Jr |
| WR | | Mike Haywood |
| WR | 24 | Joe Howard | So |
| TE | 85 | Tony Hunter | Sr |
| WR | | Milt Jackson |
| QB | 12 | Ken Karcher | So |
| G | 63 | Mike Kelley | So |
| QB | 5 | Blair Kiel | Jr |
| QB | 2 | Tim Walz | Fr |
| OL | | Neil Maune |
| RB | 39 | Larry Moriarty | Sr |
| RB | | Rodney Morris |
| QB | 6 | Jim O'Hara | Sr |
| WR | | Van Pearcy |
| OT | 69 | Mike Perrino | Fr |
| RB | 20 | Allen Pinkett | Fr |
| G | 62 | Ron Plantz | Fr |
| OT | 52 | John Putzstuck | Sr |
| OT | 74 | Mike Shiner | Jr |
| RB | 32 | Chris Smith | So |
| WR | 1 | Chris Stone | Sr |
| TE | | John Sweeney |
| G | 64 | Tom Thayer | Sr |
| G | 75 | Larry Williams | So |

Defense

| Pos. | # | Name | Class |
|---|---|---|---|
| DT | 37 | Joe Autry | Jr |
| CB | 9 | Chris Brown | Jr |
| DT | 91 | Bob Clasby | Sr |
| DT | 71 | Eric Dorsey | Fr |
| LB | 43 | Rick DiBernardo | Fr |
| DT | 92 | Greg Dingens | Fr |
| DB | 19 | Justin Driscoll | Sr |
| S | 23 | Dave Duerson | Sr |
| LB | 58 | Tony Furjanic | Fr |
| DE | 78 | Mike Gann | So |
| DE | 55 | Mike Golic | So |
| DL | | Kevin Griffith |
| DT | 93 | Shawn Heffern | Fr |
| S | 27 | Joe Johnson | So |
| LB | | Mike Larkin |
| LB | 37 | Rick Naylor | Jr |
| LB | 51 | Joe Rudzinski | Sr |
| S | 41 | Dave Schuster | Sr |
| CB | 30 | Stacey Toran | Jr |
| LB | 36 | Ron Weissenhofer | Fr |
| LB | | Mark Zavagnin |

Special teams

| Pos. | # | Name | Class |
|---|---|---|---|
| K | 4 | Mike Johnson | Sr |
| P | 3 | Mike Viracola | Jr |

Head coach

- Gerry Faust

Coordinators/assistant coaches

- Greg Blache (DL)
- Brian Boulac (Ast HC)
- Jim Higgins (OL)
- Ron Hudson (WR)
- Jim Johnson (DC)
- George Kelly (LB)
- Tom Lichtenberg (OC/Recruiting Coordinator)
- Jay Robertson (DT)
- Carl Selmer (OL)
- Ross Stephenson (Volunteer/Scouting)

Legend

- (C) Team captain
- (S) Suspended
- (I) Ineligible
- Injured
- Redshirt

== Statistics ==
- Passing: Blair Kiel 118/219, 1273 Yds, 3 TD
- Rushing: Phil Carter 179 Rush, 715 Yds, 2 TD
- Receiving: Tony Hunter 42 Rec, 507 Yds
- Scoring: Mike Johnston 76 Pts

== Awards ==
- Safety Dave Duerson - 1st team All-American (College & Pro Football Newsweekly, Football News, Football Writers Association of America)
- Tight end Tony Hunter - 1st team All-American (Newspaper Enterprise Association)
- Kicker Mike Johnston - 3rd team All-American (Football News)
- Linebacker Mark Zavagnin - 2nd team All-American (Football News), 3rd Team All-American (Associated Press)
