= Rex Dockery =

American football player and coach (1942–1983)

- Dockery, left, during his time at Memphis

Biographical details
- Born: February 7, 1942; Cleveland, Tennessee, U.S.
- Died: December 12, 1983 (aged 41); Lawrenceburg, Tennessee, U.S.

Playing career
- 1961–1964: Tennessee
- Position: Tackle

Coaching career (HC unless noted)
- 1966–1967: Harriman HS (TN)
- 1968–1969: Morristown East HS (TN)
- 1970–1971: Tennessee (assistant)
- 1972: Georgia Tech (assistant)
- 1973–1974: Vanderbilt (assistant)
- 1975–1977: Texas Tech (OC)
- 1978–1980: Texas Tech
- 1981–1983: Memphis State

Head coaching record
- Overall: 23–40–3 (college)

Accomplishments and honors

Awards
- SWC Coach of the Year (1978)

John "Rex" Dockery (February 7, 1942 – December 12, 1983) was an American football player and coach. He served as the head football coach at Texas Tech University from 1978 to 1980 and Memphis State University—now known as the University of Memphis—from 1981 to 1983, compiling a career college football head coaching record of 23–40–3. Dockery was killed in a plane crash in 1983.

== Early life ==
Dockery was born on February 7, 1942, in Cleveland, Tennessee. He was a 1960 graduate of Bradley Central High School in Cleveland. In high school, he played several sports and was an all-state guard on the football team. He went on to receive a degree from the University of Tennessee where he played four years of football for the Vols.

== Coaching career ==
Dockery got his coaching start as a graduate assistant at Tennessee. He then coached football at Harriman High School the 1966 and 1967 seasons. The following year, he took the head coaching job at Morristown East High School and led the team to a state championship in 1969.

=== Tennessee, Georgia Tech, and Vanderbilt ===
Moving to the college ranks, Dockery became an assistant under Bill Battle at Tennessee. During his time there, he coached Phillip Fulmer and was responsible for recruiting Condredge Holloway. In 1972, Dockery became the offensive line coach at Georgia Tech, where he was reunited with his high school teammate Steve Sloan.

Dockery followed Sloan to Vanderbilt in 1973. When Sloan went on to Texas Tech two years later, Dockery went with him as offensive coordinator.

=== Texas Tech ===
When Steve Sloan left Texas Tech for Ole Miss in 1978, Dockery became the team's head coach. He coached at Texas Tech from 1978 to 1980, compiling a 15–16–2 record, and being named the Southwest Conference Coach of the Year in 1978.

=== Memphis State ===
Dockery served as the head football coach for the Memphis Tigers from 1981 to 1983. He had an 8–24–1 record at Memphis State (now University of Memphis), starting his tenure with back-to-back 1–10 seasons and going 6–4–1 in his final season.

== Death and honors ==
Dockery was killed in a plane crash on December 12, 1983, in Lawrenceburg, Tennessee, en route to an appearance before the Quarterback Club there. Also killed in the crash were Memphis State freshman Charles Greenhill, offensive coordinator Chris Faros, and booster Glenn Jones. On December 13, 1984, Dockery's widow Wallene filed a lawsuit against Memphis State University seeking unpaid contractual payments.

In December 1983, the playing surface at the Liberty Bowl Memorial Stadium was named Rex Dockery Field. Dockery's high school also presents The Rex Dockery Award in his memory.

== Personal life ==
Dockery and his wife Wallene had two sons, Trey and Dee. Dee Dockery currently serves as a physician at the Campbell Clinic Medical Center in Memphis.

== Head coaching record ==
=== College ===
Year	Team	Overall	Conference	Standing	Bowl/playoffs
Texas Tech Red Raiders (Southwest Conference) (1978–1980)
1978	Texas Tech	7–4	5–3	4th	
1979	Texas Tech	3–6–2	2–5–1	7th	
1980	Texas Tech	5–6	3–5	T–6th	
Texas Tec:		15–16–2	10–13–1		
Memphis State Tigers (NCAA Division I-A Independent) (1981–1983)
1981	Memphis State	1–10			
1982	Memphis State	1–10			
1983	Memphis State	6–4–1			
Memphis State:		8–24–1			
Total:		23–40–3			
