= Andy Dickerson (offensive lineman, born 1963) =

No. 64
- Position: Offensive lineman

Personal information
- Born: March 10, 1963 (age 63); Philadelphia, Pennsylvania, U.S.
- Listed height: 6 ft 5 in (1.96 m)
- Listed weight: 260 lb (118 kg)

Career information
- High school: Cypress Lake (Cypress Lake, Florida)
- College: Miami (1981–1983); USC (1984–1985); Cal Lutheran (1985–1986)
- NFL draft: 1987: undrafted

Career history
- Los Angeles Raiders (1987)

Awards and highlights
- National champion (1983)

Career NFL statistics
- Games played: 1
- Stats at Pro Football Reference

Andrew Charles Dickerson (born March 10, 1963) is an American former professional football player who was an offensive lineman for one season in the National Football League (NFL) for the Los Angeles Raiders. He played college football for the Miami Hurricanes and Cal Lutheran Kingsmen, and also had a non-playing stint with the USC Trojans.

== Early life and college career ==
Dickerson was born on March 10, 1963, in Philadelphia, Pennsylvania. He attended Cypress Lake High School in Fort Myers, Florida, and was their second NFL alumnus. He played for the school's basketball and football teams, being a tight end and defensive end in football. As a senior, he helped the basketball team win The News-Press tournament and the district championship. He committed to play college football for the Miami Hurricanes over offers from the Florida State Seminoles and Florida Gators.

Dickerson moved to offensive tackle at Miami and played for the junior varsity team as a freshman in 1981. He redshirted as a sophomore in 1982 but lost his extra year of eligibility by accidentally playing in a late-season game; he did not realize that playing in the game would cost him a year of eligibility. In 1983, he did not make any starts but still saw extensive playing time as Miami won the national championship.

The Miami coaching staff changed in 1984 and Dickerson learned that he would not see much playing time. He then transferred to play for the USC Trojans. After sitting out the 1984 season due to transfer rules, Dickerson entered training camp in 1985 preparing to play for USC, but was told that his NCAA Division I eligibility had expired. Division I players were allowed 10 consecutive semesters of eligibility, but Division II players could have non-consecutive college tenures (Dickerson did not attend school for a time in the 1983–1984 school year). He thus transferred again to the Cal Lutheran Kingsmen, a Division II team, although he was ineligible to play in the 1985 season. Dickerson finally had his chance to play in 1986, but was limited after having a knee injury on the first day of practice and a torn tendon in his ankle a week later.

== Professional career ==
Dickerson was signed as a replacement player by the Los Angeles Raiders during the 1987 NFL strike and appeared in one game – a 30–14 loss to the Denver Broncos as a backup offensive guard. In doing so he became one of only eight Cal Lutheran players all-time to make it to the NFL. He was one of the replacement players who served as extras in the television show 1st & Ten. He did not appear in any games after the strike.
