= Battle for the Bell (Southern Miss–Tulane) =

American college football rivalry game

- Southern Miss Golden Eagles Tulane Green Wave
- Sport: Football
- First meeting: October 13, 1979; Tulane, 20–19
- Latest meeting: September 16, 2026; Tulane, 24–20
- Next meeting: September 11, 2027, in Hattiesburg

Statistics
- Total meetings: 35
- All-time series: Southern Miss leads 24–11
- Largest victory: Southern Miss 59, Tulane 6 (November 17, 2001)
- Longest win streak: Southern Miss, 6 (1987–1992), (2003–2010)
- Current win streak: Tulane, 2 (2023–present)

Locations of Southern Miss and Tulane

The Battle for the Bell is an American college football rivalry game between the University of Southern Mississippi Golden Eagles and Tulane University Green Wave football teams. The two schools are located about 110 miles from each other (Southern Miss in Hattiesburg, Mississippi, and Tulane in New Orleans, Louisiana) via Interstate 10 and Interstate 59, making for a heated game.

Through the teams' most recent meeting in September 2026, Southern Miss holds a 24–11 lead in the series.

== History ==
The two teams played annually from 1979 through 2006; both programs were independent through 1995, and both competed as members of Conference USA (C-USA) starting in 1996. In 1999, the series became a trophy game with the addition of the Bell. Following a reconfiguration of C-USA in 2006, the teams no longer met annually; they played in 2009 and 2010 as a cross-divisional conference match-up. The series then went on hiatus due to Tulane's move to the American Athletic Conference (AAC) in July 2014.

On April 13, 2017, the schools announced a return of the rivalry—a four-game football series between 2022 and 2027, the first game scheduled for Yulman Stadium in New Orleans.

Prior to the regular-season series resuming, the two teams met in the 2020 Armed Forces Bowl (January) played in Fort Worth, Texas, which was a 30–13 Tulane victory. The bell trophy, which had been in the possession of Southern Miss since 2003, was transferred to the Green Wave after the game.

== Game results ==
Southern Miss victories	Tulane victories

No.	Date	Location	Winner	Score
1	October 13, 1979	Hattiesburg	Tulane	20–19
2	September 6, 1980	New Orleans	Southern Miss	17–14
3	September 19, 1981	Hattiesburg	Southern Miss	21–3
4	October 16, 1982	New Orleans	Southern Miss	22–10
5	October 22, 1983	Hattiesburg	Tulane	14–7
6	October 13, 1984	New Orleans	Tulane	35–7
7	November 23, 1985	Hattiesburg	Southern Miss	24–6
8	October 25, 1986	New Orleans	Tulane	35–20
9	September 19, 1987	Hattiesburg	Southern Miss	31–24
10	October 8, 1988	New Orleans	Southern Miss	38–13
11	October 7, 1989	Hattiesburg	Southern Miss	30–21
12	October 13, 1990	New Orleans	Southern Miss	20–14
13	October 19, 1991	Hattiesburg	Southern Miss	47–14
14	October 15, 1992	New Orleans	Southern Miss	17–7
15	November 6, 1993	Hattiesburg	Tulane	17–15
16	September 3, 1994	New Orleans	Southern Miss	25–10
17	September 30, 1995	Hattiesburg	Southern Miss	45–0
18	October 26, 1996	New Orleans	#24 Southern Miss	31–28
19	October 25, 1997	Hattiesburg	Southern Miss	34–13

No.	Date	Location	Winner	Score
20	October 3, 1998	New Orleans	#25 Tulane	21–7
21	September 6, 1999	Hattiesburg	Southern Miss	48–14
22	October 14, 2000	New Orleans	#16 Southern Miss	56–24
23	November 17, 2001	Hattiesburg	Southern Miss	59–6
24	November 23, 2002	New Orleans	Tulane	31–10
25	November 15, 2003	Hattiesburg	Southern Miss	28–14
26	September 25, 2004	New Orleans	Southern Miss	32–14
27	November 26, 2005	Hattiesburg	Southern Miss	26–7
28	November 11, 2006	New Orleans	Southern Miss	31–3
29	October 24, 2009	Hattiesburg	Southern Miss	43–6
30	November 6, 2010	New Orleans	Southern Miss	46–30
31	January 4, 2020	Fort Worth, TX	Tulane	30–13
32	September 26, 2020	Hattiesburg	Tulane	66–24
33	September 24, 2022	New Orleans	Southern Miss	27–24
34	September 16, 2023	Hattiesburg	Tulane	21–3
35	September 26, 2026	New Orleans	Tulane	24–21
36	September 11, 2027	Hattiesburg		
Series: Southern Miss leads 24–11

== See also ==
- List of NCAA college football rivalry games
