= 1982 NCAA Division I-A football rankings =

- Season: 1982
- Bowl season: 1982–83 bowl games
- Preseason No. 1: Pittsburgh
- End of season champions: Penn State

Two human polls comprised the 1982 National Collegiate Athletic Association (NCAA) Division I-A football rankings. Unlike most sports, college football's governing body, the NCAA, does not bestow a national championship, instead that title is bestowed by one or more different polling agencies. There are two main weekly polls that begin in the preseason—the AP Poll and the Coaches Poll.

== Legend ==
	Increase in ranking
	Decrease in ranking
	Not ranked previous week
	National champion
(#–#)	Win–loss record
(Italics)	Number of first place votes
т	Tied with team above or below also with this symbol

== AP Poll ==
	Preseason Aug 29	Week 1 Sep 6	Week 2 Sep 13	Week 3 Sep 20	Week 4 Sep 27	Week 5 Oct 4	Week 6 Oct 11	Week 7 Oct 18	Week 8 Oct 25	Week 9 Nov 1	Week 10 Nov 8	Week 11 Nov 15	Week 12 Nov 22	Week 13 Nov 29	Week 14 Dec 6	Week 15 (Final) Jan 3	
1.	Pittsburgh (36)	Pittsburgh (0–0)	Washington (1–0)	Washington (2–0)	Washington (3–0)	Washington (4–0)	Washington (5–0)	Washington (6–0)	Pittsburgh (6–0)	Pittsburgh (7–0)	Georgia (9–0)	Georgia (10–0)	Georgia (10–0)	Georgia (11–0)	Georgia (11–0)	Penn State (11–1) (44)	1.
2.	Washington (15)	Washington (0–0)	Pittsburgh (1–0)	Nebraska (2–0)	Pittsburgh (3–0)	Pittsburgh (4–0)	Alabama (5–0)	Pittsburgh (5–0)	Washington (7–0)	SMU (8–0)	SMU (9–0)	SMU (10–0)	Penn State (9–1)	Penn State (10–1)	Penn State (10–1)	SMU (11–0–1) (9)	2.
3.	Alabama (3)	Nebraska (0–0)	Nebraska (1–0)	Pittsburgh (2–0)	Penn State (4–0)	Penn State (4–0)	Pittsburgh (4–0)	Georgia (6–0)	Georgia (7–0)	Georgia (8–0)	Arizona State (9–0)	Penn State (9–1)	Nebraska (9–1)	Nebraska (10–1)	Nebraska (11–1)	Nebraska (12–1) (2)	3.
4.	Nebraska (2)	Alabama (0–0)	Alabama (1–0)	Alabama (2–0)	Florida (3–0)	Alabama (4–0)	Georgia (5–0)	SMU (6–0)	SMU (7–0)	Arizona State (8–0)	Nebraska (8–1)	Nebraska (9–1)	SMU (10–0–1)	SMU (10–0–1)	SMU (10–0–1)	Georgia (11–1)	4.
5.	North Carolina (2)	North Carolina (0–0)	Florida (2–0)	Florida (2–0)	Alabama (3–0)	Georgia (4–0)	SMU (5–0)	Nebraska (5–1)	Arkansas (6–0)	Arkansas (7–0)	Penn State (8–1)	Washington (9–1)	Pittsburgh (9–1)	UCLA (9–1–1)	UCLA (9–1–1)	UCLA (10–1–1)	5.
6.	SMU	Georgia (0–0)	SMU (1–0)	SMU (2–0)	Georgia (3–0)	SMU (4–0)	Nebraska (4–1)	Arkansas (5–0)	Nebraska (6–1)	Nebraska (7–1)	LSU (7–0–1)	Pittsburgh (8–1)	Arizona State (9–1)	Arkansas (8–1–1)	Pittsburgh (9–2)	Arizona State (10–2)	6.
7.	Georgia	Penn State (1–0)	Georgia (2–0)	Georgia (2–0)	SMU (3–0)	Nebraska (3–1)	Arkansas (5–0)	Alabama (5–1)	Arizona State (7–0)	Penn State (7–1)	Washington (8–1)	Florida State (8–1)	LSU (8–1–1)	Pittsburgh (9–2)	Clemson (9–1–1)	Washington (10–2)	7.
8.	Penn State	SMU (0–0)	Penn State (2–0)	Penn State (3–0)	Nebraska (2–1)	UCLA (4–0)	Penn State (4–1)	Arizona State (7–0)	Penn State (6–1)	Alabama (7–1)	Pittsburgh (7–1)	Arizona State (9–1)	UCLA (9–1–1)	Clemson (9–1–1)	Texas (9–2)	Clemson (9–1–1)	8.
9.	Oklahoma	Oklahoma (0–0)	Arkansas (1–0)	Arkansas (2–0)	UCLA (3–0)	Arkansas (4–0)	Notre Dame (4–0)	Penn State (5–1)	Alabama (6–1)	UCLA (7–0–1)	Florida State (7–1)	Arkansas (8–1)	Arkansas (8–1–1)	Washington (9–2)	Washington (9–2)	Arkansas (9–2–1)	9.
10.	USC	USC (0–0)	Michigan (1–0)	Notre Dame (1–0)	Arkansas (3–0)	Notre Dame (3–0)	Arizona State (6–0)	North Carolina (5–1)	North Carolina (5–1)	Washington (7–1)	Arkansas (7–1)	Clemson (7–1–1)	Clemson (8–1–1)	West Virginia (9–2)	West Virginia (9–2)	Pittsburgh (9–3)	10.
11.	Clemson	Florida (1–0)	North Carolina (0–1)	North Carolina (1–1)	Notre Dame (2–0)	Arizona State (5–0)	North Carolina (4–1)	UCLA (5–0–1)	UCLA (6–0–1)	LSU (6–0–1)	Clemson (6–1–1)	UCLA (8–1–1)	Oklahoma (8–2)	Arizona State (9–2)	Arizona State (9–2)	LSU (8–3–1)	11.
12.	Michigan	Michigan (0–0)	Ohio State (1–0)	UCLA (2–0)	North Carolina (2–1)	North Carolina (3–1)	UCLA (4–0–1)	USC (4–1)	USC (5–1)	Florida State (6–1)	UCLA (7–1–1)	LSU (7–1–1)	West Virginia (9–2)	Texas (8–2)	Oklahoma (8–3)	Ohio State (9–3)	12.
13.	Arkansas	Arkansas (0–0)	Arizona State (2–0)	Ohio State (2–0)	Arizona State (4–0)	Texas (3–0)	West Virginia (4–1)	West Virginia (5–1)	LSU (5–0–1)	Clemson (5–1–1)	Notre Dame (6–1–1)	Michigan (8–2)	Washington (9–2)	LSU (8–2–1)	LSU (8–2–1)	Florida State (9–3)	13.
14.	Ohio State	Ohio State (0–0)	UCLA (1–0)	Arizona State (3–0)	West Virginia (3–0)	Florida (3–1)	USC (3–1)	LSU (4–0–1)	Florida State (5–1)	Oklahoma (6–2)	Michigan (7–2)	Oklahoma (8–2)	Texas (7–2)	Oklahoma (8–3)	Arkansas (8–2–1)	Auburn (9–3)	14.
15.	Miami (FL)	Arizona State (1–0)	Miami (FL) (1–1)	West Virginia (2–0)	Texas (2–0)	USC (3–1)	Illinois (5–1)	Notre Dame (4–1)	Clemson (5–1–1)	Michigan (6–2)	Oklahoma (7–2)	USC (7–2)	Florida State (8–2)	Florida State (8–2)	USC (8–3)	USC (8–3)	15.
16.	Florida	Clemson (0–1)	Clemson (0–1)	Miami (FL) (2–1)	USC (2–1)	West Virginia (3–1)	LSU (3–0–1)	Miami (FL) (5–2)	Miami (FL) (5–2)	USC (5–2)	USC (6–2)	West Virginia (8–2)	Maryland (8–3)	USC (8–3)	Maryland (8–3)	Oklahoma (8–4)	16.
17.	Texas	Texas (0–0)	West Virginia (1–0)	Texas (1–0)	Miami (FL) (3–1)	Miami (FL) (4–1)	Miami (FL) (4–2)	Florida State (5–1)	Oklahoma (5–2)	West Virginia (6–2)	Alabama (7–2)	Texas (6–2)	USC (7–3)	Maryland (8–3)	Ohio State (8–3)	Texas (9–3)	17.
18.	Notre Dame	UCLA (0–0)	Texas (0–0)	USC (1–1)	Boston College (2–0–1)	LSU (3–0)	Texas (3–1)	Clemson (4–1–1)	West Virginia (5–2)	North Carolina (5–2)	Maryland (7–2)	Notre Dame (6–2–1)	Ohio State (8–3)	Ohio State (8–3)	Auburn (8–3)	North Carolina (8–4)	18.
19.	Arizona State	Miami (FL) (0–1)	USC (0–1)	Illinois (3–0)	Minnesota (3–0)	Boston College (3–0–1)	Florida State (4–1)	Texas (3–1)	Auburn (6–1)	Maryland (6–2)	West Virginia (7–2)	Maryland (7–3)	Tulsa (10–1)	Auburn (8–3)	Michigan (8–3)	West Virginia (9–3)	19.
20.	UCLA	Notre Dame (0–0)	Notre Dame (0–0)	Michigan (1–1)	Auburn (3–0)	Illinois (4–1)	Clemson (3–1–1)	Oklahoma (4–2)	Michigan (5–2)	Florida (5–2)	Texas (5–2)	Tulsa (9–1)	Michigan (8–3)	Michigan (8–3)	Tulsa (10–1)	Maryland (8–4)	20.
	Preseason Aug 29	Week 1 Sep 6	Week 2 Sep 13	Week 3 Sep 20	Week 4 Sep 27	Week 5 Oct 4	Week 6 Oct 11	Week 7 Oct 18	Week 8 Oct 25	Week 9 Nov 1	Week 10 Nov 8	Week 11 Nov 15	Week 12 Nov 22	Week 13 Nov 29	Week 14 Dec 6	Week 15 (Final) Jan 3	
		None	Dropped: Oklahoma	Dropped: Clemson	Dropped: Ohio State; Illinois; Michigan	Dropped: Minnesota; Auburn	Dropped: Florida; Boston College	Dropped: Illinois	Dropped: Notre Dame; Texas	Dropped: Miami; Auburn	Dropped: North Carolina; Florida	Dropped: Alabama	Dropped: Notre Dame	Dropped: Tulsa	Dropped: Florida State	Dropped: Michigan; Tulsa	

== Coaches Poll ==
	Preseason Aug 29	Week 1 Sep 13	Week 2 Sep 20	Week 3 Sep 27	Week 4 Oct 4	Week 5 Oct 11	Week 6 Oct 18	Week 7 Oct 25	Week 8 Nov 1	Week 9 Nov 8	Week 10 Nov 15	Week 11 Nov 22	Week 12 Nov 29	Week 13 Dec 7	Week 14 (Final) Jan 3	
1.	Pittsburgh (26)	Pittsburgh (1–0) (17)	Pittsburgh (2–0) (17)	Pittsburgh (3–0) (19)	Washington (4–0) (16)	Washington (5–0) (25)	Washington (6–0) (29)	Washington (7–0) (24)	Pittsburgh (7–0) (33)	Georgia (9–0) (22)	Georgia (10–0) (28)	Georgia (10–0) (37)	Georgia (11–0) (37)	Georgia (11–0) (34)	Penn State (11–1) (33)	1.
2.	Washington (8)	Washington (1–0) (12)	Nebraska (2–0) (8)	Washington (3–0) (18)	Pittsburgh (4–0) (16)	Alabama (5–0) (10)	Pittsburgh (5–0) (11)	Pittsburgh (6–0) (12)	Georgia (8–0) (1)	SMU (9–0) (18)	SMU (10–0) (9)	Penn State (9–1) (2)	Penn State (10–1) (2)	Penn State (10–1) (3)	SMU (11–0–1) (4)	2.
3.	Nebraska (3)	Nebraska (1–0) (6)	Washington (2–0) (13)	Penn State (4–0) (3)	Penn State (4–0) (6)	Pittsburgh (4–0) (7)	Georgia (6–0)	Georgia (7–0) (1)	SMU (8–0) (5)	Nebraska (8–1) (1)	Penn State (9–1) (3)	Nebraska (9–1) (3)	Nebraska (10–1) (3)	Nebraska (11–1) (3)	Nebraska (12–1)	3.
4.	Alabama (3)	Alabama (1–0) (6)	Alabama (2–0) (4)	Alabama (3–0) (2)	Alabama (4–0) (2)	Georgia (5–0)	SMU (6–0)	SMU (7–0) (3)	Arkansas (7–0) (2)	Penn State (8–1) (1)	Nebraska (9–1) (2)	SMU (10–0–1)	SMU (10–0–1)	SMU (10–0–1)	Georgia (11–1)	4.
5.	Penn State	Georgia (2–0)	Penn State (3–0)	Florida (3–0)	Georgia (4–0)	SMU (5–0)	Nebraska (5–1) (1)	Arkansas (6–0) (1)	Nebraska (7–1) (1)	LSU (7–0–1)	Washington (9–1)	Pittsburgh (9–1)	UCLA (9–1–1)	UCLA (9–1–1)	UCLA (10–1–1)	5.
6.	North Carolina (1)	SMU (1–0) (1)	Georgia (2–0)	Georgia (3–0)	SMU (4–0) (1)	Nebraska (4–1)	Arkansas (5–0)	Nebraska (6–1) (1)	Penn State (7–1)	Washington (8–1)	Pittsburgh (8–1)	LSU (8–1–1)	Arkansas (8–1–1)	Pittsburgh (9–2)	Arizona State (10–2)	6.
7.	Georgia	Florida (2–0)	Florida (2–0)	SMU (3–0)	Nebraska (3–1)	Arkansas (5–0)	North Carolina (5–1)	Penn State (6–1)	Alabama (7–1)	Pittsburgh (7–1)	Florida State (8–1)	Arkansas (8–1–1)	Pittsburgh (9–2)	Texas (9–2)	Washington (10–2)	7.
8.	Oklahoma (1)	Penn State (2–0)	SMU (2–0)	Nebraska (2–1)	UCLA (4–0) (1)	North Carolina (4–1)	Penn State (5–1) (1)	North Carolina (5–1)	UCLA (7–0–1)	Florida State (7–1)	Arkansas (8–1)	UCLA (9–1–1)	West Virginia (9–2)	Washington (9–2)	Arkansas (9–2–1)	8.
9.	Clemson	Michigan (1–0)	Arkansas (2–0)	UCLA (3–0)	Arkansas (4–0)	Notre Dame (4–0)	Alabama (5–1)	Alabama (6–1)	Washington (7–1)	Arkansas (7–1)	Oklahoma (8–2)	Oklahoma (8–2)	Washington (9–2)	West Virginia (9–2)	Pittsburgh (9–3)	9.
10.	Michigan	Arkansas (1–0)	North Carolina (1–1)	North Carolina (2–1)	North Carolina (3–1)	Penn State (4–1)	UCLA (5–0–1)	UCLA (6–0–1)	LSU (6–0–1)	Clemson (6–1–1)	Michigan (8–2)	Clemson (8–1–1)	Texas (8–2)	Oklahoma (8–3)	Florida State (9–3)	10.
11.	SMU	North Carolina (0–1)	Ohio State (2–0)	Arkansas (3–0)	Notre Dame (3–0)	UCLA (4–0–1)	West Virginia (5–1)	LSU (5–0–1)	Florida State (6–1)	Oklahoma (7–2)	UCLA (8–1–1)	West Virginia (9–2)	Oklahoma (8–3)	Arizona State (9–2)	LSU (8–3–1)	11.
12.	Arkansas	Ohio State (1–0)	Notre Dame (1–0)	Notre Dame (2–0)	Texas (3–0)	West Virginia (4–1)	LSU (4–0–1)	Florida State (5–1)	Oklahoma (6–2)	Michigan (7–2)	Clemson (7–1–1)	Washington (9–2)	Arizona State (9–2)	Arkansas (8–2–1)	Ohio State (9–3)	12.
13.	Texas	Clemson (0–1)	UCLA (2–0)	Texas (2–0)	Florida (3–1)	Illinois (5–1)	Notre Dame (4–1)	Clemson (5–1–1)	North Carolina (5–2)	UCLA (7–1–1)	LSU (7–1–1)	Texas (7–2)	LSU (8–2–1)	LSU (8–2–1)	North Carolina (8–4)	13.
14.	Ohio State	Texas (0–0)	West Virginia (2–0)	West Virginia (3–0)	LSU (3–0)	LSU (3–0–1)	Florida State (5–1)	Miami (FL) (5–2)	Clemson (5–1–1)	Notre Dame (6–1–1)	West Virginia (8–2)	Florida State (8–2)	Florida State (8–2)	Maryland (8–3)	Auburn (9–3)	14.
15.	Miami (FL)	West Virginia (1–0)	Texas (1–0)	Miami (FL) (3–1)	Boston College (3–0–1)	Florida State (4–1)	Texas (3–1)	Oklahoma (5–2)	Michigan (6–2)	Alabama (7–2)	Texas (6–2)	Maryland (8–3)	Maryland (8–3)	Auburn (8–3)	Michigan (8–4)	15.
16.	Florida	Miami (FL) (1–1)	Miami (FL) (2–1)	Boston College (2–0–1)	Miami (FL) (4–1)	Texas (3–1)	Miami (FL) (5–2)	Michigan (5–2)	West Virginia (6–2)	Maryland (7–2)	Notre Dame (6–2–1)	Tulsa (10–1)	Ohio State (8–3)	Ohio State (8–3)	Oklahoma (8–4)	16.
17.	UCLA	UCLA (1–0)	Mississippi State (3–0)	Auburn (3–0)	West Virginia (3–1)	Clemson (3–1–1)	Clemson (4–1–1)	West Virginia (5–2)	Maryland (6–2)	West Virginia (7–2)	Tulsa (9–1)	Ohio State (8–3)	Auburn (8–3)	Michigan (8–3)	Alabama (8–4) т	17.
18.	Notre Dame	Mississippi State (2–0)	Illinois (3–0)	Mississippi State (3–1)	Stanford (3–1)	Oklahoma (3–2)	Oklahoma (4–2)	Auburn (6–1)	Florida (5–2)	Texas (5–2)	Maryland (7–3)	Michigan (8–3)	Michigan (8–3)	Tulsa (10–1)	Texas (9–3) т	18.
19.	BYU	Notre Dame (0–0)	Boston College (1–0–1)	Clemson (1–1–1)	Illinois (3–1)	Florida (3–2)	Michigan (4–2)	Florida (4–2)	Texas (4–2)	North Carolina (5–3)	North Carolina (6–3)	BYU (8–3)	Tulsa (10–1)	Florida (8–3)	West Virginia (9–3)	19.
20.	Texas A&M	BYU (1–1)	BYU (1–1)	San Jose State (3–0) т; Minnesota (3–0) т	Clemson (2–1–1)	Miami (FL) (4–2)	Florida (4–2)	Boston College (5–1–1)	Notre Dame (5–1–1)	Tulsa (8–1)	Alabama (7–3) т; New Mexico (9–1) т	Alabama (7–3) т; New Mexico (10–1) т	Boston College (8–2–1) т; BYU (8–3) т	Florida State (8–3)	Maryland (8–4)	20.
	Preseason Aug 29	Week 1 Sep 13	Week 2 Sep 20	Week 3 Sep 27	Week 4 Oct 4	Week 5 Oct 11	Week 6 Oct 18	Week 7 Oct 25	Week 8 Nov 1	Week 9 Nov 8	Week 10 Nov 15	Week 11 Nov 22	Week 12 Nov 29	Week 13 Dec 7	Week 14 (Final) Jan 3	
		Dropped: Oklahoma; Texas A&M	Dropped: Michigan; Clemson	Dropped: Ohio State; Illinois; BYU	Dropped: Auburn; Mississippi State; San Jose State; Minnesota	Dropped: Boston College; Stanford	Dropped: Illinois	Dropped: Notre Dame; Texas	Dropped: Miami (FL); Auburn; Boston College	Dropped: Florida	None	Dropped: Notre Dame; North Carolina	Dropped: Clemson; Alabama; New Mexico	Dropped: Boston College; BYU	Dropped: Tulsa; Florida	
