= 1982–83 NCAA football bowl games =

College football postseason game series

- Season: 1982
- Number of bowls: 16
- All-star games: 2
- Bowl games: December 17, 1982 – January 1, 1983
- Champions: Penn State Nittany Lions
Bowl record by conference
Conference	Bowls	Record	Final AP poll
SEC	7	2–5 (0.286)	3
Big Ten	5	3–2 (0.600)	1
Independent	5	2–3 (0.400)	4
Big 8	3	1–2 (0.333)	2
Pac-10	3	3–0 (1.000)	4
SWC	3	2–1 (0.667)	3
ACC	2	1–1 (0.500)	3
WAC	2	1–1 (0.500)	0
MAC^	1	0–1 (0.000)	0
PCAA	1	1–0 (1.000)	0
- Note: ^The Mac was FCS this year.

The 1982–83 NCAA football bowl games featured 16 games starting early in December and ending on January 1, 1983. The Aloha Bowl was introduced this year. The California Bowl this year was the only bowl game between a FCS team and a FBS team ever.

== Schedule ==
Date	Game	Site	Matchup
Dec 11	Independence Bowl	Independence Stadium; Shreveport, LA	Wisconsin 14, Kansas State 10
Dec 17	Holiday Bowl	Jack Murphy Stadium; San Diego, CA	Ohio State 47, BYU 17
Dec 18	Tangerine Bowl	Orlando Stadium; Orlando, FL	Auburn 33, Boston College 26
Dec 18	California Bowl	Bulldog Stadium; Fresno, CA	Fresno State 29, Bowling Green 28
Dec 18	Sun Bowl	Sun Bowl; El Paso, TX	North Carolina 26, Texas 10
Dec 25	Aloha Bowl	Aloha Stadium; Honolulu, HI	Washington 26, Maryland 20
Dec 29	Liberty Bowl	Liberty Bowl Memorial Stadium; Memphis, TN	Alabama 21, Illinois 15
Dec 30	Gator Bowl	Gator Bowl Stadium; Jacksonville, FL	Florida State 31, West Virginia 12
Dec 31	Hall of Fame Classic	Legion Field; Birmingham, AL	Air Force 36, Vanderbilt 28
Dec 31	Astro-Bluebonnet Bowl	Astrodome; Houston, TX	Arkansas 28, Florida 24
Dec 31	Peach Bowl	Atlanta-Fulton County Stadium; Atlanta, GA	Iowa 28, Tennessee 22
Jan 1	Fiesta Bowl	Sun Devil Stadium; Tempe, AZ	Arizona State 32, Oklahoma 21
Jan 1	Cotton Bowl	Cotton Bowl; Dallas, TX	SMU 7, Pittsburgh 3
Jan 1	Rose Bowl	Rose Bowl; Pasadena, CA	UCLA 24, Michigan 14
Jan 1	Orange Bowl	Orange Bowl; Miami, FL	Nebraska 21, LSU 20
Jan 1	Sugar Bowl	Louisiana Superdome; New Orleans, LA	Penn State 27, Georgia 23
