= Jerry Stovall =

American football player, coach and administrator (1941–2026)

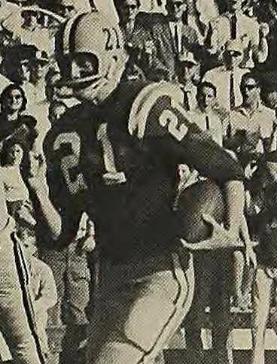
- Stovall returning a kickoff for LSU in 1962

No. 21
- Positions: Safety, punter

Personal information
- Born: April 30, 1941; West Monroe, Louisiana, U.S.
- Died: August 31, 2026 (aged 85)
- Listed height: 6 ft 2 in (1.88 m)
- Listed weight: 205 lb (93 kg)

Career information
- High school: West Monroe
- College: LSU (1960–1962)
- NFL draft: 1963: 1st round, 2nd overall pick
- AFL draft: 1963: 1st round, 3rd overall pick

Career history

Playing
- St. Louis Cardinals (1963–1971)

Coaching
- LSU (1980–1983) Head coach

Operations
- Louisiana Tech (1990–1994) Athletic director

Awards and highlights
- Second-team All-Pro (1966); 3× Pro Bowl (1966, 1967, 1969); Unanimous All-American (1962); SEC Player of the Year (1962); 2× First-team All-SEC (1961, 1962); LSU Tigers No. 21 retired

Career NFL statistics
- Interceptions: 18
- Interception yards: 243
- Fumble recoveries: 6
- Defensive touchdowns: 2
- Punts: 87
- Punting yards: 3,498
- Punting average: 40.2
- Longest punt: 69
- Stats at Pro Football Reference

Head coaching record
- Career: 22–21–2 (.511)
- College Football Hall of Fame

Jerry Lane Stovall (April 30, 1941 – August 31, 2026), nicknamed "Mr. Everything", was an American football player, coach and college athletics administrator. He played college football for the LSU Tigers, where he was a unanimous selection to the 1962 College Football All-America Team as a halfback. Stovall played professionally as a safety and punter in the National Football League (NFL) with the St. Louis Cardinals from 1963 to 1971. Stovall served as the head football coach at his alma mater, LSU, from 1980 to 1983, compiling a record of 22–21–2 in four seasons and leading the 1982 team to an appearance in the 1983 Orange Bowl. He was the athletic director at Louisiana Tech University from 1990 to 1993. He is the only player in LSU history to be named a unanimous All-American (1962), be selected to the college football hall of fame (2010), be selected as a first round pick (1963), and to be selected to the pro bowl (1966, 1967, and 1969).

== Early life and college ==
Born and raised in West Monroe, Louisiana, Stovall graduated from West Monroe High School in 1959. He played college football at Louisiana State University (LSU) in Baton Rouge, succeeding Heisman Trophy winner Billy Cannon as the Tigers' halfback. Stovall served a multitude of roles for the Tigers, including running back, defensive back, return specialist, and punter. His primary position was left halfback, which in the days of one-platoon football was both a running back and defensive back.

His 57-yard run in 1961 helped LSU defeat arch-rival Ole Miss by a score of 10–7 in a major upset.

Stovall was a unanimous choice for the All-America team of 1962 at halfback. He won the Walter Camp Memorial Trophy as the nation's best back, was named SEC Player of the Year, and was the runner-up for the Heisman Trophy. He finished 89 votes behind Oregon State's Terry Baker.

== Professional career ==
Stovall was the second overall pick in the first round of the 1963 NFL draft, selected by the St. Louis Cardinals. He was also the third overall pick of the 1963 American Football League draft. The Cardinals converted him to full-time defensive back. He was regarded as one of the top rookies in the league in 1963. During his nine seasons with St. Louis, Stovall had 18 interceptions in 97 games, and was selected to the Pro Bowl after the 1966, 1967, and 1969 seasons.

== Coaching career ==
After his NFL career, Stovall became a college football assistant coach. He eventually returned to LSU, as an assistant for head coach Charlie McClendon. Stovall became LSU's head coach as an emergency hire after new head coach Bo Rein died when his plane depressurized and disappeared over the Atlantic Ocean.

In Stovall's four years with the Tigers (1980–1983), LSU finished 7–4, 3–7–1, 8–3–1, and 4–7. Only one of Stovall's teams appeared in the final AP Poll: the 1982 team. That team finished the season ranked No. 11 after it beat No. 4 Florida, No. 8 Alabama, and No. 7 Florida State and earned a spot in the Orange Bowl, where LSU lost, 21–20, to a No. 3 Nebraska team led by Tom Osborne. As a result of his performance in 1982, Stovall was named the national coach of the year by the Walter Camp Football Foundation, as well as the SEC Coach of the Year.

In 1983, Stovall's success of 1982 came unraveled. The Tigers went 0–6 in the SEC, including a 45–26 loss at home to Mississippi State, leaving Stovall 0–4 for his career against the Bulldogs.

Stovall had a 2–2 record against Tulane. To date, the Tigers have only lost to Tulane on two other occasions since 1948, both under McClendon. After the Tigers had secured the Orange Bowl berth in 1982, they suffered their only home loss to Tulane since 1948. The Tigers have won 18 in a row in the series since but has only played the Green Wave six times since 1994, typically winning by comfortable margins.

Stovall's dismissal by athletic director Bob Brodhead was approved by the LSU Board of Supervisors on December 2, 1983.

== Administration ==
After his head coaching stint at LSU, Stovall went on to take a job in banking before becoming athletic director at Louisiana Tech University from 1990 to 1994. Afterwards, Stovall became the president and CEO of the Baton Rouge Area Sports Foundation, an organization dedicated to securing sporting events for the Baton Rouge area.

== Death ==
Stovall died on August 31, 2026, at the age of 85.

== Head coaching record ==
Year	Team	Overall	Conference	Standing	Bowl/playoffs	Coaches^{#}	AP^{°}
LSU Tigers (Southeastern Conference) (1980–1983)
1980	LSU	7–4	4–2	T–4th			
1981	LSU	3–7–1	1–4–1	8th			
1982	LSU	8–3–1	4–1–1	2nd	L Orange	11	11
1983	LSU	4–7	0–6	T–9th			
LSU:		22–21–2	9–13–2				
Total:		22–21–2					
^{#}Rankings from final Coaches Poll.; ^{°}Rankings from final AP Poll.
