= 1983 Orange Bowl =

- 49th Orange Bowl
- The Miami Orange Bowl in Miami, Florida, hosted the Orange Bowl.
| LSU Tigers | Nebraska Cornhuskers |
| (8–2–1) | (11–1) |
| SEC | Big Eight |
| 20 | 21 |
| Head coach: Jerry Stovall | Head coach: Tom Osborne |
| AP / Coaches; 13 / 13 | AP / Coaches; 3 / 3 |
| | 1 | 2 | 3 | 4 | Total |
|---|---|---|---|---|---|
| LSU | 7 | 7 | 3 | 3 | 20 |
| Nebraska | 7 | 0 | 7 | 7 | 21 |
- Date: January 1, 1983
- Season: 1982
- Stadium: Orange Bowl
- Location: Miami, Florida
- MVP: Turner Gill (Nebraska QB); Dave Rimington (Nebraska C)
- Favorite: Nebraska by 10½ points
- Referee: Dixon Holman (SWC)
- Attendance: 54,407

United States TV coverage
- Network: NBC
- Announcers: Don Criqui and John Brodie
- Nielsen ratings: 8.9

The 1983 Orange Bowl was the 49th edition of the college football bowl game, played at the Orange Bowl in Miami, Florida, on Saturday, January 1. Part of the 1982–83 bowl game season, it matched the thirteenth-ranked LSU Tigers of the Southeastern Conference (SEC) and the #3 Nebraska Cornhuskers of the Big Eight Conference. Favored Nebraska won by a point, 21–20.

The game suffered its lowest attendance (54,407) in 36 years, due to civil disturbances in the nearby Overtown neighborhood, as well as the game having no impact on the national championship, since second-ranked Penn State was playing #1 Georgia at the same time in the Sugar Bowl in New Orleans. In addition, Nebraska had played at Hawaii in December (and in the previous Orange Bowl), while LSU had lost two of its last three games of the regular season.

== Teams ==
=== LSU ===
LSU began the season 7–0–1, notching two huge road victories in Southeastern Conference play, ousting #5 Florida 24–13 in October and #4 Alabama in November. The 20–10 triumph at Birmingham's Legion Field was the Tigers' first over the Crimson Tide since 1970 and lifted LSU to No. 6 in the national polls.

One week after toppling Alabama, any faint national championship hopes LSU harbored were blown away with a stunning 27–24 loss to Mississippi State in Starkville. The Tigers recovered the next week to rout Florida State 55–21 in Baton Rouge to earn an Orange Bowl berth, but they inexplicably dropped a 31–28 decision to Tulane, a 28-point underdog, at home in the regular season finale. It was the Green Wave's first victory at Tiger Stadium since 1948, and is Tulane's last triumph in the series, which has not been played on a yearly basis since 1994 and not at all since 2009. Despite the November swoon, LSU came into the bowl game ranked 13th in the AP and UPI polls. LSU was making a fifth Orange Bowl appearance, the first in nine years.

=== Nebraska ===
Nebraska was 11–1 and ranked third in both polls, but they had been denied a chance to play for the national championship due to a controversial 27–24 loss at Penn State in September. The Huskers were in their ninth Orange Bowl, the second of three consecutive appearances.

== Game summary ==
Nebraska forced a three and out, and then scored easily on their first possession, capped by a five-yard touchdown run by fullback Mark Schellen to take a 7–0 lead just four minutes into the game, and the heavily favored Huskers looked as if they would put the Tigers away early. But then a series of miscues turned the game on its head.

Toby Williams intercepted a Tiger pass at the Husker seven to thwart a promising LSU drive. But the Huskers fumbled the ball right back to LSU on the very next play from scrimmage, and Dalton Hilliard scored from the one to tie the game at seven.

Nebraska drove to the LSU 15 before fumbling again, then inexplicably fumbled a third time after forcing LSU to punt. Turner Gill then threw an interception. The Tigers took advantage with a second Hilliard 1-yard touchdown run, and Nebraska found itself trailing 14–7 at halftime after committing four turnovers on four consecutive series.

Halftime provided no relief for the mistake-prone Husker offense, with a missed field goal on the opening drive of the second half, followed by yet another fumble. LSU converted the latest Husker error into a 28-yard Juan Bentanzos field goal, which gave them a 17–7 lead.

On the very next series, Nebraska held on to the football and went on a 12-play, 80-yard scoring drive, capped by an 11-yard swing pass from Turner Gill to Mike Rozier which pulled the Huskers within three at 17–14.

Gill then finished off a seven-play, 47-yard drive with a quarterback sneak early in the fourth to put the Huskers ahead 21–17. Another miscue, this time a dropped pass on a fake field goal, prevented the Huskers from extending their lead. LSU got a 49-yard field goal from Bentanzos late following an interception (Nebraska's sixth turnover of the night), but they could not get the ball back again, and the Cornhuskers held on to win 21–20.

=== Scoring ===
First quarter

- Nebraska – Mark Schellen 5-yard run (Kevin Seibel kick), 10:57
- LSU – Dalton Hilliard 1-yard run (Juan Betanzos kick), 4:24

Second quarter

- LSU – Hilliard 1-yard run (Betanzos kick), 9:32

Third quarter

- LSU – Betanzos 28-yard field goal, 6:40
- Nebraska – Mike Rozier 11-yard pass from Turner Gill (Seibel kick), 1:25

Fourth quarter

- Nebraska – Gill 1-yard run (Seibel kick), 11:14
- LSU – Betanzos 49-yard field goal, 5:05

== Statistics ==
| Statistics | LSU | Nebraska |
|---|---|---|
| First downs | 12 | 22 |
| Rushes–yards | 31–38 | 58–219 |
| Passing yards | 173 | 184 |
| Passes (C–A–I) | 14–30–2 | 13–22–2 |
| Total offense | 61–211 | 80–403 |
| Punts–average | 6–39 | 1–31 |
| Fumbles–lost | 1–0 | 4–4 |
| Turnovers | 2 | 6 |
| Penalties-yards | 8–57 | 4–25 |
| Time of possession | 25:28 | 34:32 |

== Aftermath ==
Nebraska remained in third in the final AP poll and LSU climbed to eleventh.

Nebraska played in its third consecutive Orange Bowl the following year; through 2024, LSU has yet to return.

These two teams met again in the Sugar Bowl in January 1985 and 1987, both won by Nebraska.
