= Charley Pell =

American football player and coach (1941–2001)

- Pell in 1977

Biographical details
- Born: February 17, 1941; Albertville, Alabama, U.S.
- Died: May 29, 2001 (aged 60); Gadsden, Alabama, U.S.

Playing career
- 1961–1963: Alabama
- Positions: Guard, defensive tackle

Coaching career (HC unless noted)
- 1964: Alabama (GA)
- 1965–1968: Kentucky (DL)
- 1969–1973: Jacksonville State
- 1974–1975: Virginia Tech (DC)
- 1976: Clemson (DC)
- 1977–1978: Clemson
- 1979–1984: Florida

Administrative career (AD unless noted)
- 1971–1973: Jacksonville State

Head coaching record
- Overall: 83–43–5
- Bowls: 3–3

Accomplishments and honors

Championships
- M-SAC (1970); ACC (1978); National (1961)

Awards
- 2× ACC Coach of the Year (1977, 1978)

Charles Byron Pell (February 17, 1941 – May 29, 2001) was an American college football player and coach. Pell was an Alabama native and an alumnus of the University of Alabama, where he played college football. He is most notably remembered as the head coach of the Clemson University and the University of Florida football teams. Pell was credited with laying the foundation for the later success of both programs, but his coaching career was tainted by National Collegiate Athletic Association (NCAA) rules violations.

== Early life and education ==
Pell was born in Albertville, Alabama, in 1941. Neither of his parents had completed any education beyond the fifth grade. He did not play football until his senior year of high school. After graduating from high school, he attended the University of Alabama, having been recruited to play football for the Crimson Tide by coach Bear Bryant. Pell was undersized at 187 pounds, but he became an all-Southeastern Conference guard and defensive tackle. Pell played for Bryant's Crimson Tide from 1961 to 1963, including Bryant's first national championship team in 1961.

== Coaching career ==
After graduating from the University of Alabama, Pell lived in Tuscaloosa, serving as a graduate assistant under Bear Bryant in 1964. Charlie Bradshaw, the Kentucky Wildcats football head coach, as well as a former Alabama assistant, offered Pell a position as the defensive line coach at the University of Kentucky. While coaching at Kentucky, Pell met his future wife, Ward Noel.

=== Jacksonville State ===
Pell earned his first head coaching job at age 28 when he was hired by Jacksonville State University in 1969. He coached the Gamecocks to four consecutive winning seasons, including a 10–0 record and a Gulf South Conference championship in 1970. His overall record as head coach was 33–13–1.

In 1974, Pell left NAIA Jacksonville State to become defensive coordinator for Division I Virginia Tech Hokies. He stayed for just two seasons.

=== Clemson ===
After taking the defensive coordinator position for the Clemson Tigers football team in 1976, he was elevated to head coach in 1977 when Red Parker was fired. In his first year, he led the Tigers to the 1977 Gator Bowl—their first bowl invitation in 18 years. A year later, his Tigers won their first Atlantic Coast Conference (ACC) championship in 11 years, and were ranked seventh in the final AP Poll—the highest final ranking in school history at the time. Pell was named ACC Coach of the Year in 1978, and compiled an 18–4–1 record.

Pell left Clemson after the 1978 regular season to become head coach at the University of Florida. He was succeeded at Clemson by assistant coach Danny Ford, who led the Tigers in the Gator Bowl. In 1982, it emerged that Pell and his staff had committed major NCAA infractions in player recruiting, for which the NCAA placed the Clemson football program on two years' probation. The Tigers were allowed to keep their 1978 ACC title.

=== Florida ===
Pell coached the Florida Gators football team from 1979 to 1984, posting a 33–26–3 record. The 1979 Gators suffered an 0–10–1 record—still the worst in school history. However, Pell's Gators quickly improved, with winning records and bowl invitations during the next four years. The Gators' improvement from 0–10–1 in 1979 to 8–4 in 1980 was the largest one-year turnaround in major college football history at the time. His 1983 Gators finished 9–2–1 and were ranked sixth in the final Associated Press football poll—the Gators' first-ever top-ten finish, and the highest final ranking in school history at the time.

=== NCAA investigation and resignation ===
After the 1982 season, the National Collegiate Athletic Association (NCAA) began an investigation into possible rules violations by Pell and his staff at Florida. Pell took full responsibility for the violations in August 1984 and announced he would resign at the end of the season. However, on September 16, only three games into the season, the NCAA announced that Florida was alleged to have committed 107 infractions—including spying on other teams' practices, payments and gifts to players, and allowing walk-ons to stay in the athletic dorm. That night, university president Marshall Criser fired Pell and named his offensive coordinator, Galen Hall, as interim coach. Hall and the 1984 Gators won Florida's first-ever Southeastern Conference (SEC) football championship, but the SEC refused to allow the Gators to play in the Sugar Bowl; LSU went in their place. In January 1985, after it was ultimately determined that Pell and the Gators coaching staff had actually committed 59 infractions, the NCAA placed Florida on two years' probation and banned the Gators from bowl games and live television in 1985 and 1986. The NCAA also reduced the Gators' football scholarships by 20 over three years. To the shock and dismay of the team and fans, the SEC university presidents voted to retroactively vacate the Gators' 1984 SEC championship in the spring of 1985. The loss of scholarships proved to be the most crippling sanction in the long-term; with a depleted roster, the Gators did not win more than seven games from 1986 to 1989.

During his time at the University of Florida, Pell led the fund-raising efforts to make several major facility improvements at Florida Field, including the construction of a world-class training facility (the Ben Hill Griffin, Jr. Athletic Training Center), a major expansion of the south end zone seating and the construction of the first luxury skyboxes. Pell is credited by many with rebuilding Florida's football program and rehabilitating the finances of the school's athletic department. At the same time, he was condemned for committing NCAA violations whose repercussions hobbled the program for the rest of the decade.

== Later life ==
After being fired by Florida, Pell was unable to secure another coaching job, a frustration that was a factor in a suicide attempt in 1994. Pell was treated for clinical depression and became a spokesman for depression awareness. He coached one season of high school football at the newly built Lake Region High School in Eagle Lake, Florida, but his new players were undersized and inexperienced, and the team finished 1–9. He worked as a real estate broker and auctioneer for several years before dying of lung cancer in 2001.

Pell was married to the former Ward Noel. Pell was survived by his wife, their three children, and two grandchildren.

In May 2012, Pell was inducted into the Alabama Sports Hall of Fame.

== Head coaching record ==
| Year | Team | Overall | Conference | Standing | Bowl/playoffs | Coaches^{#} | AP^{°} |
|---|---|---|---|---|---|---|---|
Jacksonville State Gamecocks (Alabama Collegiate Conference) (1969)
| 1969 | Jacksonville State | 3–6 | 0–3 | | | | |
| Jacksonville State: | | 3–6 | 0–3 | | | | |
Jacksonville State Gamecocks (Mid-South Athletic Conference / Gulf South Conference) (1970–1973)
| 1970 | Jacksonville State | 10–0 | 5–0 | 1st | W Orange Blossom Classic | | |
| 1971 | Jacksonville State | 6–3 | 3–2 | 3rd | | | |
| 1972 | Jacksonville State | 7–2–1 | 4–1–1 | 3rd | | | |
| 1973 | Jacksonville State | 7–2 | 5–2 | 2nd | | | |
| Jacksonville State: | | 33–13–1 | 17–5–1 | | | | |
Clemson Tigers (Atlantic Coast Conference) (1977–1978)
| 1977 | Clemson | 8–3–1 | 4–1–1 | 3rd | L Gator | | 19 |
| 1978 | Clemson | 10–1* | 6–0* | 1st | Invited to Gator* | 7* | 6* |
| Clemson: | | 18–4–1 | 10–1–1 | | | | |
Florida Gators (Southeastern Conference) (1979–1984)
| 1979 | Florida | 0–10–1 | 0–6 | T–9th | | | |
| 1980 | Florida | 8–4 | 4–2 | T–4th | W Tangerine | 19 | |
| 1981 | Florida | 7–5 | 3–3 | T–4th | L Peach | | |
| 1982 | Florida | 8–4 | 3–3 | T–6th | L Astro-Bluebonnet | | |
| 1983 | Florida | 9–2–1 | 4–2 | T–3rd | W Gator | 6 | 6 |
| 1984 | Florida | 1–1–1** | 0–0–1** | | | | |
| Florida: | | 33–26–3 | 14–16–1 | | | | |
| Total: | | 84–43–5 | | | | | |
National championship Conference title Conference division title or championship game berth
^{#}Rankings from final Coaches Poll.; ^{°}Rankings from final AP Poll.

*Pell left for Florida after the 1978 regular season. Assistant coach Danny Ford coached the Tigers in the Gator Bowl. Clemson credits the regular season to Pell and the Gator Bowl to Ford.
** Pell was fired three games into the 1984 season. Assistant coach Galen Hall finished the season. Florida credits the first three games of the season to Pell and the final eight to Hall.

== See also ==
- List of University of Alabama people
