= Mike White (American football coach) =

American football player and coach (1936–2025)

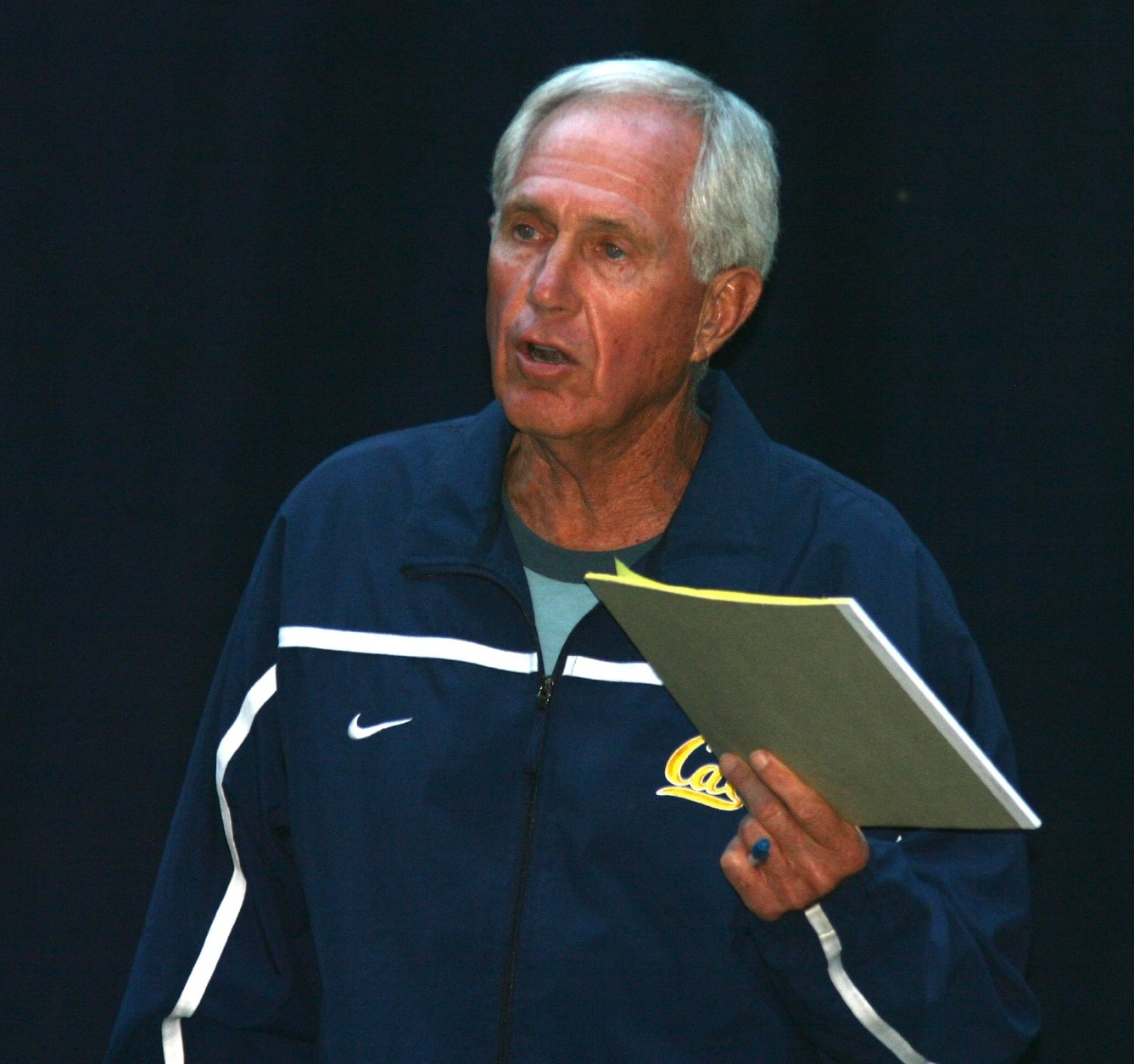
- White in 2007

Biographical details
- Born: January 4, 1936; Berkeley, California, U.S.
- Died: December 14, 2025 (aged 89); Newport Beach, California, U.S.
- Education: University of California, Berkeley

Playing career
- 1955–1957: California
- Positions: End; Wide receiver; Punter

Coaching career (HC unless noted)
- 1958–1963: California (DL)
- 1964–1971: Stanford (OC/OL)
- 1972–1977: California
- 1978–1979: San Francisco 49ers (OL)
- 1980–1987: Illinois
- 1990–1994: Los Angeles Raiders (QB/OL)
- 1995–1996: Oakland Raiders
- 1997–1999: St. Louis Rams (OA)

Head coaching record
- Overall: 82–71–4 (college); 15–17 (NFL)
- Bowls: 0–3

Accomplishments and honors

Championships
- Pac-8 (1975); Big Ten (1983); Super Bowl XXXIV champion (1999)

Awards
- The Sporting News College Football COY (1983); Walter Camp Coach of the Year (1983); Big Ten Coach of the Year (1983)

Michael Kavanaugh White (January 4, 1936 – December 14, 2025) was an American football player and coach. He had 16 years' experience as a head coach, including stints at the University of California, Berkeley (1972–1977), the University of Illinois at Urbana–Champaign (1980–1987) and the Oakland Raiders of the National Football League (NFL) (1995–1996).

== Early life ==
White was born in Berkeley, California, on January 4, 1936. He attended Acalanes High School where he was a multi-sport athlete who lettered 13 times.

White played various sports with the California Golden Bears, including rugby, track, basketball, and football. In football, White played at left end, alongside being a wide receiver and punter. He was credited as an important figure in the Bears' passing game at the time, winning three varsity letters. In track, he won both high hurdles and high jump in a 1957 meet against Stanford.

== College coaching career ==
White began his coaching career immediately following his playing career, becoming the freshman coach for the Cal Bears. He later transitioned in 1963 to the varsity team to work as end coach. He left Cal in 1964 to join head coach John Ralston at Stanford University, replacing Frank Williams and an assistant coach. The change was referred to as "not unexpected" by the Peninsula Times Tribune, and had been rumored the year prior. He served as an offensive line coach and was credited for reviving Stanford's pass protection. He also served as offensive coordinator, helping Stanford to two back-to-back Rose Bowl Game wins; a 27–17 game against the Ohio State Buckeyes, and a 13–12 win over the Michigan Wolverines.

After receiving offers from both Stanford and UC Berkeley, White became the head coach of the Cal Bears in 1972. As head coach, White was named National Coach of the Yearin 1975. He coached a team led by Joe Roth and Chuck Muncie to the Pac-8 co-championship—the school's first conference title in 18 years. White was a major contributor in the development of eventual College Football Hall of Fame quarterback Steve Bartkowski. After spending six seasons with the team, White was fired "unceremoniously" by athletic director Dave Maggard after a 7–4 season.

White returned to college football in 1980 to coach at the University of Illinois, succeeding Gary Moeller. White quickly turned around the Illinois football program, posting a winning season in only his second year. He led the Illini to the Liberty Bowl, the school's first bowl appearance since the 1964 Rose Bowl. The following season in 1983, Illinois won its first Big Ten title in 20 years with an overall record of 10–1, including a 9–0 conference record, and played in the 1984 Rose Bowl. White was honored for his team's achievements by being named National Coach of the Year. The 1983 Illinois team is the only team in Big Ten history to beat each of the other conference teams in a single season. White also led the Fighting Illini to the 1985 Peach Bowl, which they lost to Army 31–29. In eight seasons at Illinois, White's teams had a combined record of 47–41–3, for a winning percentage of .533. Along the way, White coached record-setting and future NFL wide receiver David Williams. White resigned as Illinois coach after the 1987 season due to recruiting violations.

== NFL coaching career ==
White's first stint in the National Football League came after being fired from the head coaching job at the University of California. He took the job as offensive line coach for the San Francisco 49ers in 1978 after turning down an offer to coach at Acalanes High School, his alma mater. At the time, the 49ers were commonly referred to as the worst team in the NFL with the line being called "about as effective as the Maginot Line in World War II" by John Porter of the Oakland Tribune. When head coach Bill Walsh joined the team in 1979, White was the only assistant coach he retained from its previous iteration. White aided in the transition process before serving as an administrative assistant.

On April 27, 1990, White was hired to serve as quarterbacks coach of the Los Angeles Raiders. He later coached the offensive line in 1993. White was hired to replace Art Shell as head coach of the team on February 2, 1995. In the first season for the team back in Oakland after 12 years in Los Angeles, the Raiders rocketed to an 8–2 start. But the team went into a nosedive, losing their final six games (with four of the six losses being without Jeff Hostetler at quarterback due to injury) to finish 8–8. With a "gourmet-variety offense" based on the intent to throw short, the Raiders finished with a 7–9 record in 1996. White was fired by the Raiders on Christmas Eve, being given the news by Bruce Allen though Al Davis was involved in the decision.

White was on the coaching staff of the Rams from 1997 to 1999, including a Super Bowl victory at the conclusion of the '99 season. White later served as the Director of Football Administration for the Kansas City Chiefs, beginning in 2001.

== Personal life and death ==
White was a member of Delta Upsilon fraternity, as well as a board member for the Lott IMPACT Trophy, awarded annually to college football's Defensive IMPACT Player of the Year.

White died in Newport Beach, California on December 14, 2025, at the age of 89.

== Head coaching record ==
=== College ===
Year	Team	Overall	Conference	Standing	Bowl/playoffs	Coaches^{#}	AP^{°}
California Golden Bears (Pacific-10 Conference) (1972–1977)
1972	California	3–8	3–4	5th			
1973	California	4–7	2–5	T–5th			
1974	California	7–3–1	4–2–1	T–3rd			
1975	California	8–3	6–1	T–1st		15	14
1976	California	5–6	3–4	T–4th			
1977	California	8–3	4–3	5th			
California:		35–30–1	21–19–1				
Illinois Fighting Illini (Big Ten Conference) (1980–1987)
1980	Illinois	3–7–1	3–5	T–6th			
1981	Illinois	7–4	6–3	T–3rd			
1982	Illinois	7–5	6–3	4th	L Liberty		
1983	Illinois	10–2	9–0	1st	L Rose	10	10
1984	Illinois	7–4	6–3	T–2nd			
1985	Illinois	6–5–1	5–2–1	3rd	L Peach		
1986	Illinois	4–7	3–5	T–6th			
1987	Illinois	3–7–1	2–5–1	8th			
Illinois:		47–41–3	40–26–2				
Total:		82–71–4					
National championship Conference title Conference division title or championship game berth
^{#}Rankings from final Coaches Poll.; ^{°}Rankings from final AP Poll.; Sources:

=== National Football League ===
Team	Year	Regular season					Postseason			
Team	Year	Won	Lost	Ties	Win %	Finish	Won	Lost	Win %	Result
OAK	1995	8	8	0	.500	5th in AFC West	-	-		
OAK	1996	7	9	0	.438	4th in AFC West	-	-		
Total		15	17	0	.469					
