= 1983 NCAA football bowl games =

In college football, 1983 NCAA football bowl games may refer to:

- 1982–83 NCAA football bowl games, for games played in January 1983 as part of the 1982 season.
- 1983–84 NCAA football bowl games, for games played in December 1983 as part of the 1983 season.
