= 1982 Tangerine Bowl =

American college football game

Auburn Tigers	Boston College Eagles
(8–3)	(8–2–1)
SEC	Independent
33	26
Head coach: Pat Dye	Head coach: Jack Bicknell
AP / Coaches; 18 / 15
	1	2	3	4	Total
Auburn	3	20	10	0	33
Boston College	7	3	0	16	26
- Date: December 18, 1982
- Season: 1982
- Stadium: Orlando Stadium
- Location: Orlando, Florida
- MVP: Randy Campbell, QB, Auburn
- Referee: Robin Wood (ACC)
- Attendance: 51,296

The 1982 Tangerine Bowl was held on December 18, 1982 at the Orlando Stadium in Orlando, Florida. The #18 Auburn Tigers defeated the Boston College Eagles by a score of 33–26.

== Notability ==
The 1982 Tangerine Bowl was the last to be called the Tangerine Bowl; the name was changed to the Florida Citrus Bowl for the 1983 game.

== Game summary ==
The first quarter was somewhat slow compared to the rest of the game; Boston College opened the scoring as Doug Flutie found the end zone on a 5-yard rush to put BC up 7–0. Auburn countered, though, scoring a 19-yard field goal. The first quarter ended 7–3. Auburn's offense turned it on in the second quarter, scoring on a Bo Jackson 1-yard rush and another 2-yard rush to take a 17–7 lead. BC converted a 34-yard field goal but Auburn found the end zone once again as Jackson scored from 6 yards out, though the two-point conversion failed and the second quarter ended 23–10. The third quarter saw Auburn's lead extend from 17 to 27 as they scored twice more, from a 23-yard field goal and then from a 15-yard rush. BC retaliated in the fourth, though, as Doug Flutie delivered two touchdown passes and was responsible for both successful two-point conversions. The 16-point comeback wasn't enough, as Auburn won the game, 33–26.

== Aftermath ==
Auburn's win saw them rise in the polls and finish at #14. Boston College, who entered the game unranked, remained unranked.

Auburn fullback Greg Pratt, who scored a touchdown in the game and entered the next season as the starting fullback, died in spring practice after collapsing from heat exhaustion in spring practice.
