= 1982 Peach Bowl =

- 15th Peach Bowl
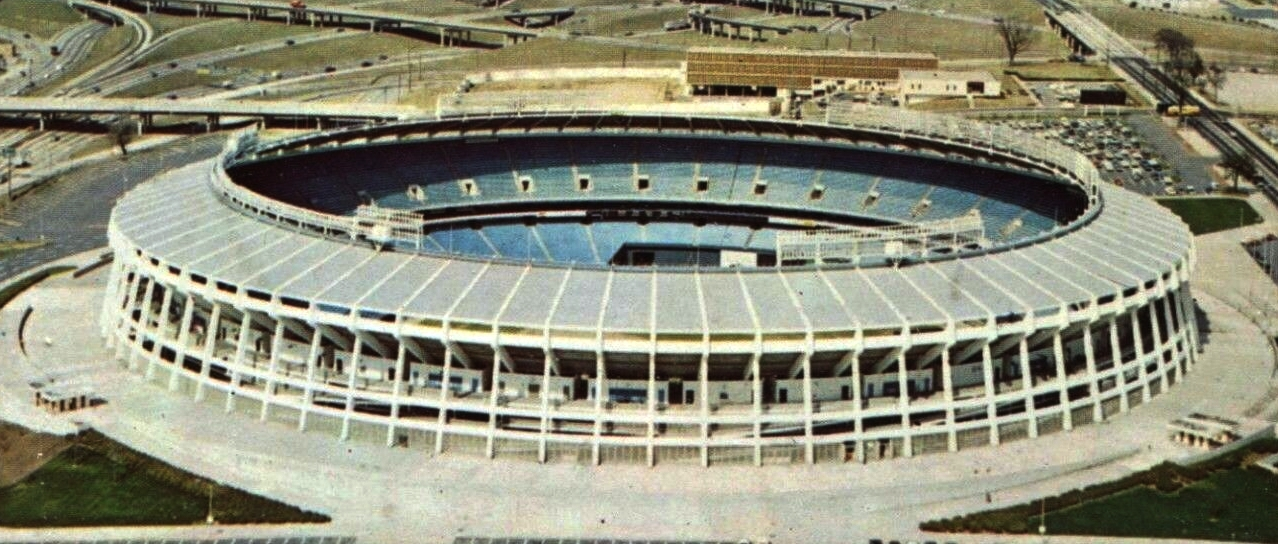
- Atlanta–Fulton County Stadium in Atlanta, Georgia, hosted the Peach Bowl.
Iowa Hawkeyes	Tennessee Volunteers
(7–4)	(6–4–1)
Big Ten	SEC
28	22
Head coach: Hayden Fry	Head coach: Johnny Majors
	1	2	3	4	Total
Iowa	0	21	7	0	28
Tennessee	7	0	12	3	22
- Date: December 31, 1982
- Season: 1982
- Stadium: Atlanta–Fulton County Stadium
- Location: Atlanta, GA
- MVP: Chuck Long (Iowa QB); Clay Uhlenhake (Iowa DL)
- Referee: Jim Garvey (ECAC)
- Attendance: 50,134

United States TV coverage
- Network: CBS Sports
- Announcers: Verne Lundquist and Steve Davis

The 1982 Peach Bowl, part of the 1982–83 bowl season, took place on December 31, 1982, at Atlanta–Fulton County Stadium in Atlanta, Georgia. The competing teams were the Iowa Hawkeyes, representing the Big Ten Conference, and the Tennessee Volunteers of the Southeastern Conference (SEC). This was the first ever meeting between the schools, and Iowa was victorious by a final score of 28–22.

== Game summary ==
Scoring summary

Quarter	Time	Drive			Team	Scoring information	Score	
Quarter	Time	Plays	Yards	TOP	Team	Scoring information	Iowa	Tennessee
1					Tennessee	Alan Cockrell 1-yard touchdown run, Fuad Reveiz kick good	0	7
2					Iowa	Dave Moritz 57-yard touchdown reception from Chuck Long, Nichol kick good	7	7
2					Iowa	Ronnie Harmon 18-yard touchdown reception from Chuck Long, Nichol kick good	14	7
2					Iowa	Ronnie Harmon 8-yard touchdown reception from Chuck Long, Nichol kick good	21	7
3					Tennessee	Coleman 10-yard touchdown run, Fuad Reveiz kick failed	21	13
3					Iowa	Phillips 2-yard touchdown run, Nichol kick good	28	13
3					Tennessee	Willie Gault 19-yard touchdown reception from Alan Cockrell, 2-point pass failed	28	19
4					Tennessee	27-yard field goal by Fuad Reveiz	28	22
"TOP" = time of possession. For other American football terms, see Glossary of American football.							28	22

=== Team statistics ===
	Iowa	Tennessee
First downs	24	23
Rushing yards	43–110	38–154
Passing	19–26–1	22–41–0
Passing yards	304	221
Total offense	414	375
Fumbles lost	1–1	2–1
Punts–average	5–35.0	5–45.0
Penalties	3–30	7–47

=== Individual leaders ===
Passing
Iowa: Long – 19–26, 304 yds, 3 TD, 1 INT
Tenn: Cockrell – 22–41, 221 yds, 1 TD

Rushing
Iowa: Gill – 16 carries, 70 yds; Phillips – 10 carries, 34 yds, 1 TD
Tenn: Coleman – 11 carries, 103 yds, 1 TD; Furnas – 12 carries, 52 yds

Receiving
Iowa: Moritz – 8 catches, 168 yds, 1 TD; Harmon – 3 catches, 44 yds, 2 TD
Tenn: Wilson – 7 catches, 62 yds; Duncan – 3 catches, 52 yds
