= 1982 Kentucky Wildcats football team =

American college football season

1982 Kentucky Wildcats football
- Conference: Southeastern Conference
- Record: 0–10–1 (0–6 SEC)
- Head coach: Jerry Claiborne (1st season)
- Offensive scheme: I-formation
- Base defense: Wide-Tackle Six
- Home stadium: Commonwealth Stadium

1982 Southeastern Conference football standings
	Conf.					Overall
Team	W		L		T	W		L		T
No. 4 Georgia $	6	–	0	–	0	11	–	1	–	0
No. 11 LSU	4	–	1	–	1	8	–	3	–	1
No. 14 Auburn	4	–	2	–	0	9	–	3	–	0
Vanderbilt	4	–	2	–	0	8	–	4	–	0
Tennessee	3	–	2	–	1	6	–	5	–	1
Alabama	3	–	3	–	0	8	–	4	–	0
Florida	3	–	3	–	0	8	–	4	–	0
Mississippi State	2	–	4	–	0	5	–	6	–	0
Ole Miss	0	–	6	–	0	4	–	7	–	0
Kentucky	0	–	6	–	0	0	–	10	–	1
$ – Conference champion; Rankings from AP Poll

The 1982 Kentucky Wildcats football team represented the University of Kentucky in the Southeastern Conference (SEC) during the 1982 NCAA Division I-A football season. In their first season under head coach Jerry Claiborne, the Wildcats compiled a 0–10–1 record (0–6 against SEC opponents), finished in last place in the SEC, and were outscored by their opponents, 287 to 96. The team played its home games in Commonwealth Stadium in Lexington, Kentucky.

The team's statistical leaders included Randy Jenkins with 933 passing yards, George Adams with 720 rushing yards, and Robert Mangas with 293 receiving yards.

Jerry Claiborne had been the head football coach at Virginia Tech from 1961 to 1970 and Maryland from 1972 to 1981. He had played college football at Kentucky under Bear Bryant from 1946 to 1949. He was hired as Kentucky's head football coach in December 1981.

== Schedule ==
Date	Opponent	Site	Result	Attendance	Source
September 11	at Kansas State*	KSU Stadium; Manhattan, KS	L 9–23	29,400	
September 18	Oklahoma*	Commonwealth Stadium; Lexington, KY	L 8–29	57,369	
September 25	Kansas*	Commonwealth Stadium; Lexington, KY	T 13–13	55,320	
October 2	at Clemson*	Memorial Stadium; Clemson, SC	L 6–24	63,115	
October 9	at Auburn	Jordan-Hare Stadium; Auburn, AL	L 3–18	53,000	
October 16	No. 16 LSU	Commonwealth Stadium; Lexington, KY	L 10–34	55,107	
October 23	No. 3 Georgia	Commonwealth Stadium; Lexington, KY	L 14–27	56,697	
October 30	at Virginia Tech*	Lane Stadium; Blacksburg, VA	L 3–29	35,700	
November 6	Vanderbilt	Commonwealth Stadium; Lexington, KY (rivalry)	L 10–23	56,123	
November 13	Florida	Commonwealth Stadium; Lexington, KY (rivalry)	L 13–39	53,245	
November 20	at Tennessee	Neyland Stadium; Knoxville, TN (rivalry)	L 7–28	93,689	
*Non-conference game; Rankings from Coaches' Poll released prior to the game
