= 1982 Ole Miss Rebels football team =

American college football season

1982 Ole Miss Rebels football
- Conference: Southeastern Conference
- Record: 4–7 (0–6 SEC)
- Head coach: Steve Sloan (5th season)
- Offensive coordinator: John Cropp (5th season)
- Defensive coordinator: Bill Canty (2nd season)
- Home stadium: Hemingway Stadium; Mississippi Veterans Memorial Stadium

1982 Southeastern Conference football standings
	Conf.					Overall
Team	W		L		T	W		L		T
No. 4 Georgia $	6	–	0	–	0	11	–	1	–	0
No. 11 LSU	4	–	1	–	1	8	–	3	–	1
No. 14 Auburn	4	–	2	–	0	9	–	3	–	0
Vanderbilt	4	–	2	–	0	8	–	4	–	0
Tennessee	3	–	2	–	1	6	–	5	–	1
Alabama	3	–	3	–	0	8	–	4	–	0
Florida	3	–	3	–	0	8	–	4	–	0
Mississippi State	2	–	4	–	0	5	–	6	–	0
Ole Miss	0	–	6	–	0	4	–	7	–	0
Kentucky	0	–	6	–	0	0	–	10	–	1
$ – Conference champion; Rankings from AP Poll

The 1982 Ole Miss Rebels football team represented the University of Mississippi (Ole Miss) as a member of the Southeastern Conference (SEC) during the 1982 NCAA Division I-A football season. Led by fifth-year head coach Steve Sloan, the Rebels compiled an overall record of 4–7, with a mark of 0–6 in conference play, and finished ninth in the SEC.

== Schedule ==
Date	Opponent	Site	Result	Attendance	Source
September 4	Memphis State*	Hemingway Stadium; Oxford, MS (rivalry)	W 27–10	39,150	
September 11	Southern Miss*	Hemingway Stadium; Oxford, MS	W 28–19	40,954	
September 18	No. 4 Alabama	Mississippi Veterans Memorial Stadium; Jackson, MS (rivalry)	L 14–42	62,385	
September 25	at No. 9 Arkansas*	War Memorial Stadium; Little Rock, AR (rivalry)	L 12–14	54,980	
October 9	at No. 5 Georgia	Sanford Stadium; Athens, GA	L 10–33	82,122	
October 16	TCU*^{†}	Vaught–Hemingway Stadium; Oxford, MS	W 27–9	40,162	
October 23	at Vanderbilt	Vanderbilt Stadium; Nashville, TN (rivalry)	L 10–19	40,162	
October 30	at No. 13 LSU	Tiger Stadium; Baton Rouge, LA (rivalry)	L 8–45	74,404	
November 6	Tulane*	Mississippi Veterans Memorial Stadium; Jackson, MS (rivalry)	W 45–14	23,314	
November 13	Tennessee	Mississippi Veterans Memorial Stadium; Jackson, MS (rivalry)	L 17–30	42,274	
November 20	vs. Mississippi State	Mississippi Veterans Memorial Stadium; Jackson, MS (Egg Bowl)	L 10–27	61,286	
*Non-conference game; ^{†}Homecoming; Rankings from AP Poll released prior to the game

== Roster ==
1982 Ole Miss Rebels football team roster
Players
Coaches
Offense

Pos.	#	Name	Class
QB		Kent Austin
		Buford McGee

Defense

Pos.	#	Name	Class

Special teams

Pos.	#	Name	Class

Head coach

- Steve Sloan

Coordinators/assistant coaches

Legend

- (C) Team captain
- (S) Suspended
- (I) Ineligible
- Injured
- Redshirt
