= 1982 Liberty Bowl =

- 24th Liberty Bowl
| Illinois Fighting Illini | Alabama Crimson Tide |
| (7–4) | (7–4) |
| Big Ten | SEC |
| 15 | 21 |
| Head coach: Mike White | Head coach: Bear Bryant |
| | 1 | 2 | 3 | 4 | Total |
|---|---|---|---|---|---|
| Illinois | 0 | 6 | 6 | 3 | 15 |
| Alabama | 7 | 0 | 7 | 7 | 21 |
- Date: December 29, 1982
- Season: 1982
- Stadium: Liberty Bowl Memorial Stadium
- Location: Memphis, Tennessee
- MVP: Alabama DB Jeremiah Castille
- Referee: Raymond Bower (CIFOA)
- Attendance: 54,123

United States TV coverage
- Network: MetroSports
- Announcers: Harry Kalas, Joe Kapp and Johnny Holliday

The 1982 Liberty Bowl was a postseason college football bowl game held on December 29, 1982, in Memphis, Tennessee, at Liberty Bowl Memorial Stadium. The 24th edition of the Liberty Bowl featured the Illinois Fighting Illini of the Big Ten Conference and the Alabama Crimson Tide of the Southeastern Conference (SEC). Alabama won the game, 21–15.

Alabama entered the game with a 7–4 record, having lost their final three regular season games. The team was led by coach Paul "Bear" Bryant, who was coaching his final game after twenty-five years with the program, announcing he would retire and hand over control of the team to Ray Perkins following the game. Bryant's retirement made the Liberty Bowl one of the most covered games of the season as many news stations and newspapers sent reporters to cover the game.

Illinois was led by head coach Mike White and quarterback Tony Eason. The team was making their first bowl appearance since 1964, having won each of their previous bowls.

== Game ==
In the first quarter, Ricky Moore began the scoring as he punched in a 4-yard touchdown run to give Alabama an early lead. Illinois scored their own touchdown in the second quarter as Joe Curtis scored on a 1-yard touchdown run, but kicker Mike Bass missed the extra point which gave Alabama a 7–6 halftime lead.

Wide receiver Jesse Bendross extended Alabama's lead when he scored on an 8-yard touchdown run off a reverse. Illinois rallied behind quarterback Tony Eason following a touchdown pass to Oliver Williams and a 23-yard field goal from Mike Bass. Craig "Touchdown" Turner scored the final points in the fourth quarter for Alabama from a 1-yard touchdown run.

Defensive back Jeremiah Castille was named the game's MVP after intercepting three passes from Tony Eason. Despite giving up 444 total offensive yards from Illinois, 423 passing yards by Eason, Alabama won the game 21–15.

The Tide intercepted seven passes in this game, four from Eason and three from backup quarterback Kris Jenner. Jenner was in the game for only three plays, all of which came after Eason had to leave the game after taking a hard hit from the Alabama defense. On all three plays, Jenner attempted a pass which was intercepted.

Bear Bryant finished with a collegiate record of 323 victories, 85 losses, and 17 ties. Bryant died of a heart attack January 26, 1983—exactly four weeks after the Liberty Bowl.

== Scoring summary ==
| Quarter | Team | Scoring summary | Score | |
| Quarter | Team | Scoring summary | Illinois | Alabama |
|---|---|---|---|---|
| 1 | Alabama | Ricky Moore 4-yard touchdown run, Peter Kim kick good | 0 | 7 |
| 2 | Illinois | Joe Curtis 1-yard touchdown run, Mike Bass kick no good | 6 | 7 |
| 3 | Alabama | Jesse Bendross 8-yard touchdown run, Peter Kim kick good | 6 | 14 |
| 3 | Illinois | Oliver Williams 2-yard touchdown reception from Tony Eason, two-point conversion no good | 12 | 14 |
| 4 | Alabama | Craig Turner 1-yard touchdown run, Peter Kim kick good | 12 | 21 |
| 4 | Illinois | Mike Bass 23-yard field goal | 15 | 21 |
| | | | 15 | 21 |

== Statistical summary ==
Team Statistics

(Rushing-Passing-Total): UI - 21-423-444; UA - 217-130-347.

Individual Statistical Leaders

Rushing (Att.-Yds.-TD): UI - Curtis 7-13-1, Richard Ryles 4-10-0; UA - Moore 13-65-1, Jeff Fagan 6-38-0, Turner 11-36-1.

Passing (Att.-Comp.-Int.-TD-Yds.): UI - Eason 55-35-4-1-423, Kris Jenner 3-0-3-0-0; UA - Walter Lewis 13-7-2-0-130.

Receiving (No.-Yds.-TD): UI - Mike Martin 8-127-0, Williams 7-84-1, Tim Brewster 6-55-0; UA - Jesse Bendross 3-51-0, Joey Jones 2-60-0.
