= 1982 Tennessee Volunteers football team =

American college football season

1982 Tennessee Volunteers football

Peach Bowl, L 22–28 vs. Iowa
- Conference: Southeastern Conference
- Record: 6–5–1 (3–2–1 SEC)
- Head coach: Johnny Majors (6th season)
- Offensive coordinator: Al Saunders (1st season)
- Defensive coordinator: Bobby Jackson (3rd season)
- Captain: Mike Cofer
- Home stadium: Neyland Stadium

1982 Southeastern Conference football standings
	Conf.					Overall
Team	W		L		T	W		L		T
No. 4 Georgia $	6	–	0	–	0	11	–	1	–	0
No. 11 LSU	4	–	1	–	1	8	–	3	–	1
No. 14 Auburn	4	–	2	–	0	9	–	3	–	0
Vanderbilt	4	–	2	–	0	8	–	4	–	0
Tennessee	3	–	2	–	1	6	–	5	–	1
Alabama	3	–	3	–	0	8	–	4	–	0
Florida	3	–	3	–	0	8	–	4	–	0
Mississippi State	2	–	4	–	0	5	–	6	–	0
Ole Miss	0	–	6	–	0	4	–	7	–	0
Kentucky	0	–	6	–	0	0	–	10	–	1
$ – Conference champion; Rankings from AP Poll

The 1982 Tennessee Volunteers football team (variously "Tennessee", "UT" or the "Vols") represented the University of Tennessee in the 1982 NCAA Division I-A football season. Playing as a member of the Southeastern Conference (SEC), the team was led by head coach Johnny Majors, in his sixth year, and played their home games at Neyland Stadium in Knoxville, Tennessee. They finished the season with a record of six wins, five losses and one tie (6–5–1 overall, 3–2–1 in the SEC) and a loss against Iowa in the Peach Bowl. The Volunteers offense scored 281 points while the defense allowed 239 points.

== Schedule ==
Date	Opponent	Site	TV	Result	Attendance	Source
September 4	Duke*	Neyland Stadium; Knoxville, TN		L 24–25	95,223	
September 11	Iowa State*	Neyland Stadium; Knoxville, TN		W 23–21	90,201	
September 25	at Auburn	Jordan–Hare Stadium; Auburn, AL		L 14–24	73,600	
October 2	Washington State*	Neyland Stadium; Knoxville, TN		W 10–3	91,744	
October 9	at No. 18 LSU	Tiger Stadium; Baton Rouge, LA		T 24–24	77,448	
October 16	No. 2 Alabama	Neyland Stadium; Knoxville, TN (Third Saturday in October)		W 35–28	95,342	
October 23	at Georgia Tech*	Grant Field; Atlanta, GA	ABC	L 21–31	43,182	
November 6	Memphis State*^{†}	Neyland Stadium; Knoxville, TN		W 29–3	94,903	
November 13	at Ole Miss	Mississippi Veterans Memorial Stadium; Jackson, MS (rivalry)		W 30–17	42,274	
November 20	Kentucky	Neyland Stadium; Knoxville, TN (rivalry)		W 28–7	93,689	
November 27	at Vanderbilt	Vanderbilt Stadium; Nashville, TN		L 21–28	41,683	
December 31	vs. Iowa*	Atlanta–Fulton County Stadium; Atlanta, GA (Peach Bowl)	CBS	L 22–28	50,134	
*Non-conference game; ^{†}Homecoming; Rankings from AP Poll released prior to the game

== Roster ==
1982 Tennessee Volunteers football team roster
Players
Coaches
Offense

Pos.	#	Name	Class
WR	2	Lenny Taylor	Jr
QB	6	Alan Cockrell	So
WR	24	Clyde Duncan	Jr
WR	26	Willie Gault	Sr

Defense

Pos.	#	Name	Class
DB	40	Bill Bates	Sr
DE	92	Reggie White	Jr
DE	93	Mike Cofer	Sr
DE	97	Tony Simmons	So

Special teams

Pos.	#	Name	Class
K	4	Fuad Reveiz	So

Head coach

- Johnny Majors

Coordinators/assistant coaches

- Al Saunders – Offensive coordinator/quarterbacks
- Doug Mathews – Running backs
- Bob Harrison – Wide receivers
- Phillip Fulmer – Offensive line
- Bobby Jackson – Defensive coordinator/linebackers
- Bill Shaw – Defensive line
- Kevin Steele – Defensive ends
- Dom Capers – Defensive backs
- David Cutcliffe – Assistant

Legend

- (C) Team captain
- (S) Suspended
- (I) Ineligible
- Injured
- Redshirt

Roster

== Game summaries ==
=== Peach Bowl ===
Iowa vs. Tennessee

Team	1	2	3	4	Total
• Hawkeyes	0	21	7	0	28
Volunteers	7	0	12	3	22

- Date: December 31
- Location: Atlanta–Fulton County Stadium, Atlanta, GA
- Game attendance: 50,134
- Game weather: 41 °F (5 °C), Cloudy and cool, Wind NW 8 mph (13 km/h)
- Referee: James Garvey
- TV announcers (CBS): Verne Lundquist and Steve Davis

Scoring summary
1	0:12	TENN	Alan Cockrell 6-yard run (Fuad Reveiz kick)	TENN 7–0
2	12:59	IOWA	Moritz 57-yard pass from Chuck Long (Nichol kick)	Tied 7–7
2	6:58	IOWA	Ronnie Harmon 18-yard pass from Long (Nichol kick)	IOWA 14–7
2	2:07	IOWA	Harmon 8-yard pass from Long (Nichol kick)	IOWA 21–7
3	11:16	TENN	Coleman 10-yard run (kick failed)	IOWA 21–13
3	8:29	IOWA	Phillips 2-yard run (Nichol kick)	IOWA 28–13
3	5:34	TENN	Willie Gault 19-yard pass from Cockrell (pass failed)	IOWA 28–19
4	10:05	TENN	Reveiz 27-yard field goal	IOWA 28–22

== Team players drafted into the NFL ==
Player	Position	Round	Pick	NFL club
Willie Gault	Wide receiver	1	18	Chicago Bears
Darryal Wilson	Wide receiver	2	47	New England Patriots
Mike Cofer	Defensive end	3	67	Detroit Lions
Mike Miller	Defensive back	4	104	Green Bay Packers
Lee Jenkins	Defensive back	11	281	New York Giants
Ken Jones	Tackle	12	315	Kansas City Chiefs
