= Ivory Curry =

American football player (1961–1989)

No. 27, 31
- Positions: Defensive back, Return specialist

Personal information
- Born: February 6, 1961; Miami, Florida, U.S.
- Died: August 23, 1989 (aged 28); Brandon, Florida, U.S.
- Listed height: 5 ft 11 in (1.80 m)
- Listed weight: 185 lb (84 kg)

Career information
- High school: Miami Central
- College: Florida (1979–1982)
- NFL draft: 1983: undrafted

Career history
- Cleveland Browns (1983)*; Ottawa Rough Riders (1983–1984); Miami Dolphins (1985)*; Tampa Bay Buccaneers (1987)
- * Offseason or practice squad member only

Career NFL statistics
- Games played: 3
- Games started: 2
- Return yards: 85
- Stats at Pro Football Reference

Ivory Curry Jr. (born February 6, 1961 – August 23, 1989) was an American professional football player who was a defensive back and return specialist for the Tampa Bay Buccaneers of the National Football League (NFL). He played college football for the Florida Gators.

== Early life ==
Curry was born on February 6, 1961, in Miami, Florida. He attended Miami Central Senior High School in Miami.

== College career ==
Curry played college football for the Florida Gators from 1979 to 1982 and was a three-year letterman from 1980 to 1982. He was used as a defensive back and punt returner for the Gators, logging 75 punt returns for 631 yards and a touchdown. Curry also had eight interceptions and 220 kick return yards.

== Professional career ==
=== Cleveland Browns ===
After not being selected in the 1983 NFL draft, Curry signed with the Cleveland Browns as an undrafted free agent. On August 30, he was waived. Curry was noted for his aggressiveness by the Browns' defensive coordinator, Marty Schottenheimer.

=== Ottawa Rough Riders ===
In September 1983, Curry signed with the Ottawa Rough Riders of the Canadian Football League (CFL). He played in two games where he returned four kickoffs for 101 yards. In 1984, Curry suffered two injures, first a fractured ankle in training camp and then a knee injury which required surgery, ending his season without playing a game. He became a free agent at the end of the season.

=== Miami Dolphins ===
On May 8, 1985, Curry was signed by the Miami Dolphins. On May 12, he was released by the team.

=== Tampa Bay Buccaneers ===
On September 23, 1987, Curry was signed by the Tampa Bay Buccaneers. He played in the three strike games and returned three punts for 32 yards and three kickoffs for 53 yards. On October 19, Curry was released.

== Personal life ==
After his playing career ended, Curry worked in child care at Tampa Bay Academy. In August 1989, Curry was hospitalized for pneumonia. After 18 days in the hospital, he had a stroke and went into a coma. On August 23, 1989, Curry died.
