= Randy Campbell =

American football quarterback

Profile
- Position: Quarterback

Personal information
- Born: c.1960
- Listed height: 5 ft 11 in (1.80 m)
- Listed weight: 175 lb (79 kg)

Career information
- High school: Morgan County
- College: Auburn

Awards and highlights
- Tangerine Bowl (1982); Tangerine Bowl MVP (1982)

Thomas Randolph Campbell is an American former football player and coach. He is best known for his two years as Auburn University's starting quarterback where he set NCAA passing records and was the leader of the 1983 SEC Championship Tigers and the MVP of the 1982 Tangerine Bowl.

== Early life ==
Randy Campbell was born in North Carolina. Campbell and his family moved to Hartselle, Alabama when Campbell was in the second grade where he attended Hartselle Elementary School. He went to Morgan County High School, now known as Hartselle High School. Campbell was the starting quarterback for several years at Morgan County High School.

== College career ==
Campbell played under Coach Pat Dye as the starting quarterback during the 1982 and 1983 seasons. Other standouts on those teams were Bob Harris, David Jordan, Al Del Greco, Tommie Agee, Lionel "Little Train" James, John "Jay" Jacobs and Ben Thomas. The 1982 season is highlighted with the victory over state rival the University of Alabama Crimson Tide and Coach Paul "Bear" Bryant after a nine-year losing streak. Campbell then led the Tigers to a victory over Boston College in the Tangerine Bowl.

Campbell was named Most Valuable Player in that game where two future Heisman Trophy winners played as well; Vincent "Bo" Jackson (Auburn University) and Doug Flutie (Boston College). As Team Captain in 1983, Campbell led the Tigers to a consecutive victory over the Crimson Tide finishing the year 11–1.

== Coaching career ==
After working with a sports marketing firm in Atlanta following his graduation, he was hired as a student assistant coach with the North Alabama Lions football team in 1988. The following season, he was promoted to a full-time assistant. In 1990, Campbell was hired as an offensive coordinator of the Lions. In 1992, he returned to Auburn University as the Tigers' offensive coordinator.

== Entrepreneurship and philanthropy ==
Campbell has served as a member on Auburn University Foundation board since 2014. The foundation board is responsible for oversight of Auburn University's endowment. He chaired the membership committee which is responsible for identifying and recruiting eminently qualified Auburn alumni to serve on the foundation board. His tenure concluded in 2022.

From 1995 to 2000 Campbell was Auburn Network (Television) color analyst for football coverage.

Campbell is a cancer survivor and gives to cancer research and various cancer related Alabama charities.
