= 1982 LSU Tigers football team =

American college football season

1982 LSU Tigers football

Orange Bowl, L 20–21 vs. Nebraska
- Conference: Southeastern Conference

Ranking
- Coaches: No. 11
- AP: No. 11
- Record: 8–3–1 (4–1–1 SEC)
- Head coach: Jerry Stovall (3rd season)
- Offensive coordinator: George Belu (4th season)
- Defensive coordinator: Pete Jenkins (1st (as coordinator); 3rd overall season)
- Home stadium: Tiger Stadium

1982 Southeastern Conference football standings
	Conf.					Overall
Team	W		L		T	W		L		T
No. 4 Georgia $	6	–	0	–	0	11	–	1	–	0
No. 11 LSU	4	–	1	–	1	8	–	3	–	1
No. 14 Auburn	4	–	2	–	0	9	–	3	–	0
Vanderbilt	4	–	2	–	0	8	–	4	–	0
Tennessee	3	–	2	–	1	6	–	5	–	1
Alabama	3	–	3	–	0	8	–	4	–	0
Florida	3	–	3	–	0	8	–	4	–	0
Mississippi State	2	–	4	–	0	5	–	6	–	0
Ole Miss	0	–	6	–	0	4	–	7	–	0
Kentucky	0	–	6	–	0	0	–	10	–	1
$ – Conference champion; Rankings from AP Poll

The 1982 LSU Tigers football team represented Louisiana State University (LSU) as a member of the Southeastern Conference (SEC) during the 1982 NCAA Division I-A football season. Led by third-year head coach Jerry Stovall, the Tigers compiled an overall record of 8–3–1, with a mark of 4–1–1 in conference play, and finished second in the SEC.

== Schedule ==
Date	Opponent	Rank	Site	TV	Result	Attendance	Source
September 18	Oregon State*		Tiger Stadium; Baton Rouge, LA		W 45–7	78,425	
September 25	Rice*		Tiger Stadium; Baton Rouge, LA		W 52–13	75,040	
October 2	at No. 4 Florida		Florida Field; Gainesville, FL (rivalry)		W 24–13	73,152	
October 9	Tennessee	No. 18	Tiger Stadium; Baton Rouge, LA		T 24–24	77,448	
October 15	at Kentucky	No. 16	Commonwealth Stadium; Lexington, KY		W 34–10	55,107	
October 23	South Carolina*^{†}	No. 14	Tiger Stadium; Baton Rouge, LA		W 14–6	78,944	
October 31	Ole Miss	No. 13	Tiger Stadium; Baton Rouge, LA (rivalry)		W 45–8	74,404	
November 6	at No. 11 Alabama	No. 8	Legion Field; Birmingham, AL (rivalry)		W 20–10	77,230	
November 13	at Mississippi State	No. 6	Scott Field; Starkville, MS (rivalry)	ABC	L 24–27	31,556	
November 20	No. 7 Florida State*	No. 12	Tiger Stadium; Baton Rouge, LA		W 55–21	76,637	
November 27	Tulane*	No. 7	Tiger Stadium; Baton Rouge, LA (Battle for the Rag)		L 28–31	76,114	
January 1, 1983	vs. No. 3 Nebraska*	No. 13	Miami Orange Bowl; Miami, FL (Orange Bowl)	NBC	L 20–21	54,407	
*Non-conference game; ^{†}Homecoming; Rankings from AP Poll released prior to the game

== Roster ==
1982 LSU Tigers football team roster
Players
Coaches
Offense

Pos.	#	Name	Class
TE	83	Mitch Andrews
RB		Terry Baxter
RB		Karl Bernard
OL		Clint Berry
QB		Timmy Byrd
OL		Tommy Campbell
TE		Earl Curtis
WR		Junius Dural
WR		Eric Ellington
WR		Herman Fontenot	So
OL		Mike Gambrell
OL		John Harrell
RB	21	Dalton Hilliard	Fr
RB	33	Garry James	Fr
RB		Gene Lang
OL		Kevin Langford
WR	41	Eric Martin	So
RB		Mike Montz
RB		Jesse Myles	Sr
QB	7	Alan Risher	Sr
TE		Malcolm Scott
OL		Lance Smith	So
OL		Mike Turner
QB	5	Jeff Wickersham	Fr

Defense

Pos.	#	Name	Class
DL		Greg Bowser
DB		James Britt
DB	4	Jeffrey Dale	So
CB	35	Eugene Daniel	Jr
DL	98	Ramsey Darbar	Sr
LB		Gregg Dubroc
DL		Bill Elko
DB		Liffort Hobley
LB		Tim Joiner
LB		Rydell Malancon
DL	70	Leonard Marshall	Sr
LB	28	Sean Moore	Sr
LB	51	Albert Richardson	Jr
LB		Lawrence Williams

Special teams

Pos.	#	Name	Class
K		Juan Betanzos
P		Clay Parker

Head coach

- Jerry Stovall

Coordinators/assistant coaches

- George Belu – Offensive coordinator/offensive line
- Mack Brown – Quarterbacks
- Darrel Moody – Running backs
- Stephen Regan – Wide receivers
- Charlie Butler – Offensive line
- Pete Jenkins – Defensive coordinator/defensive line
- Bishop Harris – Outside linebackers
- Buddy Nix – Inside linebackers
- Sam Nader – Recruiting coordinator

Legend

- (C) Team captain
- (S) Suspended
- (I) Ineligible
- Injured
- Redshirt

Roster
