= Roy Harris (American football) =

American football player (born 1961)

No. 75, 67
- Position: Defensive lineman

Personal information
- Born: March 26, 1961 (age 65); Winter Garden, Florida, U.S.
- Listed height: 6 ft 2 in (1.88 m)
- Listed weight: 264 lb (120 kg)

Career information
- High school: West Orange (Winter Garden)
- College: Florida
- NFL draft: 1984: undrafted

Career history
- Atlanta Falcons (1984–1985); Miami Dolphins (1986)*; Tampa Bay Buccaneers (1987)
- * Offseason or practice squad member only
- Stats at Pro Football Reference

Roy Elliott Harris (born March 26, 1961) is an American former professional football defensive lineman who played in the National Football League (NFL) with the Atlanta Falcons and Tampa Bay Buccaneers. He played college football for the Florida Gators.

== Early life ==
Roy Elliott Harris was born on March 26, 1961, in Winter Garden, Florida. He played high school football at West Orange High School in Winter Garden. In high school, he said he wanted to play pro football to help his sister, who had to have brain surgery due to a rare virus.

== College career ==
Harris enrolled at the University of Florida to play college football for the Gators. He did not play in enough games in 1980 to earn a letter. He had a sack towards the end of the 1980 Tangerine Bowl. Harris became the starting right defensive end in 1981 after John Whittaker suffered an injury in the season opener. Harris was a three-year letterman from 1981 to 1983.

== Professional career ==
After going undrafted in the 1984 NFL draft, Harris signed with the Atlanta Falcons on May 2. He played in 15 games for the Falcons in 1984 as a reserve defensive end, recording one sack and one fumble recovery. He appeared in the first five games of the 1985 season as a backup defensive tackle/defensive end before being released on October 9, 1985.

Harris was signed by the Miami Dolphins on August 5, 1986. He was released on August 19, 1986, after the second preseason game.

On September 23, 1987, Harris signed with the Tampa Bay Buccaneers during the 1987 NFL players strike. He played in all three strike games, starting two, at defensive end for the Buccaneers and posted one sack. He was released on October 19, 1987, after the strike ended.
