= 1982 Auburn Tigers football team =

American college football season

1982 Auburn Tigers football

Tangerine Bowl champion

Tangerine Bowl, W 33–26 vs Boston College
- Conference: Southeastern Conference

Ranking
- Coaches: No. 14
- AP: No. 14
- Record: 9–3 (4–2 SEC)
- Head coach: Pat Dye (2nd season)
- Offensive coordinator: Jack Crowe (1st season)
- Offensive scheme: Wishbone
- Defensive coordinator: Frank Orgel (2nd season)
- Home stadium: Jordan-Hare Stadium

1982 Southeastern Conference football standings
	Conf.					Overall
Team	W		L		T	W		L		T
No. 4 Georgia $	6	–	0	–	0	11	–	1	–	0
No. 11 LSU	4	–	1	–	1	8	–	3	–	1
No. 14 Auburn	4	–	2	–	0	9	–	3	–	0
Vanderbilt	4	–	2	–	0	8	–	4	–	0
Tennessee	3	–	2	–	1	6	–	5	–	1
Alabama	3	–	3	–	0	8	–	4	–	0
Florida	3	–	3	–	0	8	–	4	–	0
Mississippi State	2	–	4	–	0	5	–	6	–	0
Ole Miss	0	–	6	–	0	4	–	7	–	0
Kentucky	0	–	6	–	0	0	–	10	–	1
$ – Conference champion; Rankings from AP Poll

The 1982 Auburn Tigers football team represented Auburn University in the 1982 NCAA Division I-A football season. Coached by Pat Dye, the team finished the season with a 9–3 record. Auburn ended Alabama's nine-game winning streak in the famous "Bo Over the Top" Iron Bowl, and went on to defeat Boston College in the 1982 Tangerine Bowl.

== Schedule ==
Date	Opponent	Rank	Site	TV	Result	Attendance	Source
September 11	Wake Forest*		Jordan-Hare Stadium; Auburn, AL		W 28–10	59,350	
September 18	Southern Miss*		Jordan-Hare Stadium; Auburn, AL		W 21–19	55,000	
September 25	Tennessee		Jordan-Hare Stadium; Auburn, AL (rivalry)		W 24–14	73,600	
October 2	No. 8 Nebraska*	No. 20	Jordan-Hare Stadium; Auburn, AL		L 7–41	73,900	
October 9	Kentucky		Jordan-Hare Stadium; Auburn, AL		W 18–3	53,000	
October 16	Georgia Tech*		Jordan-Hare Stadium; Auburn, AL (rivalry)		W 24–0	57,000	
October 23	at Mississippi State		Scott Field; Starkville, MS		W 35–17	32,826	
October 30	at Florida	No. 19	Florida Field; Gainesville, FL (rivalry)		L 17–19	73,532	
November 6	Rutgers*^{†}		Jordan-Hare Stadium; Auburn, AL		W 30–7	58,000	
November 13	No. 1 Georgia		Jordan-Hare Stadium; Auburn, AL (rivalry)		L 14–19	74,900	
November 27	vs. Alabama		Legion Field; Birmingham, AL (Iron Bowl)	ABC	W 23–22	76,300	
December 18	vs. Boston College*	No. 18	Orlando Stadium; Orlando, FL (Tangerine Bowl)	ESPN	W 33–26	51,296	
*Non-conference game; ^{†}Homecoming; Rankings from AP Poll released prior to the game

== Personnel ==
1982 Auburn Tigers football team roster
Players
Coaches
Offense

Pos.	#	Name	Class
QB	14	Randy Campbell	Jr
RB	34	Bo Jackson	Fr
RB	6	Lionel James	Jr
FB		Ron O'Neal

Defense

Pos.	#	Name	Class
NT	61	Dowe Aughtman	Jr

Special teams

Pos.	#	Name	Class

Head coach

- Pat Dye

Coordinators/assistant coaches

- Bud Casey (RB)

Legend

- (C) Team captain
- (S) Suspended
- (I) Ineligible
- Injured
- Redshirt
