= 1982 Florida Gators football team =

American college football season

1982 Florida Gators football

Astro-Bluebonnet Bowl, L 24–28 vs. Arkansas
- Conference: Southeastern Conference
- Record: 8–4 (3–3 SEC)
- Head coach: Charley Pell (4th season)
- Offensive coordinator: Mike Shanahan (3rd season)
- Defensive coordinator: Joe Kines (2nd season)
- Home stadium: Florida Field

1982 Southeastern Conference football standings
	Conf.					Overall
Team	W		L		T	W		L		T
No. 4 Georgia $	6	–	0	–	0	11	–	1	–	0
No. 11 LSU	4	–	1	–	1	8	–	3	–	1
No. 14 Auburn	4	–	2	–	0	9	–	3	–	0
Vanderbilt	4	–	2	–	0	8	–	4	–	0
Tennessee	3	–	2	–	1	6	–	5	–	1
Alabama	3	–	3	–	0	8	–	4	–	0
Florida	3	–	3	–	0	8	–	4	–	0
Mississippi State	2	–	4	–	0	5	–	6	–	0
Ole Miss	0	–	6	–	0	4	–	7	–	0
Kentucky	0	–	6	–	0	0	–	10	–	1
$ – Conference champion; Rankings from AP Poll

The 1982 Florida Gators football team represented the University of Florida during the 1982 NCAA Division I-A football season. The season was the fourth for Charley Pell as the head coach of the Florida Gators football team. Pell's 1982 Florida Gators posted an 8–4 overall record and a Southeastern Conference (SEC) record of 3–3, tying for sixth place in the ten-team SEC.

The highlight of the season was a nationally televised September victory over Southern Cal in the Trojans' only visit to Florida Field. Gator linebacker Wilber Marshall had 14 tackles and 4 sacks in the 17–9 victory and was named national defensive player of the week on his way to All-American honors at the end of the season. On offense, the team was led by quarterback Wayne Peace, who set an NCAA record for completion percentage in a season (70.7%) running offensive coordinator Mike Shanahan's short passing attack.

Florida played six of their first seven games at home and rode their early season success into a No. 4 ranking in early October, which matched the highest AP poll placement in program history up to that time. However, close losses to LSU and Vanderbilt and a blow-out loss to arch rival Georgia knocked them out of the polls, and the Gators finished the season 8–4 after a loss in the 1982 Bluebonnet Bowl

== Schedule ==
Date	Opponent	Rank	Site	TV	Result	Attendance	Source
September 4	No. 15 Miami (FL)*	No. 16	Florida Field; Gainesville, FL (rivalry)	USA	W 17–14	71,864	
September 11	No. 10 USC*	No. 11	Florida Field; Gainesville, FL	ABC	W 17–9	73,238	
September 25	Mississippi State	No. 5	Florida Field; Gainesville, FL	ESPN	W 27–17	71,544	
October 2	LSU	No. 4	Florida Field; Gainesville, FL (rivalry)	USA	L 13–24	73,152	
October 9	at Vanderbilt	No. 14	Vanderbilt Stadium; Nashville, TN		L 29–31	39,726	
October 16	West Texas State*^{†}		Florida Field; Gainesville, FL		W 77–14	72,885	
October 30	No. 19 Auburn		Florida Field; Gainesville, FL (rivalry)		W 19–17	73,532	
November 6	vs. No. 3 Georgia	No. 20	Gator Bowl Stadium; Jacksonville, FL (rivalry)	CBS	L 0–44	80,749	
November 13	at Kentucky		Commonwealth Stadium; Lexington, KY (rivalry)		W 39–13	53,245	
November 20	at Tulane*		Louisiana Superdome; New Orleans, LA		W 21–14	27,795	
December 4	at No. 15 Florida State*		Doak Campbell Stadium; Tallahassee, FL (rivalry)		W 13–10	57,369	
December 31	vs. No. 14 Arkansas*		Astrodome; Houston, TX (Astro-Bluebonnet Bowl)	MTN	L 24–28	31,557	
*Non-conference game; ^{†}Homecoming; Rankings from AP Poll released prior to the game

== Personnel ==
1982 Florida Gators football team roster
Players
Coaches
Offense

Pos.	#	Name	Class
RB	27	Neal Anderson	Fr
OL		Phil Bromley
RB		Johnell Brown
OL		Lomas Brown
RB		Ronnie Diltz
WR		Dwayne Dixon
TE		Chris Faulkner
OL		Dan Fike
OL		Russell Gallon
RB		Lorenzo Hampton
RB		Joe Henderson
QB		Bob Hewko
OL		Dwayne Hinson
OL		John Hunt
WR		Spencer Jackson
RB		James Jones
WR		Broughton Lang
TE		Mike Mularkey
QB	15	Wayne Peace	Jr
TE		Tom Peddle
WR		Gary Rolle
OL		Buddy Schultheis
RB		Derald Williams
RB		John L. Williams
WR		Tyrone Young

Defense

Pos.	#	Name	Class
LB		Val Brown
DB		King l Knowles
DB		Randy Clark
DB		Ivory Curry
DB		Ricky Easmon
DB		Sonny Gilliam
DL		Roy Harris
LB		Fernando Jackson
DB		Tony Lilly
LB	88	Wilber Marshall	Jr
LB		Fred McCallister
DB		Vito McKeever
LB		Patrick Miller
DL		Tim Newton
DB, P		Roger Sibbald
DB		Bruce Vaughan
DL		John Whittaker
LB		Tom Wiegmann

Special teams

Pos.	#	Name	Class
P		Ray Criswell
K		Jim Gainey
K		Bobby Raymond

Head coach

- Charley Pell

Coordinators/assistant coaches

- Mike Shanahan (OC)
- Vince Kendrick (RB)

Legend

- (C) Team captain
- (S) Suspended
- (I) Ineligible
- Injured
- Redshirt
