= 1982 Astro-Bluebonnet Bowl =

Arkansas Razorbacks	Florida Gators
(8–2–1)	(8–3)
28	24
Head coach: Lou Holtz	Head coach: Charley Pell
AP / Coaches; 14 / 12	AP / Coaches; NR / 19
	1	2	3	4	Total
Arkansas	7	0	7	14	28
Florida	7	10	7	0	24
- Date: December 31, 1982
- Season: 1982
- Stadium: Astrodome
- Location: Houston, Texas
- MVP: Gary Anderson, RB, Arkansas; Dwayne Dixon, WR, Florida
- Attendance: 31,557

United States TV coverage
- Network: ESPN
- Announcers: Fred White and Paul Maguire

The 1982 Astro-Bluebonnet Bowl was held on December 31, 1982 at the Astrodome in Houston, Texas. The #14 Arkansas Razorbacks defeated the Florida Gators by a score of 28–24.

Arkansas opened the scoring in the first quarter after running back Gary Anderson found the end zone from 16 yards out. The PAT was good and the Razorbacks led 7–0. The Gators responded, though, scoring 17 unanswered points (a 3-yard pass, a 34-yard field goal, and a 13-yard pass) to end the first quarter 7–7 and go into halftime up 17–7. The first points of the third quarter came from Arkansas, who scored on a 1-yard run from Anderson to make it a 17–14 game. Florida responded again, this time a 17-yard pass, to retake their ten-point lead and enter the fourth quarter up 24–14. Arkansas's defense pitched a shutout in the fourth quarter, while the Razorback offense found the end zone twice. Arkansas' first fourth quarter score came on a touchdown pass to make it 24-21, and the second came on a quarterback sneak from the one yard line. The game finished 28–24 in favor of Arkansas.

Throughout the game, Arkansas recorded five more first downs, 185 more rushing yards, 73 more total yards, and one less penalty. However, Florida recorded 112 more passing yards.
