= 1982 Mississippi State Bulldogs football team =

American college football season

1982 Mississippi State Bulldogs football
- Conference: Southeastern Conference
- Record: 5–6 (2–4 SEC)
- Head coach: Emory Bellard (4th season)
- Defensive coordinator: Melvin Robertson (4th season)
- Home stadium: Scott Field; Mississippi Veterans Memorial Stadium

1982 Southeastern Conference football standings
	Conf.					Overall
Team	W		L		T	W		L		T
No. 4 Georgia $	6	–	0	–	0	11	–	1	–	0
No. 11 LSU	4	–	1	–	1	8	–	3	–	1
No. 14 Auburn	4	–	2	–	0	9	–	3	–	0
Vanderbilt	4	–	2	–	0	8	–	4	–	0
Tennessee	3	–	2	–	1	6	–	5	–	1
Alabama	3	–	3	–	0	8	–	4	–	0
Florida	3	–	3	–	0	8	–	4	–	0
Mississippi State	2	–	4	–	0	5	–	6	–	0
Ole Miss	0	–	6	–	0	4	–	7	–	0
Kentucky	0	–	6	–	0	0	–	10	–	1
$ – Conference champion; Rankings from AP Poll

The 1982 Mississippi State Bulldogs football team represented Mississippi State University as a member of the Southeastern Conference (SEC) during the 1982 NCAA Division I-A football season. Led by fourth-year head coach Emory Bellard, the Bulldogs compiled an overall record of 5–6, with a mark of 2–4 in conference play, and finished eighth in the SEC.

== Schedule ==
Date	Time	Opponent	Site	TV	Result	Attendance	Source
September 4		at Tulane*	Louisiana Superdome; New Orleans, LA		W 30–21	53,641	
September 11		Arkansas State*	Scott Field; Starkville, MS		W 31–10	30,215	
September 18		at Memphis State*	Liberty Bowl Memorial Stadium; Memphis, TN		W 41–17	32,420	
September 25		at No. 5 Florida	Florida Field; Gainesville, FL		L 17–27	71,544	
October 2		No. 6 Georgia	Scott Field; Starkville, MS	CBS	L 22–29	33,158	
October 9		vs. Southern Miss*	Mississippi Veterans Memorial Stadium; Jackson, MS		L 14–20	54,236	
October 16	3:00 p.m.	at No. 17 Miami (FL)*	Miami Orange Bowl; Miami, FL		L 14–31	28,717	
October 23		Auburn	Scott Field; Starkville, MS		L 17–35	32,826	
October 30		No. 9 Alabama	Mississippi Veterans Memorial Stadium; Jackson, MS (rivalry)		L 12–20	62,110	
November 13		No. 6 LSU	Scott Field; Starkville, MS (rivalry)	ABC	W 27–24	31,556	
November 20		vs. Ole Miss	Mississippi Veterans Memorial Stadium; Jackson, MS (Egg Bowl)		W 27–10	61,286	
*Non-conference game; Rankings from AP Poll released prior to the game; All times are in Central time
