= 1982 Vanderbilt Commodores football team =

American college football season

1982 Vanderbilt Commodores football

Hall of Fame Classic, L 28–36 vs. Air Force
- Conference: Southeastern Conference
- Record: 8–4 (4–2 SEC)
- Head coach: George MacIntyre (4th season)
- Offensive coordinator: Watson Brown (2nd season)
- Defensive coordinator: Bob Brush (1st season)
- Home stadium: Vanderbilt Stadium

1982 Southeastern Conference football standings
	Conf.					Overall
Team	W		L		T	W		L		T
No. 4 Georgia $	6	–	0	–	0	11	–	1	–	0
No. 11 LSU	4	–	1	–	1	8	–	3	–	1
No. 14 Auburn	4	–	2	–	0	9	–	3	–	0
Vanderbilt	4	–	2	–	0	8	–	4	–	0
Tennessee	3	–	2	–	1	6	–	5	–	1
Alabama	3	–	3	–	0	8	–	4	–	0
Florida	3	–	3	–	0	8	–	4	–	0
Mississippi State	2	–	4	–	0	5	–	6	–	0
Ole Miss	0	–	6	–	0	4	–	7	–	0
Kentucky	0	–	6	–	0	0	–	10	–	1
$ – Conference champion; Rankings from AP Poll

The 1982 Vanderbilt Commodores football team represented Vanderbilt University in the Southeastern Conference (SEC) during the 1982 NCAA Division I-A football season. Led by head coach George MacIntyre, Vanderbilt made its first bowl appearance in eight years.

The Commodores were 8–3 in the regular season (4–2 in SEC, third), the program's first winning season since 1975 and their last until 2008.

Vanderbilt was coming off of a sixth consecutive losing season, compiling an overall record of 13–53 (.197) with only one win against 35 losses in conference play over that period. From 1976 to 1981, Vanderbilt lost 33 consecutive SEC games before defeating Ole Miss in 1981.

In 1982, Vanderbilt was a veteran team with 19 seniors and 26 juniors, led by Whit Taylor at QB and All-American's TE Allama Matthews (1982), punter Jim Arnold (1982), Corner Back Leonard Coleman (1983), flanker/TE Chuck Scott (1983), and kicker Ricky Anderson (1984).

== Schedule ==
Date	Opponent	Site	Result	Attendance	Source
September 11	at Memphis State*	Liberty Bowl Memorial Stadium; Memphis, TN	W 24–14	25,704	
September 18	at No. 11 North Carolina*	Kenan Memorial Stadium; Chapel Hill, NC	L 10–34	51,696	
September 25	at No. 4 Alabama	Bryant–Denny Stadium; Tuscaloosa, AL	L 21–24	60,210	
October 2	Tulane*	Vanderbilt Stadium; Nashville, TN	W 24–21	40,000	
October 9	No. 14 Florida	Vanderbilt Stadium; Nashville, TN	W 31–29	39,726	
October 16	at No. 4 Georgia	Sanford Stadium; Athens, GA (rivalry)	L 13–27	82,122	
October 23	Ole Miss	Vanderbilt Stadium; Nashville, TN (rivalry)	W 19–10	40,162	
November 6	at Kentucky	Commonwealth Stadium; Lexington, KY (rivalry)	W 23–10	56,123	
November 13	Virginia Tech*^{†}	Vanderbilt Stadium; Nashville, TN	W 45–0	40,356	
November 20	Chattanooga*	Vanderbilt Stadium; Nashville, TN	W 27–16	38,126	
November 27	Tennessee	Vanderbilt Stadium; Nashville, TN (rivalry)	W 28–21	41,683	
December 31	vs. Air Force	Legion Field; Birmingham, AL (Hall of Fame Classic)	L 28–36	75,114	
*Non-conference game; ^{†}Homecoming; Rankings from AP Poll released prior to the game

== Game summaries ==
=== Memphis ===
Vanderbilt started the game slow but scored 17 points in the second quarter and ending the game with 24 unanswered points before Memphis scored their final points. Whit Taylor key receiver was TE Allama Matthews for three touchdowns. Fullback Ernie Goolsby ran 21 times for 134 yards (This would be the only time in the 1982 season a Commodore player ran for over 100 yards.) Vandy only totaled 178 yards for the game. However, it was enough to win the game. Cornerback Leonard Coleman picked two interceptions, including a pick in the end zone in the third quarter to save a touchdown.

	1	2	3	4	Total
Vanderbilt	0	17	7	0	24
Memphis	7	0	0	7	14

- MS-Hooper 1 run (Ingles kick)
- VU-Matthews 9 pass from Taylor (Anderson kick)
- VU-Matthews 15 pass from Taylor (Anderson kick)
- VU-Anderson 37 field goal
- VU-Matthews 5 pass from Taylor (Anderson kick)
- MS-Becton 3 run (Ingles kick)

=== #11 North Carolina ===
Vanderbilt came into Chapel Hill facing the #11 ranked North Carolina Tar Heels. Vanderbilt took a 10–3 lead into the second quarter before the Tar Heels tied it back up before half time. The Tar Heels defense was too much for Vandy and did not allow any more points from Vanderbilt. The Tar Heels scored 24 second-half points to Vandy’s 0.

	1	2	3	4	Total
Vanderbilt	10	0	0	0	10
North Carolina	3	7	17	7	34

- NC-Barwick 25 field goal.
- VU-Anderson 37 field goal.
- VU-Jordan 11 pass from Taylor (Anderson kick).
- NC-Horton 1 run (Barwick kick).
- NC-Harrison 48 pass from Elkins (Barwick kick).
- NC-Barwick 32 field goal.
- NC-Anthony 3 run (Barwick kick).
- NC-Horton 5 pass from Elkins (Barwick kick).

=== #4 Alabama ===
For the second game in as many weeks, Vandy played a ranked team in #4 Alabama. Vanderbilt scored first with a two-yard run from Whit Taylor. But Alabama would go on to score 24 unanswered points. But the Kurt Page to Allama Matthews combination would make it a close game, scoring 14 points in the third quarter. Vandy had one last gasp in the game, driving close to field goal range, but an intentional grounding penalty put Vandy out of range to score.

	1	2	3	4	Total
Vanderbilt	7	0	14	0	21
Alabama	14	10	0	0	24

- VU-Taylor 2 run (Anderson kick).
- UA-Turner 1 run (Kim kick).
- UA-Lewis 4 run (Kim kick).
- UA-Kim 37 field goal.
- UA-Tuner 3 run (Kim kick).
- VU-Matthews 16 pass from Page (Anderson kick).
- VU-Matthews 11 pass from Page (Anderson kicked).

=== Tulane ===
Tulane turned the ball over three times to Vanderbilt. Vandy scored 17 points in the first half, holding off the Green Wave late charge to win the 1982 home opener, 24-21. The Green Wave outgained the Commodores by over 100 yards. However, the Vandy defense was able to make turnovers to stall the Green Wave from scoring. The Green Wave almost pulled off the win, but Vandy stopped the last-second effort to win the game.

	1	2	3	4	Total
Tulane	7	3	3	8	21
Vanderbilt	7	10	0	7	24

- TUL-Robinson 2 run (Woods kick)
- VU-Matthews 9 pass from Taylor (Anderson kick)
- VU-Anderson 47 field goal
- TUL-Woods 53 field goal
- VU-Matthews 9 pass from Taylor (Anderson kick)
- TUL-Veals 2 run (Smith pass from McKay)

=== #14 Florida ===
The third time was the charm for the 1982 Vanderbilt team as they faced the third ranked team of the season in number 14-ranked Florida Gators. Watson Brown Vandy’s offensive coordinator changed the offense scheme to a one back, installing Jim Popp as a second tight end to try to derail the Florida All-American Wilber Marshall. Whit Taylor was 30 of 47 passing for 287 yards and three touchdowns, running for 64 yards.

	1	2	3	4	Total
Florida	0	14	7	8	29
Vanderbilt	7	14	3	7	31

- VU-Edwards 1 run (Anderson kick)
- UF-Young 1 run (Gainey kick)
- UF-Williams 44 run (Gainey kick).
- VU-Matthews 14 pass from Taylor (Anderson kick)
- VU-Jordan 8 pass from Taylor (Anderson kick)
- VU-Anderson 30 field goal
- VU-Monaco recovers fumble in end zone (Anderson kick)
- UF-Dixon 11 pass from Peace (Mularkey pass from Peace)

=== #4 Georgia ===
The game “between the hedges” would be the last game for the Commodores to lose for the regular season. Vandy had a 13–10 lead going into the fourth quarter. Terry Hoage picked off Vanderbilt QB Whit Taylor three times in the first half. The Commodores forced Georgia to turn over the ball deep in Georgia territory. Georgia held Vandy to two Ricky Anderson field goals. Georgia scored 17 points in the fourth quarter to secure a Georgia win.

	1	2	3	4	Total
Vanderbilt	6	0	7	0	13
Georgia	0	10	0	17	27

- VU-Anderson 29 field goal
- VU-Anderson 28 field goal
- UG-Lastinger 1 run (Butler kick)
- UG-Butler 28 field goal
- VU-Edwards 1 run (Anderson kick)
- UG-Butler 35 field goal
- UG-Young 7 run (Butler kick)
- UG-Walker 26 run (Butler kick)

=== Ole Miss ===
The sixth game of the year Vanderbilt was sporting a .500 record at 3 and 3. Scouts from four bowls were at the game. Ricky Anderson put Vandy ahead with two field goals, one from 49 yards. With Vandy ahead by two points (12–10), Vandy senior linebacker Joe Staley picked off a pass and returned it for forty yards to the Rebel eight. Vandy went on to score from the eight to seal the victory for Vanderbilt and start a five-game regular season winning streak.

	1	2	3	4	Total
Ole Miss	0	7	3	0	10
Vanderbilt	6	0	0	13	19

- VU-Anderson 31 field goal
- VU-Anderson 49 field goal
- UM-Humphrey 2 run (Gatlin kick)
- UM-Gatlin 43 field goal
- VU-Jordan 11 pass from Taylor (bad snap, conversion failed)
- VU-Perry 8 pass from Taylor (Anderson)

=== Kentucky ===
Vandy spoiled Kentucky’s homecoming game in front of 56,123 Wildcat fans. A fourth-quarter interception by Vandy free safety Manuel Young stopped a drive that would have given the Wildcats the lead. Fullback Keith Edwards then made a one-hand catch from Whit Taylor for a 31-yard touchdown pass that clinched the game for the Commodores.

	1	2	3	4	Total
Vanderbilt	10	3	0	10	23
Kentucky	0	3	7	0	10

- VU-Anderson 37 field goal.
- VU-Matthews 10 pass from Taylor (Anderson kick).
- UK-Caudell 41 field goal.
- VU-Anderson 43 field goal.
- UK-Phillips 11 pass from Jenkins (Caudell kick).
- VU-Edwards 31 pass from Taylor (Anderson kick).
- VU-Anderson 44 field goal.

=== Virginia Tech ===
Vandy and Virginia Tech both came into the game at five and three and looking to get a bowl bid. Neither team scored in the first quarter. The second quarter the Commodores woke up and scored 24 points in the second quarter and held the shutout, beating them 45–0. All-American Allama Matthews set a school record by catching four touchdown passes.

	1	2	3	4	Total
Virginia Tech	0	0	0	0	0
Vanderbilt	0	24	14	7	45

- VU-Matthews 12 pass from Taylor (Anderson kick).
- VU-Anderson 49 field goal.
- VU-Matthews 3 pass from Taylor (Anderson kick).
- VU-Scott 7 pass from Taylor (Anderson kick)
- VU-Matthews 7 pass from Patton (Anderson kick).
- VU-Matthews 30 pass from Taylor (Anderson kick).
- VU-Perry 65 pass from Page (Anderson kick).

=== Chattanooga ===
Vanderbilt was looking for a sixth win and bowl eligible for the first time since 1974 and the first winning season since 1975. Vanderbilt was expected to run away with the game. However, the Moccasins had other plans. Vanderbilt and UTC were tied at ten going into the fourth quarter. Vandy took advantage of two fumbles by UTC recovered by defensive end Glenn Watson. Vandy kicked an onside kick. Vandy scored 17 points in a 2-minute, 34-second span. UTC plan to stop Vandy’s offence was to rush only two players, and the other nine to drop back or stop the run plays. Ricky Anderson's thirteenth and fourteenth field goals broke the Commodores single-season record held by Mark Adams in 1975.

	1	2	3	4	Total
Chattanooga	0	10	0	6	16
Vanderbilt	0	3	7	17	27

- UTC-Telchmann 28 field goal.
- UTC-Gillesple 76 pass from Potter (Teichmann kick).
- VU-Anderson 44 field goal.
- VU-Matthews 12 pass from Taylor (Anderson kick).
- VU-Anderson 26 field goal.
- VU-Edwards 11 run (Anderson kick).
- VU-Roach 24 pass from Taylor (Anderson kick).
- UTC-Abbott 1 run (run failed).

=== Tennessee ===
The game was billed as the “Super Bowl of Tennessee” between Vanderbilt and Tennessee. Tickets were reportedly selling for $150.00 each. The game was a sellout; 41,683 fans and 3,800 watched on closed circuit TV. Both teams swapped the lead back and forth; neither team led by more than seven points.

The whole time the game was played it rained, drenching the field. The whole season Taylor took advantage of the short pass. Vanderbilt was able to throw the bomb that won the game. Taylor passed for two 42-yard passes for a touchdown. Whit Taylor made a 65-yard pass to Phil Roach to set up the game-winning one-yard run from Whit Taylor. The run was a quarterback keeper around the right end following a fake to Keith Edwards.

	1	2	3	4	Total
Tennessee	7	7	0	7	21
Vanderbilt	7	7	7	7	28

- UT-Coleman 3 run (Revelz kick).
- VU-Perry 42 pass from Taylor (Anderson kick).
- UT-Jones 1 run (Revelz kick).
- VU-Scott 6 pas from Taylor (Anderson kick).
- UT-Jones 42 run (Revelz kick).
- VU-Taylor 1 run (Anderson kick).

=== Air Force ===
in the Hall of Fame Classic in Birmingham on December 31, Vanderbilt and Air Force played a tight game for three quarters. Going into the fourth, Vandy was up 28 to 17, but Air Force pulled away with 19 unanswered points for the 36–28 win.

Vanderbilt QB Whit Taylor was named MVP of the game. Norman Jordan caught 20 passes for 173 yards and three touchdowns.

	1	2	3	4	Total
Vanderbilt	7	14	7	0	28
Air Force	7	7	3	19	36

- VU-Jordan 28 pass from Taylor (Anderson kick).
- AF-Louthan 1 run (Pavlich kick).
- AF-Brown 19 run (Pavlich kick).
- VU-Roach 15 pass from Taylor (Anderson kick)
- VU-Jordan 4 pass from Taylor (Anderson kick).
- AF-Pavlich 21 field goal.
- VU-Jordan 4 pass from Taylor (Anderson kick).
- AF-Sundquist 3 run (pass failed).
- AF-Kershner 3 run (pass failed).
- AF-Louthan 46 run (Pavlich kick).

== Team players drafted into the NFL ==
Player	Position	Round	Pick	NFL club
Allama Matthews	Tight end	12	322	Atlanta
Jim Arnold	Punter	5	119	Kansas City

== Roster ==
1982 Vanderbilt Commodores football team roster
Players			Coaches
Offense: Pos. / # / Name / Class; QB / / Whit Taylor / Sr	Defense: Pos. / # / Name / Class; DE / / John Windham / Fr	Special teams: Pos. / # / Name / Class	Head coach: George MacIntyre; Coordinators/assistant coaches Legend: (C) Team captain; (S) Suspended; (I) Ineligible; Injured; Redshirt
