= 1982 Georgia Bulldogs football team =

American college football season

1982 Georgia Bulldogs football

SEC champion

Sugar Bowl, L 23–27 vs. Penn State
- Conference: Southeastern Conference

Ranking
- Coaches: No. 4
- AP: No. 4
- Record: 11–1 (6–0 SEC)
- Head coach: Vince Dooley (19th season)
- Offensive coordinator: George Haffner (3rd season)
- Defensive coordinator: Bill Lewis (2nd season)
- Home stadium: Sanford Stadium

1982 Southeastern Conference football standings
	Conf.					Overall
Team	W		L		T	W		L		T
No. 4 Georgia $	6	–	0	–	0	11	–	1	–	0
No. 11 LSU	4	–	1	–	1	8	–	3	–	1
No. 14 Auburn	4	–	2	–	0	9	–	3	–	0
Vanderbilt	4	–	2	–	0	8	–	4	–	0
Tennessee	3	–	2	–	1	6	–	5	–	1
Alabama	3	–	3	–	0	8	–	4	–	0
Florida	3	–	3	–	0	8	–	4	–	0
Mississippi State	2	–	4	–	0	5	–	6	–	0
Ole Miss	0	–	6	–	0	4	–	7	–	0
Kentucky	0	–	6	–	0	0	–	10	–	1
$ – Conference champion; Rankings from AP Poll

The 1982 Georgia Bulldogs football team represented the University of Georgia during the 1982 NCAA Division I-A football season. The offense scored 338 points while the defense allowed 160 points. Led by head coach Vince Dooley, the top ranked Bulldogs finished the regular season undefeated, but lost to number two Penn State 27–23 in the Sugar Bowl.

== Schedule ==
Date	Opponent	Rank	Site	TV	Result	Attendance	Source
September 6	No. 11 Clemson*	No. 7	Sanford Stadium; Athens, GA (rivalry)	ABC	W 13–7	82,122	
September 11	BYU*	No. 6	Sanford Stadium; Athens, GA		W 17–14	80,207	
September 25	at South Carolina*	No. 7	Williams–Brice Stadium; Columbia, SC (rivalry)		W 34–18	74,200	
October 2	at Mississippi State	No. 6	Scott Field; Starkville, MS	CBS	W 29–22	33,158	
October 9	Ole Miss	No. 5	Sanford Stadium; Athens, GA		W 33–10	82,122	
October 16	Vanderbilt	No. 4	Sanford Stadium; Athens, GA (rivalry)		W 27–13	82,122	
October 23	at Kentucky	No. 3	Commonwealth Stadium; Lexington, KY		W 27–14	56,697	
October 30	Memphis State*	No. 3	Sanford Stadium; Athens, GA		W 34–3	81,386	
November 6	vs. No. 20 Florida	No. 3	Gator Bowl Stadium; Jacksonville, FL (rivalry)	CBS	W 44–0	80,749	
November 13	at Auburn	No. 1	Jordan-Hare Stadium; Auburn, AL (Deep South's Oldest Rivalry)		W 19–14	74,900	
November 27	Georgia Tech*	No. 1	Sanford Stadium; Athens, GA (Clean, Old-Fashioned Hate)		W 38–18	82,122	
January 1, 1983	vs. No. 2 Penn State*	No. 1	Louisiana Superdome; New Orleans, LA (Sugar Bowl)	ABC	L 23–27	78,124	
*Non-conference game; Rankings from AP Poll released prior to the game

== Before the season ==
With the season opener against defending national champion Clemson looming, the University of Georgia received bad news when Herschel Walker suffered a fractured right thumb in practice on August 21, 1982. He was expected to be out of action for 3–6 weeks.

== Game summaries ==
=== Clemson ===
When the two teams met on September 6, Herschel Walker wore a bulky, padded cast on his right thumb. In this tight game, Walker was used primarily as a decoy as he rushed 11 times for 20 yards. The Georgia defense made up for its injured star by shutting down Clemson, limiting the Tigers to 249 total yards of offense as the Bulldogs prevailed, 13–7.

=== BYU ===
Georgia next faced a tough test in Brigham Young at home on September 9. BYU's Tom Holmoe returned an interception 83 yards for a touchdown which tied the score at 7–7 at the half. BYU threw 5 interceptions and had two missed field goals in the first half. BYU's Steve Young connected with Scott Collie on a 21-yard touchdown pass in the 3rd quarter to give Brigham Young a 14–7 lead going into the final period. However, Walker rallied the Bulldogs as he led them on two scoring drives that gave Georgia the win, 17–14. He scored on a 1-yard touchdown run late to tie the game. Later still, Walker converted on a huge fourth-and-1 that enabled Georgia kicker Kevin Butler to make a 44-yard field goal in the game's closing seconds. Walker's game-winning drive of 40 yards to set up Butler's kick covered three minutes in all, and was keyed by his 23-yard breakaway run. Walker, coming back from the thumb injury, rushed 31 times for 124 yards against the Cougars.

=== South Carolina ===
After the tough win against BYU, the Bulldogs won out to finish the regular season. After getting past South Carolina 34–18 on September 25, Georgia rolled during the month of October. Walker's performance against the Gamecocks was modest by his standards (32 rushes, 143 yards, and 1 touchdown), but he ran hard while still wearing his cast.

=== Mississippi State ===
In October, Georgia faced Mississippi State, Ole Miss, Vanderbilt, Kentucky, and Memphis State. The Bulldogs slipped past Mississippi St., 29–22, as Walker rushed 39 times for 215 yards and a touchdown.

=== Ole Miss ===
Next, Georgia overwhelmed Ole Miss, 33–10, as Walker rushed 24 times for 149 yards and 3 touchdowns.

=== Vanderbilt ===
On October 16, Georgia got past an up-and-coming Vanderbilt team (Vandy finished 8–4 in 1982) led by quarterback Whit Taylor, 27–13. Against the Commodores, Walker ran for 172 yards and a touchdown on 38 carries. He got help from safety Terry Hoage, who had 3 interceptions in the contest.

=== Florida ===
Georgia finished October by knocking off Kentucky (27–14) and Memphis State (34–3) to push its record to 8–0 going into the Florida game in Jacksonville. Walker maintained a heavy load, rushing 34 times against Kentucky for 152 yards. The Wildcats led 10–3 in the second quarter when Walker caught a John Lastinger touchdown pass. On a screen pass, Walker raced 64 yards to paydirt to cut the deficit to 14–10. Lastinger threw two more touchdowns in the second half as Georgia pulled away. Walker finished with 79 receiving yards on 3 catches. In Georgia's matchup with Memphis St., Walker shattered the Southeastern Conference career scoring record as his third-ranked Bulldogs swept past the Tigers by 31 points. He ran for a season-high 219 yards on 33 carries and 2 touchdowns, extending Memphis St.'s losing streak to 15 games.

Georgia took control against tough opposition during the month of November. They got past Florida, Auburn, and Georgia Tech to complete a perfect 11–0 regular season, and were the No. 1 ranked team in the country. Walker dismantled Florida by scoring on touchdown runs of 30, 1, and 1 yards as Georgia led 17–0 at the half. After another Walker touchdown in the third quarter, UGA led 27–0. He rushed 35 times for 219 yards during this signature win. "We were ready for this game," Walker said. "We were more fired up than Florida."

=== Auburn ===
Georgia faced the Auburn Tigers on November 13 at Jordan–Hare Stadium in a slugfest. Walker scored on a 3-yard touchdown run within the 4th quarter to give UGA a 19–14 lead. Georgia hung on to win and Walker finished with 31 rushes for 177 yards, including a 47-yard run, and 2 touchdowns.

=== Georgia Tech ===
Team	1	2	3	4	Total
Georgia Tech	0	6	0	12	18
• Georgia	7	0	17	14	38

- Date: November 27
- Location: Sanford Stadium

Scoring summary
Q1		UGA	Walker 59 yard run (Butler kick)	UGA 7–0
Q2		GT	Rice 47 yard field goal	UGA 7–3
Q2		GT	Rice 30 yard field goal	UGA 7–6
Q3		UGA	Butler 39 yard field goal	UGA 10–6
Q3	4:04	UGA	Archie 63 yard pass from Lastinger (Butler kick)	UGA 17–6
Q3	1:52	UGA	Walker 1 yard run (Butler kick)	UGA 24–6
Q4		UGA	Jackson 36 yard run (Butler kick)	UGA 31–6
Q4		GT	Lavette 6 yard run (pass failed)	UGA 31–12
Q4		GT	Lavette 1 yard run (run failed)	UGA 31–18
Q4		UGA	Jackson 14 yard run (Butler kick)	UGA 38–18

In the last regular season game of Walker's career at the University of Georgia, the Yellow Jackets were no match as Georgia raced to a 38–18 win. Walker broke five tackles and sprinted 59 yards for a score in the first quarter. The Bulldogs scored 17 points in the 3rd quarter which included a 1-yard touchdown run by Walker. He finished with 27 rushes for 162 yards against the Rambling Wreck.

=== Penn State ===
The Sugar Bowl pitted the No. 1 ranked Georgia Bulldogs against the No. 2 ranked Penn State Nittany Lions on January 1, 1983.

Walker scored one last time in his UGA career as he fell into the end zone from 1 yard out with 10:37 remaining in the third quarter. That touchdown cut the Penn State lead to three at 20–17. Penn State answered 21 seconds later as QB Todd Blackledge completed a 46-yard touchdown pass to wideout Gregg Garrity. Penn State held on to win 27–23, and won the national championship by a unanimous vote in both the AP and UPI polls. Walker rushed 28 times for 102 yards and caught a pass for 15 yards against the Mark Robinson-led PSU defense.

== Roster ==
1982 Georgia Bulldogs football team roster
Players
Coaches
Offense

Pos.	#	Name	Class
TE	88	Norris Brown	Sr
QB		John Lastinger
RB		Herschel Walker	Jr

Defense

Pos.	#	Name	Class

Special teams

Pos.	#	Name	Class
K		Kevin Butler	So

Head coach

- Vince Dooley

Coordinators/assistant coaches

Legend

- (C) Team captain
- (S) Suspended
- (I) Ineligible
- Injured
- Redshirt

== Awards and honors ==
On December 4, Walker was awarded the Heisman Trophy. He was accompanied to the ceremony by the University of Georgia's beloved English Bulldog mascot, Uga IV. Walker also won the Walter Camp Award and the Maxwell Award.

== Team players drafted into the NFL ==
Player	Position	Round	Pick	NFL club
Jimmy Payne	Defensive End	4	112	Buffalo Bills
Norris Brown	Tight End	8	213	Minnesota Vikings
