= 1982 Alabama Crimson Tide football team =

American college football season

1982 Alabama Crimson Tide football

Liberty Bowl champion

Liberty Bowl, W 21–15 vs. Illinois
- Conference: Southeastern Conference

Ranking
- Coaches: No. 17
- Record: 8–4 (3–3 SEC)
- Head coach: Bear Bryant (25th season)
- Offensive coordinator: Mal Moore (8th season)
- Offensive scheme: Wishbone
- Defensive coordinator: Ken Donahue (9th season)
- Base defense: 5–2
- Captains: Eddie Lowe; Steve Mott
- Home stadium: Bryant–Denny Stadium; Legion Field

1982 Southeastern Conference football standings
	Conf.					Overall
Team	W		L		T	W		L		T
No. 4 Georgia $	6	–	0	–	0	11	–	1	–	0
No. 11 LSU	4	–	1	–	1	8	–	3	–	1
No. 14 Auburn	4	–	2	–	0	9	–	3	–	0
Vanderbilt	4	–	2	–	0	8	–	4	–	0
Tennessee	3	–	2	–	1	6	–	5	–	1
Alabama	3	–	3	–	0	8	–	4	–	0
Florida	3	–	3	–	0	8	–	4	–	0
Mississippi State	2	–	4	–	0	5	–	6	–	0
Ole Miss	0	–	6	–	0	4	–	7	–	0
Kentucky	0	–	6	–	0	0	–	10	–	1
$ – Conference champion; Rankings from AP Poll

The 1982 Alabama Crimson Tide football team (variously "Alabama", "UA" or "Bama") represented the University of Alabama in the 1982 NCAA Division I-A football season. It was the Crimson Tide's 88th overall and 49th season as a member of the Southeastern Conference (SEC). The team was led by head coach Bear Bryant, in his 25th and final year, and played their home games at Bryant–Denny Stadium in Tuscaloosa and Legion Field in Birmingham, Alabama. They finished season with eight wins and four losses (8–4 overall, 3–3 in the SEC) and with a victory over Illinois in the Liberty Bowl.

Alabama was 5–0 after they defeated Penn State 42–21, with the decisive play coming when a Penn State player blocked his own team's punt. But after that it was all downhill. Paul Bryant's last season as Alabama football coach saw a nine-game winning streak against Auburn and eleven-game winning streaks against Tennessee and LSU all come to an end. The loss to Southern Miss was Alabama's first loss in Tuscaloosa since 1963, breaking a 57-game win streak in Bryant–Denny Stadium. Coach Bryant retired after Alabama's bowl victory against Illinois and died less than one month later, on January 26, 1983.

== Schedule ==
Date	Time	Opponent	Rank	Site	TV	Result	Attendance	Source
September 11	12:30 p.m.	at Georgia Tech*	No. 4	Grant Field; Atlanta, GA (rivalry)		W 45–7	57,126	
September 18	1:30 p.m.	at Ole Miss	No. 4	Mississippi Veterans Memorial Stadium; Jackson, MS (rivalry)		W 42–14	62,385	
September 25	1:30 p.m.	Vanderbilt	No. 4	Bryant–Denny Stadium; Tuscaloosa, AL		W 24–21	60,210	
October 2	7:30 p.m.	Arkansas State*	No. 5	Legion Field; Birmingham, AL		W 34–7	67,459	
October 9	12:30 p.m.	No. 3 Penn State*	No. 4	Legion Field; Birmingham, AL (rivalry)	CBS	W 42–21	76,821	
October 16	1:00 p.m.	at Tennessee	No. 2	Neyland Stadium; Knoxville, TN (Third Saturday in October)		L 28–35	95,342	
October 23	1:30 p.m.	Cincinnati*^{†}	No. 7	Bryant–Denny Stadium; Tuscaloosa, AL		W 21–3	60,210	
October 30	1:30 p.m.	at Mississippi State	No. 9	Mississippi Veterans Memorial Stadium; Jackson, MS (rivalry)		W 20–12	62,110	
November 6	1:30 p.m.	No. 11 LSU	No. 8	Legion Field; Birmingham, AL (rivalry)		L 10–20	77,230	
November 13	1:30 p.m.	Southern Miss*	No. 17	Bryant–Denny Stadium; Tuscaloosa, AL		L 29–38	60,210	
November 27	11:00 a.m.	vs. Auburn		Legion Field; Birmingham, AL (Iron Bowl)	ABC	L 22–23	76,300	
December 29	7:00 p.m.	vs. Illinois*		Liberty Bowl Memorial Stadium; Memphis, TN (Liberty Bowl)	MetroSports	W 21–15	54,123	
*Non-conference game; ^{†}Homecoming; Rankings from AP Poll released prior to the game; All times are in Central time; Source:
