= 1982 NCAA Division I-A football season =

American college football season

1982 NCAA Division I-A season
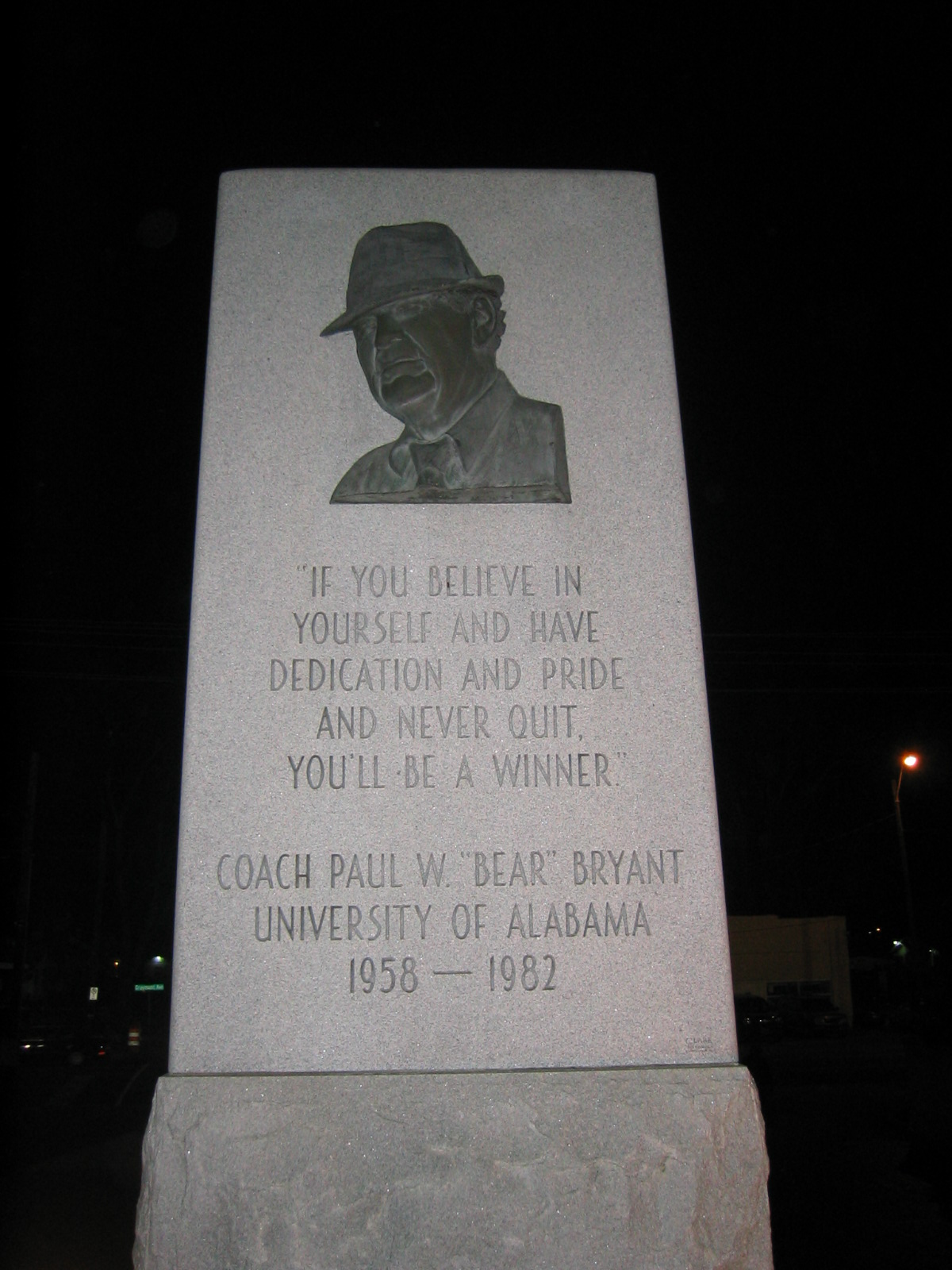
- Memorial for legendary coach Bear Bryant, who retired after the 1982 season, and died 28 days later.
- Number of teams: 97
- Preseason AP No. 1: Pittsburgh

Postseason
- Duration: December 17, 1982 – January 1, 1983
- Bowl games: 16
- Heisman Trophy: Georgia running back Herschel Walker
- Champion(s): Penn State (AP, Coaches, FWAA)

Division I-A football seasons
- ← 1981 1983 →

The 1982 NCAA Division I-A football season was the last for Paul "Bear" Bryant as head coach at Alabama, retiring with 323 victories in 38 seasons.

The Penn State Nittany Lions won their first consensus national championship, closing out an 11–1 season by defeating Georgia and Heisman Trophy winner Herschel Walker 27–23 in the Sugar Bowl to edge out undefeated SMU for the national championship. It was Joe Paterno's first national championship, after three undefeated non-championship seasons.

UCLA moved from the Los Angeles Memorial Coliseum to the Rose Bowl and fulfilled a promise made by coach Terry Donahue by closing out their season there as well, beating Michigan 24–14 in the Rose Bowl on New Year's Day.

It is also the year of "The Play", an improbable finish to the annual rivalry game between Cal and Stanford.

The Aloha Bowl premiered in Honolulu, Hawaii, and was won by Washington.

The California Bowl would have the only documented I-AA (FCS) vs I-A (FBS) bowl game.

== Rule changes ==
- The penalty for incidental grasping of a facemask was reduced from 15 yards to 5 yards. The 5 yard version of this penalty would be later abolished in the 2008 season.
- Coaches are no longer allowed to request a conference with the referee regarding a misapplication or misinterpretation of a rule, modifying a 1981 rule permitting such conferences, though a player or substitute can still request them.
- The penalty for offensive pass interference or illegal touching of a forward pass in the end zone was changed to a 15-yard penalty (5 yards for illegal touching) from a touchback.
- Penalties on the defense for fouls committed away from a catchable ball will be enforced from the previous spot and will no longer be considered pass interference.
- Intentional grounding where the spot of enforcement is in the end zone will no longer result in an automatic safety. The defense will have the option to take the result of the play or the safety.
- Intentional grounding will not be called if a passer throws the ball out of bounds to conserve time.
- Penalties against the offense that occur behind the scrimmage line will be enforced from the previous spot and not from the spot of the foul.
- Use of adhesive material (such as stickum) is prohibited, mirroring the NFL's outlawing of such products in 1981.
- The penalty for ineligible receiver downfield was reduced from 15 yards plus loss of down to 5 yards plus loss of down.

== Conference changes and new programs ==
=== Conference Reclassification ===
- This was the first season the Ivy League, Southern Conference, and Southland Conference competed at the I-AA (FCS) level. Southwestern Louisiana was the only team from those three conferences to remain in Division I-A, becoming an independent.
  - Ivy League — Brown, Columbia, Cornell, Dartmouth, Harvard, Pennsylvania, Princeton, and Yale
  - Southern Conference — Appalachian State, Chattanooga, East Tennessee State, Furman, Marshall, The Citadel, VMI, and Western Carolina
  - Southland Conference — Arkansas State, Lamar, Louisiana Tech, McNeese State, and Texas–Arlington
    - Southwestern Louisiana, who had been a member of the Southland during the 1981 season, remained in Division I-A as an Independent. The school was renamed the University of Louisiana at Lafayette in 1999.
- Most of the Missouri Valley Conference football schools were also reclassified. This began the few years where the MVC hosted both I-A and I-AA teams. Drake, Illinois State, Indiana State, Southern Illinois, and West Texas State did not meet I-A standards and were reclassified to I-AA. New Mexico State, Tulsa, and Wichita State remained in I-A.
- The Mid-American Conference spent this one season as a I-AA conference with all its members except Toledo and Central Michigan also forced to play as I-AA members for the year, this was immediately appealed and Bowling Green State University became the only I-AA school to face off against a I-A opponent in a bowl game during the 1982 California Bowl.

Conference	1981 Classification	1982 Classification
Ivy League	I-A	I-AA
MAC	I-A	I-A/I-AA (Hybrid)
Missouri Valley	I-A	I-A/I-AA (Hybrid)
Southern Conference	I-A	I-AA
Southland Conference	I-A	I-AA

=== Other Conference Changes ===
- This season also saw the loss of Division I-A independent teams Colgate, Holy Cross, Northeast Louisiana, North Texas State, Richmond, and William & Mary.
- Cincinnati was able to avoid demotion from Division I-A this season due to a court injunction. They'd then be put into Division I-AA for the 1983 season, just so they could be returned to I-A for the 1984 season onward.
- UNLV, previously a I-A Independent, joined the PCAA.

School	1981 Conference	1982 Conference
Colgate Raiders	I-A Independent	I-AA Independent
Holy Cross Crusaders	I-A Independent	I-AA Independent
Northeast Louisiana Indians	I-A Independent	Southland (I-AA)
North Texas State Mean Green	I-A Independent	I-AA Independent
Richmond Spiders	I-A Independent	I-AA Independent
Southwestern Louisiana	Southland	I-A Independent
UNLV Rebels	I-A Independent	PCAA (Big West)
William & Mary Tribe	I-A Independent	I-AA Independent

== Conference standings ==
1982 Atlantic Coast Conference football standings
	Conf.					Overall
Team	W		L		T	W		L		T
No. 8 Clemson $	6	–	0	–	0	9	–	1	–	1
No. 20 Maryland	5	–	1	–	0	8	–	4	–	0
No. 18 North Carolina	3	–	3	–	0	8	–	4	–	0
Duke	3	–	3	–	0	6	–	5	–	0
NC State	3	–	3	–	0	6	–	5	–	0
Virginia	1	–	5	–	0	2	–	9	–	0
Wake Forest	0	–	6	–	0	3	–	8	–	0
$ – Conference champion; Rankings from AP Poll

1982 Big Eight Conference football standings
	Conf.					Overall
Team	W		L		T	W		L		T
No. 3 Nebraska $	7	–	0	–	0	12	–	1	–	0
No. 16 Oklahoma	6	–	1	–	0	8	–	4	–	0
Oklahoma State	3	–	2	–	2	4	–	5	–	2
Kansas State	3	–	3	–	1	6	–	5	–	1
Missouri	2	–	3	–	2	5	–	4	–	2
Iowa State	1	–	5	–	1	4	–	6	–	1
Kansas	1	–	5	–	1	2	–	7	–	2
Colorado	1	–	5	–	1	2	–	8	–	1
$ – Conference champion; Rankings from AP Poll

1982 Big Ten Conference football standings
	Conf.					Overall
Team	W		L		T	W		L		T
Michigan $	8	–	1	–	0	8	–	4	–	0
No. 12 Ohio State	7	–	1	–	0	9	–	3	–	0
Iowa	6	–	2	–	0	8	–	4	–	0
Illinois	6	–	3	–	0	7	–	5	–	0
Wisconsin	5	–	4	–	0	7	–	5	–	0
Indiana	4	–	5	–	0	5	–	6	–	0
Purdue	3	–	6	–	0	3	–	8	–	0
Northwestern	2	–	7	–	0	3	–	8	–	0
Michigan State	2	–	7	–	0	2	–	9	–	0
Minnesota	1	–	8	–	0	3	–	8	–	0
$ – Conference champion; Rankings from AP Poll

1982 Mid-American Conference football standings
	Conf.					Overall
Team	W		L		T	W		L		T
Bowling Green $	7	–	2	–	0	7	–	5	–	0
Western Michigan	5	–	2	–	2	7	–	2	–	2
Miami (OH)	5	–	3	–	0	7	–	4	–	0
Central Michigan	5	–	3	–	1	6	–	4	–	1
Ohio	5	–	4	–	0	6	–	5	–	0
Toledo	5	–	4	–	0	6	–	5	–	0
Northern Illinois	5	–	4	–	0	5	–	5	–	0
Ball State	4	–	4	–	0	5	–	6	–	0
Eastern Michigan	1	–	7	–	1	1	–	9	–	1
Kent State	0	–	9	–	0	0	–	11	–	0
$ – Conference champion; The conference was a hybrid of NCAA Division I-A and I-AA programs. Central Michigan and Toledo were I-A while the other teams were classified as I-AA for the 1982 season only.

1982 Missouri Valley Conference football standings
	Conf.					Overall
Team	W		L		T	W		L		T
Tulsa $	6	–	0	–	0	10	–	1	–	0
Wichita State	4	–	1	–	0	8	–	3	–	0
Southern Illinois	4	–	1	–	0	6	–	5	–	0
Indiana State	3	–	2	–	0	5	–	6	–	0
Drake	2	–	4	–	0	4	–	7	–	0
New Mexico State	1	–	4	–	0	3	–	8	–	0
West Texas State	1	–	4	–	0	3	–	8	–	0
Illinois State	0	–	5	–	0	2	–	9	–	0
$ – Conference champion; The conference was a hybrid of NCAA Division I-A and I-AA programs. New Mexico State, Tulsa, and Wichita State were I-A and the other teams were I-AA.

1982 Pacific Coast Athletic Association football standings
	Conf.					Overall
Team	W		L		T	W		L		T
Fresno State $	6	–	0	–	0	11	–	1	–	0
Long Beach State	5	–	1	–	0	6	–	5	–	0
San Jose State	4	–	2	–	0	8	–	3	–	0
Utah State	2	–	3	–	0	5	–	6	–	0
Pacific (CA)	2	–	4	–	0	2	–	9	–	0
UNLV	1	–	4	–	0	3	–	8	–	0
Cal State Fullerton	0	–	6	–	0	3	–	9	–	0
$ – Conference champion

1982 Pacific-10 Conference football standings
	Conf.					Overall
Team	W		L		T	W		L		T
No. 5 UCLA $	5	–	1	–	1	10	–	1	–	1
No. 7 Washington	6	–	2	–	0	10	–	2	–	0
No. 6 Arizona State	5	–	2	–	0	10	–	2	–	0
No. 15 USC	5	–	2	–	0	8	–	3	–	0
Arizona	4	–	3	–	1	6	–	4	–	1
California	4	–	4	–	0	7	–	4	–	0
Stanford	3	–	5	–	0	5	–	6	–	0
Washington State	2	–	4	–	1	3	–	7	–	1
Oregon	2	–	6	–	0	2	–	8	–	1
Oregon State	0	–	7	–	1	1	–	9	–	1
$ – Conference champion; Rankings from AP Poll

1982 Southeastern Conference football standings
	Conf.					Overall
Team	W		L		T	W		L		T
No. 4 Georgia $	6	–	0	–	0	11	–	1	–	0
No. 11 LSU	4	–	1	–	1	8	–	3	–	1
No. 14 Auburn	4	–	2	–	0	9	–	3	–	0
Vanderbilt	4	–	2	–	0	8	–	4	–	0
Tennessee	3	–	2	–	1	6	–	5	–	1
Alabama	3	–	3	–	0	8	–	4	–	0
Florida	3	–	3	–	0	8	–	4	–	0
Mississippi State	2	–	4	–	0	5	–	6	–	0
Ole Miss	0	–	6	–	0	4	–	7	–	0
Kentucky	0	–	6	–	0	0	–	10	–	1
$ – Conference champion; Rankings from AP Poll

1982 Southwest Conference football standings
	Conf.					Overall
Team	W		L		T	W		L		T
No. 2 SMU $	7	–	0	–	1	11	–	0	–	1
No. 17 Texas	7	–	1	–	0	9	–	3	–	0
No. 9 Arkansas	5	–	2	–	1	9	–	2	–	1
Houston	4	–	3	–	1	5	–	5	–	1
Baylor	3	–	4	–	1	4	–	6	–	1
Texas Tech	3	–	5	–	0	4	–	7	–	0
Texas A&M	3	–	5	–	0	5	–	6	–	0
TCU	2	–	6	–	0	3	–	8	–	0
Rice	0	–	8	–	0	0	–	11	–	0
$ – Conference champion; Rankings from AP Poll

1982 Western Athletic Conference football standings
	Conf.					Overall
Team	W		L		T	W		L		T
BYU $	7	–	1	–	0	8	–	4	–	0
New Mexico	6	–	1	–	0	10	–	1	–	0
Air Force	4	–	3	–	0	8	–	5	–	0
San Diego State	4	–	3	–	0	7	–	5	–	0
Hawaii	4	–	4	–	0	6	–	5	–	0
Colorado State	3	–	5	–	0	4	–	7	–	0
Utah	2	–	4	–	0	5	–	6	–	0
Wyoming	2	–	6	–	0	5	–	7	–	0
UTEP	1	–	6	–	0	2	–	10	–	0
$ – Conference champion

1982 NCAA Division I-A independents football records
	Conf.					Overall
Team	W		L		T	W		L		T
No. 1 Penn State		–		–		11	–	1	–	0
No. 10 Pittsburgh		–		–		9	–	3	–	0
No. 13 Florida State		–		–		9	–	3	–	0
No. 19 West Virginia		–		–		9	–	3	–	0
Boston College		–		–		8	–	3	–	1
Southwestern Louisiana		–		–		7	–	3	–	1
East Carolina		–		–		7	–	4	–	0
Miami (FL)		–		–		7	–	4	–	0
Southern Miss		–		–		7	–	4	–	0
Virginia Tech		–		–		7	–	4	–	0
Notre Dame		–		–		6	–	4	–	1
Cincinnati		–		–		6	–	5	–	0
Georgia Tech		–		–		6	–	5	–	0
Navy		–		–		6	–	5	–	0
Louisville		–		–		5	–	6	–	0
Rutgers		–		–		5	–	6	–	0
Army		–		–		4	–	7	–	0
South Carolina		–		–		4	–	7	–	0
Temple		–		–		4	–	7	–	0
Tulane		–		–		4	–	7	–	0
Syracuse		–		–		2	–	9	–	0
Memphis State		–		–		1	–	10	–	0
Rankings from AP Poll

== Notable rivalry games ==
- Arizona 28, ASU 18
- Auburn 23, Alabama 22 (Auburn's first victory in the series since 1972; Alabama coach Bear Bryant's last regular season game)
- Cal 25, Stanford 20 (The Play)
- UCLA 20, USC 19 – In the first game of this rivalry contested at the Rose Bowl, USC trailed 20–13 and had fourth down and goal from the one-yard line with 0:01 left in the game. USC scored a touchdown and decided to go for the two-point conversion with 0:00 on the clock. USC announcer Tom Kelly remarked, "Typical of this great rivalry--even when it's over, it isn't over!" On the ensuing try for two by USC, UCLA's Karl Morgan sacked USC QB Scott Tinsley. This occurred within minutes of The Play, which was happening 400 miles to the north in Berkeley.
- Washington State 24, No. 5 Washington 20 (Washington State's first Apple Cup victory since 1973).
- USC 17, Notre Dame 13
- Tulane 31, No. 7 LSU 28 (Tulane's first win at Tiger Stadium since 1948 and the Green Wave's most recent victory in the series. The series has not been played annually since 1994 and not at all since 2009.)
- Ohio St. 24, Michigan 14
- No. 8 Nebraska 28, No. 11 Oklahoma 24
- No. 8 Penn St 27, No. 2 Nebraska 24

== September ==
Pittsburgh, with a 33–3 record in the past three seasons and quarterback Dan Marino heading into his senior year, was No. 1 in the preseason AP Poll despite the departure of head coach Jackie Sherrill to Texas A&M. The Panthers were followed by No. 2 Washington, No. 3 Alabama, No. 4 Nebraska, and No. 5 North Carolina. In the first regular-season poll on September 6 (taken before any of the top five teams had begun their schedules), Nebraska and Alabama switched places to No. 3 and No. 4, respectively.

September 11: No. 1 Pittsburgh defeated No. 5 North Carolina 7–6. Nevertheless, No. 2 Washington moved ahead of Pitt in the next poll with a 55–0 shutout of UTEP. No. 3 Nebraska beat Iowa 42–7, No. 4 Alabama won 45–7 at Georgia Tech, and No. 6 Florida (which had already defeated then-No. 15 Miami a week earlier) beat No. 10 USC 17–9. The next poll featured No. 1 Washington, No. 2 Pittsburgh, No. 3 Nebraska, No. 4 Alabama, and No. 5 Florida.

September 18: No. 1 Washington opened their conference schedule with a 23–13 win at Arizona, while No. 2 Pittsburgh beat Florida State 37–17 in Tallahassee. The Panthers were again leapfrogged by a team that dominated a weak opponent, as No. 3 Nebraska beat New Mexico 68–0. No. 4 Alabama defeated Mississippi 42–14, and No. 5 Florida was idle. The next poll featured No. 1 Washington, No. 2 Nebraska, No. 3 Pittsburgh, No. 4 Alabama, and No. 5 Florida.

September 25: No. 1 Washington defeated Oregon 37–21, while No. 2 Nebraska lost at No. 8 Penn State by a score of 27–24. The outcome of the game was controversial as Penn State tight end Mike McCloskey would later admit possibly catching a key pass out of bounds before the winning touchdown.. No. 3 Pittsburgh beat No. 19 Illinois 20–3. No. 4 Alabama looked vulnerable in a 24–21 win over Vanderbilt while No. 5 Florida defeated Mississippi State 27–17, and the two teams switched places in the next poll: No. 1 Washington, No. 2 Pittsburgh, No. 3 Penn State, No. 4 Florida, and No. 5 Alabama.

== October ==
October 2: No. 1 Washington beat San Diego State 46–25, and No. 2 Pittsburgh came back from a 13-0 fourth-quarter deficit to win 16–13 over No. 14 West Virginia. No. 3 Penn State was idle. No. 4 Florida lost at home to LSU 24–13. No. 5 Alabama defeated Arkansas State 34–7, and No. 6 Georgia won 29–22 at Mississippi State. The next poll featured No. 1 Washington, No. 2 Pittsburgh, No. 3 Penn State, No. 4 Alabama, and No. 5 Georgia.

October 9: No. 1 Washington dominated California 50–7. No. 2 Pittsburgh was idle. No. 4 Alabama defeated No. 3 Penn State in Birmingham 42–21. No. 5 Georgia beat Mississippi 33–10, while No. 6 SMU won 22–19 at Baylor. Alabama moved up in the next poll: No. 1 Washington, No. 2 Alabama, No. 3 Pittsburgh, No. 4 Georgia, and No. 5 SMU.

October 16: No. 1 Washington won 34–17 at Oregon State. No. 2 Alabama was knocked off in Knoxville by Tennessee, 35–28, the Volunteers’ first victory over the Crimson Tide in twelve years. After a 5–0 start and a big win over Penn State, Alabama would lose four of their last six regular-season games to end coach Bear Bryant's storied career. No. 3 Pittsburgh beat Temple 38–7, No. 4 Georgia defeated Vanderbilt 27–13, No. 5 SMU won 20–14 over Houston, and No. 6 Nebraska beat Kansas State 42–13. The next poll featured No. 1 Washington, No. 2 Pittsburgh, No. 3 Georgia, No. 4 SMU, and No. 5 Nebraska.

October 23: No. 1 Washington struggled to beat Texas Tech 10-3 while No. 2 Pittsburgh shut out Syracuse 14–0, leading the two teams to switch places at the top. No. 3 Georgia won 27–14 at Kentucky, and No. 4 SMU defeated No. 19 Texas 30–17. No. 5 Nebraska squeaked by Missouri 23-19 while No. 6 Arkansas blasted Houston 38–3, leading to another change in the next poll: No. 1 Pittsburgh, No. 2 Washington, No. 3 Georgia, No. 4 SMU, and No. 5 Arkansas.

October 30: No. 1 Pittsburgh beat Louisville 63–14, while John Elway and Stanford stunned No. 2 Washington in a 43–31 shootout. No. 3 Georgia defeated Memphis 34-3 but was still passed by No. 4 SMU, which drubbed Texas A&M 47–9. No. 5 Arkansas hosted Rice and won 24–6. No. 7 Arizona State beat No. 12 USC 17–10 to remain undefeated and move up in the next poll: No. 1 Pittsburgh, No. 2 SMU, No. 3 Georgia, No. 4 Arizona State, and No. 5 Arkansas.

== November ==
November 6: No. 1 Pittsburgh was stunned at home by Notre Dame, 31–16. The teams behind them switched spots again, as No. 2 SMU won 41–14 at Rice but No. 3 Georgia was even more impressive with a 44–0 shutout of No. 20 Florida. No. 4 Arizona State beat Oregon State 30–16, but No. 5 Arkansas fell 24–17 to Baylor. Moving back into the top five were No. 6 Nebraska, which defeated Oklahoma State 48–10, and No. 7 Penn State, which blanked North Carolina State 54–0. The poll featured No. 1 Georgia, No. 2 SMU, No. 3 Arizona State, No. 4 Nebraska, and No. 5 Penn State.

November 13: No. 1 Georgia won at Auburn, 19–14, to clinch the SEC title and a Sugar Bowl berth, while No. 2 SMU traveled to Lubbock and beat Texas Tech 34–27. In a Pac-10 showdown in Tempe, No. 7 Washington beat No. 3 Arizona State 17–13. No. 4 Nebraska defeated Iowa State 48-10 but was passed in the next poll by No. 5 Penn State, who had beaten them in September and won 24-14 this week at No. 13 Notre Dame. The poll featured No. 1 Georgia, No. 2 SMU, No. 3 Penn State, No. 4 Nebraska, and No. 5 Washington.

November 20: No. 1 Georgia, No. 3 Penn State, and No. 4 Nebraska were idle. Meanwhile, No. 2 SMU and No. 9 Arkansas—the first- and second-place teams in the SWC—matched up against each other. In a controversial late-game decision, SMU coach Bobby Collins chose to tie the game with an extra point rather than try for a two-point conversion which would have given the Mustangs the lead. Neither team was able to score in the remaining time, resulting in a 17–17 tie. By avoiding a loss, SMU clinched the SWC title and a Cotton Bowl berth, but damaged their national championship prospects by giving up their chance at a perfect record. (Ironically, the sacrifice turned out to be unnecessary, as Arkansas went on to lose their final game and would have finished behind SMU in the conference standings even with a head-to-head win.) No. 5 Washington lost 24–20 to Washington State on an exciting day in the Pac-10 which also featured a last-second 20–19 victory by No. 11 UCLA over No. 15 USC as well as "The Play" between California and Stanford. No. 6 Pittsburgh defeated Rutgers 52-6 and moved up in the next poll: No. 1 Georgia, No. 2 Penn State, No. 3 Nebraska, No. 4 SMU, and No. 5 Pittsburgh.

November 26–27: No. 1 Georgia finished their season by defeating Georgia Tech 38–18. In a game between teams trying to stay alive for the national title, No. 2 Penn State shut down No. 5 Pittsburgh 19–10. No. 3 Nebraska faced No. 11 Oklahoma for the Big 8 championship and an Orange Bowl berth, and the Cornhuskers won 28–24. No. 4 SMU had finished its schedule. No. 6 Arizona State needed a win over rival Arizona to clinch the Pac-10 title and a Rose Bowl berth, but the Sun Devils lost 28–18, and No. 8 UCLA (which had finished its schedule with the USC win) was elevated to first place. Their opponent would be No. 20 Michigan, which won the Big Ten championship despite a loss in their rivalry game against Ohio State.

The final AP Poll of the regular season featured No. 1 Georgia, No. 2 Penn State, No. 3 Nebraska, No. 4 SMU, and No. 5 UCLA. The Sugar Bowl would match up Georgia and Penn State in a de facto national title game, the Cotton Bowl featured SMU and No. 6 Pittsburgh, the Orange Bowl selected SEC runner-up No. 13 LSU to face Nebraska, and the Rose Bowl had the traditional Big Ten/Pac-10 showdown between UCLA and Michigan.

== No. 1 and No. 2 progress ==
WEEKS	No. 1	No. 2	Event	
PRE-1	Pittsburgh	Washington	Washington 55, UTEP 0	Sep 11
2	Washington	Pittsburgh	Nebraska 68, New Mexico St. 0	Sep 18
3	Washington	Nebraska	Penn State 27, Nebraska 24	Sep 25
4–5	Washington	Pittsburgh	Alabama 34, Arkansas St 7	Oct 2
6	Washington	Alabama	Tennessee 35, Alabama 28	Oct 16
7	Washington	Pittsburgh	Pittsburgh 14, Syracuse 0	Oct 23
8	Pittsburgh	Washington	Stanford 43, Washington 31	Oct 30
9	Pittsburgh	SMU	Notre Dame 31, Pitt 16	Nov 6
10–11	Georgia	SMU	Arkansas 17, SMU 17	Nov 20
12–14	Georgia	Penn State	Penn State 27, Georgia 23	Jan 1

== I-AA team wins over I-A teams ==
Italics denotes I-AA teams.

Date	Visiting team	Home team	Site	Result	Attendance	Ref.
September 4	Illinois State	Eastern Illinois	O'Brien Stadium • Charleston, Illinois (Mid-America Classic)	14–27	8,200	
September 11	Cal State Fullerton	Boise State	Bronco Stadium • Boise, Idaho	9–20	20,152	
September 11	Idaho State	Drake	Drake Stadium • Des Moines, Iowa	41–21	13,147	
September 18	Pacific (CA)	Idaho	Kibbie Dome • Moscow, Idaho	17–36	10,500	
September 18	James Madison	Virginia	Scott Stadium • Charlottesville, Virginia	21–17	23,524	
September 18	Northeast Louisiana	North Texas State	Fouts Field • Denton, Texas	38–15	9,450	
September 18	Illinois State	Western Illinois	Hanson Field • Macomb, Illinois	13–29	9,231	
September 25	Arkansas State	Southern Illinois	McAndrew Stadium • Carbondale, Illinois	35–30	16,500	
September 25	No. 7 (I-AA) Boise State	Pacific (CA)	Pacific Memorial Stadium • Stockton, California	22–15	10,500	
October 9	No. 17 (I-AA) Arkansas State	Southwestern Louisiana	Cajun Field • Lafayette, Louisiana	20–13	23,122	
October 16	Furman	South Carolina	Williams–Brice Stadium • Columbia, South Carolina	28–23	56,244	
October 16	Fresno State	Nevada	Mackay Stadium • Reno, Nevada	26–40	9,077	
October 16	Southwestern Louisiana	UT Arlington	Maverick Stadium • Arlington, Texas	29–30	6,094	
October 23	William & Mary	No. 20 (I-AA) James Madison	JMU Stadium • Harrisonburg, Virginia (rivalry)	18–24	14,750	
October 23	Nevada	Cal State Fullerton	Titan Field • Fullerton, California	17–7	3,500	
October 23	VMI	Richmond	City Stadium • Richmond, Virginia (Tobacco Bowl, rivalry)	14–0	12,197	
October 30	William & Mary	No. 4 (I-AA) Delaware	Delaware Stadium • Newark, Delaware (rivalry)	21–62	18,005	
October 30	Southern Illinois	Eastern Illinois	O'Brien Stadium • Charleston, Illinois	7–20	9,120	
November 6	Brown	William & Mary	Cary Field • Williamsburg, Virginia	23–22	16,000	
November 13	Utah State	Boise State	Bronco Stadium • Boise, Idaho	10–30	14,868	
November 13	Temple	Colgate	Andy Kerr Stadium • Hamilton, New York	17–24	4,000	
November 20	No. 7 (I-AA) Louisiana Tech	Southern Miss	M. M. Roberts Stadium • Hattiesburg, Mississippi (Rivalry in Dixie)	13–6	31,256	
^{#}Rankings from AP Poll released prior to game.

== Bowl games ==
New Year's Day Bowls:

- Sugar Bowl: No. 2 Penn State 27, No. 1 Georgia 23
- Orange Bowl: No. 3 Nebraska 21, No. 13 LSU 20
- Cotton Bowl: No. 4 SMU 7, No. 6 Pittsburgh 3
- Rose Bowl: No. 5 UCLA 24, No. 19 Michigan 14
- Fiesta Bowl: No. 11 Arizona State 32, No. 12 Oklahoma 21

Other Bowls:

- Sun: North Carolina 26, No. 8 Texas 10
- Gator: Florida State 31, No. 10 West Virginia 12
- Tangerine: No. 18 Auburn 33, Boston College 26
- Liberty: Alabama 21, Illinois 15
- Bluebonnet: No. 14 Arkansas 28, Florida 24
- Peach: Iowa 28, Tennessee 22
- Independence: Wisconsin 14, Kansas State 3
- Hall of Fame: Air Force 36, Vanderbilt 28
- Holiday: No. 17 Ohio State 47, Brigham Young 17
- Aloha: No. 9 Washington 21, No. 16 Maryland 20
- California: Fresno State 29, I-AA Bowling Green 28

== Final AP and UPI rankings ==
Rank	AP	UPI
1.	Penn State	Penn State
2.	SMU	SMU
3.	Nebraska	Nebraska
4.	Georgia	Georgia
5.	UCLA	UCLA
6.	Arizona State	Arizona State
7.	Washington	Washington
8.	Clemson	Arkansas
9.	Arkansas	Pittsburgh
10.	Pittsburgh	Florida State
11.	LSU	LSU
12.	Ohio State	Ohio State
13.	Florida State	North Carolina
14.	Auburn	Auburn
15.	USC	Michigan
16.	Oklahoma	Oklahoma
17.	Texas	Alabama
18.	North Carolina	Texas
19.	West Virginia	West Virginia
20.	Maryland	Maryland

== Heisman Trophy voting ==
The Heisman Trophy is given to the year's most outstanding player

Player	School	Position	1st	2nd	3rd	Total
Herschel Walker	Georgia	RB	525	155	41	1,926
John Elway	Stanford	QB	139	335	144	1,231
Eric Dickerson	SMU	RB	31	100	172	465
Anthony Carter	Michigan	WR	11	27	55	142
Dave Rimington	Nebraska	C	12	23	52	137
Todd Blackledge	Penn State	QB	4	26	44	108
Tom Ramsey	UCLA	QB	2	16	27	65
Tony Eason	Illinois	QB	5	6	33	60
Dan Marino	Pittsburgh	QB	1	6	32	47
Curt Warner	Penn State	RB	2	8	18	40
Mike Rozier	Nebraska	RB	4	8	12	40

== Attendances ==
Average home attendance top 3:

Rank	Team	Average
1	Michigan Wolverines	105,291
2	Tennessee Volunteers	93,517
3	Ohio State Buckeyes	89,022

== Other major awards ==
- Outland Trophy (Interior Lineman): Dave Rimington, Nebraska
- Vince Lombardi/Rotary Award (Lineman or Linebacker): Dave Rimington, Nebraska
- Walter Camp Award (back): Herschel Walker, Georgia
- Davey O'Brien Award (Quarterback): Todd Blackledge, Penn State
- Maxwell Award (college player of the year): Herschel Walker, Georgia
