= 1983 NFL draft =

1983 American football draft

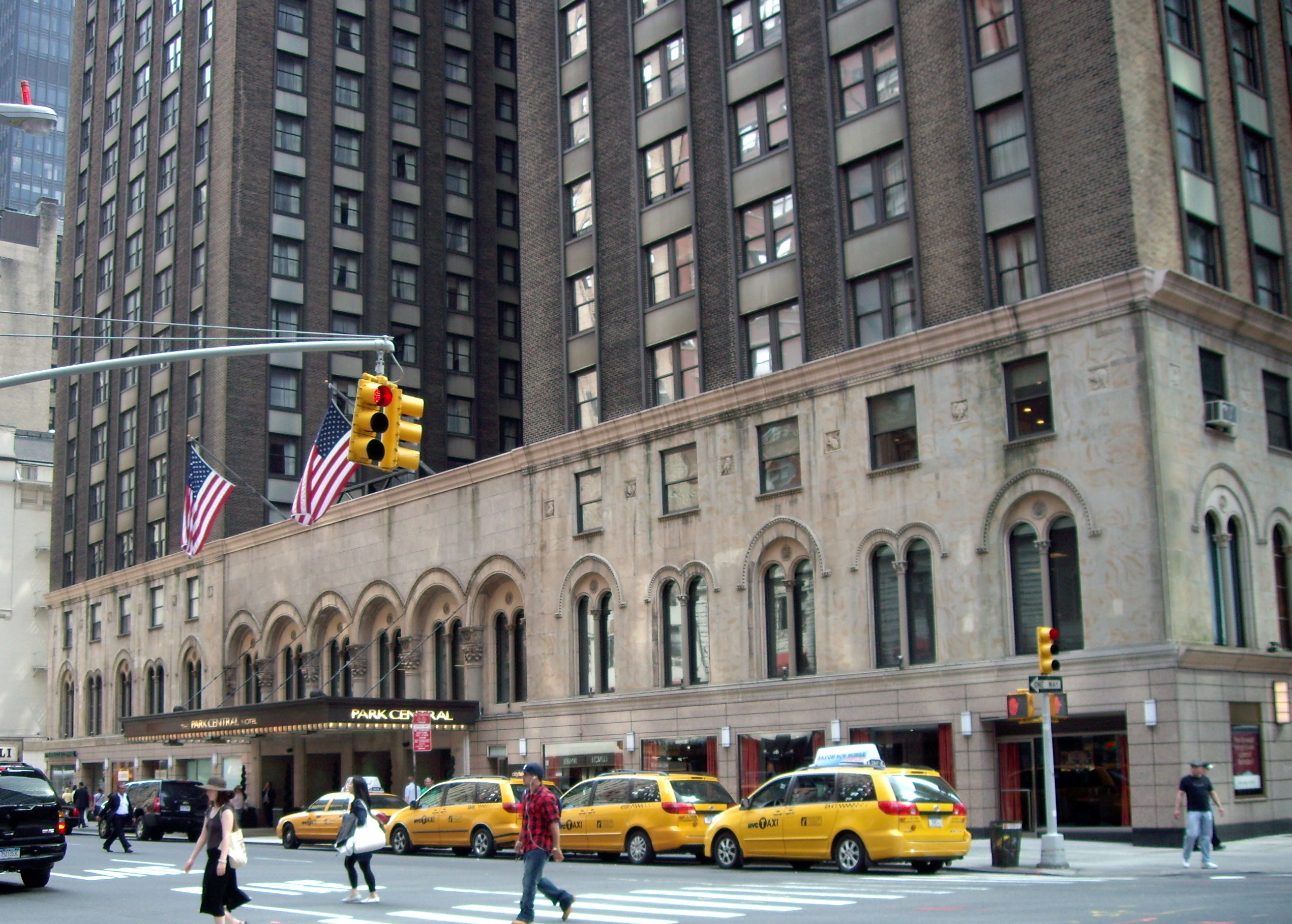
- The former Sheraton Hotel (draft venue), photographed in 2010

General information
- Date: April 26–27, 1983
- Location: New York Sheraton Hotel in New York City, New York
- Network: ESPN

Overview
- 335 total selections in 12 rounds
- League: National Football League
- First selection: John Elway, QB; Baltimore Colts
- Mr. Irrelevant: John Tuggle, RB; New York Giants
- Most selections (19): New England Patriots
- Fewest selections (5): New Orleans Saints
- Hall of Famers: 9: QB John Elway; RB Eric Dickerson; OT Jim Covert; OT Bruce Matthews; QB Jim Kelly; QB Dan Marino; CB Darrell Green; RB Roger Craig; DE Richard Dent

The 1983 NFL draft was the procedure by which National Football League teams selected amateur college football players. It is officially known as the NFL Annual Player Selection Meeting. The draft was held April 26–27, 1983, at the New York Sheraton Hotel in New York City, New York. No teams elected to claim any players in the supplemental draft that year.

The draft is frequently referred to as the quarterback class of 1983, because six quarterbacks were taken in the first round—John Elway, Todd Blackledge, Jim Kelly, Tony Eason, Ken O'Brien and Dan Marino—tied with the 2024 draft for the highest number taken. Of these quarterbacks, Elway, Kelly, Eason, and Marino played in the Super Bowl, Elway, Kelly, O'Brien, and Marino were selected to play in the Pro Bowl, and Elway, Kelly, and Marino have been inducted into the Pro Football Hall of Fame. All six quarterbacks were drafted by American Football Conference (AFC) teams, with every member of the five-team AFC East (the Baltimore Colts, Miami Dolphins, Buffalo Bills, New York Jets, and New England Patriots) selecting a quarterback. In eleven of the sixteen years following this draft, the AFC was represented in the Super Bowl by a team led by one of these quarterbacks: five with the Denver Broncos and Elway, four with the Bills and Kelly, one with the Dolphins and Marino, and one with the Patriots and Eason.

They met with little success in the Super Bowl, however, compiling a 2–9 record among them, with an 0–9 record for their first 14 years in the league. The only two wins were by Elway in XXXII and XXXIII during his final two seasons in 1997 and 1998. Three of the most lopsided Super Bowl losses in history also came at the hands of quarterbacks from the Class of '83: Elway, a 55–10 loss to the San Francisco 49ers in XXIV; Eason, a 46–10 loss to the Chicago Bears in XX; and Kelly, a 52–17 loss to the Dallas Cowboys in XXVII. Marino would only reach the Super Bowl once in a 38–16 loss to San Francisco in XIX following the end of his second season, when he won league MVP. Kelly and the Bills would appear in the Super Bowl for a record four consecutive years, from 1990 to 1993, but lost all four.

Of the six first round quarterbacks drafted, Hall of Famers Elway and Kelly did not sign with the teams that selected them for the 1983 season. Elway, who had made his antipathy towards the Colts and coach Frank Kush, a harsh disciplinarian, known long before the draft, was also a promising baseball player in the New York Yankees organization. With Yankees owner George Steinbrenner aggressively pursuing a commitment from Elway to play baseball full-time, Elway and his agent, Marvin Demoff, successfully leveraged the threat of Elway abandoning football altogether to compel the Colts to trade Elway to the Broncos a few days after selecting him with the first overall pick of the draft.

Kelly, the other holdout, instead signed with the Houston Gamblers of the United States Football League (USFL), where he led the springtime circuit in passing in both 1984 and 1985. Kelly was set to play for the New Jersey Generals when the USFL planned to switch to a fall season in 1986, but when the USFL won only $1 (tripled to $3) from its antitrust lawsuit vs. the NFL on July 29, 1986, Kelly finally signed with the Bills three weeks later.

Including the aforementioned Elway, Kelly, and Marino, a total of seven players drafted in the first round have been inducted into the Pro Football Hall of Fame, which is the most by any first round class, and a total of nine players overall have been inducted. Each round of this draft also contained at least one player who was later selected to play in the Pro Bowl. Several websites, including Bleacher Report and Athlon Sports, have called the class of 1983 the greatest of all time.

== Player selections ==
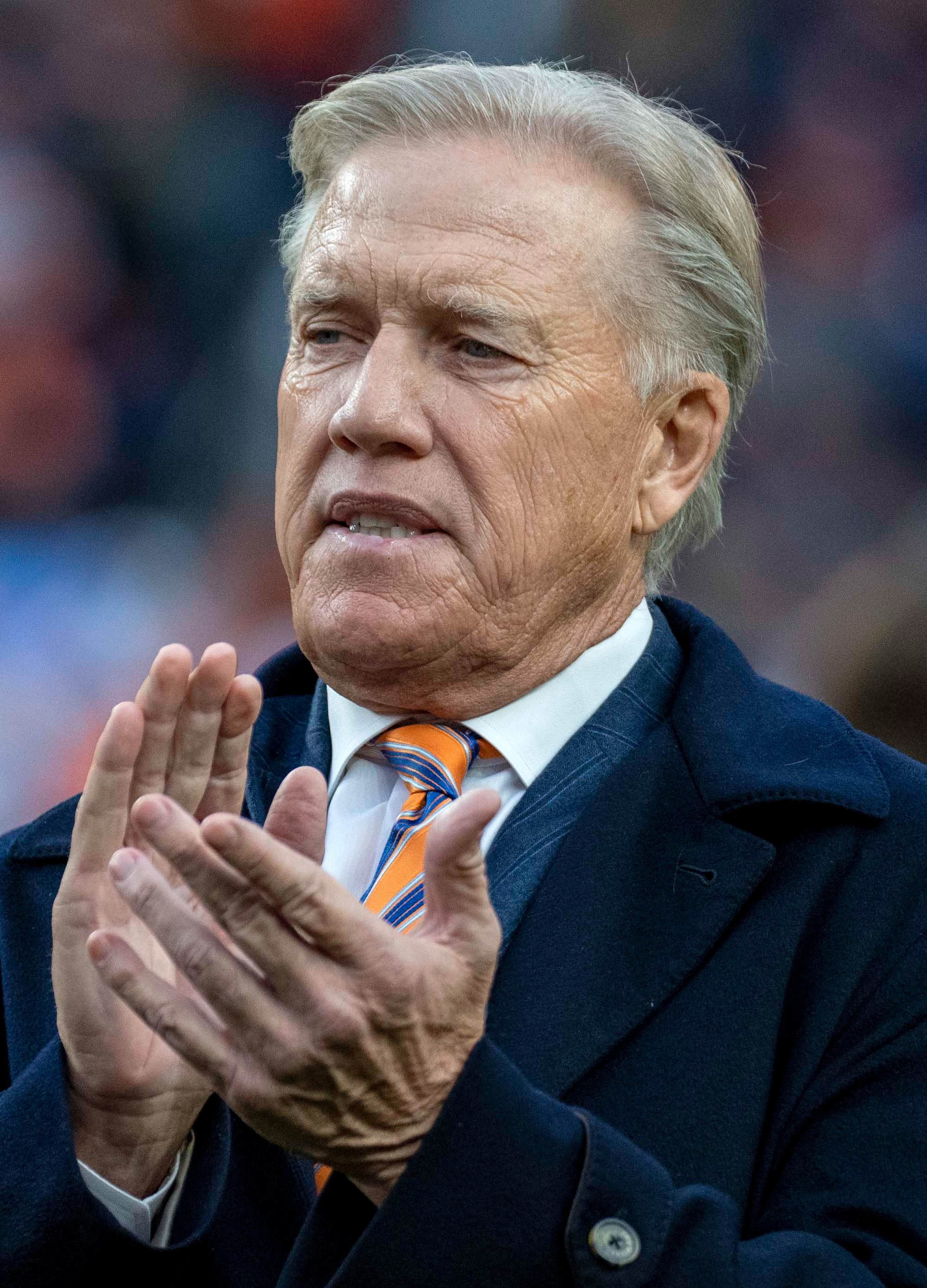
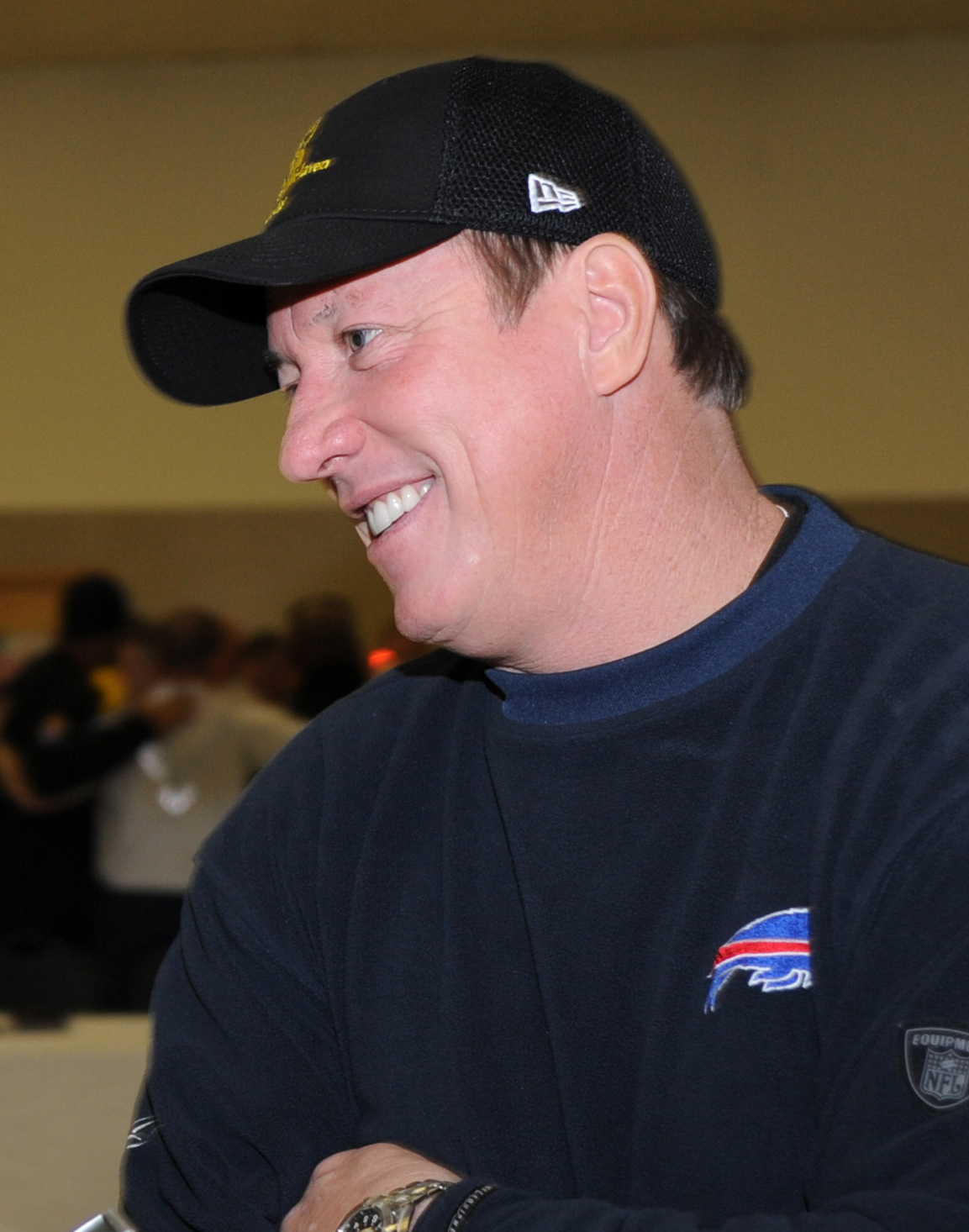
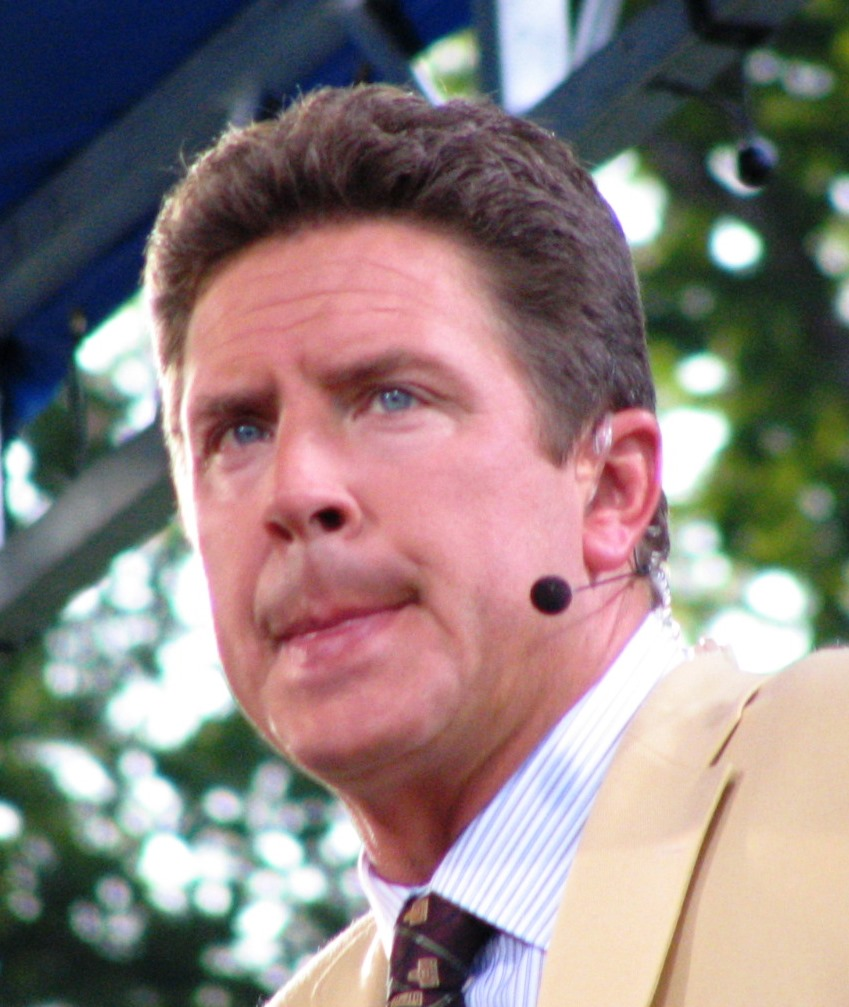
The famed "Quarterback Class of 1983" includes Hall of Famers John Elway, Jim Kelly, and Dan Marino (pictured from left to right).

*	Compensatory selection
†	Pro Bowler
‡	Hall of Famer

Positions key
Offense	Defense	Special teams
QB — Quarterback; RB — Running back; FB — Fullback; WR — Wide receiver; TE — Tight end; OL — Offensive lineman; T — Tackle; G — Guard; C — Center	DL — Defensive lineman; DT — Defensive tackle (Note: Includes nose tackle (NT)); DE — Defensive end; EDGE — Edge rusher; LB — Linebacker (Note: Includes middle linebacker (MLB/MIKE), weakside linebacker (WILL), strongside linebacker (SAM), off-ball linebacker, and outside linebacker (OLB)); DB — Defensive back; CB — Cornerback; S — Safety (Note: Includes free safety (FS) and strong safety (SS))	K — Kicker (Note: Also known as a placekicker (PK)); P — Punter; LS — Long snapper; RS — Return specialist (Note: Includes kickoff and punt returners)

Rnd.	Pick	Team	Player	Pos.	College	Notes
1	1	Baltimore Colts	John Elway^{‡}^{†}	QB	Stanford	
1	2	Los Angeles Rams	Eric Dickerson^{‡}^{†}	RB	SMU	from Houston (Note: No. 2: Houston → LA Rams (PD). Houston traded a first-round selection (2nd overall) to the LA Rams in exchange for first- and fourth-round selections (3rd and 88th overall), and a 1984 fourth-round selection.)
1	3	Seattle Seahawks	Curt Warner ^{†}	RB	Penn State	from LA Rams via Houston (Note: No. 3: LA Rams → Houston → Seattle. Multiple trades: LA Rams → Houston (PD). See Round 1: Houston → LA Rams. Houston → Seattle (PD). Houston traded a first-round selection (3rd overall) to Seattle in exchange for first-, second- and third-round selections (9th, 42nd and 69th overall).)
1	4	Denver Broncos	Chris Hinton ^{†}	G	Northwestern	
1	5	San Diego Chargers	Billy Ray Smith	LB	Arkansas	from San Francisco (Note: No. 5: San Francisco → San Diego (PD). San Francisco traded first- and second-round selections (5th and 36th overall) to San Diego in exchange for a first-round selection (22nd overall) and DE Fred Dean.)
1	6	Chicago Bears	Jim Covert^{‡}^{†}	T	Pittsburgh	
1	7	Kansas City Chiefs	Todd Blackledge	QB	Penn State	
1	8	Philadelphia Eagles	Michael Haddix	RB	Mississippi State	
1	9	Houston Oilers	Bruce Matthews^{‡}^{†}	T	USC	from Seattle (Note: No. 9: Seattle → Houston (PD). See Round 1: Houston → Seattle.)
1	10	New York Giants	Terry Kinard ^{†}	S	Clemson	
1	11	Green Bay Packers	Tim Lewis	CB	Pittsburgh	from New Orleans (Note: No. 11: New Orleans → Green Bay (PD). New Orleans traded a first-round selection (11th overall) to Green Bay in exchange for DE Bruce Clark.)
1	12	Buffalo Bills	Tony Hunter	TE	Notre Dame	
1	13	Detroit Lions	James Jones	FB	Florida	
1	14	Buffalo Bills	Jim Kelly^{‡}^{†}	QB	Miami (FL)	from Cleveland (Note: No. 14: Cleveland → Buffalo (PD). Cleveland traded a first-round selection (14th overall), a 1984 third-round selection and a 1985 fifth-round selection to Buffalo in exchange for LB Tom Cousineau.)
1	15	New England Patriots	Tony Eason	QB	Illinois	
1	16	Atlanta Falcons	Mike Pitts	DE	Alabama	
1	17	St. Louis Cardinals	Leonard Smith	CB	McNeese State	
1	18	Chicago Bears	Willie Gault	WR	Tennessee	from Tampa Bay (Note: No. 18: Tampa Bay → Chicago (PD). Tampa Bay traded a first-round selection (18th overall) to Chicago in exchange for a 1982 second-round selection.)
1	19	Minnesota Vikings	Joey Browner ^{†}	CB	USC	
1	20	San Diego Chargers	Gary Anderson ^{†}	RB	Arkansas	from Green Bay (Note: No. 20: Green Bay → San Diego (PD). Green Bay traded a first-round selection (20th overall), 1982 first- and second-round selections, a 1984 second-round selection and WR Aundra Thompson to San Diego in exchange for a 1982 first-round selection and WR John Jefferson.)
1	21	Pittsburgh Steelers	Gabriel Rivera	DT	Texas Tech	
1	22	San Diego Chargers	Gill Byrd ^{†}	CB	San Jose State	from San Diego via San Francisco (Note: No. 22: San Diego → San Francisco → San Diego. Multiple trades: San Diego → San Francisco (PD). See Round 1: San Francisco → San Diego. San Francisco → San Diego (PD). San Francisco traded a first-round selection (22nd overall) to San Diego in exchange for two second-round selections (36th and 49th overall).)
1	23	Dallas Cowboys	Jim Jeffcoat	DE	Arizona State	
1	24	New York Jets	Ken O'Brien ^{†}	QB	UC Davis	
1	25	Cincinnati Bengals	Dave Rimington	C	Nebraska	
1	26	Los Angeles Raiders	Don Mosebar ^{†}	C	USC	
1	27	Miami Dolphins	Dan Marino^{‡}^{†}	QB	Pittsburgh	
1	28	Washington Redskins	Darrell Green^{‡}^{†}	CB	Texas A&I	
2	29	Baltimore Colts	Vernon Maxwell	LB	Arizona State	
2	30	Houston Oilers	Harvey Salem	T	California	
2	31	Denver Broncos	Mark Cooper	T	Miami (FL)	
2	32	Los Angeles Rams	Henry Ellard ^{†}	WR	Fresno State	
2	33	Chicago Bears	Mike Richardson	CB	Arizona State	
2	34	Kansas City Chiefs	Dave Lutz	G	Georgia Tech	
2	35	Philadelphia Eagles	Wes Hopkins ^{†}	S	SMU	
2	36	Los Angeles Rams	Mike Wilcher	LB	North Carolina	from San Francisco via San Diego and San Francisco (Note: No. 36: San Francisco → San Diego → San Francisco → LA Rams. Multiple trades: San Francisco → San Diego (PD). See Round 1: San Francisco → San Diego. San Diego → San Francisco (PD). See Round 1: San Francisco → San Diego. San Francisco → LA Rams (PD). San Francisco traded second- and fourth-round selections (36th and 87th overall) to the LA Rams in exchange for a third-round selection (59th overall), RB Wendell Tyler and DT Cody Jones.)
2	37	New York Giants	Leonard Marshall ^{†}	DE	LSU	
2	38	New Orleans Saints	Steve Korte	C	Arkansas	
2	39	Buffalo Bills	Darryl Talley ^{†}	LB	West Virginia	
2	40	Detroit Lions	Rich Strenger	T	Michigan	
2	41	Cleveland Browns	Ron Brown ^{†}	WR	Arizona State	
2	42	Houston Oilers	Keith Bostic ^{†}	S	Michigan	from Seattle (Note: No. 42: Seattle → Houston (PD). See Round 1: Houston → Seattle.)
2	43	Atlanta Falcons	James Britt	CB	LSU	
2	44	St. Louis Cardinals	Cedric Mack	CB	Baylor	
2	45	Tampa Bay Buccaneers	Randy Grimes	C	Baylor	
2	46	Philadelphia Eagles	Jody Schulz	LB	East Carolina	
2	47	New England Patriots	Darryal Wilson	WR	Tennessee	
2	48	Green Bay Packers	Dave Drechsler	G	North Carolina	
2	49	San Francisco 49ers	Roger Craig^{‡}^{†}	RB	Nebraska	from San Diego (Note: No. 49: San Diego → San Francisco (PD). See Round 1: San Francisco → San Diego.)
2	50	Dallas Cowboys	Michael Walter	LB	Oregon	
2	51	New York Jets	Johnny Hector	RB	Texas A&M	
2	52	Pittsburgh Steelers	Wayne Capers	WR	Kansas	
2	53	Cincinnati Bengals	Ray Horton	S	Washington	
2	54	Los Angeles Raiders	Bill Pickel ^{†}	DT	Rutgers	
2	55	Miami Dolphins	Mike Charles	DT	Syracuse	
2	56	Washington Redskins	Richard Williams	RB	Memphis State	
3	57	Baltimore Colts	George Achica	DT	USC	
3	58	Houston Oilers	Tim Joiner	LB	LSU	
3	59	San Francisco 49ers	Blanchard Montgomery	LB	UCLA	from LA Rams (Note: No. 59: LA Rams → San Francisco (PD). See Round 2: San Francisco → LA Rams.)
3	60	Denver Broncos	Clint Sampson	WR	San Diego State	
3	61	Kansas City Chiefs	Albert Lewis ^{†}	CB	Grambling State	
3	62	Philadelphia Eagles	Glen Young	WR	Mississippi State	
3	63	New York Giants	Jamie Williams	TE	Nebraska	from San Francisco via LA Rams (Note: No. 63: San Francisco → LA Rams → NY Giants. Multiple trades: San Francisco → LA Rams (PD). San Francisco traded a third-round selection (63rd overall) and a 1980 third-round selection to the LA Rams in exchange for 1980 third- and fourth-round selections, and TE Charle Young. LA Rams → NY Giants (PD). The LA Rams traded third- and sixth-round selections (63rd and 153rd overall) to the NY Giants in exchange for DE Gary Jeter.)
3	64	Chicago Bears	Dave Duerson ^{†}	S	Notre Dame	
3	65	New Orleans Saints	John Tice	TE	Maryland	
3	66	New Orleans Saints	Cliff Austin	RB	Clemson	from Buffalo via St. Louis (Note: No. 66: Buffalo → St. Louis → New Orleans. Multiple trades: Buffalo → St. Louis (PD). Buffalo traded a third-round selection (66th overall) to St. Louis in exchange for a 1982 fourth-round selection. St. Louis → New Orleans (PD). St. Louis traded a third-round selection (66th overall) to New Orleans in exchange forDL Elois Grooms.)
3	67	Detroit Lions	Mike Cofer ^{†}	LB	Tennessee	
3	68	Cleveland Browns	Reggie Camp	DE	California	
3	69	Houston Oilers	Chris Dressel	TE	Stanford	from Seattle (Note: No. 69: Seattle → Houston (PD). See Round 1: Houston → Seattle.)
3	70	New York Giants	Karl Nelson	T	Iowa State	
3	71	St. Louis Cardinals	Ramsey Dardar	DT	LSU	
3	72	Tampa Bay Buccaneers	Jeremiah Castille	CB	Alabama	
3	73	Minnesota Vikings	Walker Lee Ashley	LB	Penn State	
3	74	New England Patriots	Stephen Starring	WR	McNeese State	
3	75	Atlanta Falcons	Andrew Provence	DT	South Carolina	
3	76	Miami Dolphins	Charles Benson	DE	Baylor	from Green Bay via Houston (Note: No. 76: Green Bay → Houston → Miami. Multiple trades: Green Bay → Houston (PD). Green Bay traded a third-round selection (76th overall) to Houston in exchange for OT Angelo Fields. Houston → Miami (D). Houston traded a third-round selection (76th overall) to Miami in exchange for third- and fifth-round selections (83rd and 139th overall).)
3	77	Dallas Cowboys	Bryan Caldwell	DE	Arizona State	
3	78	New York Jets	JoJo Townsell	WR	UCLA	
3	79	Pittsburgh Steelers	Todd Seabaugh	LB	San Diego State	
3	80	New England Patriots	Steve Moore	G	Tennessee State	from San Diego (Note: No. 80: San Diego → New England (PD). San Diego traded a third-round selection (80th overall) and a 1982 second-round selection to New England in exchange for S Tim Fox.)
3	81	Cincinnati Bengals	Jimmy Turner	S	UCLA	
3	82	Los Angeles Raiders	Tony Caldwell	LB	Washington	
3	83	Houston Oilers	Steve Brown	CB	Oregon	from Miami (Note: No. 83: Miami → Houston (D). See Round 3: Houston → Miami.)
3	84	Washington Redskins	Charles Mann ^{†}	DE	Nevada	
4	85	Baltimore Colts	Phil Smith	WR	San Diego State	
4	86	Houston Oilers	Greg Hill	CB	Oklahoma State	
4	87	Los Angeles Rams	Chuck Nelson	K	Washington	from Denver via San Francisco (Note: No. 87: Denver → San Francisco → LA Rams. Multiple trades: Denver → San Francisco (PD). Denver traded a fourth-round selection (87th overall) to San Francisco in exchange for QB Steve DeBerg. San Francisco → LA Rams (PD). See Round 2: San Francisco → LA Rams.)
4	88	Houston Oilers	Mike McCloskey	TE	Penn State	from LA Rams (Note: No. 88: LA Rams → Houston (PD). See Round 1: Houston → LA Rams.)
4	89	Philadelphia Eagles	Mike Williams	RB	Mississippi College	
4	90	San Francisco 49ers	Tom Holmoe	S	BYU	
4	91	Chicago Bears	Tom Thayer	C	Notre Dame	
4	92	Kansas City Chiefs	Ron Wetzel	TE	Arizona State	
4	93	Buffalo Bills	Trey Junkin	LB	Louisiana Tech	
4	94	Detroit Lions	August Curley	LB	USC	
4	95	San Diego Chargers	Danny Walters	CB	Arkansas	from Cleveland (Note: No. 95: Cleveland → San Diego (PD). Cleveland traded a fourth-round selection (95th overall) and a 1981 fourth-round selection to San Diego in exchange for LB Don Goode.)
4	96	St. Louis Cardinals	Mark Duda	DT	Maryland	from Seattle (Note: No. 96: Seattle → St. Louis (PD). Seattle traded a fourth-round selection (96th overall) and a 1982 fourth-round selection to St. Louis in exchange for RB Theotis Brown.)
4	97	Los Angeles Rams	Vince Newsome	CB	Washington	from NY Giants (Note: No. 97: NY Giants → LA Rams (PD). The NY Giants traded a fourth-round selection (97th overall) to the LA Rams in exchange for QB Jeff Rutledge.)
4	98	New Orleans Saints	Gary Lewis	DT	Oklahoma State	
4	99	Tampa Bay Buccaneers	Kelly Thomas	T	USC	
4	100	Minnesota Vikings	Mark Rush	RB	Miami (FL)	
4	101	New England Patriots	Johnny Rembert ^{†}	LB	Clemson	
4	102	Atlanta Falcons	John Harper	LB	Southern Illinois	
4	103	St. Louis Cardinals	Lionel Washington	CB	Tulane	
4	104	Green Bay Packers	Mike Miller	WR	Tennessee	
4	105	New York Jets	Wes Howell	TE	California	
4	106	Pittsburgh Steelers	Bo Metcalf	CB	Baylor	
4	107	Chicago Bears	Pat Dunsmore	TE	Drake	from San Diego (Note: No. 107: San Diego → Chicago (PD). San Diego traded fourth- and eighth-round selections (107th and 219th overall) to Chicago in exchange for CB Reuben Henderson.)
4	108	Dallas Cowboys	Chris Faulkner	TE	Florida	
4	109	Cincinnati Bengals	Steve Maidlow	LB	Michigan State	
4	110	Los Angeles Raiders	Greg Townsend ^{†}	DE	TCU	
4	111	Los Angeles Rams	Doug Reed	DT	San Diego State	from Miami (Note: No. 111: Miami → LA Rams (PD). Miami traded a fourth-round selection (111th overall) to the LA Rams in exchange for RB Eddie Hill.)
4	112	Buffalo Bills	Jimmy Payne	DE	Georgia	from Washington via New Orleans (Note: No. 112: Washington → New Orleans → Buffalo. Multiple trades: Washington → New Orleans (PD). Washington traded a fourth-round selection (112th overall) to New Orleans in exchange for 1982 eighth-, ninth-, tenth-, eleventh- and twelfth-round selections. New Orleans → Buffalo (PD). New Orleans traded a fourth-round selection (112th overall) to Buffalo in exchange for a 1984 third-round selection.)
5	113	Baltimore Colts	Sid Abramowitz	T	Tulsa	
5	114	Houston Oilers	Larry Moriarty	RB	Notre Dame	
5	115	Detroit Lions	Demetrious Johnson	S	Missouri	from LA Rams (Note: No. 115: LA Rams → Detroit (D). The LA Rams traded a fifth-round selection (115th overall) to Detroit in exchange for OL Russ Bolinger.)
5	116	Denver Broncos	Weedy Harris	LB	Houston	
5	117	San Francisco 49ers	Riki Ellison	LB	USC	
5	118	New England Patriots	Smiley Creswell	DE	Michigan State	from Chicago (Note: No. 118: Chicago → New England (PD). Chicago traded a fifth-round selection (118th overall) to New England in exchange for LB Rod Shoate.)
5	119	Kansas City Chiefs	Jim Arnold ^{†}	P	Vanderbilt	
5	120	Philadelphia Eagles	Byron Darby	DT	USC	
5	121	Detroit Lions	Steve Mott	C	Alabama	
5	122	Cleveland Browns	Bill Contz	T	Penn State	
5	123	Seattle Seahawks	Chris Castor	WR	Duke	
5	124	New York Giants	Malcolm Scott	TE	LSU	
5	125	Denver Broncos	Bruce Baldwin	DB	Harding	from New Orleans (Note: No. 125: New Orleans → Denver (PD). New Orleans traded a fifth-round selection (125th overall) to Denver in exchange for LB Rob Nairne.)
5	126	Buffalo Bills	Matt Vandenboom	DB	Wisconsin	
5	127	Minnesota Vikings	Mark Stewart	LB	Washington	
5	128	New England Patriots	Darryl Lewis	TE	Texas–Arlington	
5	129	Atlanta Falcons	Brett Miller	T	Iowa	
5	130	St. Louis Cardinals	Steve Bird	WR	Eastern Kentucky	
5	131	Tampa Bay Buccaneers	Tony Chickillo	DT	Miami (FL)	
5	132	Green Bay Packers	Bryan Thomas	RB	Pittsburgh	
5	133	Pittsburgh Steelers	Paul Skansi	WR	Washington	
5	134	Los Angeles Rams	Otis Grant	WR	Michigan State	from San Diego (Note: No. 134: San Diego → LA Rams (PD). San Diego traded a fifth-round selection (134th overall) to the LA Rams in exchange for WR Ron Smith.)
5	135	Dallas Cowboys	Chuck McSwain	RB	Clemson	
5	136	New York Jets	John Walker	DT	Nebraska–Omaha	
5	137	Cincinnati Bengals	Jeff Christensen	QB	Eastern Illinois	
5	138	Los Angeles Raiders	Dokie Williams	WR	UCLA	from LA Raiders via San Francisco (Note: No. 138: LA Raiders → San Francisco → LA Raiders. Multiple trades: LA Raiders → San Francisco (PD). The LA Raiders traded a fifth-round selection (138th overall) and a 1982 sixth-round selection to San Francisco in exchange for DE Cedrick Hardman. San Francisco → LA Raiders (PD). San Francisco traded a fifth-round selection (138th overall) to the LA Raiders in exchange for OT Lindsey Mason.)
5	139	Houston Oilers	Jerome Foster	DT	Ohio State	from Miami (Note: No. 139: Miami → Houston (D). See Round 3: Houston → Miami.)
5	140	Pittsburgh Steelers	Gregg Garrity	WR	Penn State	from Washington (Note: No. 140: Washington → Pittsburgh (PD). Washington traded a fifth-round selection (140th overall) and a 1982 seventh-round selection to Pittsburgh in exchange for QB Mike Kruczek.)
6	141	San Diego Chargers	Trumaine Johnson	WR	Grambling State	from Baltimore (Note: No. 141: Baltimore → San Diego (PD). Baltimore traded a sixth-round selection (141st overall) to San Diego in exchange for LB Mike Wood.)
6	142	Houston Oilers	Steve Haworth	DB	Oklahoma	
6	143	Denver Broncos	Victor Heflin	DB	Delaware State	
6	144	Los Angeles Rams	Gary Kowalski	T	Boston College	
6	145	Cleveland Browns	Tim Stracka	TE	Wisconsin	from Chicago (Note: No. 145: Chicago → Cleveland (PD). Chicago traded a sixth-round selection (145th overall) to Cleveland in exchange for OL Gerry Sullivan.)
6	146	Kansas City Chiefs	Ellis Gardner	T	Georgia Tech	
6	147	Philadelphia Eagles	Victor Oatis	WR	Northwestern State	
6	148	Tampa Bay Buccaneers	Gene Branton	WR	Texas Southern	from San Francisco (Note: No. 148: San Francisco → Tampa Bay (??). San Francisco traded a sixth-round selection (148th overall) to Tampa Bay in exchange for a 1984 fourth-round selection.)
6	149	Cleveland Browns	Dave Puzzuoli	DT	Pittsburgh	
6	150	Seattle Seahawks	Reginald Gipson	RB	Alabama A&m	
6	151	New York Giants	Darrell Patterson	LB	TCU	
6	152	Cincinnati Bengals	Kiki DeAyala	LB	Texas	from New Orleans (Note: No. 152: New Orleans → Cincinnati (PD). New Orleans traded a sixth-round selection (152nd overall) to Cincinnati in exchange for TE Don Bass.)
6	153	New York Giants	Kevin Belcher	G	UTEP	from Buffalo via LA Rams (Note: No. 153: Buffalo → LA Rams → NY Giants. Multiple trades: Buffalo → LA Rams (PD). Buffalo traded a sixth-round selection (153rd overall) to the LA Rams in exchange for DB Bill Simpson. LA Rams → NY Giants (PD). See Round 3: LA Rams → NY Giants.)
6	154	Detroit Lions	Todd Brown	WR	Nebraska	
6	155	New England Patriots	Mike Bass	K	Illinois	
6	156	Atlanta Falcons	Anthony Allen	WR	Washington	
6	157	St. Louis Cardinals	George Schmitt	DB	Delaware	
6	158	Tampa Bay Buccaneers	Ken Kaplan	T	New Hampshire	
6	159	Minnesota Vikings	Mike Jones	WR	Tennessee State	
6	160	Green Bay Packers	Ron Sams	G	Pittsburgh	
6	161	Baltimore Colts	Grant Feasel	C	Abilene Christian	from San Diego (Note: No. 161: San Diego → Baltimore (PD). San Diego traded a sixth-round selection (161st overall) to Baltimore in exchange for S Bruce Laird.)
6	162	Dallas Cowboys	Reggie Collier	QB	Southern Miss	
6	163	New York Jets	Vincent White	RB	Stanford	
6	164	Pittsburgh Steelers	Eric Williams	DB	NC State	
6	165	Cincinnati Bengals	Larry Kinnebrew	RB	Tennessee State	
6	166	Washington Redskins	Bob Winckler	T	Wisconsin	from LA Raiders (Note: No. 166: LA Raiders → Washington (D). The LA Raiders traded a sixth-round selection (166th overall) to Washington in exchange for a 1984 fifth-round selection.)
6	167	Miami Dolphins	Reggie Roby ^{†}	P	Iowa	
6	168	Washington Redskins	Babe Laufenberg	QB	Indiana	
7	169	Baltimore Colts	Alvin Moore	RB	Arizona State	
7	170	Houston Oilers	Herkie Walls	WR	Texas	
7	171	Los Angeles Rams	Jeff Simmons	WR	USC	
7	172	Denver Broncos	Myron Dupree	DB	North Carolina Central	
7	173	Kansas City Chiefs	Ken Thomas	RB	San Jose State	
7	174	Philadelphia Eagles	Anthony Edgar	RB	Hawaii	
7	175	San Francisco 49ers	Gary Moten	LB	SMU	
7	176	Cleveland Browns	Rocky Belk	WR	Miami (FL)	from Chicago (Note: No. 176: Chicago → Cleveland (PD). Chicago traded a seventh-round selection (176th overall) to Cleveland in exchange for LB Bruce Huther.)
7	177	Seattle Seahawks	Sam Merriman	LB	Idaho	
7	178	New York Giants	Perry Williams	CB	NC State	
7	179	Kansas City Chiefs	Daryl Posey	RB	Mississippi College	from New Orleans (Note: No. 179: New Orleans → Kansas City (PD). New Orleans traded a seventh-round selection (179th overall) to Kansas City in exchange for LB Whitney Paul.)
7	180	Buffalo Bills	Gurnest Brown	DT	Maryland	
7	181	Detroit Lions	Mike Black	P	Arizona State University	
7	182	Philadelphia Eagles	Jon Schultheis	G	Princeton	from Cleveland (Note: No. 182: Cleveland → Philadelphia (PD). Cleveland traded a seventh-round selection (182nd overall) to Philadelphia in exchange for DE Thomas Brown.)
7	183	Atlanta Falcons	Jeff Turk	DB	Boise State	
7	184	St. Louis Cardinals	Carlos Scott	C	UTEP	
7	185	Tampa Bay Buccaneers	Weldon Ledbetter	RB	Oklahoma	
7	186	Minnesota Vikings	Carl Lee ^{†}	CB	Marshall	
7	187	New England Patriots	Craig James ^{†}	RB	SMU	
7	188	Green Bay Packers	Jessie Clark	RB	Arkansas	
7	189	Dallas Cowboys	Chris Schultz	T	Arizona	
7	190	New York Jets	Darrin Newbold	LB	Southwest Missouri State	
7	191	Pittsburgh Steelers	Mark Kirchner	G	Baylor	
7	192	San Diego Chargers	Bill Elko	DT	LSU	
7	193	Cincinnati Bengals	James Griffin	DB	Middle Tennessee	
7	194	Los Angeles Raiders	Jeff McCall	RB	Clemson	
7	195	Miami Dolphins	Keith Woetzel	LB	Rutgers	
7	196	Washington Redskins	Kelvin Bryant	RB	North Carolina	
8	197	Denver Broncos	Gary Kubiak	QB	Texas A&M	from Baltimore (Note: No. 197: Baltimore → Denver (PD). Baltimore traded an eighth-round selection (197th overall) to Denver in exchange for OT Glenn Hyde.)
8	198	Houston Oilers	Robert Thompson	LB	Michigan	
8	199	Pittsburgh Steelers	Henry Odom	RB	South Carolina State	from Denver (Note: No. 199: Denver → Pittsburgh (PD). Denver traded an eighth-round selection (199th overall) to Pittsburgh in exchange for DB J. T. Thomas.)
8	200	Los Angeles Rams	Troy West	DB	USC	
8	201	Philadelphia Eagles	Rich Kraynak	LB	Pittsburgh	
8	202	San Diego Chargers	Earnest Jackson	RB	Texas A&m	from San Francisco (Note: No. 202: San Francisco → San Diego (PD). San Francisco traded an eighth-round selection (202nd overall) and a 1985 seventh-round selection to San Diego in exchange for LB Bob Horn.)
8	203	Chicago Bears	Richard Dent^{‡}^{†}	DE	Tennessee State	
8	204	Kansas City Chiefs	Irv Eatman	T	UCLA	
8	205	New York Giants	Andy Headen	LB	Clemson	
8	206	New Orleans Saints	David Greenwood	DB	Wisconsin	
8	207	Buffalo Bills	James Durham	DB	Houston	
8	208	Detroit Lions	Bill Stapleton	DB	Washington	
8	209	Cleveland Browns	Mike McClearn	G	Temple	
8	210	Seattle Seahawks	Matt Hernandez	T	Purdue	
8	211	St. Louis Cardinals	Bob Harris	DB	Auburn	
8	212	Tampa Bay Buccaneers	John Samuelson	LB	Azusa Pacific	
8	213	Minnesota Vikings	Norris Brown	TE	Georgia	
8	214	New England Patriots	Ronnie Lippett	DB	Miami (FL)	
8	215	Atlanta Falcons	John Rade	LB	Boise State	
8	216	Green Bay Packers	Carlton Briscoe	DB	McNeese State	
8	217	New York Jets	Davlin Mullen	DB	Western Kentucky	
8	218	Pittsburgh Steelers	Craig Dunaway	TE	Michigan	
8	219	Chicago Bears	Mark Bortz ^{†}	G	Iowa	from San Diego (Note: No. 219: San Diego → Chicago (PD). See Round 4: San Diego → Chicago.)
8	220	Dallas Cowboys	Lawrence Ricks	RB	Michigan	
8	221	Cincinnati Bengals	Mike Martin	WR	Illinois	
8	222	Los Angeles Raiders	Mike Dotterer	RB	Stanford	
8	223	Miami Dolphins	Mark Clayton ^{†}	WR	Louisville	
8	224	Washington Redskins	Todd Hallstrom	T	Minnesota	
9	225	Baltimore Colts	Jim Mills	T	Hawaii	
9	226	Houston Oilers	Kevin Potter	DB	Missouri	
9	227	Los Angeles Rams	Jack Becher	C	Boston College	
9	228	Denver Broncos	Brian Hawkins	DB	San Jose State	
9	229	San Francisco 49ers	Mike Mularkey	TE	Florida	
9	230	Chicago Bears	Rob Fada	G	Pittsburgh	
9	231	Kansas City Chiefs	Adam Lingner	C	Illinois	
9	232	Philadelphia Eagles	Rich Pelzer	T	Rhode Island	
9	233	New England Patriots	Ricky Williams	RB	Langston	from New Orleans (Note: No. 233: New Orleans → New England (D). New Orleans traded ninth-, tenth-, eleventh- and twelfth-round selections (233rd, 265th, 292nd and 319th overall) to New England in exchange for a 1984 fourth-round selection.)
9	234	Buffalo Bills	George Parker	RB	Norfolk State	
9	–	Detroit Lions	Selection forfeited (Note: Detroit forfeited a ninth-round selection after selecting CB Kevin Robinson in the 1982 supplemental draft.)			
9	235	Chicago Bears	Mark Zavagnin	LB	Notre Dame	from Cleveland via San Francisco (Note: No. 235: Cleveland → San Francisco → Chicago. Multiple trades: Cleveland → San Francisco (PD). Cleveland traded a ninth-round selection (235th overall) to San Francisco in exchange for K Matt Bahr. San Francisco → Chicago (D). San Francisco traded ninth- and twelfth-round selections (235th and 313th overall) to Chicago in exchange for OL Jeff Williams.)
9	236	Seattle Seahawks	Bob Clasby	DT	Notre Dame	
9	237	New York Giants	Ali Haji-Sheikh	K	Michigan	
9	238	Tampa Bay Buccaneers	Hasson Arbubakrr	DT	Texas Tech	
9	239	Minnesota Vikings	Rod Achter	WR	Toledo	
9	240	New England Patriots	Mark Keel	TE	Arizona	
9	241	Baltimore Colts	Chris Rose	T	Stanford	from Atlanta (Note: No. 241: Atlanta → Baltimore (PD). Atlanta traded a ninth-round selection (241st overall) to Baltimore in exchange for P Dave Smigelsky.)
9	242	St. Louis Cardinals	Otis Brown	RB	Jackson State	
9	243	Green Bay Packers	Robin Ham	C	West Texas State	
9	244	Pittsburgh Steelers	Blake Wingle	G	UCLA	
9	245	San Diego Chargers	Mike Green	LB	Oklahoma State	
9	246	Dallas Cowboys	Al Gross	DB	Arizona	
9	247	New York Jets	Bobby Humphery	WR	New Mexico State	
9	248	Cincinnati Bengals	Stanley Wilson	RB	Oklahoma	
9	249	Los Angeles Raiders	Kent Jordan	TE	St. Mary's (CA)	
9	250	Miami Dolphins	Mark Brown	LB	Purdue	
9	251	Washington Redskins	Marcus Gilbert	RB	TCU	
10	252	Baltimore Colts	Ron Hopkins	DB	Murray State	
10	253	Green Bay Packers	Byron Williams	WR	Texas Arlington	from Houston (Note: No. 253: Houston → Green Bay (PD). Houston traded a tenth-round selection (253rd overall) to Green Bay in exchange for OT Mark Koncar.)
10	254	Denver Broncos	Walt Bowyer	DE	Arizona State	
10	255	Minnesota Vikings	Melvin Brown	DB	Ole Miss	from LA Rams (Note: No. 255: LA Rams → Minnesota (PD). The LA Rams traded a tenth-round selection (255th overall) to Minnesota in exchange for OT Ron Yary.)
10	256	Chicago Bears	Anthony Hutchison	RB	Texas Tech	
10	257	Kansas City Chiefs	Mark Shumate	DT	Wisconsin	
10	258	Philadelphia Eagles	Thomas Strauthers	DT	Jackson State	
10	259	San Francisco 49ers	Jeff Merrell	DT	Nebraska	
10	260	Buffalo Bills	Richard Thorpe	DT	Louisville	
10	261	Detroit Lions	Dave Laube	G	Penn State	
10	262	Cleveland Browns	Thomas Hopkins	T	Alabama State	
10	263	Seattle Seahawks	Pete Speros	G	Penn State	
10	264	New England Patriots	James Williams	TE	Wyoming	from NY Giants (Note: No. 264: NY Giants → New England (PD). The NY Giants traded a tenth-round selection (264th overall) to New England in exchange for LB Bill Matthews.)
10	265	New England Patriots	Toby Williams	DE	Nebraska	from New Orleans (Note: No. 265: New Orleans → New England (D). See Round 9: New Orleans → New England.)
10	266	Minnesota Vikings	Walter Tate	C	Tennessee State	
10	267	New England Patriots	Tom Ramsey	QB	UCLA	
10	268	Atlanta Falcons	Ralph Giacomarro	P	Penn State	
10	269	St. Louis Cardinals	Tim Lucas	LB	California	
10	270	Tampa Bay Buccaneers	Darius Durham	WR	San Diego State	
10	271	Green Bay Packers	Jimmy Thomas	DB	Indiana	
10	272	San Diego Chargers	Bruce Mathison	QB	Nebraska	
10	273	Dallas Cowboys	Eric Moran	T	Washington	
10	274	New York Jets	Dan Fike	T	Florida	
10	275	Pittsburgh Steelers	Roosevelt Straughter	DB	Northeast Louisiana	
10	276	Cincinnati Bengals	Tim Krumrie ^{†}	DT	Wisconsin	
10	277	Los Angeles Raiders	Mervyn Fernandez	WR	San Jose State	
10	278	Miami Dolphins	Anthony Reed	RB	South Carolina State	
10	279	Washington Redskins	Geff Gandy	LB	Baylor	
11	280	Baltimore Colts	Jim Bob Taylor	QB	Georgia Tech	
11	281	New York Giants	Lee Jenkins	DB	Tennessee	from Houston (Note: No. 281: Houston → NY Giants (D). Houston traded eleventh- and twelfth-round selections (281st and 309th overall) to the NY Giants in exchange for a 1984 ninth-round selection.)
11	282	Los Angeles Rams	Danny Triplett	LB	Clemson	
11	283	Denver Broncos	Don Bailey	C	Miami (FL)	
11	284	Kansas City Chiefs	Dwayne Jackson	DE	South Carolina State	
11	285	Philadelphia Eagles	Steve Sebahar	C	Washington State	
11	286	Chicago Bears	Gary Worthy	RB	Wilmington (OH)	
11	287	Detroit Lions	Ben Tate	RB	North Carolina Central	
11	288	Cleveland Browns	Boyce Green	RB	Carson–Newman	
11	289	San Francisco 49ers	Jesse Sapolu ^{†}	C	Hawaii	
11	290	Seattle Seahawks	Bob Mayberry	G	Clemson	
11	291	New York Giants	Clenzie Pierson	DT	Rice	
11	292	New England Patriots	Steve Parker	WR	Abilene Christian	from New Orleans (Note: No. 292: New Orleans → New England (D). See Round 9: New Orleans → New England.)
11	293	Buffalo Bills	Larry White	DE	Jackson State	
11	294	New England Patriots	Calvin Eason	DB	Houston	
11	295	Atlanta Falcons	John Salley	DB	Wyoming	
11	296	St. Louis Cardinals	Aaron Williams	WR	Washington	
11	297	Tampa Bay Buccaneers	Mark Witte	TE	North Texas State	
11	298	Minnesota Vikings	Brian Butcher	G	Clemson	
11	299	Green Bay Packers	Bucky Scribner	P	Kansas	
11	300	Dallas Cowboys	Dan Taylor	T	Idaho State	
11	301	New York Jets	Mike Harmon	WR	Ole Miss	
11	302	Pittsburgh Steelers	Mark Raugh	TE	West Virginia	
11	303	San Diego Chargers	Tim Kearse	WR	San Jose State	
11	304	Cincinnati Bengals	Gary Williams	WR	Ohio State	
11	305	Cleveland Browns	Howard McAdoo	LB	Michigan State	from LA Raiders (Note: No. 305: LA Raiders → Cleveland (PD). The LA Raiders traded an eleventh-round selection (305th overall) to Cleveland in exchange for RB Greg Pruitt.)
11	306	Miami Dolphins	Joe Lukens	G	Ohio State	
11	307	San Diego Chargers	Tim Spencer	RB	Ohio State	from Washington (Note: No. 307: Washington → San Diego (PD). Washington traded an eleventh-round selection (307th overall) to San Diego in exchange for TE Greg McCrary.)
12	308	Baltimore Colts	Carl Williams	WR	Texas Southern	
12	309	New York Giants	Robbie Jones	LB	Alabama	from Houston (Note: No. 309: Houston → NY Giants (D). See Round 11: Houston → NY Giants.)
12	310	Denver Broncos	Karl Mecklenburg ^{†}	LB	Minnesota	
12	311	Los Angeles Rams	Clete Casper	QB	Washington State	
12	312	Philadelphia Eagles	David Mangrum	QB	Baylor	
12	313	Chicago Bears	Oliver Williams	WR	Illinois	from San Francisco (Note: No. 313: San Francisco → Chicago (D). See Round 9: San Francisco → Chicago.)
12	314	San Diego Chargers	Billy Blaylock	DB	Tennessee Tech	from Chicago (Note: No. 314: Chicago → San Diego (PD). Chicago traded a twelfth-round selection (314th overall) and a 1984 fifth-round selection to San Diego in exchange for OL Jeff Williams.)
12	315	Kansas City Chiefs	Ken Jones	T	Tennessee	
12	316	Cleveland Browns	Paul Farren	T	Boston University	
12	317	Seattle Seahawks	Don Dow	T	Washington	
12	318	New York Giants	Frank Magwood	WR	Clemson	
12	319	New England Patriots	Waddell Kelly	RB	Arkansas State	from New Orleans (Note: No. 319: New Orleans → New England (D). See Round 9: New Orleans → New England.)
12	320	Buffalo Bills	Julius Dawkins	WR	Pittsburgh	
12	321	Detroit Lions	Jim Lane	C	Idaho State	
12	322	Atlanta Falcons	Allama Matthews	TE	Vanderbilt	
12	323	St. Louis Cardinals (NFL)	James Lane	LB	Alabama State	
12	324	Tampa Bay Buccaneers	John Higginbotham	DT	Northeastern State	
12	325	Minnesota Vikings	Maurice Turner	RB	Utah State	
12	326	New England Patriots	Andy Ekern	T	Missouri	
12	327	Green Bay Packers	John Harvey	LB	USC	
12	328	New York Jets	Stu Crum	K	Tulsa	
12	329	San Diego Chargers	Chuck Ehin	DT	BYU	
12	330	Pittsburgh Steelers	Roger Wiley	RB	Sam Houston State	
12	331	Dallas Cowboys	Lorenzo Bouier	RB	Maine	
12	332	Cincinnati Bengals	Andre Young	LB	Bowling Green	
12	333	Los Angeles Raiders	Scott Lindquist	QB	Northern Arizona	
12	334	Miami Dolphins	Anthony Carter ^{†}	WR	Michigan	
12	335	New York Giants	John Tuggle	RB	California	from Washington (Note: No. 335: Washington → NY Giants (PD). Washington traded a twelfth-round selection (335th overall) to the NY Giants in exchange for LB Kevin Turner.)

== Hall of Fame inductees ==
- Eric Dickerson, running back from Southern Methodist, taken 1st round 2nd overall by Los Angeles Rams

Inducted: Professional Football Hall of Fame Class of 1999.

- Jim Kelly, quarterback from Miami, taken 1st round 14th overall by Buffalo Bills

Inducted: Professional Football Hall of Fame Class of 2002.

- John Elway, quarterback from Stanford, taken 1st round 1st overall by Baltimore Colts

Inducted: Professional Football Hall of Fame Class of 2004.

- Dan Marino, quarterback from Pittsburgh, taken 1st round 27th overall by Miami Dolphins

Inducted: Professional Football Hall of Fame Class of 2005.

- Bruce Matthews, center from Southern California, taken 1st round 9th overall by Houston Oilers

Inducted: Professional Football Hall of Fame Class of 2007.

- Darrell Green, cornerback from Texas A&I, taken 1st round 28th overall by Washington Redskins

Inducted: Professional Football Hall of Fame Class of 2008.

- Richard Dent, defensive end from Tennessee State, taken 8th round 203rd overall by Chicago Bears

Inducted: Professional Football Hall of Fame Class of 2011.

- Jim Covert, offensive tackle from Pittsburgh, taken 1st round 6th overall by Chicago Bears

Inducted: Professional Football Hall of Fame Class of 2020.

- Roger Craig, running back from Nebraska, taken 2nd round 49th overall by San Francisco 49ers

Inducted: Professional Football Hall of Fame Class of 2026.

== Notable undrafted players ==
†	Pro Bowler

Original NFL team	Player	Pos.	College	Notes
Atlanta Falcons	Dan Benish	DT	Clemson	
Atlanta Falcons	Arthur Cox	TE	Texas Southern	
Atlanta Falcons	David Frye	LB	Purdue	
Baltimore Colts	Quinton Ballard	DT	Elon	
Baltimore Colts	John Miller	LB	Mississippi State	
Buffalo Bills	David Kilson	DB	Nevada	
Buffalo Bills	Scott Virkus	DE	Purdue	
Chicago Bears	Brian Glasgow	TE	Northern Illinois	
Chicago Bears	John Janata	T	Illinois	
Chicago Bears	Dennis McKinnon	WR	Florida State	
Cincinnati Bengals	Jim Gustafson	WR	St. Thomas (MN)	
Cleveland Browns	Dale Carver	LB	Georgia	
Cleveland Browns	Andy Gibler	TE	Missouri	
Cleveland Browns	Roger Ruzek	K	Weber State	
Dallas Cowboys	Raúl Allegre	K	Texas	
Dallas Cowboys	Bill Bates ^{†}	S	Tennessee	
Dallas Cowboys	Kirk Phillips	WR	Tulsa	
Dallas Cowboys	Broderick Thompson	T	Kansas	
Dallas Cowboys	Mark Tuinei ^{†}	DT	Hawaii	
Dallas Cowboys	John Warren	P	Tennessee	
Dallas Cowboys	Jon Zogg	G	Boise State	
Denver Broncos	Dan DeRose	LB	CSU Pueblo	
Denver Broncos	Shawn Hollingsworth	T	Angelo State	
Denver Broncos	Mike Morris	LS	Truman State	
Denver Broncos	Rich Stachowski	DT	California	
Detroit Lions	Jeff Chadwick	WR	Grand Valley State	
Green Bay Packers	Frank Mattiace	DT	Holy Cross	
Green Bay Packers	Mike Weddington	LB	Oklahoma	
Houston Oilers	Bob Hamm	DE	Nevada	
Houston Oilers	Brian Sochia ^{†}	DT	Northwestern Oklahoma State	
Kansas City Chiefs	Van Jakes	CB	Kent State	
Kansas City Chiefs	Jim Bob Morris	S	Kansas State	
Kansas City Chiefs	Stephone Paige	WR	Fresno State	
Los Angeles Raiders	Vince Courville	WR	Rice	
Los Angeles Rams	Mike McDonald	LS	USC	
Los Angeles Rams	Scott Tinsley	QB	USC	
Minnesota Vikings	Bill Renner	P	Virginia Tech	
New England Patriots	Ed Reynolds	LB	Virginia	
New England Patriots	Clarence Weathers	WR	Delaware State	
New Orleans Saints	Bobby Hebert ^{†}	QB	Northwestern State	
New York Giants	Bart Oates ^{†}	C	BYU	
New York Giants	Zeke Mowatt	TE	Florida State	
New York Jets	Ted Banker	G	Southeast Missouri State	
New York Jets	Nick Bruckner	WR	Syracuse	
Philadelphia Eagles	Major Everett	FB	Mississippi College	
Philadelphia Eagles	Elbert Foules	CB	Alcorn State	
Pittsburgh Steelers	Lou Rash	DB	Mississippi Valley State	
Pittsburgh Steelers	Pete Rostosky	T	UConn	
St. Louis Cardinals	Fernanza Burgess	WR	Morris Brown	
San Diego Chargers	Gary Plummer	LB	California	
San Diego Chargers	Joaquin Zendejas	K	La Verne	
Seattle Seahawks	Joe Dufek	QB	Yale	
Seattle Seahawks	David Hardy	K	Texas A&M	
Seattle Seahawks	Frank Middleton	RB	Florida A&M	
Seattle Seahawks	Paul Moyer	S	Arizona State	
Seattle Seahawks	John Stadnik	C	Western Illinois	
Tampa Bay Buccaneers	Bob Hewko	QB	Florida	
Tampa Bay Buccaneers	Alan Risher	QB	LSU	
Washington Redskins	D. D. Hoggard	DB	NC State	
Washington Redskins	Kevin Kellin	DT	Minnesota	
Washington Redskins	Nate Newton ^{†}	T	Florida A&M	

== Trades ==
In the explanations below, (D) denotes trades that took place during the 1984 Draft, while (PD) indicates trades completed pre-draft.

Round 1

Round 2

Round 3

Round 4

Round 5

Round 6

Round 7

Round 8

Round 9

Round 10

Round 11

Round 12

== Forfeited picks ==
One selection in the 1983 draft was forfeited:
