= List of Lamar Cardinals head football coaches =

The following is a list of Lamar Cardinals football head coaches and records while at Lamar. This list only includes coaches during the four-year college period.

== Coaches ==
| Tenure | Coach | Seasons | Record | Winning pct. |
|---|---|---|---|---|
| 1951–1952 | Stan Lambert | 2 | 6–13 | .316 |
| 1953–1962 | James B. Higgins | 10 | 59–38–4 | .604 |
| 1963–1975 | Vernon Glass | 13 | 63–68–1 | .562 |
| 1976–1978 | Bob Frederick | 3 | 6-26–1 | .197 |
| 1979–1981 | Larry Kennan | 3 | 13–17–3 | .439 |
| 1982–1985 | Ken Stephens | 4 | 11–33 | .250 |
| 1986–1989 | Ray Alborn | 4 | 13–30 | .302 |
| 2010–2016 | Ray Woodard | 7 | 34–46 | .425 |
| 2017–2019 | Mike Schultz | 3 | 13–19 | .406 |
| 2020–2022 | Blane Morgan | 3 | 5–23 | .179 |
| 2023–present | Peter Rossomando | 3 | 21–15 | .583 |
| Totals | 11 coaches | 55 seasons | 243–331–9 | .425 |

Updated through January 1, 2026
