= Mike Harmon =

Mike Harmon may refer to:

- Mike Harmon (racing driver), NASCAR driver and team owner
- Mike Harmon (politician), Kentucky politician
- Mike Harmon (American football), former football wide receiver for the New York Jets
