= 1982 SMU Mustangs football team =

American college football season

1982 SMU Mustangs football

Co-national champion (HAF) SWC champion Cotton Bowl Classic champion

Cotton Bowl Classic, W 7–3 vs. Pittsburgh
- Conference: Southwest Conference

Ranking
- Coaches: No. 2
- AP: No. 2
- Record: 11–0–1 (7–0–1 SWC)
- Head coach: Bobby Collins (1st season)
- Offensive scheme: No-huddle option
- Defensive coordinator: Bill Clay (1st season)
- Base defense: 3–4
- Captains: Craig James; Gary Moten
- Home stadium: Texas Stadium

1982 Southwest Conference football standings
	Conf.					Overall
Team	W		L		T	W		L		T
No. 2 SMU $	7	–	0	–	1	11	–	0	–	1
No. 17 Texas	7	–	1	–	0	9	–	3	–	0
No. 9 Arkansas	5	–	2	–	1	9	–	2	–	1
Houston	4	–	3	–	1	5	–	5	–	1
Baylor	3	–	4	–	1	4	–	6	–	1
Texas Tech	3	–	5	–	0	4	–	7	–	0
Texas A&M	3	–	5	–	0	5	–	6	–	0
TCU	2	–	6	–	0	3	–	8	–	0
Rice	0	–	8	–	0	0	–	11	–	0
$ – Conference champion; Rankings from AP Poll

The 1982 SMU Mustangs football team represented the Southern Methodist University in the 1982 NCAA Division I-A football season. It was the first year for the team under head coach Bobby Collins and the Mustangs finished undefeated at 11–0–1, and were Southwest Conference champions (7–0–1).

The Mustangs won their first ten games, the last of which came on a miraculous 91-yard kickoff return lateral-play in the final seconds against Texas Tech to preserve the unbeaten and untied season to that point. In the regular season finale the following week, a tie against No. 9 Arkansas caused the voters in both polls to drop SMU from second to fourth, costing the Mustangs the national championship. The tie was attributed in part to a lengthy and highly questionable pass interference call on Arkansas late in the game that allowed SMU to score the game-tying touchdown, a call that announcer Keith Jackson stated on air was a bad call by the officials. Trailing by a point, head coach Collins opted not to go for the two-point conversion and the lead, and they kicked the extra point to knot the score at seventeen with under three minutes remaining. There was no further scoring, as SMU missed a long field goal attempt in the final seconds.

Repeating as SWC champions, the Mustangs earned the automatic bid to the Cotton Bowl on New Year's Day, where they defeated sixth-ranked Pittsburgh 7–3. Played in near-freezing conditions, it was the final college game for the "Pony Express" running back tandem of Eric Dickerson and Craig James, as well as for Pitt quarterback Dan Marino.

After SMU's tie to Arkansas, Penn State moved up to second and then defeated No. 1 Georgia in the Sugar Bowl to secure the top spot in the AP Poll and the Coaches Poll, despite a slightly less impressive final record of 11–1.

The Mustangs were runners-up in the final AP Poll, but the Helms Athletic Foundation, in the final year in which it selected a national college football champion, split the honor between SMU and Penn State. On the season, the Mustangs outscored their opponents by a combined score of 354 to 160.

== Schedule ==
Date	Time	Opponent	Rank	Site	Result	Attendance	Source
September 11		Tulane*	No. 8	Texas Stadium; Irving, TX	W 51–7	33,814	
September 18		at UTEP*	No. 6	Sun Bowl; El Paso, TX	W 31–10	33,509	
September 25		TCU	No. 6	Texas Stadium; Irving, TX (rivalry)	W 16–13	43,321	
October 2	6:30 p.m.	North Texas State*	No. 7	Texas Stadium; Irving, TX (rivalry)	W 38–10	30,118	
October 9		at Baylor	No. 6	Baylor Stadium; Waco, TX	W 22–19	30,000	
October 16		Houston	No. 5	Texas Stadium; Irving, TX (rivalry)	W 20–14	31,817	
October 23		at No. 19 Texas	No. 4	Texas Memorial Stadium; Austin, TX	W 30–17	80,157	
October 30		Texas A&M	No. 4	Texas Stadium; Irving, TX	W 47–9	50,008	
November 6		at Rice	No. 2	Rice Stadium; Houston, TX (rivalry)	W 41–14	25,000	
November 13		at Texas Tech	No. 2	Jones Stadium; Lubbock, TX	W 34–27	45,954	
November 20		No. 9 Arkansas	No. 2	Texas Stadium; Irving, TX	T 17–17	65,101	
January 1, 1983		vs. No. 6 Pittsburgh*	No. 4	Cotton Bowl; Dallas, TX (Cotton Bowl)	W 7–3	60,359	
*Non-conference game; Rankings from AP Poll released prior to the game; All times are in Central time

== Rankings ==
Ranking movements Legend: ██ Increase in ranking ██ Decrease in ranking — = Not ranked
	Week															
Poll	Pre	1	2	3	4	5	6	7	8	9	10	11	12	13	14	Final
AP	6	8	6	6	7	6	5	4	4	2	2	2	4	4	4	2
Coaches	11	—	6	8	7	6	5	4	4	3	2	2	4	4	4	2

== Game summaries ==
=== Tulane ===
Tulane Green Wave at No. 8 SMU Mustangs – Game summary

Quarter	1	2	3	4	Total
Green Wave	0	0	0	7	7
No. 8 Mustangs	7	17	7	20	51

at Texas Stadium • Irving, Texas

- Date: September 11
- Game time: 7:12 p.m. CDT
- Game weather: 92 °F (33 °C)
- Game attendance: 33,814
- TV: Superstation WTBS

Scoring summary

Quarter	Time	Drive			Team	Scoring information	Score	
Quarter	Time	Plays	Yards	TOP	Team	Scoring information	Tulane	SMU
1					SMU	Craig James 42-yard touchdown run, Jeff Harrell kick good	0	7
2	13:58				SMU	Eric Dickerson 14-yard touchdown run, Jeff Harrell kick good	0	14
2					SMU	Lance McIlhenny 8-yard touchdown run, Jeff Harrell kick good	0	21
2					SMU	33-yard field goal by Jeff Harrell	0	24
3	5:15				SMU	Eric Dickerson 25-yard touchdown run, Jeff Harrell kick good	0	31
4					SMU	Reggie Dupard 3-yard touchdown run, Jeff Harrell kick good	0	38
4	7:54				Tulane	Elton Veals 1-yard touchdown run, Tony Wood kick good	7	38
4					SMU	Reggie Dupard 46-yard touchdown run, Jeff Harrell kick no good	7	44
4		—	—	—	SMU	Interception returned 7 yards for touchdown by Jackie Wilson, Jeff Harrell kick good	7	51
"TOP" = time of possession. For other American football terms, see Glossary of American football.							7	51

Statistics	Tulane	SMU
First downs		
Total yards		
Rushing yards		
Passing yards		
Turnovers		
Time of possession		

Team	Category	Player	Statistics
Tulane	Passing		
Tulane	Rushing		
Tulane	Receiving		
SMU	Passing		
SMU	Rushing		
SMU	Receiving		

SMU romped to a season-opening victory over Tulane with a school-record 519 yards rushing. Senior Eric Dickerson ran for 183 yards and two touchdowns, and went over 3,000 career rushing yards. Craig James added 110 yards and a touchdown. It was the 10th time Dickerson and James each ran for more than 100 yards in the same game.

=== At UTEP ===
No. 6 SMU Mustangs at UTEP Miners – Game summary

Quarter	1	2	3	4	Total
No. 6 Mustangs	14	14	3	0	31
Miners	0	7	3	0	10

at Sun Bowl • El Paso, Texas

- Date: September 18
- Game time: 6:40 p.m. CDT
- Game attendance: 33,509

Scoring summary

Quarter	Time	Drive			Team	Scoring information	Score	
Quarter	Time	Plays	Yards	TOP	Team	Scoring information	SMU	UTEP
"TOP" = time of possession. For other American football terms, see Glossary of American football.							31	10

Statistics	SMU	UTEP
First downs		
Total yards		
Rushing yards		
Passing yards		
Turnovers		
Time of possession		

Team	Category	Player	Statistics
SMU	Passing		
SMU	Rushing		
SMU	Receiving		
UTEP	Passing		
UTEP	Rushing		
UTEP	Receiving		

=== TCU ===
TCU Horned Frogs at No. 6 SMU Mustangs – Game summary

Quarter	1	2	3	4	Total
Horned Frogs	0	3	10	0	13
No. 6 Mustangs	0	6	0	10	16

at Texas Stadium • Irving, Texas

- Date: September 25
- Game time: 7:00 p.m. CDT
- Game attendance: 43,321

Scoring summary

Quarter	Time	Drive			Team	Scoring information	Score	
Quarter	Time	Plays	Yards	TOP	Team	Scoring information	TCU	SMU
"TOP" = time of possession. For other American football terms, see Glossary of American football.							13	16

Statistics	TCU	SMU
First downs		
Total yards		
Rushing yards		
Passing yards		
Turnovers		
Time of possession		

Team	Category	Player	Statistics
TCU	Passing		
TCU	Rushing		
TCU	Receiving		
SMU	Passing		
SMU	Rushing		
SMU	Receiving		

In the Battle for the Iron Skillet, SMU beat TCU 16–13.

=== North Texas State ===
North Texas State Mean Green at No. 7 SMU Mustangs – Game summary

Quarter	1	2	3	4	Total
Mean Green	0	7	3	0	10
No. 7 Mustangs	14	10	7	7	38

at Texas Stadium • Irving, Texas

- Date: October 2
- Game time: 7:00 p.m. CDT
- Game attendance: 30,118

Scoring summary

Quarter	Time	Drive			Team	Scoring information	Score	
Quarter	Time	Plays	Yards	TOP	Team	Scoring information	North Texas State	SMU
"TOP" = time of possession. For other American football terms, see Glossary of American football.							10	38

Statistics	North Texas State	SMU
First downs		
Total yards		
Rushing yards		
Passing yards		
Turnovers		
Time of possession		

Team	Category	Player	Statistics
North Texas State	Passing		
North Texas State	Rushing		
North Texas State	Receiving		
SMU	Passing		
SMU	Rushing		
SMU	Receiving		

=== At Baylor ===
No. 6 SMU Mustangs at Baylor Bears – Game summary

Quarter	1	2	3	4	Total
No. 6 Mustangs	0	0	14	8	22
Bears	7	6	0	6	19

at Baylor Stadium • Waco, Texas

- Date: October 9
- Game time: 7:00 p.m. CDT
- Game attendance: 30,000

Scoring summary

Quarter	Time	Drive			Team	Scoring information	Score	
Quarter	Time	Plays	Yards	TOP	Team	Scoring information	SMU	Baylor
"TOP" = time of possession. For other American football terms, see Glossary of American football.							22	19

Statistics	SMU	Baylor
First downs		
Total yards		
Rushing yards		
Passing yards		
Turnovers		
Time of possession		

Team	Category	Player	Statistics
SMU	Passing		
SMU	Rushing		
SMU	Receiving		
Baylor	Passing		
Baylor	Rushing		
Baylor	Receiving		

=== Houston ===
Houston Cougars at No. 5 SMU Mustangs – Game summary

Quarter	1	2	3	4	Total
Cougars	0	7	0	7	14
No. 5 Mustangs	7	3	7	3	20

at Texas Stadium • Irving, Texas

- Date: October 16
- Game time: 7:00 p.m. CST
- Game attendance: 31,817
- TV: USA

Scoring summary

Quarter	Time	Drive			Team	Scoring information	Score	
Quarter	Time	Plays	Yards	TOP	Team	Scoring information	Houston	SMU
"TOP" = time of possession. For other American football terms, see Glossary of American football.							14	20

Statistics	Houston	SMU
First downs		
Total yards		
Rushing yards		
Passing yards		
Turnovers		
Time of possession		

Team	Category	Player	Statistics
Houston	Passing		
Houston	Rushing		
Houston	Receiving		
SMU	Passing		
SMU	Rushing		
SMU	Receiving		

=== At Texas ===
No. 4 SMU Mustangs at No. 19 Texas Longhorns – Game summary

Quarter	1	2	3	4	Total
No. 4 Mustangs	0	7	3	20	30
No. 19 Longhorns	0	0	0	17	17

at Texas Memorial Stadium • Austin, Texas

- Date: October 23
- Game time: 2:50 p.m. CDT
- Game attendance: 80,157
- TV announcers (ABC): Keith Jackson (play–by–play), Frank Broyles (color commentator) and Tim Brant (sideline reporter)

Scoring summary

Quarter	Time	Drive			Team	Scoring information	Score	
Quarter	Time	Plays	Yards	TOP	Team	Scoring information	SMU	Texas
"TOP" = time of possession. For other American football terms, see Glossary of American football.							30	17

Statistics	SMU	Texas
First downs		
Total yards		
Rushing yards		
Passing yards		
Turnovers		
Time of possession		

Team	Category	Player	Statistics
SMU	Passing		
SMU	Rushing		
SMU	Receiving		
Texas	Passing		
Texas	Rushing		
Texas	Receiving		

=== Texas A&M ===
Texas A&M Aggies at No. 4 SMU Mustangs – Game summary

Quarter	1	2	3	4	Total
Aggies	0	0	3	6	9
No. 4 Mustangs	16	10	14	7	47

at Texas Stadium • Irving, Texas

- Date: October 30
- Game time: 11:30 a.m. CST
- Game attendance: 50,008
- Referee: Wendell Shelton
- TV announcers (CBS): Verne Lundquist (play–by–play) and Steve Davis (color commentator)

Scoring summary

Quarter	Time	Drive			Team	Scoring information	Score	
Quarter	Time	Plays	Yards	TOP	Team	Scoring information	Texas A&M	SMU
"TOP" = time of possession. For other American football terms, see Glossary of American football.							9	47

Statistics	Texas A&M	SMU
First downs		
Total yards		
Rushing yards		
Passing yards		
Turnovers		
Time of possession		

Team	Category	Player	Statistics
Texas A&M	Passing		
Texas A&M	Rushing		
Texas A&M	Receiving		
SMU	Passing		
SMU	Rushing		
SMU	Receiving		

Eric Dickerson ran for over 200 yards and 3 touchdowns on 14 carries.

=== At Rice ===
No. 2 SMU Mustangs at Rice Owls – Game summary

Quarter	1	2	3	4	Total
No. 2 Mustangs	0	20	7	14	41
Owls	0	0	14	0	14

at Rice Stadium • Houston, Texas

- Date: November 6
- Game time: 2:00 p.m. CST
- Game attendance: 25,000

Scoring summary

Quarter	Time	Drive			Team	Scoring information	Score	
Quarter	Time	Plays	Yards	TOP	Team	Scoring information	SMU	Rice
"TOP" = time of possession. For other American football terms, see Glossary of American football.							41	14

Statistics	SMU	Rice
First downs		
Total yards		
Rushing yards		
Passing yards		
Turnovers		
Time of possession		

Team	Category	Player	Statistics
SMU	Passing		
SMU	Rushing		
SMU	Receiving		
Rice	Passing		
Rice	Rushing		
Rice	Receiving		

In the Mayor's Cup, SMU beat Rice 41–14.

=== Arkansas ===
No. 9 Arkansas Razorbacks at No. 2 SMU Mustangs – Game summary

Quarter	1	2	3	4	Total
No. 9 Razorbacks	7	0	3	7	17
No. 2 Mustangs	0	7	3	7	17

at Texas Stadium • Irving, Texas

- Date: November 20
- Game time: 2:50 p.m. CST
- Game attendance: 65,101
- TV announcers (ABC): Keith Jackson (play–by–play), Lee Grosscup (color commentator) and Tim Brant (sideline reporter)

Scoring summary

Quarter	Time	Drive			Team	Scoring information	Score	
Quarter	Time	Plays	Yards	TOP	Team	Scoring information	Arkansas	SMU
1					Arkansas	Gary Anderson 3-yard touchdown run, Martin Smith kick good	7	0
2					SMU	Eric Dickerson 6-yard touchdown run, Jeff Harrell kick good	7	7
3					SMU	49-yard field goal by Jeff Harrell	7	10
3					Arkansas	27-yard field goal by Martin Smith	10	10
4					Arkansas	Gary Anderson 3-yard touchdown run, Martin Smith kick good	17	10
4					SMU	Lance McIlhenny 7-yard touchdown run, Jeff Harrell kick good	17	17
"TOP" = time of possession. For other American football terms, see Glossary of American football.							17	17

Going into this game, SMU needed a victory or a tie to claim the SWC championship and secure a trip to the Cotton Bowl. Arkansas, on the other hand, needed a victory over the Mustangs plus a win over Texas the following week. The game proved to be marred by controversy due to questionable officiating.

Late in the fourth quarter Arkansas led SMU 17-10 with time winding down. From the Mustang 43 yard line, SMU quarterback Lance McIlhenny lofted a pass to receiver Jackie Wilson down the left sideline, with Wilson being defended by Arkansas cornerback Nathan Jones. The pass was long, and Jones was in fact in front of Wilson as both players went to the turf together. Jones was flagged for pass interference, and since that penalty was a spot foul instead of 15 yards at that time in college football, the ball was placed near the Arkansas 15 yard line. SMU would score the game-tying touchdown a few plays later, and the game ended in a 17-17 tie, handing the Mustangs the conference championship. Play-by-play announcer Keith Jackson would even say on live television that the pass interference penalty on Jones was "just a terrible call". The officiating crew was suspended after this game and the NCAA issued an apology to Arkansas. This egregious call directly influenced the NCAA to change the rules for pass interference over the following summer so that a pass interference penalty would be 15 yards and not a spot foul.

Statistics	Arkansas	SMU
First downs		
Total yards		
Rushing yards		
Passing yards		
Turnovers		
Time of possession		

Team	Category	Player	Statistics
Arkansas	Passing		
Arkansas	Rushing		
Arkansas	Receiving		
SMU	Passing		
SMU	Rushing		
SMU	Receiving		

=== Vs. Pittsburgh (Cotton Bowl) ===
No. 6 Pittsburgh Panthers vs. No. 4 SMU Mustangs (Cotton Bowl) – Game summary

Quarter	1	2	3	4	Total
No. 6 Panthers	0	0	3	0	3
No. 4 Mustangs	0	0	7	0	7

at Cotton Bowl • Dallas, Texas

- Date: January 1
- Game time: 12:30 p.m. CST
- Game attendance: 60,359
- Referee: Jimmy Harper
- TV announcers (CBS): Lindsey Nelson (play–by–play), Pat Haden (color commentator), and Pat O'Brien (sideline reporter)

Scoring summary

Quarter	Time	Drive			Team	Scoring information	Score	
Quarter	Time	Plays	Yards	TOP	Team	Scoring information	Pittsburgh	SMU
3					Pittsburgh	43-yard field goal by Eric Schubert	3	0
3					SMU	Lance McIlhenny 9-yard touchdown run, Jeff Harrell kick good	3	7
"TOP" = time of possession. For other American football terms, see Glossary of American football.							3	7

Statistics	Pittsburgh	SMU
First downs		
Total yards		
Rushing yards		
Passing yards		
Turnovers		
Time of possession		

Team	Category	Player	Statistics
Pittsburgh	Passing		
Pittsburgh	Rushing		
Pittsburgh	Receiving		
SMU	Passing		
SMU	Rushing		
SMU	Receiving		

== Roster ==
1982 SMU Mustangs football team roster
Players
Coaches
Offense

Pos.	#	Name	Class
TE	87	Rickey Bolden	Jr
OL	67	Andrew Campbell
QB		Jeff Courtwright	Sr
RB	36	Mark Crites	Jr
RB	19	Eric Dickerson	Sr
FB	28	Charles Drayton (injured)	Sr
RB	21	Reggie Dupard	Fr
OT	70	Dale Hellestrae	So
RB	32	Craig James	Sr
QB	2	Don King	Fr
WR	7	Bobby Leach	So
QB	11	Lance McIlhenny	Jr

Defense

Pos.	#	Name	Class
DB	13	Keith Brooks	Fr
DT	74	Michael Carter	So
DB	29	Russell Carter	Jr
DB	46	Wes Hopkins	Sr
CB	1	Rod Jones	Fr
LB	91	Clarence McDade	Jr
CB	5	Reggie Phillips	So
DB	23	Blane Smith	Sr
DT	78	Richard Neely	Sr
OLB	54	Tony Good	Jr

Special teams

Pos.	#	Name	Class
K	3	Jeff Harrell	Jr
P	32	Craig James	Sr

Head coach

- Bobby Collins

Coordinators/assistant coaches

Legend

- (C) Team captain
- (S) Suspended
- (I) Ineligible
- Injured
- Redshirt

== Awards and honors ==
- Eric Dickerson, consensus All-American, third in the Heisman Trophy voting, despite splitting time with Craig James.

== NFL draft ==
Six Mustangs were selected in the 1983 NFL draft, which lasted 12 rounds (335 selections).

Player	Position	Round	Pick	NFL team
Eric Dickerson	Running back	1	2	Los Angeles Rams
Russell Carter	Safety	1	10	New York Jets
Wes Hopkins	Safety	2	35	Philadelphia Eagles
Gary Moten	Linebacker	7	175	San Francisco 49ers
Craig James	Running back	7	187	New England Patriots
