= Janata (surname) =

Janata (Czech and Slovak feminine: Janatová) is a surname. Notable people with the surname include:

- John Janata (born 1961), American football player
- Kateřina Janatová (born 1997), Czech cross-country skier
