= 1982 Lamar Cardinals football team =

American college football season

1982 Lamar Cardinals football
- Conference: Southland Conference
- Record: 4–7 (1–4 Southland)
- Head coach: Ken Stephens (1st season)
- Home stadium: Cardinal Stadium

1982 Southland Conference football standings
	Conf.					Overall
Team	W		L		T	W		L		T
No. 2 Louisiana Tech $^	5	–	0	–	0	10	–	3	–	0
No. 12 Northeast Louisiana	4	–	1	–	0	8	–	3	–	0
Arkansas State	2	–	3	–	0	5	–	6	–	0
McNeese State	2	–	3	–	0	4	–	6	–	1
Lamar	1	–	4	–	0	4	–	7	–	0
UT Arlington	1	–	4	–	0	3	–	8	–	0
$ – Conference champion; ^ – NCAA Division I-AA playoff participant; Rankings from NCAA Division I-AA Football Committee poll

The 1982 Lamar Cardinals football team represented Lamar University in the 1982 NCAA Division I-AA football season as a member of the Southland Conference. The Cardinals played their home games at Cardinal Stadium now named Provost Umphrey Stadium in Beaumont, Texas. Lamar finished the 1982 season with a 4–7 overall record and a 1–4 conference record. The 1982 had a couple of firsts for the program. 1982 was the first season for the Cardinals to play at the NCAA Division I-AA level. The 1982 season was also the first season with new head coach Ken Stephens.

== Schedule ==
Date	Opponent	Site	Result	Attendance	Source
September 4	at Southwest Texas State*	Bobcat Stadium; San Marcos, TX	L 0–30	11,000	
September 11	at Stephen F. Austin*	Homer Bryce Stadium; Nacogdoches, TX	W 24–14	7,418	
September 18	Sam Houston State*	Cardinal Stadium; Beaumont, TX	W 27–7	11,882	
September 25	Houston*	Houston Astrodome; Houston, TX	L 3–48	26,500	
October 2	Texas Southern*	Cardinal Stadium; Beaumont, TX	W 28–17	13,330	
October 16	No. 5 Louisiana Tech	Joe Aillet Stadium; Ruston, LA	L 13–40	14,800	
October 23	at Southwestern Louisiana*	Cajun Field; Lafayette, LA (rivalry)	L 0–24	19,023	
October 30	No. 5 Northeast Louisiana*	Cardinal Stadium; Beaumont, TX	L 0–14	8,106	
November 6	Arkansas State	Cardinal Stadium; Beaumont, TX	L 19–20	3,054	
November 13	at McNeese State	Cowboy Stadium; Lake Charles, LA (rivalry)	W 12–3	18,321	
November 20	UT Arlington	Cardinal Stadium; Beaumont, TX	L 24–31	2,910	
*Non-conference game; Rankings from NCAA Division I-AA Football Committee Poll released prior to the game
