= 1982 Texas A&M Aggies football team =

American college football season

1982 Texas A&M Aggies football
- Conference: Southwest Conference
- Record: 5–6 (3–5 SWC)
- Head coach: Jackie Sherrill (1st season)
- Offensive coordinator: Pat Ruel (1st season)
- Offensive scheme: Pro set
- Defensive coordinator: R. C. Slocum (3rd season)
- Base defense: 3–4
- Home stadium: Kyle Field

1982 Southwest Conference football standings
| | Conf. | | | | | Overall |
| Team | W | | L | | T | W | | L | | T |
|---|---|---|---|---|---|---|---|---|---|---|
| No. 2 SMU $ | 7 | – | 0 | – | 1 | 11 | – | 0 | – | 1 |
| No. 17 Texas | 7 | – | 1 | – | 0 | 9 | – | 3 | – | 0 |
| No. 9 Arkansas | 5 | – | 2 | – | 1 | 9 | – | 2 | – | 1 |
| Houston | 4 | – | 3 | – | 1 | 5 | – | 5 | – | 1 |
| Baylor | 3 | – | 4 | – | 1 | 4 | – | 6 | – | 1 |
| Texas Tech | 3 | – | 5 | – | 0 | 4 | – | 7 | – | 0 |
| Texas A&M | 3 | – | 5 | – | 0 | 5 | – | 6 | – | 0 |
| TCU | 2 | – | 6 | – | 0 | 3 | – | 8 | – | 0 |
| Rice | 0 | – | 8 | – | 0 | 0 | – | 11 | – | 0 |
$ – Conference champion; Rankings from AP Poll

The 1982 Texas A&M Aggies football team represented Texas A&M University in the 1982 NCAA Division I-A football season as a member of the Southwest Conference (SWC). The Aggies were led by head coach Jackie Sherrill in his first season and finished with a record of five wins and six losses (5–6 overall, 3–5 in the SWC).

== Schedule ==
| Date | Opponent | Site | TV | Result | Attendance | Source |
|---|---|---|---|---|---|---|
| September 4 | Boston College* | Kyle Field; College Station, TX | | L 16–38 | 55,177 | |
| September 18 | UT Arlington* | Kyle Field; College Station, TX | | W 61–22 | 54,098 | |
| September 25 | Louisiana Tech* | Kyle Field; College Station, TX | | W 38–27 | 53,214 | |
| October 2 | Texas Tech | Kyle Field; College Station, TX (rivalry) | CBS | L 15–24 | 59,416 | |
| October 9 | at Houston | Houston Astrodome; Houston, TX | | L 20–24 | 46,302 | |
| October 16 | Baylor | Kyle Field; College Station, TX (rivalry) | | W 28–23 | 64,017 | |
| October 23 | Rice | Kyle Field; College Station, TX | | W 49–7 | 53,767 | |
| October 30 | at No. 4 SMU | Texas Stadium; Irving, TX | | L 9–47 | 50,008 | |
| November 13 | at No. 10 Arkansas | War Memorial Stadium; Little Rock, AR (rivalry) | | L 0–35 | 53,410 | |
| November 20 | TCU | Kyle Field; College Station, TX (rivalry) | | W 34–14 | 51,892 | |
| November 25 | at No. 14 Texas | Texas Memorial Stadium; Austin, TX (rivalry) | | L 16–53 | 72,368 | |
*Non-conference game; Rankings from AP Poll released prior to the game

== Preseason ==
Michigan head coach Bo Schembechler turned down a 10-year, three million dollar offer to become the Texas A&M head coach in January.

== Roster ==
1982 Texas A&M Aggies football team roster
Players
Coaches
Offense

| Pos. | # | Name | Class |
|---|---|---|---|
| QB | 9 | Gary Kubiak | Sr |
| RB | 37 | Johnny Hector | Sr |
| RB | | Earnest Jackson | Sr |
| RB | | Thomas Sanders | So |
| WR | | Jimmy Teal | So |

Defense

| Pos. | # | Name | Class |
|---|---|---|---|
| DL | 22 | Billy Cannon Jr. | Jr |
| DL | 53 | Ray Childress | So |
| LB | | Jeff Fuller | Jr |

Special teams

| Pos. | # | Name | Class |
|---|---|---|---|
| K | 3 | David Hardy | Sr |
| P | | Kyle Stuard |

Head coach

- Jackie Sherrill

Coordinators/assistant coaches

- Curley Hallman (DB)

Legend

- (C) Team captain
- (S) Suspended
- (I) Ineligible
- Injured
- Redshirt
