= Hubert Boales =

American football, baseball, and golf coach

Biographical details
- Born: August 10, 1931 (age 95); Florence, Texas, U.S.

Playing career

Baseball
- 1953–1955: Sam Houston State
- Position: Pitcher

Coaching career (HC unless noted)

Football
- 1956–1962: Jasper HS (TX) (assistant)
- 1963–1966: Jasper HS (TX)
- 1967–1978: McNeese State (assistant)
- 1979–1981: McNeese State (DC)
- 1982: McNeese State

Basketball
- c. 1960: Jasper HS (TX)

Baseball
- c. 1960: Jasper HS (TX)
- 1968–1977: McNeese State

Golf
- 1978–1981: McNeese State
- 1989–1993: McNeese State

Head coaching record
- Overall: 4–6–1 (college football); 190–197–4 (college baseball); 10–28–2 (high school football); 100–35 (high school baseball)

Hubert Edwin Boales Jr. (born August 10, 1931) is an American former football, baseball, and golf coach. He served as the head football coach at the McNeese State University in 1982, compiling a record of 4–6–1. Boales was also the head baseball coach at McNeese State from 1968 to 1977 and the school's head golf coach from 1978 to 1981 and again from 1989 to 1993.

Boales was born in Florence, Texas and attended Sam Houston State Teachers College—now known as Sam Houston State University—where he played college baseball as a pitcher from 1953 to 1955. Before coming to McNeese State in 1967 as assistant football and head baseball coach, Boales coached football, basketball, and baseball at Jasper High School in Jasper, Texas.

== Head coaching record ==
=== College football ===
Year	Team	Overall	Conference	Standing	Bowl/playoffs
McNeese State Cowboys (Southland Conference) (1982)
1982	McNeese State	4–6–1	2–3	T–3rd	
McNeese State:		4–6–1	2–3		
Total:		4–6–1			

=== High school ===
Year	Team	Overall	Conference	Standing	Bowl/playoffs
Jasper Bulldogs () (1963–1966)
1963	Jasper	0–10			
1964	Jasper	1–8–1			
1965	Jasper	2–7–1			
1966	Jasper	7–3			
Jasper:		10–28–2			
Total:		10–28–2			
