= 1982 Arkansas Razorbacks football team =

American college football season

1982 Arkansas Razorbacks football

Astro-Bluebonnet Bowl champion

Astro-Bluebonnet Bowl, W 28–24 vs. Florida
- Conference: Southwest Conference

Ranking
- Coaches: No. 8
- AP: No. 9
- Record: 9–2–1 (5–2–1 SWC)
- Head coach: Lou Holtz (6th season)
- Captains: Gary Anderson; Jessie Clark; Richard Richardson; Billy Ray Smith Jr.
- Home stadium: Razorback Stadium; War Memorial Stadium

1982 Southwest Conference football standings
	Conf.					Overall
Team	W		L		T	W		L		T
No. 2 SMU $	7	–	0	–	1	11	–	0	–	1
No. 17 Texas	7	–	1	–	0	9	–	3	–	0
No. 9 Arkansas	5	–	2	–	1	9	–	2	–	1
Houston	4	–	3	–	1	5	–	5	–	1
Baylor	3	–	4	–	1	4	–	6	–	1
Texas Tech	3	–	5	–	0	4	–	7	–	0
Texas A&M	3	–	5	–	0	5	–	6	–	0
TCU	2	–	6	–	0	3	–	8	–	0
Rice	0	–	8	–	0	0	–	11	–	0
$ – Conference champion; Rankings from AP Poll

The 1982 Arkansas Razorbacks football team represented the University of Arkansas during the 1982 NCAA Division I-A football season. Arkansas had two consensus All-Americans in 1982, Steve Korte, on the offensive line, and defensive lineman Billy Ray Smith. Smith anchored a defensive unit that was the number one scoring offense, giving up only 10.5 points per game, and ninth in the nation in terms of stopping the run, only giving up 96.7 yards per game. Billy Ray Smith was a consensus All American in 1981 as well, and would be picked fifth in the 1983 NFL draft.

== Schedule ==
Date	Time	Opponent	Rank	Site	TV	Result	Attendance	Source
September 11		Tulsa*	No. 13	Razorback Stadium; Fayetteville, AR		W 38–0	43,820	
September 18	7:02 p.m.	Navy*	No. 9	War Memorial Stadium; Little Rock, AR		W 29–17	54,706	
September 25		Ole Miss*	No. 9	War Memorial Stadium; Little Rock, AR		W 14–12	54,980	
October 2		TCU	No. 10	War Memorial Stadium; Little Rock, AR	TBS	W 35–0	54,808	
October 9		Texas Tech	No. 9	Razorback Stadium; Fayetteville, AR (rivalry)		W 21–3	44,024	
October 23		at Houston	No. 6	Houston Astrodome; Houston, TX	CBS	W 38–3	37,503	
October 30		Rice	No. 5	Razorback Stadium; Fayetteville, AR		W 24–6	44,620	
November 6		at Baylor	No. 5	Baylor Stadium; Waco, TX		L 17–24	42,000	
November 13		Texas A&M	No. 10	War Memorial Stadium; Little Rock, AR (rivalry)		W 35–0	53,410	
November 20		at No. 2 SMU	No. 9	Texas Stadium; Irving, TX	ABC	T 17–17	65,101	
December 4		at No. 12 Texas	No. 6	Texas Memorial Stadium; Austin, TX (rivalry)	ABC	L 7–33	67,903	
December 31, 1982		vs. Florida*	No. 14	Houston Astrodome; Houston, TX (Astro-Bluebonnet Bowl)	Mizlou	W 28–24	31,557	
*Non-conference game; Rankings from AP Poll released prior to the game; All times are in Central time

== Rankings ==
Ranking movements Legend: ██ Increase in ranking ██ Decrease in ranking
	Week															
Poll	Pre	1	2	3	4	5	6	7	8	9	10	11	12	13	14	Final
AP	13	13	9	9	10	9	7	6	5	5	10	9	9	6	14	9
Coaches Poll	12		10	9	11	9	7	6	5	4	9	8	7	6	12	8

== Game summaries ==
Going into this game, SMU needed a victory or a tie to claim the SWC championship and secure a trip to the Cotton Bowl. Arkansas, on the other hand, needed a victory over the Mustangs plus a win over Texas the following week. The game proved to be marred by controversy due to questionable officiating.

Late in the fourth quarter Arkansas led SMU 17-10 with time winding down. From the Mustang 43 yard line, SMU quarterback Lance McIlhenny lofted a pass to receiver Jackie Wilson down the left sideline, with Wilson being defended by Arkansas cornerback Nathan Jones. The pass was long, and Jones was in fact in front of Wilson as both players went to the turf together. Jones was flagged for pass interference, and since that penalty was a spot foul instead of 15 yards at that time in college football, the ball was placed near the Arkansas 15 yard line. SMU would score the game-tying touchdown a few plays later, and the game ended in a 17-17 tie, handing the Mustangs the conference championship. Play-by-play announcer Keith Jackson would even say on live television that the pass interference penalty on Jones was "just a terrible call". The officiating crew was suspended after this game and the NCAA issued an apology to Arkansas. This egregious call directly influenced the NCAA to change the rules for pass interference in 1984 so that a pass interference penalty would be a maximum of 15 yards (interference less than 15 yards from the line of scrimmage would still be penalized at the spot of the foul).

=== At SMU ===
#9 Arkansas vs. #2 SMU

Team	1	2	3	4	Total
Razorbacks	7	0	3	7	17
Mustangs	0	7	3	7	17

- Date: November 20
- Location: Texas Stadium, Irving, TX
- Game attendance: 65,101
- TV announcers (ABC): Keith Jackson, Lee Grosscup

Scoring summary
1	Ark	Gary Anderson 3-yard run (Smith kick)	Ark 7–0
2	SMU	Eric Dickerson 6-yard run (Harrell kick)	Tied 7–7
3	SMU	Jeff Harrell 49-yard field goal	SMU 10–7
3	Ark	Martin Smith 27-yard field goal	Tied 10–10
4	Ark	Gary Anderson 3-yard run (Smith kick)	Ark 17–10
4	SMU	Lance McIlhenny 7-yard run (Harrell kick)	Tied 17–17

== Roster ==
- QB Brad Taylor
