= 1982 Baylor Bears football team =

American college football season

1982 Baylor Bears football
- Conference: Southwest Conference
- Record: 4–6–1 (3–4–1 SWC)
- Head coach: Grant Teaff (11th season)
- Offensive coordinator: John O'Hara (4th season)
- Co-offensive coordinator: Duke Christian (4th season)
- Offensive scheme: I formation
- Home stadium: Baylor Stadium

1982 Southwest Conference football standings
	Conf.					Overall
Team	W		L		T	W		L		T
No. 2 SMU $	7	–	0	–	1	11	–	0	–	1
No. 17 Texas	7	–	1	–	0	9	–	3	–	0
No. 9 Arkansas	5	–	2	–	1	9	–	2	–	1
Houston	4	–	3	–	1	5	–	5	–	1
Baylor	3	–	4	–	1	4	–	6	–	1
Texas Tech	3	–	5	–	0	4	–	7	–	0
Texas A&M	3	–	5	–	0	5	–	6	–	0
TCU	2	–	6	–	0	3	–	8	–	0
Rice	0	–	8	–	0	0	–	11	–	0
$ – Conference champion; Rankings from AP Poll

The 1982 Baylor Bears football team represented Baylor University as a member of the Southwest Conference (SWC) during the 1982 NCAA Division I-A football season. Led by 11th-year head coach Grant Teaff, the Bears compiled an overall record of 4–6–1 with a mark of 3–4–1 in conference play, placing fifth the SWC. The team played home games at Baylor Stadium in Waco, Texas.

== Schedule ==
Date	Time	Opponent	Site	TV	Result	Attendance	Source
September 4	7:00 p.m.	North Texas State*	Baylor Stadium; Waco, TX		W 21–17	24,000	
September 11		at No. 14 Ohio State*	Ohio Stadium; Columbus, OH		L 14–21	88,622	
September 25		at Texas Tech	Jones Stadium; Lubbock, TX (rivalry)		W 24–23	46,049	
October 2		Houston	Baylor Stadium; Waco, TX (rivalry)	ABC	T 21–21	31,750	
October 9		No. 6 SMU	Baylor Stadium; Waco, TX		L 19–22	30,000	
October 16		at Texas A&M	Kyle Field; College Station, TX (rivalry)		L 23–28	64,017	
October 23		at TCU	Amon G. Carter Stadium; Fort Worth, TX (rivalry)		L 14–38	23,811	
October 30		at Tulane*	Louisiana Superdome; New Orleans, LA		L 15–30	23,463	
November 6		No. 5 Arkansas^{†}	Baylor Stadium; Waco, TX		W 24–17	42,000	
November 13		at Rice	Rice Stadium; Houston, TX		W 35–13	12,000	
November 20		No. 17 Texas	Baylor Stadium; Waco, TX (rivalry)		L 23–31	38,000	
*Non-conference game; ^{†}Homecoming; Rankings from AP Poll released prior to the game; All times are in Central time

== After the season ==
The following players were drafted into professional football following the season.

Player	Position	Round	Pick	Franchise
Cedric Mack	Defensive back	2	44	St. Louis Cardinals
Randy Grimes	Center	2	45	Tampa Bay Buccaneers
Charles Benson	Defensive end	3	76	Miami Dolphins
Bo Scott Metcalf	Defensive back	4	106	Pittsburgh Steelers
Mark Kirchner	Guard	7	191	Pittsburgh Steelers
Geff Gandy	Linebacker	10	279	Washington Redskins
David Mangrum	Quarterback	12	312	Philadelphia Eagles
