= 1982 Sun Bowl =

American college football game

North Carolina Tar Heels	Texas Longhorns
(7–4)	(9–2)
ACC	SWC
26	10
Head coach: Dick Crum	Head coach: Fred Akers
	AP / Coaches; 8 / 7
	1	2	3	4	Total
North Carolina	0	3	0	23	26
Texas	7	3	0	0	10
- Date: December 25, 1982
- Season: 1982
- Stadium: Sun Bowl
- Location: El Paso, Texas
- MVP: TB Rob Rogers (UNC); TB Ethan Horton (UNC); TB Brooks Barwick (UNC)
- Referee: Pat Flood (WAC)
- Attendance: 31,359

United States TV coverage
- Network: CBS
- Announcers: Gary Bender; Pat Haden

The 1982 Sun Bowl was a college football postseason bowl game that featured the North Carolina Tar Heels and the Texas Longhorns.

== Background ==
The Tar Heels had finished tied for 3rd in the Atlantic Coast Conference. This was North Carolina's third Sun Bowl in 10 years, and first since 1974, in their fourth straight season going to a bowl. The Longhorns had finished 2nd in the Southwest Conference after a loss to #4 SMU, though Texas qualified for a bowl for their 6th straight season. This was the Longhorns' third Sun Bowl in four years, and first since 1979. The two teams had faced off in a bowl just two years earlier. Snow flurries and a wind chill reading around 12 degrees were prevalent during the game.

== Game summary ==
Ronnie Mullins recovered a blocked punt in the endzone to give the Longhorns a 7–0 first quarter lead. The Tar Heels responded with a Rob Rogers field goal from 53 yards out in the 2nd quarter. Raul Allegre's 24 yard field goal made it 10–3 at halftime. Texas had a chance in the 3rd quarter to increase the lead, even having the ball at the Tar Heel 1, but they were stopped short and turned the ball over on downs, as the third quarter went scoreless. With 14:51 remaining in the game, Rogers made a field goal from 47 yards out to make it 10–6. Brooks Barwick added field goals from 23 and 42 yards, the latter making it 12–10 Tar Heels with 4:56 left. Ethan Horton ran for a 3 yard score that made it 19–10 with 2:17 remaining. On the ensuing Longhorn drive, a fumble in the endzone led to a Mike Wilcher recovery for a touchdown that made the score 26–10 with 1:35 to go. The rest of the time went scoreless as North Carolina beat Texas in a bowl once again, while also being the first ACC team to win 4 straight bowl games. Texas had just 48 total yards in the second half. Ethan Horton rushed for 119 yards on 27 carries.

== Scoring summary ==
- Texas – Mullins recovers blocked punt in end zone (Allegre kick)
- North Carolina – Rogers 53 FG
- Texas – Allegre 24 FG
- North Carolina – Rogers 47 FG
- North Carolina – Barwick 24 FG
- North Carolina – Barwick 42 FG
- North Carolina – Horton 3 run (Barwick kick)
- North Carolina – Wilcher recovers fumble in end zone (Barwick kick)

== Aftermath ==
The Tar Heels returned to the Sun Bowl in the same year the Longhorns did in 1994 resulting in a 35–31 Texas victory.

== Statistics ==
Statistics	North Carolina	Texas
First downs	15	10
Rushing yards	224	80
Passing yards	10	50
Interceptions thrown	0	1
Total yards	234	130
Return yardage	0	19
Punts–average	6–25.2	5–32.8
Fumbles–lost	3–3	2–2
Penalties–yards	4–20	2–20
