= 1982 UT Arlington Mavericks football team =

American college football season

1982 UT Arlington Mavericks football
- Conference: Southland Conference
- Record: 3–8 (1–5 Southland)
- Head coach: Harold Elliott (9th season)
- Home stadium: Maverick Stadium

1982 Southland Conference football standings
	Conf.					Overall
Team	W		L		T	W		L		T
No. 2 Louisiana Tech $^	5	–	0	–	0	10	–	3	–	0
No. 12 Northeast Louisiana	4	–	1	–	0	8	–	3	–	0
Arkansas State	2	–	3	–	0	5	–	6	–	0
McNeese State	2	–	3	–	0	4	–	6	–	1
Lamar	1	–	4	–	0	4	–	7	–	0
UT Arlington	1	–	4	–	0	3	–	8	–	0
$ – Conference champion; ^ – NCAA Division I-AA playoff participant; Rankings from NCAA Division I-AA Football Committee poll

The 1982 UT Arlington Mavericks football team was an American football team that represented the University of Texas at Arlington in the Southland Conference during the 1982 NCAA Division I-AA football season. In their ninth year under head coach Harold Elliott, the team compiled a 3–8 record.

== Schedule ==
Date	Time	Opponent	Site	Result	Attendance	Source
September 11	7:30 p.m.	Sam Houston State*	Maverick Stadium; Arlington, TX	W 63–10	8,519	
September 18		at Texas A&M*	Kyle Field; College Station, TX	L 22–61	54,098	
September 25		at Northeast Louisiana	Malone Stadium; Monroe, LA	L 16–33	18,250	
October 2	7:30 p.m.	Louisiana Tech	Maverick Stadium; Arlington, TX	L 14–17	8,149	
October 9	7:30 p.m.	North Texas State	Maverick Stadium; Arlington, TX	L 3–17	9,487	
October 16	1:30 p.m.	Southwestern Louisiana*	Maverick Stadium; Arlington, TX	W 30–29	6,094	
October 23	1:30 p.m.	at Wichita State*	Cessna Stadium; Wichita, KS	L 13–30	18,117	
October 30	7:30 p.m.	at McNeese State	Cowboy Stadium; Lake Charles, LA	L 12–38	19,237	
November 6	7:30 p.m.	East Carolina*	Maverick Stadium; Arlington, TX	L 24–40	4,388	
November 13	1:30 p.m.	at Arkansas State	Indian Stadium; Jonesboro, AR	L 17–20	10,352	
November 20		at Lamar	Cardinal Stadium; Beaumont, TX	W 31–24	2,910	
*Non-conference game; All times are in Central time

== Roster ==
1982 Texas–Arlington Mavericks football team roster
Players
Coaches
Offense

Pos.	#	Name	Class
RB	21	Scott Caldwell	So
C	50	Mark Cannon	Jr
OT	69	Bruce Collie	So
TE	88	Darryl Lewis	Sr
WR	87	Bryon Williams	Sr

Defense

Pos.	#	Name	Class
CB	20	Tim McKyer	Fr

Special teams

Pos.	#	Name	Class

Head coach

- Harold Elliott

Coordinators/assistant coaches

Legend

- (C) Team captain
- (S) Suspended
- (I) Ineligible
- Injured
- Redshirt
