= 1982 Rice Owls football team =

American college football season

1982 Rice Owls football
- Conference: Southwest Conference
- Record: 0–11 (0–8 SWC)
- Head coach: Ray Alborn (5th season)
- Home stadium: Rice Stadium

1982 Southwest Conference football standings
	Conf.					Overall
Team	W		L		T	W		L		T
No. 2 SMU $	7	–	0	–	1	11	–	0	–	1
No. 17 Texas	7	–	1	–	0	9	–	3	–	0
No. 9 Arkansas	5	–	2	–	1	9	–	2	–	1
Houston	4	–	3	–	1	5	–	5	–	1
Baylor	3	–	4	–	1	4	–	6	–	1
Texas Tech	3	–	5	–	0	4	–	7	–	0
Texas A&M	3	–	5	–	0	5	–	6	–	0
TCU	2	–	6	–	0	3	–	8	–	0
Rice	0	–	8	–	0	0	–	11	–	0
$ – Conference champion; Rankings from AP Poll

The 1982 Rice Owls football team was an American football team that represented Rice University in the Southwest Conference during the 1982 NCAA Division I-A football season. In their fifth year under head coach Ray Alborn, the team compiled an 0–11 record.

== Schedule ==
Date	Opponent	Site	Result	Attendance	Source
September 11	Southwestern Louisiana*	Rice Stadium; Houston, TX	L 14–21		
September 18	at Tulane*	Louisiana Superdome; New Orleans, LA	L 6–30	33,460	
September 25	at LSU*	Tiger Stadium; Baton Rouge, LA	L 13–52	75,040	
October 2	No. 15 Texas	Rice Stadium; Houston, TX (rivalry)	L 7–34	50,000	
October 9	at TCU	Amon G. Carter Stadium; Fort Worth, TX	L 16–24	20,278	
October 16	Texas Tech	Rice Stadium; Houston, TX	L 21–23	25,000	
October 23	at Texas A&M	Kyle Field; College Station, TX	L 7–49	53,767	
October 30	at No. 5 Arkansas	Razorback Stadium; Fayetteville, AR	L 6–24	44,620	
November 6	No. 2 SMU	Rice Stadium; Houston, TX (rivalry)	L 14–41	25,000	
November 13	Baylor	Rice Stadium; Houston, TX	L 13–35	12,000	
November 27	at Houston	Houston Astrodome; Houston, TX (rivalry)	L 21–28	20,103	
*Non-conference game; Rankings from AP Poll released prior to the game
