= Ken Stephens =

American football player and coach (1931–2023)

Biographical details
- Born: April 2, 1931; Conway, Arkansas, U.S.
- Died: August 28, 2023 (aged 92); Conway, Arkansas, U.S.

Playing career

Football
- 1949–1951: Arkansas State Teachers

Track and field
- c. 1950: Arkansas State Teachers
- Position: Defensive back (football)

Coaching career (HC unless noted)

Football
- 1952: Crossett HS (AR) (assistant)
- 1953: Bethany HS (OK)
- 1956–1957: Walnut Ridge HS (AR)
- 1958–1959: Conway HS (AR)
- 1960: Arkansas State (assistant)
- 1962: Morrilton HS (AR)
- 1963–1970: North Little Rock HS (AR)
- 1971: Arkansas (assistant)
- 1972–1981: State College of Arkansas / Central Arkansas
- 1982–1985: Lamar
- 1986–1992: Arkansas Tech
- 2001–2004: Ranger

Golf
- 2000: Central Arkansas

Head coaching record
- Overall: 106–106–8 (college football); 15–25 (junior college football)
- Tournaments: Football; 1–4 (NAIA D-I playoffs)

Accomplishments and honors

Championships
- Football; 4 AIC (1976, 1978, 1980–1981)

Kenneth Gene Stephens (April 2, 1931 – August 28, 2023) was an American football coach. He served as head coach of the University of Central Arkansas from 1972 to 1981 Lamar University from 1982 to 1985, and Arkansas Tech University from 1986 to 1992, compiling a career college football coaching record of 106–106–8.

Stephens was a graduate of Central Arkansas, where he played as a defensive back and still holds the record for interceptions in a game with five. Stephens also competed in track and field, where he was the NAIA runner-up in the 120-yard hurdles in 1951 and 1952. He began his coaching career at the high school level, winning three state championships at North Little Rock, Arkansas, before moving on the Arkansas State University and the University of Arkansas as an assistant. He was appointed head coach at his alma mater in 1972. In 10 seasons, Stephens built a 67–35–6 record at Central Arkansas, third-best in school history only to his two successors, winning four Arkansas Intercollegiate Conference titles and taking the Bears to four NAIA playoffs, the first in school history.

In 1982, Stephens went on to coach at Lamar University in Beaumont, Texas, but resigned in 1985 after four consecutive losing seasons. He then became head coach at Arkansas Tech, spending seven seasons there before retiring in 1992. Stephens returned to coaching in 2001, taking over as head coach at Ranger College in Ranger, Texas, for four seasons.

On February 28, 2014, Stephens was inducted into the Arkansas Sports Hall of Fame.

Stephens died in Conway on August 28, 2023, at the age of 92.

== Head coaching record ==
=== College football ===
Year	Team	Overall	Conference	Standing	Bowl/playoffs
State College of Arkansas / Central Arkansas Bears (Arkansas Intercollegiate Conference) (1972–1981)
1972	State College of Arkansas	2–7–1	0–5–1	7th	
1973	State College of Arkansas	6–5	3–3	4th	
1974	State College of Arkansas	6–3–2	2–2–2	T–4th	
1975	Central Arkansas	4–6–1	3–2–1	4th	
1976	Central Arkansas	9–3	5–1	T–1st	L NAIA Division I Championship
1977	Central Arkansas	7–3	4–2	2nd	
1978	Central Arkansas	9–2	6–0	1st	L NAIA Division I Quarterfinal
1979	Central Arkansas	7–2–2	2–2–2	4th	
1980	Central Arkansas	9–1	6–0	1st	L NAIA Division I Quarterfinal
1981	Central Arkansas	8–3	6–0	1st	L NAIA Division I Quarterfinal
State College of Arkansas / Central Arkansas:		67–35–6	37–17–6		
Lamar Cardinals (Southland Conference) (1982–1985)
1982	Lamar	4–7	1–4	T–5th	
1983	Lamar	2–9	1–5	7th	
1984	Lamar	2–9	1–5	T–6th	
1985	Lamar	3–8	0–6	7th	
Lamar:		11–33	3–20		
Arkansas Tech Wonder Boys (Arkansas Intercollegiate Conference) (1986–1992)
1986	Arkansas Tech	6–4	5–2	T–2nd	
1987	Arkansas Tech	2–6–1	1–4–1	7th	
1988	Arkansas Tech	6–4	3–3	3rd	
1989	Arkansas Tech	6–3	3–3	4th	
1990	Arkansas Tech	4–6	0–6	7th	
1991	Arkansas Tech	0–10	0–6	7th	
1992	Arkansas Tech	4–5–1	2–4	5th	
Arkansas Tech:		28–38–2	14–28–1		
Total:		106–106–8			
National championship Conference title Conference division title or championship game berth

=== Junior college football ===
Year	Team	Overall	Conference	Standing	Bowl/playoffs
Ranger Rangers (Southwest Junior College Football Conference) (2001)
2001	Ranger	2–8	1–6	7th	
Ranger Rangers (NJCAA independent) (2002–2004)
2002	Ranger	5–5			
2003	Ranger	4–6			
2004	Ranger	4–6			
Ranger:		15–25	1–6		
Total:		15–25			
