= 1982 McNeese State Cowboys football team =

American college football season

1982 McNeese State Cowboys football
- Conference: Southland Conference
- Record: 4–6–1 (2–3 Southland)
- Head coach: Hubert Boales (1st season)
- Home stadium: Cowboy Stadium

1982 Southland Conference football standings
	Conf.					Overall
Team	W		L		T	W		L		T
No. 2 Louisiana Tech $^	5	–	0	–	0	10	–	3	–	0
No. 12 Northeast Louisiana	4	–	1	–	0	8	–	3	–	0
Arkansas State	2	–	3	–	0	5	–	6	–	0
McNeese State	2	–	3	–	0	4	–	6	–	1
Lamar	1	–	4	–	0	4	–	7	–	0
UT Arlington	1	–	4	–	0	3	–	8	–	0
$ – Conference champion; ^ – NCAA Division I-AA playoff participant; Rankings from NCAA Division I-AA Football Committee poll

The 1982 McNeese State Cowboys football team was an American football team that represented McNeese State University as a member of the Southland Conference (Southland) during the 1982 NCAA Division I-AA football season. In their first year under head coach Hubert Boales, the team compiled an overall record of 4–6–1, with a mark of 2–3 in conference play, and finished tied for third in the Southland.

== Schedule ==
Date	Time	Opponent	Site	Result	Attendance	Source
September 4		Texas A&I*	Cowboy Stadium; Lake Charles, LA	W 42–21	22,750	
September 11		Southeastern Louisiana*	Cowboy Stadium; Lake Charles, LA	L 7–17	19,756	
September 18		at Indiana State*	Memorial Stadium; Terre Haute, IN	L 10–13	11,096	
September 25		at West Texas State*	Kimbrough Memorial Stadium; Canyon, TX	L 17–25	12,333	
October 2		at No. 10 Northeast Louisiana	Malone Stadium; Monroe, LA	L 21–35	17,950	
October 9		at Northwestern State*	Harry Turpin Stadium; Natchitoches, LA (rivalry)	W 21–11	20,000	
October 23		at Arkansas State	Indian Stadium; Jonesboro, AR	W 21–10	15,744	
October 30	7:30 p.m.	UT Arlington	Cowboy Stadium; Lake Charles, LA	W 38–12	19,237	
November 6		at No. 2 Louisiana Tech	Joe Aillet Stadium; Ruston, LA	L 14–35	17,600	
November 13		Lamar	Cowboy Stadium; Lake Charles, LA (rivalry)	L 3–12	18,324	
November 20		Southwestern Louisiana*	Cowboy Stadium; Lake Charles, LA (rivalry)	T 10–10	23,100	
*Non-conference game; Rankings from NCAA Division I-AA Football Committee Poll released prior to the game; All times are in Central time
