= David Hardy (American football) =

American football player (born 1959)

No. 4
- Position: Placekicker

Personal information
- Born: July 7, 1959 (age 67); Fort Worth, Texas, U.S.
- Listed height: 5 ft 7 in (1.70 m)
- Listed weight: 180 lb (82 kg)

Career information
- High school: Huntsville (Huntsville, Texas)
- College: Texas A&M
- NFL draft: 1983: undrafted

Career history
- Seattle Seahawks (1983)*; Los Angeles Raiders (1987)
- * Offseason or practice squad member only

Career NFL statistics
- Games played: 2
- Stats at Pro Football Reference

David Robert Hardy (born July 7, 1959) is an American former professional football player who was a placekicker for the Los Angeles Raiders of the National Football League (NFL). He played college football for the Texas A&M Aggies.
