= Gary Moten =

American gridiron football player (born 1961)

No. 63, 55, 69, 58, 72, 59, 53
- Position: Linebacker

Personal information
- Born: April 3, 1961 (age 65); Galveston, Texas, U.S.
- Listed height: 6 ft 1 in (1.85 m)
- Listed weight: 210 lb (95 kg)

Career information
- High school: Brazoswood (TX)
- College: SMU
- NFL draft: 1983: 7th round, 175th overall pick

Career history
- San Francisco 49ers (1983); Los Angeles Express (1985); New Jersey Generals (1985); Winnipeg Blue Bombers (1985); Saskatchewan Roughriders (1986); Toronto Argonauts (1986-1987); Kansas City Chiefs (1987)

Awards and highlights
- First-team All-SWC (1982)
- Stats at Pro Football Reference

Gary Moten (born April 3, 1961) is an American former professional football linebacker. He played for the San Francisco 49ers in 1983, the Los Angeles Express, New Jersey Generals and Winnipeg Blue Bombers in 1985, the Saskatchewan Roughriders in 1986, the Toronto Argonauts from 1986 to 1987 and the Kansas City Chiefs in 1987. He was selected by the San Francisco 49ers in the seventh round (175th overall) of the 1983 NFL Draft.
