= 1982 Texas Longhorns football team =

American college football season

1982 Texas Longhorns football

Sun Bowl, L 10–26 vs. North Carolina
- Conference: Southwest Conference

Ranking
- Coaches: No. 18
- AP: No. 17
- Record: 9–3 (7–1 SWC)
- Head coach: Fred Akers (6th season)
- Offensive coordinator: Ron Toman (2nd season)
- Defensive coordinator: David McWilliams (1st season)
- Home stadium: Texas Memorial Stadium

1982 Southwest Conference football standings
	Conf.					Overall
Team	W		L		T	W		L		T
No. 2 SMU $	7	–	0	–	1	11	–	0	–	1
No. 17 Texas	7	–	1	–	0	9	–	3	–	0
No. 9 Arkansas	5	–	2	–	1	9	–	2	–	1
Houston	4	–	3	–	1	5	–	5	–	1
Baylor	3	–	4	–	1	4	–	6	–	1
Texas Tech	3	–	5	–	0	4	–	7	–	0
Texas A&M	3	–	5	–	0	5	–	6	–	0
TCU	2	–	6	–	0	3	–	8	–	0
Rice	0	–	8	–	0	0	–	11	–	0
$ – Conference champion; Rankings from AP Poll

The 1982 Texas Longhorns football team represented the University of Texas at Austin as a member of the Southwest Conference (SWC) during the 1982 NCAA Division I-A football season. Led by sixth-year head coach Fred Akers, the Longhorns compiled an overall record of 9–3 with a mark of 7–1 in conference play, placing second in the SWC. Texas was invited to Sun Bowl, where the Longhorns lost to North Carolina. The team played home games at Texas Memorial Stadium in Austin, Texas.

== Schedule ==
Date	Time	Opponent	Rank	Site	TV	Result	Attendance	Source
September 18	7:00 p.m.	Utah*	No. 18	Texas Memorial Stadium; Austin, TX		W 21–12	70,158	
September 25	7:00 p.m.	Missouri*	No. 17	Texas Memorial Stadium; Austin, TX		W 21–0	76,438	
October 2	7:30 p.m.	at Rice	No. 15	Rice Stadium; Houston, TX (rivalry)		W 34–7	50,000	
October 9	2:00 p.m.	vs. Oklahoma*	No. 13	Cotton Bowl; Dallas, TX (Red River Shootout)	CBS	L 22–28	75,587	
October 23	2:30 p.m.	No. 4 SMU	No. 19	Texas Memorial Stadium; Austin, TX	ABC	L 17–30	80,157	
October 30	2:00 p.m.	at Texas Tech		Jones Stadium; Lubbock, TX (rivalry)		W 27–0	52,041	
November 6	1:00 p.m.	Houston		Texas Memorial Stadium; Austin, TX		W 50–0	76,657	
November 13	2:00 p.m.	at TCU	No. 20	Amon G. Carter Stadium; Fort Worth, TX (rivalry)		W 38–21	22,468	
November 20	2:00 p.m.	at Baylor	No. 17	Baylor Stadium; Waco, TX (rivalry)		W 31–23	38,000	
November 25	1:00 p.m.	Texas A&M	No. 14	Texas Memorial Stadium; Austin, TX (rivalry)		W 53–16	72,368	
December 4	2:30 p.m.	No. 6 Arkansas	No. 12	Texas Memorial Stadium; Austin, TX (rivalry)	ABC	W 33–7	67,903	
December 25	2:00 p.m.	vs. North Carolina*	No. 8	Sun Bowl; El Paso, TX (Sun Bowl)	CBS	L 10–26	31,359	
*Non-conference game; Rankings from AP Poll released prior to the game; All times are in Central time

== Game summaries ==
=== Oklahoma ===
Oklahoma Sooners vs. Texas Longhorns

Quarter	1	2	3	4	Total
Texas	0	10	0	12	22
Oklahoma	7	7	7	7	28

at Cotton Bowl • Dallas, Texas

- Date: October 9
- Game time: 2:00 p.m.
- Game weather: Partly cloudy; 67 °F (19 °C); wind 17 mph (27 km/h) N
- Game attendance: 75,587
- Referee: Vance Carlson
- TexasSports.com

Game information

Texas

- Robert Brewer
  18/34, 235 Yds, 2 TD, INT
- Darryl Clark
  18 Rush, 66 Yds
- Carl Robinson
  5 Rec, 53 Yds

Oklahoma

Scoring summary

Quarter	Time	Drive			Team	Scoring information	Score	
Quarter	Time	Plays	Yards	TOP	Team	Scoring information	TEX	OU
1	1:20	4	80	1:42	Oklahoma	Dupree 63-yard touchdown run, Keeling kick good	0	7
2	11:08	12	80	5:12	Texas	Walls 6-yard touchdown reception from Brewer, Allegre kick good	7	7
2	3:03	17	80	8:05	Oklahoma	Wilson 3-yard touchdown run, Keeling kick good	7	14
2	1:35	8	65	1:28	Texas	32-yard field goal by Allegre	10	14
3	10:52	4	69	1:39	Oklahoma	Ledbetter 59-yard touchdown run, Keeling kick good	10	21
4	14:57	10	65	3:57	Texas	Walker 3-yard touchdown run, Allegre kick no good	16	21
4	12:30	6	80	2:27	Oklahoma	Ledbetter 6-yard touchdown run, Keeling kick good	16	28
4	11:04	6	69	1:26	Texas	Walls 27-yard touchdown reception from Brewer, 2-point pass failed	22	28
"TOP" = time of possession. For other American football terms, see Glossary of American football.							22	28
