= John Janata =

American football player (born 1961)

No. 72
- Position: Offensive tackle

Personal information
- Born: April 10, 1961 (age 65); Chicago, Illinois, U.S.
- Listed height: 6 ft 7 in (2.01 m)
- Listed weight: 274 lb (124 kg)

Career information
- High school: Las Vegas (NV) Bonanza
- College: Illinois
- NFL draft: 1983: undrafted

Career history
- Chicago Bears (1983); Tampa Bay Buccaneers (1985)*
- * Offseason or practice squad member only

Career NFL statistics
- Games played: 15
- Fumble recoveries: 1
- Stats at Pro Football Reference

John Michael Janata (born April 10, 1961) is an American former professional football player who was a tackle for the Chicago Bears of the National Football League (NFL) in 1983. He played college football for the Illinois Fighting Illini.
