= Mark Kirchner (American football) =

American football player (born 1959)

No. 64. 74, 63
- Positions: Guard, tackle

Personal information
- Born: October 19, 1959 (age 67); Pasadena, Texas, U.S.
- Listed height: 6 ft 3 in (1.91 m)
- Listed weight: 300 lb (136 kg)

Career information
- High school: Deer Park (TX)
- College: Baylor
- NFL draft: 1983: 7th round, 191st overall pick

Career history
- Pittsburgh Steelers (1983); Kansas City Chiefs (1983); Indianapolis Colts (1984–1986)

Awards and highlights
- Second-team All-SWC (1982)

Career NFL statistics
- Games played: 32
- Games started: 7
- Stats at Pro Football Reference

Mark Kirchner (born October 19, 1959) is an American former professional football player who was a guard and tackle in the National Football League (NFL). He played college football for the Baylor Bears. Kirchner played in the NFL for the Pittsburgh Steelers and Kansas City Chiefs in 1983 and for the Indianapolis Colts from 1984 to 1986. He was selected by the Pittsburgh Steelers in the seventh round (191st overall) of the 1983 NFL Draft.
