= 1982 Arkansas State Indians football team =

American college football season

1982 Arkansas State Indians football
- Conference: Southland Conference
- Record: 5–6 (2–3 Southland)
- Head coach: Larry Lacewell (4th season)
- Home stadium: Indian Stadium

1982 Southland Conference football standings
	Conf.					Overall
Team	W		L		T	W		L		T
No. 2 Louisiana Tech $^	5	–	0	–	0	10	–	3	–	0
No. 12 Northeast Louisiana	4	–	1	–	0	8	–	3	–	0
Arkansas State	2	–	3	–	0	5	–	6	–	0
McNeese State	2	–	3	–	0	4	–	6	–	1
Lamar	1	–	4	–	0	4	–	7	–	0
UT Arlington	1	–	4	–	0	3	–	8	–	0
$ – Conference champion; ^ – NCAA Division I-AA playoff participant; Rankings from NCAA Division I-AA Football Committee poll

The 1982 Arkansas State Indians football team was an American football team that represented the Arkansas State University as a member of the Southland Conference during the 1982 NCAA Division I-AA football season. In their fourth season under head coach Larry Lacewell, the Indians compiled an overall record of 5–6 with a mark of 2–3 in conference play, tying for third place in the Southland.

== Schedule ==
Date	Time	Opponent	Rank	Site	Result	Attendance	Source
September 11		at Mississippi State*		Scott Field; Starkville, MS	L 10–31	30,215	
September 18		Chattanooga*		Indian Stadium; Jonesboro, AR	W 13–12	13,764	
September 25		at Southern Illinois*		McAndrew Stadium; Carbondale, IL	W 35–30	15,600	
October 2		at No. 5 (I-A) Alabama*		Legion Field; Birmingham, AL	L 7–34	67,459	
October 9		at Southwestern Louisiana*	No. 17	Cajun Field; Lafayette, LA	W 20–13	23,122	
October 16		No. 16 Northeast Louisiana	No. 13	Indian Stadium; Jonesboro, AR	L 21–31	18,228	
October 23		McNeese State^{†}		Indian Stadium; Jonesboro, AR	L 10–21	15,744	
October 30		No. 2 Louisiana Tech		Indian Stadium; Jonesboro, AR	L 14–24	10,047	
November 6		at Lamar		Cardinal Stadium; Beaumont, TX	W 20–19	3,054	
November 13	7:30 p.m.	UT Arlington		Indian Stadium; Jonesboro, AR	W 20–17	10,352	
November 27		at Memphis State*		Liberty Bowl Memorial Stadium; Memphis, TN (rivalry)	L 0–12	6,230	
*Non-conference game; ^{†}Homecoming; Rankings from NCAA Division I-AA Football Committee Poll released prior to the game; All times are in Central time
