= 1982 TCU Horned Frogs football team =

American college football season

1982 TCU Horned Frogs football
- Conference: Southwest Conference
- Record: 3–8 (2–6 SWC)
- Head coach: F. A. Dry (6th season)
- Offensive scheme: Pro-style
- Defensive coordinator: Bob Junko (7th season)
- Base defense: 4–3
- Home stadium: Amon G. Carter Stadium

1982 Southwest Conference football standings
	Conf.					Overall
Team	W		L		T	W		L		T
No. 2 SMU $	7	–	0	–	1	11	–	0	–	1
No. 17 Texas	7	–	1	–	0	9	–	3	–	0
No. 9 Arkansas	5	–	2	–	1	9	–	2	–	1
Houston	4	–	3	–	1	5	–	5	–	1
Baylor	3	–	4	–	1	4	–	6	–	1
Texas Tech	3	–	5	–	0	4	–	7	–	0
Texas A&M	3	–	5	–	0	5	–	6	–	0
TCU	2	–	6	–	0	3	–	8	–	0
Rice	0	–	8	–	0	0	–	11	–	0
$ – Conference champion; Rankings from AP Poll

The 1982 TCU Horned Frogs football team represented Texas Christian University (TCU) in the 1982 NCAA Division I-A football season. The Horned Frogs finished the season 3–8 overall and 2–6 in the Southwest Conference. The team was coached by F. A. Dry, in his sixth and final year as head coach. The Frogs played their home games in Amon G. Carter Stadium, which is located on campus in Fort Worth, Texas.

== Schedule ==
Date	Opponent	Site	Result	Attendance	Source
September 11	Utah State*	Amon G. Carter Stadium; Fort Worth, TX	W 24–9	17,423	
September 18	at Kansas*	Memorial Stadium; Lawrence, KS	L 19–30	30,500	
September 25	at No. 6 SMU	Texas Stadium; Irving, TX (rivalry)	L 13–16	43,325	
October 2	at No. 10 Arkansas	War Memorial Stadium; Little Rock, AR	L 0–35	54,808	
October 9	Rice	Amon G. Carter Stadium; Fort Worth, TX	W 24–16	20,278	
October 16	at Ole Miss*	Hemingway Stadium; Oxford, MS	L 9–27	40,162	
October 23	Baylor	Amon G. Carter Stadium; Fort Worth, TX (rivalry)	W 38–14	23,811	
October 30	at Houston	Houston Astrodome; Houston, TX	L 27–31	21,103	
November 6	Texas Tech	Amon G. Carter Stadium; Fort Worth, TX (rivalry)	L 14–16	22,104	
November 13	No. 20 Texas	Amon G. Carter Stadium; Fort Worth, TX (rivalry)	L 21–38	22,468	
November 20	at Texas A&M	Kyle Field; College Station, TX (rivalry)	L 14–34	51,892	
*Non-conference game; Rankings from AP Poll released prior to the game

== Roster ==
1982 TCU Horned Frogs football team roster
Players
Coaches
Offense

Pos.	#	Name	Class
RB	36	Kenneth Davis	Fr
C	51	Mike Flynn	Jr
WR	88	James Maness	So
QB	10	Anthony Sciaraffa	So
TE	80	Dan Sharp	So

Defense

Pos.	#	Name	Class
LB	89	Kyle Clifton	Jr
DE	93	Greg Townsend

Special teams

Pos.	#	Name	Class

Head coach

- F. A. Dry

Coordinators/assistant coaches

Legend

- (C) Team captain
- (S) Suspended
- (I) Ineligible
- Injured
- Redshirt
