= 1982 Northeast Louisiana Indians football team =

American college football season

1982 Northeast Louisiana Indians football
- Conference: Southland Conference
- Record: 8–3 (4–1 SLC)
- Head coach: Pat Collins (2nd season)
- Home stadium: Malone Stadium

1982 Southland Conference football standings
	Conf.					Overall
Team	W		L		T	W		L		T
No. 2 Louisiana Tech $^	5	–	0	–	0	10	–	3	–	0
No. 12 Northeast Louisiana	4	–	1	–	0	8	–	3	–	0
Arkansas State	2	–	3	–	0	5	–	6	–	0
McNeese State	2	–	3	–	0	4	–	6	–	1
Lamar	1	–	4	–	0	4	–	7	–	0
UT Arlington	1	–	4	–	0	3	–	8	–	0
$ – Conference champion; ^ – NCAA Division I-AA playoff participant; Rankings from NCAA Division I-AA Football Committee poll

The 1982 Northeast Louisiana Indians football team was an American football team that represented Northeast Louisiana University (now known as the University of Louisiana at Monroe) as part of the Southland Conference during the 1982 NCAA Division I-AA football season. In their second year under head coach Pat Collins, the team compiled a 8–3 record.

== Schedule ==
Date	Time	Opponent	Rank	Site	Result	Attendance	Source
September 4		at Southern Miss*		M. M. Roberts Stadium; Hattiesburg, MS	L 27–45	30,767	
September 11		at Nicholls State*		John L. Guidry Stadium; Thibodaux, LA	W 29–14	6,598	
September 18	1:38 p.m.	at North Texas State*		Fouts Field; Denton, TX	W 38–15	9,450	
September 25		UT Arlington		Malone Stadium; Monroe, LA	W 33–16	18,250	
October 2		McNeese State	No. 10	Malone Stadium; Monroe, LA	W 35–21	17,950	
October 9		No. 10 Louisiana Tech	No. 7	Malone Stadium; Monroe, LA (rivalry)	L 10–17	23,940	
October 16		at No. 13 Arkansas State	No. 16	Indian Stadium; Jonesboro, AR	W 31–21	18,228	
October 23		Southeastern Louisiana*	No. 11	Malone Stadium; Monroe, LA	W 42–0	17,950	
October 30		at Lamar	No. 5	Cardinal Stadium; Beaumont, TX	W 14–0	8,106	
November 6		at Southwestern Louisiana*	No. 5	Cajun Field; Lafayette, LA	L 26–40	25,133	
November 20		Northwestern State*	No. 15	Malone Stadium; Monroe, LA (rivalry)	W 28–27	16,000	
*Non-conference game; Rankings from NCAA Division I-AA Football Committee Poll released prior to the game; All times are in Central time
