= Mike Harmon (American football) =

American football player (born 1961)

No. 23
- Position: Wide receiver

Personal information
- Born: July 24, 1961 (age 65); Kosciusko, Mississippi, U.S.
- Listed height: 6 ft 0 in (1.83 m)
- Listed weight: 185 lb (84 kg)

Career information
- High school: Kosciusko
- College: Ole Miss
- NFL draft: 1983: 11th round, 301st overall pick

Career history
- New York Jets (1983); Cleveland Browns (1984)*
- * Offseason or practice squad member only

Career NFL statistics
- Receptions: 1
- Receiving yards: 4
- Return yards: 109
- Stats at Pro Football Reference

Mike Harmon (born July 24, 1961) is an American former professional football player who was a wide receiver for the New York Jets of the National Football League (NFL) in 1983. He was selected 303rd overall in the 11th round of the 1983 NFL Draft. He played college football for the Ole Miss Rebels.
