= 1982 Houston Cougars football team =

American college football season

1982 Houston Cougars football
- Conference: Southwest Conference
- Record: 5–5–1 (4–3–1 SWC)
- Head coach: Bill Yeoman (21st season)
- Defensive coordinator: Don Todd (11th season)
- Captains: Maceo Fifer; Greg Harmon; Weedy Harris
- Home stadium: Houston Astrodome

1982 Southwest Conference football standings
	Conf.					Overall
Team	W		L		T	W		L		T
No. 2 SMU $	7	–	0	–	1	11	–	0	–	1
No. 17 Texas	7	–	1	–	0	9	–	3	–	0
No. 9 Arkansas	5	–	2	–	1	9	–	2	–	1
Houston	4	–	3	–	1	5	–	5	–	1
Baylor	3	–	4	–	1	4	–	6	–	1
Texas Tech	3	–	5	–	0	4	–	7	–	0
Texas A&M	3	–	5	–	0	5	–	6	–	0
TCU	2	–	6	–	0	3	–	8	–	0
Rice	0	–	8	–	0	0	–	11	–	0
$ – Conference champion; Rankings from AP Poll

The 1982 Houston Cougars football team represented the University of Houston during the 1982 NCAA Division I-A football season. The Cougars were led by 21st-year head coach Bill Yeoman and played their home games at the Astrodome in Houston, Texas. The team competed as members of the Southwest Conference, finishing in fourth. Houston was not invited to a bowl game for the first time since 1977, finishing the season with a 5–5–1 record.

== Schedule ==
Date	Time	Opponent	Site	TV	Result	Attendance	Source
September 11	2:50 p.m.	at No. 19 Miami (FL)*	Miami Orange Bowl; Miami, FL	ABC	L 12–31	24,687	
September 18		No. 13 Arizona State*	Houston Astrodome; Houston, TX	ESPN	L 10–24	30,103	
September 25		Lamar*	Houston Astrodome; Houston, TX		W 48–3	26,500	
October 2		at Baylor	Baylor Stadium; Waco, TX (rivalry)	ABC	T 21–21	31,750	
October 9		Texas A&M	Houston Astrodome; Houston, TX		W 24–20	46,302	
October 16		at No. 5 SMU	Texas Stadium; Irving, TX (rivalry)	USA	L 14–20	31,817	
October 23		No. 6 Arkansas^{†}	Houston Astrodome; Houston, TX	CBS	L 3–38	37,503	
October 30		TCU	Houston Astrodome; Houston, TX		W 31–27	21,103	
November 6		at Texas	Texas Memorial Stadium; Austin, TX	ESPN	L 0–50	76,657	
November 20		at Texas Tech	Jones Stadium; Lubbock, TX (rivalry)		W 24–7	33,548	
November 27		Rice	Houston Astrodome; Houston, TX (rivalry)		W 28–21	20,103	
*Non-conference game; ^{†}Homecoming; Rankings from AP Poll released prior to the game; All times are in Central time
