= 1982 Louisiana Tech Bulldogs football team =

American college football season

1982 Louisiana Tech Bulldogs football

Southland champion

NCAA Division I-AA Semifinal, L 0–17 vs. Delaware
- Conference: Southland Conference

Ranking
- AP: No. 2
- Record: 10–3 (5–0 Southland)
- Head coach: Billy Brewer (3rd season)
- Captains: Matt Dunigan; Mike Sorenson
- Home stadium: Joe Aillet Stadium

1982 Southland Conference football standings
	Conf.					Overall
Team	W		L		T	W		L		T
No. 2 Louisiana Tech $^	5	–	0	–	0	10	–	3	–	0
No. 12 Northeast Louisiana	4	–	1	–	0	8	–	3	–	0
Arkansas State	2	–	3	–	0	5	–	6	–	0
McNeese State	2	–	3	–	0	4	–	6	–	1
Lamar	1	–	4	–	0	4	–	7	–	0
UT Arlington	1	–	4	–	0	3	–	8	–	0
$ – Conference champion; ^ – NCAA Division I-AA playoff participant; Rankings from NCAA Division I-AA Football Committee poll

The 1982 Louisiana Tech Bulldogs football team was an American football team that represented Louisiana Tech University as a member of the Southland Conference during the 1982 NCAA Division I-AA football season. In their third year under head coach Billy Brewer, the team compiled a 10–3 record and finished as Southland Conference champions.

== Schedule ==
Date	Time	Opponent	Rank	Site	Result	Attendance	Source
September 11		West Texas State*		Joe Aillet Stadium; Ruston, LA	W 28–7	12,300	
September 18	6:59 p.m.	Eastern Michigan*		Joe Aillet Stadium; Ruston, LA	W 49–12	17,200	
September 25		at Texas A&M*		Kyle Field; College Station, TX	L 27–38	53,214	
October 2	7:30 p.m.	at UT Arlington		Maverick Stadium; Arlington, TX	W 17–14	8,149	
October 9		at No. 7 Northeast Louisiana*	No. 10	Malone Stadium; Monroe, LA (rivalry)	W 17–10	23,940	
October 16		Lamar	No. 5	Joe Aillet Stadium; Ruston, LA	W 40–13	14,800	
October 23		vs. Northwestern State*	No. 4	Independence Stadium; Shreveport, LA (rivalry)	W 33–0	17,626	
October 30		at Arkansas State	No. 2	Indian Stadium; Jonesboro, AR	W 24–14	10,047	
November 6		McNeese State	No. 2	Joe Aillet Stadium; Ruston, LA	W 35–14	17,600	
November 13		at Southwestern Louisiana*	No. 2	Cajun Field; Lafayette, LA (rivalry)	L 19–29	18,963	
November 20		at Southern Miss*	No. 7	M. M. Roberts Stadium; Hattiesburg, MS (Rivalry in Dixie)	W 13–6	31,256	
December 4		No. 7 South Carolina State*	No. 2	Joe Aillet Stadium; Ruston, LA (NCAA Division I-AA Quarterfinal)	W 38–3	13,000	
December 11		No. 3 Delaware*	No. 2	Joe Aillet Stadium; Ruston, LA (NCAA Division I-AA Semifinal)	L 0–17	8,000	
*Non-conference game; Rankings from NCAA Division I-AA Football Committee Poll released prior to the game; All times are in Central time
