= 1982 Texas Tech Red Raiders football team =

American college football season

1982 Texas Tech Red Raiders football
- Conference: Southwest Conference
- Record: 4–7 (3–5 SWC)
- Head coach: Jerry Moore (2nd season)
- Offensive scheme: I formation
- Defensive coordinator: Jim Bates (3rd season)
- Base defense: 4–3
- Home stadium: Jones Stadium

1982 Southwest Conference football standings
	Conf.					Overall
Team	W		L		T	W		L		T
No. 2 SMU $	7	–	0	–	1	11	–	0	–	1
No. 17 Texas	7	–	1	–	0	9	–	3	–	0
No. 9 Arkansas	5	–	2	–	1	9	–	2	–	1
Houston	4	–	3	–	1	5	–	5	–	1
Baylor	3	–	4	–	1	4	–	6	–	1
Texas Tech	3	–	5	–	0	4	–	7	–	0
Texas A&M	3	–	5	–	0	5	–	6	–	0
TCU	2	–	6	–	0	3	–	8	–	0
Rice	0	–	8	–	0	0	–	11	–	0
$ – Conference champion; Rankings from AP Poll

The 1982 Texas Tech Red Raiders football team represented Texas Tech University as a member of the Southwest Conference (SWC) during the 1982 NCAA Division I-A football season. In their second season under head coach Jerry Moore, the Red Raiders compiled a 4–7 record (3–5 against SWC opponents), were outscored by a combined total of 234 to 157, and finished in a tie for sixth place in the conference. The team played its home games at Clifford B. and Audrey Jones Stadium in Lubbock, Texas.

== Schedule ==
Date	Time	Opponent	Site	TV	Result	Attendance	Source
September 11		at New Mexico*	University Stadium; Albuquerque, NM		L 0–14	22,720	
September 18	7:31 p.m.	Air Force*	Jones Stadium; Lubbock, TX		W 31–30	38,694	
September 25		Baylor^{†}	Jones Stadium; Lubbock, TX (rivalry)		L 23–24	46,069	
October 2		at Texas A&M	Kyle Field; College Station, TX (rivalry)	CBS	W 24–15	59,416	
October 9		at No. 9 Arkansas	Razorback Stadium; Fayetteville, AR (rivalry)		L 3–21	44,024	
October 16		at Rice	Rice Stadium; Houston, TX		W 23–21	25,000	
October 23		at No. 1 Washington*	Husky Stadium; Seattle, WA		L 3–10	58,458	
October 30		Texas	Jones Stadium; Lubbock, TX (rivalry)		L 0–27	52,041	
November 6		at TCU	Amon G. Carter Stadium; Fort Worth, TX (rivalry)		W 16–14	22,104	
November 13		No. 2 SMU	Jones Stadium; Lubbock, TX		L 27–34	45,954	
November 20		Houston	Jones Stadium; Lubbock, TX (rivalry)		L 7–24	33,548	
*Non-conference game; ^{†}Homecoming; Rankings from AP Poll released prior to the game; All times are in Central time
