= Jay Evans =

Jay Evans may refer to:

- Jay Thomas Evans (1931–2008), American Olympic wrestler
- Dale Evans (wide receiver) (born Jay Dale Evans; 1939–2017), American football player

== See also ==
- James Evans (disambiguation)
- Dale Evans (disambiguation)
