= 1982 Colorado Buffaloes football team =

American college football season

1982 Colorado Buffaloes football
- Conference: Big Eight Conference
- Record: 2–8–1 (1–5–1 Big 8)
- Head coach: Bill McCartney (1st season)
- Offensive coordinator: Bill McCartney (1st season)
- Offensive scheme: Multiple
- Defensive coordinator: Dale Evans (1st season)
- Base defense: 3–4
- MVP: Ray Cone
- Captains: Dave Hestera; Mark Shoop
- Home stadium: Folsom Field

1982 Big Eight Conference football standings
	Conf.					Overall
Team	W		L		T	W		L		T
No. 3 Nebraska $	7	–	0	–	0	12	–	1	–	0
No. 16 Oklahoma	6	–	1	–	0	8	–	4	–	0
Oklahoma State	3	–	2	–	2	4	–	5	–	2
Kansas State	3	–	3	–	1	6	–	5	–	1
Missouri	2	–	3	–	2	5	–	4	–	2
Iowa State	1	–	5	–	1	4	–	6	–	1
Kansas	1	–	5	–	1	2	–	7	–	2
Colorado	1	–	5	–	1	2	–	8	–	1
$ – Conference champion; Rankings from AP Poll

The 1982 Colorado Buffaloes football team represented the University of Colorado in the Big Eight Conference during the 1982 NCAA Division I-A football season. Led by first-year head coach Bill McCartney, the Buffaloes finished at 2–8–1 (1–5–1 in Big 8, tied for last), their fourth consecutive losing season. Home games were played on campus at Folsom Field in Boulder, Colorado.

After three disappointing seasons in Boulder (1979–81), head coach Chuck Fairbanks resigned in early June 1982 to become the head coach, president, and minority owner of the New Jersey Generals of the new United States Football League (USFL). McCartney, the defensive coordinator at Michigan under Bo Schembechler, was announced as Colorado's new head coach on June 9, and led the program for thirteen seasons, through 1994.

It was the second year of blue jerseys for the Buffaloes, which were phased out in 1984.

== Schedule ==
Date	Time	Opponent	Site	TV	Result	Attendance	Source
September 11	1:31 p.m.	California*	Folsom Field; Boulder, CO		L 17–31	35,103	
September 18		at Washington State*	Joe Albi Stadium; Spokane, WA	KWGN	W 12–0	30,923	
September 25		Wyoming*	Folsom Field; Boulder, CO		L 10–24	40,593	
October 2		No. 9 UCLA*	Folsom Field; Boulder, CO	KTLA	L 6–34	38,702	
October 9		No. 7 Nebraska	Folsom Field; Boulder, Colorado (rivalry)	ABC	L 14–40	53,022	
October 16		at Oklahoma State	Lewis Field; Stillwater, OK		T 25–25	47,250	
October 23		Iowa State^{†}	Folsom Field; Boulder, CO	WOI	L 14–31	40,581	
October 30		No. 17 Oklahoma	Folsom Field; Boulder, CO	KTVY	L 10–45	43,908	
November 6		at Missouri	Faurot Field; Columbia, MO		L 14–35	46,312	
November 13		Kansas	Folsom Field; Boulder, CO		W 28–3	35,114	
November 20		at Kansas State	KSU Stadium; Manhattan, KS (rivalry)		L 10–33	24,300	
*Non-conference game; ^{†}Homecoming; Rankings from AP Poll released prior to the game; All times are in Mountain time

== Personnel ==
1982 Colorado Buffaloes football team roster
Players
Coaches
Offense

Pos.	#	Name	Class
QB		Randy Essington
OL		John Firm
WR		Richard Johnson
OL		Vince Rafferty

Defense

Pos.	#	Name	Class

Special teams

Pos.	#	Name	Class
K		Tom Field	Jr

Head coach

- Bill McCartney (1st year)

Coordinators/assistant coaches

- Dale Evans (DC)

Legend

- (C) Team captain
- (S) Suspended
- (I) Ineligible
- Injured
- Redshirt

== Game summaries ==
=== Washington State ===
Team	1	2	3	4	Total
• Colorado	3	6	0	3	12
Washington St	0	0	0	0	0

- Date: September 18
- Location:
  Joe Albi Stadium, Spokane, Washington
- Game start: 5:00 pm MDT
- Game attendance: 30,923

Scoring summary
1	6:16	COL	Field 31 yard field goal	COL 3-0
2		COL	Field 39 yard field goal	COL 6-0
2		COL	Field 44 yard field goal	COL 9-0
4		COL	Field 24 yard field goal	COL 12-0

Colorado's first road win since 1979 versus Kansas
