= Dale Evans (disambiguation) =

Dale Evans may refer to:

- Dale Evans (1912–2001), American actress
- Dale Evans (American football, born 1937) (1937–2014), American football coach
- Dale Evans (wide receiver) (1939–2017), American football player
- Dale Evans (footballer) (born 1960), Australian rules footballer
