= 1982 Nebraska Cornhuskers football team =

American college football season

1982 Nebraska Cornhuskers football

Big Eight champion Orange Bowl champion

Orange Bowl, W 21–20 vs. LSU
- Conference: Big Eight Conference

Ranking
- Coaches: No. 3
- AP: No. 3
- Record: 12–1 (7–0 Big Eight)
- Head coach: Tom Osborne (10th season)
- Offensive scheme: I formation
- Defensive coordinator: Charlie McBride (2nd season)
- Base defense: 5–2
- Home stadium: Memorial Stadium

1982 Big Eight Conference football standings
	Conf.					Overall
Team	W		L		T	W		L		T
No. 3 Nebraska $	7	–	0	–	0	12	–	1	–	0
No. 16 Oklahoma	6	–	1	–	0	8	–	4	–	0
Oklahoma State	3	–	2	–	2	4	–	5	–	2
Kansas State	3	–	3	–	1	6	–	5	–	1
Missouri	2	–	3	–	2	5	–	4	–	2
Iowa State	1	–	5	–	1	4	–	6	–	1
Kansas	1	–	5	–	1	2	–	7	–	2
Colorado	1	–	5	–	1	2	–	8	–	1
$ – Conference champion; Rankings from AP Poll

The 1982 Nebraska Cornhuskers football team represented the University of Nebraska–Lincoln in the 1982 NCAA Division I-A football season. The team was coached by Tom Osborne and played their home games in Memorial Stadium in Lincoln, Nebraska.

== Schedule ==
Date	Time	Opponent	Rank	Site	TV	Result	Attendance	Source
September 11	1:30 pm	Iowa*	No. 3	Memorial Stadium; Lincoln, NE (rivalry)	ESPN	W 42–7	76,013	
September 18	1:30 pm	New Mexico State*	No. 3	Memorial Stadium; Lincoln, NE		W 68–0	76,141	
September 25	2:45 pm	at No. 8 Penn State*	No. 2	Beaver Stadium; University Park, PA	CBS	L 24–27	85,304	
October 2	1:30 pm	at No. 20 Auburn*	No. 8	Jordan-Hare Stadium; Auburn, AL		W 41–7	73,900	
October 9	2:30 pm	at Colorado	No. 7	Folsom Field; Boulder, CO (rivalry)		W 40–14	53,022	
October 16	1:30 pm	Kansas State^{†}	No. 6	Memorial Stadium; Lincoln, NE (rivalry)		W 42–13	76,268	
October 23	2:50 pm	Missouri	No. 5	Memorial Stadium; Lincoln, NE (rivalry)	ABC	W 23–19	76,406	
October 30	1:30 pm	at Kansas	No. 6	Memorial Stadium; Lawrence, KS (rivalry)		W 52–0	51,172	
November 6	1:30 pm	Oklahoma State	No. 6	Memorial Stadium; Lincoln, NE		W 48–10	76,387	
November 13	1:30 pm	at Iowa State	No. 4	Cyclone Stadium; Ames, IA (rivalry)		W 48–10	52,887	
November 26	1:45 pm	No. 11 Oklahoma	No. 3	Memorial Stadium; Lincoln, NE (rivalry)	CBS	W 28–24	76,398	
December 4	11:30 pm	at Hawaii*	No. 3	Aloha Stadium; Halawa, HI		W 37–16	46,876	
January 1, 1983	7:00 pm	vs. No. 13 LSU*	No. 3	Miami Orange Bowl; Miami, FL (Orange Bowl)	NBC	W 21–20	54,407	
*Non-conference game; ^{†}Homecoming; Rankings from AP Poll released prior to the game; All times are in Central time

== Roster ==
Behning, Mark #73 (So.) OT; Biggers, Kevin #13 (Jr.) CB; Bourn, Don #92 (So.) TE; Brown, Todd #29 (Sr.) SE; Brungardt, Tim #32 (Jr.) IB; Buchanan, Eric #82 (So.) DE; Burke, Dave #33 (So.) CB; Campbell, Grant #24 (Sr.) P Clark, Bret #10 (So.) S Craig, Roger #21 (Sr.) IB; Damkroger, Steve #35 (Sr.) LB; Daum, Mark #51 (So.) LB; Denny, Gregorio #36 (Fr.) IB; Engebritson, Monte #83 (Jr.) TE; Evans, Brent #48 (Sr.) LB; Felici, Tony #46 (Sr.) DE; Fisher, Todd #6 (So.) CB; Fryar, Irving #27 (Jr.) WB; Gdowski, Tom #93 (Sr.) DT; Gill, Turner #12 (Jr.) QB; Glathar, Kurt #69 (Sr.) OG; Graeber, Ken #52 (So.) MG; Greene, Ricky #5 (So.) CB; Grimminger, Harry #58 (So.) OG; Haase, David #4 (Jr.) S Hagerman, Mark #9 (Sr.) PK; Harris, Neil #11 (So.) CB; Herrmann, Doug #63 (Jr.) DT; Hill, Dan #84 (Sr.) TE; Hill, Pete #41 (So.) DE; Holbrook, Tim #23 (Sr.) MON	Huebert, Randy #31 (Sr.) WB; Johnson, Brad #55 (Sr.) C Keeler, Mike #61 (Jr.) DT; Kimball, Scott #88 (So.) SE; Knox, Mike #44 (So.) LB; Krenk, Mitch #89 (Sr.) TE; Kwapick, Jeff #70 (Sr.) OT; Larsen, Pat #3 (Sr.) S Lyday, Allen #18 (Sr.) CB; Mandelko, Mike #68 (Sr.) OG; Mason, Nate #8 (Jr.) QB; Mathison, Bruce #19 (Sr.) QB; McCashland, Mike #2 (So.) MON; McLaughlin, Scott #59 (So.) OG; McWhirter, Steve #45 (Sr.) LB; Merrell, Jeff #74 (Sr.) MG; Moravec, Mark #40 (Sr.) FB; Morrow, Tom #77 (So.) OT; Muehling, Brad #54 (Jr.) C Murphy, Jim #16 (Jr.) CB; Orton, Greg #67 (So.) OG; Praeuner, Wade #85 (Jr.) DE; Raridon, Scott #72 (Jr.) OT; Rathman, Tom #26 (So.) FB; Reinhardt, John #62 (Jr.) MG; Ridder, Dave #86 (Jr.) DE; Rimington, Dave #50 (Sr.) C Ripa, Dan #43 (So.) LB; Rozier, Mike #30 (Jr.) IB; Schellen, Mark #25 (Jr.) FB	Schneider, Gary (Fr.) CB; Schoening, Lynn #91 (Sr.) PK; Schoettger, Scott #42 (So.) SE; Seibel, Kevin #49 (Sr.) PK; Sherlock, John #66 (Jr.) OT; Simmons, Ricky #7 (Jr.) WB; Smith, Jeff #28 (So.) IB; Steinkuhler, Dean #71 (Jr.) OG; Strasburger, Scott #90 (So.) DE; Stuckey, Rob #75 (So.) DT; Sundberg, Craig #15 (So.) QB; Swanson, Shane #17 (So.) WB; Theiss, Randy #65 (Sr.) OT; Thomas, Anthony #53 (So.) OG; Thompson, Jim #39 (So.) WB; Tramner, Mike #64 (Jr.) MG; Traynowicz, Mark #57 (So.) OT; Turner, Travis #14 (So.) QB; Van Norman, Kris #38 (Sr.) MON; Vergith, Tom #22 (Sr.) SE; Waechter, Kevin #76 (Jr.) DT; Weber, Bill #87 (So.) DE; Weed, Dan #56 (So.) C Wilkening, Doug #34 (Jr.) FB; Williams, Jamie #80 (Sr.) TE; Williams, Toby #97 (Sr.) DT; Wingard, Dan #47 (So.) PK; Zierke, Mike (So.) DT

=== Depth chart ===
Defense

FS
Bret Clark
Pat Larsen
Gary Schneider

INSDIE	INSDIE
Steve McWhirter	Steve Damkroger
Mike Knox	Brent Evans
Kurt Whiteman	Mark Daum

MONSTER BACK
Kris Van-Norman
Tim Holbrook
Mike Mccashland

CB
Dave Burke
Jim Murphy
Brian Pokorny

DE	DT	NT	DT	DE
Tony Felici	Rob Stuckey	Jeff Merrell	Toby Williams	Bill Weber
Scott Strasburger	Jim Skow	Mike Tramner	Tom Gdowski	Wade Praeuner
Dave Ridder	Mike Zierke	Ken Graeber	John Reinhardt	Eric Buchanan

CB
Allen Lyday
Neil Harris
Charlie Cartwright

Offense

SE
Todd Brown
Ricky Simmons
Scott Kimball

LT	LG	C	RG	RT
Randy Theiss	Mike Mandelko	Dave Rimington	Dean Steinkuhler	Jeff Kwapick
Mark Behning	Anthony Thomas	Brad Johnson	Harry Grimminger	Scott Raridon
John Sherlock	Scott McLaughlin	Brad Muehling	Kurt Glather	Mark Traynowicz

TE
Jamie Williams
Mitch Krenk
Dan Hill

WB
Irving Fryar
Shane Swanson
Tom Vergith

QB
Turner Gill
Bruce Mathison
Nate Mason

Key reserves
Season-ending injury
DT Doug Herrman
DT Mike Keeler

FB
Doug Wilkening
Mark Schellen
Mark Moravec

Special teams
PK Kevin Seibel
P Grant Campbell

RB
Mike Rozier
Roger Craig
Jeff Smith

== Coaching staff ==
Name	Title	First year in this position	Years at Nebraska	Alma mater
Tom Osborne	Head Coach; Offensive coordinator	1973	1964–1997	Hastings College
Charlie McBride	Defensive Coordinator	1981	1977–1999	Colorado
Cletus Fischer	Offensive Line		1960–1985	Nebraska
John Melton	Linebackers	1973	1962–1988	Wyoming
Mike Corgan	Running Backs	1962	1962–1982	Notre Dame
Boyd Epley	Head Strength Coach	1969	1969–2003	Nebraska
George Darlington	Defensive Ends		1973–2002	Rutgers
Milt Tenopir	Offensive Line	1974	1974–2002	Sterling
Gene Huey	Receivers	1977	1977–1986	Wyoming
Frank Solich	Head Freshman Coach	1979	1979–2003	Nebraska
Jack Pierce			1979–1991	
Bob Thornton	Secondary	1981	1981–1985	Nebraska

== Game summaries ==
=== Iowa ===
Iowa at #3 Nebraska [box score]

Team	1	2	3	4	Total
Iowa	0	0	0	7	7
• #3 Nebraska	14	14	0	14	42

- Date: 1982-09-11
- Location: Memorial Stadium, Lincoln, Nebraska
- Game attendance: 76,013
- Television network: ESPN

Defending Big Ten Champion Iowa was down 28–0 by halftime, and was only able to muster a single 4th-quarter touchdown against Nebraska reserves to avoid the shutout.

=== New Mexico State ===
New Mexico State at #3 Nebraska [box score]

Team	1	2	3	4	Total
New Mexico State	0	0	0	0	0
• #3 Nebraska	14	14	33	7	68

- Date: 1982-09-18
- Location: Memorial Stadium, Lincoln, Nebraska
- Game attendance: 76,141

Records fell all over as Nebraska steamrolled New Mexico State 68–0 in Lincoln. Nebraska's total of 883 offensive yards, 645 consecutive yards without going backwards, 36 rushing first downs, and 43 total first downs were all new NCAA records.

=== Penn State ===
#2 Nebraska at #8 Penn State [box score]

Team	1	2	3	4	Total
#2 Nebraska	0	7	7	10	24
• #8 Penn State	7	7	7	6	27

- Date: 1982-09-25
- Location: Beaver Stadium, University Park, Pennsylvania
- Game attendance: 85,304

Nebraska fought back from a 7–21 deficit and finally pulled into the lead on an 80-yard drive with 1:18 remaining, yet the Nittany Lions drove right back and handed the Cornhuskers their first and only loss of the season, keyed by a controversial Penn State completion at the sideline, leaving 9 seconds left on the clock. Sixteen years later, Penn State TE Mike McCloskey, the receiver of the controversial catch, admitted he was out of bounds on the play and should have been ruled incomplete. Because the McCloskey "catch" stood, quarterback Todd Blackledge subsequently tossed the game winning catch to Kirk Bowman with 4 seconds remaining.

=== Auburn ===
#8 Nebraska at #20 Auburn [box score]

Team	1	2	3	4	Total
• #8 Nebraska	7	7	7	20	41
#20 Auburn	7	0	0	0	7

- Date: 1982-10-02
- Location: Jordan–Hare Stadium, Auburn, Alabama
- Game attendance: 73,900

The Cornhuskers, demoralized from the loss to Penn State a week earlier, struggled to come to life as Nebraska entered the locker room at halftime with a narrow 14–7 lead. By the end of the 3rd quarter, Nebraska had tacked on another 7 points, while Auburn had turned over the ball three times, and Nebraska finally ran off three straight scores in the 4th to put it away.

=== Colorado ===
#7 Nebraska at Colorado [box score]

Team	1	2	3	4	Total
• #7 Nebraska	7	13	0	20	40
Colorado	0	0	14	0	14

- Date: 1982-10-09
- Location: Folsom Field, Boulder, Colorado
- Game attendance: 53,022

Scoring summary
1	NEB	Doug Wilkening 3-yard run (Kevin Seibel kick)	NEB 7–0
2	NEB	Roger Craig 1-yard run (Kevin Seibel kick)	NEB 14–0
2	NEB	Kevin Seibel 26-yard field goal	NEB 17–0
2	NEB	Kevin Seibel 31-yard field goal	NEB 20–0
3	COL	Richard Johnson 37-yard pass from Randy Essington (Tom Field kick)	NEB 20–7
3	COL	Richard Johnson 24-yard run (Tom Field kick)	NEB 20–14
4	NEB	Mike Rozier 6-yard pass from Turner Gill (pass failed)	NEB 26–14
4	NEB	Mike Rozier 11-yard run (Kevin Seibel kick)	NEB 33–14
4	NEB	Jeff Smith 1-yard run (Kevin Seibel kick)	NEB 40–14

Nebraska LB Steve Damkroger only recorded two interceptions during his Nebraska career, both in this game, as new Colorado coach Bill McCartney had his Colorado Buffaloes gunning for Nebraska through his attempt to establish the Cornhuskers as their main rival to give his squad a target by which to measure their success. At one point, Colorado came within 6 points of the lead, but Damkroger's two interceptions helped put to bed any Colorado upset hopes as Nebraska posted 20 unanswered 4th quarter points for the easy win.

=== Kansas State ===
Kansas State at #6 Nebraska [box score]

Team	1	2	3	4	Total
Kansas State	0	3	10	0	13
• #6 Nebraska	7	14	7	14	42

- Date: 1982-10-16
- Location: Memorial Stadium, Lincoln, Nebraska
- Game attendance: 76,268

Nebraska IB Mike Rozier became the second Nebraska back, after I.M. Hipp, to play back-to-back 200 yard games, and Cornhusker QB Turner Gill set a new Big Eight completion percentage record of 91.7%, as Nebraska had little trouble with Kansas State in Lincoln.

=== Missouri ===
Missouri at #5 Nebraska [box score]

Team	1	2	3	4	Total
Missouri	0	7	3	9	19
• #5 Nebraska	3	3	3	14	23

- Date: 1982-10-23
- Location: Memorial Stadium, Lincoln, Nebraska
- Game attendance: 76,406

Missouri was sniffing an upset after Nebraska QB Turner Gill was forced out by an injury in the 2nd quarter as the Tigers led 7–6, and the pressure was mounting after the Cornhuskers fell behind 9–13 in the 4th quarter, but backup QB Bruce Mathison directed two touchdown drives with help from an interception by Nebraska LB Brent Evans, and although Missouri would score again, the 10-point lead with 2:36 to go was too much for the Tigers to overcome.

=== Kansas ===
#6 Nebraska at Kansas [box score]

Team	1	2	3	4	Total
• #6 Nebraska	7	10	21	14	52
Kansas	0	0	0	0	0

- Date: 1982-10-30
- Location: Memorial Stadium, Lawrence, Kansas
- Game attendance: 50,172

Nebraska cruised to their 14th win in a row over Kansas and their 2nd shutout of the season, piling up 546 yards of offense compared to 69 for the Jayhawks and giving up only one turnover while owning the ball for 34:27. Five different players recorded touchdowns, as the Cornhuskers set out to protest their drop in the poll from #5 to #6 and prove that the previous close call in Missouri was not to be the norm.

=== Oklahoma State ===
Oklahoma State at #6 Nebraska [box score]

Team	1	2	3	4	Total
Oklahoma State	0	7	0	3	10
• #6 Nebraska	7	14	14	13	48

- Date: 1982-11-06
- Location: Memorial Stadium, Lincoln, Nebraska
- Game attendance: 76,387

Oklahoma State runner Ernest Anderson, who later became the NCAA rushing record holder, was held to just 68 yards, while Nebraska IB Mike Rozier broke the Nebraska single season rushing record, held by Bobby Reynolds since 1950, with his 251-yard performance. The Cornhuskers jumped out to a 21-point lead, and the Cowboys only came within 14 before Nebraska left them behind.

=== Iowa State ===
#4 Nebraska at Iowa State [box score]

Team	1	2	3	4	Total
• #4 Nebraska	7	14	14	13	48
Iowa State	7	0	0	3	10

- Date: 1982-11-13
- Location: Cyclone Stadium, Ames, Iowa
- Game attendance: 52,887

Iowa State briefly held Nebraska to just a 7-point lead, long enough for the Cyclones to post a tying score at the end of the 1st quarter, but the Cornhusker offense proved to be impossible to hold back as Nebraska then ran off 28 unanswered points. Iowa State feebly posted a field goal in the 4th quarter, which Nebraska then punctuated with another 13 points to put this one away.

=== Oklahoma ===
#11 Oklahoma at #3 Nebraska [box score]

Team	1	2	3	4	Total
#11 Oklahoma	7	3	14	0	24
• #3 Nebraska	7	14	7	0	28

- Date: 1982-11-26
- Location: Memorial Stadium, Lincoln, Nebraska
- Game attendance: 76,398

A hard-fought, statistically matched game of football powerhouses, Nebraska and Oklahoma traded the lead a few times before both offenses ground to a halt at the end of the 3rd quarter with the Cornhuskers clinging to a 4-point lead. Two 4th quarter Sooner drives crossed Nebraska's 35-yard line without producing points, yet the game remained in doubt until Nebraska DE Scott Strasburger intercepted Oklahoma with 26 seconds left to play and ended the Sooners' hopes for the upset.

=== Hawaii ===
#3 Nebraska at Hawaii [box score]

Team	1	2	3	4	Total
• #3 Nebraska	0	0	7	30	37
Hawaii	7	3	6	0	16

- Date: 1982-12-04
- Location: Aloha Stadium, Honolulu, Hawaii
- Game attendance: 46,876

Few, if any, could have predicted that unranked Hawaii would lead Nebraska 10–0 by halftime and 16–7 at the end of the 3rd quarter, but the Cornhuskers finally found their footing late in this rare, late-season non-conference game and ripped 30 straight unanswered points in the 4th quarter, amassing 479 rushing yards on the day, to escape Honolulu with a 37–16 win.

=== LSU ===
#13 LSU vs #3 Nebraska [box score]

Team	1	2	3	4	Total
#13 LSU	7	7	3	3	20
• #3 Nebraska	7	0	7	7	21

- Date: 1983-01-01
- Location: Miami Orange Bowl, Miami
- Game attendance: 54,407

Nebraska struggled to overcome six turnovers in a game that saw them behind 7–14 at the half, behind 17–14 by the end of the 3rd, and clinging to a 1-point lead after LSU was forced to settle for a field goal in the 4th. Nebraska only punted once compared to the Tigers' six punts, had nearly double the total offensive yards, and a dominating rushing yardage lead, but the LSU ownership of the turnover battle demonstrated the importance of not giving away the ball as Nebraska barely escaped with the win.

== Rankings ==
Ranking movements Legend: ██ Increase in ranking ██ Decrease in ranking
	Week															
Poll	Pre	1	2	3	4	5	6	7	8	9	10	11	12	13	14	Final
AP	4	3	3	2	8	7	6	5	6	6	4	4	3	3	3	3
Coaches																3

== Awards ==
Award	Name(s)
Outland Trophy	Dave Rimington
Lombardi Award	Dave Rimington
National Lineman of the Year	Dave Rimington
Big Eight Athlete of the Year	Dave Rimington
Big Eight Offensive Player of the Year	Mike Rozier
All-America 1st team	Dave Rimington, Mike Rozier
All-America 3rd team	Randy Theiss
All-America honorable mention	Steve Damkroger, Turner Gill, Mike Mandelko, Jamie Williams, Toby Williams
All-Big Eight 1st team	Steve Damkroger, Tony Felici, Turner Gill, Mike Mandelko, Dave Rimington, Mike Rozier, Randy Theiss, Jamie Williams
All-Big Eight 2nd team	Irving Fryar, Jeff Merrell, Allen Lyday, Grant Campbell

== NFL and pro players ==
The following Nebraska players who participated in the 1982 season later moved on to the next level and joined a professional or semi-pro team as draftees or free agents.

Name	Team
Mark Behning	Pittsburgh Steelers
Todd Brown	Montreal Concordes
Bret Clark	Tampa Bay Bandits
Roger Craig	San Francisco 49ers
Irving Fryar	New England Patriots
Turner Gill	Montreal Concordes
Brad Johnson	Boston Breakers
Mike Knox	Denver Broncos
Mitch Krenk	Chicago Bears
Allen Lyday	Houston Oilers
Bruce Mathison	San Diego Chargers
Jeff Merrell	Boston Breakers
Greg Orton	Detroit Lions
Tom Rathman	San Francisco 49ers
Dave Rimington	Cincinnati Bengals
Mike Rozier	Pittsburgh Maulers
Mark Schellen	New Orleans Breakers
Kevin Seibel	Chicago Blitz
Ricky Simmons	Washington Federals
Jeff Smith	Kansas City Chiefs
Dean Steinkuhler	Houston Oilers
Swanson, Shane	Denver Broncos
Mark Traynowicz	Buffalo Bills
Jamie Williams	St. Louis Cardinals
Toby Williams	New England Patriots
