= 1982 Oklahoma State Cowboys football team =

American college football season

1982 Oklahoma State Cowboys football
- Conference: Big Eight Conference
- Record: 4–5–2 (3–2–2 Big 8)
- Head coach: Jimmy Johnson (4th season)
- Home stadium: Lewis Field

1982 Big Eight Conference football standings
	Conf.					Overall
Team	W		L		T	W		L		T
No. 3 Nebraska $	7	–	0	–	0	12	–	1	–	0
No. 16 Oklahoma	6	–	1	–	0	8	–	4	–	0
Oklahoma State	3	–	2	–	2	4	–	5	–	2
Kansas State	3	–	3	–	1	6	–	5	–	1
Missouri	2	–	3	–	2	5	–	4	–	2
Iowa State	1	–	5	–	1	4	–	6	–	1
Kansas	1	–	5	–	1	2	–	7	–	2
Colorado	1	–	5	–	1	2	–	8	–	1
$ – Conference champion; Rankings from AP Poll

The 1982 Oklahoma State Cowboys football team represented Oklahoma State University in the Big Eight Conference during the 1982 NCAA Division I-A football season. In their fourth season under head coach Jimmy Johnson, the Cowboys compiled a 4–5–2 record (3–2–2 against conference opponents), finished in third place in the conference, and were outscored by opponents by a combined total of 267 to 241.

The team's statistical leaders included Ernest Anderson with 1,877 rushing yards ( nation’s leader), Ike Jackson with 1,254 passing yards, Terry Young with 507 receiving yards, and placekicker Larry Roach with 65 points scored.

The team played its home games at Lewis Field in Stillwater, Oklahoma.

== Schedule ==
Date	Time	Opponent	Site	Result	Attendance	Source
September 11	1:30 p.m.	North Texas State*	Lewis Field; Stillwater, OK	W 27–6	45,500	
September 19		at Tulsa*	Skelly Stadium; Tulsa, OK (rivalry)	L 15–25	35,297	
September 25	6:12 p.m.	at Louisville*	Cardinal Stadium; Louisville, KY	L 22–28	21,202	
October 9		Kansas	Lewis Field; Stillwater, OK	T 24–24	43,400	
October 16		Colorado^{†}	Lewis Field; Stillwater, OK	T 25–25	47,250	
October 23		at No. 20 Oklahoma	Oklahoma Memorial Stadium; Norman, OK (Bedlam Series)	L 9–27	76,406	
October 30		Missouri	Lewis Field; Stillwater, OK	W 30–20	38,400	
November 6		at No. 6 Nebraska	Memorial Stadium; Lincoln, NE	L 10–48	76,387	
November 13		at Kansas State	KSU Stadium; Manhattan, KS	W 24–16	30,400	
November 20		Iowa State	Lewis Field; Stillwater, OK	W 49–13	40,200	
November 27		at San Diego State*	Jack Murphy Stadium; San Diego, CA	L 6–35	17,210	
*Non-conference game; ^{†}Homecoming; Rankings from AP Poll released prior to the game; All times are in Central time

== After the season ==
The 1983 NFL draft was held on April 26–27, 1983. The following Cowboys were selected.

Round	Pick	Player	Position	NFL club
4	86	Greg Hill	Defensive back	Houston Oilers
4	98	Gary Lewis	Defensive tackle	New Orleans Saints
9	245	Mike Green	Linebacker	San Diego Chargers
