= Ronald Evans (astronaut) =

American astronaut (1933–1990)

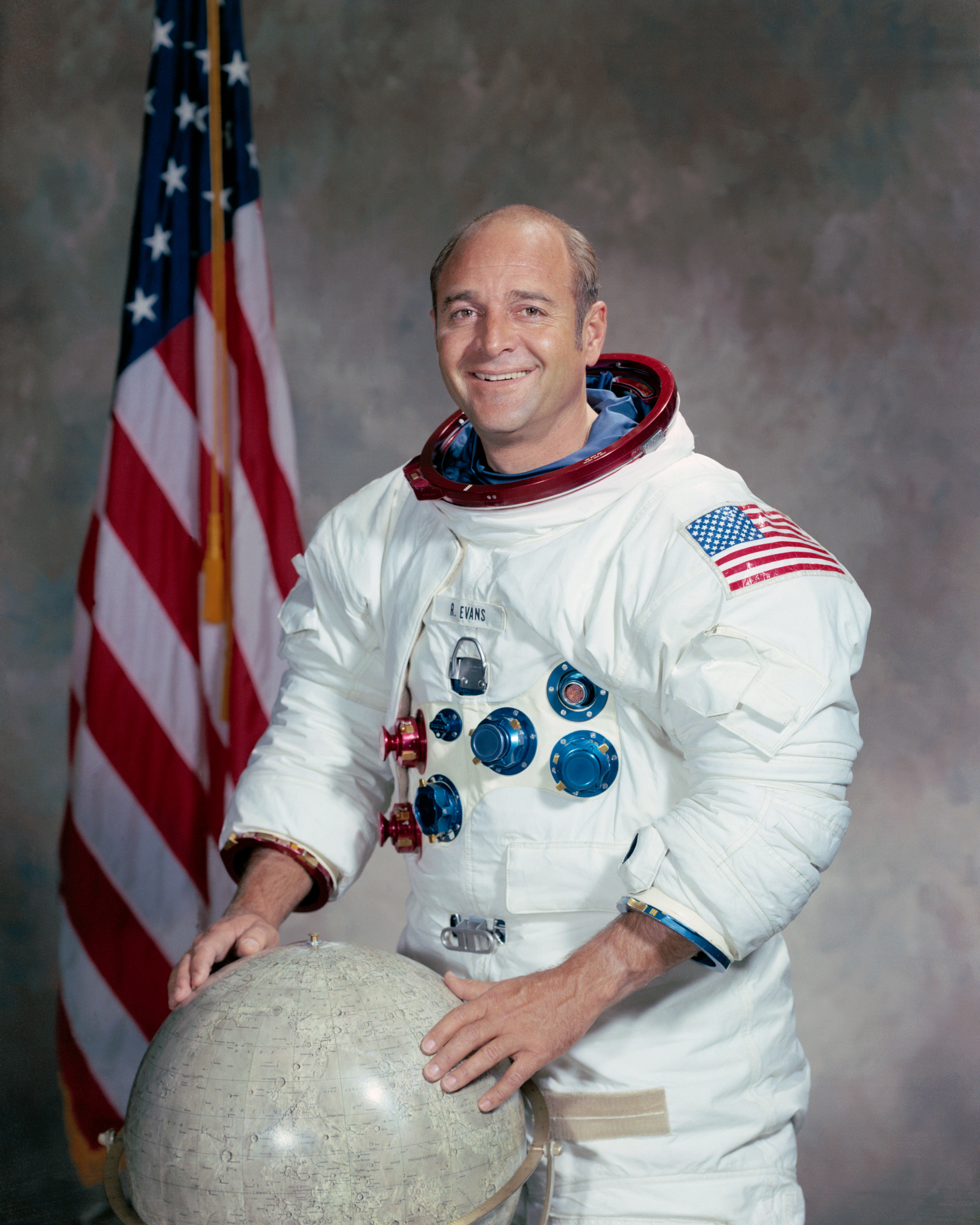
- Evans in 1971
- Born: Ronald Ellwin Evans Jr. November 10, 1933; St. Francis, Kansas, U.S.
- Died: April 6, 1990 (aged 56); Scottsdale, Arizona, U.S.
- Education: University of Kansas (BS); Naval Postgraduate School (MS)
- Awards: NASA Distinguished Service Medal; Navy Distinguished Service Medal; Air Medal (8); Navy Commendation Medal
- Space career

NASA astronaut
- Rank: Captain, USN
- Time in space: 12d 13h 52m
- Selection: NASA Group 5 (1966)
- Total EVAs: 1
- Total EVA time: 1h 5m
- Mission: Apollo 17
- Retired: March 15, 1977

Ronald Ellwin Evans Jr. (November 10, 1933 – April 6, 1990) was an American electrical engineer, aeronautical engineer, officer and aviator in the United States Navy, and NASA astronaut. As Command Module Pilot on Apollo 17 he was one of the 24 Apollo astronauts to fly to the Moon, and one of the 12 to do so without landing.

Before becoming an astronaut, Evans graduated with a Bachelor of Science degree in electrical engineering from the University of Kansas and joined the U.S. Navy in 1956. After receiving his naval aviator wings, he served as a fighter pilot and flew combat missions during the Vietnam War. In 1964 he received a Master of Science degree in aeronautical engineering from the U.S. Naval Postgraduate School. Achieving the rank of captain, he retired from the Navy in 1976.

Evans was selected as an astronaut by NASA as part of NASA Astronaut Group 5 in 1966 and made his only spaceflight as command Module pilot aboard Apollo 17 in December 1972, the last crewed mission to the Moon, with Commander Gene Cernan and Lunar Module Pilot Harrison Schmitt. During the flight, Evans and five mice orbited the Moon a record 75 times as his two crewmates descended to and explored the surface. He is the last person to orbit the Moon alone and, at 147 hours and 43 minutes, holds the record for the most time spent in lunar orbit. During Apollo 17's return flight to Earth, Evans performed an extravehicular activity (EVA) to retrieve film cassettes from the service module. It was the third "deep space" EVA, and is the spacewalk performed at the greatest distance from any planetary body. As of 2026, it remains one of only three deep space EVAs, all made during the Apollo program's J-missions. It was the final spacewalk of the Apollo program.

In 1975, Evans served as backup Command Module Pilot for the Apollo–Soyuz Test Project mission. He worked on the development of the Space Shuttle before retiring from NASA in March 1977 to become a coal industry executive. Evans died from a heart attack in 1990, aged 56.

== Early life and education ==
Ronald Ellwin Evans was born on November 10, 1933, in St. Francis, Kansas, the son of Clarence Ellwin "Jim" Evans and his wife Marie A. (née Priebe). He had two younger siblings, Larry Joe Evans and Jay Evans (better known as Dale). He was active in the Boy Scouts of America where he achieved its second highest rank, Life Scout. He attended St. Francis Elementary School. His father served in the United States Navy during World War II. Evans started his secondary education at St. Francis High School, but only attended for two months before the family moved to Topeka, Kansas to seek medical treatment for his brother Larry, who was diagnosed with liver cancer. Larry died in 1951, and his parents separated. Evans attended Highland Park High School in Topeka, where he served on the Student Council, and was the president of the Science Club. He was a member of the school American football team, and was an All-Conference guard. His other brother, Dale, secured a football scholarship to Kansas State University where he played college football, and later played professionally for the Denver Broncos. Later Dale served two tours of duty in Vietnam with the United States Marine Corps.

Evans decided to study electrical engineering at the University of Kansas. His application was accepted, and he was offered a place starting in September 1951. His family had little money, so in order to pay for his college education he secured a scholarship from the Naval Reserve Officers Training Corps (NROTC). During the fraternities' rush week he joined the Sigma Nu fraternity. He earned extra money selling Chesterfield cigarettes, and had a cigarette vending machine installed in the Sigma Nu fraternity house. NROTC training involved a parade for one hour each week, and during the summer break there were midshipman cruises on warships. The first was on the battleship USS Wisconsin. In his sophomore year there was an introduction to naval aviation at Naval Air Station Corpus Christi in Texas. This experience inspired Evans to become a naval aviator. The third year cruise was to Europe on the USS Gwin, a destroyer minelayer. In his junior year he was elected to the Sigma Tau, Tau Beta Pi and Sigma Xi engineering honor societies. During his final summer break he worked in a glass factory to gain general engineering experience. He graduated with his Bachelor of Science degree in electrical engineering in June 1956.

== Navy ==
In a letter dated December 12, 1955, the Navy offered Evans a commission as an ensign and designated him a student aviator. He reported to Naval Air Station Pensacola in February 1956 for basic flight training in the Beechcraft T-34 Mentor, and made his first solo flight on May 21. He then progressed to the more powerful North American T-28 Trojan. His flight training then moved to Naval Outlying Landing Field Barin in Alabama, where student aviators practised landing on an aircraft carrier using an outline painted on the runway in the old North American T-6 Texan (known as the SNJ). Six actual landings were then made on the aircraft carrier USS Saipan. Evans returned to Topeka for Christmas leave. There he met Janet Merle (Jan) Pollom, who worked as a secretary at Forbes Air Force Base, and fell in love with her. On January 4, 1957, he reported to Naval Air Station Memphis, where he was taught instrument flying, culminating in a ground-controlled approach test. He then learned how to fly a jet aircraft, the Lockheed T-33 Shooting Star. In a ceremony on April 12 attended by Pollom, her mother, and Evans's mother, the chief of the Naval Air Technical Training Command, Rear Admiral Frank P. Akers handed out certificates to Evans's class designating them as naval aviators. Pollom pinned his aviator wings on his uniform.

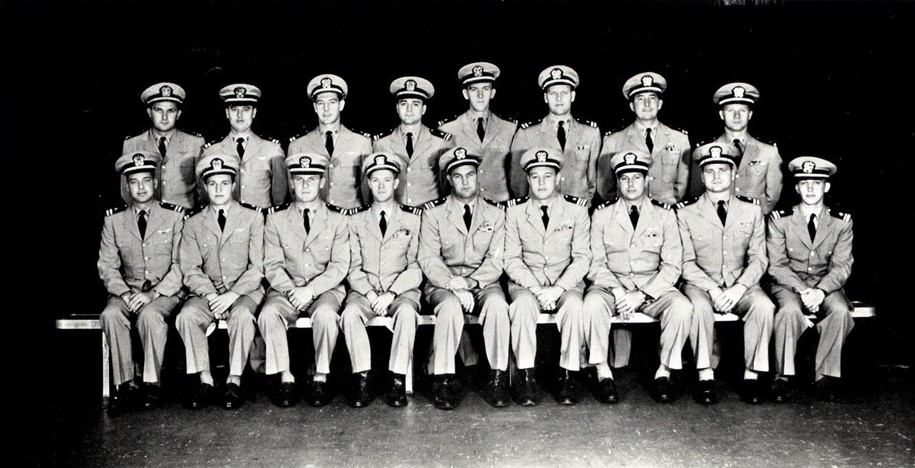
VF-142 group photo from the USS Ranger 1959 Western Pacific cruise. Evans is in the back row, fourth from the left.

Evans became a fighter pilot with Fighter Squadron 142 (VF-142), which was based at Naval Air Station Miramar in California, although it was still aboard the aircraft carrier USS Hornet when he arrived on July 14, 1957, and did not reach Miramar until July 25. The squadron was due to receive the new Vought F8U Crusader fighter, but these had not yet arrived, and in the meantime they flew the old North American FJ-3 Fury. He was promoted to the rank of lieutenant (junior grade), and married Pollom at the Westminster Presbyterian Church of Topeka on December 22, 1957. They had two children: a daughter, Jaime Dayle, and a son, Jon.

In January 1959, VF-142 boarded the brand new aircraft carrier USS Ranger, and set off on a cruise of the Western Pacific, which lasted until July 27, 1959. Afterwards, most of VF-142 was posted elsewhere, and Evans was one of the five pilots that remained. They took delivery of new model F8U Crusaders, and were joined by new pilots who had to be trained to fly them. The squadron was then assigned to the aircraft carrier USS Oriskany, which departed for a tour of the Western Pacific on May 14, and returned to San Diego on December 15. During the voyage, Evans completed correspondence coursework for promotion to lieutenant, and was promoted to that rank in June. With the completion of back to back deployments, he became a flight instructor for the F8U Crusader with Fighter Squadron 124 (VF-124), but until it moved to Miramar in June, he had to fly the Grumman F9F Cougar, although he was able to fly the F8U Crusader once a week or so to stay familiar with it.

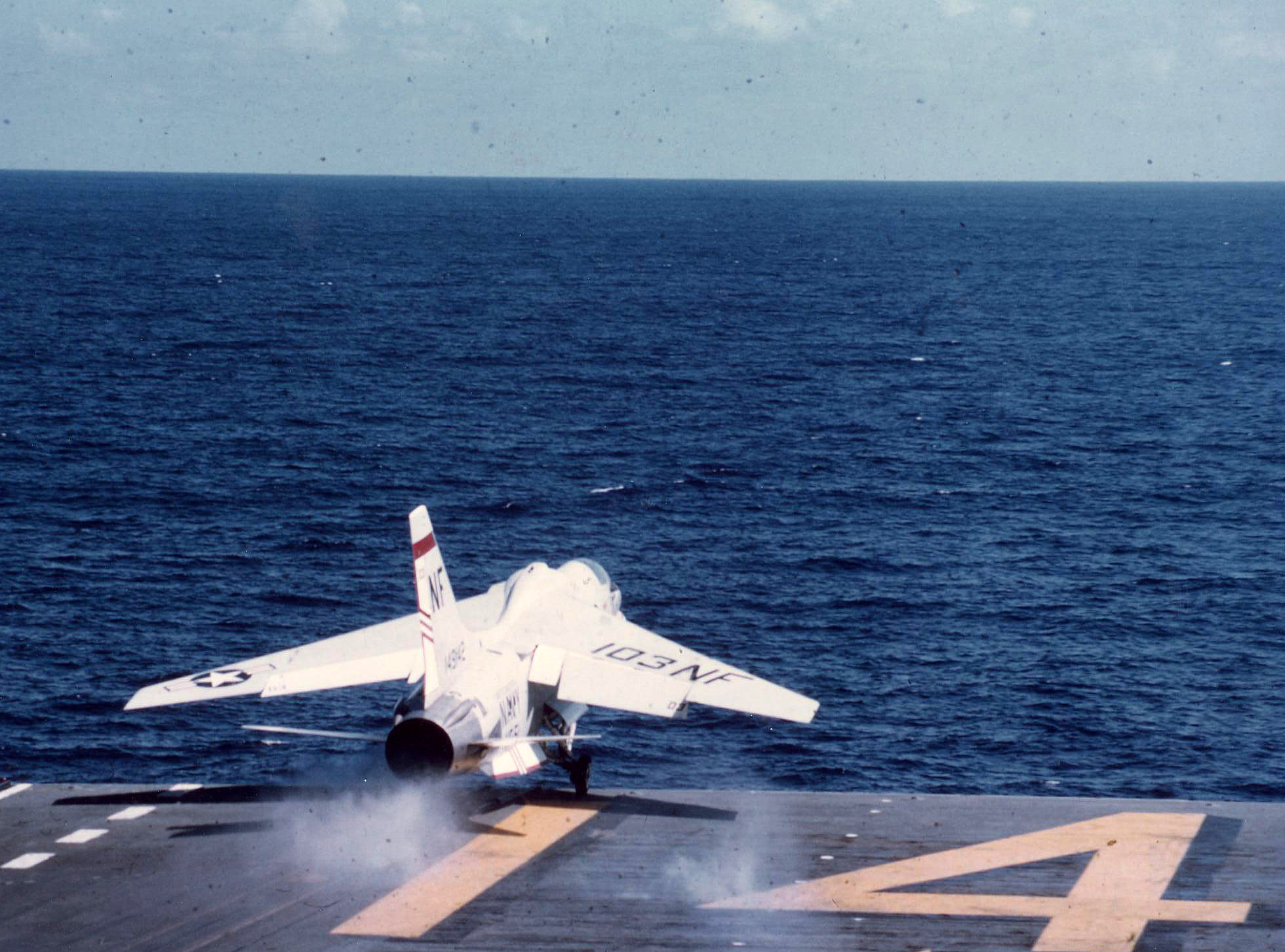
An F8U Crusader is launched from the USS Ticonderoga in July 1965.

In 1962, Evans entered the U.S. Naval Postgraduate School in Monterey, California. Fellow students there at the time included Robert H. Shumaker, Gene Cernan, Richard F. Gordon Jr., Paul J. Weitz and Jack Lousma. On June 5, 1963, the National Aeronautics and Space Administration (NASA) announced that it would be recruiting a new group of astronauts. Military applications were due by July 15. They were pre-screened by the services, and those that the Navy regarded as qualified were contacted and invited to apply. Evans was on leave in Topeka, and received this notification in the form of a telegram. He submitted the required paperwork on July 6. Cernan, Evans, Gordon and Shumaker were among the 34 finalists that NASA invited to undergo a week of medical and physiological tests at Brooks Air Force Base in San Antonio, Texas. Six were eliminated at this point; the remaining 28, including Evans, were invited to come to Houston, Texas for interviews and testing. On October 14, Cernan and Evans were both called out of class to take long-distance calls from NASA. For Cernan, it was a call from Deke Slayton, NASA's Director of Space Flight Operations, informing that he had been chosen; for Evans, it was one from Al Shepard, informing him that he had not. Evans returned to his studies. The Navy frowned on officers loafing while still drawing pay during the summer break, so the students had to take summer classes. Evans chose to take a course in Russian at the Defense Language Institute at the Presidio of Monterey. He graduated with a Master of Science degree in aeronautical engineering in 1964.

After two years ashore, Evans rejoined VF-124 to re-qualify for aircraft carrier duty. He was then assigned to Fighter Squadron 51 (VF-51), once again flying the F8U Crusader. The ship was already engaged in a combat tour of the Western Pacific on board the aircraft carrier USS Ticonderoga, an older sister ship of the Oriskany, so Evans was flown to Naval Air Station Cubi Point in the Philippines, where he collected an F8U Crusader that had been set aside for him, and flew out to the ship. The Ticonderoga returned to San Diego in December 1964. Evans was appointed the squadron maintenance officer, a position usually held by a lieutenant commander, and soon after received a spot promotion to that rank.

The Ticonderoga departed for its next Western Pacific cruise in September 1965, but this was not a normal peacetime cruise; the Ticonderoga was assigned to Dixie Station off the coast of South Vietnam, from whence aircraft carriers launched strikes in support of American and South Vietnamese troops engaged in combat operations in the Vietnam War. During a training exercise, Evans collided with his wingman, Lieutenant Roy E. Miller. Evans had to land at Tan Son Nhut Air Base because his aircraft was too badly damaged to be recovered by an aircraft carrier, and it had to be shipped back to the United States for repairs. It was seen by his wife, who recorded a duet of Side by Side with Miller's wife, adding to the ribbing Evans received from his shipmates. Within days he was flying combat missions over South Vietnam. Ordnance was in short supply, so in order to inflate the number of sorties flown, aircraft seldom carried full bomb loads. Evans's aircraft was holed by ground fire.

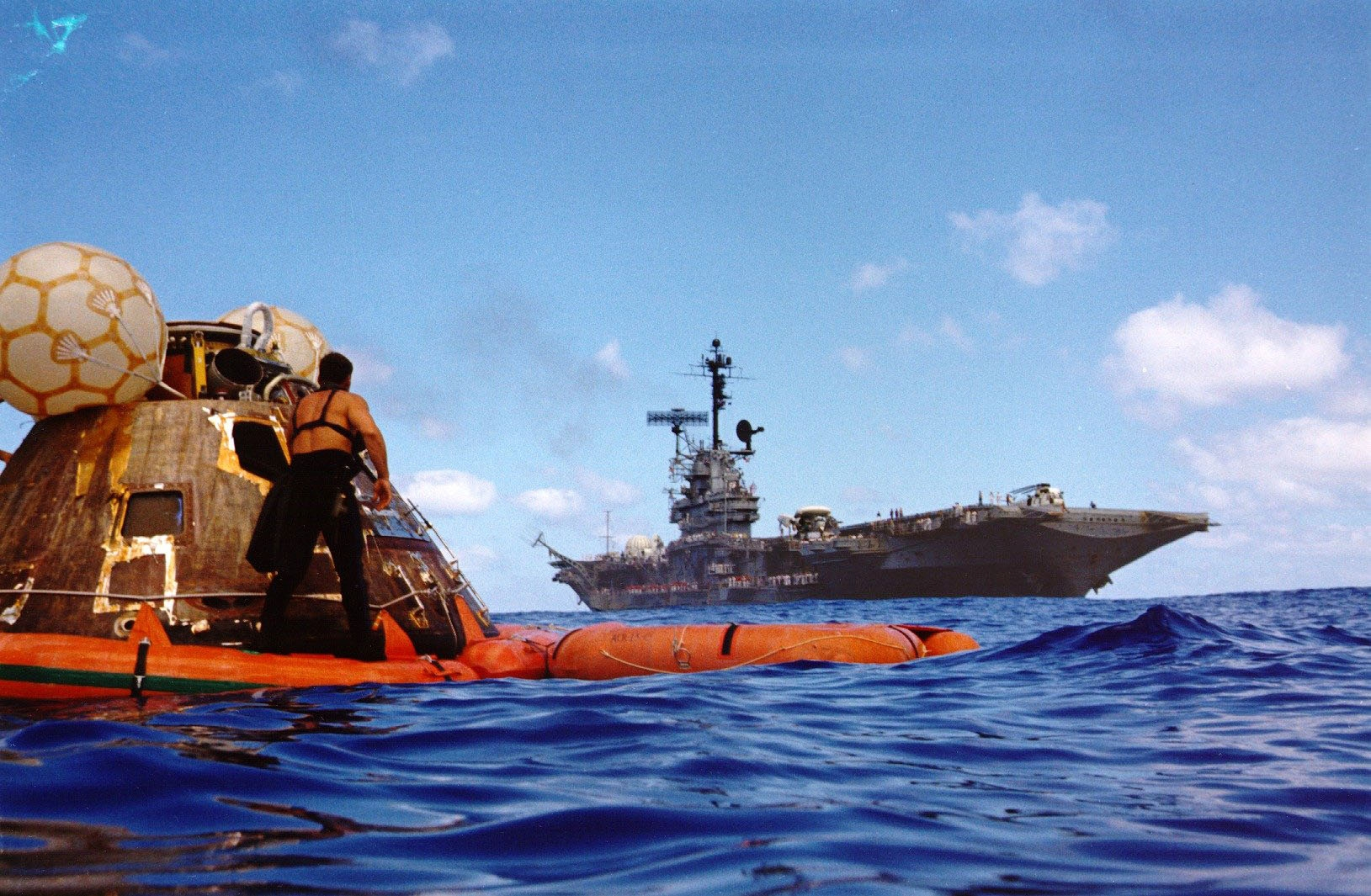
The USS Ticonderoga recovers the Apollo 17 spacecraft in 1972.

On September 10, 1965, NASA announced that it was recruiting another group of pilot astronauts. Once again, the Bureau of Naval Personnel (BUPERS) contacted Evans and asked if he wanted to volunteer, which he did. On November 12, a package of forms was received by his wife Jan in San Diego, with a cover letter that explained that BUPERS had recommended Evans to NASA. She contacted Slayton, and explained that Evans was on a deployment in the Western Pacific, and was unlikely to be able to return the forms before the December 1 deadline. Slayton reassured her that this would be taken into consideration. Evans managed to mail the forms on December 7. A few weeks later a letter arrived informing Evans that once again he had made the short list, and was invited to come to Brooks Air Force Base for another round of tests.

Ticonderoga was back on Dixie station by January 28, and Evans was flying attack missions against Viet Cong insurgents. On that day, his aircraft suffered an electrical failure and he was left with a bomb under his right wing that he was unable to jettison. This made it too dangerous to attempt a landing on the Ticonderoga, so he was ordered to proceed to Cam Ranh Air Force Base, Evans skidded on the wet Marston Mat runway and went 6.1 metres (20 ft) off its end. The bomb did not explode. Evans was taken to the office of the base commander, where a United States Air Force sergeant handed him orders to proceed to Texas for astronaut selection. Once again, Evans endured the battery of medical and psychological tests, and was chosen as one of the 35 finalists to be interviewed at the Rice Hotel. His temporary duty assignment only covered the tests, but BUPERS extended it to March 5, and then turned down his squadron commander's request for a replacement officer. As it happened, Evans did not miss much action, as the Ticonderoga departed Subic Bay in the Philippines for Sasebo, Japan, on February 17, but it was back on Dixie Station by March 6. Eleven days later, Evans participated in an attack on Viet Cong units that earned him a Navy Commendation Medal. On March 26, he received word that he had been selected for astronaut training. He was one of the nineteen astronauts selected by NASA in April 1966.

Evans completed a seven-month tour of duty flying combat missions. In his Navy service, Evans had logged 2,084 hours of flight time, including 4,600 hours in jet aircraft. He had flown 112 combat missions. In a ceremony on the Ticonderoga's flight deck on April 1, he was awarded gold 5/16 inch stars in lieu of his second, third, fourth and fifth Air Medals. He flew his last mission, a combat air patrol, on April 21.

== NASA ==
=== Support crew ===
The Ticonderoga left Dixie station on April 21, 1966, and returned to San Diego on May 16. Evans preceded it, after taking a mail plane to the Philippines, and then a Military Air Transport Service flight to San Diego, which he reached on April 28. He then took a flight to Houston on May 1. The family remained in San Diego until his daughter Jaime finished her school year in late May. In the meantime Evans and Jan bought a four-bedroom house in El Lago, Texas. It was newly built, with no furniture, and the electricity and telephone still to be connected. The family set out for Houston on June 6, taking four days to make the journey in their Rambler station wagon. As their furniture had not yet arrived, they initially stayed in quarters at Ellington Air Force Base. The family was finally able to move in on July 6. Evans's Navy Commendation Medal citation was forwarded to NASA, and the medal was presented to him, along with a silver 5/16 inch star in lieu of his sixth Air Medal and gold 5/16 inch stars in lieu of his seventh and eighth, by Robert Gilruth, the director of NASA's Manned Spacecraft Center.

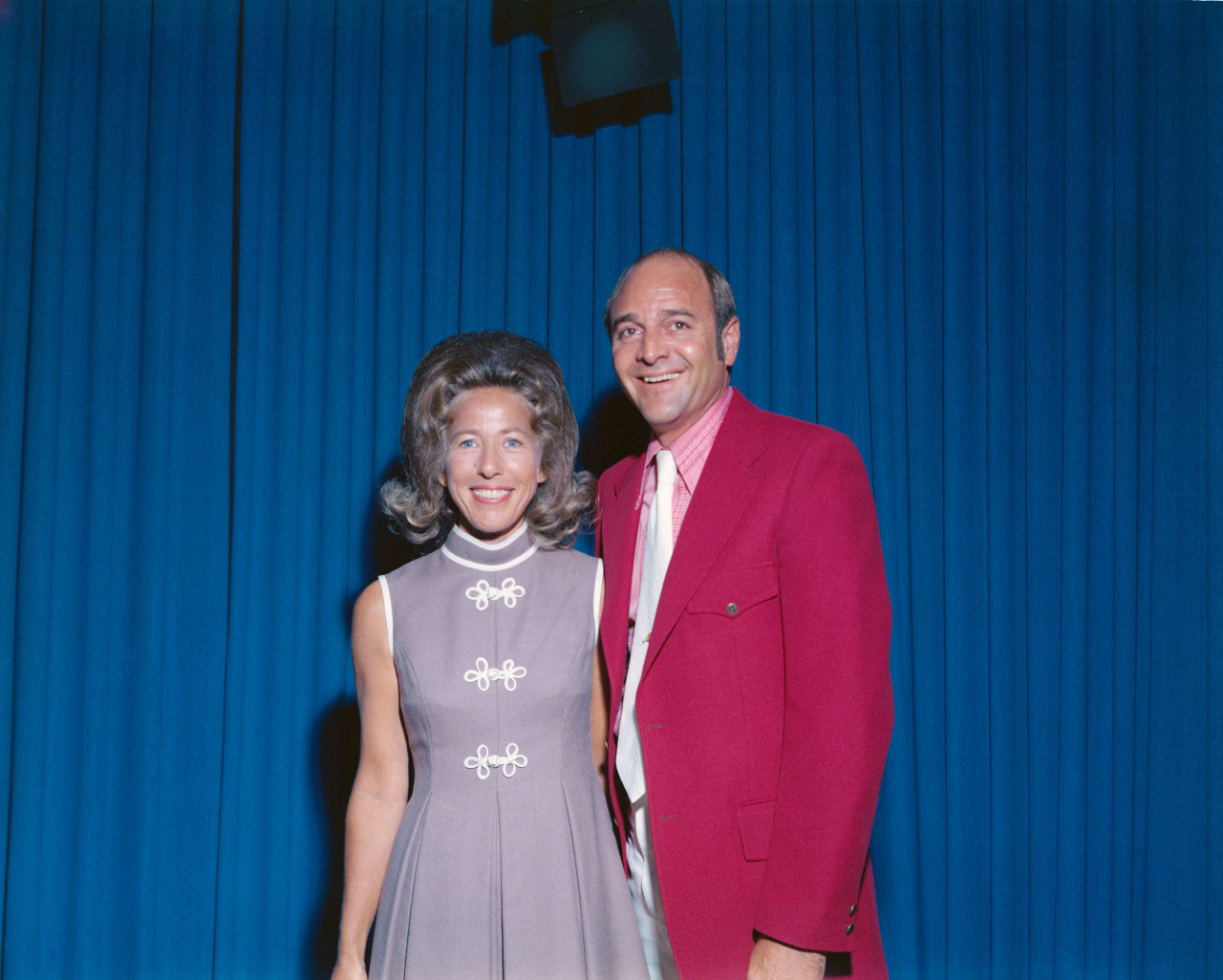
With his wife Jan in 1972

In earlier astronaut groups, the senior astronaut had assumed the role of command module pilot (CMP) while the more junior was the lunar module pilot (LMP), but the nineteen in this group were divided into Command/Service Module (CSM) and Lunar Module (LM) specialists. Slayton asked each of them which speciality he preferred, but made the final decision himself. This early division of assignments would have a profound effect on their subsequent careers. Evans became a CSM specialist. He was chosen as a member of the support crew for Apollo 1, the first crewed Project Apollo mission, along with Ed Givens and Jack Swigert, two fellow members of his astronaut group. The astronauts assigned to this duty regarded it as the lowest rung on the ladder. Usually low in seniority, they assembled the mission's rules, flight plan, and checklists, and kept them updated, and worked in the simulators developing procedures, especially those for emergency situations. They also stood by during spacecraft tests on the launch pad, and set up the cockpit, ensuring that all the switches were in the right positions. In this role, Evans worked inside the Apollo spacecraft for a couple of hours on January 26, 1967. The support crew then flew back to Houston. On landing at Ellington Air Force Base they were informed that the prime crew had died in a fire inside the spacecraft.

When planning for Apollo missions resumed, Evans, Givens and Swigert were assigned to the support crew of Apollo 7, which would now be the first crewed flight. Givens was killed in a motor vehicle accident on June 6, 1967, and was replaced on the support crew by Bill Pogue. Evans was subsequently a member of the support crew for Apollo 11, the first Moon landing, and he was a capsule communicator (CAPCOM) for Apollo 7, Apollo 11 and Apollo 14.

=== Backup crew ===
Under the rotation scheme developed by Slayton, the role of backup commander (CDR) for Apollo 13 would have been John Young, the CMP of Apollo 10, and that of Apollo 14 would have been the CMP of Apollo 11, Michael Collins. They would then become the prime crew CDRs of Apollo 16 and Apollo 17 respectively. However, Cernan baulked at reprising his role as LMP with Young, holding out for his own mission. This became available when Collins declined the opportunity to lead a mission to the Moon. Cernan was therefore selected as backup CDR of Apollo 14 in his stead. This was fortunate for Evans as well; Slayton consulted with Cernan about the selection of the rest of his Apollo 14 backup crew, and they chose Evans as CMP and Joe Engle as LMP. The prime crew for Apollo 14 would be Alan Shepard, the Chief of the Astronaut Office as CDR, Edgar Mitchell as LMP and Stu Roosa as CMP. Evans's selection as a member of the Apollo 14 backup crew was formally announced by NASA on August 6, 1969. He was still a serving naval officer, and on October 1, 1969, was promoted to commander.

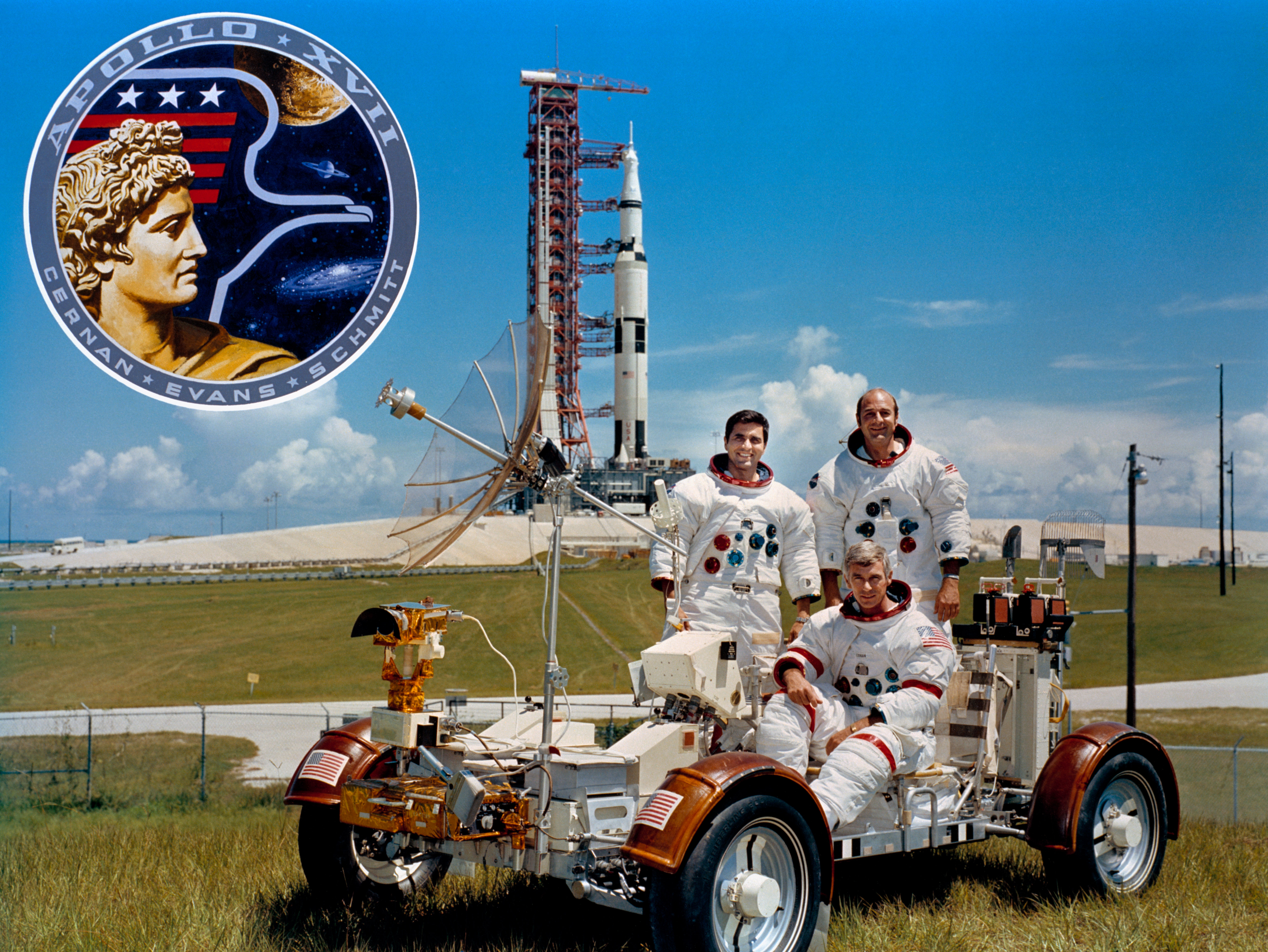
The prime crew of Apollo 17: Gene Cernan (seated), Evans (standing on right), and Harrison H. Schmitt

That the backup crew of Apollo 14 would in due course become the prime crew of Apollo 17 as per the rotation scheme was far from certain. The absence of science astronauts on the prime or backup crews of Apollo 13 and Apollo 14 caused adverse reaction in the media, and there was pressure from the scientific community to send a scientist to the Moon. When Slayton announced the crew for Apollo 15 on March 26, 1970, geologist astronaut Harrison Schmitt was named as backup LMP, with Vance Brand as backup CMP and Richard Gordon as backup CDR. Under the rotation scheme, they could expect to become the prime crew for Apollo 18.

When Apollo 18 was cancelled in September 1970, the scientific community pressed NASA to assign Schmitt, a geologist, to Apollo 17 rather than a pilot with non-professional geological training. This left Slayton with the question of who would fill the two other Apollo 17 slots: the rest of the Apollo 15 backup crew or the Apollo 14 backup crew (except for Engle). Gordon's crew's experience as backup to Apollo 15 was more relevant for the proposed Apollo 17 mission, as Apollo 15 was a similar J-class mission using the Extended Lunar Module, capable of three-day stays on the Moon, and carrying the Lunar Roving Vehicle. Nor was support for assigning Cernan to Apollo 17 unanimous within NASA; Tom Stafford, the acting chief of the Astronaut office with Shepard assigned to Apollo 14, strongly supported Cernan, with whom he had flown on Gemini 9A and Apollo 10, as did Shepard; but Gordon was supported by James McDivitt, the manager of the Apollo Spacecraft Program Office, and Pete Conrad, who was Gordon's CDR on Apollo 12. Cernan crashed a Bell 47G helicopter into the Indian River near Cape Canaveral during a training exercise in January 1971; the accident was attributed to pilot error, as Cernan had misjudged his altitude before crashing into the water. Slayton dismissed concerns about Cernan's judgment. After being offered command of the mission, Cernan objected to Engle's omission from the crew, but acquiesced when it became clear that Schmitt would fly on Apollo 17 with or without Cernan. The fate of the CMP was tied to that of his CDR.

The prime crew of Apollo 17 was publicly announced on August 13, 1971. The original backup crew for Apollo 17, announced at the same time, was the crew of Apollo 15: David Scott as CDR, Alfred Worden as CMP and James Irwin as LMP; but they were removed because of their roles in the Apollo 15 postal covers incident. On May 23, 1972, they were replaced with Young and Duke from the crew of Apollo 16, as backup CDR and LMP respectively, and Roosa from Apollo 14 as backup CMP. Thus, Evans served as Roosa's backup on Apollo 14, and Roosa as Evans's backup on Apollo 17. The two men studied geology with Farouk El-Baz, often on their own time. They became close friends. They would talk about the Moon and the mission at length, and often end with a few beers. Their training was directed at developing the ability to make observations and take photographs of features from orbit. They would fly over geological features in NASA Northrop T-38 Talon jets and tape record their observations and take photographs. These would then be critiqued by geologists. Farouk sometimes flew with Evans or Roosa in the T-38s or small United States Geological Survey aircraft.

=== Apollo 17, prime crew ===
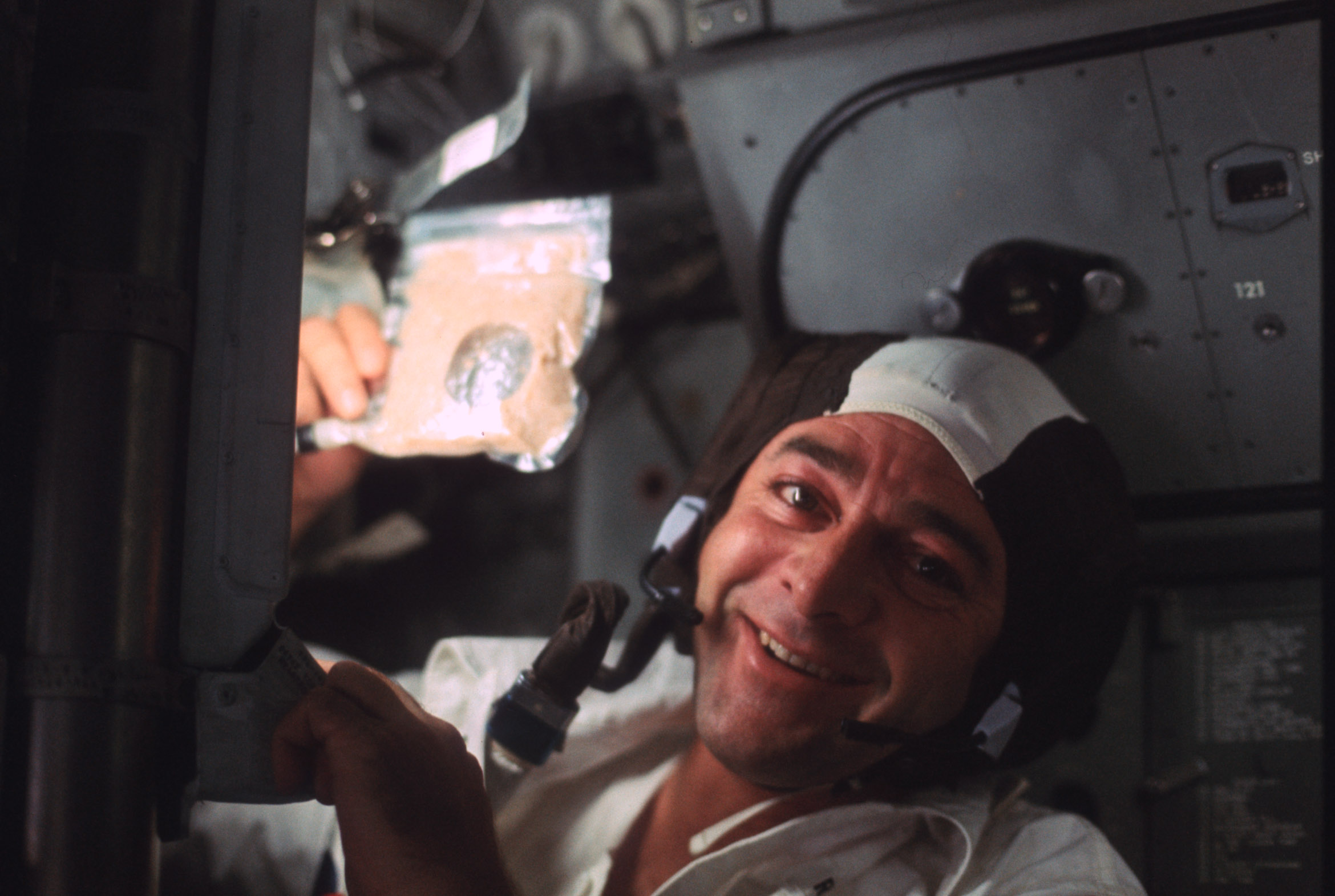
Evans on Apollo 17

While suited up for the Apollo 17 mission, but before his helmet was attached, Evans smoked a last cigarette. His crewmates had urged him to quit, and Schmitt suggested that he could take advantage of the two-week mission to go cold turkey. An estimated 700,000 people watched the night launch from the Kennedy Space Center, the largest crowd of spectators since Apollo 11. The flight plan kept Evans busy, making him so tired he overslept one morning by an hour, despite the efforts of Mission Control to awaken him. Before the LM departed for the lunar surface, he had discovered that he had misplaced his pair of scissors, necessary to open food packets. Cernan and Schmitt lent him one of theirs. While Cernan and Schmitt landed on the Moon and explored the Taurus–Littrow valley, Evans remained in lunar orbit on board the Command Module America, completing assigned work tasks which required visual geological observations, hand-held photography of specific targets, and the control of cameras and other highly sophisticated scientific equipment carried in the service module's SIM bay. Cernan and Schmitt referred to Evans as "Captain America", after the comic book character.

The orbit of the CSM having been modified to an elliptical orbit in preparation for the LM's departure and eventual descent, one of Evans's first solo tasks in the CSM was to circularize its orbit such that the CSM would remain at approximately the same distance above the surface throughout its orbit. Thereafter, he observed ten visual targets that had been assigned prior to launch, all of which were successfully identified during the course of the mission. He focused on surface features as well as the solar corona at "sunrise," or the period of time during which the CSM would pass from the darkened portion of the Moon to the illuminated portion when the Moon itself mostly obscured the Sun. To photograph portions of the surface that were not illuminated by the sun while Evans passed over them, Evans relied in conjunction on exposure and Earthlight. Evans photographed such features as the craters Eratosthenes and Copernicus, as well as the vicinity of Mare Orientale, using this technique. According to the Apollo 17 Mission Report, Evans was able to capture all scientific photographic targets, as well as some other targets of interest.

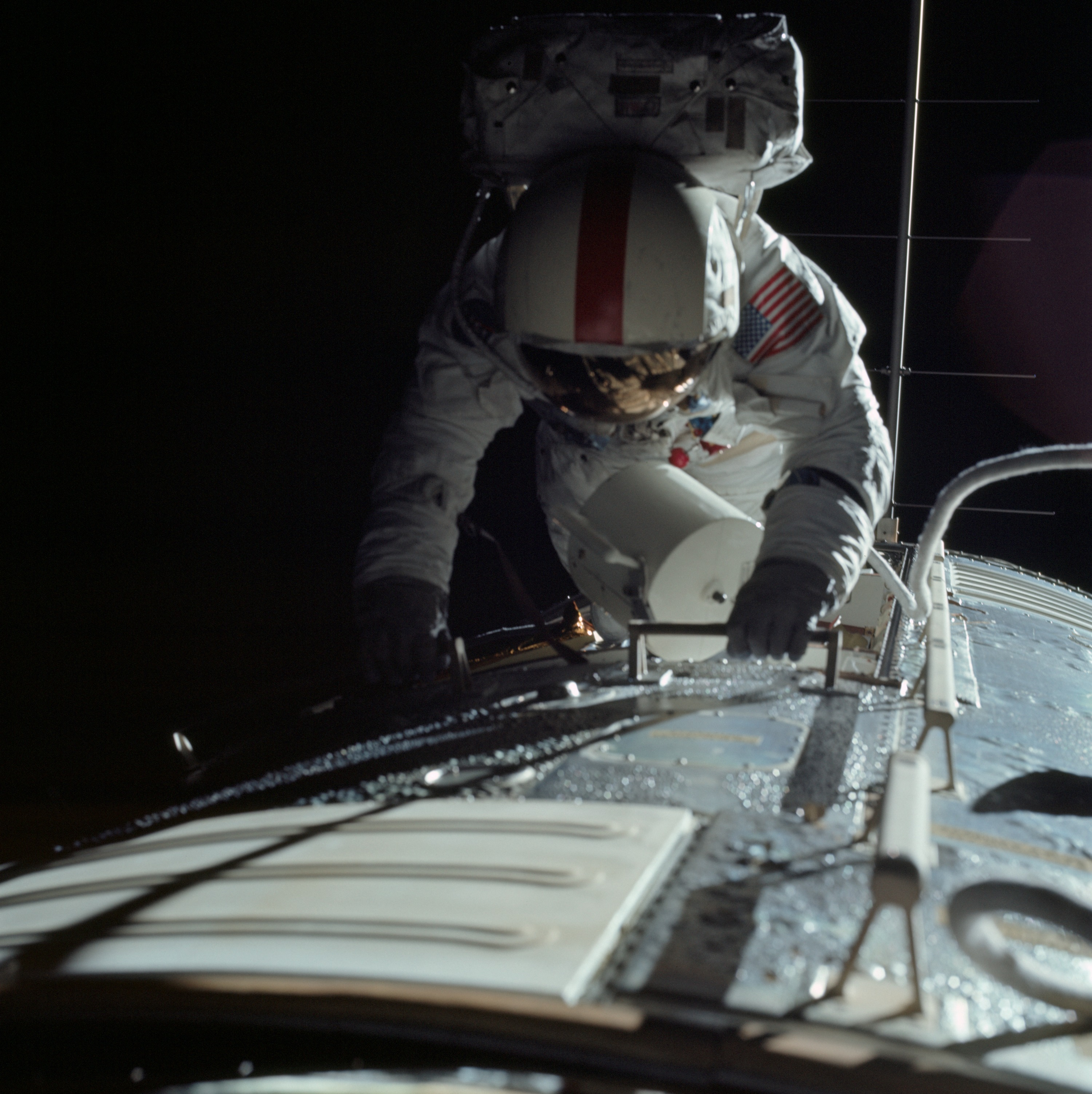
Evans during his trans-Earth EVA on Apollo 17

The instruments in the SIM bay functioned without significant hindrance during the orbital portion of the mission, though the two antennas of the lunar sounder as well as the mapping camera encountered minor issues. The indicator on the instrument panel for the extension of one of the sounder's antennas was not functional and the second antenna suffered an apparent stall during its extension. Despite these technical difficulties, both antennas were deployed fully and the sounder achieved its planned observational purpose. Similarly, the extension and retraction of the mapping camera took longer than planned (about four minutes, longer than the nominal two) and, though deployment and retraction was not otherwise hindered, the use of this piece of equipment was reduced to avoid exhausting it by overuse.

Evans was also responsible for piloting the CSM during the orbital phase of the mission, maneuvering the spacecraft to alter and maintain its orbital trajectory. In addition to the initial orbital recircularization maneuver shortly after the LM's departure, one of the final significant solo activities Evans performed in the CSM in preparation for the return of his crewmates from the lunar surface was the plane change maneuver. This maneuver was meant to align the CSM's trajectory to the eventual trajectory of the LM to facilitate rendezvous in orbit. Evans fired the SPS engine of the CSM for about 20 seconds in successfully adjusting the CSM's orbital plane. He holds the record of most time spent in lunar orbit: 147 hours, 43 minutes and 37.11 seconds.

Hot diggety dog!

— Evans, upon taking his first steps in space.

On the way back to Earth, Evans completed a one-hour, five-minute, 44-second extravehicular activity, during which he made three trips to the scientific instrument module (SIM) bay to retrieve lunar sounder film, the panoramic camera, and three camera mapping cassettes, and completed a personal inspection of the equipment bay area. For this Evans donned Cernan's lunar visor assembly with its red stripe, and the top part of his lunar backpack. He set up the movie camera and TV camera to record the EVA, allowing it to be televised live. After a flight of 301 hours, 51 minutes and 59 seconds, America splashed down in the Pacific Ocean, where it was retrieved by the Ticonderoga. To the dismay of his Apollo 17 crewmates, the first thing that Evans did when he got on board was ask one of the crew for a cigarette.

Astronauts normally received a spot promotion on the successful completion of a mission; Evans's promotion to captain was made official in January 1973. He received his Navy astronaut wings from John Warner, the United States Secretary of the Navy. The Apollo 17 crew were fêted at parties and receptions. They were driven around the Los Angeles Memorial Coliseum at Super Bowl VII, they met Elvis Presley in Las Vegas and were hosted by President Richard Nixon at the White House and Camp David. Cernan and Evans refused to meet with Muhammad Ali because of the boxer's 1967 refusal to serve in the U.S. armed forces, but accepted hospitality from Frank Sinatra.

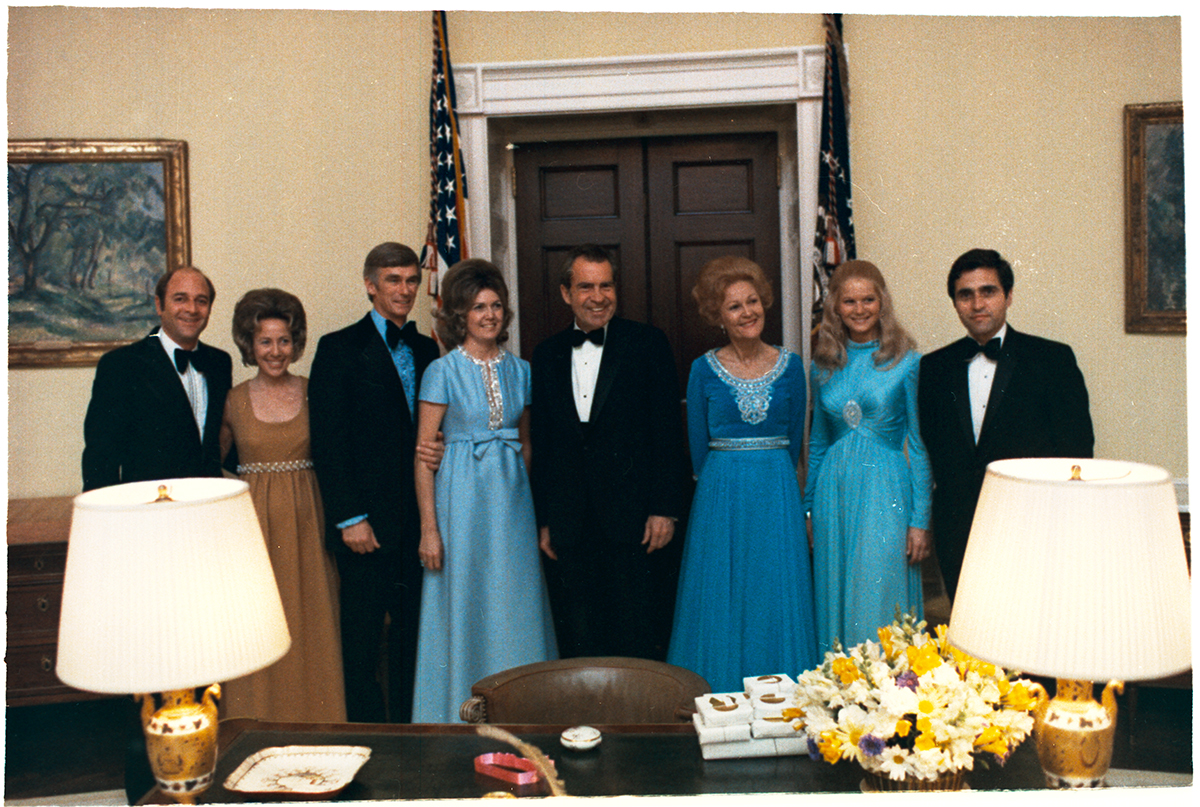
Evans and his wife Jan (left) visit the White House with President Richard Nixon, Gene Cernan, Harrison Schmitt and their partners.

Evans was later backup CMP for the 1975 Apollo–Soyuz Test Project (ASTP) mission. The Russian he had learned years before came in handy, but was limited. Asked to give a speech at a cosmonauts' dinner event, he recited Humpty Dumpty in Russian, which his hosts found hilarious. Evans retired from the U.S. Navy as captain on April 30, 1976, with 21 years of service, but remained active as a NASA astronaut involved in the development of NASA's Space Shuttle program. He served as a member of the operations and training group within the Astronaut Office, responsible for launch and ascent phases of the Space Shuttle program. He retired from NASA on March 8, 1977.

== Later years ==
Jan's parents had retired to live in Sun City, Arizona, and Jan was eager to move to nearby Scottsdale, Arizona, so Evans looked for a job there. A chance encounter led to an offer to become the director of marketing at the Scottsdale-based Western America Energy Corporation. Evans soon became disillusioned with the company and the industry and quit. He then found a position with Sperry Flight Systems, which made electronic components and cockpit instrumentation for the Space Shuttle, as its Director of Space Systems Marketing. But the president of the company who had brought him in died, and Evans had a falling out with his successor. He left to form his own consulting company, and formed a lucrative partnership with a Japanese entrepreneur who was building a theme park devoted to space exploration.

Evans died in his sleep of a heart attack at his home in Scottsdale on April 6, 1990, at the age of 56. He was buried at the Valley Presbyterian Church Memorial Garden in Paradise Valley, Arizona, where Jan would leave a red rose on the anniversaries of his birth, marriage, spaceflight and death.

== Awards and honors ==
Evans was awarded the NASA Distinguished Service Medal in 1973, the Johnson Space Center Superior Achievement Award in 1970, the Navy Distinguished Service Medal in 1973, Navy Astronaut Wings, eight Air Medals, the Vietnam Service Medal, and the Navy Commendation Medal with combat distinguishing service. He received a University of Kansas Distinguished Service Citation in 1973, and was named Kansan of the Year in 1972. He was inducted into the International Space Hall of Fame in 1983, and the U.S. Astronaut Hall of Fame on October 4, 1997.

== See also ==
- The Blue Marble
- List of spaceflight records
- Nu Chapter Commander (KU-1956)
