= 1982 Missouri Tigers football team =

American college football season

1982 Missouri Tigers football
- Conference: Big Eight Conference
- Record: 5–4–2 (2–3–2 Big 8)
- Head coach: Warren Powers (5th season)
- Defensive coordinator: Carl Reese (6th season)
- Home stadium: Faurot Field

1982 Big Eight Conference football standings
	Conf.					Overall
Team	W		L		T	W		L		T
No. 3 Nebraska $	7	–	0	–	0	12	–	1	–	0
No. 16 Oklahoma	6	–	1	–	0	8	–	4	–	0
Oklahoma State	3	–	2	–	2	4	–	5	–	2
Kansas State	3	–	3	–	1	6	–	5	–	1
Missouri	2	–	3	–	2	5	–	4	–	2
Iowa State	1	–	5	–	1	4	–	6	–	1
Kansas	1	–	5	–	1	2	–	7	–	2
Colorado	1	–	5	–	1	2	–	8	–	1
$ – Conference champion; Rankings from AP Poll

The 1982 Missouri Tigers football team was an American football team that represented the University of Missouri in the Big Eight Conference (Big 8) during the 1982 NCAA Division I-A football season. The team compiled a 5–4–2 record (2–3–2 against Big 8 opponents), finished in fifth place in the Big 8, and outscored its opponents by a combined total of 207 to 196. Warren Powers was the head coach for the fifth of seven seasons. The team played its home games at Faurot Field in Columbia, Missouri.

The team's statistical leaders included Tracey Mack with 484 rushing yards, Marlon Adler with 1,242 passing yards, and James Caver with 634 receiving yards.

== Schedule ==
Date	Time	Opponent	Site	Result	Attendance	Source
September 4		Colorado State*	Faurot Field; Columbia, MO	W 28–14	50,015	
September 11	1:31 p.m.	Army*	Faurot Field; Columbia, MO	W 23–10	50,233	
September 25		at No. 17 Texas*	Texas Memorial Stadium; Austin, TX	L 0–21	76,438	
October 2		East Carolina*	Faurot Field; Columbia, MO	W 28–9	50,848	
October 9		at Kansas State	KSU Stadium; Manhattan, KS	T 7–7	30,450	
October 16		Iowa State	Faurot Field; Columbia, MO (rivalry)	T 17–17	66,133	
October 23		at No. 5 Nebraska	Memorial Stadium; Lincoln, NE (Victory Bell)	L 19–23	76,406	
October 30		at Oklahoma State	Lewis Field; Stillwater, OK	L 20–30	38,400	
November 6		Colorado	Faurot Field; Columbia, MO	W 35–14	46,312	
November 13		at No. 15 Oklahoma	Oklahoma Memorial Stadium; Norman, OK (rivalry)	L 14–41	75,960	
November 20		Kansas	Faurot Field; Columbia, MO (Border War)	W 16–10	49,041	
*Non-conference game; Rankings from AP Poll released prior to the game; All times are in Central time
