= 1982 Kansas Jayhawks football team =

American college football season

1982 Kansas Jayhawks football
- Conference: Big Eight Conference
- Record: 2–7–2 (1–5–1 Big 8)
- Head coach: Don Fambrough (8th season)
- Captains: Tim Friess; Russ Bastin; Gary Coleman; Paul Fairchild
- Home stadium: Memorial Stadium

1982 Big Eight Conference football standings
	Conf.					Overall
Team	W		L		T	W		L		T
No. 3 Nebraska $	7	–	0	–	0	12	–	1	–	0
No. 16 Oklahoma	6	–	1	–	0	8	–	4	–	0
Oklahoma State	3	–	2	–	2	4	–	5	–	2
Kansas State	3	–	3	–	1	6	–	5	–	1
Missouri	2	–	3	–	2	5	–	4	–	2
Iowa State	1	–	5	–	1	4	–	6	–	1
Kansas	1	–	5	–	1	2	–	7	–	2
Colorado	1	–	5	–	1	2	–	8	–	1
$ – Conference champion; Rankings from AP Poll

The 1982 Kansas Jayhawks football team represented the University of Kansas in the Big Eight Conference during the 1982 NCAA Division I-A football season. In their eighth and final season under head coach Don Fambrough, the Jayhawks compiled a 2–7–2 record (1–5–1 against conference opponents), finished in seventh place in the conference, and were outscored by opponents by a combined total of 276 to 150. They played their home games at Memorial Stadium in Lawrence, Kansas.

The team's statistical leaders included Frank Seurer with 1,625 passing yards, Dino Bell with 370 rushing yards, and Bob Johnson with 428 receiving yards. Tim Friess, Russ Bastin, Gary Coleman, and Paul Fairchild were the team captains.

== Schedule ==
Date	Time	Opponent	Site	Result	Attendance	Source
September 11	1:30 p.m.	Wichita State*	Memorial Stadium; Lawrence, KS	L 10–13	41,500	
September 18		TCU*	Memorial Stadium; Lawrence, KS	W 30–19	30,500	
September 25		at Kentucky*	Commonwealth Stadium; Lexington, KY	T 13–13	55,320	
October 2		Tulsa*	Memorial Stadium; Lawrence, KS	L 15–20	35,552	
October 9		at Oklahoma State	Lewis Field; Stillwater, OK	T 24–24	43,400	
October 16		Oklahoma	Memorial Stadium; Lawrence, KS	L 14–38	36,230	
October 23		at Kansas State	KSU Stadium; Manhattan, KS (rivalry)	L 7–36	45,595	
October 30		No. 6 Nebraska	Memorial Stadium; Lawrence, KS (rivalry)	L 0–52	51,172	
November 6		Iowa State	Memorial Stadium; Lawrence, KS	W 24–17	26,796	
November 13		at Colorado	Folsom Field; Boulder, CO	L 3–28	35,114	
November 20		at Missouri	Faurot Field; Columbia, MO (Border War)	L 10–16	49,041	
*Non-conference game; Rankings from AP Poll released prior to the game; All times are in Central time

== Roster ==
1982 Kansas Jayhawks football team roster
Players
Coaches
Offense

Pos.	#	Name	Class
TE	80	Sylvester Byrd	Fr
WR	20	Wayne Capers	Sr
G	69	Paul Fairchild	Sr
WR	88	Bobby Johnson	Sr
FB	39	E. J. Jones	Jr
QB	10	Frank Seurer	Jr
OT	76	Reggie Smith	Jr

Defense

Pos.	#	Name	Class
CB	33	Jeff Colter	Sr
CB	32	Elvis Patterson	Jr

Special teams

Pos.	#	Name	Class
P	8	Bucky Scribner	Sr

Head coach

- Don Fambrough (8th year)

Coordinators/assistant coaches

Legend

- (C) Team captain
- (S) Suspended
- (I) Ineligible
- Injured
- Redshirt
