= 1982 Iowa State Cyclones football team =

American college football season

1982 Iowa State Cyclones football
- Conference: Big Eight Conference
- Record: 4–6–1 (1–5–1 Big 8)
- Head coach: Donnie Duncan (4th season)
- Home stadium: Cylcone Stadium

1982 Big Eight Conference football standings
| | Conf. | | | | | Overall |
| Team | W | | L | | T | W | | L | | T |
|---|---|---|---|---|---|---|---|---|---|---|
| No. 3 Nebraska $ | 7 | – | 0 | – | 0 | 12 | – | 1 | – | 0 |
| No. 16 Oklahoma | 6 | – | 1 | – | 0 | 8 | – | 4 | – | 0 |
| Oklahoma State | 3 | – | 2 | – | 2 | 4 | – | 5 | – | 2 |
| Kansas State | 3 | – | 3 | – | 1 | 6 | – | 5 | – | 1 |
| Missouri | 2 | – | 3 | – | 2 | 5 | – | 4 | – | 2 |
| Iowa State | 1 | – | 5 | – | 1 | 4 | – | 6 | – | 1 |
| Kansas | 1 | – | 5 | – | 1 | 2 | – | 7 | – | 2 |
| Colorado | 1 | – | 5 | – | 1 | 2 | – | 8 | – | 1 |
$ – Conference champion; Rankings from AP Poll

The 1982 Iowa State Cyclones football team represented Iowa State University as a member of the Big Eight Conference during the 1982 NCAA Division I-A football season. Led by Donnie Duncan in his fourth and final season as head coach, the Cyclones compiled an overall record of 4–6–1 with a mark of 1–5–1 in conference play, placing sixth in the Big 8. Iowa State played home games at Cylcone Stadium in Ames, Iowa.

== Schedule ==
| Date | Time | Opponent | Site | TV | Result | Attendance | Source |
|---|---|---|---|---|---|---|---|
| September 11 | 6:30 pm | at Tennessee* | Neyland Stadium; Knoxville, TN | CTN (delay) | L 21–23 | 90,901 | |
| September 18 | 1:05 pm | at Iowa* | Kinnick Stadium; Iowa City, IA (rivalry) | WOI | W 19–7 | 59,605 | |
| September 25 | 1:30 pm | Drake* | Cylcone Stadium; Ames, IA | CTN (delay) | W 35–10 | 51,866 | |
| October 2 | 1:30 pm | Oklahoma | Cyclone Stadium; Ames, IA | CTN (delay) | L 3–13 | 52,770 | |
| October 9 | 1:30 pm | Kent State* | Cyclone Stadium; Ames, IA | CTN (delay) | W 44–7 | 49,930 | |
| October 16 | 1:30 pm | at Missouri | Faurot Field; Columbia, MO (rivalry) | CTN (delay) | T 17–17 | 66,133 | |
| October 23 | 2:30 pm | at Colorado | Folsom Field; Boulder, CO | CTN (delay) | W 31–14 | 40,581 | |
| October 30 | 1:30 pm | Kansas State^{†} | Cyclone Stadium; Ames, IA (rivalry) | CTN (delay) | L 3–9 | 52,078 | |
| November 6 | 1:30 pm | at Kansas | Memorial Stadium; Lawrence, KS | CTN (delay) | L 17–24 | 26,796 | |
| November 13 | 1:30 pm | No. 7 Nebraska | Cyclone Stadium; Ames, IA (rivalry) | CTN (delay) | L 10–48 | 52,887 | |
| November 20 | 1:30 pm | at Oklahoma State | Lewis Field; Stillwater, OK | CTN (delay) | L 13–49 | 40,200 | |
*Non-conference game; ^{†}Homecoming; Rankings from AP Poll released prior to the game; All times are in Central time

== Game summaries ==
=== Iowa State ===
Iowa State at Iowa

| Team | 1 | 2 | 3 | 4 | Total |
|---|---|---|---|---|---|
| • Cyclones | 0 | 3 | 3 | 13 | 19 |
| Hawkeyes | 7 | 0 | 0 | 0 | 7 |

- Date: September 18
- Location: Kinnick Stadium, Iowa City, IA
- Game start: 1:10 p.m. CDT
- Elapsed time: 2:27
- Game attendance: 59,605
- Game weather: 65 °F (18 °C), Clear and sunny, Wind NW 12 mph (19 km/h)
- Referee: Jerry Hendrickson

Scoring summary
| Q1 | 7:18 | IOWA | Wancket 26-yard interception return (Nichol kick) | IOWA 7–0 |
| Q2 | 12:31 | ISU | Giffords 26-yard field goal | IOWA 7–3 |
| Q3 | 5:06 | ISU | Giffords 32-yard field goal | IOWA 7–6 |
| Q4 | 12:49 | ISU | Giffords 25-yard field goal | ISU 9–7 |
| Q4 | 11:06 | ISU | Giffords 24-yard field goal | IOWA 31–7 |
| Q4 | 7:33 | ISU | Leaks 46-yard pass from Archer (Giffords kick) | ISU 19–7 |

== Roster ==
1982 Iowa State Cyclones football team roster
| Players | | | Coaches |
|---|---|---|---|
| Offense: Pos. / # / Name / Class; OT / 69 / Karl Nelson / Sr | Defense: Pos. / # / Name / Class; LB / / Jay Niemann / Sr | Special teams: Pos. / # / Name / Class; K / 6 / Alex Giffords / Sr | Head coach: Donnie Duncan; Coordinators/assistant coaches Legend: (C) Team captain; (S) Suspended; (I) Ineligible; Injured; Redshirt |

== Team players in the 1983 NFL draft ==
| Player | Position | Round | Pick | NFL club |
| Karl Nelson | Offensive tackle | 3 | 70 | New York Giants |
