= 1982 Oklahoma Sooners football team =

American college football season

1982 Oklahoma Sooners football

Fiesta Bowl, L 21–32 vs. Arizona State
- Conference: Big Eight Conference

Ranking
- Coaches: No. 16
- AP: No. 16
- Record: 8–4 (6–1 Big 8)
- Head coach: Barry Switzer (10th season)
- Offensive coordinator: Galen Hall (10th season)
- Offensive scheme: Wishbone
- Defensive coordinator: Gary Gibbs (2nd season)
- Base defense: 5–2
- Captain: game captains
- Home stadium: Oklahoma Memorial Stadium

1982 Big Eight Conference football standings
	Conf.					Overall
Team	W		L		T	W		L		T
No. 3 Nebraska $	7	–	0	–	0	12	–	1	–	0
No. 16 Oklahoma	6	–	1	–	0	8	–	4	–	0
Oklahoma State	3	–	2	–	2	4	–	5	–	2
Kansas State	3	–	3	–	1	6	–	5	–	1
Missouri	2	–	3	–	2	5	–	4	–	2
Iowa State	1	–	5	–	1	4	–	6	–	1
Kansas	1	–	5	–	1	2	–	7	–	2
Colorado	1	–	5	–	1	2	–	8	–	1
$ – Conference champion; Rankings from AP Poll

The 1982 Oklahoma Sooners football team represented the University of Oklahoma during the 1982 NCAA Division I-A football season. They played their home games at Oklahoma Memorial Stadium and competed as members of the Big Eight Conference. They were coached by head coach Barry Switzer. The Sooners lost to Arizona State 32–21 in the Fiesta Bowl in Tempe, Arizona.

== Schedule ==
Date	Opponent	Rank	Site	TV	Result	Attendance	Source
September 11	West Virginia*	No. 9	Oklahoma Memorial Stadium; Norman, OK	ESPN	L 27–41	75,992	
September 18	Kentucky*		Commonwealth Stadium; Lexington, KY		W 29–8	57,369	
September 25	No. 18 USC*		Oklahoma Memorial Stadium; Norman, OK	ABC	L 0–12	76,758	
October 2	at Iowa State		Cyclone Stadium; Ames, IA	5 Star Cable	W 13–3	52,770	
October 9	vs. No. 13 Texas*		Cotton Bowl; Dallas, TX (Red River Shootout)	5 Star Cable	W 28–22	75,587	
October 16	at Kansas		Memorial Stadium; Lawrence, KS	ESPN	W 38–14	36,230	
October 23	Oklahoma State	No. 20	Oklahoma Memorial Stadium; Norman, OK (Bedlam Series)	KTUL	W 27–9	76,406	
October 30	at Colorado	No. 17	Folsom Field; Boulder, CO	KTVY	W 45–10	43,908	
November 6	Kansas State	No. 14	Oklahoma Memorial Stadium; Norman, OK	ABC	W 24–10	76,129	
November 13	Missouri	No. 15	Oklahoma Memorial Stadium; Norman, OK (rivalry)	CBS	W 41–14	75,960	
November 26	at No. 3 Nebraska	No. 11	Memorial Stadium; Lincoln, NE (rivalry)	CBS	L 24–28	76,398	
January 1, 1983	vs. No. 11 Arizona State*	No. 12	Sun Devil Stadium; Tempe, AZ (Fiesta Bowl)	NBC	L 21–32	70,553	
*Non-conference game; Rankings from AP Poll released prior to the game

== Rankings ==
Ranking movements Legend: ██ Increase in ranking ██ Decrease in ranking — = Not ranked ( ) = First-place votes
	Week															
Poll	Pre	1	2	3	4	5	6	7	8	9	10	11	12	13	14	Final
AP	9	9	—	—	—	—	—	20	17	14	15	14	11	13	12	16
Coaches	8 (1)	8 (1)	—	—	—	—	18	18	15	12	11	9	9	11	10	16

== Game summaries ==
=== Texas ===
Oklahoma Sooners vs. Texas Longhorns

Quarter	1	2	3	4	Total
Texas	0	10	0	12	22
Oklahoma	7	7	7	7	28

at Cotton Bowl • Dallas, Texas

- Date: October 9
- Game time: 2:00 p.m.
- Game weather: Partly cloudy; 67 °F (19 °C); wind 17 mph (27 km/h) N
- Game attendance: 75,587
- Referee: Vance Carlson
- TexasSports.com

Game information

Texas

- Robert Brewer
  18/34, 235 Yds, 2 TD, INT
- Darryl Clark
  18 Rush, 66 Yds
- Carl Robinson
  5 Rec, 53 Yds

Oklahoma

Scoring summary

Quarter	Time	Drive			Team	Scoring information	Score	
Quarter	Time	Plays	Yards	TOP	Team	Scoring information	TEX	OU
1	1:20	4	80	1:42	Oklahoma	Dupree 63-yard touchdown run, Keeling kick good	0	7
2	11:08	12	80	5:12	Texas	Walls 6-yard touchdown reception from Brewer, Allegre kick good	7	7
2	3:03	17	80	8:05	Oklahoma	Wilson 3-yard touchdown run, Keeling kick good	7	14
2	1:35	8	65	1:28	Texas	32-yard field goal by Allegre	10	14
3	10:52	4	69	1:39	Oklahoma	Ledbetter 59-yard touchdown run, Keeling kick good	10	21
4	14:57	10	65	3:57	Texas	Walker 3-yard touchdown run, Allegre kick no good	16	21
4	12:30	6	80	2:27	Oklahoma	Ledbetter 6-yard touchdown run, Keeling kick good	16	28
4	11:04	6	69	1:26	Texas	Walls 27-yard touchdown reception from Brewer, 2-point pass failed	22	28
"TOP" = time of possession. For other American football terms, see Glossary of American football.							22	28

=== At Colorado ===
Oklahoma Sooners (5–2) at Colorado Buffaloes (1–5–1)

Quarter	1	2	3	4	Total
Oklahoma	3	7	14	21	45
Colorado	7	3	0	0	10

at Folsom Field • Boulder, Colorado

- Date: October 30
- Game attendance: 43,908
- SoonerStats.com

Marcus Dupree returned a punt 77 yards for a touchdown, safety Keith Stanberry ran an interception back 49 yard for a score, and tailback Fred Sims rushed for two touchdowns.

=== At Nebraska ===
#11 Oklahoma at #3 Nebraska

Team	1	2	3	4	Total
#11 Oklahoma	7	3	14	0	24
• #3 Nebraska	7	14	7	0	28

- Date: November 26
- Location: Memorial Stadium, Lincoln, Nebraska
- Game attendance: 76,398

=== Vs. Arizona State (Fiesta Bowl) ===
Arizona State vs. Oklahoma

Team	1	2	3	4	Total
• No. 11 Sun Devils	0	11	7	14	32
No. 12 Sooners	7	6	8	0	21

- Date: January 1
- Location: Sun Devil Stadium, Tempe, Arizona
- Game attendance: 70,553
- TV announcers (NBC): Charlie Jones, Len Dawson

Scoring summary
1	OU	Stanley Wilson 1-yard run (kick)	OU 7–0
2	ASU	Luis Zendejas 32-yard field goal	OU 7–3
2	ASU	Safety, Kelly Phelps tackled in end zone	OU 7–5
2	ASU	Luis Zendejas 22-yard field goal	ASU 8–7
2	OU	Stanley Wilson 1-yard run (run failed)	OU 13–8
2	ASU	Luis Zendejas 54-yard field goal	OU 13–11
3	ASU	Darryl Clack 15-yard run (Zendejas kick)	ASU 18–13
3	OU	Fred Sims 19-yard run (Fontenette pass from Phelps)	OU 21–18
4	ASU	Alvin Moore 1-yard run (Zendejas kick)	ASU 25–21
4	ASU	Ron Brown 52-yard pass from Todd Hons (Zendejas kick)	ASU 32–21

== Roster ==
1982 Oklahoma Sooners football team roster
Players
Coaches
Offense

Pos.	#	Name	Class
G	61	Mike Aljoe	Fr
TE	85	Darin Berryhill	So
QB	1	Danny Bradley	So
QB	8	Sonny Brown	Fr
RB	22	Marcus Dupree	Fr
QB	12	Butch Fifield	Fr
OT	70	Scott Leggett	So
QB	14	Rod Pegues	Sr
QB	7	Kelly Phelps	Sr
QB	2	Jim Rockford	Jr
FB	23	Fred Sims	So
RB	13	Steve Sewell	So
C	53	Travis Simpson	Fr
C	73	Chuck Thomas	So
RB	34	Spencer Tillman	Fr
G	76	Steve Williams	Sr
RB	32	Stanley Wilson	Sr
RB	40	Chet Winters	Sr

Defense

Pos.	#	Name	Class
LB	38	Thomas Benson	Jr
NG	90	John Blake	Sr
DT	80	Rick Bryan	Jr
DB	10	Scott Case	Jr
DT	92	Tony Casillas	Fr
DB	33	Dwight Drane	Jr
DB	6	Steve Haworth	Sr
LB	42	Paul Migliazzo	Fr
DE	39	Kevin Murphy	Fr
LB	49	Jackie Shipp	Jr
DB	19	Keith Stanberry	So
DE	88	Mike Weddington	Sr

Special teams

Pos.	#	Name	Class
K	9	John Hoge	Sr
K	99	Daniel Keeling	Sr
K	31	Tim Lashar	Fr

Head coach

- Barry Switzer (10th year)

Coordinators/assistant coaches

- Gary Gibbs (DC)
- Galen Hall (OC)
- Warren Harper (LB)
- Merv Johnson (OL)
- Chuck Lester
- Rex Norris (AHC)
- Lucious Selmon (DL)

Legend

- (C) Team captain
- (S) Suspended
- (I) Ineligible
- Injured
- Redshirt

Roster

== NFL draft ==
The following players were drafted into the National Football League following the season.

Round	Pick	Player	Position	NFL team
6	142	Steve Haworth	Defensive back	Houston Oilers
7	185	Weldon Ledbetter	Running back	Tampa Bay Buccaneers
9	248	Stanley Wilson	Running back	Cincinnati Bengals
