= 1982 Kansas State Wildcats football team =

American college football season

1982 Kansas State Wildcats football

Independence Bowl, L 3–14 vs. Wisconsin
- Conference: Big Eight Conference
- Record: 6–5–1 (3–3–1 Big 8)
- Head coach: Jim Dickey (5th season)
- Offensive coordinator: Jerry Boyce (2nd season)
- Defensive coordinator: Gary Darnell (5th season)
- Home stadium: KSU Stadium

1982 Big Eight Conference football standings
	Conf.					Overall
Team	W		L		T	W		L		T
No. 3 Nebraska $	7	–	0	–	0	12	–	1	–	0
No. 16 Oklahoma	6	–	1	–	0	8	–	4	–	0
Oklahoma State	3	–	2	–	2	4	–	5	–	2
Kansas State	3	–	3	–	1	6	–	5	–	1
Missouri	2	–	3	–	2	5	–	4	–	2
Iowa State	1	–	5	–	1	4	–	6	–	1
Kansas	1	–	5	–	1	2	–	7	–	2
Colorado	1	–	5	–	1	2	–	8	–	1
$ – Conference champion; Rankings from AP Poll

The 1982 Kansas State Wildcats football team represented Kansas State University in the 1982 NCAA Division I-A football season. The team's head football coach was Jim Dickey. The Wildcats played their home games in KSU Stadium.

The Wildcats finished the 1982 season with a record of 6–5–1, and a 3–3–1 record in Big Eight Conference play. It was the program's first winning season since 1970. During the season Kansas State played its first night game in KSU Stadium, a 36–7 win over Kansas. Temporary lights were erected for the game by TBS, which televised the contest. A then-record crowd of 43,167 attended the game.

Following the season, Kansas State was invited to its first ever bowl game, the 1982 Independence Bowl against the Wisconsin Badgers. The Badgers beat the Wildcats, 14–3. The 1982 Independence Bowl was the first college football game televised live by ESPN. After the season Dickey was named coach of the year by the Big Eight Conference.

== Schedule ==
Date	Time	Opponent	Site	TV	Result	Attendance	Source
September 11		Kentucky*	KSU Stadium; Manhattan, KS		W 23–9	29,400	
September 18		South Dakota*	KSU Stadium; Manhattan, KS		W 42–3	31,100	
September 25	1:30 p.m.	Wichita State*	KSU Stadium; Manhattan, KS		W 31–7	40,100	
October 2		at No. 13 Arizona State*	Sun Devil Stadium; Tempe, AZ		L 7–30	61,824	
October 9		Missouri^{†}	KSU Stadium; Manhattan, KS		T 7–7	30,450	
October 16		at No. 6 Nebraska	Memorial Stadium; Lincoln, NE (rivalry)		L 13–42	76,268	
October 23		Kansas	KSU Stadium; Manhattan, KS (rivalry)	WTBS	W 36–7	45,595	
October 30		at Iowa State	Cyclone Stadium; Ames, IA (rivalry)		W 9–3	52,078	
November 6		at No. 14 Oklahoma	Oklahoma Memorial Stadium; Norman, OK	ABC	L 10–24	76,129	
November 13		Oklahoma State	KSU Stadium; Manhattan, KS		L 16–24	30,400	
November 20		Colorado	KSU Stadium; Manhattan, KS (rivalry)		W 33–10	24,300	
December 11		vs. Wisconsin*	Independence Stadium; Shreveport, LA (Independence Bowl)	ESPN	L 3–14	49,523	
*Non-conference game; ^{†}Homecoming; Rankings from AP Poll released prior to the game; All times are in Central time

== Roster ==
1982 Kansas State Wildcats football team roster
Players			Coaches
Offense: Pos. / # / Name / Class; QB / 12 / Stan Weber / Jr	Defense: Pos. / # / Name / Class	Special teams: Pos. / # / Name / Class	Head coach: Jim Dickey; Coordinators/assistant coaches: Gary Darnell – Defensive Coordinator & assistant head coach; Jerry Boyce – Offensive Coordinator; Joe Hatcher – Quarterbacks; Don Bocchi – Running backs; Dick Bumpas – Defensive line; Mo Lattimore – Defensive ends; Chuck Driesbach – Defensive backs; Jim Davie – Assistant; Legend: (C) Team captain; (S) Suspended; (I) Ineligible; Injured; Redshirt
