= Dale Evans (American football, born 1937) =

American football player and coach (1937–2014)

Biographical details
- Born: February 9, 1937; Pierce, West Virginia, U.S.
- Died: May 7, 2014 (aged 77); Spartanburg, South Carolina, U.S.

Playing career
- 1959–1961: West Virginia

Coaching career (HC unless noted)
- 1962–1965: Sistersville HS (WV)
- 1966: Salem
- 1967–1973: West Virginia (freshmen)
- 1974: Texas Tech (assistant)
- 1975–1981: South Carolina (DB)
- 1982: Colorado (DC)
- 1983–1985: North Carolina (DB)
- 1986–1992: Dorman HS (SC)

Administrative career (AD unless noted)
- 1986–2004: Dorman HS (SC)

Head coaching record
- Overall: 2–5–1 (college)

Accomplishments and honors

Championships
- West Virginia Class AAA State (1964)

Dale Maxwell Evans (February 9, 1937 – May 7, 2014) was an American football player and coach. He served as the head football coach at Salem International University in Salem, West Virginia, in 1966 before accepting a post as the freshman coach at West Virginia University in Morgantown, West Virginia, in 1967.

== Head coaching record ==
Year	Team	Overall	Conference	Standing	Bowl/playoffs
Salem Tigers (West Virginia Intercollegiate Athletic Conference) (1966)
1966	Salem	2–5–1	2–3–1	6th	
Salem:		2–5–1	2–3–1		
Total:		2–5–1			
