= Dale Evans (wide receiver) =

American football player and Marine (1939-2017

No. 40
- Position: Wide receiver

Personal information
- Born: September 10, 1939; St. Francis, Kansas, U.S.
- Died: December 29, 2017 (aged 78); Missouri, U.S.
- Listed height: 6 ft 3 in (1.91 m)
- Listed weight: 210 lb (95 kg)

Career information
- High school: Highland Park (Topeka, Kansas)
- College: Kansas State (1957–1960)
- NFL draft: 1961: 6th round, 78th overall pick
- AFL draft: 1961: 6th round, 43rd overall pick

Career history
- Denver Broncos (1961)

Jay Dale Evans (September 10, 1939 – December 29, 2017) was an American professional football wide receiver. He played one season in the American Football League (AFL) for the Denver Broncos in 1961 after playing college football for the Kansas State Wildcats. He was the brother of NASA astronaut and moonwalker Ron Evans. He served with the Marines during the Vietnam War.

== Military awards and medals ==
Awards and decorations earned during service in the United States Marine Corps:

- Navy Cross
- Silver Star
- Purple Heart (3 awards)
- Air Medal (3 awards)
- Combat Gold Wings
- Republic of Vietnam Gallantry Cross with 4 Gold Stars
- Republic of Vietnam Personal Citations (2 awards)
