= List of ambassadors of the United States to Guyana =

Ambassador of the United States to Guyana
- Seal of the United States Department of State

- Flag of a United States ambassador

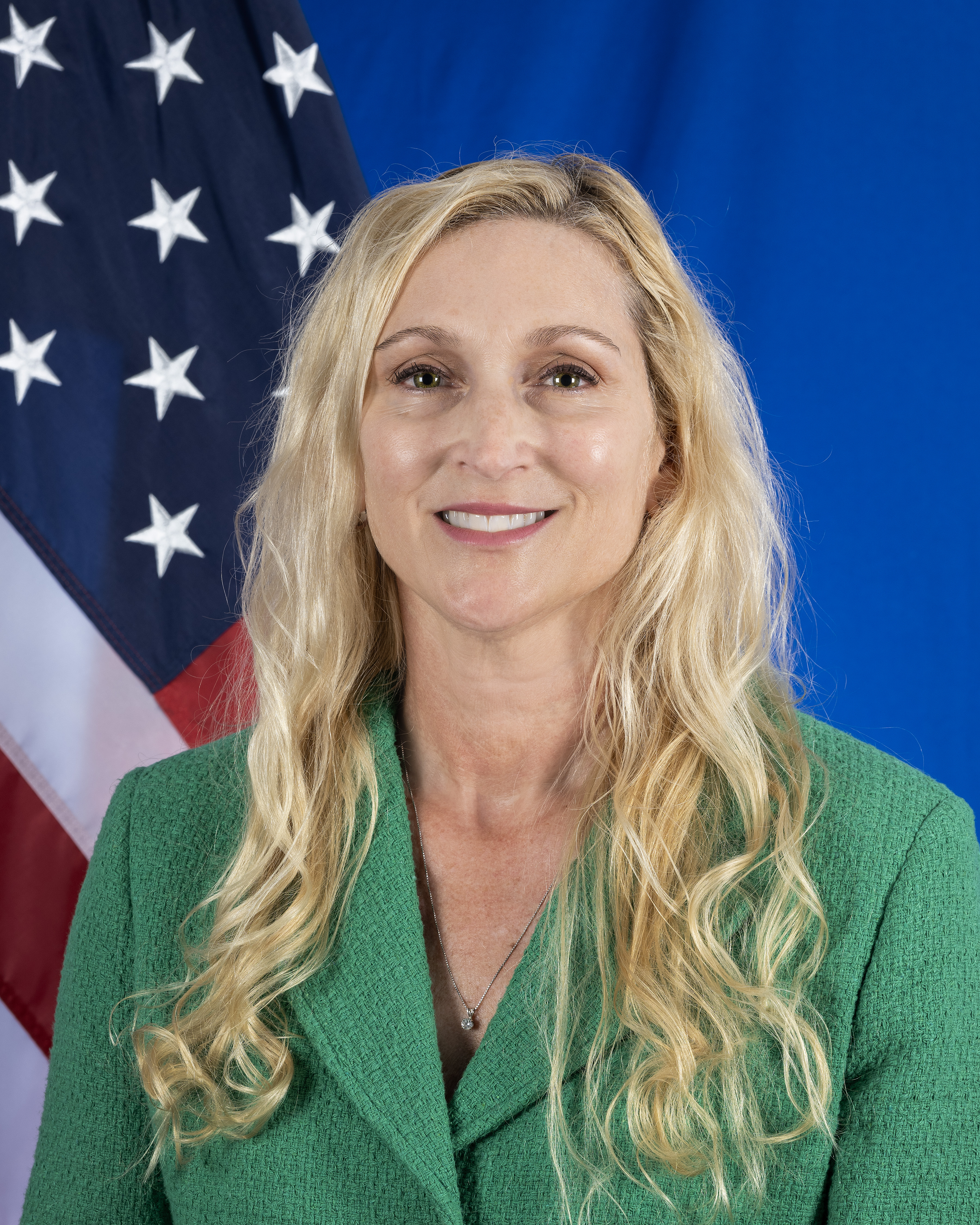
- Incumbent; Nicole D. Theriot since October 23, 2023
- Style: The Honorable
- Residence: Georgetown, Guyana
- Nominator: The president of the United States
- Appointer: The president with Senate advice and consent
- Inaugural holder: Delmar R. Carlson as Chargé d'Affaires ad interim
- Formation: May 26, 1966
- Website: U.S. Embassy - Georgetown

The following is a list of ambassadors of the United States to Guyana. The current title given by the United States State Department to this position is Ambassador Extraordinary and Minister Plenipotentiary.

Representative	Title	Presentation of credentials	Termination of mission	Appointed by
Delmar R. Carlson	Chargé d'Affaires ad interim	May 26, 1966	August 17, 1966	Lyndon B. Johnson
Delmar R. Carlson	Ambassador Extraordinary and Plenipotentiary	August 17, 1966	September 13, 1969	Lyndon B. Johnson
Spencer Matthews King	Ambassador Extraordinary and Plenipotentiary	October 15, 1969	March 8, 1974	Richard Nixon
Max V. Krebs	Ambassador Extraordinary and Plenipotentiary	April 4, 1974	June 15, 1976	Richard Nixon
John R. Burke	Ambassador Extraordinary and Plenipotentiary	September 30, 1977	September 22, 1979	Jimmy Carter
George B. Roberts Jr.	Ambassador Extraordinary and Plenipotentiary	November 5, 1979	September 8, 1981	Jimmy Carter
Gerald Eustis Thomas	Ambassador Extraordinary and Plenipotentiary	February 18, 1982	September 6, 1983	Ronald Reagan
Clint Arlen Lauderdale	Ambassador Extraordinary and Plenipotentiary	August 2, 1984	June 11, 1987	Ronald Reagan
Theresa Anne Tull	Ambassador Extraordinary and Plenipotentiary	September 18, 1987	July 10, 1990	Ronald Reagan
Dennis K. Hays	Chargé d'Affaires ad interim	July 10, 1990	January 21, 1992	George H. W. Bush
George Fleming Jones	Ambassador Extraordinary and Plenipotentiary	January 21, 1992	August 25, 1995	George H. W. Bush
David L. Hobbs	Ambassador Extraordinary and Plenipotentiary	November 2, 1995	September 15, 1996	Bill Clinton
Hugh Simon	Chargé d'Affaires ad interim	September 15, 1996	September 25, 1997	Bill Clinton
James F. Mack	Ambassador Extraordinary and Plenipotentiary	September 25, 1997	April 21, 2000	Bill Clinton
Ronald D. Godard	Ambassador Extraordinary and Plenipotentiary	January 29, 2001	July 6, 2003	George W. Bush
Roland W. Bullen	Ambassador Extraordinary and Plenipotentiary	August 14, 2003	July 14, 2006	George W. Bush
David M. Robinson	Ambassador Extraordinary and Plenipotentiary	August 26, 2006	March 16, 2008	George W. Bush
John Melvin Jones	Ambassador Extraordinary and Plenipotentiary	July 21, 2008	December 31, 2009	George W. Bush
Thomas C. Pierce	Chargé d'Affaires ad interim	August 31, 2010	September 15, 2011	Barack Obama
D. Brent Hardt	Ambassador Extraordinary and Plenipotentiary	September 15, 2011	July 6, 2014	Barack Obama
Perry L. Holloway	Ambassador Extraordinary and Plenipotentiary	October 2, 2015	December 8, 2018	Barack Obama
Terry Steers-Gonzalez	Chargé d'Affaires ad interim	January 2019	March 13, 2019	Donald Trump
Sarah-Ann Lynch	Ambassador Extraordinary and Plenipotentiary	March 13, 2019	September 12, 2023	Donald Trump
Adrienne Galanek	Chargé d'Affaires ad interim	September 13, 2023	October 23, 2023	Joe Biden
Nicole D. Theriot	Ambassador Extraordinary and Plenipotentiary	October 23, 2023	Incumbent	Joe Biden

== Consuls to Demerara, British Guyana ==
As of 1852, the consul employed two or three consular agents.

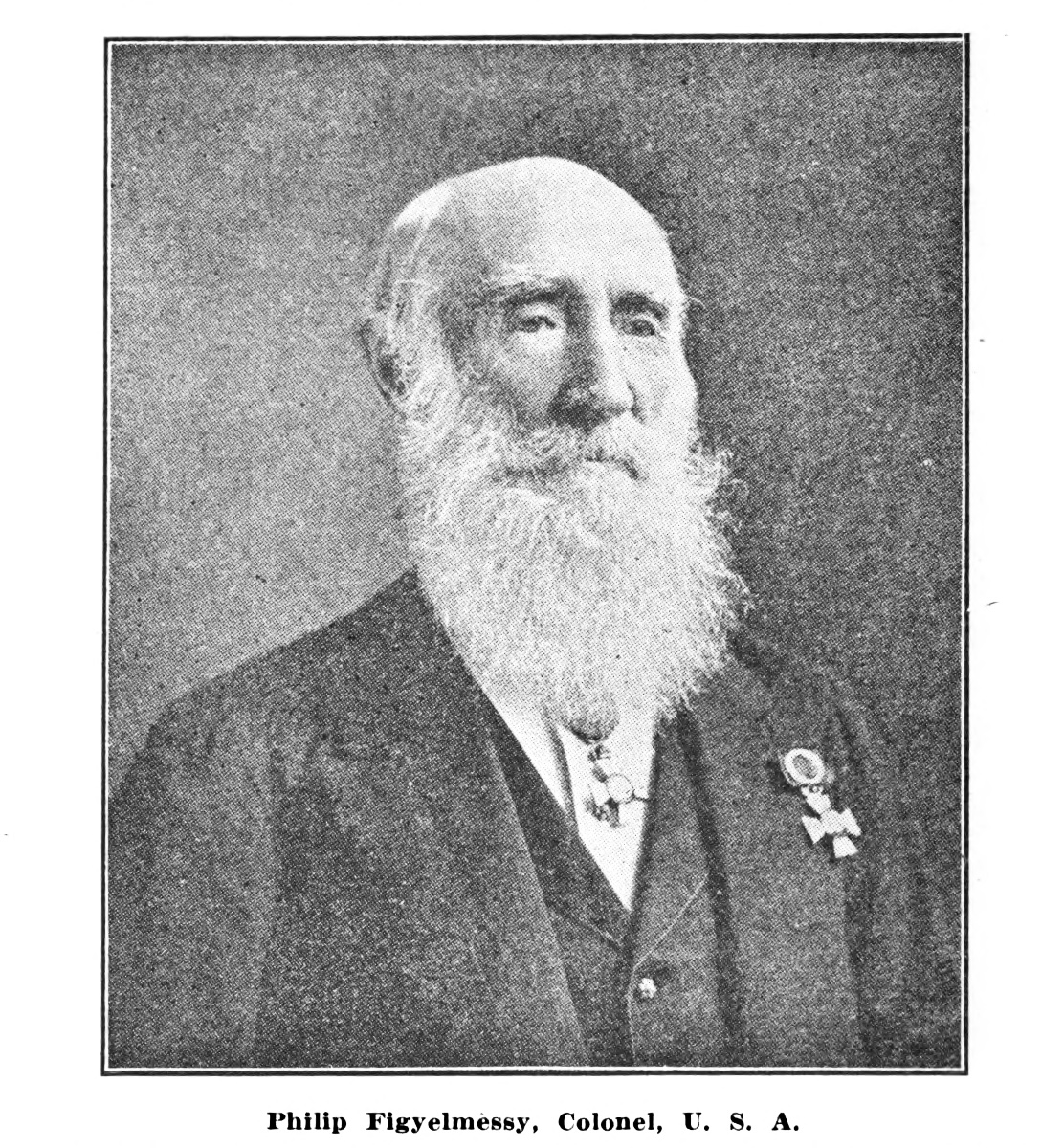
Philip Figyelmessy was appointed to the consulate in 1865 by Abraham Lincoln and served until 1888

- 1832–1846 - Moses Benjamin
- 1846–1849 - Samuel J. Masters
- 1849 - Elijah J. Payne
- 1849–1852 - Charles Benjamin
- 1853–1854 - Rev. Charles Wheeler Denison
- 1858–1859 - A. V. Colvin
- 1860 - Thomas C. Jenkins Jr.
- 1861 - Theodore D. Edwards
- 1863–1864 - Charles Gilbert Hannah
- 1865–1888 - Philip Figyelmessy
- 1887–1888 - David T. Bunker
- 1888–1891 - W. T. Walthall
- 1894 - Louis Springer Deleplaine
- 1895 - Dr. James Spaight
- 1896–1897 - Andrew Johnson Patterson
- 1897–1904 - George H. Moulton

== Consuls to Georgetown, British Guiana ==
- 1905 - William Wedemeyer
- 1905 - John McMackin
- 1914–1916 - George E. Chamberlain
- 1943 - Carlton Hurst Jr.
- 1965 - Delmar Carlson

== See also ==
- Guyana – United States relations
- Foreign relations of Guyana
- Ambassadors of the United States
