= James Mack =

James Mack may refer to:

- James Mack (academic), chemistry professor and dean at the University of Cincinnati
- James Mack (curator), curator, director, advisor and arts advocate in New Zealand
- James F. Mack, American diplomat
- J. C. Mack, American soccer player

== See also ==
- Jimmy Mack, a 1967 song
