= Foreign relations of Guyana =

After independence in 1966, Guyana sought an influential role in international affairs, particularly among developing countries and non-aligned nations. It served twice on the UN Security Council (1975–76 and 1982–83). Former Vice President, Deputy Prime Minister, and Attorney General Mohamed Shahabuddeen served a 9-year term on the International Court of Justice (1987–1996). In June 2023, Guyana was elected as a non-permanent member to the UN Security Council. The country will serve on the council for a period of two years, beginning in January 2024.

Guyana has diplomatic relations with a wide range of nations, and these are managed primarily through its Ministry of Foreign Affairs. The European Union (EU), the Inter-American Development Bank (IDB), the UN Development Programme (UNDP), the World Health Organization (WHO), and the Organization of American States (OAS) have offices in Georgetown.

== Regional relations ==
Guyana strongly supports the concept of regional integration. It played an important role in the founding of the Caribbean Community and Common Market (CARICOM), but its historic status as the organization's poorest member limited its ability to exert leadership in regional activities. Since discovering and developing its offshore oil and gas reserves, Guyana has been reclassified by the World Bank as a high-income country. Guyana has sought to keep foreign policy in close alignment with the consensus of CARICOM members, especially in voting in the UN, OAS, and other international organizations. In 2022, Guyana joined the Regional Security System. The Guyana–Venezuela diplomatic crisis has compelled Guyana to expand defense and security relations with a variety of countries, namely Brazil, the United States, India, and the United Kingdom.

== International disputes ==
All of the area west of the Essequibo River has at one point been under dispute, namely by Venezuela and Brazil. In 1899, the government in Caracas reluctantly accepted the Venezuelan-Guyanese border but later revived its claim to the Essequibo in 1962. Suriname has an ongoing dispute with Guyana and this pertains to the area east of the Upper Courantyne.

Currently, two neighbours have longstanding territorial disputes with Guyana. Since the 19th century, Venezuela has claimed the majority or all of Guyana situated west of the Essequibo River – 62% of Guyana's territory. At a meeting in Geneva in 1966, the two countries agreed to receive recommendations from a representative of the UN Secretary General on ways to settle the dispute peacefully. Diplomatic contacts between the two countries and the Secretary General's representative continue. In December 2023, president Nicolás Maduro called for a public referendum which resulted in the government of Venezuela officially claiming ownership of the Essequibo, claim that resulted in the 2023 Guyana–Venezuela crisis.

Neighbouring Suriname also claims the territory east of Guyana's New River, a largely uninhabited area of some 15,000 square kilometres (5,800 sq mi) in southeast Guyana. Guyana and Suriname also disputed their offshore maritime boundaries. This dispute flared up in June 2000 in response to an effort by a Canadian company to drill for oil under a Guyanese concession. Guyana regards its legal title to all of its territory as sound. However, the dispute with Suriname was arbitrated by the United Nations Convention on Law of the Sea and a ruling in favor of Guyana was announced in September 2007.

== Crime ==
In 1993, Guyana ratified the 1988 Vienna Convention on illicit traffic in narcotic drugs and cooperates with US law enforcement agencies on counter-narcotics efforts. Guyana is also a member of the International Criminal Court with a Bilateral Immunity Agreement of protection for the US-military (as covered under Article 98).

Guyana has been considered a transshipment point for narcotics from South America, primarily Venezuela, to Europe and the United States and producer of cannabis.

== Relations by country ==
=== List ===
List of countries which Guyana maintains diplomatic relations with:

#	Country	Date
1	Saint Kitts and Nevis	Unknown
2	Canada	26 May 1966
3	India	26 May 1966
4	Trinidad and Tobago	26 May 1966
5	United Kingdom	26 May 1966
6	United States	26 May 1966
7	Germany	2 September 1966
8	Venezuela	25 November 1966
9	Barbados	30 November 1966
10	Italy	12 April 1967
11	Japan	11 June 1967
12	France	22 June 1967
13	Pakistan	10 November 1967
14	South Korea	13 June 1968
15	Brazil	26 August 1968
16	Jamaica	20 June 1969
17	Netherlands	15 May 1970
18	Guinea	8 June 1970
19	Uganda	21 July 1970
20	Nigeria	27 July 1970
21	Haiti	6 October 1970
22	Ethiopia	13 October 1970
23	Dominican Republic	19 October 1970
24	Russia	17 December 1970
25	Colombia	18 December 1970
26	Tanzania	28 December 1970
27	Kenya	December 1970
28	Zambia	11 February 1971
29	Belgium	10 June 1971
30	Peru	17 July 1971
31	Chile	22 July 1971
32	Egypt	10 September 1971
33	Cyprus	11 February 1972
34	Bangladesh	24 March 1972
35	China	27 June 1972
36	Poland	10 July 1972
37	Libya	9 August 1972
38	Argentina	6 October 1972
39	Cuba	8 December 1972
40	Mexico	1 March 1973
41	Panama	16 March 1973
42	Austria	3 April 1973
43	Turkey	2 May 1973
44	Syria	19 June 1973
45	Romania	20 June 1973
46	Bahamas	10 July 1973
47	Cambodia	5 September 1973
48	Australia	7 January 1974
49	Costa Rica	17 April 1974
50	North Korea	18 May 1974
51	Ecuador	2 July 1974
52	Sri Lanka	14 July 1974
53	New Zealand	1 September 1974
54	Iraq	22 September 1974
55	Sierra Leone	25 October 1974
56	Liberia	11 November 1974
57	Vietnam	19 April 1975
58	Sweden	16 June 1975
59	Hungary	9 July 1975
60	Mozambique	21 August 1975
61	Botswana	28 October 1975
62	Suriname	25 November 1975
63	Malta	12 March 1976
64	Czech Republic	17 May 1976
65	Malaysia	26 April 1976
66	Algeria	20 September 1976
67	Bulgaria	25 March 1977
68	Switzerland	24 May 1977
69	Angola	24 July 1977
70	Dominica	3 November 1978
71	Portugal	14 February 1979
72	Saint Lucia	22 February 1979
73	Finland	2 April 1979
74	Ghana	14 May 1979
75	Greece	14 May 1979
76	Niger	25 June 1979
77	Norway	2 August 1979
78	Lesotho	25 August 1979
79	Spain	12 October 1979
80	Saint Vincent and the Grenadines	27 October 1979
81	Denmark	16 November 1979
82	Mongolia	15 December 1979
83	Grenada	February 1980
84	Yemen	14 June 1980
85	Zimbabwe	19 June 1980
86	Belize	21 September 1981
87	Nicaragua	23 November 1981
88	Antigua and Barbuda	3 February 1982
89	Albania	1 April 1985
90	Uruguay	3 June 1985
91	Iran	6 September 1986
92	Bolivia	12 March 1987
93	Burkina Faso	23 September 1987
94	Thailand	17 December 1987
95	Brunei	20 June 1990
96	Israel	9 March 1992
97	El Salvador	1 May 1992
98	Guatemala	1 May 1992
99	Honduras	1 May 1992
100	Mauritius	1 December 1992
101	Slovakia	1 January 1993
102	Eswatini	26 February 1993
103	Seychelles	28 April 1993
104	Maldives	13 April 1994
105	Paraguay	14 April 1994
106	Nepal	22 June 1994
107	Namibia	3 November 1994
108	South Africa	4 November 1994
109	United Arab Emirates	6 February 1995
110	Azerbaijan	9 January 1995
111	Lebanon	2 March 1995
112	Kuwait	17 August 1995
113	Oman	17 January 1996
114	Qatar	23 August 1996
115	Solomon Islands	26 November 1996
—	Holy See	9 June 1997
116	Turkmenistan	11 June 1997
117	Bahrain	19 November 1997
118	Jordan	19 August 1998
—	Sovereign Military Order of Malta	19 May 1999
119	Indonesia	27 August 1999
120	Ireland	2 February 2000
121	Belarus	25 February 2000
122	Ukraine	15 November 2001
123	Singapore	19 September 2002
124	North Macedonia	22 September 2003
125	Armenia	24 October 2003
126	Iceland	10 March 2005
127	Latvia	16 March 2005
128	Croatia	25 September 2006
129	Estonia	20 April 2007
130	Slovenia	20 April 2007
131	Philippines	25 September 2008
132	Luxembourg	17 June 2009
133	Gambia	24 September 2009
134	Senegal	10 November 2009
135	Montenegro	21 September 2011
136	Lithuania	25 January 2012
137	Saudi Arabia	22 February 2012
138	Georgia	23 April 2012
139	Tuvalu	28 September 2012
140	Morocco	14 December 2012
141	Kazakhstan	11 January 2013
—	State of Palestine	21 February 2013
142	Bosnia and Herzegovina	9 May 2013
—	Kosovo	13 June 2013
143	Moldova	12 September 2013
144	Fiji	8 December 2014
145	Kyrgyzstan	23 September 2016
146	San Marino	17 February 2019
147	Rwanda	24 August 2022
148	Tajikistan	19 September 2022
149	Uzbekistan	10 October 2022
150	Cape Verde	4 April 2023
151	Benin	9 July 2024
152	Serbia	22 September 2024
153	Ivory Coast	23 April 2026
154	Andorra	21 September 2026

=== Africa ===
Country	Formal Relations Began	Notes
Botswana	1975	Both countries have established diplomatic relations on 28 October 1975.; Guyana is covered through the Botswana Mission in New York City.; Both countries are full members of Commonwealth of Nations.
Namibia	1994	Both countries have established diplomatic relations on 13 December 1994.; Both countries are full members of Commonwealth of Nations.; Guyana is accredited to Namibia from its high commission in Pretoria, South Africa.; Namibia is accredited to Guyana from its Permanent Mission to the United Nations in New York City.
Sahrawi Arab Democratic Republic	28 September 2012	Guyana and the Sahrawi Arab Democratic Republic maintained diplomatic relations between 28 September 2012 and November 2020.
South Africa	4 November 1994	Both countries established diplomatic relations on 4 November 1994.; South Africa is represented in Guyana through its High Commission in Kingston, Jamaica.

=== Americas ===
Country	Formal Relations Began	Notes
Argentina	6 October 1972	Both countries have established diplomatic relations on 6 October 1972.; Argentina has an embassy in Georgetown, Guyana.; Both countries are full members of Organization of American States and Union of South American Nations.
Barbados		See Barbados–Guyana relations The relations between Guyana and Barbados had its genesis to a time when both Guyana (then British Guiana) and Barbados were both British colonies. Shortly after Great Britain secured British Guiana from the Dutch, waves of migrants were encouraged to move and settle in Guyana. Barbados was one such location where large numbers of migrants came from. Through time Barbados and Guyana have both supported each other. With the move towards independence in the region Guyana was seen as the breadbasket of the wider Caribbean which led to yet more waves of Barbadians seeking to move to Guyana for better opportunities. Relations have been rocky, during the 1990s, immigration became contentious for Guyanese persons to Barbados. Such terms as the "Guyanese bench" in the immigration area of the Barbados Sir Grantley Adams International Airport have tested both states at times. The two nations continue their cooperation through the Caribbean Community (CARICOM) and work towards building and maintaining good relations between their nationals. Both nations also attempt to maintain open communications at high levels of both Governments. More recently the Guyanese Government has extended an offer to Barbadians. The Guyanese government has offered to put in place an economically favourable regime towards any Barbadians that wish to relocate to Guyana and contribute towards that nation's goals in agricultural investment. The announcement was made in the final days of the Owen Arthur administration by MP member Mia Mottley. In the early 1990s the Prime Minister of Trinidad and Tobago, Patrick Manning pitched an initiative for Barbados, Guyana and Trinidad and Tobago to enter into some form of political union or political association. This initiative was short lived and didn't proceed following the Democratic Labour Party's defeat during the 1994 elections.
Belize	1981	See Belize–Guyana relations: Belize has a high commission in Georgetown.; Guyana is accredited to Belize from its Ministry of Foreign Affairs in Georgetown and maintains an honorary consulate in Belize City.
Brazil		See Brazil–Guyana relations Brazil–Guyana relations have traditionally been close. Brazil has provided military assistance to Guyana in the form of war fare training and logistics. Bilateral relations between the countries have recently increased, as a result of Brazil's new South-South foreign policy aimed to strengthen South American integration. During a state visit by Brazilian President Luiz Inácio Lula da Silva to Georgetown on 2 March 2007, the governments of Guyana and Brazil signed several cooperation agreements and announced plans to boost trade between the two countries.
Canada		Canada started relations with Guyana in 1964 with the construction of the Commission of Canada in Georgetown. In 1966 it became a Canadian High Commission. There is a Guyanese High Commission in Ottawa and a Guyanese Consulate in Toronto. Canada and Guyana have strong ties through the Commonwealth of Nations. There is an estimated 200,000 Guyanese living in Canada. The Royal Canadian Mounted Police and the Guyanese police work closely to help with drug, and human smuggling. Guyana's largest import from Canada is machinery (CAD $13 mil), and export is precious metals (CAD$482 mil). Food exports generally cater to Canada's Guyanese diaspora population.
Dominica	3 November 1978	Dominica and Guyana have established diplomatic relations on 3 November 1978.: Guyana has a High Commission in Roseau.
Mexico	1 March 1973	See Guyana–Mexico relations: Guyana is accredited to Mexico from its embassy in Washington, D.C., United States.; Mexico has an embassy in Georgetown.
Suriname	25 November 1975	See Guyana–Suriname relations: Both countries established diplomatic relations on 25 November 1975.; Both countries are full members of the Organization of American States, and of the Caribbean Community.; There is an ongoing territorial dispute between Guyana and Suriname regarding the Tigri Area.
Trinidad and Tobago	26 May 1966	See Guyana-Trinidad and Tobago relations Guyana and Trinidad and Tobago have had historically close ties due to their shared culture, history, dominion under the British Empire, demographics and religion. Both Countries have a substantial population of Hindus from indentured servitude from India along with a large African population from Africa. Both countries are a part of the Commonwealth of Nations and CARICOM. Trinidad was the largest forgiver of debt in the 1990s Paris Club Agreement to Guyana, forgiving Hundred of Millions of Debt. A substantial number of Guyanese people live in Trinidad and Tobago. In recent years, relations between the two countries warmed with Guyana establishing its First Diplomatic Mission in Port of Spain in 2017. In 2018, they signed a Memorandum of Understanding on Energy Cooperation.
United States		See Guyana–United States relations U.S. policy toward The Co-operative Republic of Guyana seeks to develop robust, sustainable democratic institutions, laws, and political practices; support economic growth and development; and promote stability and security. During the last years of his administration, President Hoyte sought to improve relations with the United States as part of a decision to move his country toward genuine political nonalignment. Relations also were improved by Hoyte's efforts to respect human rights, invite international observers for the 1992 elections, and reform electoral laws. The United States also welcomed the Hoyte government's economic reform and efforts, which stimulated investment and growth. The 1992 democratic elections and Guyana's reaffirmation of sound economic policies and respect for human rights have placed U.S.-Guyanese relations on an excellent footing. Under successive PPP governments, the United States and Guyana continued to improve relations. President Cheddi Jagan was committed to democracy, adopted more free market policies, and pursued sustainable development for Guyana's environment.: Guyana has an embassy in Washington, DC and a consulate-general in New York City.; United States has an embassy in Georgetown.
Uruguay	1985	Both countries established diplomatic relations on 3 June 1985.; Both countries are full members of Organization of American States and Union of South American Nations.
Venezuela		See Guyana–Venezuela relations Venezuela claimed more than half of the territory of the British colony of Guyana at the time of the Latin American wars of independence, a dispute that was settled by arbitration in 1899. In 1962 Venezuela declared that it would no longer abide by the arbitration decision, which ceded mineral-rich territory in the Orinoco basin to Guyana. The area is called "Guayana Esequiba" by Venezuela. A border commission was set up in 1966 with representatives from Guyana, Venezuela and Great Britain, but failed to reach agreement. Venezuela vetoed Guyana's bid to become a member of the Organization of American States (OAS) in 1967. In 1969 Venezuela backed an abortive uprising in the disputed area. Under intense diplomatic pressure, Venezuela agreed in 1970 to a 12-year moratorium on the dispute with the Protocol of Port-of-Spain. In 1981, Venezuela refused to renew the protocol. However, with changes to the governments of both countries relations improved, to the extent that in 1990 Venezuela sponsored Guyana's bid for OAS membership in 1990.

=== Asia ===
Country	Formal Relations Began	Notes
China		See China–Guyana relations Bilateral relations are good and progress on the economic side. In 2022 exports from Guyana to China reached sum $1 billion. Currently Chinese state owned companies are working to construct the largest bridge in Guyana which will span the Demerara River. Trade between the two nations has grown significantly, rising from $180 million in 2013 to $1.4 billion in 2024. However, China recently expressed displeasure with Guyanese President Irfaan Ali’s stance during U.S. Secretary of State Marco Rubio’s visit, reaffirming its commitment to China-Guyana friendship.
India		See Guyana–India relations Relations between India and Guyana ever since the independence of Guyana in May 1966 have been cordial. The cordiality in the relation remains unaffected with changes in governments either in India or in Guyana. Late Shrimati Indira Gandhi, the then Prime Minister of India, visited Guyana in 1968, late Dr. Shankar Dayal Sharma, the then Vice President of India visited Guyana in 1988 and Shri Bhairon Singh Shekhawat, the then Vice President of India came on a state visit to Guyana in 2006. The cooperation between the two countries in sharing developmental experience is mainly routed through Indian Technical & Economic Cooperation (ITEC) under which forty scholarships are granted every year in various courses. Besides, some experts are also deputed to Guyana from time to time on request in specified areas of activity. Several other scholarships are also available to Guyanese to pursue long-term courses, to get acquainted with India and to learn Hindi language in India. India has offered credit facilities to Guyana for use in mutually accepted designated fields, agriculture and information technology, being two of these. Indian companies have also expressed interest in bio fuel, energy, minerals and pharmaceuticals. Total trade turn over remains low, though the trend is positive. Indian Cultural Centre in Georgetown was established in 1972 with the objective of strengthening cultural relations and mutual understanding between India and Guyana and their peoples. The Centre runs regular classes in Yoga and Dance (Kathak). The centre has a well equipped Auditorium where cultural events are organised on a regular basis. The teachers and students of ICC participate in events by the local community on various occasions round the year. The centre has a library with books/publications on history, literature, art, culture, mythology and works of eminent scholars and authors. An important cultural connection between India and Guyana is cricket. With the advent of the Indian Premier League, many Guyanese players were contracted to play in India.
Qatar		Guyana has an embassy in Doha.; Qatar has an embassy in Georgetown.
South Korea	June 13, 1968	The Republic of Guyana and The Republic of Korea established diplomatic relations on 1968-06-13.

=== Europe ===
Country	Formal Relations Began	Notes
Croatia	25 February 2003	Both countries established diplomatic relations on 25 February 2003.; Croatia is represented in Guyana through its Permanent Mission in New York City.
Cyprus	11 May 2011	Both countries established diplomatic relation on 11 May 2011.; Cyprus is represented in Guyana by its embassy in Brasília, Brazil.; Both countries are full members of Commonwealth of Nations.
Denmark	16 November 1979	Both countries established diplomatic relations on 16 November 1979.; Denmark is represented in Guyana, through its embassy in Brasília.; Guyana is represented in Denmark, through its embassy in Brussels.
Finland	1979	Both countries established diplomatic relations on 2 April 1979.; Guyana is represented in Finland by their embassy in Brussels, Belgium.; Finland also has an honorary consulate general in Georgetown.
France	1967	Both countries established diplomatic relations on 22 June 1967.; France is represented in Guyana through its embassy in Paramaribo, Suriname.; France has an honorary consulate in Guyana.; Both countries have passed a number of bilateral treaties.
Germany	1966	See: Germany–Guyana relations: Both countries established diplomatic relations in 1966.; Germany is represented in Guyana through its embassy in Port of Spain, Trinidad and Tobago.
Georgia	23 April 2012	Both countries established diplomatic relations on 23 April 2012.; Bilateral political consultations between the Foreign Agencies cooperation is ongoing between both countries in political, legal, cultural, trade and economic relations. Cooperation concerning the academic exchanges is successfully implemented.
Greece	14 May 1979	Both countries established diplomatic relations on 14 May 1979.; Greece is represented in Guyana by its embassy in Caracas, Venezuela.; Greece has provided Guyana with development aid in the past.
Netherlands	15 May 1970	Both countries established diplomatic relations on 15 May 1970.; Netherlands is represented in Guyana by its embassy in Paramaribo, Suriname; Suriname is represented in the Netherlands by its embassy in Brussels, Belgium
Russia	17 December 1970	See Guyana–Russia relations: Both countries established diplomatic relations on 17 December 1970.; Guyana is represented in Russia by its High Commission in London, United Kingdom.; Russia is represented in Guyana by its embassy in Georgetown, Guyana.
Serbia	5 November 1968	Both countries established diplomatic relations on 5 November 1968.; Serbia is represented in Guyana through its embassy in Washington, D.C.
United Kingdom	26 May 1966	See Guyana–United Kingdom relations Guyanese President Irfaan Ali with British Prime Minister Keir Starmer at a Commonwealth summit in Apia, October 2024. Guyana established diplomatic relations with the United Kingdom on the 26 May 1966.: Guyana maintains a high commission in London.; The United Kingdom is accredited to Guyana through its high commission in Georgetown.; The UK governed Guyana from 1803 to 1966, when Guyana achieved full independence. Both countries share common membership of the Atlantic Co-operation Pact, the Commonwealth, and the World Trade Organization, as well as the CARIFORUM–United Kingdom Economic Partnership Agreement. Bilaterally the two countries have a Double Taxation Convention, and an Investment Agreement.

=== Oceania ===
Country	Formal Relations Began	Notes
Australia		Australia is represented in Guyana through its embassy in Port of Spain, Trinidad and Tobago.; Both countries are members of the Commonwealth of Nations.

== See also ==
- Ministry of Foreign Affairs (Guyana)
- List of diplomatic missions in Guyana
- List of diplomatic missions of Guyana
