= Spencer King =

Spencer King may refer to:

- Spencer Matthews King (1917–1988), American diplomat
- Charles Spencer King (1925–2010), commonly known as Spencer King, British automobile engineer
