= Odessa Primus =

Guyanese comedian, activist and politician

Hon. Odessa Primus

Member of the National Assembly of Guyana
- Incumbent
- Assumed office 2025

Personal details
- Party: We Invest in Nationhood

Odessa Primus is a Guyanese comedian, community activist and politician. She is a member of the National Assembly of Guyana for the opposition We Invest in Nationhood (WIN) party and serves as WIN's general secretary.

Before entering Parliament, Primus was best known as a stand-up comedian and producer of popular shows such as Uncensored and Laffy Laffy Baby, as well as for her community feeding programme in Sophia, Greater Georgetown.

== Early life and education ==
Primus is from Bartica, in Guyana's Cuyuni–Mazaruni region. A 2023 profile in Guyana Standard describes her as a "Bartica native" and one of the country's best-known female comedians.

According to the same interview, Primus lost her mother at the age of six and grew up with an aunt before moving to Georgetown in her teens. Stabroek News features have highlighted her long-standing interest in the performing arts from nursery school and her participation in singing, poetry and theatre before she settled on stand-up comedy as her main medium.

== Comedy and media career ==
Primus first came to wider prominence on the local comedy circuit through the Uncensored shows staged at the National Cultural Centre in Georgetown. Stabroek News credited her with performances that mixed sharp social commentary and physical humour, and described her as "much more than a routine teller of jokes", noting her frequent appearances at benefit events and theatre productions.

In 2022 she wrote, directed and produced the touring comedy show Laffy Laffy Baby, which premiered in Bartica before playing in Berbice, Linden and Georgetown and featured a cast of emerging Guyanese comedians.

By the early 2020s Primus had also become a social media personality, using comedic sketches and livestreams to comment on social and political issues. Guyana Standard described her as "one of the funniest women in the field of comedy locally" and noted that she had developed a strong online following.

== Community work and activism ==
Living in B Field Sophia, Primus has organised a feeding programme for vulnerable residents. A 2020 Stabroek News feature reported that, with support from donors, she was providing one meal three days a week for around 100 children, and that she hoped to expand the programme to include more seniors and families in need.

Through public talks, stage shows and online commentary, Primus has advocated greater respect and institutional support for performing artists in Guyana, arguing that creative work is often undervalued despite its contribution to national life.

== Political career ==
=== We Invest in Nationhood ===
Primus emerged as a prominent supporter of businessman Azruddin Mohamed and the newly formed We Invest in Nationhood (WIN) party in the lead-up to the 2025 Guyanese general election. By mid-2025 multiple outlets were referring to her as WIN's general secretary.

In its first national contest WIN won 16 seats in the National Assembly, making it the largest opposition party.

=== Member of Parliament ===
Before the general election Primus told Kaieteur News that she had been approached to be on WIN's list of prospective parliamentarians but said she was "uncertain" about taking up a seat, arguing that her work for the country did not depend solely on holding office.

Following the election and the convening of the Thirteenth Parliament, Primus was sworn in as a first-time Member of Parliament for WIN. News reports and televised coverage from early November 2025 refer to her as "WIN MP Odessa Primus" taking her seat in the National Assembly.

As both MP and general secretary, Primus has played a public role in WIN's campaigns and press conferences. In July 2025 she opened a manifesto launch press conference by stressing that the party's proposals were the result of a collaborative effort with citizens and civil society groups. In November 2025 she helped lead street protests organised by WIN to press for the timely election of a Leader of the Opposition, arguing that the delay undermined democratic norms.

== Visa incident and privacy debate ==
In May 2025 Primus was denied entry to the United States after travelling on a visitor visa. Stabroek News reported that she returned to Guyana the same day, and that her U.S. visa was cancelled in connection with a "withdrawal of application for admission", a procedure that allows travellers to leave voluntarily rather than face formal removal proceedings.

Other outlets, citing unnamed sources, reported that U.S. authorities linked the decision to her public association with businessman Azruddin Mohamed, who is under U.S. sanctions, and to her defence of him on social media; Primus has not been accused of any crime and has publicly denied wrongdoing.

In an interview with Village Voice News she said she had opted for cancellation of the visa instead of pursuing a legal challenge, arguing that she wanted to pre-empt what she described as potential targeting by the Guyanese government. The circulation on social media of images of her passport and cancelled visa, apparently taken shortly after she arrived back at Cheddi Jagan International Airport, sparked broader debate about data protection and privacy in Guyana. A subsequent letter to the editor in Stabroek News argued that the episode should not be a source of ridicule and raised questions about how official information was handled.

== Public reception and criticism ==
Primus's outspoken style has attracted both strong support and criticism. Supporters have praised her for using humour to highlight social inequality and for her work in poor communities.

In July 2025 the Guyana Chronicle reported criticism of her behaviour at a public meeting in Bartica, where a resident said he felt ridiculed after asking a question about WIN's economic plans; the paper characterised her responses as "insults".

== See also ==
- We Invest in Nationhood
- Politics of Guyana
