= Aubrey Norton =

Guyanese politician

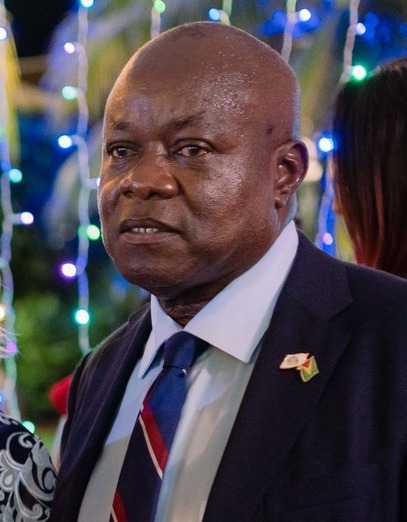
- Norton at the US Embassy in Georgetown, 2022

Leader of the Opposition
- In office 13 April 2022 – 3 November 2025
- President: Irfaan Ali
- Preceded by: Joseph Harmon
- Succeeded by: Azruddin Mohamed (2026)

Member of the National Assembly
- Incumbent
- Assumed office 13 April 2022
- Preceded by: Nicolette Henry

Leader of the People's National Congress Reform Party
- Incumbent
- Assumed office 20 December 2021
- Preceded by: David A. Granger

Personal details
- Born: Aubrey Compton Norton; 6 July 1957 (age 69) Linden, Upper Demerara-Berbice, Guyana
- Party: People's National Congress Reform
- Education: University of Guyana; University of Kent

Aubrey Compton Norton (born 6 July 1957) is a Guyanese politician serving as a member of the National Assembly since April 2022.

== Early life and education ==
Norton was born on 6 July 1957 in Christianburg, Linden. Norton became a member of the Youth Socialist Movement, the youth arm of the People's National Congress Reform (PNCR), from an early age. Norton received a diploma in political science from Julio Antonio Mella College in Cuba. Norton attended the University of Guyana, where he received a Bachelor's degree, also in political science. Norton joined the foreign service in the 1980s after completing his education. He then went on to study an MA in international relations at the University of Kent in the United Kingdom, graduating in 1994.

== Early career ==
Norton became General Secretary of the PNCR in 1997 (at the time one of the Party's youngest General Secretaries) before being dismissed by then-party leader Desmond Hoyte whilst Hoyte was leader of the opposition. He served as a parliamentarian for the PNCR between 1998 and 2001, and as of 2022 had served as a member of parliament for nine years in total.

In 2009, when Norton was serving on the Party Executive, he was accused of libel by Robert Corbin after Norton made accusations that the process by which Norton lost the vote for Chairman of the Georgetown District was fraudulent. Norton lost the vote for chairmanship of Georgetown District to Volda Lawrence by a margin of 96 to 220. Norton would later be expelled from the party executive and ousted from parliament due to a split with Corbin.

In 2011, Norton had a role in regaining a seat in Region 10 that had previously been held by the Alliance for Change since 2006. From 2011 to 2015, Norton was left out of government and not selected for a parliamentary seat. In 2014, he challenged for leadership of the party, but was defeated by David A. Granger.

In 2015, he was appointed as a Presidential Advisor on Youth Empowerment, at which point he was already serving as Chairman of Georgetown District, and was a member of the party executive. In 2019, he was still serving as an executive member of the PNCR.

Norton has served as a part-time lecturer in Political Science at the University of Guyana. Norton has also served at the Ministry of Foreign Affairs. For a period of time, Norton was head of day-to-day operations at Critchlow Labour College in Georgetown.

Norton served as Executive Director in the office of Joseph Harmon when Harmon was leader of the opposition after the 2020 general election.

== Leader of the People's National Congress ==
Norton was elected as Leader of the People's National Congress party in December 2021, replacing incumbent leader David A. Granger. He won in a landslide, defeating Joseph Harmon and Dr Richard Van West-Charles. He was installed as party leader on 20 December 2021. Out of 1,200 votes, Norton received 967, Harmon received 245 and Van West-Charles received 64.

On 13 April 2022, Norton was appointed as a member of the National Assembly after the resignation of Nicolette Henry two weeks before, filling her vacant seat. He was then officially elected as Leader of the Opposition, filling the role left vacant after the resignation of Joseph Harmon.

On 14 April 2022, Van West-Charles went public with criticism of Norton and withdrew from his advisory role, complaining that he had been ignored by party membership and sidelined after being appointed as Norton's advisor.

== Political views ==
Norton's political views have been described as "a working class ideology." Norton strongly criticised the results of the 2020 Guyanese general election, stating in an interview that "Irfaan Ali’s status of President is questionable; we see him as an illegal president – illegitimate, who’s awaiting the outcome of an elections petition." Norton also stated that "The reality is that they are the government of Guyana but you can be a government and still not be legitimate." As an act of protest, Norton has used a refusal to shake the President's hand as a political statement, after claiming that the President "Bullied" him into a handshake during a function hosted by the United Kingdom High Commissioner.

Referring to the previous Presidents of Guyana, Norton said the following in an interview: "I would shudder to think that any APNU+AFC supporter would want David Granger to meet with Jagdeo, who was disrespectful; Ali, who is illegitimate; Ramotar, who was useless; and Sam Hinds, who many people thought was a robot. It doesn't make good sense to me.”
