= Mary M. Ourisman =

American diplomat

Mary Ourisman
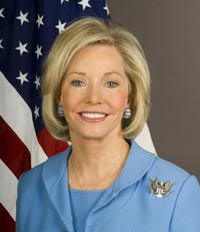

United States Ambassador to Saint Vincent and the Grenadines
- In office February 26, 2007 – January 16, 2009
- President: George W. Bush
- Preceded by: Mary Kramer
- Succeeded by: Brent Hardt (Chargé d'affaires)

United States Ambassador to Saint Lucia
- In office February 20, 2007 – January 16, 2009
- President: George W. Bush
- Preceded by: Mary Kramer
- Succeeded by: Brent Hardt (Chargé d'affaires)

United States Ambassador to Saint Kitts and Nevis
- In office November 14, 2006 – January 16, 2009
- President: George W. Bush
- Preceded by: Mary Kramer
- Succeeded by: Brent Hardt (Chargé d'affaires)

9th United States Ambassador to Antigua and Barbuda
- In office November 7, 2006 – January 16, 2009
- President: George W. Bush
- Preceded by: Mary Kramer
- Succeeded by: Larry Leon Palmer

United States Ambassador to Barbados
- In office November 7, 2006 – January 16, 2009
- President: George W. Bush
- Preceded by: Mary Kramer
- Succeeded by: Brent Hardt (Chargé d'affaires)

United States Ambassador to Dominica
- In office November 7, 2006 – January 16, 2009
- President: George W. Bush
- Preceded by: Mary Kramer
- Succeeded by: Brent Hardt (Chargé d'affaires)

United States Ambassador to Grenada
- In office November 7, 2006 – January 16, 2009
- Preceded by: Mary Kramer
- Succeeded by: Brent Hardt (Chargé d'affaires)

Personal details
- Born: Mary Martin; February 27, 1946 (age 80) Texas, U.S.
- Party: Republican
- Spouse(s): Bubbe Johnson (Divorced); Steve Stiles (Divorced); Mandy Ourisman (1993–2017); Pete Dawkins (2019–present)
- Education: University of Texas, Austin (BS); Academy of Art University; New York School of Interior Design

Mary Martin Ourisman (born February 27, 1946) is an American political consultant who served as U.S. Ambassador Extraordinary and Plenipotentiary to Barbados and the Eastern Caribbean, comprising the countries of Antigua and Barbuda, Dominica, Grenada, St. Kitts and Nevis, St. Lucia, and St. Vincent and the Grenadines. Mary was married to "Bubba" Johnson, and Steve Stiles previously.

== Biography ==
Ourisman was born to Dr. Herbert and Aleen Martin in Texas, 1946. Her father was a dentist. She graduated from the University of Texas at Austin in 1970 with a Bachelor of Science degree. She also attended the Academy of Arts College in San Francisco and the New York School of Interior Design. She was married on July 9, 2019, to her fourth husband, Brig. Gen. Pete Dawkins. She is divorced from her first husband, Bubba, with whom she has one son, Colbert Johnson. Her second husband whom she also divorced was Steve Stiles. Third husband was Mandy Ourisman.

From June 12, 1993 until his death on July 5, 2017, she was married to Mandell "Mandy" Ourisman, chairman of Ourisman Automotive Enterprises. She is a supporter of the arts, having organized fund raisers and served on numerous boards of directors for arts groups and museums. She was appointed to the Board of Trustees for the Kennedy Center by President Bush, and she sat on the board of trustees for the Washington National Opera. Ourisman was also on the board of directors for the Blair House, serving on the "decorating committee," for the President's guest house for visiting foreign Heads of State. She served on the Smithsonian National Board in 1999. She has also served on the World Wildlife Fund National Council, McCain 2000, the Elizabeth Dole Committee, and George W. Bush for President (2004). The Ourismans have donated $443,620 to GOP candidates and committees since 1999.

President George W. Bush announced his intention to name Ourisman the Ambassador to Barbados and the Eastern Caribbean on July 20, 2006, and submitted his formal nomination to the Senate the next day. The Senate confirmed Ourisman's nomination on September 13, 2006, she was appointed ambassador on October 11, and she arrived at the U.S. Embassy in Bridgetown, Barbados, on October 31.

She is currently involved with the Trust For the National Mall. She has homes in Florida and California.

Diplomatic posts
| Preceded by Mary Kramer | United States Ambassador to Antigua and Barbuda; 2006–2008 | Succeeded by Brent Hardt; Chargé d'affaires |
| Preceded by Mary Kramer | United States Ambassador to Barbados; 2006–2008 | Succeeded by Brent Hardt; Chargé d'affaires |
| Preceded by Mary Kramer | United States Ambassador to Dominica; 2006–2008 | Succeeded by Brent Hardt; Chargé d'affaires |
| Preceded by Mary Kramer | United States Ambassador to Grenada; 2006–2008 | Succeeded by Brent Hardt; Chargé d'affaires |
| Preceded by Mary Kramer | United States Ambassador to Saint Kitts and Nevis; 2006–2008 | Succeeded by Brent Hardt; Chargé d'affaires |
| Preceded by Mary Kramer | United States Ambassador to Saint Lucia; 2007–2008 | Succeeded by Brent Hardt; Chargé d'affaires |
| Preceded by Mary Kramer | United States Ambassador to Saint Vincent and the Grenadines; 2007–2008 | Succeeded by Brent Hardt; Chargé d'affaires |
