= We Invest in Nationhood =

Guyanese political party

- Abbreviation: WIN
- Leader: Azruddin Mohamed
- General Secretary: Odessa Primus
- Founder: Azruddin Mohamed
- Founded: 23 June 2025
- Ideology: Grassroots politics; Populism
- Colours: Blue, white, black
- Seats in the National Assembly: 16 / 65

Website
- www.winguyana.com

We Invest in Nationhood (WIN) is a political party in Guyana. Founded and led by businessman Azruddin Mohamed, the party contested the 2025 Guyanese general election, winning 16 seats and replacing A Partnership for National Unity as the country's main opposition party, breaking a nearly 70 year-long streak of either the APNU-led People's National Congress Reform or the People's Progressive Party/Civic forming government or the official opposition.

== Policies ==
Policies presented in WIN's election manifesto included reductions in value-added tax (VAT), increases in civil servants' wages, and increased welfare spending, as well as a potential renegotiation of terms with ExxonMobil, aimed at securing greater oil revenues for the Guyanese government. France24 described the party as attracting "grassroots support," especially among the lower classes, due to its advocacy for "fairer access to housing and opportunities."

== Controversies ==
Party leader Azruddin Mohamed has attracted significant controversy for his alleged involvement in corrupt public activities including bribery, resulting in sanctions being imposed by the United States Treasury Department on Mohamed, a gold-exporting company that he owns with his father, and a government official. Responding to Mohamed's presidential candidacy, US Ambassador Nicole Theriot warned that the US would cut economic ties if there was a Mohamed administration, stating that the US "would have to make sure that we didn't work with him specifically".

WIN also attracted controversy after posting AI-generated images on social media that were offensive to many users and perceived as racist.

== Election results ==
Election year	Leader	Votes	%	Seats	+/–	Position	Government
2025	Azruddin Mohamed	109,066	24.87	16 / 65	New	▲2nd	PPP/C
