= Perry L. Holloway =

American diplomat

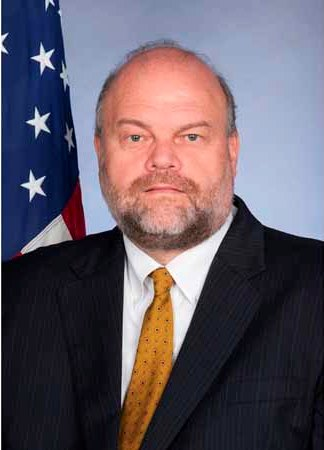
- Perry Holloway in 2015

United States Ambassador to Guyana
- In office October 2, 2015 – December 8, 2018
- President: Barack Obama; Donald Trump
- Preceded by: Brent Hardt
- Succeeded by: Sarah-Ann Lynch

Personal details
- Born: Perry Lee Holloway; 1960 (age 65–66)
- Occupation: Diplomat

Perry Lee Holloway (born 1960) is an American diplomat and was the former Ambassador to the Co-operative Republic of Guyana.

== Career ==
Perry L. Holloway was sworn in as Ambassador to the Cooperative Republic of Guyana on September 18, 2015 and arrived in Guyana on September 24, 2015. Holloway is also the Plenipotentiary Representative accredited to the Caribbean Community (CARICOM). He presented his credentials to the CARICOM Secretariat on October 20, 2015. Holloway served until 8 December 2018, and was succeeded by Sarah-Ann Lynch.

Holloway's previous assignment was the Political-Minister Counselor at the U.S. Embassy in Kabul, Afghanistan (2013-2014) where he worked on negotiations for the Bilateral Security Agreement, Taliban demobilization, the world's largest demining program, and managing the relationship with collation members with respect to funding the Afghan military and police.

Prior to Afghanistan, Holloway served in Bogota, Colombia as Deputy Chief of Mission (2010-2013). During his tenure as DCM, he worked on the bilateral Free Trade Agreement, counternarcotics programs, and helping to bring the Revolutionary Armed Forces of Colombia (FARC; Spanish: Fuerzas Armadas Revolucionarias de Colombia) to the negotiating table for peace talks.

Holloway is a career member of the Senior Foreign Service (SFS), class of Minister-Counselor. His other overseas assignments include Paraguay, Ecuador, El Salvador, Guatemala and Mexico.

Prior to joining the Foreign Service, Holloway worked for Radio Shack in South Carolina and Apple Computers in Mexico City, Mexico.

After his ambassadorship, Holloway started work for Guyana Goldfields.

== Education ==
Holloway earned a B.A. in foreign languages from Wofford College in Spartanburg, South Carolina, an M.A. in International Business Sciences from the University of South Carolina, and an M.A. in National Resources Strategy from the Industrial College of the Armed Forces in Washington, D.C. He is fluent in Spanish.

== Personal ==
Holloway was born in Kentucky and grew up in North Augusta, South Carolina. He is married to Rosaura Holloway and has two children, Paula and Nicholas.
