= Clint Arlen Lauderdale =

American diplomat

Clint Arlen Lauderdale (September 14, 1932 – December 11, 2009) was an American diplomat who served as the United States Ambassador Extraordinary and Plenipotentiary to Guyana from 1984 to 1987. He died of chronic obstructive pulmonary disease on December 11, 2009.

== Sources ==
- Nomination of Clint Arlen Lauderdale To Be United States Ambassador to Guyana

Diplomatic posts
Preceded by Gerald Eustis Thomas	U.S. Ambassador to Guyana; 1984-1987	Succeeded by Theresa Anne Tull
