= Guyana–United States relations =

- Guyana: United States

Bilateral relations have been established between Guyana and the United States of America.

== History ==
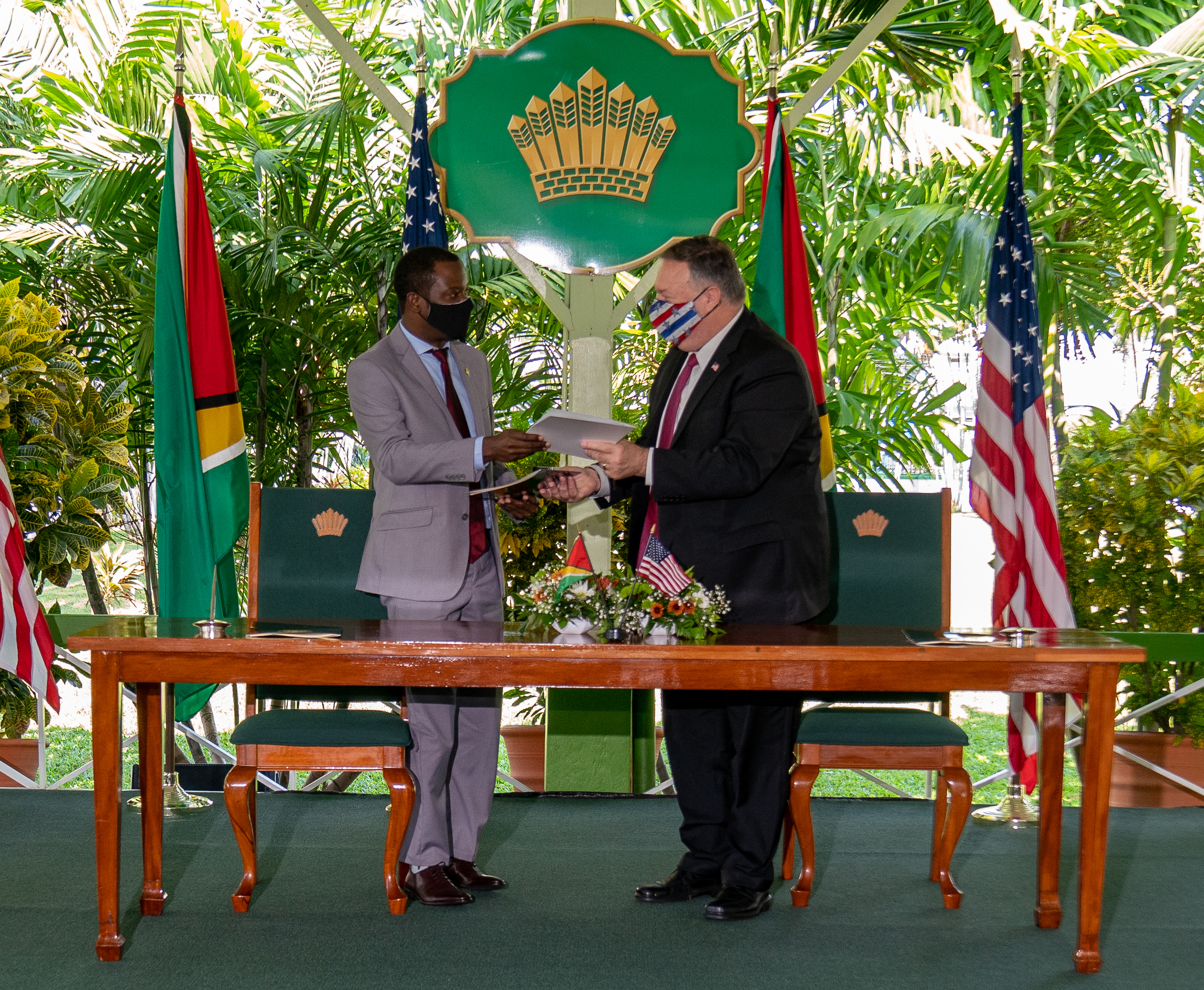
Guyanese foreign minister Hugh Todd (left) and US Secretary of State Mike Pompeo (right) at a signing ceremony in Georgetown, Guyana in 2020 during the COVID-19 pandemic

=== 20th century ===
In the 1970s, the United States opposed the policies of Guyana; the United States ceased economic aid, prevented World Bank loans to Guyana and sided with Venezuela in the Essequibo territory dispute.

U.S. policy toward Guyana seeks to develop robust, sustainable democratic institutions, laws, and political practices; support economic growth and development; and promote stability and security. During the last years of his administration, President Hoyte sought to improve relations with the United States as part of a decision to move his country toward genuine political nonalignment. Relations also were improved by Hoyte's efforts to respect human rights, invite international observers for the 1992 elections, and reform electoral laws. The United States also welcomed the Hoyte government's economic reform and efforts, which stimulated investment and growth. The 1992 democratic elections and Guyana's reaffirmation of sound economic policies and respect for human rights have benefited U.S.-Guyanese relations. Under successive PPP governments, the United States and Guyana continued to improve relations. President Cheddi Jagan was committed to democracy, adopted more free market policies, and pursued sustainable development for Guyana's environment. President Jagdeo is continuing on that course, and the United States maintains positive relations with the current government.

=== 21st century ===
In an effort to combat the spread of HIV/AIDS in The Co-operative Republic of Guyana, the U.S. Centers for Disease Control and Prevention (CDC) opened an office at the U.S. Embassy in 2002. In January 2003, The Cooperative Republic of Guyana was named as one of only two countries in the Western Hemisphere to be included in President Bush's Emergency Plan for AIDS Relief. CDC, in coordination with the U.S. Agency for International Development (USAID), is administering a 5-year multimillion-dollar program of education, prevention, and treatment for those infected and affected by the disease. The Cooperative Republic of Guyana was a threshold country in the Millennium Challenge Account developmental program.

U.S. military medical and engineering teams continue to conduct training exercises in Guyana, digging wells, building schools and clinics, and providing medical treatment.

In September 2020, in a joint statement with the U.S. Secretary of State Mike Pompeo, President Irfaan Ali said the two countries would begin joint maritime patrols aimed at drug interdiction near Guyana's disputed border with crisis-stricken Venezuela. The agreement came as U.S. oil major Exxon Mobil Corp, as part of a consortium with Hess Corporation, ramped up crude output from Guyana's massive offshore Stabroek block, a large portion of which is in waters claimed by Venezuela. Pompeo and Ali added that "greater security, greater capacity to understand your border space, what's happening inside your Exclusive Economic Zone - those are all things that give Guyana sovereignty."

In March 2025, U.S. Secretary of State Marco Rubio visited Guyana as part of a Caribbean tour, aiming to promote energy independence and curb illegal migration, drug trafficking, and gang violence. The visit highlighted Guyana's significant offshore oil reserves, which are key to U.S. efforts to reduce reliance on Venezuelan energy.

== U.S. embassy officials ==
Principal U.S. Embassy Officials include:

- Ambassador: Nicole D. Theriot
- Deputy Chief of Mission: Adrienne Galanek
- Management Officer: James Grounds
- Political/Econ Chief: D. James Bjorkman
- Public Affairs Officer: Amanda Cauldwell
- Chief, Consular Affairs: Nazima Razick
- Regional Security Officer: William Noone
- HHS/CDC Country Director: Rachal Albalak
- Military Liaison Office Commander: LCDR. Michael A. White
- Peace Corps Country Director: Linda Arbogast
- USAID Country Director: Christopher Cushing

== Diplomatic missions ==
The U.S. Embassy in Guyana is located in Georgetown.

== See also ==
- Union of South American Nations
- Free Trade Area of the Americas
- Third Border Initiative
- Caribbean Community
- Caribbean Basin Initiative (CBI)
- Caribbean Basin Trade Partnership Act
- Western Hemisphere Travel Initiative
- Foreign relations of the United States
- Foreign relations of Guyana
- Jonestown
- Leo Ryan
