= Gerald Eustis Thomas =

American diplomat

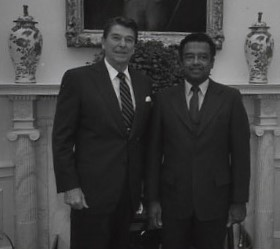
- Gerald Thomas pictured with Ronald Reagan in 1982
- Born: June 23, 1929; Natick, Massachusetts, U.S.
- Died: March 20, 2019 (aged 89); New Haven, Connecticut, U.S.
- Military career
- Allegiance: United States
- Branch: United States Navy
- Service years: 1951–1981
- Rank: Rear Admiral
- Commands: USS Impervious (MSO-449); USS Bausell (DD-845); Commander Cruiser Destroyer Group Nine; Commander Cruiser Destroyer Group Five
- Conflicts: Vietnam War
- Awards: Navy Commendation Medal with Combat V Meritorious Service Medal

Gerald Eustis Thomas (June 23, 1929 – March 20, 2019), was an American naval officer, diplomat and academic. He was the second African American to achieve the rank of Rear Admiral in the U.S. Navy.

== Early life ==
Thomas was born in Natick, Massachusetts, the son of Walter W. and Leila L. (née Jacobs) Thomas. He was educated at Natick High School, going on to spend a year studying at the University of Nebraska–Lincoln before transferring to Harvard University. He graduated from Harvard in 1951 with a Bachelor of Arts in biochemical sciences.

== Naval career ==
During his time at Harvard, Thomas was a member of the Naval Reserve Officers Training Corps and joined the Navy after graduation. He was commissioned as an ensign on June 1, 1951, serving aboard USS Newman K. Perry (DDR-883) for three years, barring three months spent at the Destroyer Force, US Atlantic Fleet Engineering School in Newport, Rhode Island. In July 1954, he transferred to USS Worcester (CL-144).

While assigned to the Worcester, he attended the Combat Information Center Watch Officer and Day Air Control School in Boston, Massachusetts. He then learned to speak Russian at the Defense Language Institute, qualifying as an interpreter in 1957 and serving at the National Security Agency in Fort Meade.

In June 1960 he was appointed executive officer aboard USS Lowe (DER-325), and two years later, in February 1962, he was given his first command - that of USS Impervious (MSO-449). The following year he became commander of the College Training Program at the Bureau of Naval Personnel. In 1965 he was back in the Naval War College in Newport, where he was chosen as the 1965-66 Distinguished Graduate of the School of Naval Command and Staff.

In August 1966 he was given command of USS Bausell (DD-845) and saw active service in the Vietnam War. As a result of meritorious service between March 31 and October 15, 1967, he was awarded the Navy Commendation Medal with Combat V. Back on dry land, in April 1968, he became executive officer of the Naval Reserve Officers Training Corps unit at Prairie View A&M College in Texas and was awarded the Meritorious Service Medal.

In 1973 he took command of Destroyer Squadron 9, concluding this command with his appointment as Rear Admiral in November 1974. He was the second African American to achieve this landmark, preceded only by Admiral Samuel L. Gravely, Jr. The newly promoted rear admiral became commander of Destroyer Squadron 5 before in 1975 becoming the acting Deputy Assistant Secretary of Defense for International Security Affairs, and then the Director of the Near East, South Asia and Africa region at the U.S. Department of Defense in the following year. From 1978 he served as the senior rear admiral on the U.S. Pacific Fleet before retiring from the Navy in 1981.

== Diplomatic career ==
Ronald Reagan appointed Thomas Ambassador United States Ambassador to Guyana on December 11, 1981. Thomas left Guyana on September 6, 1983, and was appointed Ambassador to Kenya a month later. He served in this capacity until leaving the diplomatic service on September 29, 1989.

== Academic career ==
Thomas continued to study throughout his naval career, gaining a Master of Science degree from George Washington University in 1966, and a Ph.D. in diplomatic history from Yale University in 1973. On returning from Kenya, he joined the faculty at Yale, teaching in the African American Studies program and the history department. Thomas's relationship with his students was an important factor in his selection as Master of Davenport College in 1991. Thomas served in this capacity for 10 years before retiring in July 2001.

Thomas is a member of Alpha Phi Alpha fraternity.

== Personal life and death ==
He is married to Rhoda (née Henderson), and the couple have two sons and a daughter. He died on March 20, 2019, in New Haven, Connecticut at the age of 89.

Diplomatic posts
Preceded by George Roberts, Jr.	U.S. Ambassador to Guyana; 1981-1983	Succeeded by Clint Arlen Lauderdale
Preceded by William Caldwell Harrop	U.S. Ambassador to Kenya; 1983–1989	Succeeded by Elinor Greer Constable
