= Guyana–India relations =

- Guyana: India

Relations between India and Guyana ever since the independence of Guyana in May 1966 have been cordial. The cordiality in the relation remains unaffected with changes in governments either in India or in Guyana. Late Shrimati Indira Gandhi, the then Prime Minister of India, visited Guyana in 1968, late Dr. Shankar Dayal Sharma, the then Vice President of India visited Guyana in 1988 and Shri Bhairon Singh Shekhawat, the then Vice President of India came on a state visit to Guyana in 2006.

Both countries were once part of the British Empire and are members of the Commonwealth of Nations.

== Economic co-operation ==
The cooperation between the two countries in sharing developmental experience is mainly routed through Indian Technical & Economic Cooperation (ITEC) under which forty scholarships are granted every year in various courses. India imported $148 million worth of oil from Guyana in 2021-22, a number which is "expected to multiply geometrically" according to Harshil Mehta, Indian columnist on international relations. India has earlier also donated two aircraft to Guyana Defence Force.

== Cultural connections ==
With the advent of the Indian Premier League, many Guyanese players were contracted to play in India. There is also a religious connection as Hindus make up to 30% of Guyana population and most of them are of Indian origin.

Commenting on cultural connections, Indian columnist Harshil Mehta noted that "Indo-Guyanese relations, rooted in history, require enhanced cooperation and strategic understanding to unlock mutual benefits."

== High commissioners ==
=== Guyana to India ===
- Ronald Gajraj, 2005-2015

=== India to Guyana ===
List of High Commissioners of India to Republic of Guyana
S.J. Wilfred	March 1967	June 1969
D. Hajmadi	December 1969	September 1972
Gopal Singh	November 1972	August 1976
P. Johari	September 1976	March 1979
J.N. Bhat	September 1979	December 1982
G. Wakankar	January 1983	July 1986
G.D. Atuk	December 1986	June 1989
R. Rajagopalan	August 1989	November 1992
P.L. Goyal	April 1993	June 1994
Narendra Kumar	August 1994	August 1996
P.V. Joshi	August 1998	September 2002
Tara Singh	November 2002	August 2003
Avinash Gupta	August 2003	October 2007
S.K. Mandal	November 2007	February 2012
P.M. Meena	May 2012	January 2014
V. Mahalingam	June 2014	July 2019
K.J. Srinivasa	August 2019	August 2023
Amit Telang	October 2023	Incumbent

== See also ==
- Foreign relations of Guyana
- Foreign relations of India
- List of Indo-Guyanese People
