= Brazil–Guyana relations =

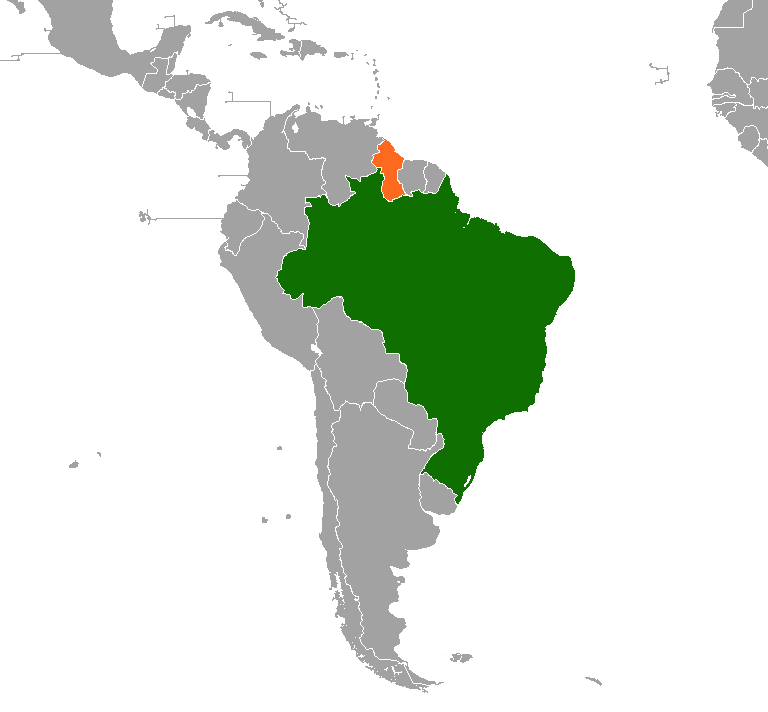

- Brazil: Guyana

Brazil–Guyana relations have traditionally been close. Brazil has provided military assistance to Guyana in the form of warfare training and logistics. Bilateral relations between the countries have recently increased, as a result of Brazil's new South–South foreign policy aimed to strengthen South American integration.

During a state visit by Brazilian President Luiz Inácio Lula da Silva to Georgetown on 2 March 2007, the governments of Guyana and Brazil signed several cooperation agreements and announced plans to boost trade between the two countries.

== History ==
The earliest diplomatic efforts between Guyana and Brazil were to establish the borders between the major colonial powers, in 1904 an arbitral decision divided disputed territorial claims between Brazil and Britain and 1936, the Tri-junction Point Agreement established the border between Brazil, Suriname and British Guiana.

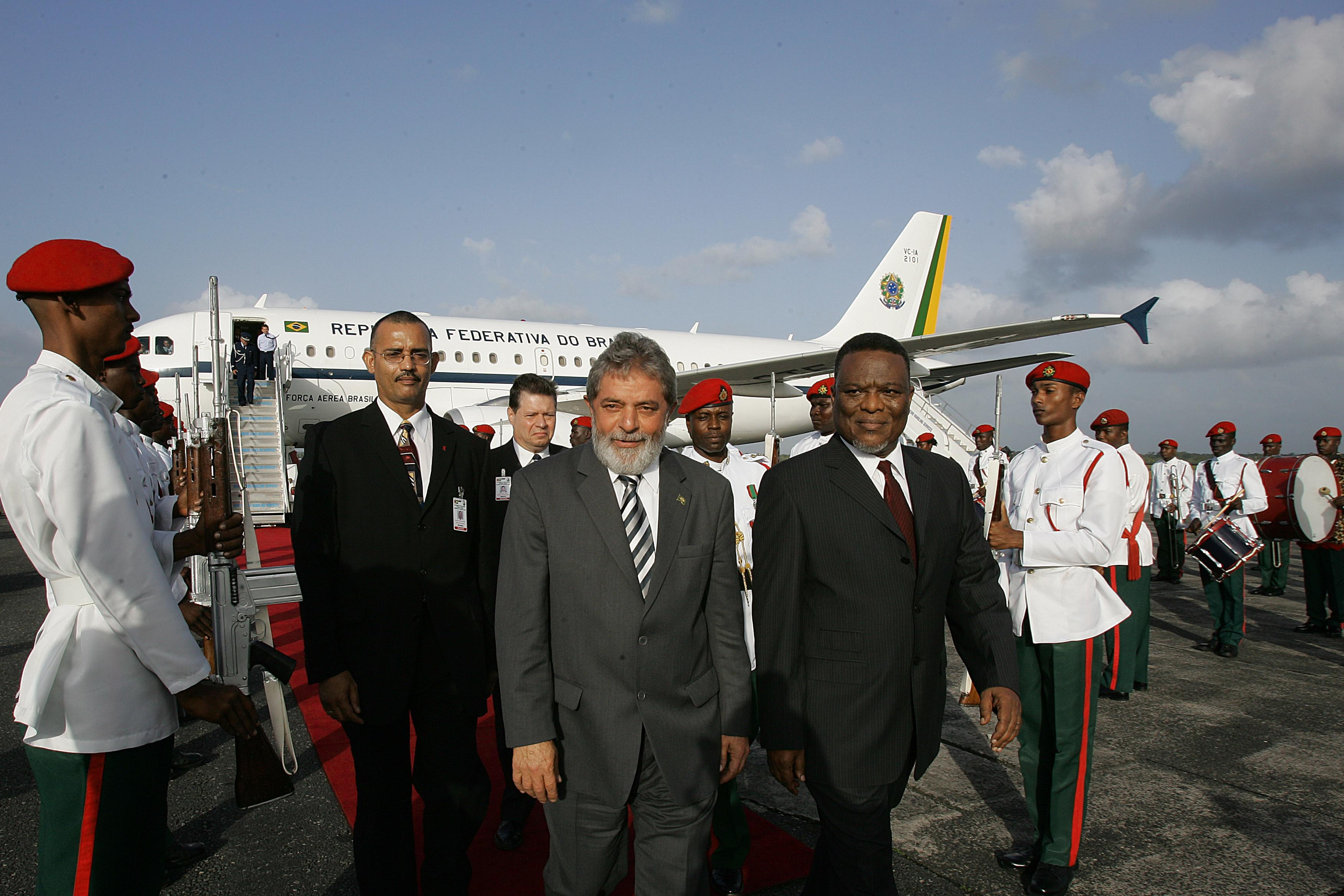
President Lula's official visit to Guyana, March 2007

After Guyanese independence in 1966 there was intense diplomatic activity with Brazil. In the case of Guyana's border with Venezuela, Brazil maintained a consistent policy in favour of the sanctity of established international borders through arbitration agreements and opposed any change of borders in the South American continent. In 1968, immediately after Venezuelan President Raul Leoni decreed "ownership" of a nine-mile strip of ocean off Guyana's three-mile territorial sea limits, the Brazilian government showed support to Guyana in the controversy with Venezuela.

On 26 August 1968 Deputy Prime Minister Ptolemy Reid visited Brazil for discussions with leaders of the Brazilian government. As a result, the Brazilian government announced the opening of a Brazilian embassy in Georgetown.

In 1975, the United States alleged that Guyana was allowing Cuban troops to refuel in Guyana en route to the Angolan civil war. The Brazilian military government was staunchly anti-communist, and it briefly undertook military maneuvers on its border with Guyana. In November 2002, it was reported that Brazil had carried out a military operation in the region of Guyana claimed by Suriname, to destroy several airstrips used by drug traffickers. The Brazilian government did not confirm the story, but insisted that if it had been carried out it would have been done with Guyana's permission.

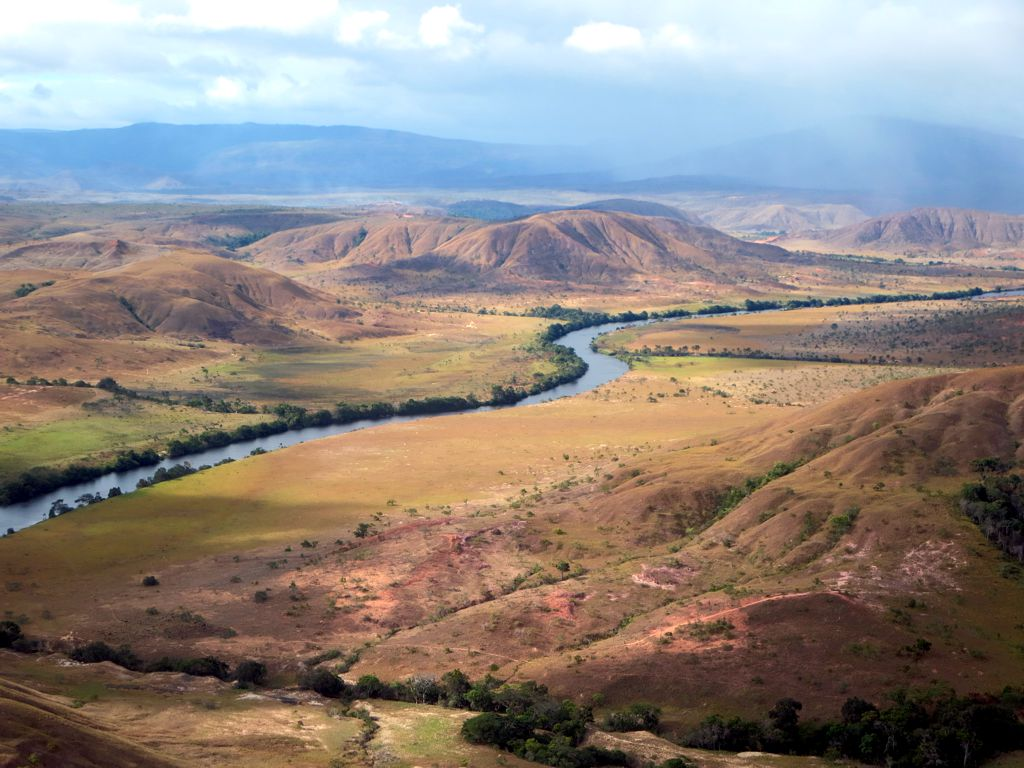
Aerial view of the Guyanese-Brazilian border along the Rio Maú/Ireng River

== Cooperation ==
Creating an overland link to the Caribbean has been a long-standing point of interest between both countries, Brazil wanting an overland link to the Caribbean and Guyana having easy access to Brazilian markets. In 1982, an agreement was signed by President Forbes Burnham and his counterpart President João Figueiredo with the goal of linking Boa Vista and Georgetown. In 1989, Guyana's next president, Desmond Hoyte worked out financing with President José Sarney, using a Brazilian construction firm to build the highway. In 2003, another series of agreements were signed by President Bharrat Jagdeo also included a deep harbour project.

In 2009, the Takutu River Bridge was the first land connection between Brazil and Guyana. In 2012, Guyana joined MERCOSUR as an Associate State; Brazil was already a full member.

In 2016, during the commemorations of the 50th anniversary of Guyana's independence, the Brazilian government officially changed the way it spelled the name of its neighbouring country, from the colonial form Guiana, with an "i", to the post-independence, official form "Guyana".

The Brazil–Guyana Joint Commission for Infrastructure Development was created in 2017 during President David Granger's visit to Brazil.

Festa Junina is hosted at the Brazilian embassy in Georgetown every year with the Brazil–Guyana Cultural Centre which promotes Brazilian culture through Portuguese language classes and other cultural activities.

== Resident diplomatic missions ==
Of Brazil

- Georgetown (Embassy)
- Lethem (Vice-Consulate)

Of Guyana

- Brasília (Embassy)
- Boa Vista (Consulate-General)

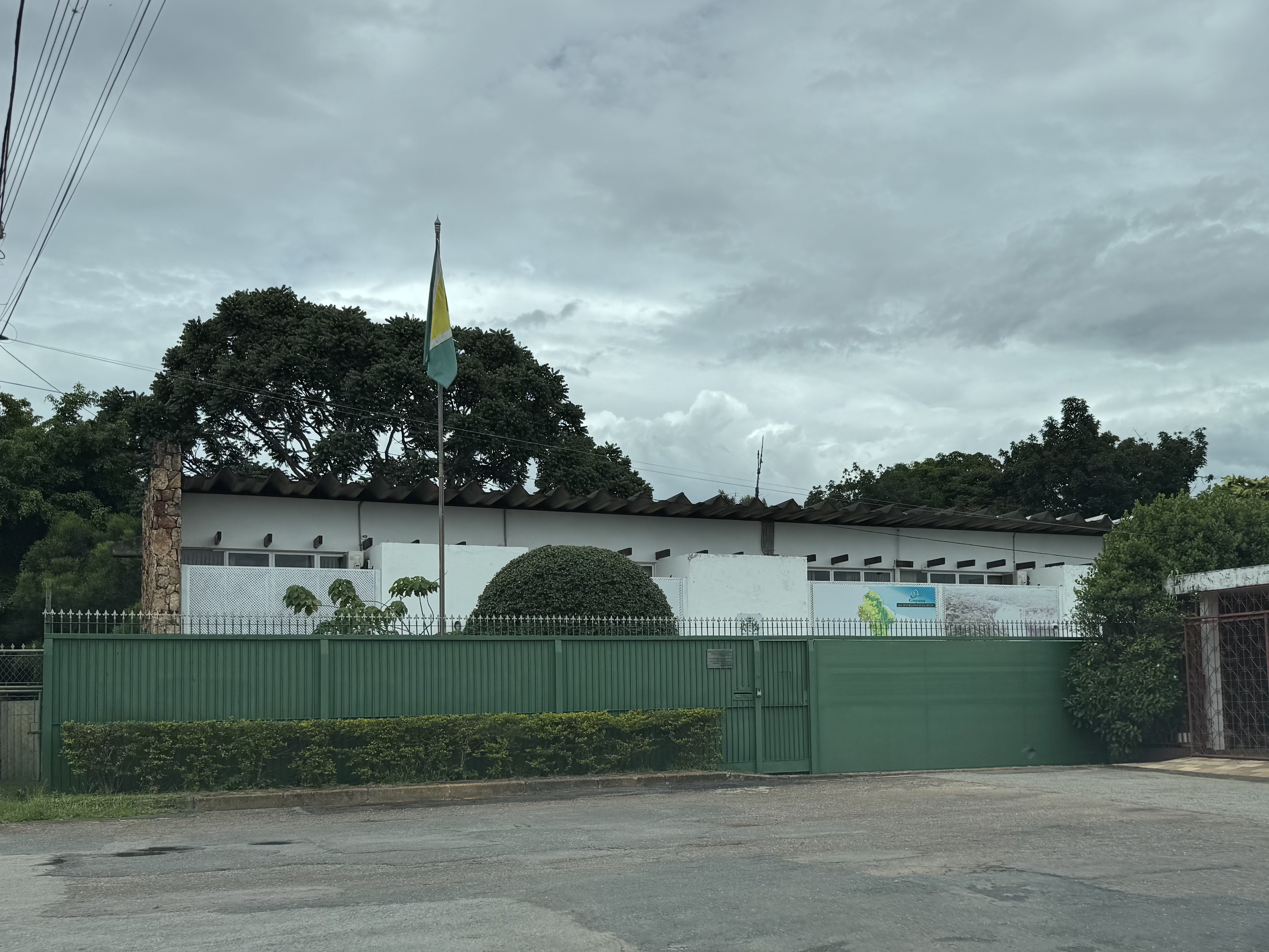
Embassy of Guyana in Brasília

== See also ==
- Foreign relations of Brazil
- Foreign relations of Guyana
- Union of South American Nations
