= Germany–Guyana relations =

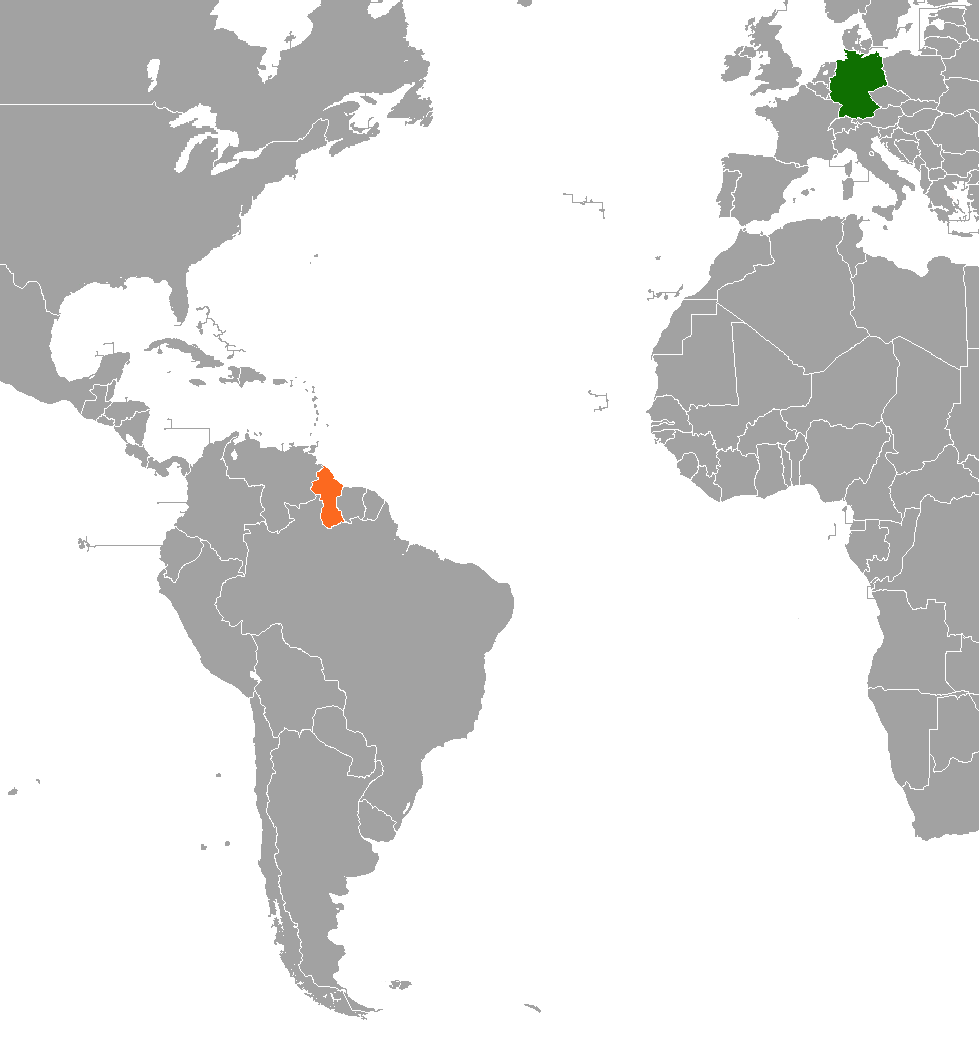

- Germany: Guyana

Germany–Guyana relations are the bilateral relations between Germany and Guyana.

== Diplomatic relations ==
Since the year of Guyana's independence, 1966, diplomatic relations have existed with the Federal Republic of Germany and later Reunited Germany. On September 16, 2016, the 50th anniversary of mutual relations was celebrated.

== Diplomatic missions ==
Germany does not maintain an embassy in Guyana; the German Embassy in Port of Spain, Trinidad and Tobago is accredited for Guyana. Guyana does not maintain an embassy in Germany. The embassy in Brussels in Belgium is responsible for relations with Germany.

== Economy and development ==
In 1994, a bilateral agreement was concluded to protect and promote investment. Relations continue between Germany and the Caribbean Community (CARICOM), of which Guyana is a member. In particular, projects are being pursued to promote the economy and protect the environment. In 2005, the G8 countries agreed to debt relief for numerous countries, which included Guyana.

In development policy, funding for ecological and environmental projects have priority. Thus Germany finances u. a. Projects for rainforest protection, like the "Guyana Protected Areas System", since 1998.

== See also ==
- Foreign relations of Germany
- Foreign relations of Guyana
