= Leader of the Opposition (Guyana) =

Parliamentary representation of the Guyanese non-ruling parties

Leader of the Opposition is a constitutionally sanctioned office in Guyana. The Leader of the Opposition is elected among non-governmental members of the National Assembly of Guyana. Usually the person comes from the largest opposition group in the National Assembly.

The position was first established in 1966 by the Constitution of Guyana. Historically the leader was appointed by Governor-General of Guyana.

== Leaders of the Opposition ==
Portrait	Name	Took office	Left office	Notes
	Cheddi Jagan	1966	1973	
	Marcellus Fielden Singh	1974	1976	
	Cheddi Jagan	1976	1980	
	Cheddi Jagan	1980	1992	Designated as Minority Leader
	Desmond Hoyte	1992	2000	Designated as Minority Leader
	Desmond Hoyte	2000	2002	
	Robert Corbin	2002	2012	
	David A. Granger	2012	2015	
	Bharrat Jagdeo	2015	2020	
	Joseph Harmon	2020	2022	
	Aubrey Norton	2022	2025	
	Azruddin Mohamed	2026	Present	

== See also ==
- Politics of Guyana
- President of Guyana
- Prime Minister of Guyana
