= John R. Burke =

United States ambassador (1924–1993)

United States Ambassador to Guyana
- In office September 30, 1977 – September 29, 1979
- President: Jimmy Carter
- Preceded by: Max V. Krebs
- Succeeded by: George B. Roberts Jr.

Personal details
- Born: John Richard Burke; December 7, 1924 Madison, Wisconsin, US
- Died: August 7, 1993 (aged 68) Arlington, Virginia, US
- Resting place: Arlington National Cemetery
- Spouse: Amelie Cecillion Burke
- Occupation: United States Ambassador

John Richard Burke (December 7, 1924 – August 7, 1993) was a Foreign Service officer and the United States Ambassador to Guyana during the Jonestown Massacre.

Born in Madison, Wisconsin in 1924, Burke was a Lieutenant Commander in the United States Navy during World War II. He also served during the Korean War.

After his Korean service, he earned a master's degree from the University of Wisconsin–Madison.

Burke was the Ambassador to Guyana from September 30, 1977, to September 22, 1979.

Burke died of a heart attack on August 7, 1993, at his home in Arlington, Virginia. His ashes were interred at Arlington National Cemetery.

== See also ==
- Ambassadors from the United States

Diplomatic posts
Preceded by Max V. Krebs	United States Ambassador to Guyana; September 30, 1977 – September 22, 1979	Succeeded by George B. Roberts, Jr.
