= Guyana–Russia relations =

Bilateral relations

- Guyana: Russia

Guyana–Russia relations are the bilateral relations between the Russian Federation and Guyana. Officially established in 1970, Russia has an embassy in Georgetown, and Guyana's non-resident ambassador to Russia is located in London.

In 2005, both countries signed an agreement for visa-free travel for holders of diplomatic and service passports between the countries, and in 2010 Guyana unilaterally cancelled visa requirements for the Russian citizens.

== Soviet-era relations ==
Cheddi Jagan, a Marxist Socialist politician early in his career held communist countries in a positive light. His involvement with Soviet-allied countries since the 1950s attracted attention from Britain and the US during the Cold War.

The Soviet Union and Guyana established diplomatic relations on 17 December 1970.

In October 1985, the Soviet Union delivered three Mil Mi-8 helicopters to Georgetown for use by the Guyana Defence Force. In the 1980s Guyana Airways operated a Tupolev Tu-154 passenger jet on lease from TAROM of Romania, and purchased three additional Tu-154s from the Soviet Union and Romania in a barter deal in exchange for bauxite.

== Russian Federation relations ==
=== Diplomatic ties ===
On 8 January 1992, Guyana recognised the Russian Federation as the successor state to the Soviet Union, after the latter's dissolution. Russia has an embassy in Georgetown, and Guyana covers Russia from its High Commission in London.

=== Economic ties ===
Many Guyanese students have gone abroad to Russia for higher education. In 2003, Peoples' Friendship University of Russia and University of Guyana signed agreement on cooperation. The Guyana Police Force was also provided short term training in Russia.

In January 2006, Rusal reached an agreement with the government of Guyana to purchase 90% of the Aroaima Mining Company, leaving the government with a ten percent share. The deal, according to Rusal, invested US$20 million in the bauxite mine, with mines in Berbice.

== Ambassadors ==
=== Russian ambassadors to Guyana ===
- Pavel Sergiyev, appointed 27 July 2007
- Nikolay Smirnov, 2015
- Alexander S. Kurmaz, appointed December 2017 and non-resident ambassador of Barbados, Grenada, Saint Vincent, and Trinidad and Tobago (previous diplomatic service in Benin, India and Germany.)

=== Guyanese ambassadors to Russia ===
- Laleshwar Singh, appointed 20 June 1995
- Hamley Case, appointed 2018

== See also ==
- Foreign relations of Russia
- Foreign relations of Guyana
- List of Guyanese High Commissioners to the United Kingdom
