= Guyana–Trinidad and Tobago relations =

Guyana-Trinidadian relations
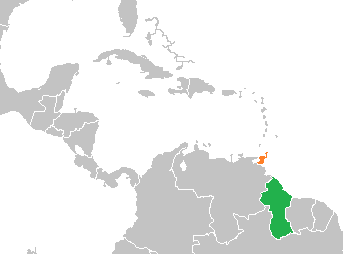

- Guyana: Trinidad and Tobago

Guyana–Trinidad and Tobago relations refers to the bilateral relations between the Republic of Guyana and the Republic of Trinidad and Tobago. Guyana has a High Commission in Port of Spain and Trinidad and Tobago has High Commission in Georgetown. Both nations are a part of CARICOM, a political union of Caribbean countries and Organization of American States. Guyana borders Trinidad and Tobago by a sea border in the Caribbean Sea.

== History ==
The two nations share many similarities with each other due to their similar culture, linguistic usage, religions and both being a part of the British Empire at some point in their history. Both countries are a part of the Commonwealth of Nations and CARICOM. On May 26, 1966, formal diplomatic relations were established between the two nations. In the 1970s, Trinidad and Tobago continued to provide petroleum to Guyana on credit despite their economic shortfall. Several thousands Guyanese came to Trinidad and Tobago to work during the 1970s. In the 1990s, under the Paris Club Agreement, Trinidad and Tobago forgave hundred of millions of US dollars' worth of debt that Guyana owed. In 2017, Guyana opened its first diplomatic mission to Trinidad and Tobago. In 2018, the two nations signed a memorandum of understanding on energy to further allow cooperation between the two nations on energy needs and exchange resources.

== Sports ==
Both countries are part of the multi-national West Indies cricket team, with several players from both countries representing the board.

== Trade ==
Trinidad and Tobago exports US$417 Million to Guyana in 2017 and Guyana exported US$204 Million to Trinidad and Tobago.

== High commissioners ==
=== Guyanese high commissioner to Trinidad and Tobago ===
- Bishwaishwar Ramsaroop -2019

== See also ==
- Foreign relations of Guyana
- Foreign relations of Trinidad and Tobago
