= Sarah-Ann Lynch =

American diplomat

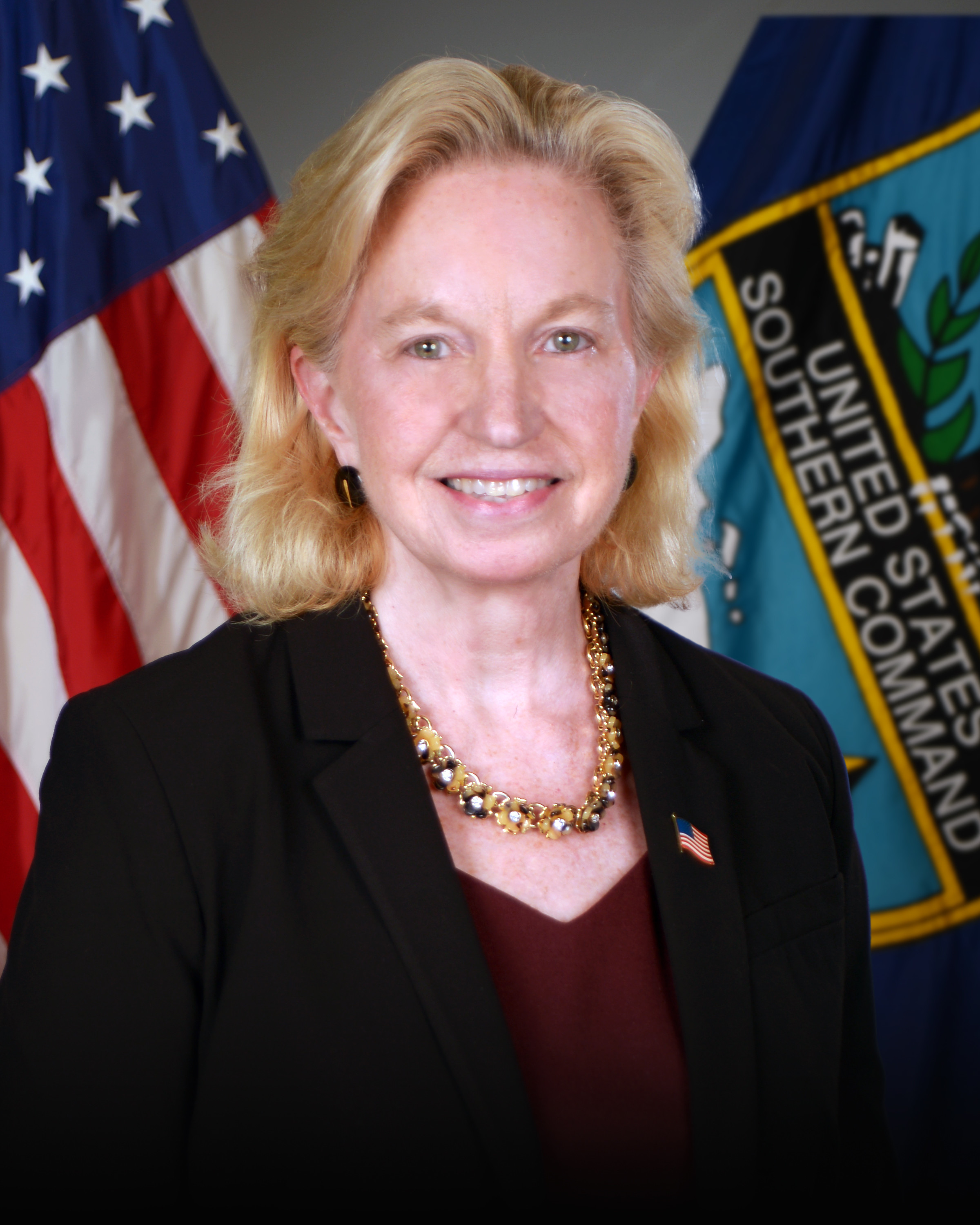

United States Ambassador to Guyana
- In office March 13, 2019 – September 12, 2023
- President: Donald Trump; Joe Biden
- Preceded by: Perry L. Holloway
- Succeeded by: Nicole Theriot

Personal details
- Spouse: Kevin Healy
- Children: Mariah Healy, Garrett Healy, Dylan Healy
- Education: Mount Holyoke College; Tufts University; National War College

Sarah-Ann Lynch is an American diplomat who served as United States ambassador to Guyana from 2019 to 2023. She was nominated by President Donald Trump on September 13, 2018, and presented her credentials on March 13, 2019, to President David Granger. Lynch was confirmed by the U.S. Senate on January 2, and was sworn in on January 11, 2019.

== Early life and education ==
Lynch earned her B.A. from Mount Holyoke College, an M.A.L.D. degree from the Fletcher School of Law and Diplomacy at Tufts University, and an M.S. from the National War College.

== Career ==
Lynch served as a Peace Corps volunteer in Morocco, where she taught English at the secondary level. After joining the Foreign Service in 1993, Lynch held overseas assignments in Peru and Bangladesh. She served as director in USAID/LAC's Office of Strategy and Program Planning and the Office of South American Affairs. From 2008 to 2009, she was director of the Office of Program and Project Development for USAID Afghanistan. Lynch then became the director of USAID's Office of Iraq and Arabian Peninsula Affairs from 2011 to 2013. From 2013 to 2014, she was USAID Mission Director in Iraq. She then became senior deputy assistant administrator and acting assistant administrator of USAID's Bureau for Latin America and the Caribbean.

=== Ambassador To Guyana ===
Ambassador Lynch served as Ambassador to the Co-operative Republic of Guyana from 2019 to 2023. A career diplomat, Lynch was appointed by President Donald Trump as a non-political appointee, meaning she does not have ties to a political party. Sarah-Ann Lynch was confirmed by the U.S. Senate on January 2, 2019, and sworn in on January 7, 2019, as Ambassador to the Co-operative Republic of Guyana. She presented her credentials in Guyana on March 13, 2019. During Lynch's tenure she was highly regarded as an effective diplomat and played an important role in U.S. relations in the Caribbean.

Lynch played a critical role in the development of Guyana since she took office and continues to build and strengthen bilateral relations between Guyana and the United States of America. The US Ambassador had also played a keen role in the March 2020 General and Regional Elections.

=== Civilian Deputy to the Commander U.S. Southern Command ===
Ambassador Sarah-Ann Lynch assumed duties as Civilian Deputy to the Commander and Foreign Policy Advisor, U.S. Southern Command, Miami, FL, in December 2023. As Civilian Deputy to the Commander, she is responsible for overseeing the Command’s Human Rights and Women, Peace, and Security programs, and building trust and strengthening relations with foreign and interagency partners. She also plays a proactive role in message development and strategic communication, driving integration, alignment, and collaboration across the USSOUTHCOM enterprise and with interagency partners. As Foreign Policy Advisor, Ambassador Lynch provides the Commander and other senior command staff with geo-political, political-military, and economic counsel. She also leads the Command's relationship with the Department of State and U.S. Embassies abroad.

== Personal life ==
Lynch speaks Arabic, French, and Spanish. Lynch is married to her husband Dr. Kevin Healy, DDS and has three children; Mariah Healy, Garrett Healy and Dylan Healy.

== See also ==
- List of ambassadors appointed by Donald Trump
