= Joseph Harmon =

Guyanese politician

The Honourable Joseph Harmon MP MSM
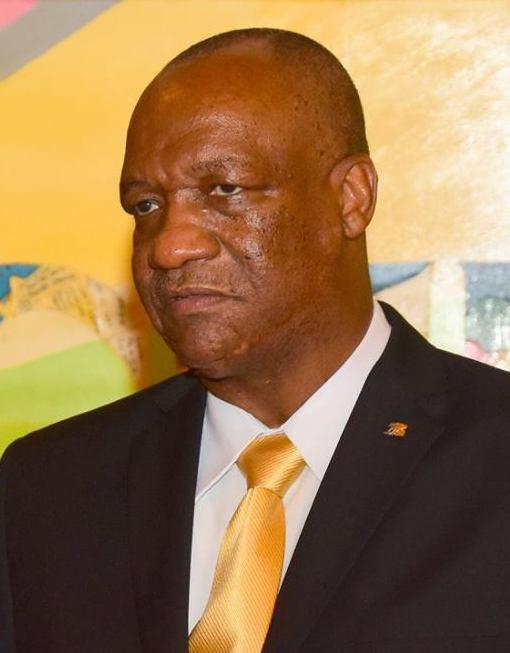
- Harmon in 2016

Leader of the Opposition of Guyana
- In office 2 September 2020 – April 2022
- Leader: David Granger; Aubrey Norton
- Preceded by: Bharrat Jagdeo
- Succeeded by: Aubrey Norton

Member of the National Assembly
- Incumbent
- Assumed office 12 January 2012
- Constituency: National Top-Up

Personal details
- Party: PNC

Joseph F. Harmon is a Guyanese politician who served as Leader of the Opposition from 2020 to 2022. He previously served as Director-General of the Ministry of the Presidency, under the David Granger administration.

Harmon was born in Pouderoyen, a village in the West Demerara region. Harmon is a former Lt. Col in the Guyana Defence Force and attorney at law.

As opposition leader, Harmon disputed the legitimacy of President Irfaan Ali and his government, and Ali refused to meet with Harmon. This resulted in a vacancy in the chancellor and chief justice positions, as filling these positions required agreement between the president and the opposition leader. He argued that David A. Granger was the legitimate president, contradicting the consensus of both local and international election observers.

In June 2021, a motion of no confidence was filed against Harmon due to his claims that the APNU and AFC coalition won the 2020 General Election.

Harmon was a candidate for leadership of the People's National Congress but lost to long-time member and political activist Aubrey Norton.
