= Spencer Matthews King =

American diplomat (1917–1988)

United States Ambassador to Guyana
- In office 1969–1974
- President: Richard Nixon

Personal details
- Born: August 11, 1917 San Juan, Puerto Rico
- Died: January 20, 1988 (aged 70)
- Profession: diplomatic corps

Spencer Matthews King (August 11, 1917 – January 20, 1988) was a U.S. Ambassador to Guyana. Appointed by President Richard Nixon on May 27, 1969, he presented his credentials to Governor-General Sir Richard Edmonds Luyt on October 15, 1969, in the capital city of Georgetown. After Guyana declared itself a republic in 1970, Ambassador King had to be reaccredited as ambassador, this time presenting his credentials to the republic's new president, Sir Edward Victor Luckhoo on February 23, 1970. He represented the United States and its interests in this former British colony until March 8, 1974, when he left the post. A longtime resident of Maine, he retired from the foreign service after his ambassadorship came to an end. He died on January 20, 1988.

Diplomatic posts
Preceded by Delmar R. Carlson	U.S. Ambassador to Guyana; 1969–1974	Succeeded by Max V. Krebs
