= James Mack (academic) =

American chemist

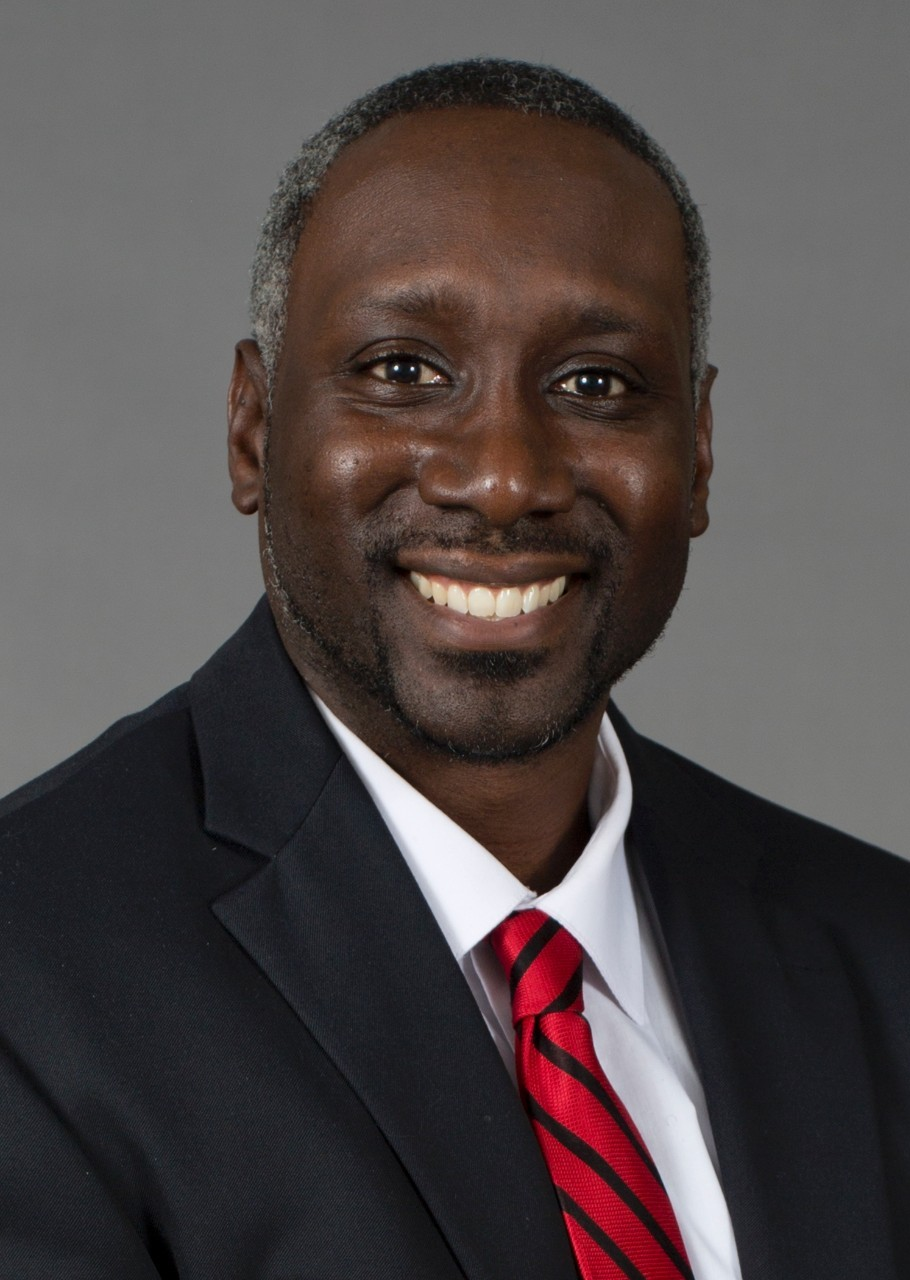
James Mack, PhD

James Mack is an American chemist and a professor of chemistry at the University of Cincinnati, also currently the Dean of the College of Arts & Sciences at the same university since the summer of 2023.

== Career ==
James Mack's academic career has been marked by a commitment to advancing the field of chemistry through innovative research and educational initiatives. His contributions have earned him recognition and respect within the scientific community. Some of the key highlights of his academic career include:

Joining the University of Cincinnati: In 2003, James Mack joined the faculty at the University of Cincinnati's Arts & Sciences, where he has held various positions, including Associate Professor of Chemistry, Associate Dean of Chemistry, Divisional Dean of Natural Sciences, and Dean of the College of Arts & Sciences. He has been an instrumental figure in shaping the direction of the chemistry department and advancing the university's research mission.

Mechanochemistry Pioneer: Mack is renowned for his groundbreaking work in mechanochemistry, a field that explores chemical reactions initiated and controlled by mechanical forces. His research has shed light on the fundamental principles of mechanochemistry and its applications in various domains. In addition to his own work on mechanochemistry, James Mack also serves as an Editorial Board member for Royal Society of Chemistry: Mechanochemistry.

Mechanocatalysis Pioneer: James Mack is recognized as one of the first researchers to report on mechanocatalysis, a subfield of mechanochemistry that explores the use of mechanical forces to catalyze chemical reactions.

Advocate for Diversity: Throughout his career, Mack has been a vocal advocate for increasing diversity in the field of chemistry. He has actively supported initiatives aimed at attracting more women and minorities to the discipline and has worked to create an inclusive and welcoming environment for all students and researchers. In addition, Mack has been involved with articles that place a focus on supporting chemists of marginalized communities.

International Recognition: James Mack's contributions to mechanochemistry have earned him international recognition. He was the only American chemist to present research at the International Symposium on Mechanochemistry in China, highlighting the global significance of his work

== Research and achievements ==
Some of his notable achievements and contributions include:

The first solvent-free method for the reduction of esters:

- Publication: Mack, J.; Fulmer, D.; Stofel, S.; Santos, N. "The first solvent-free method for the reduction of esters." Green Chem (2007), 1041-1043.

The development of corannulene-based blue emitters:

- Publication: Mack, J.; Vogel, P.; Jones, D.; Kaval, N.; Sutton, A. "The development of corannulene-based blue emitters." Org. Biomol. Chem. (2007), 5, 2448-2452.

Rate Enhancement of the Morita-Baylis-Hillman Reaction through Mechanochemistry

- Publication: "Rate Enhancement of the Morita-Baylis-Hillman Reaction through Mechanochemistry." Green Chem. (2007), 9, 328-330.

Investigation of Corannulene for Molecular Hydrogen Storage via Computational Chemistry and Experimentation

- Publication: Scanlon, L. G., Balbuena, P. B., Zhang, Y., Sandi, G., Back, C. K., Feld, W. A., Mack, J., Rottmayer, M. A., Riepenhoff, J. L. "Investigation of Corannulene for Molecular Hydrogen Storage via Computational Chemistry and Experimentation." J. Chem. Phys. B (2006), 110, 7688-7694.

Appearance energies of singly, doubly, and triply charged coronene and corannulene ions produced by electron impact:

- Publication: Denifl, S., Sonnweber, B., Mack, J., Scott, L. T., Scheier, P., Becker, K., Maerk, T. D. "Appearance energies of singly, doubly, and triply charged coronene and corannulene ions produced by electron impact." Int. J. Mass. Spec. (2006), 249/250, 353-358.

X-ray Quality Geometries of Geodesic Polyarenes from Theoretical Calculations

- Publication: Petrukhina, M. A., Andreini, K. W., Mack, J., Scott, L. T. "X-ray Quality Geometries of Geodesic Polyarenes from Theoretical Calculations: What Levels of Theory Are Reliable?". J. Org. Chem. (2005), 70, 5713-5716.

Interstellar Chemistry: A Strategy for Detecting Polycyclic Aromatic Hydrocarbons in Space:

- Publication: Lovas, F. J., McMahon, R. J., Grabow, J.-U., Schnell, M., Mack, J., Scott, L. T., Kuczkowski, R. L. "Interstellar Chemistry: A Strategy for Detecting Polycyclic Aromatic Hydrocarbons in Space." J. Am. Chem. Soc. (2005), 127, 4345-4349.

Molecular satellite dishes: attaching parabolic and planar arenes to heterofullerenes:

- Publication: Hauke, F., Atalick, S., Guldi, D. M., Mack, J., Scott, L. T., Hirsch, A. "Molecular satellite dishes: attaching parabolic and planar arenes to heterofullerenes." Chem. Commun. (2004), 766-767.

Fullerene-Acene Chemistry: Single-Crystal X-ray Structures for a [60]Fullerene-Pentacene Monoadduct and a cis-Bis[60]fullerene Adduct of 6,13 Diphenylpentacene:

- Publication: Miller, G. P.; Briggs, J.; Mack, J.; Lord, P. A.; Olmstead, M. M.; Balch, A. L. “Fullerene-Acene Chemistry: Single-Crystal X-ray Structures for a [60]Fullerene-Pentacene Monoadduct and a cis-Bis[60]fullerene Adduct of 6,13 Diphenylpentacene." Organic Letters (2003), 5, 4199-4202.

Transition-Metal Complexes of an Open Geodesic Polyarene:

- Publication: M.A. Petrukhina, K.W. Andreini, J. Mack, L.T. Scott. "Transition-Metal Complexes of an Open Geodesic Polyarene." Angew. Chem. Int. Ed. (2003), 42, 3375.

== Entrepreneurship and Innovation ==
In addition to his academic pursuits, James Mack has been actively involved in fostering innovation and entrepreneurship within the academic community. Some of his notable contributions in this regard include:

Research Funding: James Mack has been successful in securing research funding from various sources, including the National Science Foundation (NSF), the American Chemical Society, and the Ohio Department of Higher Education. This funding has enabled him to conduct research in the field of mechanochemistry and green chemistry.

Mechanochemistry for Solvent Waste Prevention: Mack’s research on the "Utilization of Mechanochemistry for Solvent Waste Prevention" suggests innovative approaches to reduce the use of solvents in chemical reactions, which can have environmental and economic benefits.

Solvent-Free Ball Milling: James Mack's research has focused on developing a better understanding of organic reactions under solvent-free ball milling conditions, focusing on an environmentally friendly approach as it eliminates the need for traditional solvents in chemical processes.

Sustainable Pharmaceutical Reactions: Mack has also been involved in projects related to sustainable pharmaceutical reactions in a continuous flow environment, emphasizing the importance of green and sustainable chemistry in drug development.

Development of Recyclable Catalysts: His research has also extended to the development of recyclable catalysts and reagents using mechanochemistry, which can have applications in reducing waste and improving the efficiency of chemical processes.

Technical Advisor of Cinthesis: Cinthesis, a contract research organization specializing in mechanochemistry, offering customized and distinctive solutions places a focus on creating renewable and environmentally friendly sources of energy through the use of mechanochemistry.

Speaking Engagements: James Mack is a speaker on topics related to innovation, entrepreneurship, and bridging gaps in the academic and professional landscape. He has shared his insights and expertise at various conferences and events, including:

- James Mack (June 2008) - Presentation on "Mechanochemistry: Past, Present, and Future" at a Professional Meeting. Level: Regional.
- James Mack (August 2008) - Presentation on "The Development of Corannulene-Based Materials" at a Professional Meeting. Level: National.
- James Mack (May 2009) - Presentation on "Shake It Up: Chemistry Through High-Speed Ball Milling" at a Professional Meeting. Level: Regional.
- James Mack (September 2009) - Presentation on "Shaken Not Stirred: Chemistry Via High-Speed Ball Milling" at Queen's University Belfast. Level: International.
- James Mack (March 2011) - Presentation on "Bringing Corannulene into the Light" at a Professional Meeting. Level: National.
- James Mack (2011) - Presentation on "Bizarro World" at Queen's University of Belfast. Level: International.
