= Brent Hardt =

American diplomat

D. Brent Hardt
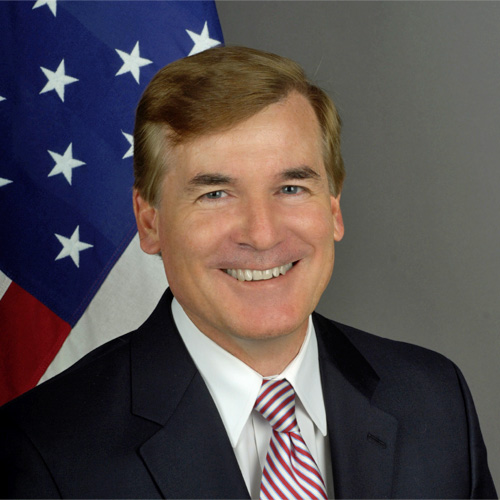

United States Ambassador to Guyana
- In office September 15, 2011 – July 6, 2014
- President: Barack Obama
- Preceded by: Thomas C. Pierce (Chargé d'Affaires a.i.)
- Succeeded by: Perry L. Holloway

United States Chargé d'affaires to The Bahamas ad interim
- In office April 10, 2007 – October 25, 2007
- President: George W. Bush
- Preceded by: John D. Rood
- Succeeded by: Ned L. Siegel

Personal details
- Born: David Brent Hardt; 1962 (age 63–64) Wisconsin
- Citizenship: United States
- Education: Tufts University, Fletcher School of Law and Diplomacy, MA, PhD Yale University, BA

D. Brent Hardt is an American career Senior Foreign Service Officer and present Consul General at the U.S. Consulate in Vancouver, B.C., Canada who served in the Western Hemisphere, Europe, and in Political-Military assignments. From 2011-2014 he served as U.S. Ambassador Extraordinary and Plenipotentiary to the Cooperative Republic of Guyana and Plenipotentiary Representative of the United States to the Caribbean Community (CARICOM). He most recently served as Chargé d'Affaires ad interim at the U.S. Embassy in Paris, France beginning in August 2017. Prior to his arrival in Paris, he served as Foreign Policy Advisor to the Commander of U.S. Central Command and as Foreign Policy Advisor to the Commander of U.S. Special Operations Command. Other assignments include service as Chargé d’Affaires at the U.S. Embassy to Barbados and the Eastern Caribbean from 2009-2011, and Deputy Chief of Mission and Chargé d’Affaires at U.S. Embassies in The Bahamas (2005-2008) and the Holy See in Rome (2002-2005).

== Career and biography ==
D. Brent Hardt joined the U.S. Foreign Service in 1988, serving in Berlin, The Hague, and the Caribbean. In the Netherlands he participated as an exchange diplomat within the Netherlands Ministries of Foreign Affairs and Defense. In Washington, he served as team leader for NATO Policy in the State Department's Office of European Political and Security Affairs, where he was responsible for issues of NATO enlargement, NATO-Russia, NATO-Ukraine and European Security and Defense Policy issues. He was confirmed by the Senate Foreign Relations Committee on June 11, 2011 and was sworn in as Ambassador to Guyana on August 19, 2011.

Hardt has received various Department of State awards, including Senior Performance Awards, the Director General's Award for Reporting, five Superior Honor Awards, and three Meritorious Honor Awards. He also received the Chairman of the Joint Chiefs of Staff Joint Meritorious Civilian Service Award and the U.S. Special Operations Command Distinguished Civilian Service Award.

Hardt earned a bachelor's degree in history from Yale University, and master's and doctorate degrees from the Fletcher School of Law and Diplomacy at Tufts University. He has published numerous articles on U.S. foreign policy, and has studied Italian, Dutch, German and French. He is married and has three sons.
