= Azruddin Mohamed =

Guyanese businessman and politician (born 1987)

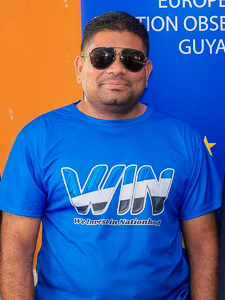

Leader of the Opposition
- Incumbent
- Assumed office 26 January 2026
- President: Irfaan Ali
- Preceded by: Aubrey Norton (2025)

Leader of We Invest in Nationhood
- Incumbent
- Assumed office 3 November 2025
- Preceded by: Office Established

Personal details
- Born: Azruddin Intiaz Mohamed; 1 March 1987 (age 39) Georgetown, Guyana
- Party: We Invest in Nationhood
- Relations: Nazar Mohamed (father)

Azruddin Intiaz Mohamed (born 1 March 1987) is a Guyanese businessman and politician. As the leader of We Invest in Nationhood (WIN), he has served as leader of the Opposition since January 2026.

== Early life and education ==
Mohamed is from an Indo-Guyanese Muslim family.

== Career ==
On 11 June 2024, the United States Department of State imposed sanctions on Mohamed and his father, Nazar Mohamed, for acts of public corruption and the avoidance of more than US$50 million in duty taxes on gold exports.

Mohamed launched his presidential campaign with We Invest in Nationhood in May 2025. In response, United States Ambassador Nicole Theriot warned that the U.S. would cut economic ties with a potential Mohamed administration, stating that the U.S. "would have to make sure that we didn't work with him specifically". Among his campaign promises was a pledge to donate his presidential salary to charity.

Mohamed was arrested by Guyanese police on 31 October 2025, following an extradition request by the U.S. on the basis of a federal grand jury indictment in Florida.

Mohamed was again arrested on 13 October 2026, along with two other men, after gunfire was exchanged outside the home of Senior Superintendent Prem Narine, a police witness in the extradition proceedings the U.S. began against Mohamed the year prior.

Since 2025, Mohamed has been the leader of We Invest in Nationhood, which was formed to contest the 2025 general election. The party achieved second place in the election, and in January 2026, Mohamed was elected leader of the Opposition.
