= James F. Mack =

American diplomat

James F. Mack (born 1941 in Norwalk, Connecticut) is an American diplomat who was Chargé d'affaires ad interim in Ecuador from January 1992 until November 1993 and Ambassador Extraordinary and Plenipotentiary to Guyana from September 1997 until April 2000. After he retired from the State Department the OAS, on September 15, 2004, named him Executive Secretary of the Inter-American Drug Abuse Control Commission (CICAD).

== Career ==
Born in Norwalk but raised in Rye, New York, he graduated with a major in government at Cornell University. Mack entered the Foreign Service in 1966 after having served in the Peace Corps in Honduras.

His diplomatic career began in Saigon, South Vietnam, where he was assigned as a political officer. In 1969, he returned to Washington, D.C., to work in the Bureau of Intelligence and Research as an analyst focused on South Vietnam. Subsequent overseas assignments included serving as Political and Labor Officer in San José, Costa Rica, as Labor Officer in São Paulo, Brazil, and later as Principal Officer at the U.S. Consulate in Ponta Delgada, in the Azores.

Over the course of his diplomatic career, Mack held a range of senior assignments both in Washington and abroad. At the State Department, he served as Desk Officer for Guatemala and Belize and later led the Office of Labor/Management Relations. His overseas postings included roles as Political Counselor at the U.S. Embassy in San Salvador, El Salvador, and Deputy Chief of Mission (DCM) in several U.S. embassies: Asunción, Paraguay; Quito, Ecuador—where he also served as Chargé d’Affaires for two years; and Lima, Peru, which was his most recent DCM posting before being named ambassador.
