= Robert Corbin (Guyanese politician) =

Guyanese politician (1948–2026)

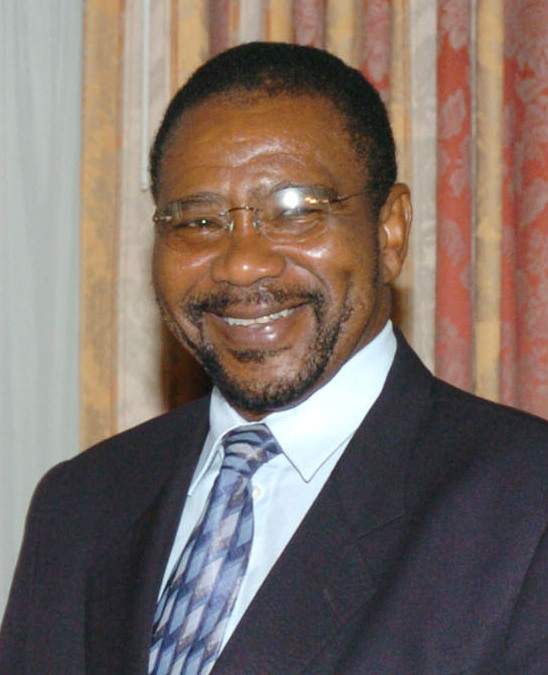
- Corbin in 2006

Leader of the Opposition of Guyana
- In office 23 December 2002 – July 2012
- Preceded by: Desmond Hoyte
- Succeeded by: David Arthur Granger

Personal details
- Born: Robert Herman Orlando Corbin; 15 February 1948 Linden, British Guiana
- Died: 4 October 2026 (aged 78)
- Party: People's National Congress

Robert Herman Orlando Corbin (15 February 1948 – 4 October 2026) was a Guyanese politician who was the Leader of the Opposition People's National Congress (PNC) between 2002 and 2012.

== Life and career ==
Robert Herman Orlando Corbin was born in Linden, British Guiana on 15 February 1948. He worked for the Youth Ministry of the Presbyterian Church before being educated in social work and law at the University of Guyana and the Hugh Wooding Law School. He worked as a social worker from 1966 to 1977 and during this time joined the PNC youth arm, the Young Socialist Movement before taking up a seat on the party's Central Executive Committee.

Corbin, who was first elected to the National Assembly of Guyana in 1973, became one of the leading lights in the PNC, serving the party as Senior Vice Chairman and General Secretary as well as holding a number of government ministries, including the office of Deputy Prime Minister from 1985 to 1992. Elected PNC chairman in 2000, in December 2002 he became party leader following the death of Desmond Hoyte. In February 2003, he was officially chosen to lead the PNC.

A disappointing defeat for the PNC in the 2006 legislative elections saw Corbin's leadership come under scrutiny, although ultimately his two prospective challengers withdrew before a contest could be organised and his leadership was affirmed. He was temporarily replaced as the chairman by Bishwaishwar Ramsaroop in 2010. In July 2012 Corbin was succeeded as party leader by David Arthur Granger. He was the only full-time party leader to have left his post without becoming president or prime minister.

He was married with five children, and continued to practise as an attorney-at-law until his death. He was also the younger brother of singer and actor Sol Raye.

Corbin died on 4 October 2026, at the age of 78.

Political offices
Preceded by Desmond Hoyte	Leader of the People's National Congress; 2003–2012	Succeeded by David Arthur Granger
