= Guyana–Mexico relations =

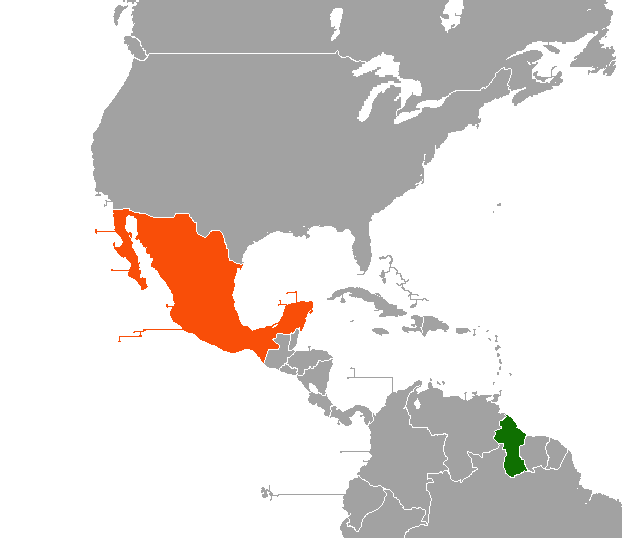

- Guyana: Mexico

The nations of Guyana and Mexico established diplomatic relations in 1973. Both nations are members of the Association of Caribbean States, Caribbean Community, Community of Latin American and Caribbean States, Organization of American States and the United Nations.

== History ==
Guyana and Mexico are two American nations with very different historical backgrounds. In May 1966, Guyana obtained independence from the United Kingdom and on 1 March 1973, Guyana and Mexico established diplomatic relations. Since then, diplomatic relations between both countries have been limited to only international cooperation through organizations such as the United Nations and regional multilateral organizations such as the Caribbean Community (CARICOM).

In 1975, Mexican President President Luis Echeverría paid an official visit to Guyana. In 1981, Guyanese President Forbes Burnham paid an official visit to Mexico to attend the North–South Summit hosted by Mexican President José López Portillo. Since the initial visits, there have been a few high-level visits between leaders of both nations.

Initially, Mexico was accredited to Guyana from its embassy in Port of Spain, Trinidad and Tobago. In 2007, Mexican Presidente Felipe Calderón paid a visit to Guyana. In 2009 Mexico opened its first resident embassy in Georgetown. Since the opening of the embassy, diplomatic relations have strengthened between both nations. In 2014, Mexican Foreign Minister José Antonio Meade paid a visit Guyana during his tour of Caribbean nations. In October 2015, Guyanese Prime Minister Moses Nagamootoo paid an official visit to Mexico.

In 2021, Guyanese President Irfaan Ali paid a visit to Mexico and met with President Andrés Manuel López Obrador. In 2023, both nations celebrated 50 years of diplomatic relations. To commemorate, the Guyanese Post Office released a special commemorative stamp.

== High-level visits ==
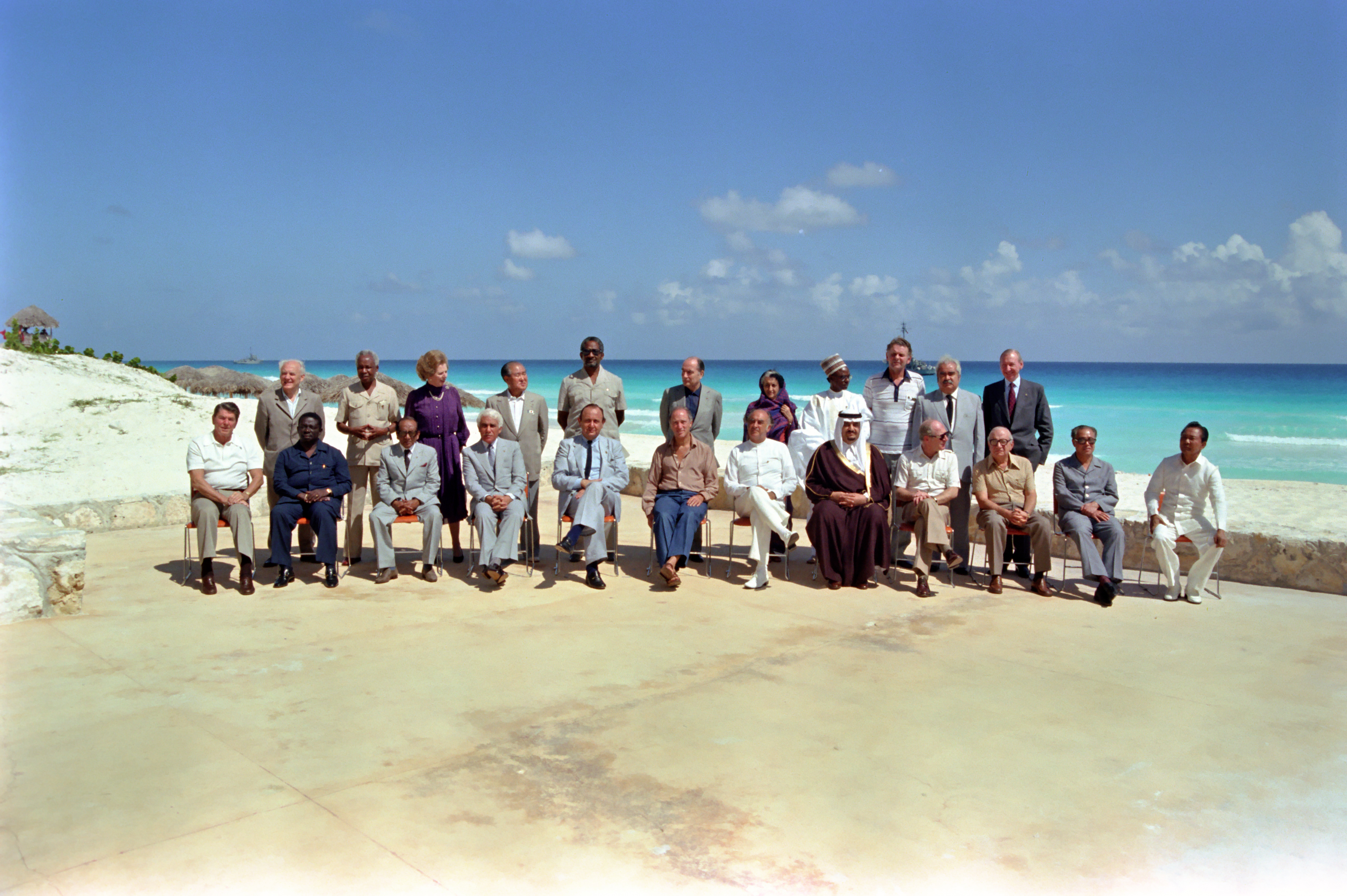
President Forbes Burnham attending the North–South Summit in Cancun; 1981.

High-level visits from Guyana to Mexico

- President Forbes Burnham (1981)
- President Bharrat Jagdeo (2011)
- President Donald Ramotar (2014)
- Prime Minister Moses Nagamootoo (2015)
- President Irfaan Ali (2021)

High-level visits from Mexico to Guyana

- President Luis Echeverría (1975)
- President Felipe Calderón (2007)
- Foreign Minister José Antonio Meade (2014)

== Bilateral agreements ==
In June 1996, Guyana and Mexico signed an Agreement of Scientific and Technical Cooperation.

== Trade relations ==
In 2023, total two-way trade between both nations amounted to US$141 million. Guyana's main exports to Mexico include: aluminum ores and concentrates. Mexico's main exports to Guyana include: tubes and pipes of iron, steel, household appliances, malt extract and food based products. Mexican multinational company Cemex operates in Guyana.

== Resident diplomatic missions ==
- Guyana is accredited to Mexico from its embassy in Washington, D.C., United States.
- Mexico has an embassy in Georgetown.
