= China–Guyana relations =

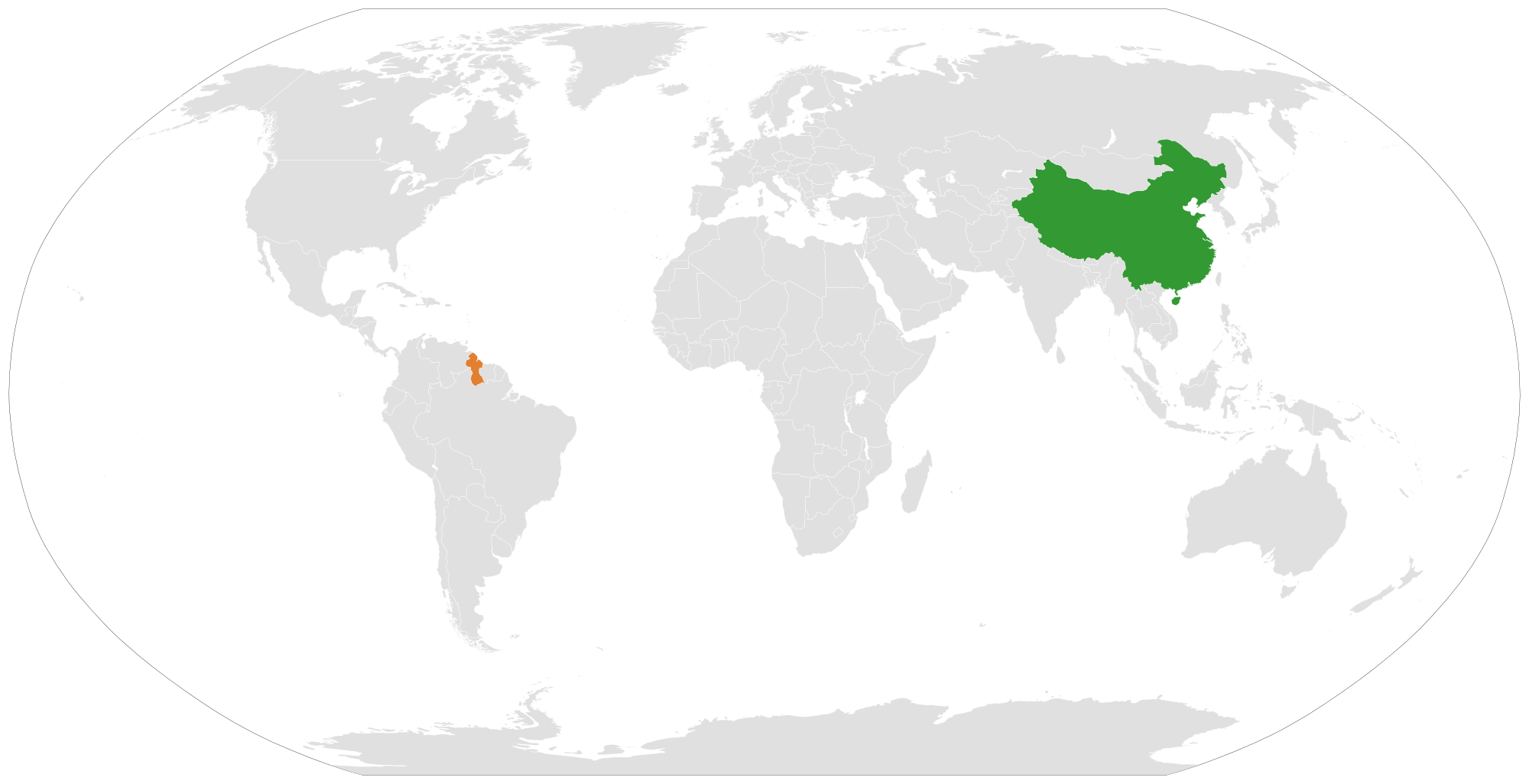

- China: Guyana

Diplomatic mission
- Guyanese Embassy, Beijing: Chinese Embassy, Georgetown

China–Guyana relations refers to the bilateral relations between the People's Republic of China and Guyana.

== History ==
=== Before the 20th century ===
In the second half of 1843, the British government ruling Guyana issued licenses to allow British Guiana and other places to import Chinese workers from other British Straits Settlements. In 1853, 154 Chinese arrived in Demerara, British Guiana by ship from Xiamen (69 died en route). These Chinese workers made a living on plantations in Guyana. Although their work was demanding and the working hours long, they were known for their ability to endure hardships and abide by the law. Due to their diligence, plantation owners in Guyana requested the government expand the scale of labor imports from China. However, most of the plantations in Guyana were located in swamps or tropical jungles. The weather was humid and hot, and mosquitoes were seriously infested, leading to prevalence of yellow fever and malaria. Many Chinese workers died of these diseases. The British colonial government centrally managed the importation of labour into Guyana; between 1853 and 1879, 13,281 Chinese labourers were assigned to work on 176 plantations in Guyana.

Before a large number of Indian farmers migrated to Guyana, rice cultivation in Guyana was mainly carried out by Chinese workers. Some Chinese scholars therefore believe that Chinese workers played an important role in the development of Guyana's material civilization. In addition, Chinese workers in Guyana also improved local rubber cultivation and sugar refining. Guyana ceased receiving new Chinese immigrant workers after 1879, and most of the previous Chinese workers did not return to their home country due to economic problems or personal wishes. The first President of Guyana after independence, Arthur Chung, was a descendant of local Chinese; he was also the first Chinese president outside of Asia.

=== After the 20th century ===
Guyana had contacts with the People's Republic of China before independence. The People's Republic of China supported Guyana's independence from Britain. Political parties advocating for Guyana's independence included the People's Progressive Party and the People's National Congress Party. The People's Progressive Party was considered more communist, while the People's National Congress Party had a cooler attitude towards the People's Republic of China when in power. Janet Rosenberg Jagan, then General Secretary of the People's Progressive Party, visited China in 1962 and was received by Mao Zedong and Zhou Enlai; in addition, some workers', youth, and women's groups in Guyana also visited China.

Guyana became an independent country in late May 1966. Forbes Burnham of the People's National Congress Party later became the country's Prime Minister. Zhou Enlai, then Premier of the People's Republic of China, sent a telegram to Burnham to congratulate Guyana on its independence; however, the Guyanese government invited the Republic of China, which had retreated to Taiwan, to send personnel to participate in the independence celebrations, and later accepted agricultural technicians from the Republic of China to provide local assistance. Chiang Kai-shek, then President of the Republic of China, sent diplomat Xue Yuqi to participate in the independence celebrations, and the head of the Republic of China's agricultural technical delegation to Guyana also visited the country in 1970 to learn about the country's rice production.In 1970, Guyana joined the Non-Aligned Movement. At that time, some member states of the Non-Aligned Movement were friendly to the People's Republic of China. Influenced by these countries, the Guyanese government sought to improve its relations with the People's Republic of China. In 1971, then Prime Minister of Guyana, Burnham, spoke at the Commonwealth Prime Ministers' Conference, stating that "the world widely recognizes Communist China, even at the expense of Taiwan". In the same year, he received a delegation sent by the People's Republic of China and stated that the Guyanese government recognized the government of the People's Republic of China as the legitimate and only government of China. In 1971, Guyana voted in favor of UN General Assembly Resolution 2758, supporting the People's Republic of China replacing the Republic of China's seat in the United Nations.

Subsequently, the People's Republic of China and Guyana reached an agreement to establish business offices in each other's countries. On June 27, 1972, Guyana formally established diplomatic relations with the People's Republic of China, becoming the first English-speaking country in the Caribbean to do so.

Burnham ruled for 21 years, followed by a change in government. The Republic of China sent personnel to lobby the new Guyanese government and promised substantial aid. Some officials of the new government became interested in this promised economic aid. Personnel from the People's Republic of China visited the new government's cabinet members and took the opportunity to explain the Taiwan issue in detail to senior officials. In April 1993, the Ambassador of the Republic of China to Grenada presented gifts to the Caribbean Community Secretariat in Guyana, and the People's Republic of China made representations to Guyana. The Minister of Foreign Affairs of Guyana personally met with personnel from the People's Republic of China and stated that the Ambassador of the Republic of China was invited by the Caribbean Community Secretariat. Guyana was not in a position to refuse to issue a visa, but the country's cabinet meeting had decided to prohibit senior government officials from communicating with the Ambassador of the Republic of China.

== Economic relations ==
Guyana joined the Belt and Road Initiative (BRI) in 2018.

In 2022, exports from Guyana to China totaled $1 billion. Chinese state-owned companies have constructed the largest bridge in Guyana, spanning the Demerara River. Upon opening it was named the Bharrat Jagdeo Demerara River Bridge. Wide commerce and trade between the two nations has grown significantly, rising from $180 million in 2013 to $1.4 billion in 2024.

Several Chinese companies operate in Guyana and established the Chinese Enterprises Association in 2014. In 2014, the cargo ship Yuanheng, built by a Chinese company in Guyana, was launched. This ship is the first medium-sized or large ship built in Guyana in decades and is planned for transporting timber.

== Cultural relations ==
The University of Guyana hosts a Confucius Institute, officially established in May 2014. The institute plans to send teachers to visit primary and secondary schools in Guyana to introduce China, Chinese language, and Chinese culture to local students. Additionally, the People's Republic of China has provided scholarships for Guyanese students to study in China.

== Assistance ==
After the People's Republic of China established diplomatic relations with Guyana, Guyana proposed achieving self-sufficiency in food, clothing, and housing, and asked China to assist in constructing textile factories and brick factories. Guyana's power transmission system is unstable, leading to frequent power outages. To address this, the People's Republic of China provided Guyana with preferential loans to finance the construction of cables, substations, and other facilities, with relevant projects starting in 2011.

The People's Republic of China has sent medical personnel to Guyana to provide medical services and volunteers to provide social services in various fields. Due to Guyana's poverty and underdeveloped medical industry, most employees of local Chinese-funded enterprises were unable to undergo regular physical examinations. In 2011, medical personnel sent by China to Guyana provided free comprehensive physical examination services to employees of local Chinese-funded enterprises, with over 20 employees participating. Chinese volunteers in Guyana provide veterinary, traditional Chinese medicine, and other services.
