= Nicole D. Theriot =

American diplomat

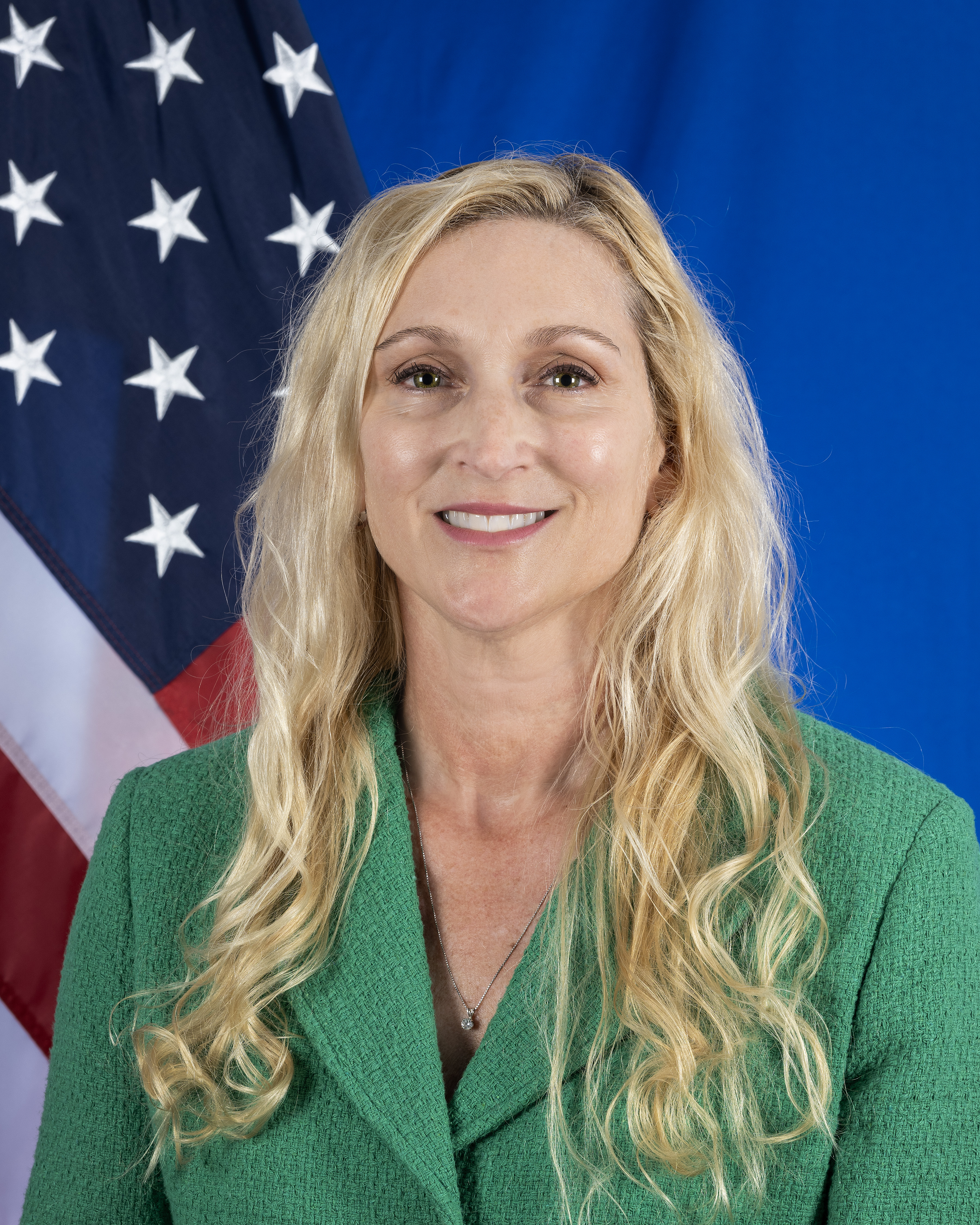

United States Ambassador to Guyana
- Incumbent
- Assumed office October 23, 2023
- President: Joe Biden; Donald Trump
- Preceded by: Sarah-Ann Lynch

Personal details
- Education: Louisiana State University (BA); Vanderbilt University (MA)

Nicole D. Theriot is an American diplomat who has been serving as the U.S. ambassador to Guyana since October 2023.

== Early life and education ==
Theriot holds a Bachelor of Arts degree from Louisiana State University and a Master of Arts in International Relations from Vanderbilt University.

== Career ==
Theriot is a career member of the Senior Foreign Service with the rank of minister-counselor. Currently, she serves as the U.S. ambassador to Guyana. Just prior, she was principal officer in Karachi, Pakistan. She has also served as deputy chief of mission at the U.S. Embassy in Port-au-Prince, Haiti. Theriot served as immigration and visa security director at the White House National Security Council. Before this, she served as a senior advisor to the deputy assistant secretary of state for overseas citizens services in the Bureau of Consular Affairs. Theriot also served as political counselor at the U.S. Embassy in Kabul, Afghanistan, along with principal officer in Casablanca, Morocco as well as the Bureau of Consular Affairs' supervisory regional consular officer in Frankfurt, Germany. Other overseas assignments include internal politics chief in Islamabad, Pakistan; consul general in Barbados and the Eastern Caribbean; deputy consular chief in Baghdad, Iraq; non-immigrant visa chief in Montreal, Canada; consular officer in Paris, France; and information officer in Lagos, Nigeria.

=== U.S. ambassador to Guyana ===
On September 7, 2022, President Joe Biden nominated Theriot to be the next ambassador to Guyana. On September 12, 2022, her nomination was sent to the Senate. Her nomination was not acted upon for the rest of the year and was returned to Biden on January 3, 2023.

President Biden renominated Theriot the next day. Hearings on her nomination were held before the Senate Foreign Relations Committee on March 30, 2023. The committee favorably reported her nomination on May 3, 2023. On July 27, 2023, her nomination was confirmed by the Senate by voice vote. Theriot presented her credentials to President Irfaan Ali on October 23, 2023.

Theriot responded to the announcement of the launch of Azruddin Mohamed's presidential campaign for the 2025 Guyana elections, warning that the US would cut economic ties with a potential Mohamed administration and that the US "would have to make sure that we didn't work with him specifically".

== Awards and recognitions ==
Theriot has won numerous State Department performance awards, including three Senior Foreign Service Performance awards.

== Personal life ==
A native of Baton Rouge, Louisiana, Theriot speaks French and Urdu.
