= South Sudanese Australians =

Australians of South Sudanese birth or descent

Total population
- By birth: 8,255 (2021 census); By ancestry: 14,273 (2021 census)–24,000 (estimate)

Regions with significant populations
- Victoria: 2,750 (by birth, 2016 census)
- Queensland: 1,430 (by birth, 2016 census)
- Western Australia: 1,201 (by birth, 2016 census)
- New South Wales: 977 (by birth, 2016 census)

Languages
- Nuer; Dinka; English; Arabic

Religion
- Christianity, irreligion

South Sudanese Australians are Australian citizens or permanent residents who are fully or partially of South Sudanese ancestry.

== Demographics ==
Following South Sudan's independence in July 2011, the Australian Bureau of Statistics (ABS) included the country amongst the country of birth and ancestry options in the 2011 census that took place in August. This census recorded 3,487 people born in South Sudan in Australia. However, the ABS notes that "South Sudan-born were previously included in the Census count of the Sudan-born, and this is highly likely with a large number in the 2011 Census". Of the 3,487, the largest number were living in the state of Victoria (1,118), followed by Queensland (715), then New South Wales (561) and Western Australia (489). A total of 4,825 people indicated that they were of partial or full South Sudanese ancestry.

The 2016 census recorded 7,699 South Sudan-born people in Australia, with 2,750 living in Victoria, 1,430 in Queensland and 1,201 in Western Australia. 10,755 people indicated that they had partial or full South Sudanese ancestry.

The 2021 census recorded 8,255 people born in South Sudan. 14,273 people indicated that they had South Sudanese ancestry.

=== Age and gender ===
The South Sudanese Australian population is slightly younger than the average for the total Australian population with a median age of 37 years compared to 38 years.

In the most recent census (2021), 4,062 male South Sudanese Australians were recorded and 4,193 females. This equates to a gender ratio of roughly 97 males per 100 females.

=== Education ===
According to the 2021 census, 19.3% of South Sudanese Australians over 15 years old had a “Bachelor Degree level and above” and 8.8% reported "no educational attainment" compared to 26.3% and 0.8% of the total Australian population.

=== Employment ===
For South Sudanese Australians aged 15 years and older, there was a labour force participation rate of 77.2% and an unemployment rate of 14.8%. This is lower than the total Australian population with a participation rate of 87.1% and 5.1% unemployment rate.

The most common occupations are "Community and Personal Service Workers" (33.2%), followed by "Labourers" (24.8%), "Machinery Operators and Drivers" (13.1%), and "Professionals" (10.5%).

=== Marital status ===
Among South Sudanese Australians aged 15 years and older, 39% are married, which is lower than the Australian average of 46.5%.

=== Median income ===
In 2021, the median household income for South Sudanese Australians was $1,547 AUD per week. This is lower than the total Australian population ($1,746 AUD) and over-seas born population ($1,936 AUD).

=== Religion ===
At the 2021 census, the major religious affiliations for South Sudan-born people were Catholic 36.8%, Anglican 29.4%, other Christianity 11.1%, and Presbyterian 3.9%. 4.9% reported no religion.

== Media perception and crime reporting ==
South Sudanese Australians suffer from racist attitudes on the part of some Australians, including members of the police force, politicians and the media, and on occasions this has led to violence and even murder. In 2007 Liep Gony, a 17-year-old Sudanese Australian, was killed in a random attack by two white men, one of whom had expressed the desire to kill a Sudanese man. Initial press reports claimed this murder to be related to Sudanese gang crime, and in the subsequent political storm, the Liberal National government more than halved the number of visas available to Sudanese people.

South Sudanese Australians were the object of an intense moral panic around supposed gang crime in Victoria in the period of 2016 to 2018, where the press and coalition politicians employed racialised criminalising language and exaggerated and distorted reporting of incidents involving, or allegedly involving, South Sudanese Australians. However, South Sudanese Australians are heavily overrepresented in crime statistics. in crime statistics in 2017–2018, accounting for 1.1% of unique alleged offenders while making up about 0.14% of the state population. Professor Wood of Melbourne University cautioned that this disparity should not be interpreted in isolation, as the South Sudanese-born population in Victoria was unusually young. Because offending is concentrated among younger age groups, especially those aged 18 to 25, the age profile of the community was described as an important factor helping to explain its overrepresentation.

== Notable South Sudanese Australians ==
- Aweng Ade-Chuol, fashion model
- Deng Adel, Basketballer
- Deng Adut, defence lawyer and New South Wales Australian of the Year for 2017
- Adut Akech, international fashion model (April 2018 Vogue Italia and May 2018 British Vogue cover model)
- Leek Aleer, Australian rules footballer
- Mac Andrew, Australian rules footballer
- DyspOra, Adelaide hip hop artist, poet, activist
- Aliir Aliir, Australian rules footballer
- Kenny Athiu, soccer player
- Bangs, hip hop artist
- Nagmeldin 'Peter' Bol, middle-distance runner and Olympian
- Elijah Buol, lawyer, criminologist and community advocate, 2019 winner of Queensland Local Hero of the Year 2019 Award and Order of Australia medal.
- Mabior Chol, Australian rules footballer
- Akec Makur Chuot, Australian rules footballer
- Majak Daw, Australian rules footballer
- Ajak Deng, Australian fashion model (April 2016 Vogue Italia cover model)
- Joseph Deng, middle-distance runner
- Majok Deng, basketballer
- Peter Deng, soccer player
- Thomas Deng, soccer player
- Martin Frederick, Australian rules footballer
- Michael Frederick, Australian rules footballer
- Gout Gout, South Sudanese Athlete 200M (Oceanian record holder in the 200 meters), Under 18 Record Holder for the 100M
- Changkuoth Jiath, Australian rules footballer
- Dor Jok, soccer player
- Tom Jok, Australian rules footballer
- Gordon Koang, blind popular musician
- Subah Koj, Australian fashion model, one of the first two South Sudanese-Australians to walk in the Victoria's Secret Fashion Show
- Alou Kuol, soccer player
- Garang Kuol, soccer player
- Jo Lual-Acuil Jr., basketballer
- Awer Mabil, soccer player
- Abraham Majok, soccer player
- Ater Majok, basketballer
- Thon Maker, basketballer
- Mangok Mathiang, basketballer
- Majak Mawith, soccer player
- Kot Monoah, Melbourne lawyer, from Oct 2015 chairman of the South Sudanese Community Association of Victoria, previously community liaison officer.
- Jackson Morgan, soccer player
- Adau Mornyang, international fashion model
- Bigoa Nyuon, Australian rules footballer
- Nyadol Nyuon, lawyer and human rights advocate
- Duop Reath, basketballer
- Duckie Thot, Australian fashion model, one of the first two South Sudanese-Australians to walk in the Victoria's Secret Fashion Show
- Ruon Tongyik, soccer player
- Reuben William, Australian rules footballer
- Kusini Yengi, soccer player
- Tete Yengi, soccer player
- Akiima Yong, Australian fashion model (April 2018 Vogue Australia cover model)
- Valentino Yuel, soccer player
- Friday Zico, South Sudanese international soccer player

== See also ==
- African Australians
- South Sudanese Americans
- South Sudanese Canadians
