= George Charles Bruno =

American lawyer and diplomat (born 1942)

United States Ambassador to Belize
- In office August 29, 1994 – November 25, 1997
- President: Bill Clinton
- Preceded by: Eugene L. Scassa
- Succeeded by: Carolyn Curiel

Personal details
- Born: August 20, 1942 (age 83)
- Party: Democratic
- Education: Hartwick College (BA); George Washington University (JD)
- Occupation: Diplomat, attorney

George Charles Bruno (born August 20, 1942) is an American attorney and diplomat, most recently practicing as an immigration lawyer in Manchester, New Hampshire. His diplomatic service included a posting as the U.S. Ambassador to Belize, from 1994 to 1997.

== Education ==
Bruno earned his Bachelor of Arts in Political Science from Hartwick College (1964), Juris Doctor from George Washington Law School, and a Fellowship at the University of Pennsylvania Law School.

== Career ==
Bruno argued and won a U.S. Supreme Court case, thereby preventing people's Social Security benefits from being taken by creditors, when he was just 29. (Philpott v. Essex County Welfare Bd., 409 U.S. 413 (1973) He managed the largest legal aid program in New Jersey, was the first Director of New Hampshire Legal Assistance, was the Assistant Director of the Executive Office of US Attorneys in the Department of Justice, and was elected twice as the Chairman of the NH Democratic Party.
