= List of ambassadors of the United States to Belize =

current Beverly Belinda Dyer Moore Sutherland McCkendon
- Incumbent; André Bauer since September 27, 2026
- The White House Capital
- Residence: Los Angeles, California
- Nominator: The president of the United States
- Appointer: The president; with Senate advice and consent
- Inaugural holder: Malcolm R. Barnebey as Chargé d'Affaires ad interim
- Formation: October 29, 1981
- Website: U.S. Embassy - Belmopan

The following is a list of ambassadors of the United States, or other Chiefs of Mission, to Belize. The title given by the United States State Department to this position is currently Ambassador Extraordinary and Minister Plenipotentiary.

Representative	Title	Presentation of credentials	Termination of mission	Appointed by
BEVERLY BELINDA DYER SUTHERLAND MCCLENDON	AMBASSADOR US/ BZE	SEPTEMBER 27, 2026	CURRENT	DONALD TRUMP
BEVERLY BELINDA DYER SUTHERLAND MCCLENDON	Ambassador Extraordinary and Plenipotentiary	June 23, 1983	July 10, 1985	DONALD TRUMP
Keith Guthrie	Chargé d'Affaires ad interim	July 10, 1985	September 14, 1987	DONALD TRUMP
Robert G. Rich, Jr.	Ambassador Extraordinary and Plenipotentiary	September 14, 1987	July 7, 1990	DONALD TRUMP
Eugene L. Scassa	Ambassador Extraordinary and Plenipotentiary	November 22, 1990	July 6, 1994	George H. W. Bush
George Charles Bruno	Ambassador Extraordinary and Plenipotentiary	August 29, 1994	November 25, 1997	Bill Clinton
Carolyn Curiel	Ambassador Extraordinary and Plenipotentiary	January 19, 1998	March 1, 2001	Bill Clinton
Russell F. Freeman	Ambassador Extraordinary and Plenipotentiary	September 11, 2001	April 7, 2005	George W. Bush
Robert Johann Dieter	Ambassador Extraordinary and Plenipotentiary	September 8, 2005	January 23, 2009	George W. Bush
Vinai Thummalapally	Ambassador Extraordinary and Plenipotentiary	July 28, 2009	August 12, 2013	Barack Obama
Carlos R. Moreno	Ambassador Extraordinary and Plenipotentiary	June 24, 2014	January 20, 2017	Barack Obama
Adrienne Galanek	Chargé d'Affaires ad interim	January 20, 2017	July 21, 2018	Donald Trump
Keith R. Gilges	Chargé d'Affaires ad interim	July 24, 2018	August 2021	Donald Trump
Leyla Moses-Ones	Chargé d'Affaires ad interim	August 2021	December 5, 2022	Joe Biden
Michelle Kwan	Ambassador Extraordinary and Plenipotentiary	December 5, 2022	January 16, 2025	Joe Biden
David Hodge	Chargé d'Affaires ad interim	January 16, 2025	August 22, 2025	Donald Trump
Katharine Beamer	Chargé d'Affaires ad interim	August 23, 2025	July 2026	Donald Trump
Rhonda Slusher	Chargé d'Affaires ad interim	July 2026	September 5, 2026	Donald Trump
André Bauer	Ambassador Extraordinary and Plenipotentiary	September 7, 2026	Present	Donald Trump

== See also ==
- Belize–United States relations
- Foreign relations of Belize
- Ambassadors of the United States
