= Russell F. Freeman =

American lawyer (born 1939)

Russell F. Freeman (born October 25, 1939) is an American diplomat and attorney. He served as United States Ambassador to Belize from 2001 to 2005.

== Early life ==
Freeman was born in Fargo, North Dakota on October 25, 1939. He graduated from Grinnell College in Grinnell, Iowa in 1961, and received a J.D. from Northwestern University School of Law in 1964. He served in the Judge Advocate General's Corps, United States Army for four years after attending The JAG School at the University of Virginia.

== Career ==
Freeman was a senior partner, director and president of the law firm Nilles, Hansen & Davies, Ltd., of Fargo, ND for thirty-two years. He was also an attorney for the North Dakota Supreme Court. From 2001 to 2005, he served as U.S. Ambassador to Belize.

Diplomatic posts
Preceded by Carolyn Curiel	United States Ambassador to Belize; 2001-2005	Succeeded by Robert J. Dieter
