= Sudanese Canadians =

Total population
- 17,490 (Canada 2021 Census)

Regions with significant populations
- Ontario: 8,975 Alberta: 7,070

Languages
- English; Sudanese Arabic

Religion
- Predominantly: Sunni Islam: Minority: Coptic Orthodox Christianity

Sudanese Canadians (Arabic: كنديون سودانيون) include Canadians of Sudanese ancestry and Sudanese immigrants to Canada. They include refugees from the Second Sudanese Civil War. The Canada 2021 Census recorded 17,490 people who reported their ethnicity as Sudanese.

== Notable Sudanese Canadians ==
- Elamin Abdelmahmoud, culture writer and commentator
- Marco Arop, middle-distance runner
- Lina Hamid, politician and member of the Nova Scotia House of Assembly
- Faris Hytiaa, comedian
- Mouraine, rapper
- Mustafa the Poet, poet and singer

== See also ==
- Black Canadians
- South Sudanese Canadians
- Sudanese Americans
- Sudanese Australians
- Sudanese in the United Kingdom
