= Melville Senior High School =

Location
- 18 Potts Street, Melville, Perth, Western Australia; Australia; 32°02′48″S 115°48′18″E

Information
- Former name: Melville High School
- Type: Public co-educational high school
- Motto: Resilient, Innovative, Successful
- Established: February 1960; 66 years ago (as Melville High School)
- Educational authority: WA Department of Education
- Principal: Samantha Steele
- Years: 7–12
- Secondary years taught: Year 7 to 12
- Enrolment: 1,415 (2024)
- Hours in school day: 8:40 am to 3 pm
- Campus type: Suburban
- Colours: Bottle green, gold and white
- Website: www.melville.wa.edu.au

Melville Senior High School is a public co-educational high school located in Melville, a suburb of Perth, Western Australia. Opened in 1960, as of 2024 the school had an enrolment of 1,451 students from Year 7 to Year 12, with its catchment area covering most of the City of Melville.

== History ==
The school was opened as Melville High School in February 1960, originally only with Years 8 and 9. Designed by architectural firm Parry, Parry and Rosenthal, and built by A. T. Brine and Sons Pty. Ltd., the school cost £324,493 to build, and was the first high school in Western Australia designed by a private architect.

The school's Parents and Citizens Association (P&C) was established in March 1960, with a Student Council being formed in 1964. The school's name was altered to the present Melville Senior High School in 1964. A fire on 21 April 1970 destroyed part of the Arts and Crafts section. A gymnasium and pool were completed in the 1970s. Another fire destroyed part of the Mathematics section in 1990.

A $450,000 upgrade of the school's administrative facilities was completed in 1997 as part of the Court government's schools program. A major redevelopment of the senior school, middle school and science quadrangles was completed in 2010.

In 2015, Melville made the adjustment to add year 7s (aged 12–13) into the cohort.

In 2017, a renovation to the school's student services facilities was completed.

== Catchment area ==
As defined by the School Education Act 1999, the catchment area for Melville Senior High School attempts to cover the entire suburbs of Attadale, Melville and Willagee, and parts of the suburbs of Alfred Cove, Myaree and Kardinya.

The school also shares areas of the suburbs of Bicton, East Fremantle, Fremantle and Palmyra with South Fremantle Senior High School and John Curtin College of the Arts; the suburb of North Fremantle with South Fremantle Senior High School, John Curtin College of the Arts and Shenton College; areas of the suburbs of Murdoch and Winthrop with Applecross Senior High School; and areas of the suburb of North Lake with Hamilton Senior High School.

== Programs ==
Melville operates specialist programs in the areas of netball, aviation, graphic design and media, and the government selected gifted and talented education. These programs are open to students outside of the catchment area.

The school also hosts an Intensive English Centre and international fee-paying student program, with 19% of students having a language background other than English. These programs are also open to students outside of the catchment area.

== Notable alumni ==
Notable people who have attended Melville Senior High School include:

- Peter Capes, businessman, former cricketer, CEO of the Subiaco Football Club
- Patrick Gorman, Labor Party politician, member for the division of Perth in the Australian House of Representatives since 2018
- Garry Kelly, Labor Party politician, member for the South Metropolitan Province in the Western Australian Legislative Council from 1982 to 1989
- Andrea Mitchell, Labor Party politician, member for the electoral district of Kingsley from 2008 to 2017
- Craig Parry, golfer.
- Sally Robbins, former Olympic rower.
- Diane Smith-Gander, business executive
- Friday Zico, soccer player

== See also ==
- List of schools in the Perth metropolitan area
