= South Sudanese Americans =

Americans of South Sudanese birth or descent

Total population
- more than 100,000

Regions with significant populations
- New York City, Boston, Philadelphia, Chicago, Milwaukee, Baltimore, Washington, D.C., Alexandria, Greensboro, Atlanta, Miami, Louisville, Kansas City, Minneapolis, Omaha, Tennessee, San Antonio, Dallas, Seattle, Denver, San Diego, Los Angeles

Languages
- (mainly) American English; Nuer; Dinka; Arabic; Zande (minority) Bari; Maban; Anuak; Shilluk; Moru; Madi; Acholi

Religion
- Christianity

South Sudanese Americans are Americans of South Sudanese ancestry, or South Sudanese people who have American citizenship. South Sudanese Americans can include American descendants to South Sudanese ancestors or South Sudanese immigrants who obtained an American citizenship.

According to former Ambassador Ezekiel Lol Gatkuoth (Head of Mission in Washington, D.C. for South Sudan), more than 100,000 southern Sudanese live in the US, (Note: As of 2024, the United States census does not have a separate category for 'South Sudanese' people, instead they are listed under 'Sudanese', 'African', or 'Other Subsaharan African'.) whose ancestors (or they) emigrated from their native country, mainly in the 1980s and 1990s. Many South Sudanese have moved to the US since the 1990s as war refugees, escaping civil war in Sudan and the refugee camps in Ethiopia and Kenya.

== History ==
The first people who migrated to the US from South Sudan arrived in the mid-1980s as a result of the civil wars in Sudan, settling in places such as Chicago.

This migration continued in the 90s, when some South Sudanese were established in other places such as Maine (settling eventually in cities such as Portland and Lewiston), Des Moines (Iowa), and Omaha, Nebraska (where in 1998 there were already established under 1200 people, who eventually would become the main population core of this group).

In 2000, the US Department of State decided to accept some South Sudanese into the US who were refugees of war. In 2001 a group of young South Sudanese refugees (mostly of the Nuer and Dinka ethnic groups) moved to the US. They were called the Lost Boys of Sudan, a group that was established that year. Approximately 3800 Lost Boys were allowed to resettle in the US in 2001. These youths mobilized the South Sudanese community of the cities, forming a South Sudanese association and increasing its visibility. They were brought as child war refugees from South Sudan to parts of the US, including Michigan, Chicago and Omaha, dispersed among 38 cities. So, since 2006, the largest population of South Sudanese refugees in the United States is in Omaha, which had then about 7,000 people. (it now has over 9,000)

== Demography ==
=== Places of origin and settlement ===
Since the early 1990s, more than 20,000 Sudanese refugees have been resettled in the United States, with about a fifth of that population constituting the "Lost Boys", i.e., young Nuer and Dinka refugees.

According to former Ambassador Ezekiel Lol Gatkuoth (Head of mission in Washington DC, for Southern Sudan), more than 100,000 South Sudanese live in the US. Amongst them are over 30,000 refugees who were settled in the US since the war broke out in 1983, living mainly in Omaha, Nebraska, where over 9,000 South Sudanese live.

Refugees from South Sudan come from the three geographical regions: the Bahr el Ghazal, the Upper Nile, and Equatoria (which includes Juba, the capital of the country). Upper Nile in general has the most refugees because that's where the war mostly was constituted in. (Dinka Bor and Nuer)

According to the 2000 census, the largest Sudanese communities (whether from North or South Sudan, as the 2000 US census did not divide the two groups because in that year the two countries formed one) were in New York City; Detroit; Des Moines, Iowa; Alexandria, Virginia; Los Angeles; and San Diego.

Sudanese Americans communities are also found in other cities such as Greensboro, North Carolina, Dallas, Texas; Flint, Michigan; and the Washington Metropolitan Area. According to the census, the states of Virginia, Washington, Maryland, California, Idaho, Minnesota and North Carolina have the largerst Sudanese populations in the US. Many Lost Boys of Sudan live in North Carolina.

South Sudanese communities are found in Omaha, Nebraska; Anchorage, Alaska; Detroit; Des Moines, Iowa; Alexandria, Virginia; San Diego (where about 1,000 South Sudaneses lived in 2011); Portland, Maine; Lewiston, Maine; Nashville, Tennessee; and Phoenix, Arizona. In Maine live 17 Sudanese tribes (with around 2,000 Sudanese and South Sudanese, between them, the South Sudanese Acholi tribe. There is also said to be more than 30 different tribes from Sudan in Maine.)

Since 1997, many South Sudanese people live in Omaha, Nebraska, a city that since 2006 has had the largest South Sudanese community in the US, since it has job opportunities, a low cost of living and an already established Sudanese community. Many Sudanese residents there have opened grocery stores which sell traditional Sudanese food.

The number of South Sudanese refugees who emigrate to Omaha has decreased due to the official end of the civil war in Sudan as of July 2012. South Sudanese continue to travel to Omaha, because of the South Sudanese community there, as well as for labor opportunities and affordable housing. Moreover, when the economy fell in Nebraska, many South Sudanese from there migrated to other places such as Anchorage, Alaska, where about 1,000 people of South Sudanese origin live. A South Sudanese school was created there that teaches the Nuer and Dinka languages, so that these South Sudanese languages do not get lost in the US.

=== Work and education ===
South Sudanese refugees moved to the US fleeing the religious and political persecution, warfare, and starvation which were produced by the Sudanese civil war. Many Sudanese or South Sudanese moved to America also for educational and vocational opportunities or for family reunification. Although many of them had thought about returning to Sudan eventually to fight for the political cause of South Sudan, many of them end up staying in the US permanently to send money to their families and to increase knowledge about the South Sudan situation.

The "Lost Boys" were dedicated to jobs such as accounting, engineering, carpentry and masonry, crop and animal husbandry, social and humanitarian work, and education, but many South Sudanese, despite having experience in those fields in Sudan, had to take jobs in the food service, retail, hospital, hotel, and airport security industries.

According to the Center for Immigration Studies, the Sudanese are relatively well-educated. One-third of them have a college degree and one-third have attended college. Thus, some South Sudanese achieved higher U.S. labor positions. Some institutes in places like Chicago train South Sudanese students for the clergy.

=== Culture ===
Most of the people of South Sudan in the United States are Christian, as are most people of the country. They are mostly Episcopalians, although some are Roman Catholic. Many South Sudanese tribes also live in the US. Most South Sudanese established in US belong to the Nuer, Dinka and Azande ethnic groups. Other South Sudanese ethnic groups resettled in US are the Anuak, Shilluk, Moru, Madi, and Acholi.

In Omaha live 10 Sudanese tribes (such as the Nuer, Dinka, Bari, Azande and Maban people), In Maine there are 17 tribes (with around 2,000 Sudanese in total, between them, the Acholi tribe).

Most of the Lost Boys of the South Sudan belonged to Dinka people; included, between others, in the United States, Nuer and Mora.

The South Sudanese created community networks and they celebrate May 16, a holiday that commemorates the day in 1983 when the separatists in South Sudan first organized anti-government north.

== Organizations ==
In 1997 was founded The Southern Sudanese Community Association (SSCA), a non-profit organization whose goal is provide an education at a basic level (case management, learning English, household budgeting, understanding currency and money, new cultural ways and social norms, transportation, and driver's education) for refugees in Omaha. Since its founding, the organization has helped more than 1,311 families originating from southern Sudan.

Later, after the Southern Sudanese Community Association and due to the difficulty of South Sudanese Americans to study in universities, a South Sudanese immigrant, Valentino, created the Valentino Achak Deng Foundation, which aims to help provide scholarships to aid the educational pursuits of South Sudanese Americans, support educational institutions and community organizations that work with South Sudanese immigrants. This foundation makes grants to American colleges and universities for scholarship funds to assist South Sudanese students enrolled in degree programs. Grants also are given to community organizations that assist South Sudanese refugees during the difficult adaptation period in the United States.

The South Sudanese also created the South Sudanese Community in Alexandria, Virginia, and the Southern Sudanese Community Center of San Diego. Because of the great difficulties faced by the Sudanese in the US, such as language and skill, a group of Sudanese from Rochester, Minnesota founded the New Sudan-American Hope in 1999 to help Sudanese refugees. This helps with various aspects of relocation. Almost a decade later and with members from diverse backgrounds, NSAH still helps refugees in Rochester and also is a source of education about the consequences of the war in Sudan.

== Notable people ==
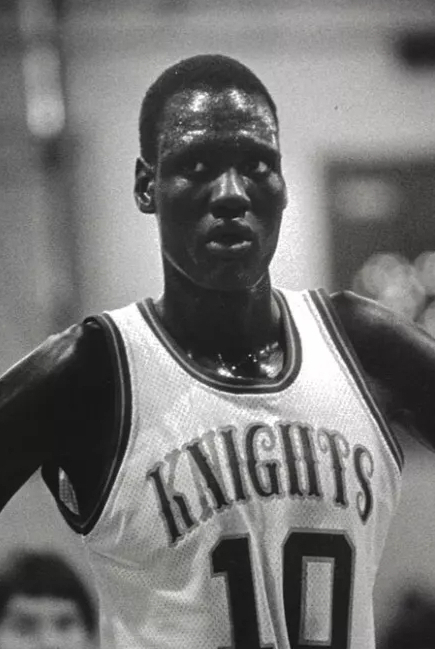
Manute Bol

- Francis Bok, abolitionist
- Bol Bol (born 1999), NBA basketball player
- Grace Bol, model
- Manute Bol, NBA basketball player
- Machop Chol (born 1998), MLS soccer player
- Abiol Lual Deng, political scientist
- Ataui Deng, model
- Ger Duany, actor and model
- Nyakim Gatwech, model
- Lopez Lomong, Olympic track and field athlete
- Guor Marial, Olympic track and field athlete
- Athing Mu, Olympic track and field athlete
- Nuni Omot (born 1994), basketball player in the Israeli Basketball Premier League
- Nykhor Paul, model
- Nyma Tang, beauty YouTuber
- JT Thor (born 2002), NBA basketball player
- Anok Yai, model

== See also ==
- South Sudanese Canadians
- South Sudanese Australians
