= Adongo =

Adongo is both a surname and a given name. Notable people with the name include:

- Ambrose Adeya Adongo (1947–2001), Kenyan trade unionist
- Daniel Adongo (born 1989), Kenyan rugby union player
- Adongo Agada Cham (1959–2011), Sudanese King
- Isaac Adongo (born 1972), Ghanaian politician
