= Cormac J. Carney =

American judge (born 1959)

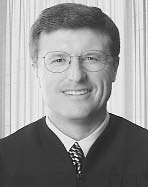

Senior Judge of the United States District Court for the Central District of California
- Incumbent
- Assumed office May 31, 2024

Chief Judge of the United States District Court for the Central District of California
- In office June 1, 2020 – June 26, 2020
- Preceded by: Virginia A. Phillips
- Succeeded by: Philip S. Gutierrez

Judge of the United States District Court for the Central District of California
- In office April 9, 2003 – May 31, 2024
- Appointed by: George W. Bush
- Preceded by: Carlos R. Moreno
- Succeeded by: Serena Murillo

Judge of the Superior Court of Orange County
- In office 2001–2003
- Appointed by: Gray Davis

Personal details
- Born: Cormac Joseph Carney; May 6, 1959 (age 67) Detroit, Michigan, U.S.
- Spouse: MaryBeth Carney
- Children: 3
- Education: University of California, Los Angeles (BA); Harvard University (JD)
- Football career

Profile
- Position: Wide receiver

Personal information
- Listed height: 5 ft 11 in (1.80 m)
- Listed weight: 200 lb (91 kg)

Career information
- High school: Long Beach (CA) St. Anthony
- College: UCLA

Career history
- 1984: Memphis Showboats (USFL)

Awards and highlights
- 2× First-team All-Pac-10 (1981, 1982); Second-team All-Pac-10 (1980)

Career statistics
- Receptions: 37
- Receiving yards: 701
- Receiving TDs: 2
- Kick return yards: 74

Cormac Joseph Carney (born May 6, 1959) is an inactive senior United States district judge of the United States District Court for the Central District of California.

== Early life and education ==
Carney was born in Detroit, Michigan to Irish immigrant parents, both of whom were medical doctors. His father was a County Mayo Gaelic football player, Pádraig Carney. The elder Carney immigrated to the United States to further his medical career. Cormac was raised in Long Beach, California, where he attended St. Anthony High School. Carney received a Bachelor of Arts degree from the University of California, Los Angeles (UCLA) in 1983 and a Juris Doctor from Harvard Law School in 1987. He attended the U.S. Air Force Academy for one year before transferring to UCLA.

== Football career ==
Carney was a wide receiver on the UCLA Bruins football team. He was named to the GTE/CoSIDA Academic All-America football team, and inducted into the CoSIDA Academic All-America Hall of Fame in 2005. He was also named to the 1981 and 1982 All-Pacific-10 Conference football teams.

A highlight of his college football career was UCLA's victory over Michigan in the 1983 Rose Bowl.

He played for the USFL team Memphis Showboats in the 1984 season. Carney made 37 receptions for 701 yards and 2 touchdowns.

== Legal career ==
Carney practiced law in Los Angeles for four years with Latham & Watkins and eleven years with O'Melveny & Myers.

== Judicial career ==
=== California state court ===
In October 2001, Carney was appointed by California Governor Gray Davis to the bench of the Orange County Superior Court. He served on the state bench, presiding over civil and criminal trials, until his appointment to the federal district court.

=== Federal judicial service ===
On January 7, 2003, Carney was nominated by President George W. Bush to a seat on the United States District Court for the Central District of California vacated by Carlos R. Moreno. A substantial majority of the American Bar Association's Standing Committee on the Federal Judiciary rated Carney as "qualified" for the post, while a minority of the committee members abstained. (ABA rankings of judicial nominees are on a three-part scale: well-qualified, qualified, and not qualified.) Carney was confirmed by the United States Senate on April 7, 2003, on an 80–0 vote, and received his commission on April 9, 2003. He assumed senior status on May 31, 2024.

==== Notable decisions ====
- In 2009, Carney dismissed fraud and conspiracy charges against two executives of Broadcom Corporation, a telecommunications company, because of prosecutorial misconduct. Carney also vacated a guilty plea by Broadcom co-founder Henry Samueli and dismissed a civil case brought by the Securities and Exchange Commission against four Broadcom executives. Carney found that the government had violated the defendants' right to a fair trial and right to due process by, among other things, engaging in conduct that "intimidated and improperly influenced" three important defense witnesses to try to prevent them from testifying and by leaking confidential grand jury proceedings.
- In Jones v. Davis (2014), Carney issued an opinion and order declaring the California death penalty to be unconstitutional, writing that the system's arbitrariness and lengthy delays led to only a "random few" being executed by the state and violated the Eighth Amendment's ban on cruel and unusual punishment. (California at the time had 740 prisoners sentenced to die, but had executed only 13 people since 1978, the last one in 2006.) In a 29-page order, Carney vacated the death sentence of Ernest Dewayne Jones, who was sentenced to death in 1995 for rape and murder. The order was appealed by then-California Attorney General Kamala Harris. The U.S. Court of Appeals for the Ninth Circuit overturned Carney's ruling in November 2015; in a unanimous decision of three-judge panel, the appellate court noted that "Many agree with Petitioner that California's capital punishment system is dysfunctional and that the delay between sentencing and execution in California is extraordinary," but held that the district court could not consider "novel constitutional theories" in reviewing a habeas corpus case.
- In Fazaga v. FBI (2012), Carney dismissed most of plaintiffs' claims on the grounds of the state secrets privilege. In 2019, the Ninth Circuit affirmed in part and reversed in part, reviving some of plaintiffs' claims. The Supreme Court ruled unanimously on March 4, 2022, reversing the Ninth Circuit and remanding the case. The opinion, written by Justice Samuel Alito, stated that Section 1806(f) of FISA does not override the state secrets privilege, as was ruled by the Ninth Circuit.
- In United States v. Rundo (2019), Carney dismissed criminal conspiracy charges and rioting against Robert Rundo, the leader of the white supremacist Rise Above Movement group, and three of this followers, stemming from their attack on counter-demonstrators and a police officer in Berkeley, California, in July 2017. Carney ruled that the Anti-Riot Act of 1968 was facially overbroad in violation of the First Amendment. In 2021, the Ninth Circuit reversed Carney's ruling. Applying the Brandenburg v. Ohio standard, the court of appeals, in a per curiam decision, agreed that the portions of the act that make it a crime to organize a riot, or to encourage, urge, or promote a future act of violence, were unconstitutional, but held that the Act's prohibitions on "speech that instigates (incites, participates in, or carries on) an imminent riot" and the Act's prohibition on "conduct such as committing acts of violence in furtherance of a riot, and aiding and abetting of that speech or conduct" were constitutional, since they addressed speech and actions directed to inciting or producing imminent lawless action and likely to incite or produce such action. Later, Carney dismissed the case again. This time, Carney said the two men were being selectively prosecuted, claiming that members of Antifa and other groups were not prosecuted for similar crimes. The controversial ruling was immediately put on hold by the Ninth Circuit Court of Appeals. The Ninth Circuit then reversed Carney a second time and reinstated the case on 18 July 2024, rejecting the defendants' arguments that they had been singled out for prosecution over "Antifa and far-left groups."
- In 2019, Carney sentenced Adau Mornyang, an Australian model, to three years of probation and 100 hours of community service for causing an airline flight disturbance; Mornyang had pleaded guilty to felony interference with a flight crew and misdemeanor assault.
- From March 2020 until May 2021, during the COVID-19 pandemic, the U.S. District Court for the Central District of California temporarily halted both jury trials and bench trials to prevent the spread of the coronavirus. Carney was one of a minority of judges who believed that trials should continue, believing that doing so was crucial for preserving the parties' rights. Beginning in September 2020, he sought to summon jury pools to select jurors for trial, but this effort was blocked by Chief Judge Philip S. Gutierrez. In five criminal cases, Carney dismissed federal charges with prejudice on speedy trial grounds. The controversial decision led to an appeal by federal prosecutors to the Ninth Circuit. In April 2021, the Ninth Circuit reversed Carney's dismissal of the indictment in United States v. Olson, holding that Carney had misread the "ends of justice provision" of the Speedy Trial Act and that Carney's view (that a speedy trial is required unless it is impossible to hold a trial) was "an unnecessarily inflexible interpretation of a provision meant to provide necessary flexibility to district courts to manage their criminal cases."
- On March 20, 2023, Carney in Boland v. Bonta issued a preliminary injunction against requiring handguns to have certain mechanical features (including microstamping) under the State of California's "Unsafe Handgun Act" (UHA). Throughout his ruling, Carney justified his decision by, amongst other considerations, pointing to logical contradictions he observed within the UHA, making an argument about the use of Off-Roster Handguns by law enforcement departments throughout the state by stating "If C.L.I.'s (Chamber Load Indicator[s]) and M.D.M.'s (Magazine Disconnect Mechanism[s]) truly increased the overall safety of a firearm, law enforcement surely would use them. But they do not. Instead, they choose to use 'newer, improved and safer generations of handguns' that are Off-Roster." In the conclusion of his ruling, Carney wrote "The Second Amendment enshrines a fundamental constitutional right for law-abiding citizens to keep and bear arms for self-defense." The Court's opinion effectively halts enforcement of the UHA after 14 consecutive days have passed from the date of the ruling.
- On December 20, 2023, Carney in May v. Bonta and Carralero v. Bonta (consolidated into one) issued a preliminary injunction against a major portion of "sensitive places" as defined in California's SB 2.

==== Tenure as chief judge ====
Carney succeeded Virginia A. Phillips as Chief Judge of the Central District of California on June 1, 2020. However, he stepped down on June 26, 2020 in light of allegations that he had made racially insensitive comments regarding the Clerk of the Court, Kiry Gray, who is African American. Carney referred to Gray as "street smart" and telling her "it was not like I was the police officer standing on your neck." Carney apologized to Gray for the remark. He was succeeded as chief judge by Philip S. Gutierrez.

== Personal life ==
Cormac Carney and wife MaryBeth have three children.

Legal offices
Preceded by Carlos R. Moreno	Judge of the United States District Court for the Central District of California; 2003–2024	Succeeded by Serena Murillo
Preceded by Virginia A. Phillips	Chief Judge of the United States District Court for the Central District of California; 2020	Succeeded by Philip S. Gutierrez
