= Belize–United States relations =

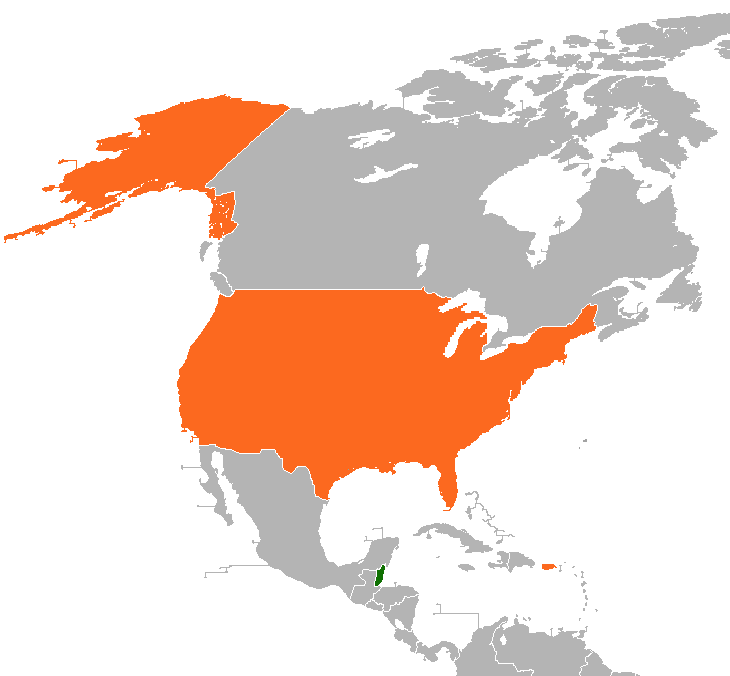

- Belize: United States

Diplomatic mission
- Embassy of Belize, Washington D.C.: Embassy of the United States, Belmopan

Envoy
- Ambassador of Belize to the United States Patrick Andrews: American Ambassador to Belize Katharine Beamer

Relations between Belize and the United States have traditionally been close and cordial. The United States is Belize's principal trading partner and major source of investment funds. It is also home to the largest Belizean community outside Belize, estimated to be 70,000 strong. Because Belize's economic growth and accompanying democratic political stability are important U.S. objectives, Belize benefits from the U.S. Caribbean Basin Initiative. Belize hasn't received a direct visit from an American president, the country's leadership has met with various American presidents during meetings along with the Caribbean Community such as the 1997 summit with Bill Clinton in Barbados.

== History ==
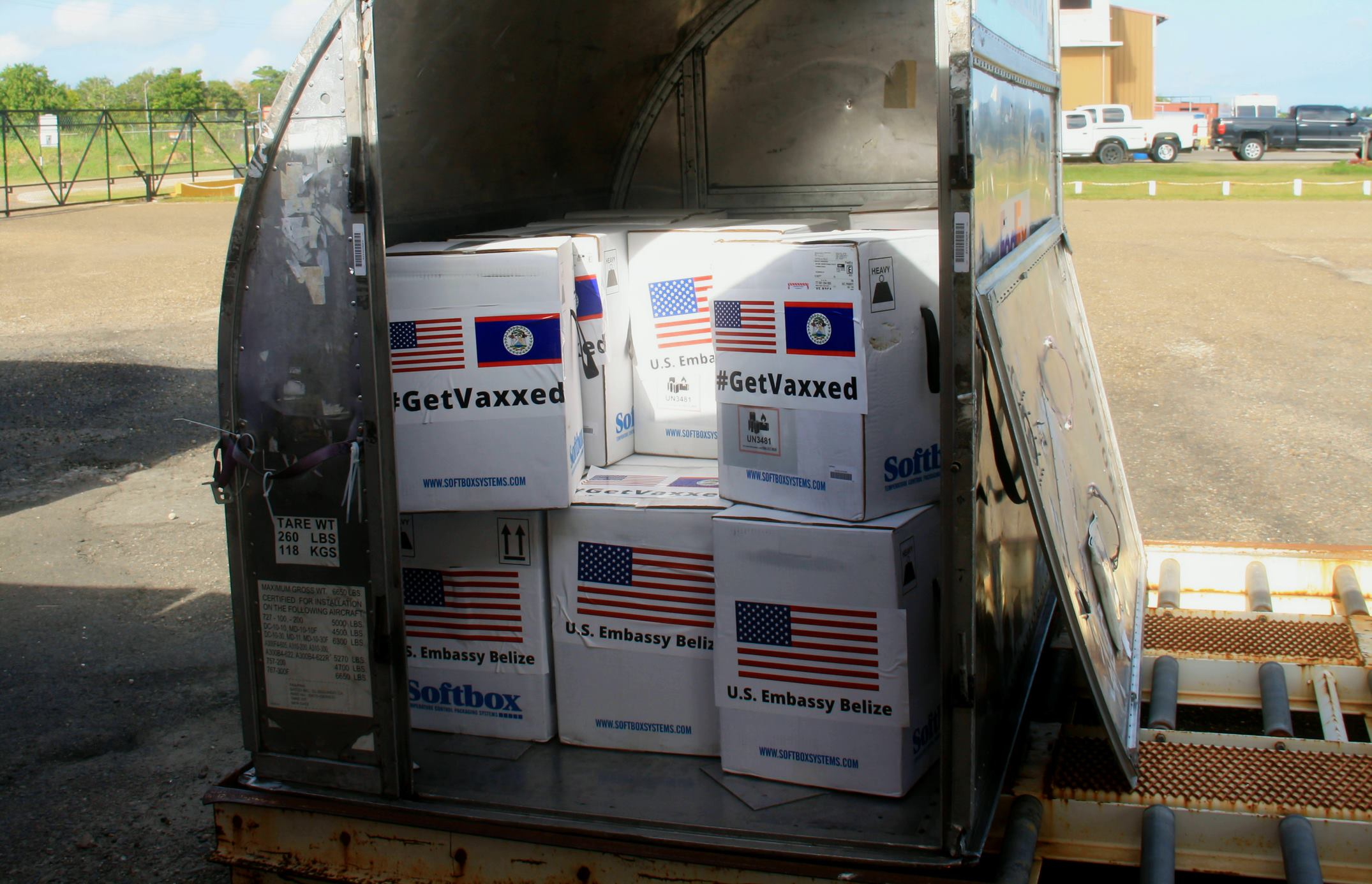
The US delivers Pfizer vaccines against the coronavirus as part of the COVAX program in 2021

The United States first established a consulate in British Honduras on 3 March 1847 when it was still a British colony.

In the 1960s, the U.S. sought to mediate a territorial dispute between Belize and Guatemala which stemmed from a treaty dating back to 1859.

Belize achieved full independence from the United Kingdom on September 21, 1981, following several months of negotiations involving the UK and Guatemala. The U.S. elevated the status of its diplomatic presence from a Consulate General to an Embassy on October 29, 1981, with Malcolm R. Barnebey serving as Chargé d'Affaires ad interim.

Initially located in Belize City, which had been battered by hurricanes in 1931 and 1961, and fires in 1999 and 2004, the embassy eventually moved to the new capital, Belmopan, on December 11, 2006.

== Areas of cooperation ==
International crime issues dominate the agenda of bilateral relations between the United States and Belize. The United States is working closely with the Government of Belize to fight illicit narcotics trafficking, and both governments seek to control the flow of illegal migrants to the United States through Belize. Belize and the United States brought into force a stolen vehicle treaty, an extradition treaty, and a Mutual Legal Assistance Treaty between 2001 and 2003.

The United States regularly participates in military training and exercises with the Belize Defense Force.

== Assistance ==
The United States is the largest provider of economic assistance to Belize, contributing $2.5 million in various bilateral economic and military aid. United States Agency for International Development (USAID) closed its Belize office in August 1996 after a 13-year program during which USAID provided $110 million worth of development assistance to Belize. Belize still benefits from USAID regional programs. In addition, Peace Corps volunteers have served in Belize since 1962. Until the end of 2002, Voice of America operated a medium-wave radio relay station in Punta Gorda that broadcast to the neighboring countries of Honduras, Guatemala, and El Salvador. The U.S. military has a diverse and growing assistance program in Belize that included the construction and renovation of several schools and youth hostels, medical assistance programs, and drug reduction programs. Private North American investors continue to play a key role in Belize's economy, particularly in the tourism sector.

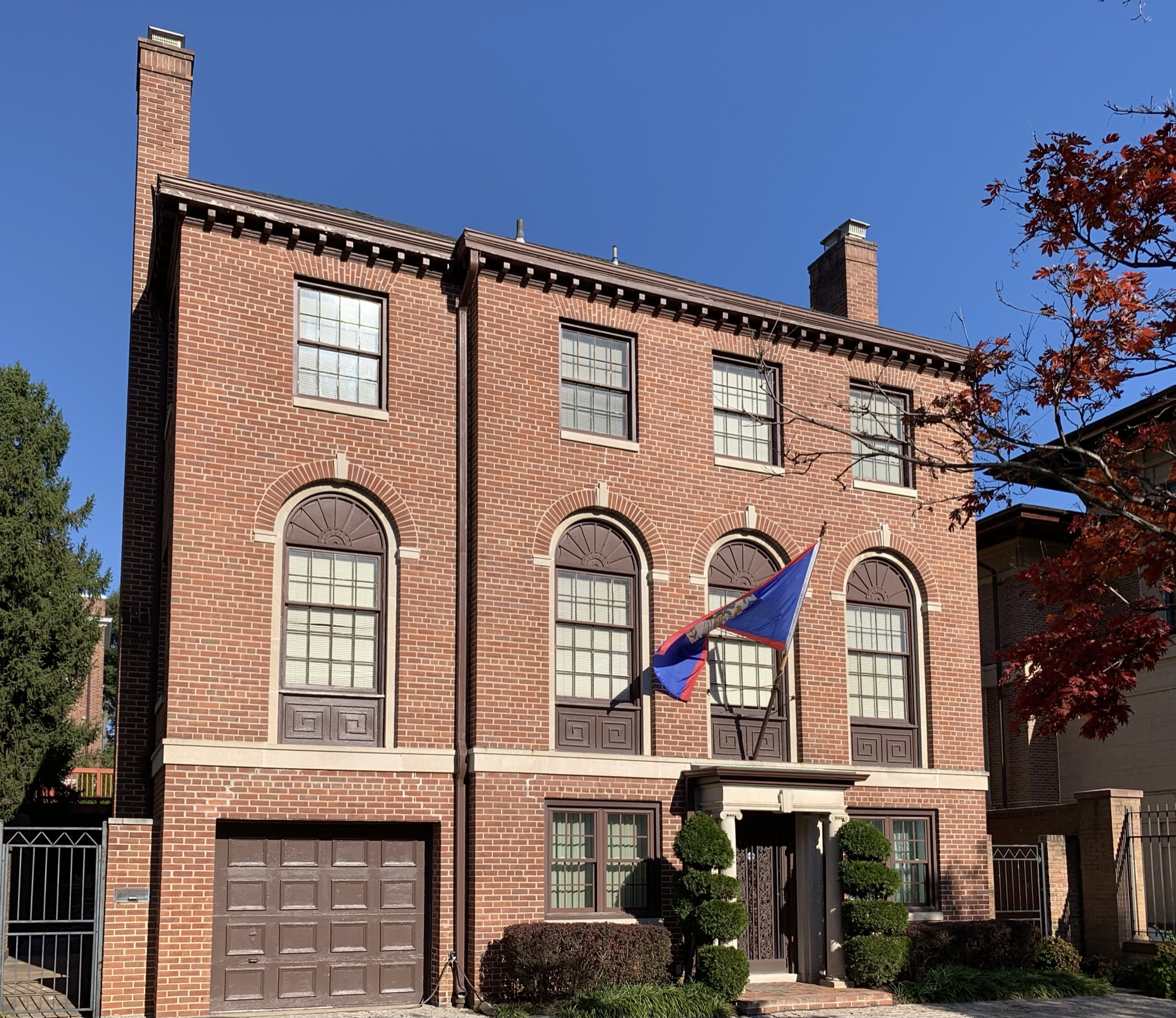
Embassy of Belize in Washington, D.C.

== Resident diplomatic missions ==
- Belize has an embassy in Washington, D.C., and a consulate-general in Los Angeles.
- United States has an embassy in Belmopan.

== See also ==
- Belizean Americans
- Foreign relations of Belize
- Foreign relations of the United States
- Confederate settlements in British Honduras
