= Arlo Maverick =

Canadian rapper and filmmaker

- Origin: Edmonton, Canada
- Genre: Hip-hop
- Years active: 2002-present

Marlon Wilson, known professionally as Arlo Maverick, is a Canadian hip-hop artist and filmmaker based in Edmonton, Alberta.

== Personal life ==
Maverick grew up in a working-class family in Edmonton and listened to hip-hop and reggae with his cousins. He first tried penning lyrics at the age of eight when he saw a girl in church who was writing a rhyme rather than listening to the sermon.

Maverick's partner is the painter and filmmaker Natalie Meyer. He works for National Oilwell Varco.

== Musical career ==
Wilson first adopted the name Arlo Maverick when he and his cousins Dirt Gritie and Bigga Nolte joined his friend DJ Sonny Grimezz to form the hip-hop group Politic Live in 2002. Politic Live toured across Canada and opened for acts like Busta Rhymes, Nas, and Snoop Dogg, but wound down in 2012.

Maverick released his first solo album, Maybe Tomorrow, in 2016. This loosely autobiographical concept album traces the story of a boy named Soup as he comes of age, starts a music career, and deals with life's struggles. It features contributions for many Edmonton-based producers, rappers, and singers. The album hit number-one on the Canadian Campus Radio Weekly Hip-Hop chart for four weeks.

In 2021, Maverick released the Focused EP, a collection of singles, followed by the EP Soul Merchant. This EP was inspired by reflections on humans' relationship with technology, prompted in part by Black Mirror, and was originally planned for release in 2018, but was delayed to rework the songs into something closer to Maverick's vision.

Maverick's next album, Blue Collar, appeared in 2023. The album explores his working-class background and challenges balancing work and life. It features a contribution from Maverick's Politic Live collaborator Dirt Gritie.

== Other pursuits ==
Maverick has been described as an important mentor figure within the Edmonton hip-hop community, helping to explain the steps in writing grants and producing and marketing an album. Among his mentees is Sudanese-Canadian rapper Mouraine. He has also long volunteered as a guest DJ for the community radio station CJSR-FM.

Maverick and his partner Natalie Meyer collaborated on the Telus Storyhive documentary series Allow Me to Introduce, whose episodes each discuss a song that left a mark on Edmonton's hip-hop scene. Wilson also received funding from Telus Storyhive to direct the documentary Unbreakable Crew, which documents the early history of breakdancing and hip-hop during the 80s in Edmonton. In 2025, Maverick and Meyer released the documentary Batting Beyond Borders about West Indian cricket players in Victoria Park, Edmonton.
