= Nyadol Nyuon =

Australian lawyer and human rights advocate

- Born: 1987 (age 38–39); Itang, Ethiopia
- Education: Victoria University (BA); University of Melbourne (JD)
- Occupations: Lawyer; activist

Nyadol Nyuon (born 1987) is an Australian lawyer and human rights advocate, who was born in a refugee camp in Ethiopia, of a family fleeing the Second Sudanese Civil War. She works as a commercial litigator in Melbourne and is a regular media commentator.

== Early life and education ==
Nyadol Nyuon was born in the Itang refugee camp in Ethiopia in 1987, where she lived until the age of four. The family was forced to leave the camp due to conflict in Ethiopia, taking 40 days to walk back to an area then in southern Sudan (since 2011, part of South Sudan). Not long after arrival, Nyuon was separated from her mother. She rarely saw her father, Commander William Nyuon Bany, one of the founders of the Sudan People's Liberation Army, as he was away fighting, and died in 1996.

She was raised by various step-mothers in Nairobi, Lodwar and at the Kakuma refugee camp in Kenya, where she did her primary and secondary schooling. It was also at Kakuma where she was inspired by the work of UNHCR lawyers and decided that she too wanted to be a lawyer. Her mother came and found her after her father's death and when she was about 14 years old, and brought her other siblings to Kakuma. Eight of them lived in a mud house.

In 2005 the family was accepted as migrants to Australia, and Nyuon was 18 years old when they arrived in Melbourne, penniless. After attaining her Victorian Certificate of Education, she earned a Bachelor of Arts at Victoria University before being accepted into Melbourne Law School at the University of Melbourne, where she was resident at Ormond College and graduated Juris Doctor. She was helped to achieve a scholarship by one of her professors, and was later given $10,000 by a woman she met by chance at a dinner, who was touched by her story. Her younger brother Bigoa became an Australian rules football player.

== Career ==
Nyuon has previously worked for prominent law firm Arnold Bloch Leibler.

In September 2020 Nyuon was appointed chair of Harmony Alliance: Migrant and Refugee Women for Change, a national coalition of migrant and refugee women in Australia. In her role as chair, she gave a speech to the National Press Club in Canberra, titled 'Australia Reimagined'.

In November 2021, Victoria University announced that Nyuon would take up a role in January 2022 as director of the Sir Zelman Cowen Centre, a legal education, training and research institute named in honour of former governor-general Zelman Cowen with a focus on law and cultural diversity. Nyuon oversaw the centre's delivery of the WorkWell Respect Network, a project initiated by WorkSafe Victoria aimed at protecting culturally diverse women in Victorian workplaces. The program was officially launched in July 2024. Nyuon resigned from Victoria University in 2025, after the project had been beset with problems, including delays, staff relationship tensions, and resourcing issues. An independent review subsequently found that "instability and mismanagement meant it could not properly assess the program's success". She later said that "sustained psychological and emotional assault" had led to mental health issues, and she had not felt supported by her employers. She had been concerned about being used as "corporate blackface".

=== Writing and media appearances ===
Nyuon has written for The Age, The Sydney Morning Herald, The Saturday Paper, The Guardian the Australasian Review of African Studies, Australian Mosaic (quarterly magazine published by the Federation of Ethnic Communities' Councils of Australia) and Offset (Victoria University’s annual literary magazine). She is a regular media commentator on programs such as ABC’s The Drum and Q + A, a volunteer and a keynote speaker.

In 2026, on the ABC National Forum, Nyuon said that she loves Australia, and celebrates being Australian. However, she argued that there is no single white Australian "Anglo Celtic" culture, just as there is no single Black culture, and Australia has never been "monocultural", even before colonisation. She said that she had "no intention of assimilating", as there is no single culture for her to assimilate into. She said that she had tried to show respect to the country and fit in, but that she had not felt welcomed, and had felt judged by others based on her colour. In addition, she had a poor experience at work (with WorkSafe Victoria) which had led to her being disillusioned, deciding to start the process of renouncing her Australian citizenship earlier in the year.

== Recognition and awards ==
- ? – Afro-Australian Student Organisation's "Unsung Hero Award"
- 2011 and 2014 – nominated as one of the hundred most influential African Australians
- 2016 – Future Justice Prize, an award "for an entrepreneurial person or organisation that has initiated and driven projects to advance future justice"
- 2018 – Australian Human Rights Commission’s "Racism. It Stops With Me" Award, for her efforts to combat racism in Australia
- 2018 – Harmony Alliance Award for her contribution to empowering migrant and refugee women
- 2018 – co-winner of the Tim McCoy Prize for her advocacy on behalf of the South Sudanese community in Australia
- 2019 – recognised as one of two Australian Financial Review Women of Influence, along with environmentalist Anna Rose
- 2021 – nominee for the 2022 Victoria Australian of the Year Awards.
- 2022 – Medal of the Order of Australia (OAM), Queen's Birthday Honours, for "service to human rights and refugee women"
  - In early 2026, Nyuon wrote to the Governor-General of Australia's office to begin returning the Medal, after becoming disillusioned with the country. The Governor-General accepted her resignation with effect from 22 May 2026.

== Activism and trolling incidents ==
Nyuon was drawn into fighting for the rights of African Australians after a number of racist incidents targeting her, her friends and others. She was trolled mercilessly after speaking out about Home Affairs Minister Peter Dutton's allegation in 2018 that Victorians were "scared to go out in restaurants" because of "African gang violence". She is determined to create a fairer Australia, pointing out the serious effects of racism on the victim's health.

After an appearance on Q+A on 15 June 2020, Nyuon was sent abusive messages on Facebook which were later found to have come from a serving police officer in South Australia Police. After this had come to light, the officer was put onto administrative duties and became the subject of an internal investigation. She said that she was regularly sent abusive messages after appearing on television, and would be taking some time off.

== Selected works ==
- "From the wreck of the pandemic we can salvage and resurrect an inner life". The Guardian. 8 August 2020. (An essay written during the COVID-19 pandemic in Australia, included in the anthology Fire, Flood and Plague, edited by Sophie Cunningham)
