= Serena Murillo =

American judge (born 1970)

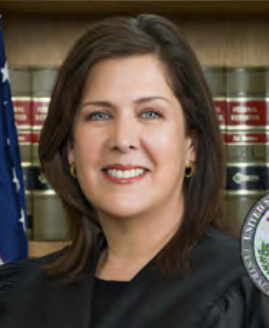

Judge of the United States District Court for the Central District of California
- Incumbent
- Assumed office January 9, 2025
- Appointed by: Joe Biden
- Preceded by: Cormac J. Carney

Judge of the Los Angeles County Superior Court
- In office January 5, 2015 – January 9, 2025
- Preceded by: Daniel Lopez
- Succeeded by: Terrence Jones

Personal details
- Born: Serena Raquel Murillo; 1970 (age 55–56) Pomona, California, U.S.
- Party: Democratic
- Education: University of California, San Diego (BA); Loyola Marymount University (JD)

Serena Raquel Murillo (born 1970) is an American lawyer who is serving as a United States district judge of the United States District Court for the Central District of California. She previously served as a judge of the Los Angeles County Superior Court.

== Early life and education ==
Murillo was born in Pomona, California. She is a graduate of Chino High School. Murillo received a Bachelor of Arts from the University of California, San Diego in 1993 and a Juris Doctor from Loyola Law School in 1996.

== Career ==
In 1996, she worked as a law clerk at Shernoff, Bidart, and Echeverria in Claremont, California and in 1997 she worked as an associate attorney at McNicholas & McNicholas in Los Angeles. From 1997 to 2014, she was a Deputy District Attorney in the Los Angeles County District Attorney’s Office. From 2015 to 2025, she served as a judge of the Los Angeles County Superior Court. From 2018 to 2019, she was an associate justice pro tem on the California Court of Appeal after being appointed by then Chief Justice Tani Cantil-Sakauye.

=== Federal judicial service ===
On October 23, 2024, President Joe Biden announced his intent to nominate Murillo to serve as a United States district judge of the United States District Court for the Central District of California. On November 18, 2024, her nomination was sent to the Senate. President Biden nominated Murillo to the seat vacated by Judge Cormac J. Carney, who assumed senior status on May 31, 2024. On November 20, 2024, a hearing on her nomination was held before the Senate Judiciary Committee. On December 12, 2024, her nomination was reported out of committee by an 11–10 party-line vote. On December 20, 2024, the United States Senate invoked cloture on her nomination by a 49–47 vote. Later that day, her nomination was confirmed by a 49–47 vote. She received her judicial commission on January 9, 2025.

== Personal life ==
Murillo's sister, Tiana, is also a judge on the Los Angeles County Superior Court, serving since 2022.

== See also ==
- List of Hispanic and Latino American jurists

Legal offices
| Preceded by Cormac J. Carney | Judge of the United States District Court for the Central District of California; 2025–present | Incumbent |
