= Robert J. Dieter =

American lawyer and diplomat

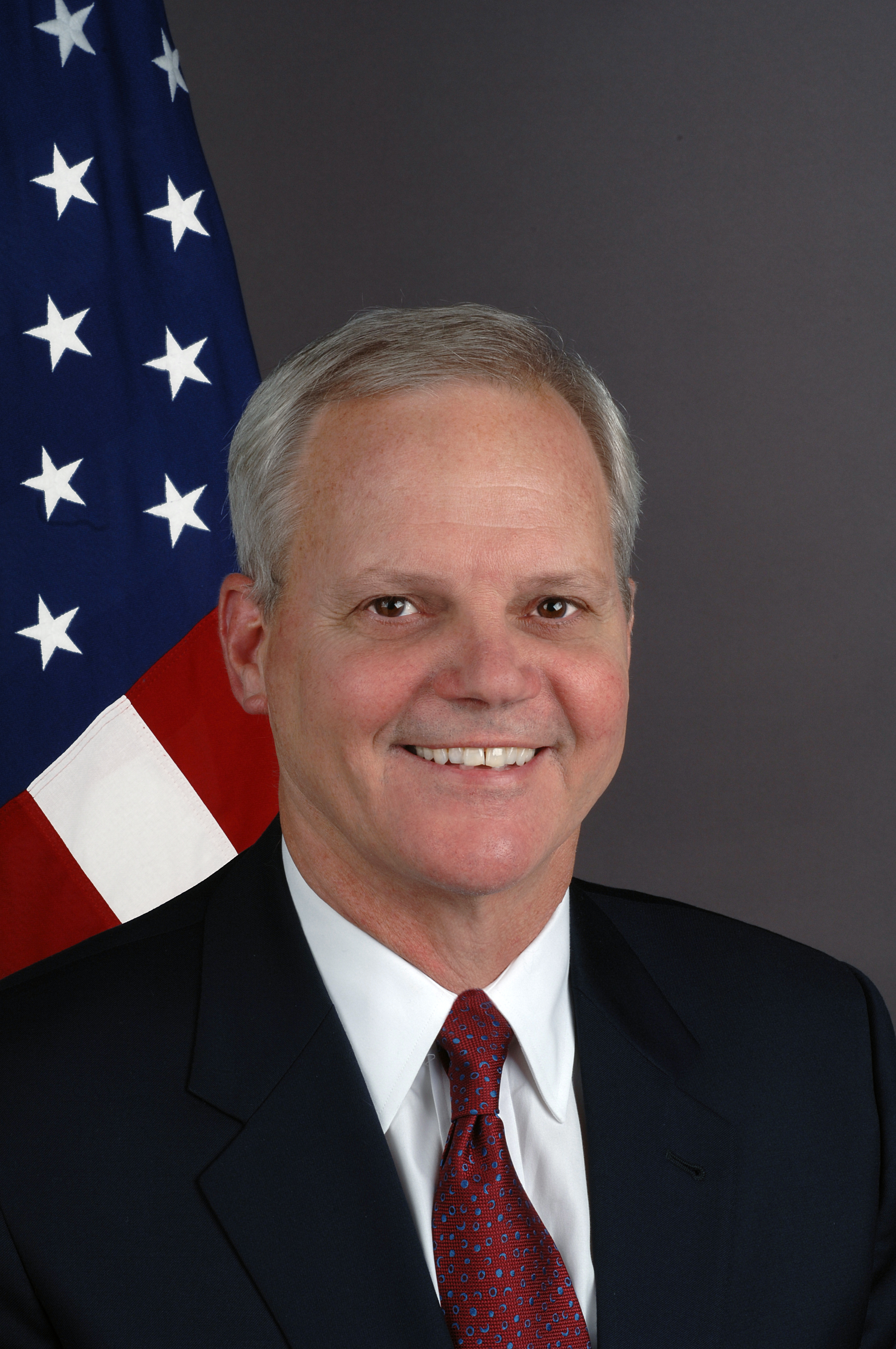

United States Ambassador to Belize
- In office July 25, 2005 – January 23, 2009
- President: George W. Bush; Barack Obama
- Preceded by: Russell F. Freeman
- Succeeded by: Vinai Thummalapally

Personal details
- Born: 1946 (age 79–80) New Orleans, Louisiana
- Party: Republican
- Spouse: Gwynneth A. E. Dieter
- Education: Yale University; University of Denver
- Profession: Lawyer

Robert J. Dieter (born 1946) is an American lawyer and diplomat who was the United States Ambassador to Belize from 2005 to 2009.

== Biography ==
Dieter graduated from the Phillips Academy and then attended Yale University as the roommate of future President George W. Bush. He graduated from Yale with a B.A. in 1968 and then continued his education at the Vanderbilt University Law School. Dieter earned his J.D. degree from the University of Denver Sturm College of Law in 1972. He taught at the University of Colorado Boulder.

In 2003, President Bush appointed Dieter to the board of the Legal Services Corporation. In 2005, he was sworn in as Ambassador to Belize.

On October 30, 1971, Dieter married Gwynneth Ann Fletcher Evans in St. James, Long Island, New York.

Diplomatic posts
Preceded by Russell F. Freeman	United States Ambassador to Belize; July 25, 2005 – January 23, 2009	Succeeded by Vinai Thummalapally
