= South Fremantle Senior High School =

Former school in Fremantle, Western Australia

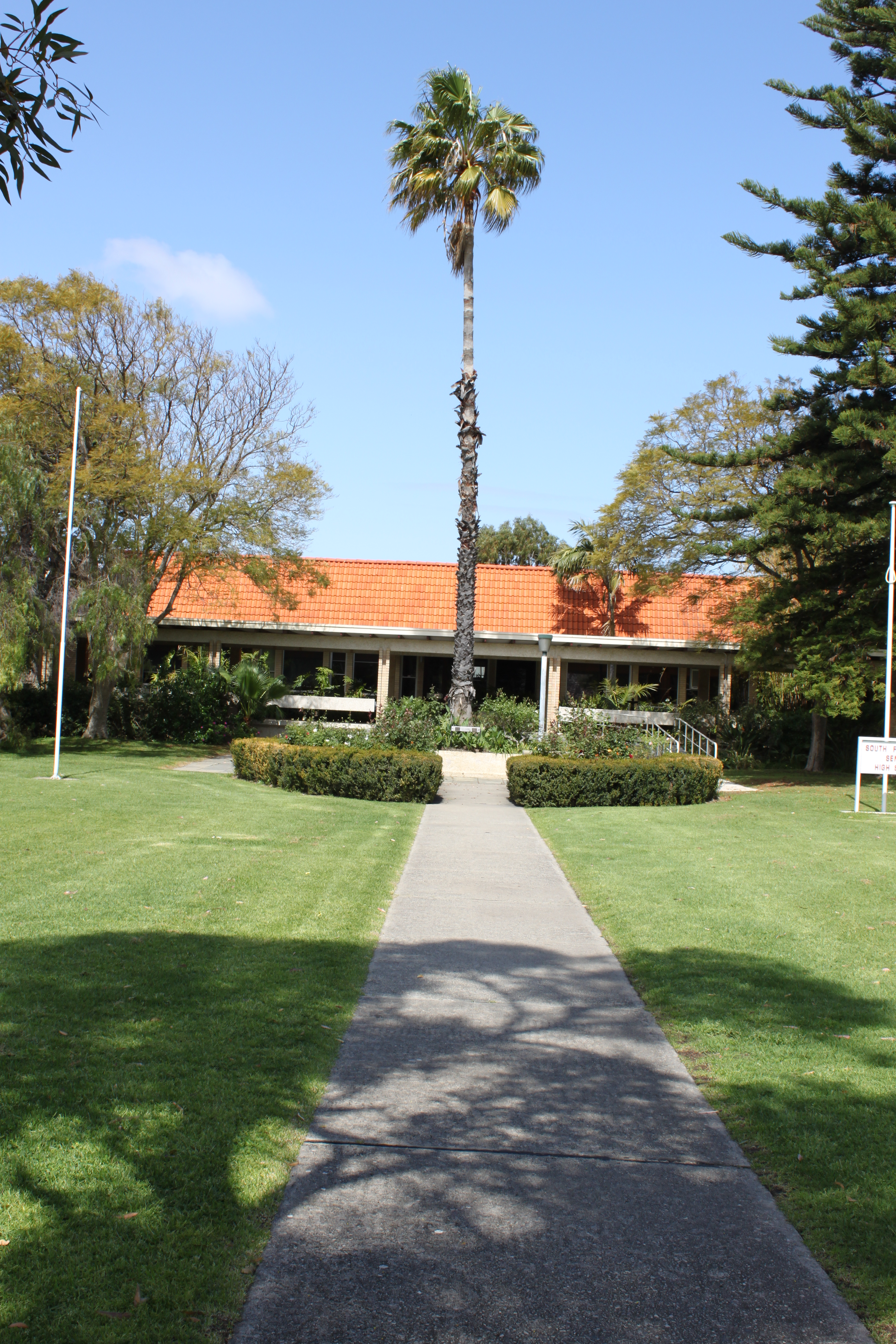
- The former South Fremantle Senior High School, in 2011, prior to its closure in 2017

Location
- Beaconsfield, Perth, Western Australia; Australia; 32°04′06″S 115°46′05″E

Information
- Type: Public co-educational high day school
- Motto: Character
- Established: 1967
- Status: Closed
- Closed: 2017
- Educational authority: WA Department of Education
- Enrolment: 324 (2013)
- Colours: Red, dark grey or white

South Fremantle Senior High School (SFSHS) is a former comprehensive public co-educational high day school, that was located in Beaconsfield, 3.5 kilometres (2.2 mi) south-east of Fremantle in the south-western suburbs of Perth, Western Australia.

The school operated from 1967 until its closure in 2017. Plans to close the school and merge students with Hamilton Senior High School to form Fremantle College were announced in December 2014. The larger number of students would allow for more opportunities and subjects for students. The school was closed permanently at the end of the 2017 school year. Prior to its closure, the school's catchment area covered most of the City of Fremantle and, as at Semester 2, 2013, the school had an enrolment of 324 students between Year 8 and Year 12, 28 (8.8%) of whom were Indigenous Australians.

== History ==
The school first opened in 1967. Its catchment area grew to include Winterfold Primary School in 1972, and remained basically unchanged for the rest of the school's life. In 2012, the school became the first officially accredited carbon neutral school in Australia, and in June that year won a World Environment Day Sustainability Leadership Award.

Enrolments at the school fluctuated over its last few years: from 443 in 2009, to 363 in 2010, 291 in 2011, 304 in 2012, and 324 in 2013.

== Special programs ==
The school offered specialist programs in baseball, marine studies and music studies. Entry to these programs was competitive and open to students beyond the catchment area. Students could be in all or none of these programs when attending SFSHS.

== Catchment area ==
South Fremantle's catchment area was specified by the WA Department of Education to include the suburbs of Beaconsfield, Hilton, O'Connor, South Fremantle and most of Fremantle. Students in East Fremantle had the choice SFSHS, John Curtin College of the Arts, or Melville Senior High School, whilst students in Samson and parts of Hamilton Hill and Kardinya were only able to attend Hamilton Senior High School. South Fremantle's feeder primary schools were Beaconsfield, East Fremantle, Fremantle, Hilton, Richmond, Samson, White Gum Valley and Winterfold.

Its neighbour high schools were John Curtin College of the Arts to the north-west, Melville Senior High School to the east, North Lake Senior Campus to the southeast and Hamilton Senior High School to the south.

== See also ==
- List of defunct public schools in the Perth, Western Australia
