= Vinai Thummalapally =

American diplomat

Vinai K. Thummalapally
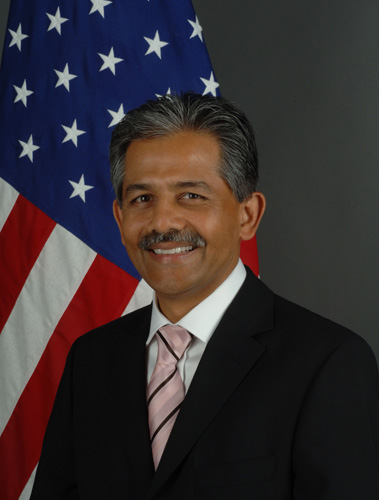

United States Ambassador to Belize
- In office July 28, 2009 – August 12, 2013
- President: Barack Obama
- Preceded by: Robert J. Dieter
- Succeeded by: Carlos R. Moreno

Personal details
- Born: 1954 (age 71–72)
- Education: California State University; University of Tennessee

Vinai K. Thummalapally (born 1954) was the U.S. Ambassador to Belize. He is the first Indian American ambassador in U.S. history.

== Early life ==
Thummalapally is the son of T. Dharma Reddy, a retired scientist who worked for Andhra Pradesh Forensic Sciences Laboratory, and T. Padmaja.

He came to America in 1974, and attended Occidental College in Los Angeles, where he spent a summer as Barack Obama's roommate.

Prior to his appointment as Ambassador Thummalapally was CEO of MAM-A Inc (formerly known as Mitsui Advanced Media). He has two patents in optical disc manufacturing design. Thummalapally has a B.S. degree from California State University and took graduate classes in business administration from both CSU and the University of Tennessee.

Diplomatic posts
Preceded by Robert J. Dieter	United States Ambassador to Belize; July 30, 2009 – August 12, 2013	Succeeded by Carlos R. Moreno
