= Carlos R. Moreno =

American judge (born 1948)

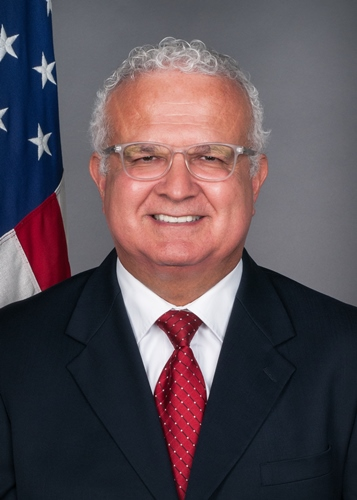
- Official portrait, 2013

United States Ambassador to Belize
- In office June 24, 2014 – January 20, 2017
- President: Barack Obama
- Preceded by: Vinai Thummalapally
- Succeeded by: Michelle Kwan (2022)

Associate Justice of the California Supreme Court
- In office October 18, 2001 – February 28, 2011
- Appointed by: Gray Davis
- Preceded by: Stanley Mosk
- Succeeded by: Goodwin Liu

Judge of the United States District Court for the Central District of California
- In office February 4, 1998 – October 18, 2001
- Appointed by: Bill Clinton
- Preceded by: Robert Mitsuhiro Takasugi
- Succeeded by: Cormac J. Carney

Personal details
- Born: Carlos Roberto Moreno; November 4, 1948 (age 77) Los Angeles, California, U.S.
- Party: Democratic
- Education: Yale University (BA); Stanford University (JD)

Carlos Roberto Moreno (born November 4, 1948) is an American jurist who is the former United States Ambassador to Belize, serving from June 24, 2014, to January 20, 2017. Previously, he served as a judge of the United States District Court for the Central District of California from February 4, 1998, to October 18, 2001, and as an associate justice of the Supreme Court of California from October 18, 2001, to February 28, 2011. Following his retirement from the bench, Moreno was counsel with Irell & Manella from 2011 to 2013. He has been a self-employed JAMS arbitrator since returning from Belize in 2017.

== Early life and education ==
Moreno is the son of Mexican immigrants, his mother arrived in the country with few skills and no resources after the death of his father at a young age. He grew up in a home where Spanish was the first language and where no family member had an education beyond high school. In a speech at the UC Davis School of Law (King Hall), he told students, "I never in my wildest dreams thought that I could become one of seven judges on the highest court in the state. I want to emphasize to you the idea that no matter what your dreams may be, you can follow them."

A native of Los Angeles, Moreno grew up in a small community in Elysian Park known as Solano Canyon. He attended local public schools (such as Solano Elementary) before going east to attend Yale University.

Moreno received his Bachelor of Arts degree in political science from Yale University in 1970 and his Juris Doctor from Stanford Law School in 1975. After graduating from law school and being admitted to the Bar in 1975, he served in the Los Angeles City Attorney's Office. As Deputy City Attorney, he prosecuted criminal and civil consumer protection cases, and handled politically sensitive and legislative matters for the City Attorney. In 1979, he joined the firm of Mori & Ota (which became part of Kelley Drye & Warren) representing the firm's business clients in its general commercial litigation practice.

== Judicial service ==
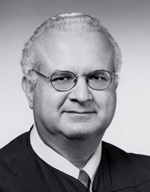
Carlos Moreno's official portrait as Associate Justice of the Supreme Court of California

=== State judicial service ===
Moreno's service in the judiciary began with his appointment in 1986 to the Los Angeles Municipal Court, Compton Judicial District, by Governor George Deukmejian. In that capacity, he adjudicated criminal matters, with an emphasis on serious felony offenses, and supervised the court's civil department until 1993, when Governor Pete Wilson elevated him to the Los Angeles County Superior Court, where he presided over felony trials.

=== Federal judicial service ===
Moreno was nominated by President Bill Clinton on July 31, 1997, to a seat on the United States District Court for the Central District of California vacated by Judge Robert Mitsuhiro Takasugi. He was confirmed by the Senate on February 3, 1998, and received commission on February 4, 1998. His service terminated on October 18, 2001, due to resignation.

=== California Supreme Court service ===
Moreno was appointed to the Supreme Court of California following his nomination by Governor Gray Davis. In November 2002, California voters confirmed Moreno for the remainder of the term of his deceased predecessor, Justice Stanley Mosk. In 2010, California voters confirmed Justice Moreno to a full 12-year term.

As an associate justice of the California Supreme Court, Moreno reviewed on appeal a wide range of civil and criminal cases, which have substantial state and federal constitutional implications. With his appointment to the Supreme Court of California, he became only the third judge of Hispanic heritage to serve in the Court's nearly 150-year history, and the first in more than a decade, since Cruz Reynoso.

=== Retirement ===
On January 6, 2011, Moreno announced his intention to retire from the California Supreme Court effective February 28, 2011. After leaving the court, Moreno was counsel with the Irell & Manella. In April 2017, he began working as a mediator and arbitrator in Los Angeles.

== Awards and honors ==
Moreno is the former president of the Mexican American Bar Association. He has been a member of the California Judges Association, the Presiding Judges Association and the Municipal Court Judges Association of Los Angeles County. He was also the president of the Yale Club of Southern California, and a member of the Stanford University Law School Board of Visitors. He currently serves as a director of the Arroyo Vista Family Health Center and the Western Justice Center Foundation.

Moreno was honored with the Criminal Justice Superior Court Judge of the Year Award in 1997, from the Los Angeles County Bar Association, and was presented with the "For God, For Country, and For Yale" Award in 2001, recognizing him as a distinguished alumnus of Yale University. He also received an honorary degree from Southwestern Law School in May 2002 for his devotion to the justice system, young people and the community. In 2009, he was awarded the Yale Medal, which "is the highest award presented by the Association of Yale Alumni and is conferred solely to recognize and honor outstanding individual service to the University."

== Possible nomination to the U.S. Supreme Court ==
On May 13, 2009, the Associated Press reported that President Barack Obama was considering Moreno, among others, for possible appointment to the United States Supreme Court. Despite the potential nomination, he released a controversial dissent in Strauss v. Horton the same day President Obama nominated Sonia Sotomayor.

== U.S. Ambassador to Belize ==
On July 8, 2013, President Obama announced his intent to nominate Moreno to be United States Ambassador to Belize. On July 9, 2013, Obama formally nominated Moreno to the post. On Wednesday, May 14, 2014, the United States Senate confirmed Moreno to his ambassadorship by voice vote. Moreno arrived in Belize on June 21, 2014 and presented his credentials to Governor General Sir Colville Young on June 24, 2014. He stepped down from the post at the end of Obama's term.

== See also ==
- Barack Obama Supreme Court candidates
- List of Hispanic and Latino American jurists
- List of justices of the Supreme Court of California

== Photos and video ==
- Photo of Carlos Moreno. San Diego Union-Tribune, March 4, 2008.
- Appearances on C-SPAN

Legal offices
Preceded by Robert Mitsuhiro Takasugi	Judge of the United States District Court for the Central District of California; 1997–2001	Succeeded by Cormac J. Carney
Preceded by Stanley Mosk	Associate Justice of the California Supreme Court; 2001–2011	Succeeded by Goodwin Liu
Diplomatic posts
Preceded by Vinai Thummalapally	United States Ambassador to Belize; 2014–2017	Succeeded by Adrienne Galanek; Chargé d'Affaires ad interim
