= Keith R. Gilges =

American diplomat

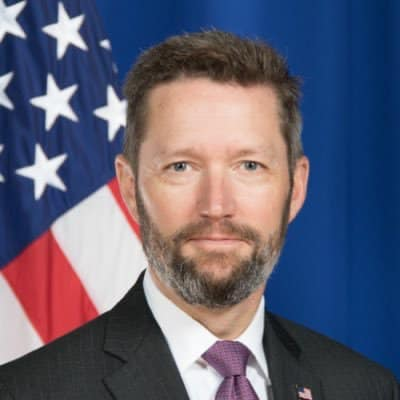

U.S. Chargé d'Affaires in Belize
- In office July 24, 2018 – August 2021
- President: Donald Trump; Joe Biden
- Preceded by: Adrienne Galanek
- Succeeded by: Leyla Moses-Ones

Keith R. Gilges became the U.S. chargé d’affaires ad interim in Belize on July 24, 2018, replacing Adrienne Galanek, after serving as the Director for North America overseeing interagency policy development involving Canada and Mexico for the National Security Council at the White House in 2017-2018. He has served as Director of the Office of Central African Affairs in the Bureau of African Affairs since July 2024.

He was deputy chief of mission at the U.S. Embassy in Burundi from June 2022 to May 2024, serving as chargé d'affaires from July 2023 to May 2024. He was also acting deputy chief of mission at the U.S. Embassy in Trinidad and Tobago in 2014-2015, where he had served as chief of the political section since August 2012. He also served at U.S. embassies in Kenya, Brazil, and Mozambique, and as chief of staff in the Bureau of Intelligence and Research at the Department of State.

Gilges earned a Master of Science in Environmental Management from the University of Hong Kong and a Bachelor of Arts from the College of William and Mary.

Diplomatic posts
Preceded by Adrienne Galanek	United States Chargé d'Affaires for Belize; 2018–2021	Succeeded by Leyla Moses Ones
