= Fremantle College =

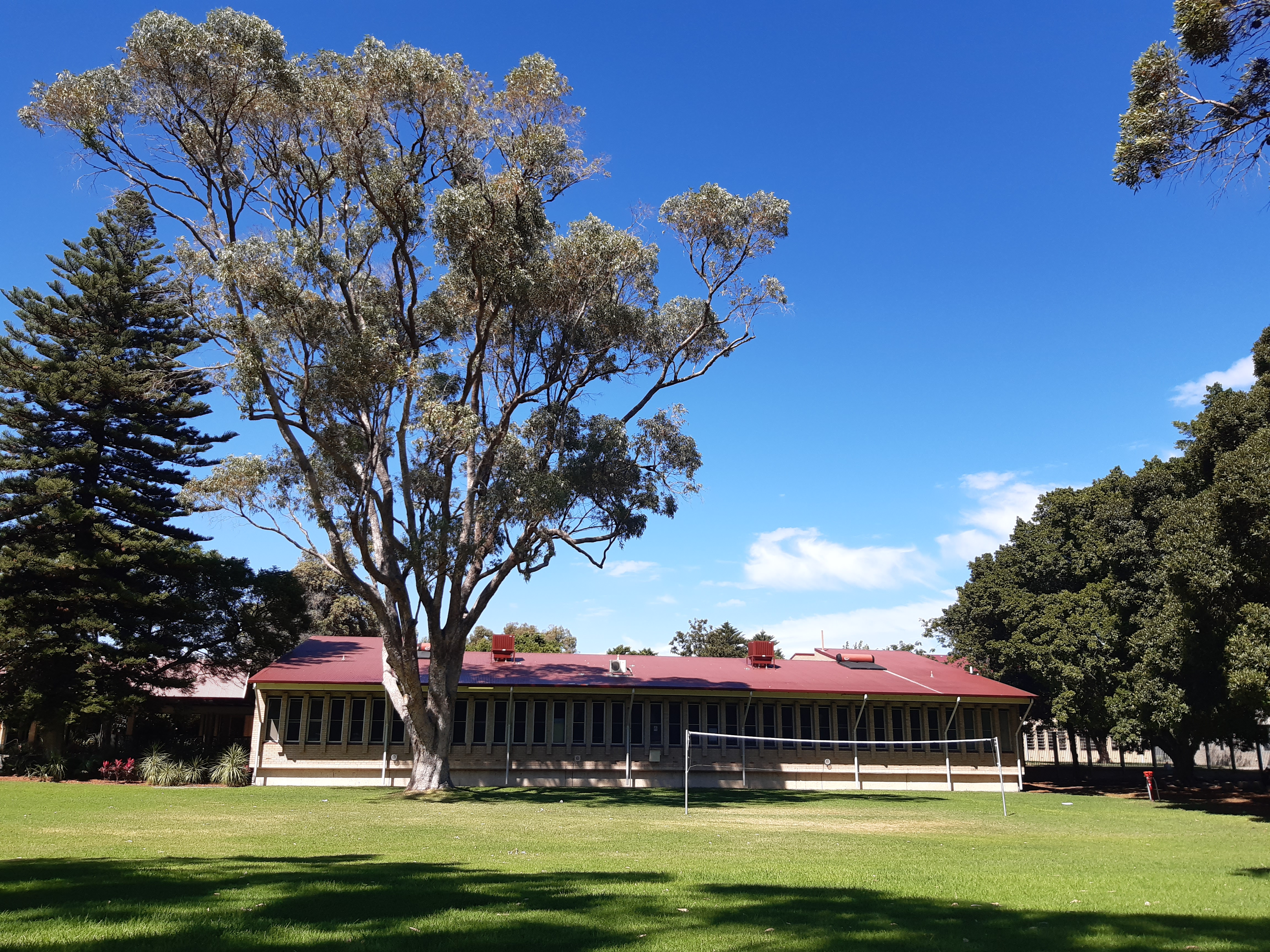
- Fremantle College in March 2021

Location
- 79 Lefroy Road, Beaconsfield, Western Australia; Australia
- Coordinates: 32°04′05″S 115°46′05″E

Information
- Type: Independent public co-educational day school
- Motto: Strength, Respect, Success
- Opened: 2018; 7 years ago
- Educational authority: WA Department of Education
- Principal: Stan Koios
- Years: 7–12
- Enrolment: 1,312 (2025)
- Campus type: Suburban
- Colour
- Website: fremantlecollege.wa.edu.au

Fremantle College is an Independent Public secondary school in Beaconsfield, Western Australia, 2 kilometres (1 mi) south-east of the port city of Fremantle, and 15 kilometres (9.3 mi) south-west of Perth, the capital city of Western Australia. It opened in 2018 following the closure of South Fremantle Senior High School and Hamilton Senior High School due to low enrolment numbers.

== Overview ==
At the end of 2013, the Government of Western Australia announced that it was looking at reforming secondary education in the Fremantle area. The Department of Education opened a survey in April 2014 for local residents to give their opinion on secondary education in Fremantle. Education minister Peter Collier hosted a meeting on 4 June at the Fremantle town hall to discuss options.

In December 2014, the government announced that Fremantle would get a new secondary school to replace South Fremantle Senior High School (SFSHS) and Hamilton Senior High School (HSHS). In 2014, SFSHS had 300 students and a capacity of 800 students, and HSHS had 440 students and a capacity of 950 students. Those two schools had limited options for subjects for a university pathway, and the merger would make offering more of those subjects viable. The plan involved no changes to John Curtin College of the Arts. A parent's lobby group suggested that local intake for John Curtin be increased instead. At the time, that school mainly took students for its performing arts program, most of whom are outside the local area.

Fremantle College opened in February 2018, for the start of that school year. SFSHS and HSHS closed at the end of the previous year. It opened on the same site as SFSHS, but facilities were significantly renovated, at a cost of $30 million. Costs were offset by the sale of the land for HSHS.

== Student numbers ==
Fremantle College has a capacity of 1,200 students. As of 2020, it had two demountable classrooms.

Year	Number
2018	1,012
2019	1,136
2020	1,205
2021	1,236
2022	1,274
2023	1,325

== See also ==
- List of schools in the Perth metropolitan area
