= Peter Capes =

Australian cricketer and businessman (born 1962)

Personal information
- Full name: Peter Andrew Capes
- Born: 26 February 1962 (age 64); East Fremantle, Western Australia
- Batting: Left-handed
- Bowling: Left-arm fast-medium
- Role: Bowler

Domestic team information
- Years: Team
- 1985/86–1992/93: Western Australia
- FC debut: 10 January 1986 Western Australia v New South Wales
- Last FC: 18 December 1992 Western Australia v Tasmania
- LA debut: 18 November 1987 Western Australia v New Zealanders
- Last LA: 27 October 1990 Western Australia v New South Wales

Career statistics
Competition	First-class	List A
Matches	40	17
Runs scored	329	30
Batting average	10.28	7.50
100s/50s	0/0	0/0
Top score	23	12
Balls bowled	7,895	873
Wickets	124	15
Bowling average	31.66	37.93
5 wickets in innings	4	0
10 wickets in match	1	0
Best bowling	6/92	3/25
Catches/stumpings	8/–	3/-
- Source: CricketArchive, 27 October 2011

Peter Andrew Capes (born 26 February 1962) is an Australian businessman and former cricketer. He has been the CEO of the Subiaco Football Club in the West Australian Football League (WAFL) since 2010.

== Cricket career ==
Educated at Melville Senior High School, Capes was a left-arm fast-medium bowler for Western Australia, taking 124 wickets in 40 first-class games. His best innings figures were 6 for 92 in Western Australia's victory over the touring Pakistan team in December 1989. He had taken five wickets in each innings against Tasmania the previous January. He also played for the Prime Minister's XI in 1987.

== Business career ==
After graduating with a Bachelor of Administration degree from Curtin University of Technology, Capes worked in the fields of human resource management and business development with Murdoch University, serving as an associate director, and Australian Quarantine and Inspection Service. He served on the West Australian cricket selection panel for two seasons between 2003 and 2005 before being appointed the CEO of East Fremantle Football Club in 2005. He left the club in 2010, and was appointed CEO of Subiaco in June 2010.
