= Abiol Lual Deng =

Political scientist from the United States

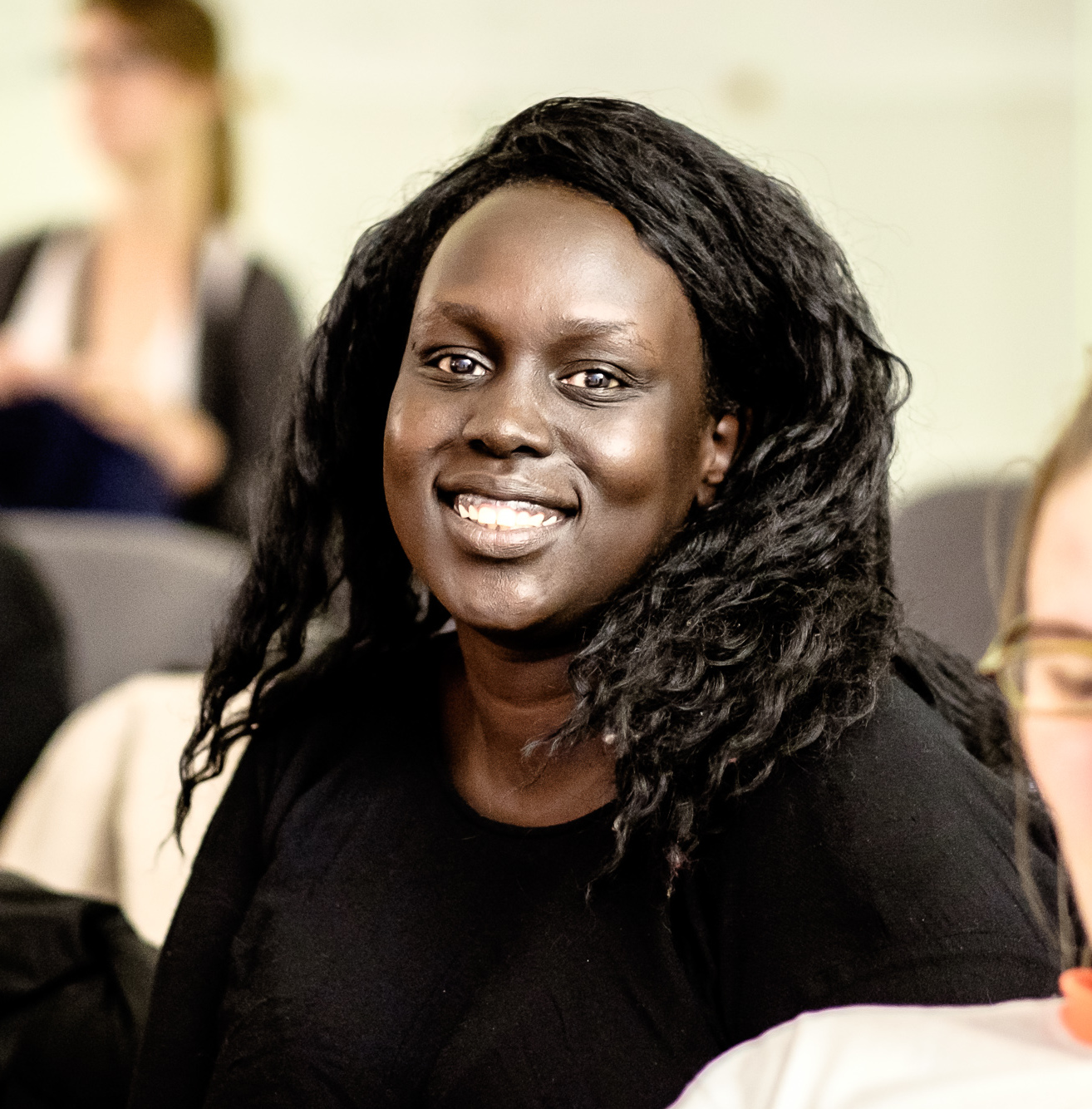
- Born: May 15, 1983 (age 43); Madison, Wisconsin, U.S.
- Education: University of Virginia (B.A.); Paris-Sorbonne University (MPhil)
- Occupation: International relations expert

Abiol Lual Deng (born 15 May 1983) is a South Sudanese-American political scientist and international relations expert.

== Biography ==
Deng was born in Madison, Wisconsin on 15 May 1983 and is of South Sudanese heritage. Her father is Lual A. Deng, an economist and advisor to the Sudanese People's Liberation Movement. She is a graduate of the University of Virginia, where she studied for a B.A. in French from 2002 to 2005. She studied at the University of Paris-Sorbonne for her MPhil, graduating in 2007.

== Career ==
Since graduation, she has worked across three continents in humanitarian assistance and conflict resolution. Her work has often focussed on issues affecting people and countries in east and central Africa and she has worked in Chad, the Democratic Republic of Congo, South Sudan and Sudan.

She has worked in the private sector, as well as for state agencies and non-governmental organisations, such as Médecins Sans Frontières. Deng has a particular interest in the use of social media in conflict situations, where state media may be biased. As of 2021, Deng was working as a Global Mentor for the University of Virginia's new course on French for Global Development.

== Selected publications ==
- Deng, A. L., 'Facts or Rumors?' Digital Development Debates (2017), 17.
- Light, E., Bacas, J. L., Dragona, D., Kämpf, K. M., Peirano, M., Pelizzer, Valentina, Rogers, C., Sprenger, F., Rowan, J., & Deng, A. L. (2018). Infrastructures of Dis/Connection: Of Drones, Migration, and Digital Care. Imaginations: Journal of Cross-Cultural Image Studies, 8(2), 56–63.
