= South Sudanese Canadians =

Total population
- 16,595 (combined North Sudan and South Sudan by ancestry); 715 (Dinka ancestry) (2011 Census)

Regions with significant populations
- Calgary, Edmonton, Toronto

Languages
- English; Nuer

Religion
- Christianity and traditional religions of South Sudan

South Sudanese Canadians are Canadians of South Sudanese ancestry, or a South Sudanese who has Canadian citizenship.

South Sudanese Canadians can also include children born in Canada to a Canadian parent and a South Sudanese parent.

South Sudanese Canadians immigrated to Canada in the 1980s and 1990s as refugees from Second Sudanese Civil War, which was a conflict from 1983 to 2005 between the central Sudanese government and the Sudan People's Liberation Army.

== Notable people ==
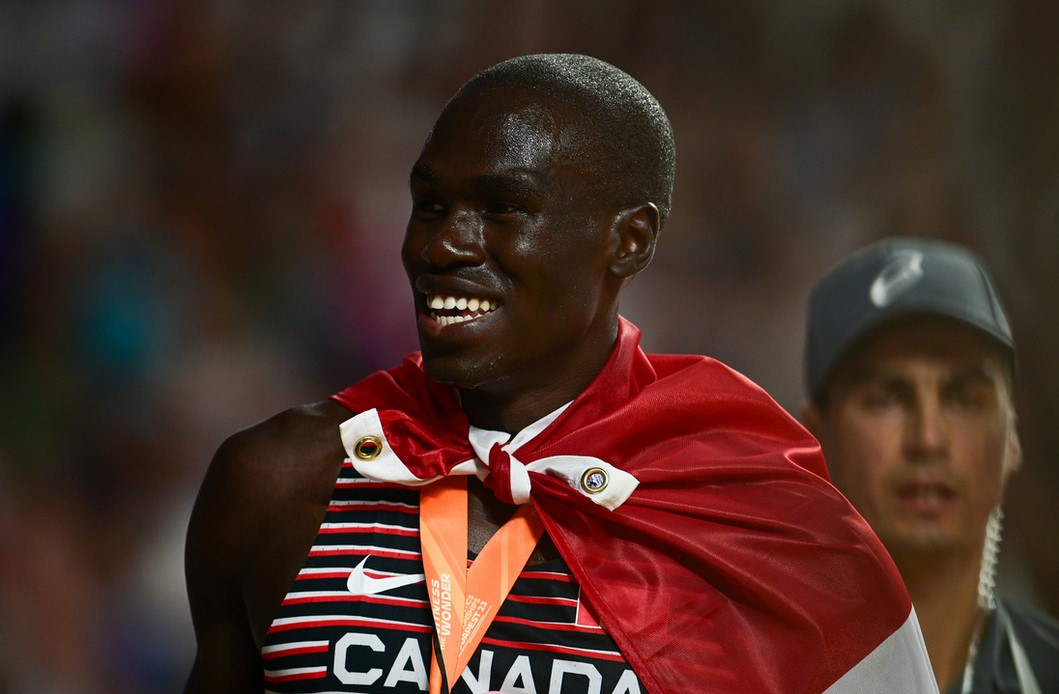
Marco Arop

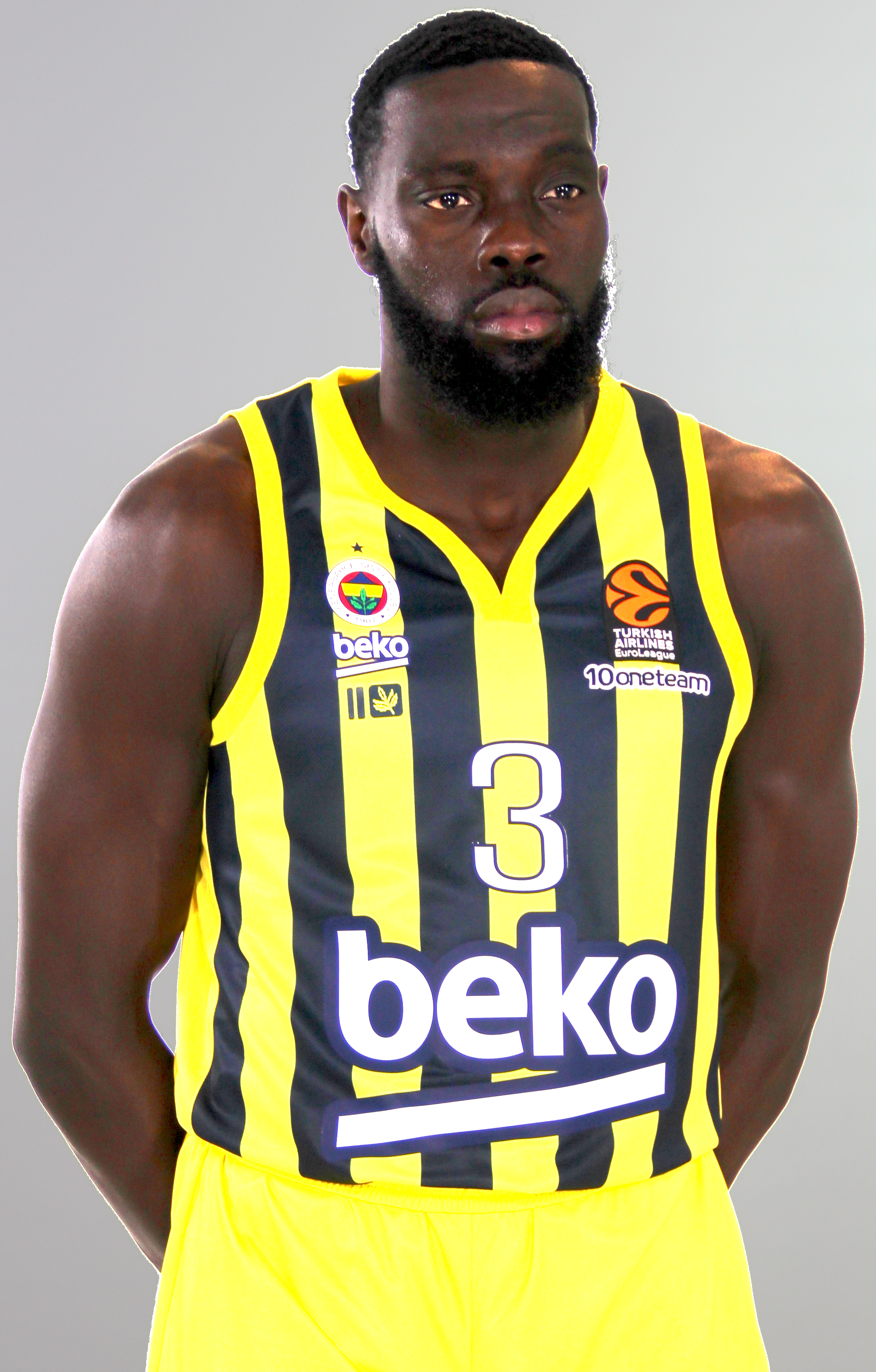
Marial Shayok

- Mangisto Arop (born 1990), professional basketball player
- Marco Arop (born 1998), Olympic and world champion track and field athlete in the middle distance events
- Adongo Agada Cham (1959–2011), king of the Anuak people of South Sudan and the corresponding Western Ethiopian border region
- Emmanuel Jal (born 1980), actor, former child soldier, and political activist
- Bol Kong (born 1988), professional basketball player
- Reema Major (born 1995), rapper
- Tut Ruach (born 1985), professional basketball player
- Marial Shayok (born 1995), basketball player in the Israeli Premier Basketball League

== See also ==
- South Sudanese Americans
- South Sudanese Australians
- Sudanese Canadians
