= Adrienne Galanek =

American diplomat

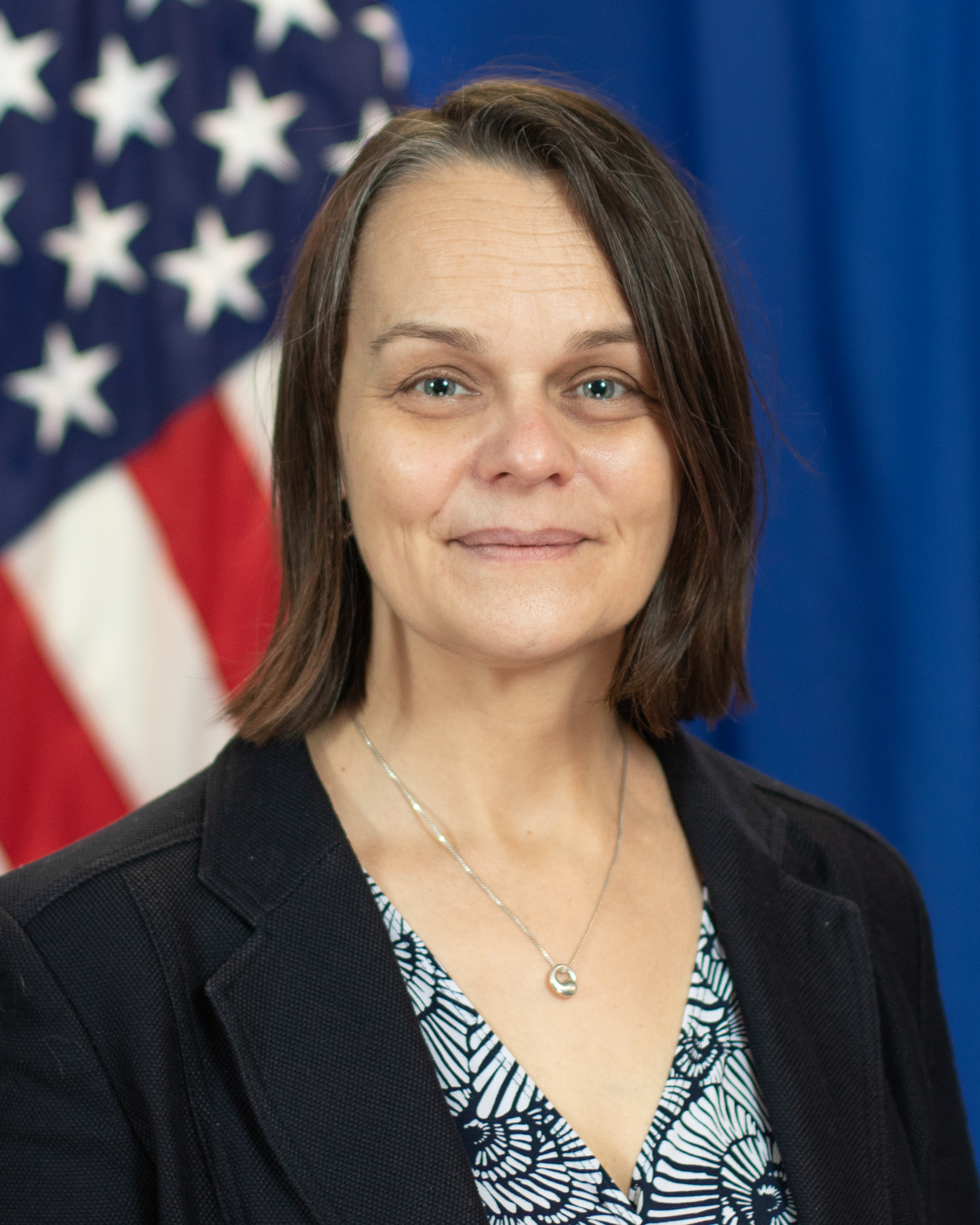

U.S. Chargé d'Affaires for Guyana
- In office September 13, 2023 – October 23, 2023
- Preceded by: Sarah-Ann Lynch (as ambassador)
- Succeeded by: Nicole D. Theriot (as ambassador)

U.S. Chargé d'Affaires for Belize
- In office January 20, 2017 – July 21, 2018
- Preceded by: Carlos R. Moreno (as ambassador)
- Succeeded by: Keith R. Gilges

Adrienne Galanek is an American diplomat. She had served as Deputy Chief of Mission at the United States Embassy in Guyana.

Galanek succeeded Ambassador Carlos R. Moreno in January 2017 as the Chargé d'Affaires at the United States Embassy in Belize. She stayed until July 2018 when she was replaced by Keith Gilges.

Diplomatic posts
Preceded by Sarah-Ann Lynch; Ambassador	United States Chargé d'Affaires for Guyana; 2023	Succeeded by Nicole D. Theriot; Ambassador
Preceded by Carlos R. Moreno; Ambassador	United States Chargé d'Affaires for Belize; 2017–2018	Succeeded by Keith R. Gilges
