= Aweng Ade-Chuol =

Sudanese-Australian model and actress

- Born: Kakuma
- Citizenship: South Sudan
- Occupations: Model, Actor

Aweng Mayen Chuol is a South Sudanese Australian model, actress, and artist.

== Early life and education ==
Chuol was born in the Kakuma Refugee Camp in Kenya, her family having fled the Second Sudanese Civil War. They moved to Australia when Chuol was seven years old. She has 11 siblings, of whom she is the eldest. Her father was a child soldier in the First Sudanese Civil War and also fought in the Second, dying as a result of an infected gunshot wound in 2006.

== Career ==
In 2017, while working at a McDonald's in Sydney at the age of 18, Chuol was noticed by an agent from Chadwick Models, who encouraged her to work with them. She signed with the organisation and began her career as a model. She has since modelled for Fenty, Vetements, and Pyer Moss, among others.

In 2020, Chuol featured in Beyoncé's musical film and visual album Black Is King, and in a Ralph Lauren holiday advertisement alongside her wife.

Chuol is studying law and psychological sciences at the University of New England, from which she graduated in 2021. She hopes to use her law degree to help marginalised people, and would like to found a mental health centre in South Sudan. Chuol also takes acting classes, and is aiming to become an actor. She cites Lupita Nyong'o and Shonda Rhimes as inspirations for her acting career.

Chuol was listed in OkayAfrica's 100 Women in 2019.

== Personal life ==
Chuol is one of 11 siblings, all of whom reside in Sydney, Australia.

Chuol met her ex-wife, Alexus, in January 2019. They dated for nine months before becoming engaged. The couple got married in December of the same year at New York City Hall, and have matching "XII" (12) tattoos on their ring fingers. Following their marriage, Chuol received homophobic abuse, particularly from communities in South Sudan, leading to her attempting suicide a few months later. She spent three days in an intensive care unit and six more in hospital as a result.

Chuol and Alexus were featured on the cover of Elle magazine in 2020. As of September 2020 the couple lived in London.

The couple got divorced at the end of December 2021.
