= Friday Zico =

South Sudanese footballer

Personal information
- Full name: Friday Oyèlé Zico Paul
- Date of birth: 1 November 1994 (age 32)
- Place of birth: Magwi, Sudan (now South Sudan)
- Height: 1.76 m (5 ft 9 in)
- Positions: Defender; striker

Team information
- Current team: Kalamunda City FC
- Number: 17

Youth career
- 2006–2008: Fremantle City FC
- 2009–2010: Melville City
- 2011: FWNTC
- 2012–2014: Perth SC
- 2009: Cockburn City

Senior career*
Years	Team	Apps	(Gls)
2013–2015	Perth SC	19	(3)
2015–2017	Cockburn City	12	(1)
2018–2021	Armadale SC	52	(1)
2022	Gwelup Croatia	15	(0)
2023-2024	Cockburn City SC	19	(5)
2025-	Kalamunda City FC	1	(0)

International career^{‡}
2015–	South Sudan	4	(0)
- * Club domestic league appearances and goals as of 24 March 2025 ‡ National team caps and goals as of 16 October 2018

Friday Zico (born 1 November 1994) is a South Sudanese professional footballer who plays as a striker for Kalamunda City FC in the State League Division 1 and the South Sudan national team.

== Personal life ==
Zico was born in a town called Magwi in South Sudan, and spent his early life in a refugee camp near the Ugandan city of Gulu, after his parents fled the Sudanese Civil War. In 2004, he and his family were accepted as refugees by Australia, and settled in the city of Perth, where he attended Melville Senior High School. Zico started playing football age 12 for Fremantle United SC in 2006 spending 3 years in the club youth system before moving to club Cockburn City Soccer club to further his education in the game in 2009. In 2010 Zico made another move to Melville City FC playing for their Men's Reserve Team in which he collected Player Of The Year and club Top goal Scorer in the Reserve League. In 2011 Zico signed with Fremantle City State League Division One. In 2012 Zico performance attracted the attention of Football West National Training Centre coach Kenny Lowe who offered Zico a scholarship in the National Development Squad.

== International career ==
On 8 June 2015 Zico made his debut as second-half substitute for South Sudan National team in an International friendly match against Kenya which ended in a 2–0 defeat. 5 days later on 13 June 2015 Zico made his full International appearance against Mali in South Sudan first ever 2017 Africa Cup of Nations qualification match which Mali won 2–0. On 1 September 2015 Zico was called up to the South Sudan national football team training camp to prepare for their 2017 African cup of Nation qualification match against Equatorial Guinea, however Zico sustained a serious knee injury during training damaging his anterior cruciate ligament, posterior cruciate ligament, medial cruciate ligament, and lateral cruciate ligament which kept him out of action for three years, there was a possibility doctor said he may never play again. On 16 October 2018, Zico made his return on the international stage playing against Gabon in the 2019 African Cup Of Nation Qualifier group Stage, playing 90 minutes of the match, Gabon went on to win the game 1–0 in South Sudan. On 16 November 2018 Friday Zico started in South Sudan second last game of the African cup of nations 2019 qualifiers against Burundi in a very disappointing match resulting in a 5–2 loss in Juba, South Sudan.
