= Mouraine =

Canadian hip-hop artist and songwriter

- Mouraine performing at Winterruption in 2025

Background information
- Origin: Edmonton, Alberta, Canada
- Genre: Hip-hop
- Occupations: Musician, songwriter
- Years active: 2010–present
- Labels: The 25th Dynasty, Birthday Cake Records, Our Own
- Website: www.mouraine.com

Mouraine is a Canadian hip-hop artist and songwriter based in Edmonton, Alberta. Born in Sudan, he began his career as a member of the Edmonton hip-hop group The Overachievers before pursuing a solo career. He released his debut studio album, In Search of Gold, through Birthday Cake Records in 2023.

In 2021, Mouraine was included in Complex Canada's list of 25 Canadian Artists to Watch. He has received multiple nominations for Rap & Hip Hop Artist of the Year at the Western Canadian Music Awards. His music has also been featured in advertising campaigns for Foot Locker.

== Early life ==
Mouraine was born in Sudan. He left the country with his mother and siblings, initially relocating to Egypt before arriving in Canada as asylum seekers. The family settled in north Edmonton in 2005, when he was 10 years old.

Growing up in Edmonton, Mouraine developed an interest in hip-hop and poetry, which helped him learn English. He has cited Somali-Canadian rapper and singer K'naan as an early musical influence.

== Career ==
=== The Overachievers and early career ===
Mouraine began performing with his younger brothers Namso and Moto as part of the Edmonton hip-hop group The Overachievers, also known as T.O.A.

In August 2020, the brothers reunited on Mouraine's single "Shutdown", their first recording together in several years.

Fellow Edmonton rapper Arlo Maverick served as an early mentor to Mouraine.

In 2017, the music video for his single "Poppin'" was featured on Noisey, the music platform operated by Vice Media.

=== 2020–2022: Complex recognition and Bigger Dreams ===
Mouraine performing at the Starlite Room in Edmonton.

In 2020, Mouraine released several singles, including "Open Letter to America", "Shutdown", "Hoopty" and "Lion Hearted".

In January 2021, Mouraine was included in Complex Canada's "25 Canadian Artists to Watch Out For in 2021". The publication highlighted his singles "Hoopty", "Open Letter to America", "Lion Hearted" and "Shutdown".

In 2021, Mouraine released the extended play Bigger Dreams, which included the single "Do Dat Dance".

Following the release of the EP, "Do Dat Dance" was featured in a Foot Locker advertising campaign. The collaboration was later documented by Footwear Magazine in its coverage of another partnership between Mouraine and the retailer.

Mouraine received nominations for Rap & Hip Hop Artist of the Year at the Western Canadian Music Awards in 2021 and 2022.

In May 2022, he performed at Liverpool Sound City in England. A review published by The Guardian discussed his performance at The Jacaranda, where he appeared among the festival's relatively few hip-hop acts.

=== 2023: In Search of Gold ===
Cover artwork for Mouraine's 2023 album In Search of Gold.

In February 2023, Mouraine announced his debut studio album, In Search of Gold, accompanied by the lead single "Gold". The album was released on May 5, 2023, through Birthday Cake Records.

The album was produced by deadmen, a production duo comprising two members of the Canadian indie rock band Royal Canoe. The album includes collaborations with American rapper Westside Boogie and Canadian R&B singer JRDN.

The album explores themes of identity, ambition, personal development and relationships. It received coverage from CBC Music, Exclaim!, Edmonton Journal and Taproot Edmonton.

According to figures published by Vitriol Independent Promo, In Search of Gold reached number five on the North American College and Community Radio (NACC) Hip-Hop Adds chart, number eight on the NACC Hip-Hop chart, and number four on the Canadian national campus radio hip-hop chart.

Mouraine promoted the album with performances in the United Kingdom, including appearances at The Great Escape Festival in Brighton and Focus Wales in Wrexham.

=== 2024–present: Performances and collaborations ===
Mouraine performing live wearing an Edmonton Oilers jersey.

In July 2024, Mouraine performed at the Calgary Stampede's Coca-Cola Stage. His appearance was included in the festival's official artist lineup.

Mouraine received further nominations for Rap & Hip Hop Artist of the Year at the Western Canadian Music Awards in 2024, 2025 and 2026.

In 2025, Mouraine collaborated with Foot Locker on a second campaign, this time involving his single "Mojo" and the Canadian Elite Basketball League. The partnership was covered by Footwear Magazine in November 2025.

== Discography ==
=== Studio albums ===
- In Search of Gold (2023)

=== Extended plays ===
- Bigger Dreams (2021)

=== Mixtapes ===
- Cold Mornings (2014)
- Cold Mornings 2 (2017)

=== Selected singles ===
- "Poppin'" (2017)
- "Winning" (2019)
- "Open Letter to America" (2020)
- "Shutdown" (2020)
- "Hoopty" (2020)
- "Lion Hearted" (2020)
- "Badmon" (2021)
- "Do Dat Dance" (2021)
- "Gold" (2023)
- "Tonight" (2023)
- "Big Dawg" (featuring Westside Boogie) (2023)
- "Mojo" (2025)

== Awards and nominations ==
Year	Award	Category	Result
2021	Western Canadian Music Awards	Rap & Hip Hop Artist of the Year	Nominated
2022	Western Canadian Music Awards	Rap & Hip Hop Artist of the Year	Nominated
2024	Western Canadian Music Awards	Rap & Hip Hop Artist of the Year	Nominated
2025	Western Canadian Music Awards	Rap & Hip Hop Artist of the Year	Nominated
2026	Western Canadian Music Awards	Rap & Hip Hop Artist of the Year	Nominated
