= Jackson Morgan =

South Sudanese footballer (born 1998)

Personal information
- Full name: Jackson Obede Morgan
- Date of birth: 18 August 1998 (age 28)
- Place of birth: Khartoum, Sudan
- Height: 1.82 m (6 ft 0 in)
- Position: Central midfielder

Team information
- Current team: Perth Azzurri

Youth career
- Balcatta FC
- Perth Glory

Senior career*
Years	Team	Apps	(Gls)
2017	Floreat Athena	25	(0)
2018	Hume City	18	(0)
2019	Dianella White Eagles	9	(0)
2019	Stirling Lions	9	(0)
2020	Perth SC	13	(1)
2022	Shahre Khodro	0	(0)
2023–2025	Bentleigh Greens	47	(4)
2025–	Perth Azzurri	8	(1)

International career^{‡}
2019–	South Sudan	6	(0)
- * Club domestic league appearances and goals as of 6 March 2026 ‡ National team caps and goals as of 9 September 2019

Jackson Obede Morgan (born 18 August 1998) is a professional footballer who plays as a central midfielder for Perth Azzurri in NPL WA. Born in Sudan and raised in Australia, he plays for the South Sudan national team.
