= Maban people =

People group in South Sudan and Ethiopia

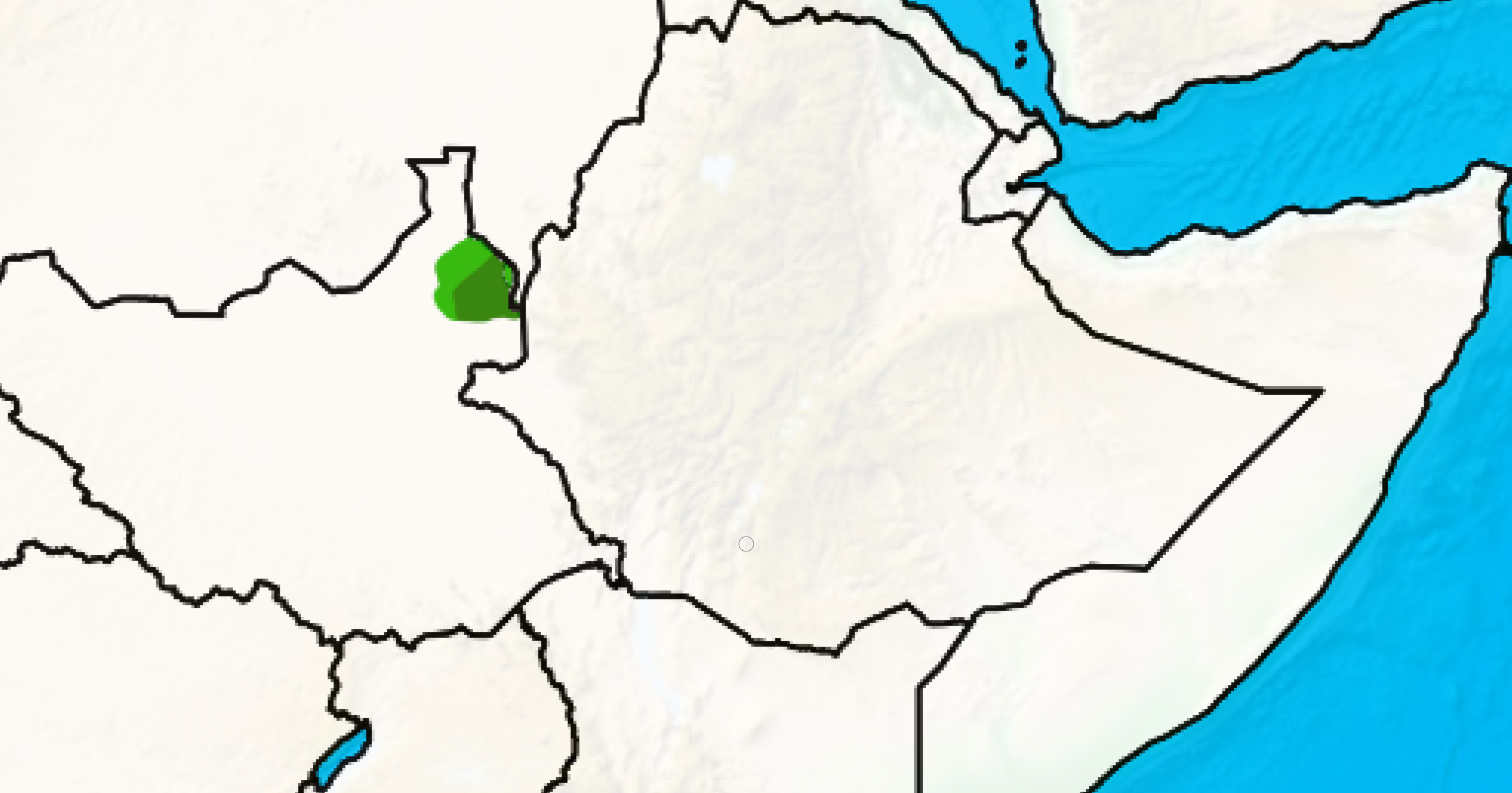

Total population
- ~113,900

Regions with significant populations
- Ethiopia, South Sudan

Languages
- Maban

Religion
- Christianity, Animism

The Maban, also referred to as the Maaban, Burun, or Chai, are a Nilotic ethnic group of about 110,000 to 113,900 people in the Upper Nile state of South Sudan and, in smaller populations, Ethiopia. The Maban inhabit pockets of land (considering the Sudanese border) from Nile east of the city of Renk, north of the Sobat River until the foothills of the Ethiopian Highlands. Many are IDPs due to war.

The Maban in South Sudan account for the majority of the Maban population, with anywhere from 103,000 to about 107,000 (a deduced amount by the count of them in Ethiopia). In Ethiopia, they number from around 5,400 to 5,800, with other estimates reaching around 7,000 and over 10,000. The Maban are the majority people group in Maban County among others, also being the most prominent in towns like Bunj.

== History ==
=== Early History & Migration ===
The Maban, along with the Luo in contemporary Kenya, are speculated to have bisected from the Shilluk. The people group could have originally been stationed near the confluence of the Nile and Blue Nile rivers, particularly near Khartoum. During the collapse of Makuria, they would've moved south to the area near the Yabus River today at around the time of the 15th century.

=== Modern Era ===
As a result of the Scramble for Africa, the regions of which they lived were held by Anglo-Egyptian Sudan under the British Empire. During this period, the regions were looted and ransacked for ivory by other African peoples, and the people fell into the fate of slavery by the British. However, the organization of these slave camps in which they were stationed managed to deter the raiders. In the 20th century, the Maban as well as other peoples saw a major improvement in their quality of life; medical facilities, irrigation systems, roads, and administration, which were established and imposed by the Europeans.

== Culture ==
=== Religion ===
The Maban are mostly animist, making of the vast majority of their population. Another 15% of their population are Christian and the rest are of a similar traditional African religion. Their Christian minority differentiates them from their surroundings peoples and communities as they have larger minorities if not majorities (which make up over a quarter of the region). 5% of the Christian population is evangelical.

=== Society and Tradition ===
Maban people live along linear settlements, which each thatched-roof mud hut spread 200 yards apart from each other. In terms of organization of Maban society, different lines of kinship are their own individual clan. Each lineage in headed by a chief who maintains justice and order of his settlement. Reports by Charles and Brenda Seligman in 1932 and by the Danish Demining Group in 2011 suggested that Mabaan society is more loosely structured than other Luo people, and that the power of local chiefs is limited by the geographic dispersal of the community and the lack of legitimacy surrounding their power.

Their pastoral lifestyle results in many traditions being agricultural and food-based. Various traditions include Kornga, a spiritual event in October in which the community confesses their sins and request forgiveness to their god, also usually asking for good health for all important livestock in their lives, with various ceremonial practices following like dancing and drinking sorghum beer; and in December, Gatti, are harvest feast celebration in which future spouses prepare for marriage.

The Maban people rely heavily on their livestock for their livelihood. They raise cattle, along with sheep, goats, pigs, and hens. Cattle are considered vital for the tribe's survival and are given exceptional care. One specific practice involves tethering cattle near fires at night to protect them from insect bites.

Maban villages will usually always have a vegetable garden in order for the civilians to maintain a proper diet; cattle is usually not maintained due to disease. As a result, other options are used, and hunting is an integral part of lifestyle by the men. Of which, includes spearfishing.

==== Marriage ====
In Maban culture, the main purpose of marriage is for expansion of the family. Any child, no matter the gender, will be accepted to a family. However, marriage mostly happens in a select timespan, under specifically in the month of December. In marriages, both the woman's husband and maternal uncle play large roles in the marriage ceremony. The typical dowry in Maban culture includes several pigs, cows, and cultivation tools like hoes and axes.

== Economy ==
The people inhabit a region which has quite an assortment of fertility for the soil, ranging from high to low. And, taken into account, the lifestyle of the people has been primarily under agricultural occupations. The main crops they cultivate, primarily based on the region's forte, are crops like sorghum, maize, sweet potatoes, and pumpkins. In terms of livestock, compared to others, they have not many cattle per family, however they tend to raise gallinaceous fowl, goats and pigs for domestic use and trade.
