= Adongo Agada Cham =

King of the Anuak people (1959–2011)

King Adongo Agada Akwai Cham (January 1, 1959 – November 30, 2011) was King of the approx. 96,000 Anuak people of South Sudan and the corresponding Western Ethiopian border region. He is the 23rd King of the Anuak Nyiudola Royal Dynasty and was considered by some of the Anuak to be a demigod.

Former teacher in Sudan and factory-worker in Canada, he succeeded his father who was king for almost 60 years. Cham had been living in Ottawa, Ontario, Canada as a refugee from Sudan's civil war when he was called back to Sudan to take the throne in 2001. He ruled from the village of Otalo where he had constructed the kingdom's first school, clinic and airstrip.

Adongo Agada Cham died on November 30, 2011 at a hospital in Nairobi, Kenya.

== See also ==
- South Sudanese Canadians
