= Bigoa Nyuon =

Australian rules footballer

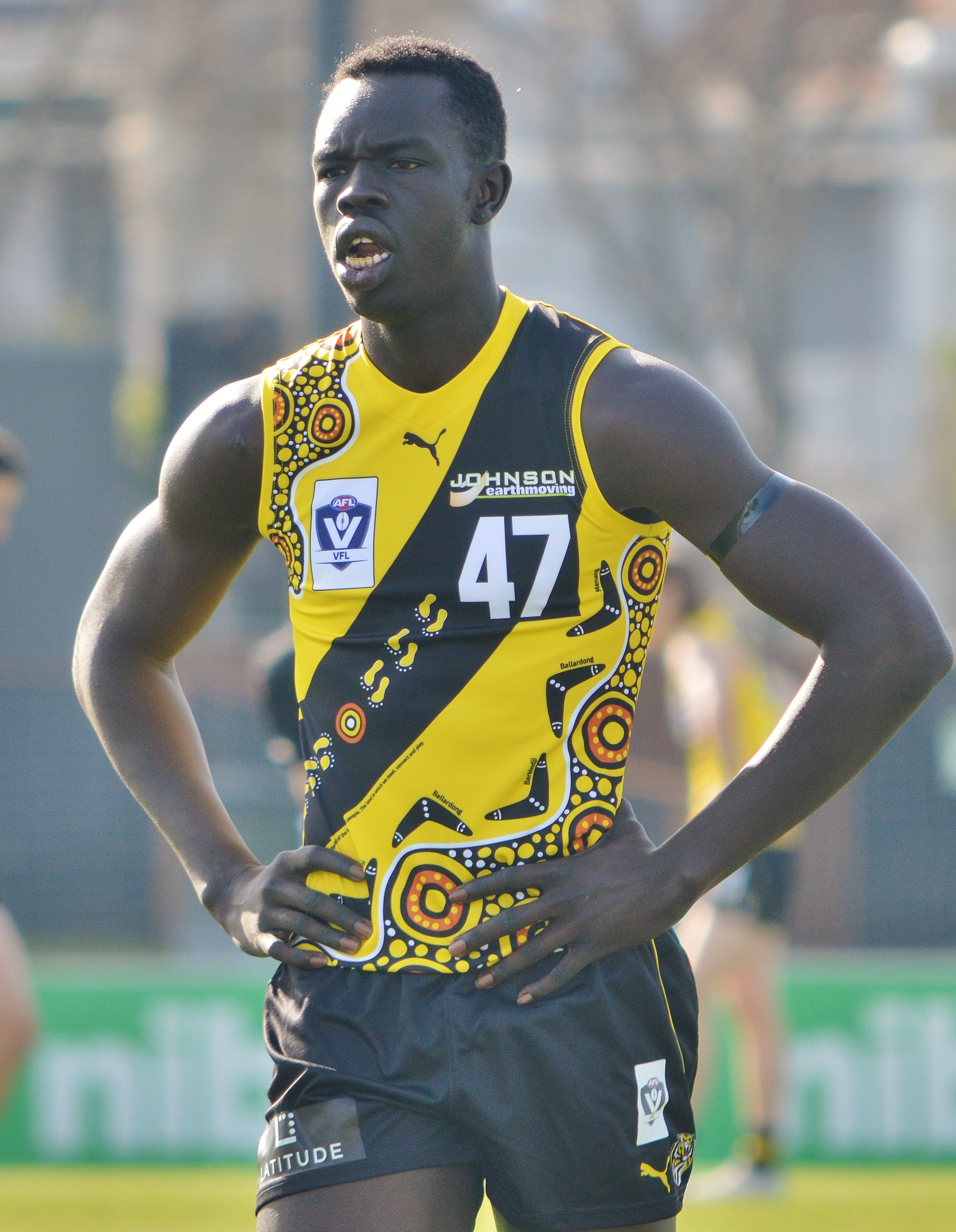
- Nyuon with Richmond's VFL team in July 2021

Personal information
- Nickname: Biggie
- Born: 18 May 2001 (age 25); Nairobi, Kenya
- Original team: Dandenong Stingrays (NAB League)/Rowville Football Club
- Draft: No. 54, 2019 AFL National Draft: Richmond
- Debut: Round 9, 2022, Richmond vs. Hawthorn, at MCG
- Height: 205 cm (6 ft 9 in)
- Weight: 103 kg (227 lb)
- Position: Key Defender

Playing career
Years	Club	Games (Goals)
2020–2023	Richmond	1 (0)
2024	North Melbourne	3 (0)
Total		4 (0)

Bigoa Nyuon (born 18 May 2001) is an Australian rules footballer who played for Richmond and North Melbourne in the Australian Football League (AFL). He played his first AFL match in round 9 of the 2022 AFL season against Hawthorn.

Nyuon was traded to North Melbourne following the 2023 AFL season. He was delisted at the end of the 2024 season.

== Personal life ==
Nyuon was born in Nairobi, Kenya to a family of South Sudanese people. His sister Nyadol Nyuon is a lawyer and human rights activist.

== Statistics ==
Legend
G	Goals	K	Kicks	D	Disposals	T	Tackles
B	Behinds	H	Handballs	M	Marks

Season	Team	No.	Games	Totals							Averages (per game)							Votes
Season	Team	No.	Games	G	B	K	H	D	M	T	G	B	K	H	D	M	T	Votes
2020 (Note: The 2020 season was played with 17 home-and-away matches per team (down from 22) and 16-minute quarters with time on (down from 20-minute quarters with time on) due to the impact of the COVID-19 pandemic.)		47	0	—	—	—	—	—	—	—	—	—	—	—	—	—	—	0
2021		47	0	—	—	—	—	—	—	—	—	—	—	—	—	—	—	0
2022	Richmond	47	1	0	0	2	4	6	0	2	0.0	0.0	2.0	4.0	6.0	0.0	2.0	0
2023		47	0	—	—	—	—	—	—	—	—	—	—	—	—	—	—	0
2024	North Melbourne	28	3	0	0	29	14	43	18	7	0.0	0.0	9.7	4.7	14.3	6.0	2.3	0
Career			4	0	0	31	18	49	18	9	0.0	0.0	7.8	4.5	12.3	4.5	2.3	0
