= Malcolm R. Barnebey =

American diplomat (1927–2023)

United States Ambassador to Belize
- In office October 29, 1981 – July 10, 1985
- President: Ronald Reagan
- Succeeded by: Keith Guthrie

Personal details
- Born: November 8, 1927 Omaha, Nebraska, U.S.
- Died: March 19, 2023 (aged 95)
- Education: North Texas State University

Malcolm Richard Barnebey (November 8, 1927 – March 19, 2023) was an American diplomat who served as the first United States Ambassador to Belize.

== Life and career ==
Born in Omaha, Nebraska on November 8, 1927, he graduated from North Texas State University (now the University of North Texas) with a B.A. in 1949 and an M.A., 1951. His foreign languages are Spanish and German.

Barnebey served in the United States Army in 1946. He was a teaching assistant at North Texas State University from 1949 to 1950, and an instructor at Weatherford College from 1950 to 1952.

Barnebey entered the Foreign Service in 1952 as political officer in Vienna and was economic officer in La Paz from 1955 to 1957. From 1957 to 1958 he attended advanced economic studies at the University of California at Berkeley. He was foreign affairs officer in the Department from 1958 to 1961. Barnebey was deputy principal officer in Guayaquil (1961–1963) and program officer in Quito on detail at the Agency for International Development (1963–1964). From 1964 to 1967 he was Deputy Director, then Director of the Office of Ecuadorean-Peruvian Affairs in the Department. He was Deputy Chief of Mission in Managua (1967–1970) and in La Paz (1970–1972).

Barnebey attended the executive seminar in national and international affairs at the Foreign Service Institute, from 1972 to 1973. From 1973 to 1976, he was Deputy Chief of Mission in Lima. In the Department he was Deputy Director of the National Security Council Interdepartmental Groups, and Director of Policy and Plans (1976–1977), and Director of Andean Affairs (1977–1980).

From 1980 he was principal officer, then chargé d'affaires, in Belize City.

Malcolm R. Barnebey died on March 19, 2023, at the age of 95.

== Sources ==
- This article incorporates text from his nomination by President Ronald Reagan, which is in the public domain.
