= Hamilton Senior High School =

Former high school in Western Australia

Location
- Hamilton Hill, Perth, Western Australia; Australia; 32°05′05″S 115°47′42″E

Information
- Other name: Hamilton Hill Senior High School
- Type: Public co-educational high school
- Motto: Be True
- Established: 1962
- Status: Closed
- Closed: 15 December 2017
- Principal: Paul Bottcher
- Enrolment: 580 (2011)
- Campus type: Suburban
- Website: hamilton.wa.edu.au at the Wayback Machine (archived 16 September 2017)

Hamilton Senior High School was a public co-educational high school on Purvis Street in Hamilton Hill, a suburb of Perth, Western Australia. The school was often referred to as Hamilton Hill Senior High School, and educated students in Year 7 to Year 12 from its establishment in 1962 until its closure on 15 December 2017.

== Overview ==
After opening in 1962, an enrolment of 1350 students was reached by 1971. The large enrolment numbers and other factors led to the introduction of the "sub-school" system at Hamilton Senior High School from 1975, consisting of three lower-school sub-schools—Delta, Grinceri (later renamed Leda), and Omega—each containing students from years 8 to 10, with students in years 11 and 12 in a separate upper school.

The school enrolled 696 students in 2007, 675 in 2008, 711 in 2009, then fell to 622 in 2010 and to 580 in 2011. The fall in student numbers from 2010 is a result of the enrolment age changing for students entering high school in Western Australia.

On 12 December 1962 a worker, Velko Garbin, suffered fatal injuries sustained by a nail gun incident during the construction of the school. A plaque honouring him was placed in the entry of the school library.

The school suffered an arson attack in 2010 when a metal shed was set alight, causing A$100,000 in damage.

Plans to close the school and merge students with South Fremantle Senior High School as a new school were announced in December 2014. The larger number of students would allow for more opportunities and subjects for students. The school was closed permanently at the end of the 2017 school year. From 2018, Hamilton Senior High School students joined students of the also-defunct South Fremantle Senior High School to form Fremantle College.

The buildings of the former Hamilton Senior High School were earmarked for demolition and the land designated for housing.

== See also ==
- List of schools in the Perth metropolitan area
