= Eugene L. Scassa =

American ambassador (1939–2012)

Eugene Luiga Scassa (February 6, 1939 – March 22, 2012) was an American diplomat who was a career Foreign Service Officer. He served as the U.S. Ambassador Extraordinary and Plenipotentiary to Belize from 1990 until 1994.

Scassa was born in Monaca, Pennsylvania on February 6, 1939. In addition, Scassa was the executive director of the Bureau for Inter-American Affairs, and the Assistant to U.N. Ambassador Madeleine Albright. He began the ESMOAS (then called the San Antonio Model OAS) in 1995. Scassa died on March 22, 2012, at the age of 73.
