= Adau Mornyang =

Australian model

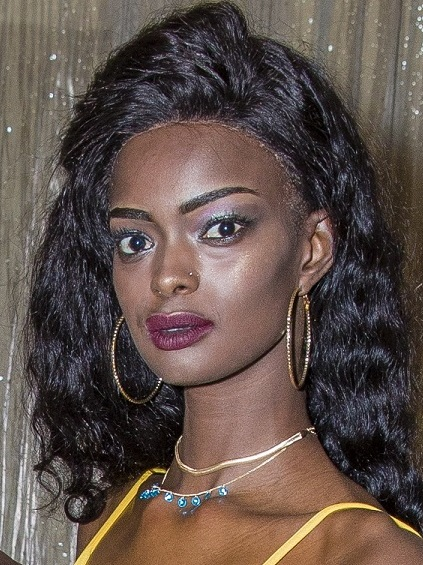
- Mornyang at the Variety Australia children's charity fundraiser
- Born: 1994 (age 31–32); Sudan
- Occupation: Model
- Known for: Speaking on Social issues
- Modeling information
- Hair color: Black
- Eye color: Brown
- Agency: LookFlashPrint!

Adau Mornyang (born 1994) is an Australian model, and beauty pageant finalist. She has become an advocate against rape victim/blaming culture, particularly in Sudanese communities. She spoke out on Facebook about her assault that occurred at age 17 in Adelaide which attracted national media coverage and international on the issue, since then she has spoken of other issues which made news. She made headlines in 2019 after getting arrested in the United States for assaulting a flight attendant on a flight from Australia, for reach she received probation and community service hours. After handing down the verdict, the judge told Adau he wanted her to have a wonderful life.

== Miss World Australia Finalist ==
Mornyang competed for the Miss World Australia 2017 title at the Rendezvous Hotel against 30 other contenders, there she progressed to the final eight, Mornyang vowed to use the Miss world platform to inspire people and speak out against rape in communities which sweep the criminal acts under the rug.

== Personal life ==
Mornyang migrated to Australia when she was 10 as a refugee from war-torn Sudan unable to speak English, Mornyang moved from Sydney to Melbourne on her own at age 17, and from 19 to 22 her career in modelling prospered having worked as a global campaign face for Sephora and recently in 2019 walked the runway at New York Fashion week. Working in the top fashion cities of the world, such as London, Paris and New York Mornyang kept to her goal of becoming a positive role model for her community, using the Miss World platform and the news media to achieve it.

== Speaking on social issues ==
=== Rape victim-blaming ===
Mornyang a victim of sexual assault herself was inundated after posting her experience on a one-hour-long Facebook video from women who had faced similar assaults as well as positive messages, in the case of her sexual assault and rape she was bullied into asking the police to drop the charges laid against the offenders. Mornyang spoke out against victim-blaming but received a backlash from men in her community.

=== Apex teen crime wave ===
Mornyang urged Sudanese parents and leaders in the Melbourne community to be proactive and play a more serious role of the teens who have been involved in violent crime, She believes African immigrants were not taking note of serious mental health issues in teenagers, thus turning them towards a life of violence and drug abuse. Mornyang told Herald Sun that the Sudanese community needed to integrate more by both teaching teenagers about their heritage and the local Australian cultures and laws.

=== Positive body image ===
Mornyang offered advice to young girls dealing with something that they feel insecure about their body by talking about her scar she received on her face. She told Teen Vogue that she embraced her scar for the way it made her different and unique, and that people will try to bully others some stage because there will always be something they dislike. Mornyang ended by stating We all have scars, some you can see, some you can't. I'm lucky you can see mine.

== United Airlines incident ==
On a January 21, 2019 United Airlines flight from Melbourne to Los Angeles, Mornyang was involved in a physical altercation with a flight attendant. Audio was released showing her drunkenly yelling obscenities and racial slurs and abused the airline crew after they investigated complaints about her behavior from fellow passengers. The incident escalated when she slapped a member of the flight crew and had to be handcuffed by a federal air marshal. About two hours before the flight landed, she was allowed to use the restroom, where she stayed for the remainder of the flight. She was arrested upon the plane's arrival in Los Angeles.

In March 2019, she was found guilty of a felony charge of interference with a flight crew member and a misdemeanor count of assault by a Los Angeles jury. At her trial, it was disclosed that she had to be carried out of the plane by air marshals. After her trial, she stated that she did not remember what had happened, but might have mixed prescription drugs with too much alcohol during the flight.

On July 15, 2019, Adau was sentenced to 3 years probation and 100 hours of community services. Alongside, she was to receive mental health counseling and submit to drug tests. US District Court Judge Cormac J. Carney said he believed Adau was deeply remorseful for the incident and did not deserve to go to prison and that he wanted her to have a wonderful life. Adau had read a statement that she was currently trying to deal with emotions and anxiety brought on by childhood trauma through proper medical treatment, not drugs and alcohol like she had done earlier in her life.
