= Carolyn Curiel =

American academic, journalist and diplomat

Carolyn Curiel (born 1954) is an American academic, journalist and former diplomat.

Curiel was born in 1954. She was a clinical professor of communication at Purdue University Brian Lamb School of Communication, executive director of the defunct Purdue Institute for Civic Communication (PICC). The PICC was closed at the end of 2017 and Curiel left Purdue University.

Curiel has also been an Emmy-nominated producer and writer for Ted Koppel at Nightline, head of the Caribbean Division for United Press International, editor at The Washington Post, President Clinton's senior speechwriter and later, Ambassador to Belize.
