= Australian rules football in Africa =

List of AFL Leagues by country

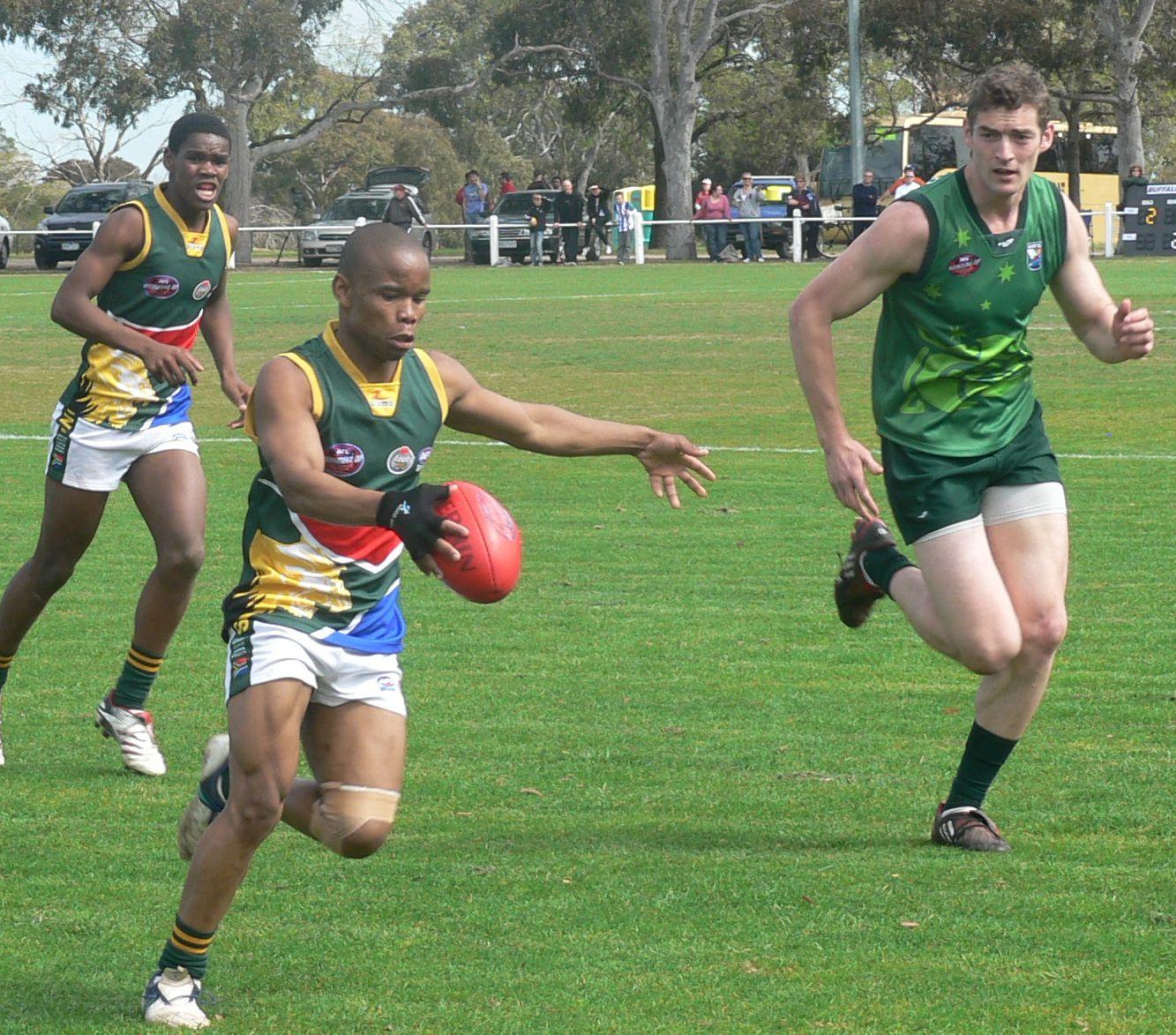
The South African Lions in action against Ireland during the 2008 Australian Football International Cup in Melbourne

Australian rules football in Africa is most organised in South Africa, although there are programs under development in many African nations including Botswana, Egypt, Ghana, Kenya and Zimbabwe and there are plans to introduce the sport into more African countries.

Immigration to Australia saw a rise in the number of Africans playing in the Australian Football League, among the first were African-Americans like Tom Banks and South Africans including Aubrey MacKenzie and Damien Cupido.

Kevin Sheedy predicted an African future for the AFL when he recruited Ethiopian Goaner Tutlan in 2004. The success of Majak Daw saw a rise in the popularity of AFL among South Sudanese migrants which have attracted the attention of AFL recruiters in search for the combination of height and athleticism. An increasing number of players descended from the Indigenous peoples of Africa have played professionally in the Australian Football League, holding African Australian identity. Tall Sudanese players are now sought by AFL recruiters to fill key positions including the ruck.

== Botswana ==
The government of Botswana approached the AFL in 2009 with a view to extending the FootyWILD program from South Africa across the border into Botswana. Australian football in South Africa began in the North West Province, an area bordering Botswana and with numerous cultural, linguistic and historical ties to the neighboring country.

== Ethiopia ==
While the sport hasn't been played in Ethiopia, the country is notable for producing AFL players from the migrant community in Australia.

=== Notable players ===
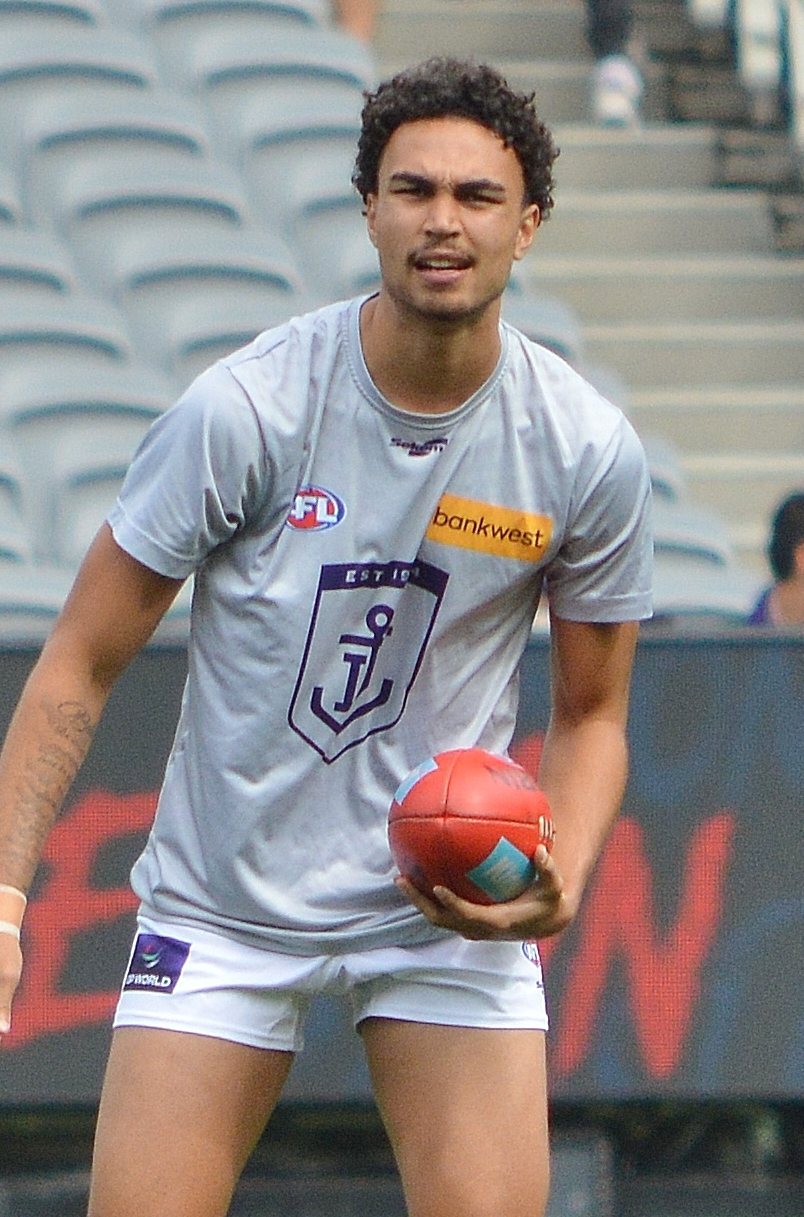
Josh Draper with Fremantle in 2025

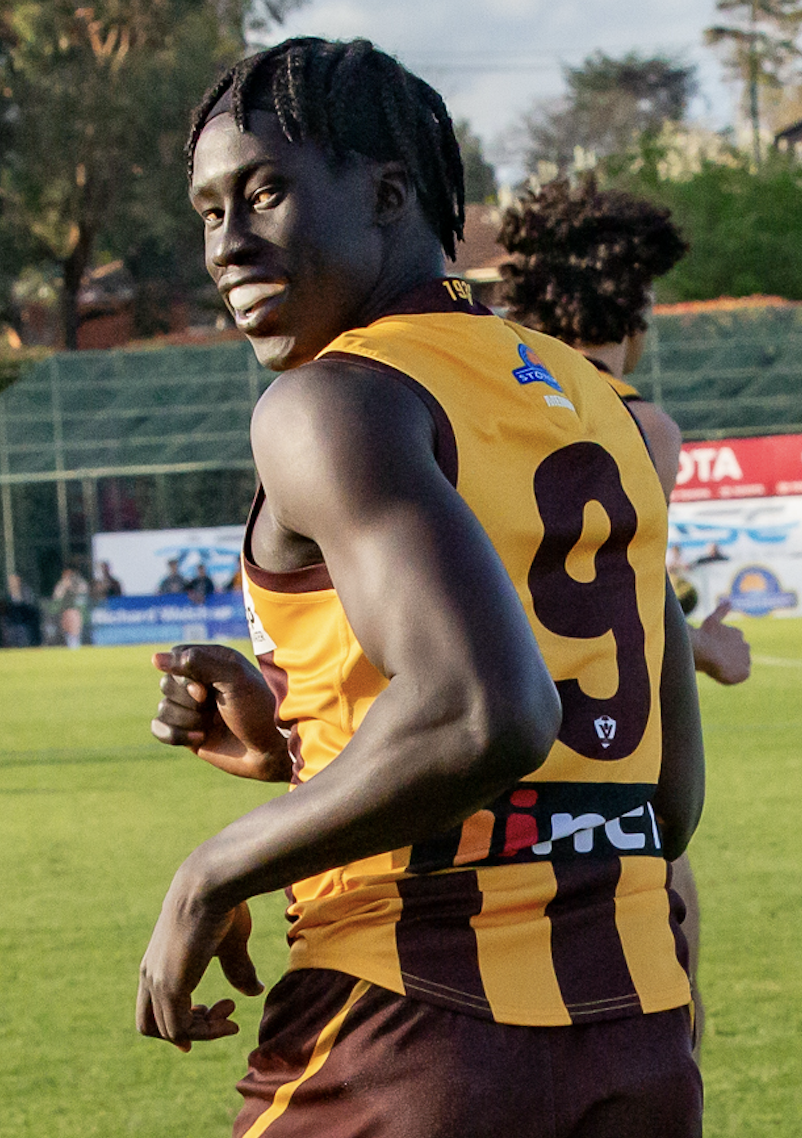
Changkuoth Jiath of Hawthorn in 2024

Player	AFL/AFLW Years*	AFL/AFLW Matches*	AFL/AFLW Goals*	Connections to Ethiopia, References
Tew Jiath	2024-	1	0	Born
Josh Draper	2024-	11	0	Mother
Changkuoth Jiath	2018-	45	2	Born Mekelle
Goaner Tutlan	2004	-	-	Born

== Egypt ==
Australian rules football was played by the ANZACs in Egypt during World War I. The sport has since been revived by Australian expats, with an Auskick program being started in Cairo. The Australian Embassy in Cairo has backed the program.

=== Notable players ===
Player	AFL/AFLW Years*	AFL/AFLW Matches*	AFL/AFLW Goals*	Connections to Egypt, References	AFL/AFLW Football club
James Borlase	2023-	1	0	Born Cairo	Adelaide Football Club
Mac Andrew	2022-	10	0	Born Cairo	Gold Coast Suns
Ahmed Saad	2012-2015	33	48	Parents	St Kilda Football Club

== Ghana ==
Australian football was played on a non-organised level in Ghana in 2007, where traveling Australians played with children.

In early 2009, AFL club the Western Bulldogs announced that they were in talks with Azumah Nelson regarding the introduction of Australian rules football at the Azumah Nelson Foundation (AZNEF) Sports Academy. Nelson was quoted as saying "Once we become familiar with handling the oval shaped ball, I am sure that Ghana will produce many champions for the AFL Clubs in Australia" The Bulldogs also stated that they may travel to Ghana to visit the AZNEF Sports Academy in future.

=== Notable players ===
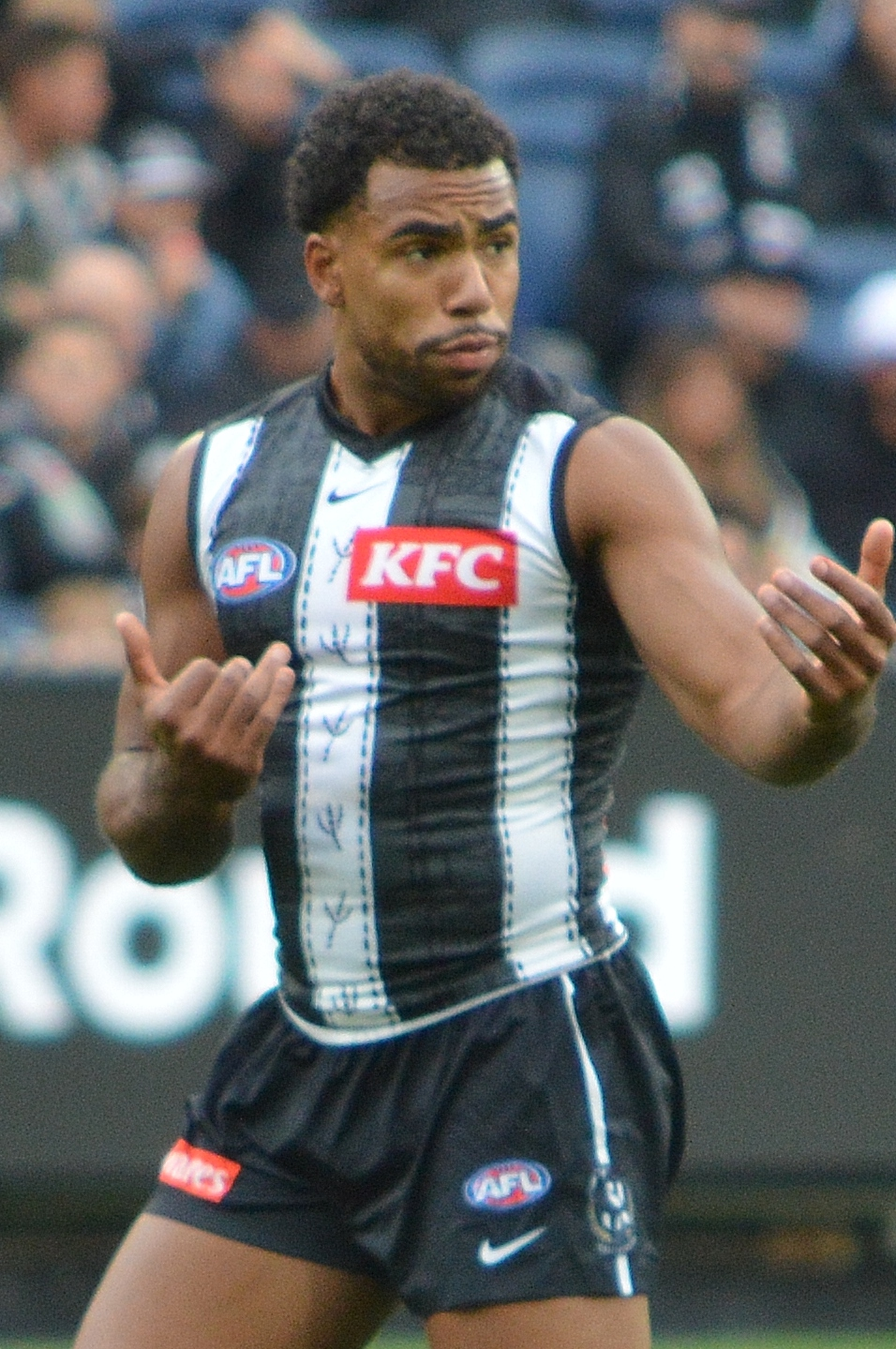
Isaac Quaynor playing for Collingwood in 2025

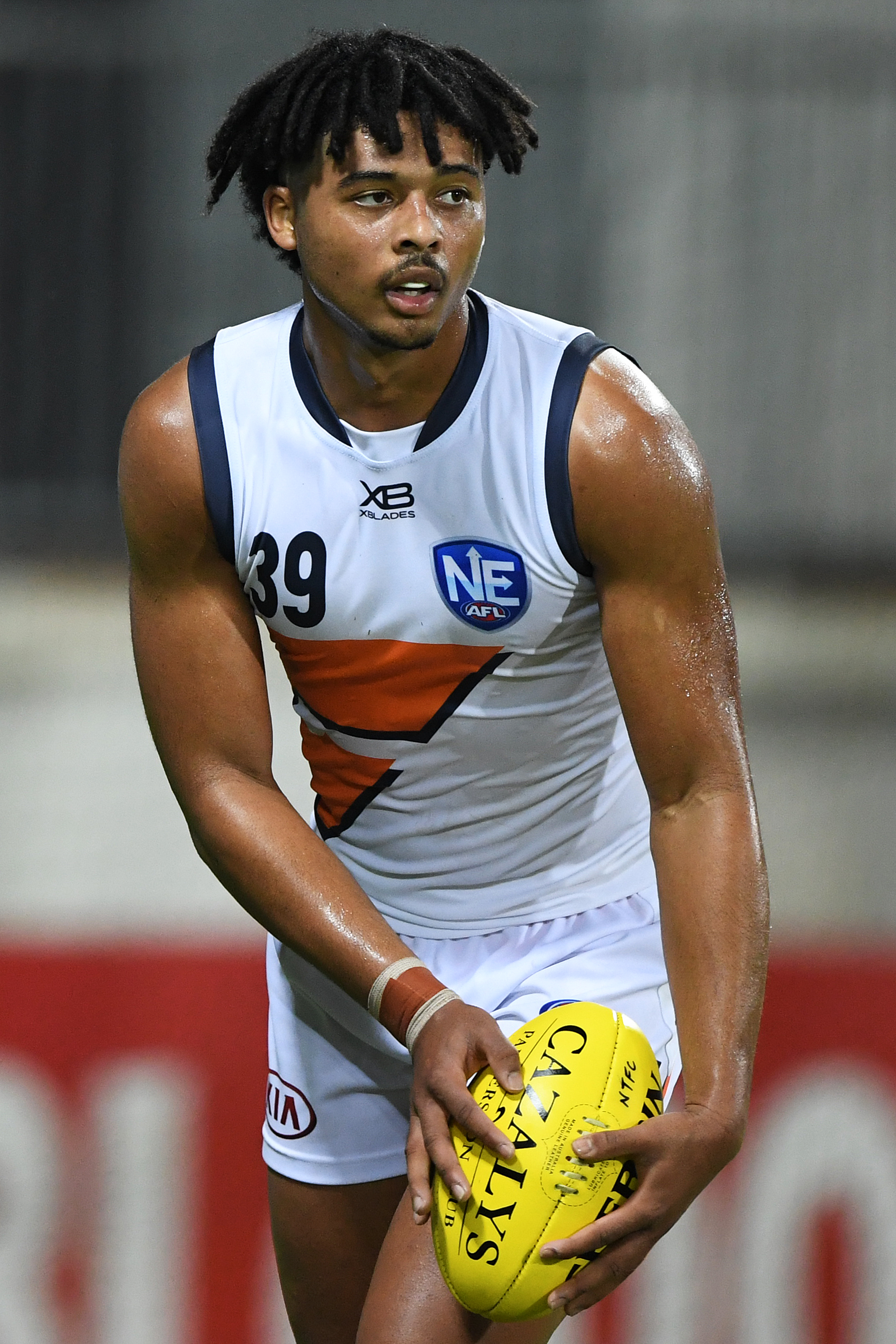
Connor Idun playing for GWS in 2019

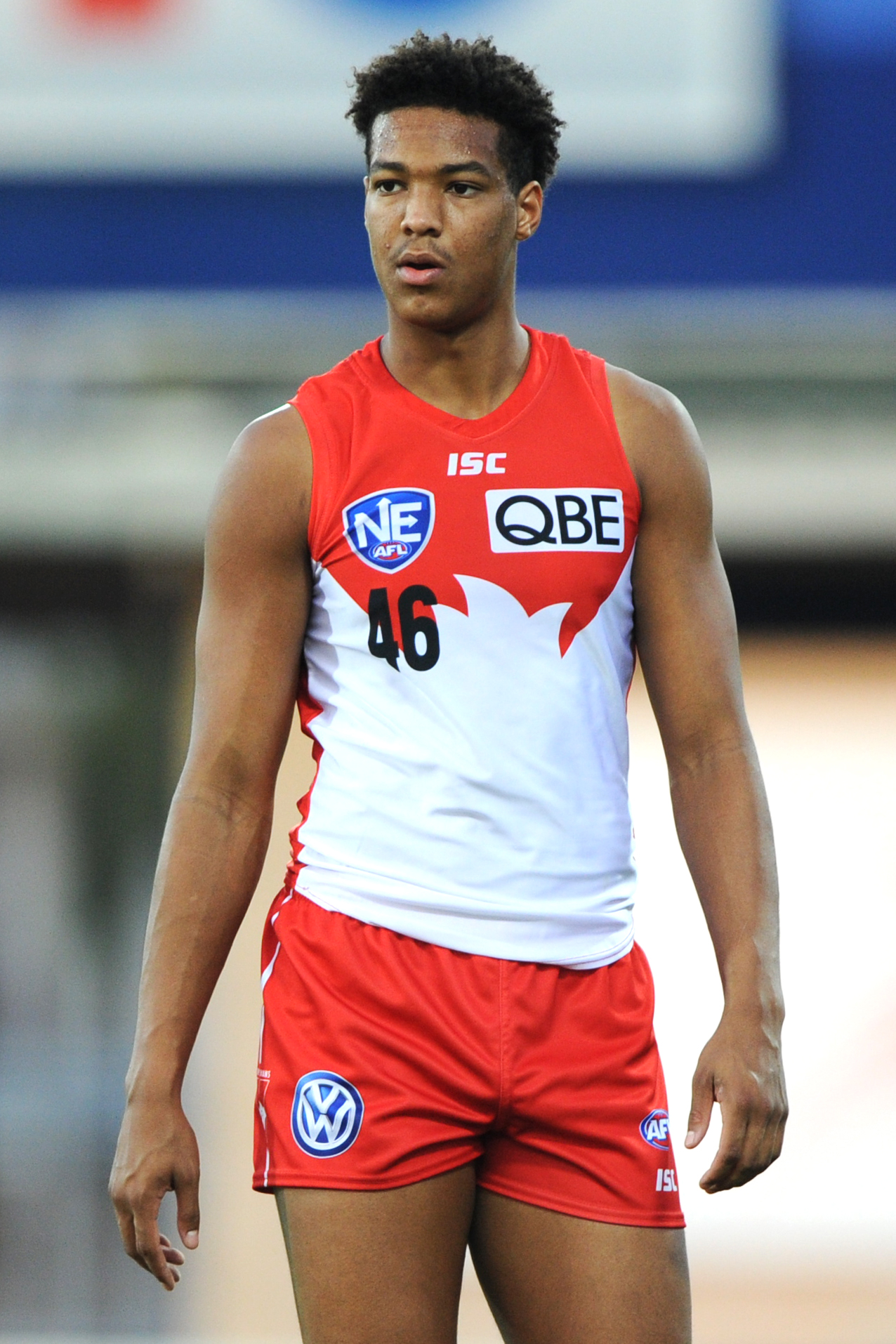
Joel Amartey playing for Sydney in 2018

Player	AFL/AFLW Years*	AFL/AFLW Matches*	AFL/AFLW Goals*	Connections to Ghana, References
Brandon Walker	2021-	37	1	Born
Connor Idun	2019-	39	0	Father
Isaac Quaynor	2019-	71	3	Father
Joel Amartey	2018-	17	16	Father

== Kenya ==
There have been efforts to start the sport at junior level since 2004. Gus Horsey from the Baltimore Washington Eagles from the United States Australian Football League visited the country in February and September, running several footy clinics and organising a grand final between four local teams in Nairobi. During Horsey's second visit to Kenya to coach Australian rules, he regularly trained over 100 children after school with help from local soccer coaches, although plans through USFooty Kids to continue the clinics in the future did not go ahead.

The AFL reported in 2009 that junior clinics were being conducted in Kenya under the same model as FootyWILD in South Africa.

In 2015, schoolboys international matches were held on the Kenya-Tanzania border.

=== Notable players ===
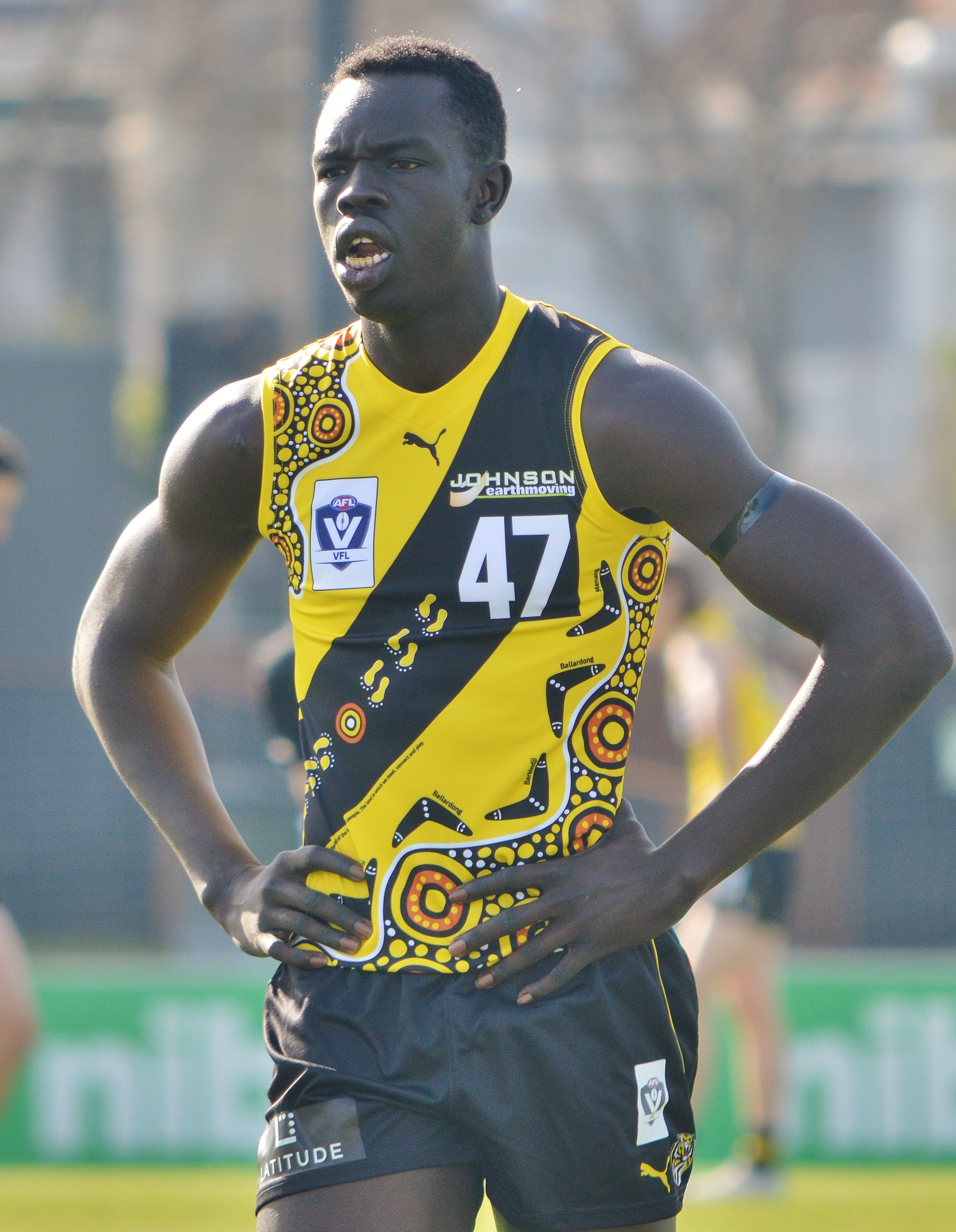
Bigoa Nyuon with Richmond in 2021

Player	AFL/AFLW Years*	AFL/AFLW Matches*	AFL/AFLW Goals*	Connections to Kenya, References
Sebit Kuek	2022-2024	0	0	Born
Elaine Grigg	2024-	3	0	Born
Leek Aleer	2022-	3	0	Born
Bigoa Nyuon	2022-2024	4	0	Born Nairobi
Sophie McDonald	2020-	26	0	Parent
Tony Olango	2017	-	-	Born
Aliir Aliir	2014-	114	5	Born Kakuma

== Malawi ==
Educaring Africa ran clinics Ntakataka Village in Monkey Bay in 2019.

== Nigeria ==
While the sport hasn't been played in Nigeria, some AFL players from the migrant community in Australia have strong connections to the country.

=== Notable players ===
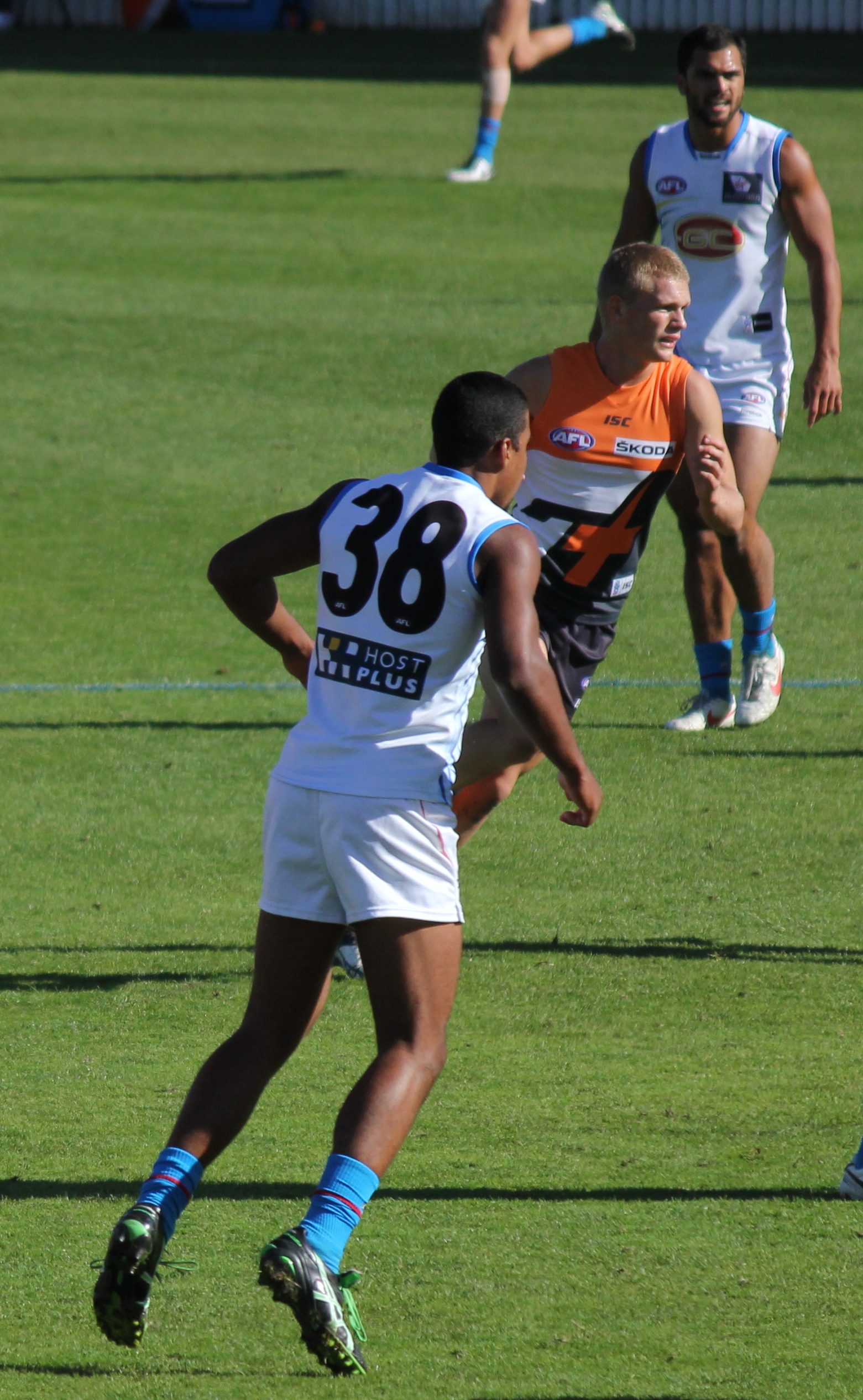
Joel Wilkinson with Gold Coast in 2012

Player	AFL/AFLW Years*	AFL/AFLW Matches*	AFL/AFLW Goals*	Connections to Nigeria, References
Stefan Okunbor	2023-	-	-	Parents
Joel Wilkinson	2011-2013	26	1	Father

== Senegal ==
Australian rules football was played sporadically in Senegal during the 1990s, after Darwin-based Mark Moretti visited Dakar for two months in 1991. Moretti had introduced the sport to local children originally as an example of overseas culture, but there was interest from both the children and some local soccer administrators in continuing the sport. When Moretti returned in 1997 there had not been any progress, so he organised some footballs and other material to be sent to Senegal and the country was represented at the International Australian Football Council AGM in Darwin in 1999. Around this time, two teams were established, named the Crocodiles and the Hares, but the sport has since disappeared in the country.

A team representing Senegal appeared at the "World 9s" in Catalonia in 2008, consisting of Senegalese nationals resident in Spain and competing in the Catalan AFL.

Collingwood FC recruited 202cm Senegalese basketballer Bassirou Faye as an international rookie in 2021.

== South Africa ==
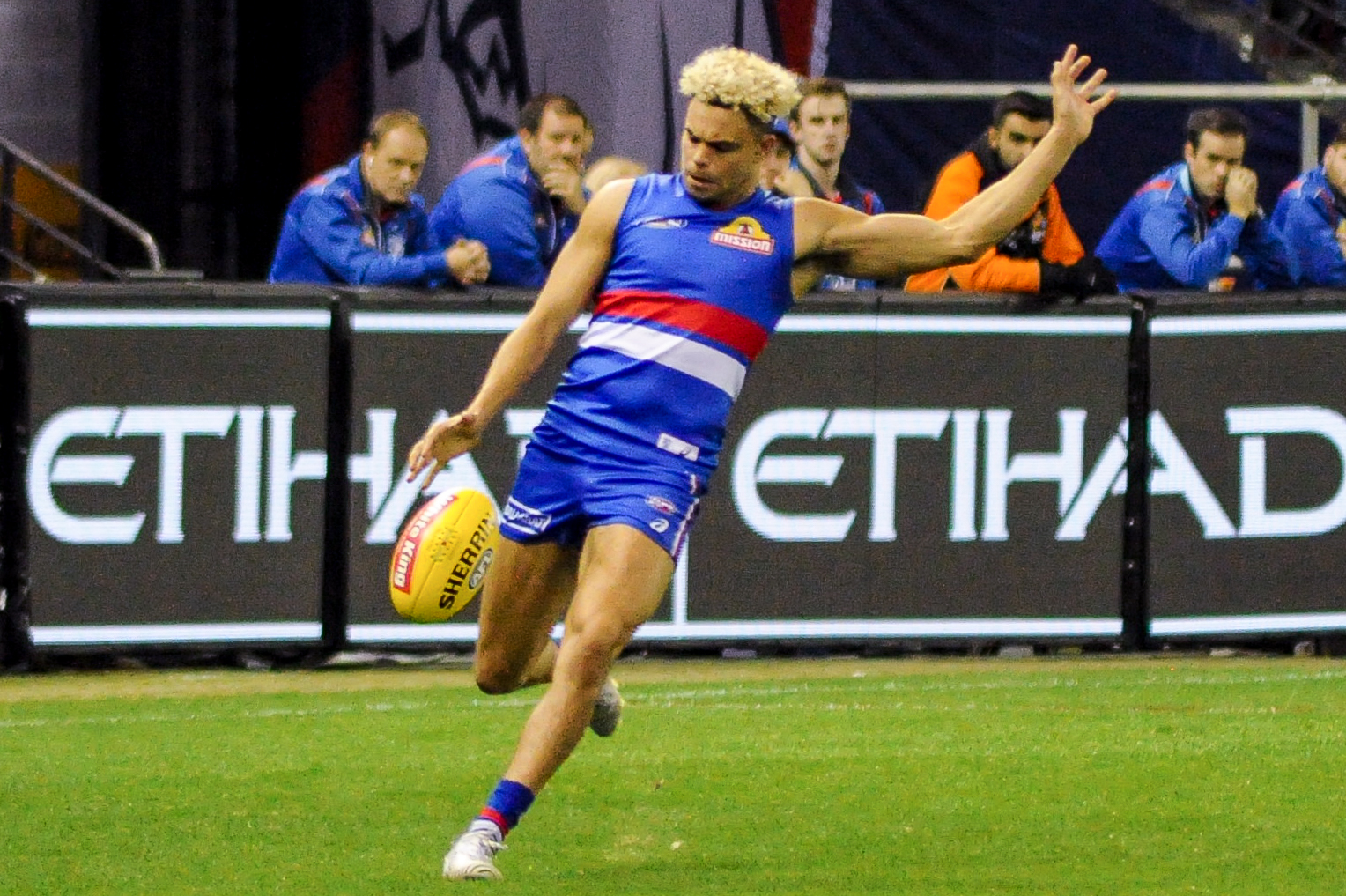
South African premiership player Jason Johannisen playing for the Western Bulldogs in 2017

The Witwatersrand Gold Rush brought miners from Australia to South Africa and records indicate that it was played from the 1880s to 1909 and was for a time during 1904, the most popular football code in the colony. It was reintroduced by the Australian Defence Force in 1997 and in the 2000s became one of the fastest growing places for the sport outside of Australia, becoming widely played in the North West Province with tens of thousands of players. The governing body is AFL South Africa. Prominent South African born AFL players include Damian Cupido and Jason Johannisen.

== Sudan ==
While the sport hasn't been played in Sudan, the country is notable for producing AFL players from the migrant community in Australia.

=== Notable players ===
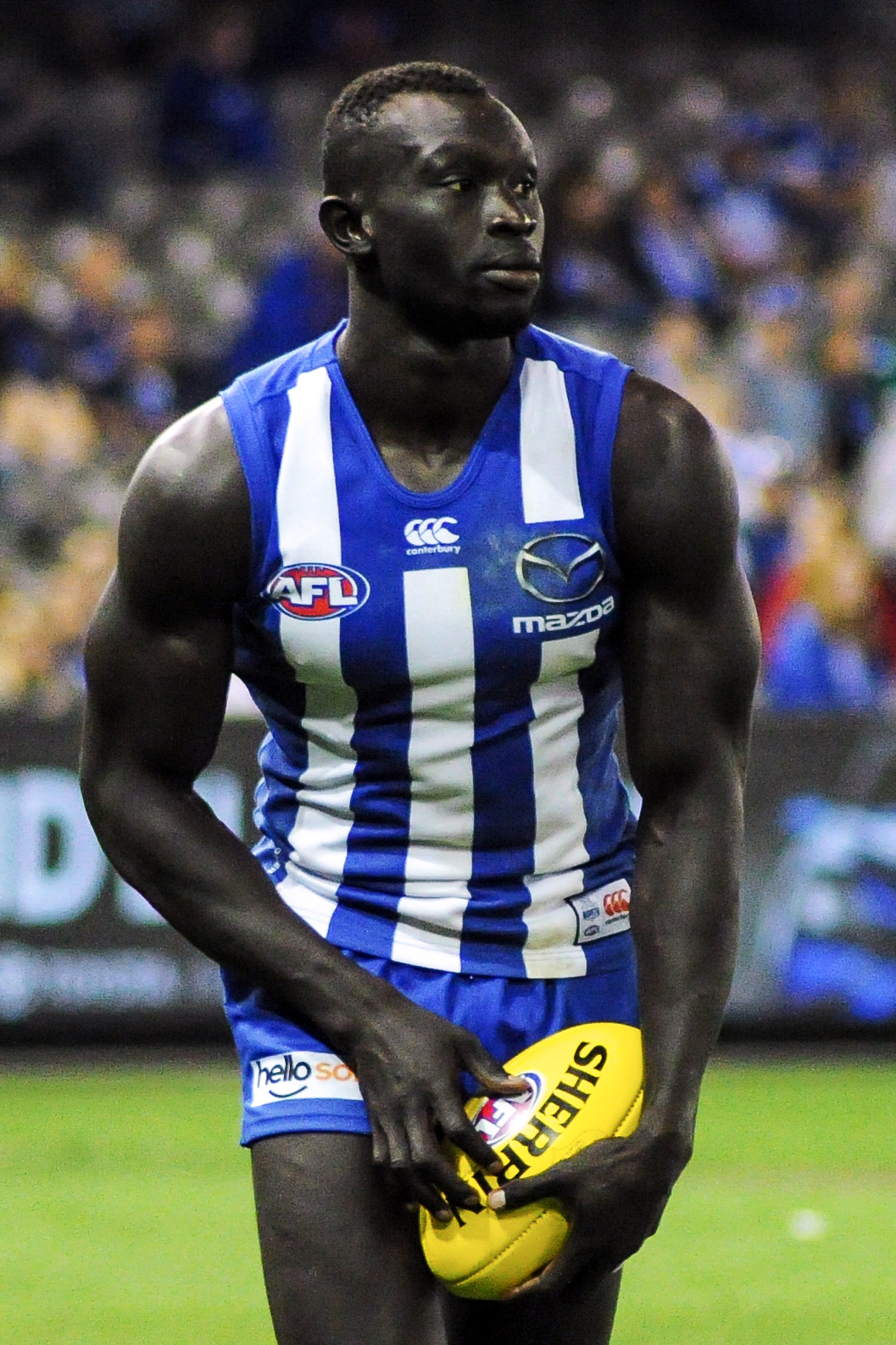
Majak Daw with North Melbourne in 2018

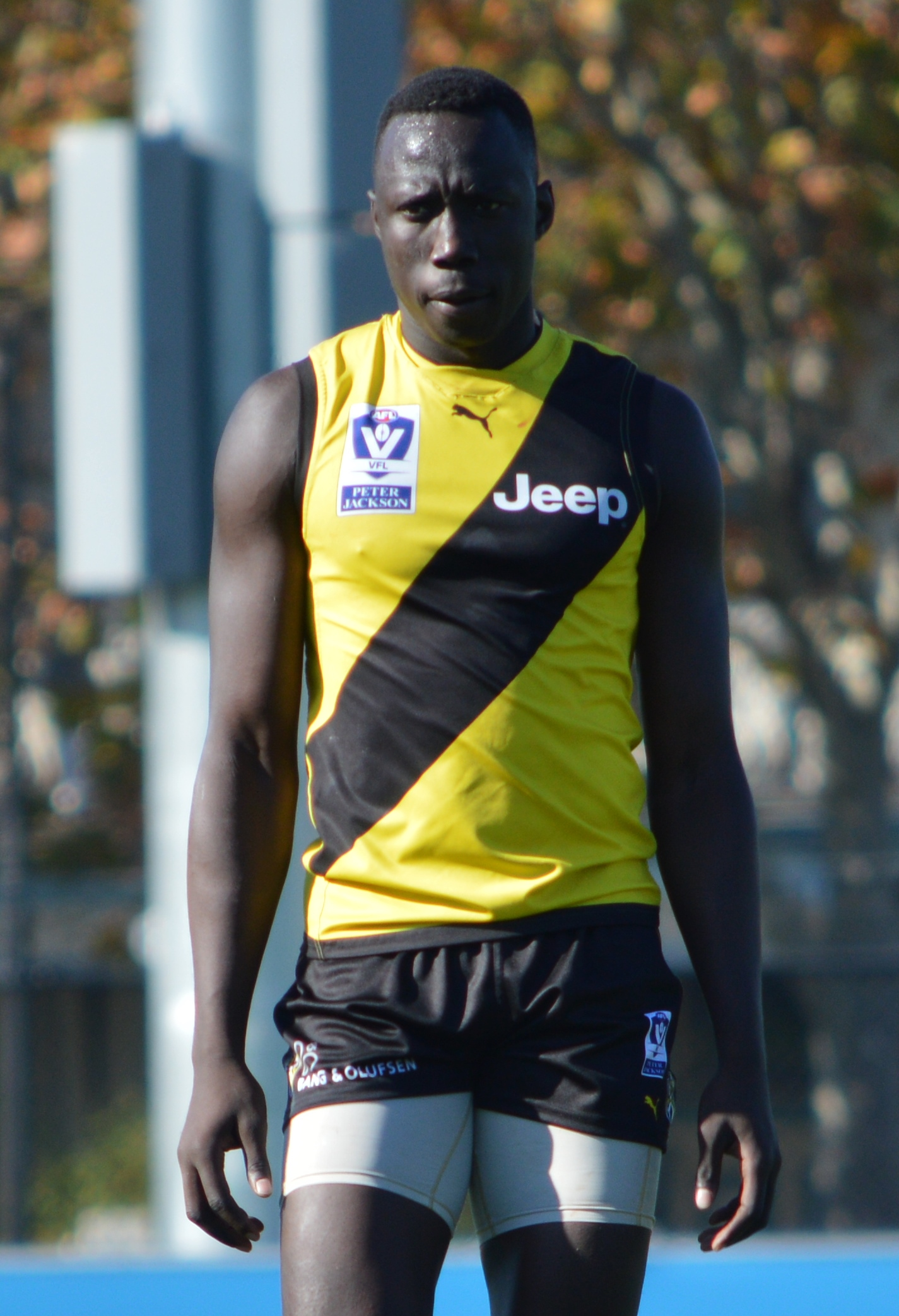
Mabior Chol with Richmond in 2018

Player	AFL/AFLW Years*	AFL/AFLW Matches*	AFL/AFLW Goals*	Connections to Sudan, References
Domanic Akuei	2022-	-	-	Born
Bigoa Nyuon	2022-2024	4	0	Parents
Mac Andrew	2022-	10	0	Parents
Tarir Bayok	2020	-	-	Born
Buku Khamis	2019-	9	6	Born
Tony Olango	2017	-	-	Parents
Majak Daw	2011-2022	54	43	Born Khartoum

== South Sudan ==
While the sport hasn't been played in South Sudan, the country is notable for producing many AFL players from the migrant community in Australia. A team representing South Sudan has won the World 9s twice most recently in 2021.

=== Notable players ===
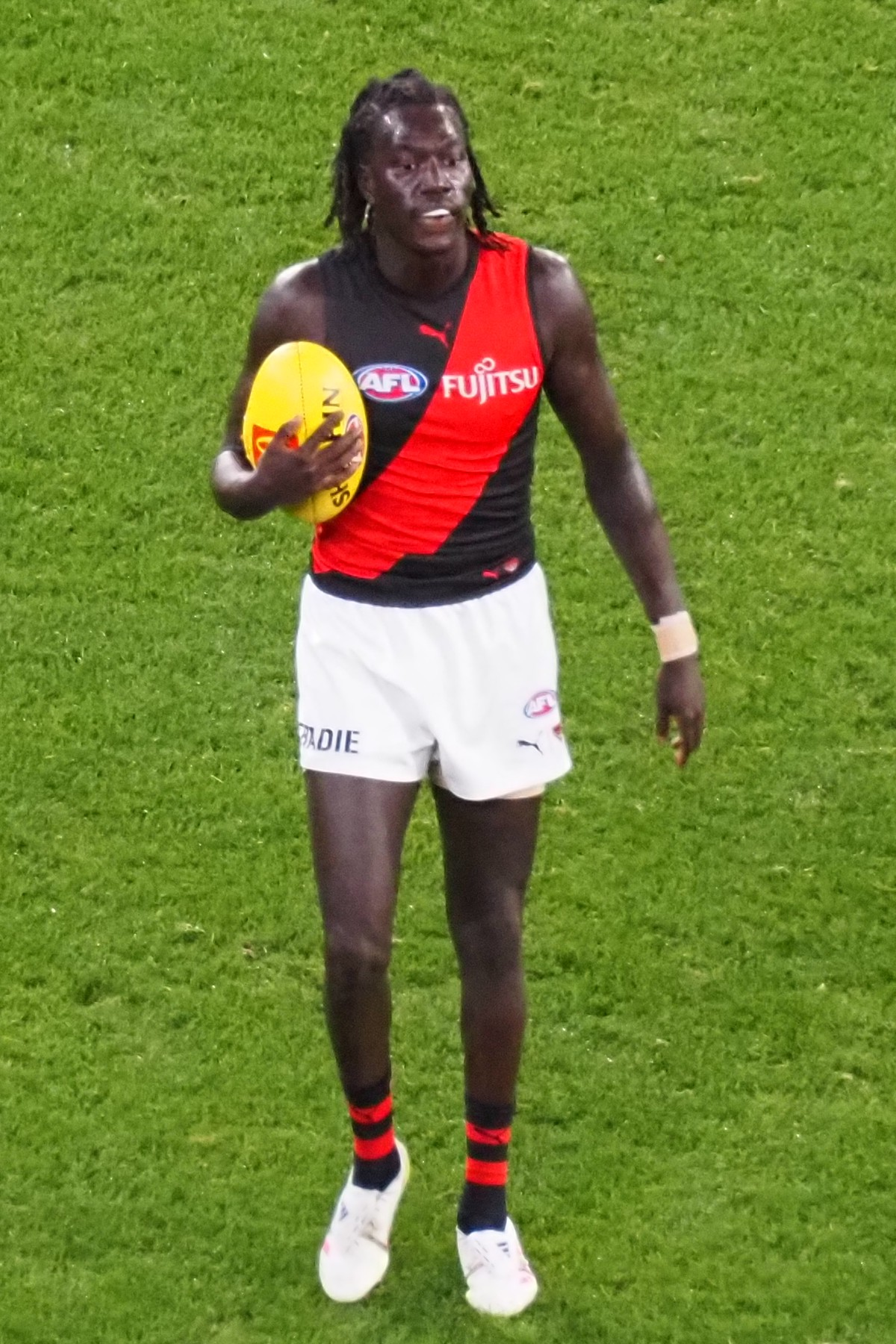
Luamon Lual playing for Essendon in 2025

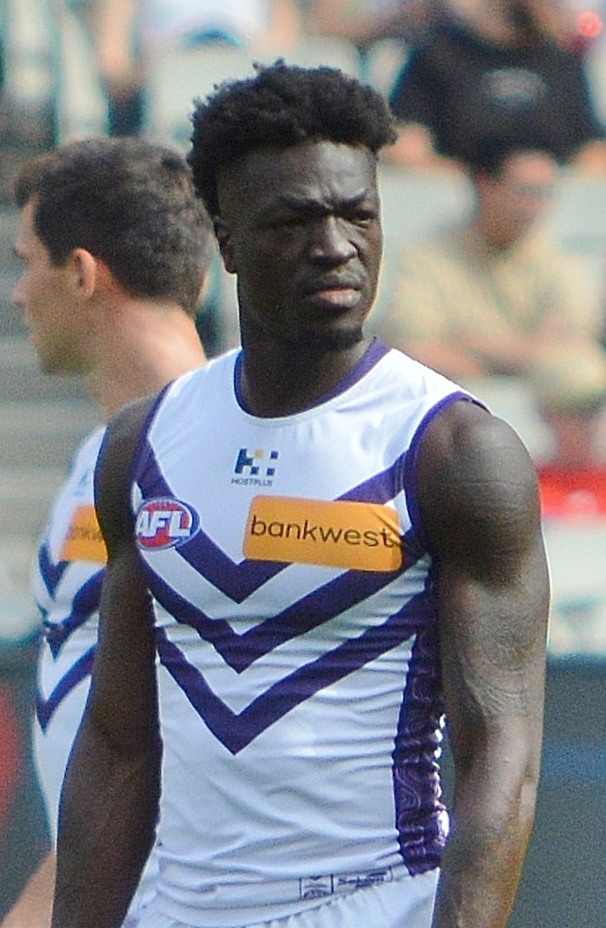
Michael Frederick playing for Fremantle in 2025

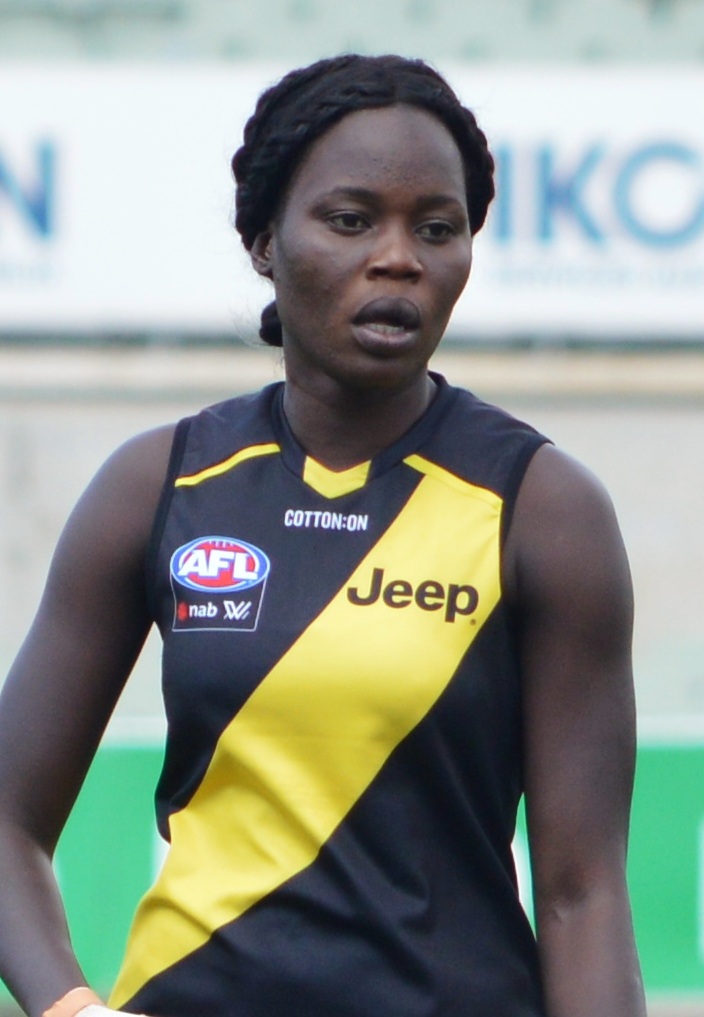
Akec Makur Chuot playing for Richmond in 2020

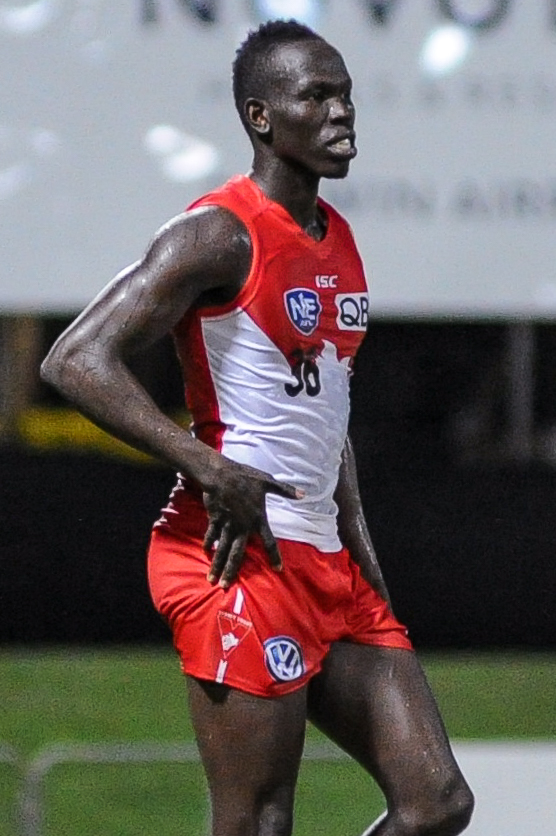
Aliir Aliir playing for Sydney in 2017

Player	AFL/AFLW Years*	AFL/AFLW Matches*	AFL/AFLW Goals*	Connections to South Sudan, References
Luamon Lual	2025-	12	4	Parents
Sebit Kuek	2022-2024	0	0	Born
Tew Jiath	2024-	1	0	Parents
Bigoa Nyuon	2022-2024	4	0	Parents
Mac Andrew	2022-	10	0	Parents
Leek Aleer	2022-	3	0	Parents
Martin Frederick	2021-	14	2	Parents
Michael Frederick	2020-	48	58	Parents
Tom Jok	2019-	1	0	Born Nasir
Changkuoth Jiath	2018-	45	2	Parents
Akec Makur Chuot	2017-	33	2	Born Yirol
Mabior Chol	2016-	56	75	Born
Reuben William	2016-2017	3	0	Born Wau
Gach Nyuon	2016-2017	-	-	Born, parents
Aliir Aliir	2014-	114	5	Parents

== Uganda ==
Non-organised Australian football at junior level featuring locals has been played in Uganda in 2006.

== Western Sahara ==
Australian football was played on an informal basis in Western Sahara in 2008.

== Zimbabwe ==
The sport of Australian rules football was in its early stages of development in Zimbabwe in 2008, with Australian Football Zimbabwe in the planning stage, with its main aims being to combine Aussie rules football as a developing sport, with health clinics and information sessions to be run to assist disadvantaged and sick children.

In 2020, AFL Zimbabwe was formed as the governing body for the sport in Zimbabwe.

=== Notable players ===
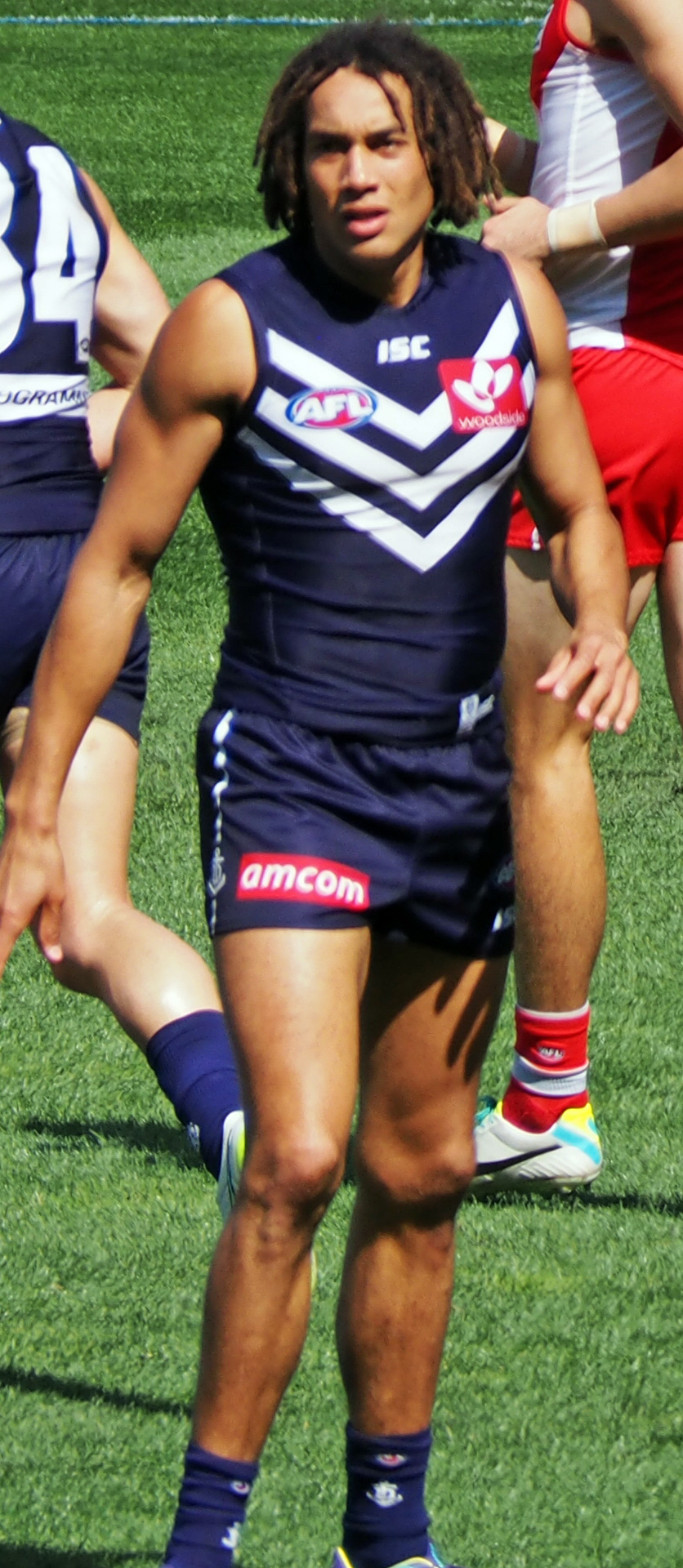
Tendai Mzungu with Fremantle in 2015

Player	AFL/AFLW Years*	AFL/AFLW Matches*	AFL/AFLW Goals*	Connections to Zimbabwe, References
Tendai Mzungu	2011-2017	105	55	Father
Ian Perrie	1998-2007	116	129	Born

== Other AFL nationalities ==
An increasing number of players descended from the Indigenous peoples of Africa have played professionally in the Australian Football League, holding African Australian identity. The successful career of Majak Daw in the AFL is credited as having inspired many children from the South Sudanese migrant community in Australia to take up the sport.

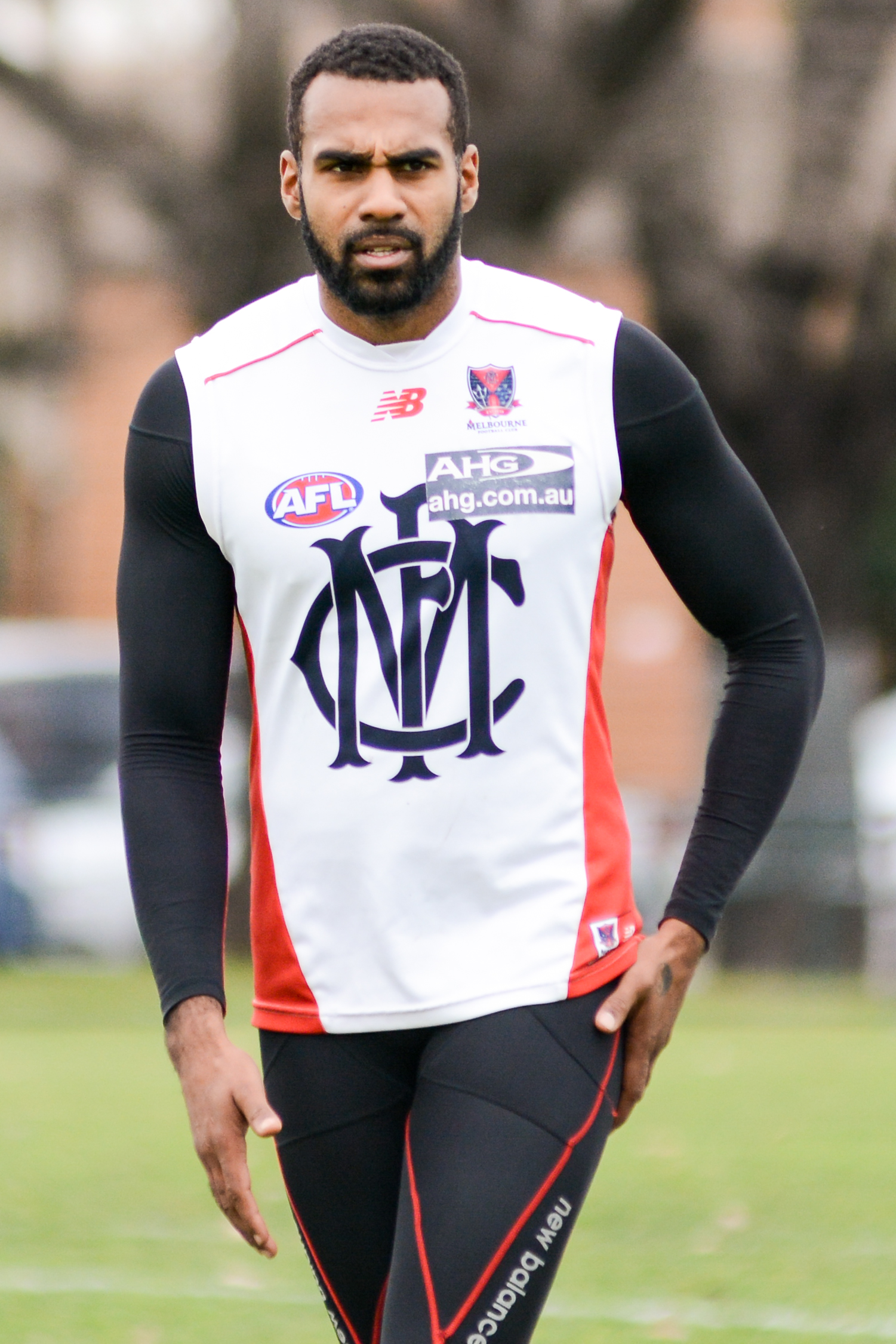
Héritier Lumumba with Melbourne in 2015

Player	AFL/AFLW Years*	AFL/AFLW Matches*	AFL/AFLW Goals*	Connections to Africa, References
Héritier Lumumba	2005-2016	223	30	Congolese-Angolan father

=== Team Africa at the International Cup ===
A team known as Team Africa, drawn from various Melbourne African communities, competed in the 2008 Australian Football International Cup's Multicultural Challenge, playing matches against South Africa, Tonga and an Asian community side dubbed Team Asia.

Team Africa's players were from countries including Somalia, Egypt, Ethiopia, Sudan, Nigeria, Kenya, South Africa, Zimbabwe and Djibouti.
