= Sudanese Americans =

Americans of Sudanese birth or descent

Total population
- 75,413 (2023) (Ancestry); 59,305 (2023) (Sudan–Born)

Regions with significant populations
- New York City, Fort Worth, Boston, Philadelphia, San Antonio, Dallas, Cleveland, Detroit, Chicago, Milwaukee, Des Moines, Kansas City, Baltimore, Alexandria, Washington, D.C., Los Angeles, San Diego, Greensboro, Omaha, Memphis, Phoenix, Atlanta, Miami, Louisville, Minneapolis, Denver, Seattle

Languages
- Arabic; American English; Nubian languages

Religion
- Predominantly: Sunni Islam: Minority: Coptic Orthodox

Sudanese Americans (Arabic: أمريكيون سودانيون) are Americans of Sudanese ancestry or Sudanese who have American citizenship. Sudanese Americans may also include children born in the United States to an American (or to another nationality) parent and a Sudanese parent. Many Sudanese immigrated to the United States in the 1990s as war refugees, escaping from the second civil war. In the 2012 American Community Survey, 48,763 people identified as Sudanese or Sudanese Americans who—or whose ancestors—have emigrated from their native land to the U.S. in the 1980s, 1990s, and 2000s.

== History ==
With the Civil War in Sudan, in 1983, many Sudanese and South Sudanese were settled in refugee camps in other neighboring African countries (Egypt, Ethiopia, Kenya, Uganda.) Since 1990, Sudanese refugees in these camps have been accepted to the United States. As such, most Sudanese refugees came to the United States after 1991, although most them hailed from South Sudan (who arrived in this country, basically, from 2001, although also were established there some Sudanese refugee communities from northern Sudan). So, many northern Sudanese settled in places such as Maine (where Darfurian people first arrived in 1993 in cities such as Portland; also, Lewiston) or Omaha, Nebraska (which had built a Sudanese community by 1997.)

== Demography ==
According to the 2000 Census, the largest Sudanese communities (the 2000 U.S. census did not distinguish between Northern and Southern Sudanese as South Sudan was not yet an independent nation) were located in New York City; Detroit; Des Moines, Iowa; Alexandria, Virginia; Los Angeles; and San Diego. Sudanese and South Sudanese American communities are also found in other cities such as Greensboro, North Carolina; Dallas, TX; Flint, MI; the Washington metropolitan area and many other cities. Virginia, Washington, Maryland, California, Idaho, Minnesota, and North Carolina have the largest Sudanese populations in the United States.

Since at least 1997, many Sudanese and South Sudanese have lived in Omaha, Nebraska. There are ten Sudanese and South Sudanese tribes, among which are the Northern Sudanese Maban people. According to the UNO School of Social Work, Sudanese from the Nuba Mountains and Darfur among other places have settled in Omaha. Seventeen tribes (with around 2,000 Sudanese and South Sudanese [esp. the South Sudanese Acholi tribe]) have also settled in Maine. Maine is, indeed, the state with the largest group of resettled Darfurians in the United States.

Several Sudanese ethnic groups are represented in the United States, including the Maban and Fur people.

Political dissidents in Northern Sudan emigrated, fleeing from the oppressive Muslim fundamentalist regime in Khartoum. Many of them migrated to refugee camps in neighboring countries, particularly Ethiopia, to escape forced conscription or, to a lesser extent, religious persecution directed specifically against followers of the Baháʼí Faith. From these camps, many were accepted to the United States. Sudanese or South Sudanese immigrated to the U.S. from different regions of Sudan due to political disagreements, educational and vocational opportunities or for family reunification, as well.

According to estimates for 2015 to 2019 from The Migration Policy Institute, 46,700 Sudanese immigrants lived in the U.S. The top six counties of settlement were as follows:

Rank	County	State	Population
1	Fairfax County	Virginia	2,500
2	Guilford County	North Carolina	1,300
3	Tarrant County	Texas	1,100
4	Maricopa County	Arizona	1,100
5	Douglas County	Nebraska	1,100
6	Dallas County	Texas	1,100

In 2023, the Top 10 cities with the most residents reporting Sudanese ancestry or origin were as follows:

City	State	Sudanese Population	City's Population	Sudanese Percentage
Omaha	Nebraska	2,858	488,059	0.586%
Des Moines	Iowa	2,552	213,545	1.195%
Nashville	Tennessee	2,412	682,646	0.353%
New York	New York	1,804	8,736,047	0.021%
Arlington	Texas	1,714	392,304	0.437%
Iowa City	Iowa	1,529	74,240	2.059%
Greensboro	North Carolina	1,309	295,483	0.443%
Rochester	Minnesota	1,077	119,732	0.899%
Anchorage	Alaska	974	292,545	0.333%
Glendale Heights	Illinois	907	33,443	2.712%

== Health care ==
Most Sudanese that have established themselves in the U.S. face numerous difficulties in accessing health care, although in varying degrees depending on factors such as educational level and having obtained medical care in Sudan. Among the linguistic and educational differences are added factors such as the discrepancy of name and date of birth, and a general lack of prior medical documentation, causing confusion in the American health system.

With no prior care or checkups in Sudan, immigrants from this country are found with medical conditions previously unknown to them. Many Sudanese have diabetes, hypertension, food allergies, severe cases of depression, loss of vision and hearing, parasitism, and dental problems, although it's feeding change in the U.S.

In addition, Sudanese Americans often stop taking their medication when symptoms resolve, which often contradicts doctors' recommendations.

== Organizations ==
Sudanese Americans (whether from North or South Sudan) created several associations. In 1999, due to linguistic or educational barriers, a Sudanese group from Rochester, Minnesota, founded the New Sudan-American Hope (NSAH) to help Sudanese refugees in the resettlement process. Almost a decade later and with members from diverse backgrounds, NSAH still helps refugees in Rochester and has also informed others of the effects of civil war in Sudan.

== Notable people ==
- Amrou Fudl, known online as Myron Gaines, co-host of the Fresh and Fit Podcast
- Nawal M. Nour, gynecologist
- Abdullahi Ahmed An-Na'im, professor
- Elfatih Eltahir, Professor of Hydrology and Climate at the Massachusetts Institute of Technology MIT
- Mohammed Adam El-Sheikh, imam
- Oddisee, musician
- Safia Elhillo, poet
- Bas, born in Paris to Sudanese parents
- Dua Saleh, singer
- Girmay Zahilay, American politician born in Sudan to Ethiopian parents
- Aya Osman, assistant professor at the Icahn School of Medicine in New York City

== See also ==
- Sudanese Australians
- Sudanese British
- Sudan–United States relations
