= African Australian identity =

Cultural identity of Australians with African ancestry

African Australian identity is the objective or subjective state of perceiving oneself as an African Australian and as relating to being African Australian. As a group identity, African Australian can denote pan-African ethnic identity, as well as a diasporic identity in relation to the perception of Africa as a homeland. This has been shown to be based on both a cultural association with Africa and blood-ancestry.

== Background ==
In 2011, chaired by Maria Vamvakinou, the Joint Standing Committee on Migration discussed the topic in relation to multiculturalism in Australia. An analysis of Australian journalism in 2014 highlighted the use of generalising and discriminatory descriptions in media, such as "Sudanese gangs" and "Black Africans", to attribute "a homogeneous African-Australian identity" to people of African descent living in Melbourne.

In 2017, two female students of South Sudanese heritage attending Bentleigh Secondary College were reported to have been discriminated against for being asked to remove their hair braids. According The Age, the students believed the school was "attacking their African culture" and "identity". Within the same school year, a similar incident occurred in Mildura, Victoria after a student of Nigerian ancestry, reported to wear "dreadlocks to express his West African roots", was suspended from St Joseph's College for his refusal to remove them.

In 2018, Australian Football League players of African descent released a joint press-statement encouraging African Australians to "be proud of your African identity". The AFL players, including Majak Daw, Aliir Aliir, Mabior Chol and Changkuoth Jiath, stressed that racial tensions in Victoria, Australia must not be allowed "to define everyone of African descent" in Australia. Later that month, ABC's Talkfest podcast series discussed African Australian identity with four academics from the Wheeler Centre. The following year, another ABC piece detailed a former SBS World News employee's experience of work-place discrimination when asked to remove her braided hairstyle. As a style specifically worn to express her "African identity", and as the only "Black African" being asked to make appearance-based changes, the request was perceived as an "attack" on her identity and "African culture".

Specialising in intercultural parenting, Southern Cross University lecturer Dharam Bhugun has demonstrated Australian parents of African heritage ascribing and encouraging an African Australian identity onto their children. Published in 2020, the research indicated that this was based both on their "cultural association with Africa" and a descent-based concept of "African blood".

== Categories ==
African Australian identity can contain interconnecting subsections, some of which may constitute an individual's self-identification, such as:

1. African Australian peoplehood, a sense of African Australians as a distinct ethnic group;
2. African Australian culture, which may include aspects such as fashion and dressing customs, such as braided or dreadlock hairstyle. which despite causing suspensions and threats of exclusion at several national schools, have been reported in Australian media as having up to a 3600-year-old connection to African culture.

== Academic research ==
Referencing social psychologist Gabriel Horenczyk's 2000 study Cultural identity and immigration, a 2011 Murdoch University research repository study, noted the intersection between the "African cultural memory" of diaspora and a sense of African Australian identity in the context of biculturalism.

Research from Victoria University, Melbourne in 2015 demonstrated how African Australian identity was perceived as being closely linked to racial profiling and unjust lack of employment opportunity in Australia. The majority of focus group participants had arrived in Australia as refugees from Eritrea, Ethiopia and Sudan. A further 2018 study at Victoria University also examined the distinct national linguistic and cultural aspects to various African nationalities, diaspora and their descendants in Australia, in relation to a broader African Australian sense of self.

In research conducted at La Trobe University in 2018, participants demonstrated an internal self-identification conflict between relating to being African Australian versus nationally focused identities, such as Ethiopian Australian. Australian National University academic, and Dickson College associate, Dr Kirk Zwangobani has been noted for his exploration of the emergence of African Australian identity in multiple research studies. Zwangobani has outlined what he sees as a difficulty in the identity of "African Australianness", in that African migration to Australia is relatively recent in comparison with British and American history.

== See also ==
- Australian Aboriginal identity
- Cultural identity
- Ethnic identity development
- Ethnogenesis
- Group identity
- Identity (social science)
- Identity formation
- Identity politics
- Self-concept
- Social identity
