= Sudanese in the United Kingdom =

Sudanese diaspora in the UK

Total population
- Sudanese-born residents England: 35,537 (2021 census); Wales: 1,856 (2021 census); Northern Ireland: 751 (2021 census); Scotland: 2,614 (2022 census)

Regions with significant populations
- Greater London, Brighton, West Midlands

Languages
- Arabic, Sudanese Arabic, British English

Religion
- Predominantly: Islam (Sunni) Minority: Christianity (Coptic)

Related ethnic groups
- Sudanese Australians, Sudanese Americans,

Sudanese in the United Kingdom (also British Sudanese) including Sudanese-born immigrants to the UK and their British-born descendants are an extremely diverse national group, especially in terms of political and religious views. It is thought that the UK is home to the oldest Sudanese diaspora in the Western World, as well as one of the largest. Sudanese migrants to the UK have traditionally included professionals, business people and academics, and more recently have included asylum seekers fleeing Sudan's second civil war. Sudanese people live in many of the UK's largest cities and towns.

== History and settlement ==
Sudanese granted asylum or exceptional leave in the UK by year
	Granted	Refused
1989	45	5
1990	15	5
1991	15	10
1992	265	125
1993	1,400	75
1994	50	145
1995	15	60
1996	65	95
1997	75	205
1998	55	65
1999	45	50
2000	180	395
2001	175	595
2002	110	455
2003	155	595
2004	160	1,305
2005	90	900
2006	70	510
2007	80	305

The Sudanese community in the UK is most likely the oldest in the developed world. Despite two civil wars and the war in Darfur, which decimated the Sudanese population by several million, the earliest immigrants from Sudan to the UK were not asylum seekers, but mostly professionals, business people and academics. This migration trend lasted until the late 1980s when the Sudanese government was ousted by a military coup led by Omar al-Bashir, who soon claimed presidency over Sudan.

The nature of Sudanese migration to the UK changed dramatically and has continued through to the 21st century, when several violent struggles between the Janjaweed militia and numerous rebel groups displaced millions of people, and despite an improving economy in Sudan there remains considerable civil and political unrest in the North African nation. Thousands of these displaced persons ultimately fled to the UK, amongst other countries, and claimed asylum.

Asylum applications from Sudan peaked in 1993 and again in 2004. The majority of applications in the early 1990s were accepted, with applicants either granted asylum or exceptional leave to remain, but since 1994, the majority of applications have been refused (see table).

== Demographics ==
=== Population size ===
According to the 2001 UK Census, a total of 10,671 people born in Sudan were living in the UK. This figure is the fifteenth highest migrant population in the UK of all African nations and fifth out of all Arab nations. The only OECD state with more Sudanese-born residents is the United States. A 2006 estimate by the International Organization for Migration suggests that between 10,000 and 25,000 Sudanese are living in London, and anywhere between 3,000 and 18,000 in Brighton. Some 4,000 to 5,000 Sudanese reside in Birmingham and the wider West Midlands region, and the Scottish cities of Glasgow and Edinburgh are home to just over 1,000 Sudanese people each. There are also significant numbers of Sudanese dispersed across the UK in cities and towns including Dundee, Aberdeen, Cardiff, Leeds, Portsmouth, Newport, Bristol, Newcastle upon Tyne, Stoke on Trent, Leicester, Sheffield, Derby, Southampton and Nottingham.

According to the 2011 UK Census, a total of 18,381 people born in Sudan were living in the UK: 16,578 in England, 889 in Wales, 749 in Scotland and 165 in Northern Ireland.

The National Association of British Arabs (NABA) categorises Sudan-born immigrants as Arabs. Based on the 2011 census data, NABA indicates that they are the eighth largest population of British Arabs by country of birth.

In the 2021 UK census, 35,537 people in England were recorded as having been born in Sudan, as well as 1,856 in Wales, and 751 in Northern Ireland. The census in Scotland was delayed by a year until 2022 and recorded 2,614 residents born in Sudan.

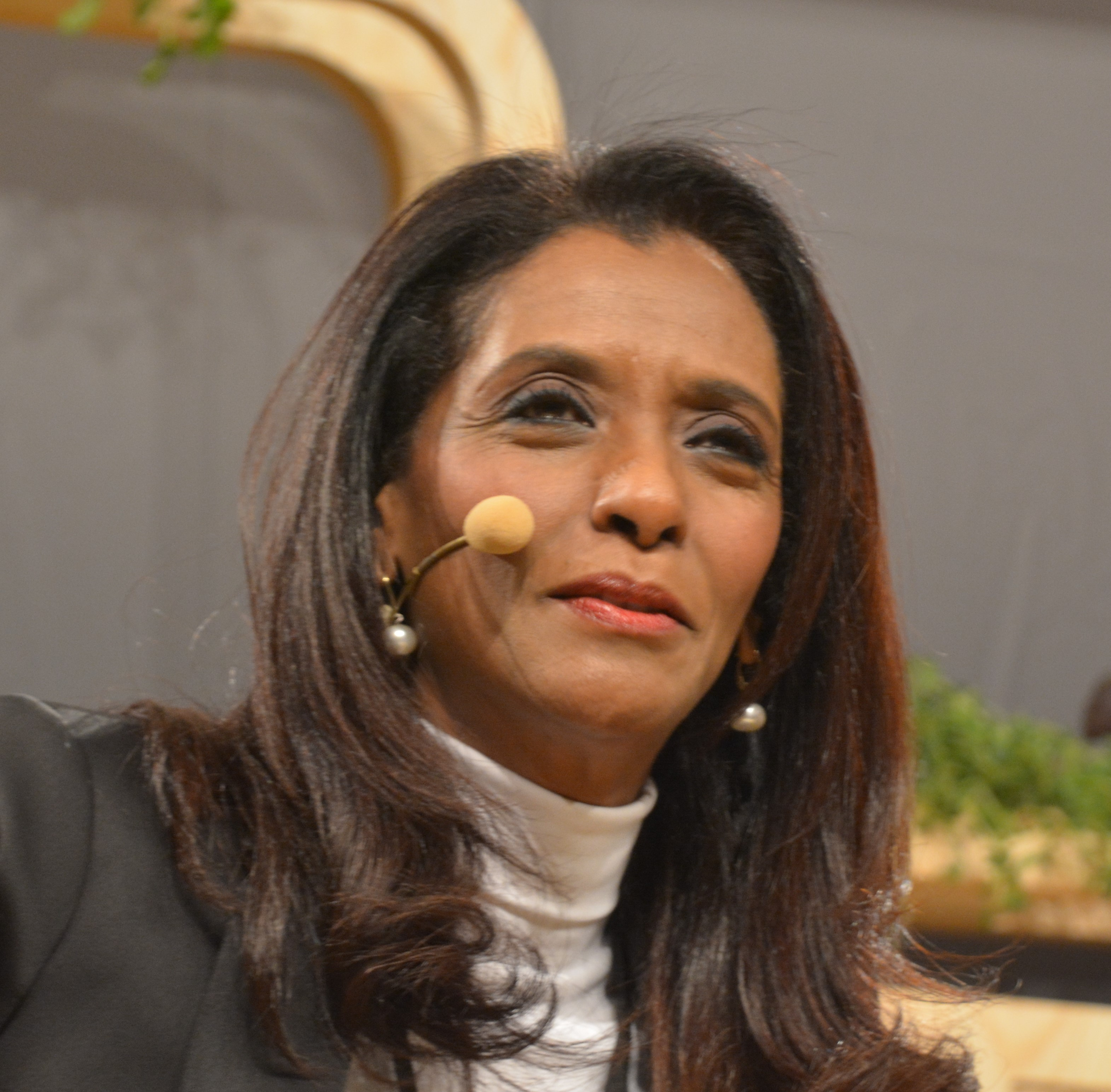
Zeinab Badawi at Nobel Week Dialogue in Stockholm 2016.

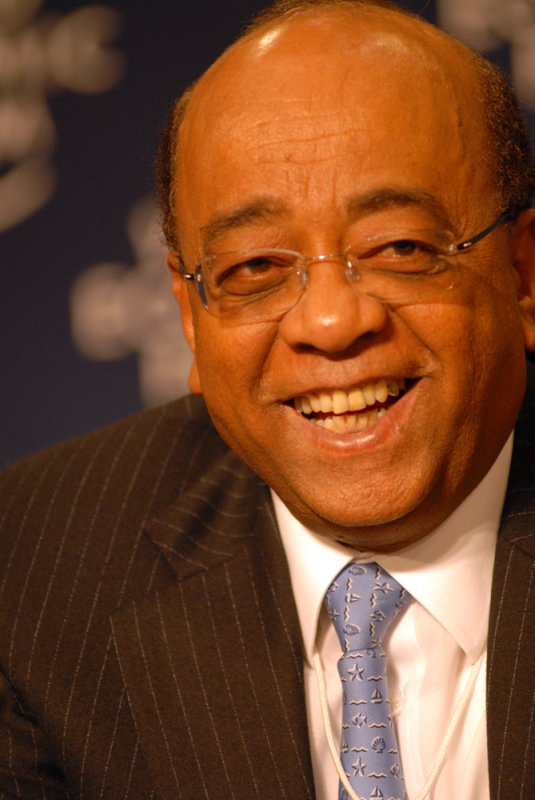
Mo Ibrahim, Sudanese-born British entrepreneur and billionaire at the 2007 World Economic Forum on Africa in Cape Town.

== Notable British-Sudanese or Sudanese residing in the United Kingdom ==
- Javid Abdelmoneim: physician who previously worked with Médecins Sans Frontières and television presenter for Al Jazeera and guest host on BBC's Panorama programme.
- Alexander Siddig: (or Siddig El Fadil) actor known for his role in Syriana, Kingdom of Heaven, and Gotham
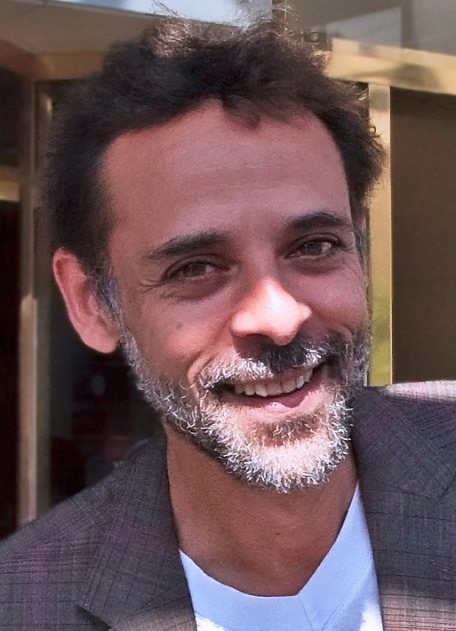
  Alexander Siddig at the 2009 Toronto International Film Festival.
- Amir Wilson: actor known for his roles as Will Parry in the BBC series His Dark Materials and Tiuri in the Netflix series Letter to the King.
- Fatima Ahmed Ibrahim: activist who resided in London. Founder of the ‘Sudanese Women Union’ and later a Sudanese parliamentarian
- Leila Aboulela: award-winning writer and novelist. Her story collection Elsewhere, Home was the winner of the 2018 Saltire Fiction Book of the Year Award
- Mo Abbaro: (Mo Abdalla) ceramicist and potter
- Mo Ibrahim: (Mohammed Ibrahim) telecom businessman. He was among Forbes 2011 billionaire list and the TIME "Top 100" list in 2008
- Nima Elbagir: award-winning senior international correspondent for CNN based in London
- Nesrine Malik: opinion columnist at The Guardian
- Zeinab Badawi: Journalist in BBC world (previously ITV and Channel 4 News)

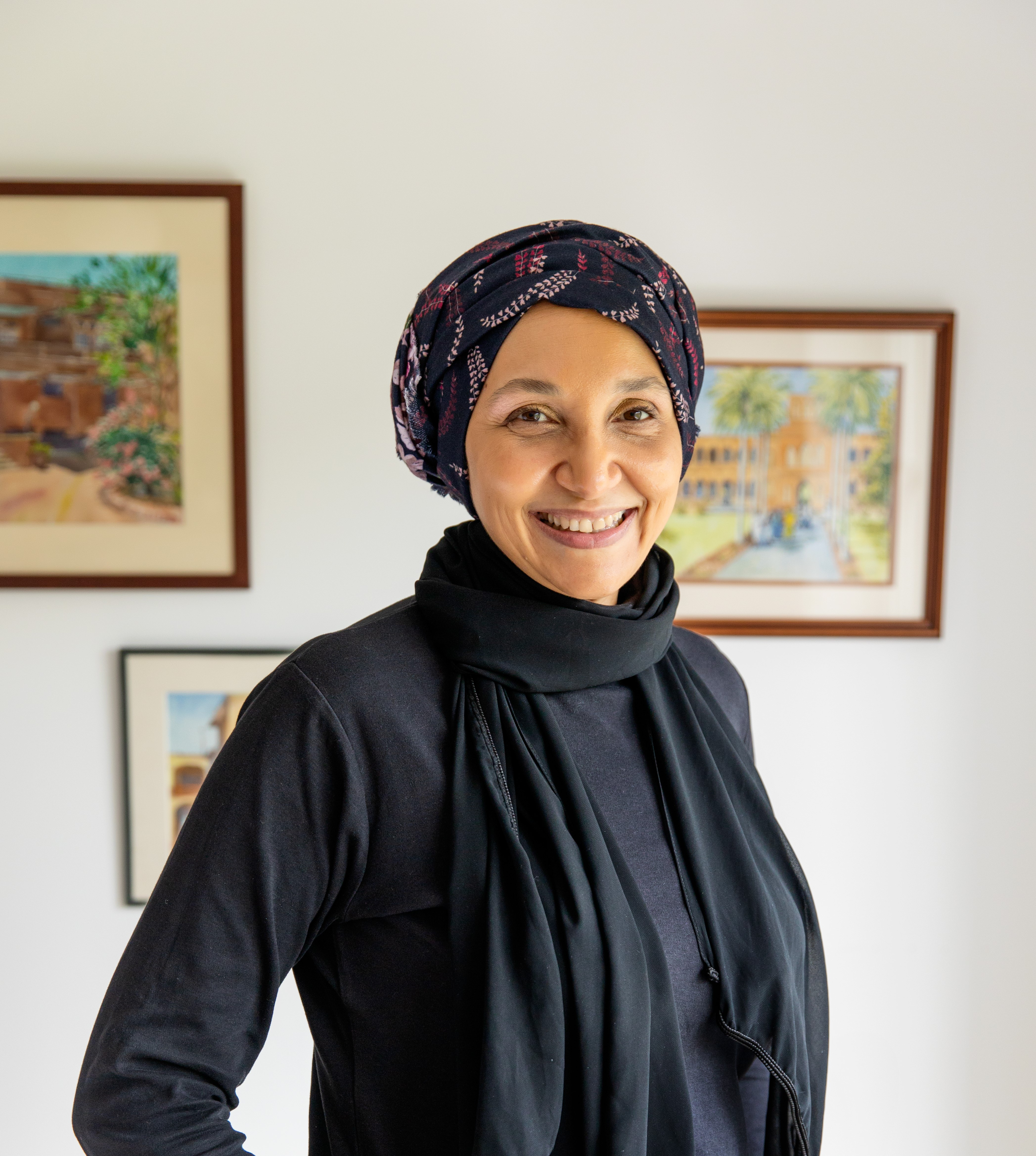
Leila Aboulela, award-winning Sudanese writer who writes in English and lives in Scotland.

- Jamal Mahjoub: prolific writer and novelist, known for his crime fiction novels. His characters and storylines incorporates both Sudanese and British cultures, which mirrors parts of Mahjoub's life living between England and Sudan.
- Ben Bland Known as Ben Boulos, Sudanese Egyptian Jewish descendant, well known business journalist with BBC News and currently anchoring CNBC's "Squawk Box Europe".
- Omeima Mudawi-Rowlings MBE, deaf textile artist based in Brighton who is known for services to people with disabilities in the arts.
- Hamza Yassin: Presenter and wildlife cameraman known for his character "Ranger Hamza" on the CBeebies children's television shows Animal Park and Countryfile.

Ahmed Diraige: the former governor of Darfur Province and current head of the National Redemption Front alliance, based in London since mid 1980s.

== Culture and community ==
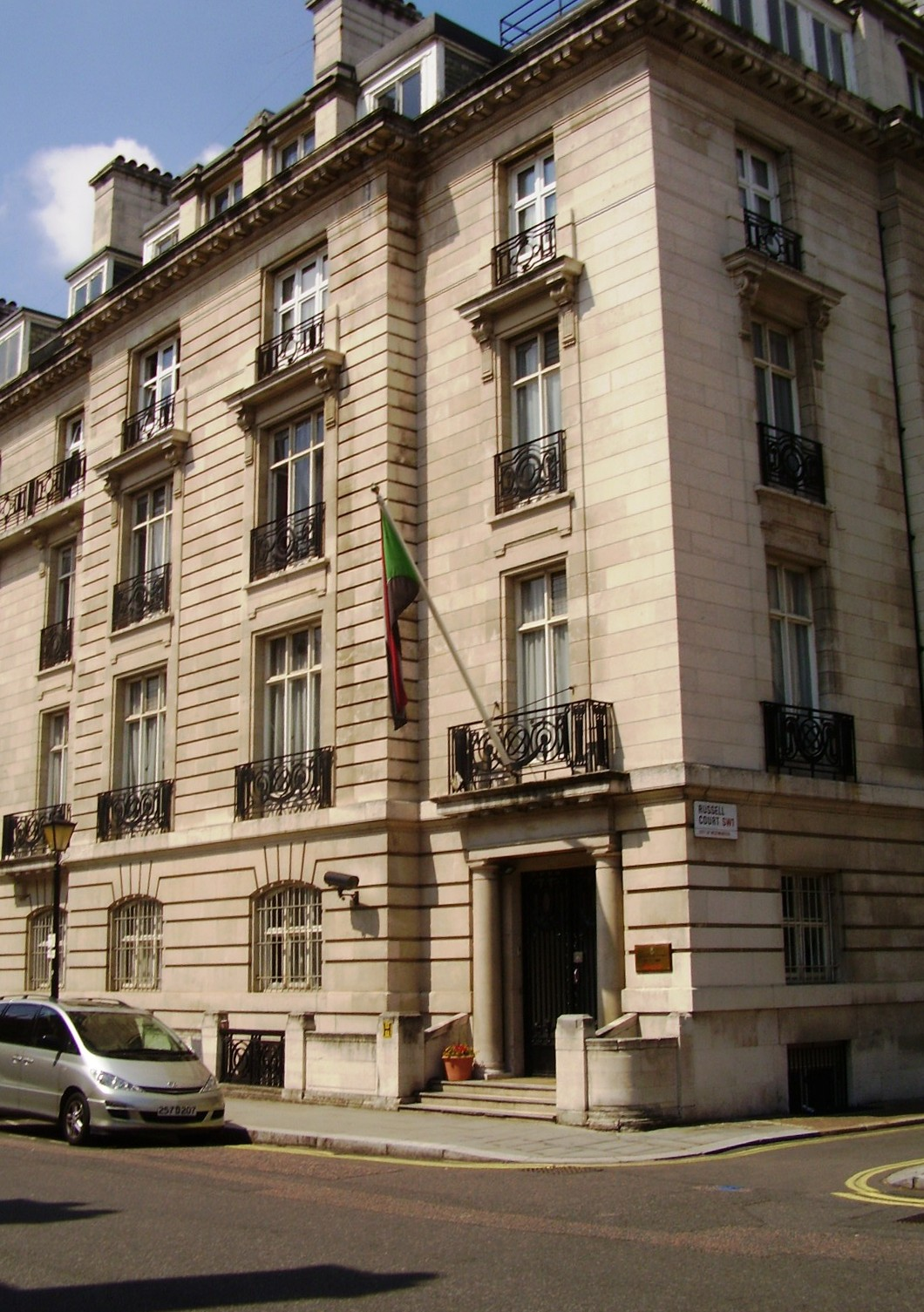
The Embassy of Sudan in London

Numerous community groups and organisations have been established across the UK that cater for the country's Sudanese community, from political organisations and trade unions to refugee organisations and other social and community groups. Some groups conform to and are generally based around Sudanese political parties and professional bodies such as the Umma Party and the Sudanese Doctors' Union. The Sudan Human Rights Organisation and the Sudan Organisation Against Torture are two national non-political organisations that have been set up by Sudanese in exile in the UK, and there are also refugee groups that have been set up across the UK to help new immigrants and asylum seekers to adapt to the British lifestyle and help with any other problems and issues. Besides these bodies and entities, there are a number of less informal social and culture groups that have been set up by Sudanese in the UK (examples of these are the Sudanese Family in Oxfordshire, Leeds Sudanese Community Association, and the Sudanese Coptic Association). Sudanese nationals in the UK are represented by the Embassy of Sudan on Cleveland Row, London, England.

== Further associations ==
- Sudanese Community and Information Centre (SCIC)
- Manchester Sudanese Tree Development Community (MSTDC)
- South Sudan Women’s Skills Development (SSWSD)
- Sudanese Nubian Association UK (SNAUK)
- Sudanese Doctors Union UK (SDU-UK)

== See also ==
- Sudan–United Kingdom relations
- Demography of Sudan
- Sudanese American
- Sudanese Australian
