= Omeima Mudawi-Rowlings =

Deaf British-Sudanese textile artist (born 1969)

Omeima Mudawi-Rowlings MBE
- أميمة مضوي
- Born: Omeima Osman Khalid Mudawi (Arabic: أميمة عثمان خالد مضوي; April 1969 (age 56–57); Sudan
- Citizenship: United Kingdom; Sudan
- Education: Surrey Institute of Art & Design, University College (BA, 1998) Birkbeck, University of London (MA)
- Occupation: Textile artist
- Awards: Runner-up in the Arab-British Centre for Culture Award (2019); Member of the Order of the British Empire (MBE, 2022); Clore Fellowship; Finalist for the Niamh White-curated Dentons Art Prize
- Website: www.omeima-arts.com

Omeima Mudawi-Rowlings MBE (Arabic: أميمة مضوي, born April 1969) is a British-Sudanese deaf textile artist based in Brighton who is known for services to people with disabilities in the arts. Mudawi-Rowlings was born and lost her hearing at the age of four due to meningitis. Her family left Sudan when she was twelve as there were no deaf schools or support in Khartoum.

Mudawi-Rowlings graduated in Textile Design from the Surrey Institute of Art & Design, University College, in 1998. As a deaf student before the Disability Discrimination Act 1995, she faced challenges with limited support during lectures. She initially worked as a development officer at Friends for Young Deaf People, followed by roles assisting vulnerable deaf individuals and freelancing as a creative consultant. In 2003, she founded the Resonant Deaf Women Artist Network. Mudawi-Rowlings earned a Master of Arts in Arts Policy and Management from Birkbeck, University of London. Her career includes collaborations with organizations like Shape Arts, Artsadmin, and Artichoke. She founded her studio, Omeima Arts, at Cockpit Arts.

Her artwork, including dyes, screen printing, and Devoré technique, explores identity, communication, heritage, gender, and Arabic geometry, influenced by her Sudanese ethnicity. She received numerous awards and honours, including the Order of the British Empire (MBE) for her contributions to disability inclusion in the arts. Mudawi-Rowlings is a Clore Fellow and a finalist for the Dentons Art Prize.

== Life and career ==
=== Early life and education ===
Omeima Osman Khalid Mudawi was born in April 1969, in Sudan. She became deaf when she was four years old, after a bout of meningitis, and lived in Khartoum until she was twelve. Then her family decided to leave Sudan, as her brother became deaf too. This was to give them better education and life opportunities than in Khartoum — according to Mudawi-Rowlings — as there were no deaf schools or a deaf community, and teachers didn't understand her disability. However, her father remained in Sudan.

Mudawi-Rowlings graduated from the Surrey Institute of Art & Design, University College in 1998 with a Bachelor of Arts in Textile Design, which provided her with the opportunity to employ natural dyes. Mudawi-Rowlings was lured into the world of textiles by her love of colour, Arabic roots, and the chance to experiment with many procedures. Mudawi-Rowlings described her experience being a deaf student, before the Disability Discrimination Act 1995, as being tiring and frustrating as support was only being provided during main lectures.

=== Career ===
After her degree, Mudawi-Rowlings struggled to find a job and instead became a development officer at Friends for Young Deaf People. This was followed by numerous employment helping vulnerable and disadvantaged deaf individuals, and a freelancing creative consultancy. In 2003, she founded the Resonant Deaf Women Artist Network.

Mudawi-Rowlings completed a Master of Arts in Arts Policy and Management at Birkbeck, University of London. In 2015, she partnered with Shape Arts and SPACE when she was chosen for a residence in Qatar by the British Council to make work for the Museum of Islamic Art in Doha. Then, in 2017, she was given a research and development grant by Unlimited, a Shape Arts and Artsadmin-led initiative to boost the prominence of disabled artists. The following year, Mudawi-Rowlings received a commission from Artichoke to collaborate with local groups in Brighton to design a banner to commemorate the 100th anniversary of the Suffrage in the United Kingdom. The banner read, "Be Free, Be Visible, Be Counted." She then had her own studio space from Cockpit Arts, which allowed her to start her own studio, Omeima Arts.

Mudawi-Rowlings's dyes, screen printing, and Devoré technique work delves into topics of identity and transformation, communication, heritage, and gender. Her Sudanese ethnicity has a strong effect on her work, and she likes exploring inspirations from Arabic geometry. In addition to her practice, Mudawi-Rowlings works as a mentor and consultant trainer for emerging artists and young people, collaborating with prominent organisations, particularly those interested in inclusive practices

=== Personal life ===
Mudawi-Rowlings's father is Osman Mudawi, who was one of the founders of the National Congress Party that ruled Sudan for 30 years until the Sudanese Revolution in 2019. Mudawi-Rowlings comes from a big family of four sisters and five brothers. Her deaf brother, Ahmed Mudawi, is a BSL TV presenter, and Black and deaf awareness trainer.

== Awards and honours ==
Mudawi-Rowlings was the runner-up in the Arab-British CentAward for Culture in 2019. She became a member of the Order of the British Empire (MBE), awarded in the Queen's New Year's Honours list in 2022 for her "services to people with disabilities in the arts." Following Queen Elizabeth II's death, Mudawi-Rowlings received her medal from King Charles III during the February 2023 investiture.

Mudawi-Rowlings is a Clore Fellow, a fellowship that aims to develop leaders from a variety of cultural disciplines and industries. She was chosen as a finalist for the Niamh White-curated Dentons Art Prize.

== See also ==
- Ahmed Umar (artist)
- Kamala Ibrahim Ishaq
