= Aya Osman =

Sudanese-American professor

Aya Osman is a Sudanese-American Assistant Professor and Principal Investigator of the Osman Lab at University at Albany, State University of New York. Prior to starting her independent research laboratory, she was a postdoctoral fellow and later Assistant Professor at the Icahn School of Medicine in New York City, working in the Department of Neuroscience. She is also a fashion model.

== Early life ==
Osman was born in Saudi Arabia to Sudanese parents.

== Scientific career ==
Osman did her undergraduate training at Royal Holloway at the University of London. She earned her Ph.D. in neuropharmacology from the University of Surrey in the lab of Alexis Bailey, where she studied the effects of drinking milk on the gut microbiome and neural development of young mammals. After graduating, Osman went on to do postdoctoral work with Drew Kiraly at Icahn, where her work was supported under a Seaver Foundation Fellowship. During her postdoctoral appointment, Osman engaged in community outreach activities and science communications work around the COVID-19 pandemic, including an appearance on the podcast Black Girls Texting. Osman has also advocated for action to address mistrust of the medical system by Black people that has resulted from medical injustices.

== Modeling career ==
Osman began her career in fashion modeling at age 17, when she was recruited at a hair salon to model clothes for SIKA Designs. Osman achieved a level of success, but reduced her modeling workload towards the end of her graduate training and postdoctoral training.
