= Sudan–United Kingdom relations =

- Sudan: United Kingdom

Sudan and the United Kingdom maintain foreign relations. Sudan has an embassy in London, whilst the United Kingdom has an embassy in Khartoum. Most of the recent interactions between the two countries centre on the region of Darfur.

== History ==
Britain fought a war with Mahdist Sudan in the Mahdist War from 1881 until November 1899.

Between 1899 and the country's independence in 1956, Sudan (then known as "Anglo-Egyptian Sudan") was an Anglo-Egyptian condominium.

Although New Year's Day 1956 marked Sudan's independence, the British actually transferred power in 1954. Sudan set out almost immediately to broaden its relations with Arab and African states and then the Soviet Union, China, Eastern Europe, and Yugoslavia. Britain continued to provide considerable assistance, including military aid. As the civil war in the South grew in intensity, Sudan routinely blamed “evil colonial policies” as one of the causes. Relations with Britain decreased in importance as those with the Middle East and Africa increased. Sudan broke relations with Britain in 1965 over Britain's handling of the unilateral declaration of independence by Southern Rhodesia (now Zimbabwe). Khartoum restored ties a year later but then severed them again in 1967 because of the Six-Day War between Israel and neighboring states. Relations resumed again a year later. Sudan alleged that Britain was linked to a failed coup attempt in 1976. By the late 1970s, the United States had replaced Britain as the predominant Western influence in Khartoum, a situation that continued until the overthrow of the Sadiq al-Mahdi government in 1989. Britain remained important for historical reasons and retained strong trade links. Together with the United States and Norway, Britain strongly supported the IGAD peace process that resulted in an end to conflict between Khartoum and the SPLM/A. British prime minister Tony Blair visited Khartoum in October 2004 but took a more critical position on Sudan's policy in Darfur as the crisis dragged on. Of all EU members, the British position on Darfur was the closest to that of the United States.

Following the outbreak of War in Darfur in 2003, in June 2004, British international development secretary, Hilary Benn, ruled out international military intervention for Darfur. However, by the next month, it was reported that British Prime Minister Tony Blair was asking officials to draw up plans for possible military intervention in Sudan.

In January 2006, Prime Minister Blair told the British Parliament that the international community was failing the people of Darfur in Sudan and that it was vital that the underfunded African Union peacekeeping force in Darfur be brought to full strength.

In September 2006, Prime Minister Blair said he would propose an incentive package for Sudan as part of a new initiative to end the crisis in Darfur and get United Nations peacekeeping troops on the ground.

In supporting the United Nations Security Council resolution in 2007 to authorize the deployment of up to 26,000 peacekeepers to try to stop the violence in Darfur, British Prime Minister Gordon Brown in a speech before the General Assembly of the United Nations, urged strong support for peacekeeping in Darfur, calling the war "the greatest humanitarian disaster the world faces today". He also called for an end to aerial bombing of civilians, and for greater effort to support peace talks and reconstruction and said:

But we must be clear that if any party blocks progress and the killings continue, I and others will redouble our efforts to impose further sanctions. The message for Darfur is that it is a time for change.

In 2007, Sudanese President Omar Hassan al-Bashir accused Gordon Brown of deliberately undermining the Darfur peace talks and demanded a public apology after the prime minister's threat of new sanctions. Brown had said "Of course if parties do not come to the ceasefire there's a possibility we will impose further sanctions on the government."

Following the decision by the International Criminal Court (ICC) to issue an arrest warrant to the Sudanese President, Gordon Brown and British Foreign Secretary David Miliband urged the Sudanese Government to co-operate with the ICC.

In 2025, Foreign Secretary David Lammy faced criticism over the UK government's relations with the United Arab Emirates during the Sudanese civil war. Reports questioned the government's decision to invite the UAE to a London conference on Sudan despite allegations that it had supplied arms to the Rapid Support Forces (RSF). Separate media reports alleged that Foreign Office officials had sought to discourage criticism of the UAE at the United Nations over its alleged support for the RSF.

In December 2025, Foreign Secretary Yvette Cooper condemned the "horrific" atrocities in El Fasher, describing them as a "scar on the conscience of the world". Her statements followed the fall of El Fasher to the Rapid Support Forces (RSF) in late October 2025, which led to reports of widespread massacres. In late 2025, Cooper faced significant parliamentary and public pressure regarding allegations that the United Arab Emirates (UAE) is supplying arms to the Rapid Support Forces (RSF) in Sudan. She has avoided committing to an immediate arms embargo on the UAE, instead focusing on diplomatic pressure and humanitarian aid.

== Political relations ==
On 15 April 2025, the United Kingdom co-hosted a high-level diplomatic conference in London, alongside Germany and France, to address the ongoing civil war in Sudan, which began in April 2023. Marking the war’s second anniversary, the meeting at Lancaster House brought together representatives from nearly 20 countries and organisations. The UK aimed to galvanise international pressure for a ceasefire and ensure accountability for war crimes, amid accusations against both the Sudanese Armed Forces and the Rapid Support Forces (RSF). Notably, neither faction was invited. Tensions have risen with Sudan’s foreign minister Ali Youssef criticising the exclusion of Sudan and the inclusion of UAE, Chad, and Kenya, nations he labeled as "stakeholders in the war". The conference highlighted growing concerns over civilian suffering, humanitarian aid cuts, and external support for combatants, especially in light of Sudan’s accusations of UAE complicity in genocide in West Darfur. The UK initiative reflected a renewed push to prioritise Sudan diplomatically after years of relative neglect.

=== British Government aid ===
Britain is the second largest single country donor to Sudan contributing £175m of aid since 2003. In 2004, the British government committed 2 planes to help with the aid effort in Darfur.

In 2004, Britain confirmed that its aid package had been nearly doubled to £34.5 million, compared to European Union commitment of £7.8 million. In 2006, the British government committed US$76 million to aid efforts in Darfur to help the world's largest aid operation.

=== Non-government aid ===
British aid organisations British Red Cross, Save the Children and Oxfam were active in Darfur. In May 2004, Oxfam announced it was increasing its staff in Darfur as it was gravely concerned about the humanitarian crisis. Around the same time, the Sudanese Government made it easier for aid workers to obtain visas to work in Sudan. In 2007, Oxfam's operating budget for Sudan's western region was US$12 million.

==== Expulsion of aid staff in 2009 ====
In March 2009, Sudan expelled several major foreign aid agencies including Oxfam and Save the Children from Darfur in response to the extradition request of Omar al-Bashir to answer ICC charges. President al-Bashir accused foreign aid workers of being "spies" and "thieves". Penny Lawrence, Oxfam's international director, said of the ban "It will affect more than 600,000 Sudanese people whom we provide with vital humanitarian and development aid, including clean water and sanitation on a daily basis."

Gordon Brown said in response "The humanitarian agencies that are working in Sudan should be allowed to stay there and continue their work."

In April 2009, Oxfam and other aid agencies appealed their ban saying that "The expulsion is already affecting the lives of hundreds of thousands of the very poorest and most vulnerable Sudanese people". Oxfam have denied working for the ICC saying that "We don't have an agreement with the ICC, we are a humanitarian organisation and we are impartial," and "We don't have anything to do with the ICC and we don't have a position on its decision."

== Diplomatic missions ==
Embassy of Sudan in London
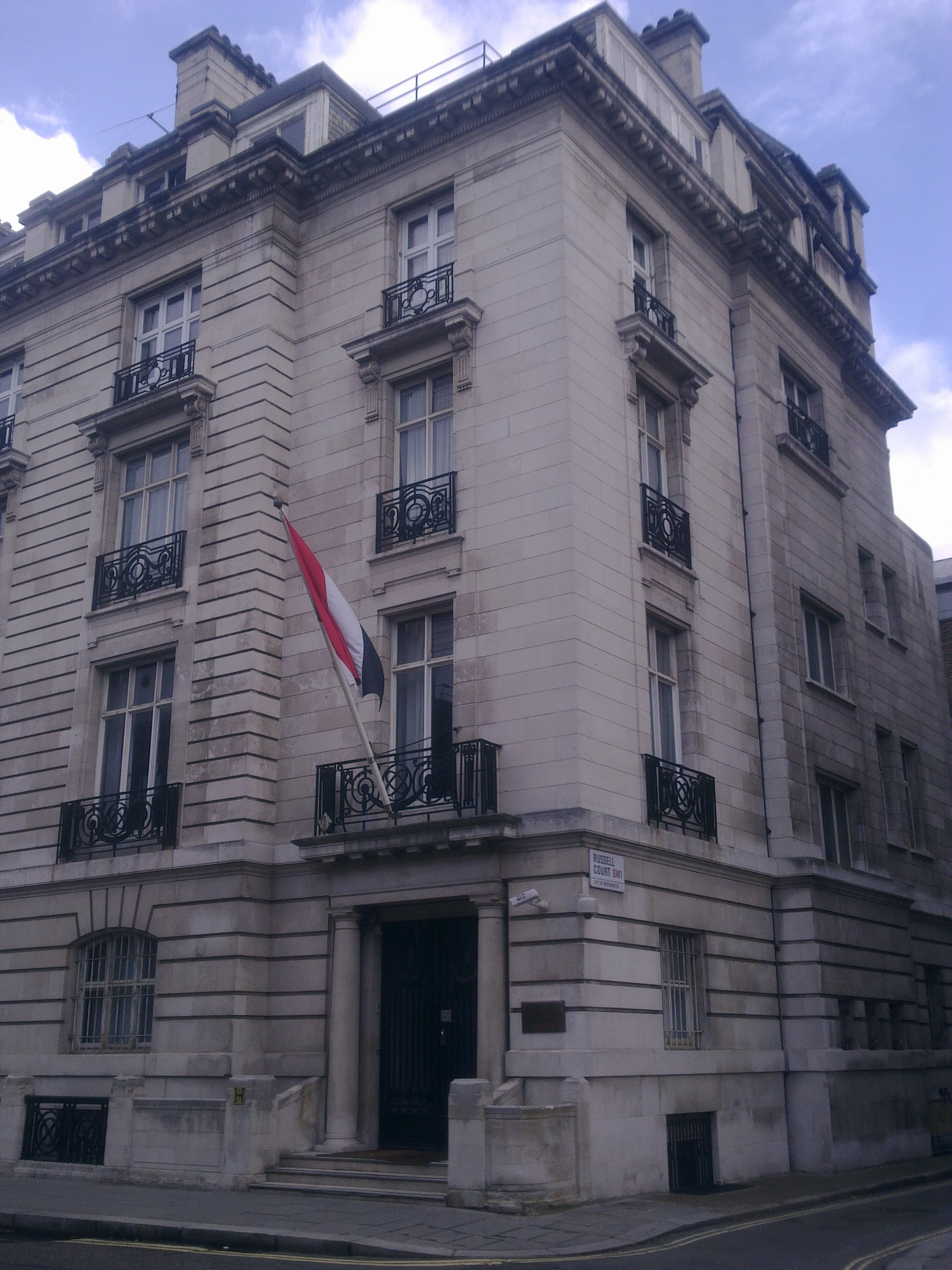
- Location: St James's, London
- Address: 3 Cleveland Row, London, SW1A 1DD
- Coordinates: 51°30′18″N 0°08′19″W
- Ambassador: Mohammed Abdalla Ali Eltom

The Embassy of Sudan in London is the diplomatic mission of Sudan in the United Kingdom, situated across from St James's Palace.

In 2013 the embassy was the site of a protest following a crackdown against protestors in Khartoum opposed to cuts in a fuel subsidy.

The landmark case Benkharbouche v Embassy of Sudan (2015) involved a Moroccan national who was employed as a cook at the Sudanese embassy in London.

In 2020, two assistants of the military attaché at the embassy applied for political asylum in Britain.

== See also ==
- Foreign relations of the United Kingdom
- Foreign relations of Sudan
- International response to the War in Darfur
