= Majak Daw =

Australian rules footballer (born 1991)

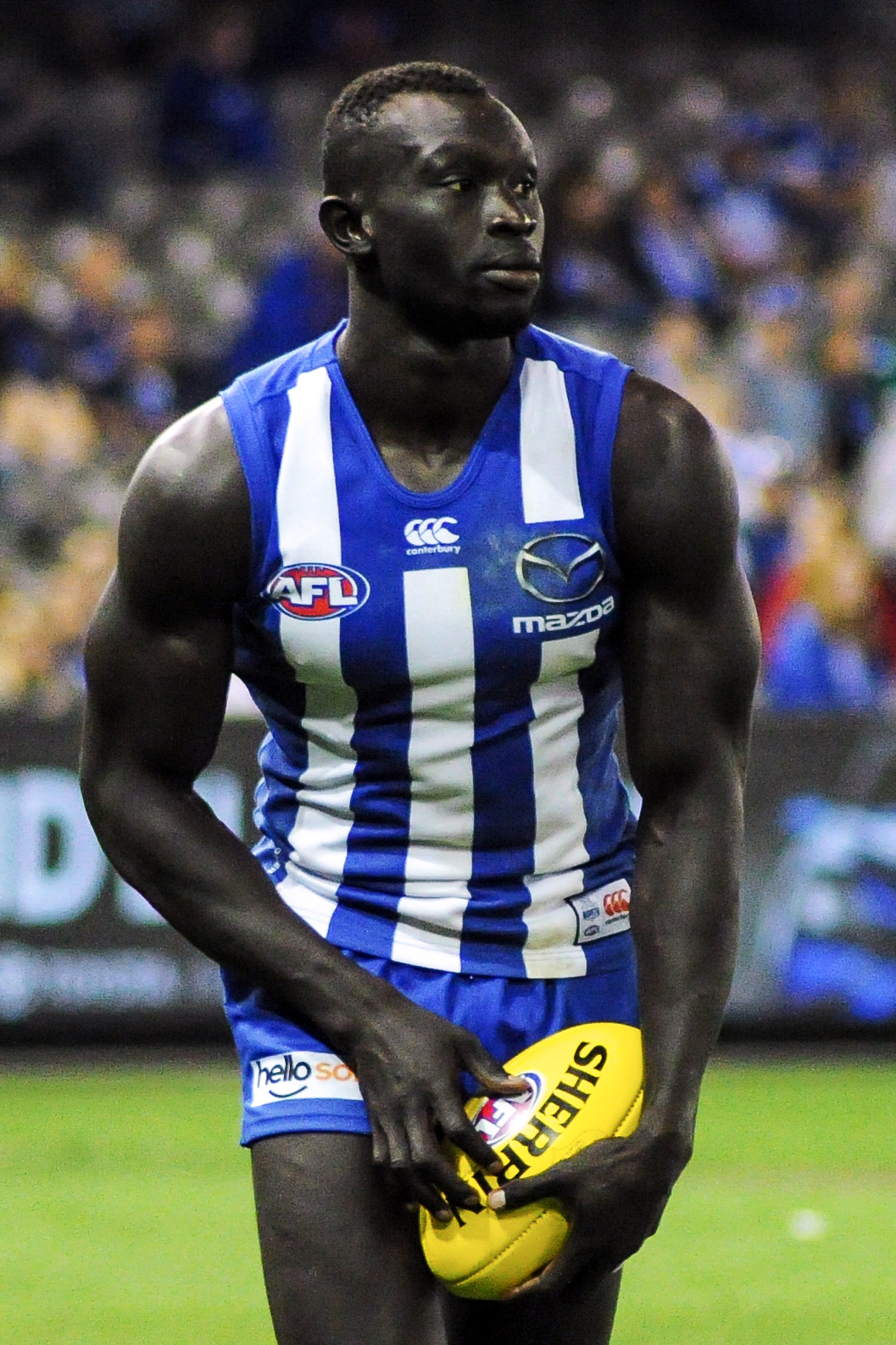
- Daw playing for North Melbourne in April 2018

Personal information
- Full name: Majak Daw
- Born: 11 March 1991 (age 35); Khartoum, Sudan
- Original team: Western Jets (TAC Cup)
- Height: 195 cm (6 ft 5 in)
- Weight: 101 kg (223 lb)
- Position: Forward / Ruckman / Defender

Playing career^{1}
Years	Club	Games (Goals)
2011–2020	North Melbourne	54 (43)
2021–2022	Melbourne	0 (0)
Total		54 (43)
- ^{1} Playing statistics correct to the end of round 23, 2022.

Career highlights
- Mark of the Year: 2016

Majak Daw (born 11 March 1991) is a former Australian rules footballer who played for the North Melbourne Football Club and the Melbourne Football Club in the Australian Football League (AFL).

Daw and his family in Australia are refugees from the civil wars in Sudan. Daw became the first Sudanese Australian to be drafted to an AFL club when he was contracted to North Melbourne in the 2009 AFL draft. Daw's drafting gained international attention; it was reported by the BBC, the Voice of America and Sudan Tribune. His AFL career is said to have inspired a new generation of African Australians to take up the sport and many others who followed his career path.

== Early life ==
Daw was born in Khartoum, Sudan, the third of his parents' eventual seven children. His family fled the Second Sudanese Civil War, living in Egypt for three years, then moved to Australia in 2003.

== TAC Cup years ==
Playing for the Western Jets Majak Daw was identified as a future key-position player by North Melbourne and the Western Bulldogs. Daw went to the 2009 Victorian Screening portion of the AFL pre-draft testing. He impressed with a 13.6 in the beep test and 3.03 seconds in a 20-metre sprint along with a standing jump of 70 centimetres. He was one of 11 young Australian rules footballers to be given 2010 Mike Fitzpatrick Scholarships awarded by the AFL Players Association and accepted the awards on behalf of the other players.

== AFL career ==
=== Draft to North Melbourne ===
Daw was picked up with the ninth pick in the 2010 rookie draft. His draft pick gained international media attention. His career at North Melbourne began with playing for VFL club Werribee, where he continued to develop his game. He made his first appearance for North Melbourne in a pre-season NAB cup match against the Western Bulldogs on 20 February 2011. In April 2011, playing for Werribee, Daw kicked an impressive running goal from beyond 50 m out, prompting calls for his inclusion to the senior team.

=== VFL racism incident ===
On 4 June 2011, Majak Daw was racially abused by a Port Melbourne Football Club supporter while he was playing for the Werribee Tigers in the VFL. Daw stated that it "made [him] feel really small". The man has since been banned from all VFL games until he completes an anti-racism workshop and formally apologises to Daw for the slur. The incident has led to renewed calls to stamp out racism in sport, with former Victorian Premier Ted Baillieu calling Daw a hero.

=== Suspension from North Melbourne senior team ===
Daw was suspended from North Melbourne Football Club in February 2012 and relegated to the Werribee Tigers for an indefinite period for lying to the club and coach Brad Scott about a "night on the town" during a period in which he was recovering from knee surgery.

=== AFL debut ===
In 2013, Daw had an excellent showing in the 2013 NAB Cup, which prompted calls for his inclusion in the Senior Side. When tall forward Robbie Tarrant went down with a thigh injury, Daw was brought in to replace him and make his debut in Round 4 against the Brisbane Lions. In the first minute of the game, Daw marked the ball inside 50, and kicked his first AFL goal with his first AFL kick. However, his debut ended on a sour note when he collided with teammate Ben Cunnington and suffered a concussion before quarter time, and he took no further part in the game. North went on to win the game by 63 points.

Daw held his spot and played the next week, scoring no goals but three behinds against Hawthorn. In Round 7 against the Western Bulldogs, Majak had a breakout performance in just his fourth career game, kicking a game-high 6 goals in North's 54-point win. After the match, North Melbourne coach Brad Scott said of Majak: "'Maj' is a good example of what you can do with really hard work. Hard work trumps talent any day of the week."

=== 2015–2022 ===
Daw was delisted in October 2015; however, he was re-drafted in the 2016 rookie draft.

In 2015, Daw won the AFL Grand Final Sprint.

In 2016, Majak Daw won Mark of the Year after taking a specky against Collingwood. Majak played the most games in a season in his career at that point, with nine, in addition to playing in his first final, which was in an elimination final against Adelaide, and kicking four goals despite North Melbourne losing 141–79.

In 2017, after having a season full of injuries and only managing to play seven games in total, at the end of the 2017 AFL season Daw eyed more versatility as an AFL player.

In the 2018 off-season, Daw changed his position from a forward to a defender. Daw sought this change because he thought it was his last chance at thriving in the AFL. Majak played his first game as a defender against Carlton in the AFLX series. Later on in Round 3 against Melbourne, Daw officially played his first game as a defender. For the season, Daw thrived in his new position and reached career highs in games played.

Daw was delisted by North Melbourne at the end of the 2020 AFL season after a mass delisting by North Melbourne which saw 11 players cut from the team's list.

Daw was recruited to the Melbourne Football Club in 2021, playing at VFL-level all that season.

Daw struggled with injury during his time at Melbourne and did not play a senior game for them before announcing his retirement in June 2022.

== Statistics ==
Statistics are correct to the end of round 12, 2022

Legend
G	Goals	K	Kicks	D	Disposals	T	Tackles
B	Behinds	H	Handballs	M	Marks	H/O	Hit-outs

Season	Team	No.	Games	Totals								Averages (per game)							
Season	Team	No.	Games	G	B	K	H	D	M	T	H/O	G	B	K	H	D	M	T	H/O
2011	North Melbourne	38	0	–	–	–	–	–	–	–	–	–	–	–	–	–	–	–	–
2012	North Melbourne	38	0	–	–	–	–	–	–	–	–	–	–	–	–	–	–	–	–
2013	North Melbourne	38	6	9	8	29	14	43	16	11	28	1.5	1.3	4.8	2.3	7.2	2.7	1.8	4.7
2014	North Melbourne	38	8	6	10	35	24	59	20	27	54	0.8	1.3	4.4	3.0	7.4	2.5	3.4	6.8
2015	North Melbourne	38	2	2	0	8	3	11	4	10	29	1.0	0.0	4.0	1.5	5.5	2.0	5.0	14.5
2016	North Melbourne	38	9	9	12	52	34	86	34	28	72	1.0	1.3	5.8	3.8	9.6	3.8	3.1	8.0
2017	North Melbourne	38	7	4	3	28	20	48	17	23	112	0.6	0.4	4.0	2.9	6.9	2.4	3.3	16.0
2018	North Melbourne	1	18	10	4	135	81	216	95	44	87	0.6	0.2	7.5	4.5	12.0	5.3	2.4	4.8
2019	North Melbourne	1	0	–	–	–	–	–	–	–	–	–	–	–	–	–	–	–	–
2020 (Note: The 2020 season was played with 17 home-and-away matches per team (down from 22) and 16-minute quarters with time on (down from 20-minute quarters with time on) due to the impact of the COVID-19 pandemic.)	North Melbourne	1	4	3	1	17	18	35	9	8	23	0.8	0.3	4.3	4.5	8.8	2.3	2.0	5.8
2021	Melbourne	28	0	–	–	–	–	–	–	–	–	–	–	–	–	–	–	–	–
2022	Melbourne	28	0	–	–	–	–	–	–	–	–	–	–	–	–	–	–	–	–
Career			54	43	38	304	194	498	195	151	405	0.8	0.7	5.6	3.6	9.2	3.6	2.8	7.5

== Personal life ==
On 1 July 2014, Daw was charged with three counts of rape relating to an alleged sexual assault incident in Altona North in 2007. He had been previously arrested and interviewed over the allegations in May 2014. Daw denied the allegations, while North Melbourne stated that he would remain available for selection. On 3 December 2015, Daw was found not guilty on all counts.

On 18 December 2018, Daw abandoned his vehicle on the Bolte Bridge and jumped into the Yarra River 25 metres (82 ft) below. Motorists on the bridge raised the alarm around 11 pm and he was recovered from the river by police and paramedics. He suffered broken hips and pelvis. In July 2019, Daw made a return for the North Melbourne VFL affiliate against Sandringham, the VFL affiliate of St Kilda. Daw made his AFL return on 1 August 2020 in a win against Adelaide, kicking one goal.
