= Sudanese Australians =

Sudanese migrants to Australia

- (Australia) (Sudan)

Total population
- 16,609 (born in Sudan, 2021)

Regions with significant populations
- Victoria: 6,085
- New South Wales: 5,629
- Western Australia: 2,722
- Queensland: 2,582

Languages
- Sudanese Arabic · Australian English

Religion
- Islam, Christianity

Sudanese Australians (Arabic: أستراليون سودانيون) are people of Sudanese origin or descent living in Australia. The largest population of Sudanese Australians reside in Victoria (6,085).

== Brief history ==
=== Early migration ===
Before the First Sudanese Civil War, most Sudanese migrants arrived in Australia to pursue educational opportunities in both undergraduate and post graduate institutions across Australia. The large number of Sudanese migrant settled in the states like Victoria and New South Wales.

=== After the first civil war ===
A larger influx of Sudanese emigrated to Australia as a result of political and economic problems. The most noticeable exodus occurred among professional and middle class Sudanese who along with their children took advantage of education and employment opportunities in Australia to emigrate.

=== After the second civil war ===
Number of permanent settlers arriving in Australia from Sudan since 1991 (monthly)

Since 1983, fighting between Sudan's government and the rebels in the south has killed about two million people. The fighting in Sudan has interfered with the production and distribution of food and caused widespread hunger. Many civilians in southern Sudan had fled their region because of this crisis. Some Sudanese Australians returned to their ancestral homeland when the conflict officially ended in 2005. Following South Sudan becoming an independent nation in 2011, earlier waves of Sudanese Australians were recognized as a separate community and became South Sudanese Australians.

Sudanese Australians suffer from racist attitudes on the part of white Australians, including members of the police force, politicians and the media, and on occasions this has led to violence and even murder. In 2007 Liep Gony, a 17-year-old Sudanese Australian, was killed in a random attack by two white men, one of whom had expressed the desire to kill a Sudanese man. Initial press reports claimed this murder to be related to Sudanese gang crime, and in the subsequent political storm, the Liberal National government more than halved the number of visas available to Sudanese people.

Sudanese Australians were the object of an intense moral panic around supposed gang crime in Victoria in the period of 2016 to 2018, where the press and coalition politicians employed racialised criminalising language and exaggerated and distorted reporting of incidents involving, or allegedly involving, Sudanese Australians. In Victoria, Australia, people born in Sudan were overrepresented in crime statistics in 2017–2018, accounting for 1.1% of unique alleged offenders while making up about 0.14% of the state population. Professor Wood of Melbourne University cautioned that this disparity should not be interpreted in isolation, as the Sudanese-born population in Victoria was unusually young. Because offending is concentrated among younger age groups, especially those aged 18 to 25, the age profile of the community was described as an important factor helping to explain its overrepresentation.

== Census data ==
The 2011 census recorded 19,369 people born in Sudan. Of these, the largest number were living in the state of Victoria, (6,085), followed by New South Wales (5,629), Western Australia (2,722) and then Queensland (2,582). 17,186 people indicated that they were of full or partial Sudanese ancestry.

The Department of Immigration and Citizenship notes that South Sudan became independent from the Republic of Sudan on 9 July 2011, shortly before the census, and that "country of birth figures as completed by individuals at the time of the 2011 Census may not fully reflect this change". The census, held in August, included both Sudan and South Sudan amongst the country of birth and ancestry options.

According to the 2006 census, there were 19,049 Sudanese-born Australian residents, many of whom had arrived very recently: 77% since 2000. Between 1996 and 2005, the largest increase in Australian people born overseas were Sudanese, at 28% per year. Other fast-growing overseas-born groups were people from Afghanistan (12% average increase per year) and Iraq (10%). Australian residents from sub-Saharan Africa increased on average by 6% per year over this period.

In the 2006 Census 17,848 residents in Australia reported having Sudanese ancestry. People of Sudanese descent now live in almost every capital city in Australia, particularly Melbourne (5,911), Sydney (5,335) and Perth (1,993)

== Notable Sudanese Australians ==
- Yassmin Abdel-Magied - Engineer, author, television presenter and activist

Further examples are in Category:Australian people of Sudanese descent.

== See also ==
- African Australians
- Sudanese Americans
- Sudanese British
