= Gabriel Horenczyk =

Israeli psychologist

- גבריאל הורנצ'יק
- Occupation: Researcher

Academic work
- Discipline: Psychology
- Sub-discipline: Social psychology
- Institutions: Hebrew University of Jerusalem

Gabriel Horenczyk (Hebrew: גבריאל הורנצ'יק) is a social psychologist who has conducted various studies on acculturation and cultural identity. He is currently employed at the Hebrew University of Jerusalem in Israel.

== Main publications ==
- Horenczyk (1997). Immigrants' perceptions of host attitudes and their reconstruction of cultural groups. Applied Psychology, 46(1), 34–38.
- Phinney, Horenczyk, Liebkind & Vedder (2000). Ethnic identity, immigration, and well-being: An interactional perspective. Journal of Social Issues, 57(3), 493–510.
- Roccas, Horenczyk & Schwartz (2000). Acculturation discrepancies and well-being: the moderating role of conformity. European Journal of Social Psychology, 30(3), 323–334.
